= Baton Rouge Area Foundation =

- Founded: 1964
- Founder: The Foundation was founded in June 1964 by eleven civic leaders who wanted to use the Foundation as a tool for community development.
- Type: Nonprofit
- Purpose: Mission Statement: Connecting donors with the causes they care most about.
- Headquarters: Baton Rouge, Louisiana, USA
- Location: Baton Rouge, LA
- Region served: South Louisiana
- Members: ~450
- Key people: Chris Meyer, president and CEO
- Employees: ~28
- Website: https://www.braf.org

The Baton Rouge Area Foundation (BRAF) is a nonprofit community foundation established in 1964 by a group of civic leaders in Baton Rouge, Louisiana. Its mission is to enhance the quality of life in Louisiana's capital region by uniting human and financial resources to address community challenges and opportunities. It is registered with the IRS as a 501(c)(3) tax-deductible nonprofit organization. BRAF serves a service area encompassing over 1.5 million residents across multiple parishes in South Louisiana.

== Mission ==
The Baton Rouge Area Foundation unites human and financial resources to enhance the quality of life in South Louisiana.

To achieve the mission, BRAF operates through three primary avenues:

1. Fostering a strong philanthropic environment: Assisting individuals and organizations in establishing charitable funds to support various causes.
2. Empowering Nonprofits: Providing strategic consulting, capacity-building programs, and competitive grants to strengthen local nonprofits.
3. Catalyzing change and positive opportunity: Engaging with civic leaders to develop and implement initiatives that address regional challenges.

== History ==
Established in 1964 by a group of 12 local civic leaders, BRAF was initially formed to raise funds and acquire land for the Gulf South Research Institute (GSRI) to establish offices in Baton Rouge.

John Davies was BRAF's first full-time President and Chief Executive Officer, and led the foundation for 33 years until his retirement. Under his leadership, the Foundation grew from $5 million assets to over $700 million. The Foundation is currently led by Chris Meyer, former CEO of New Schools for Baton Rouge.

The Foundation's property real-estate arm, Commercial Properties Realty Trust, built and owns several properties in downtown Baton Rouge, including the IBM Building. BRAF has relocated from the IBM Building into the basement of the newly renovated Watermark Centre.

In 2022, BRAF launched the Opportunity Agenda to strategically address systemic inequities and expand access to opportunity across the Baton Rouge region. Developed through extensive community engagement—including input from over 300 residents—the agenda identifies six key focus areas: Economic Prosperity, Excellent Education, Healthy Families, Quality of Life, Safer Neighborhoods, Regional Resilience. These areas serve as the foundation for BRAF’s philanthropic and civic initiatives, guiding investments and partnerships that aim to create lasting, equitable impact.

As of 2023, BRAF reported total assets of approximately $748 million and net assets of $311 million. In the fiscal year ending December 2023, the foundation's revenue was $54.6 million, with expenses totaling $48.6 million. The majority of its revenue was derived from contributions and investment income.

Since its inception, BRAF has granted over $650 million to various causes, reflecting its ongoing commitment to fostering positive change in South Louisiana.

== Civic Leadership Initiatives and Notable Projects ==
The Baton Rouge Area Foundation (BRAF) leads and supports a variety of civic leadership projects aimed at enhancing the quality of life in the Baton Rouge region. These initiatives focus on areas such as urban revitalization, environmental sustainability, public health, education, and community safety.

=== LSU Lakes Revitalization ===
The LSU Lakes Revitalization, also known as the University Lakes Project, is an ongoing environmental restoration and infrastructure enhancement initiative aimed at revitalizing the six-lake system surrounding Louisiana State University (LSU) in Baton Rouge, Louisiana. The project seeks to improve water quality, enhance recreational amenities, and reduce flood risks in the surrounding neighborhoods. BRAF underwrote the master plan to preserve and beautify the lakes.

The LSU Lakes system was originally a cypress swamp, which was drained and converted into parkland during the 1930s by the Works Progress Administration (WPA) as part of a federal relief effort during the Great Depression. The transformation created a series of six interconnected lakes—City Park Lake, University Lake, College Lake, Campus Lake, Crest Lake, and Erie Lake—surrounded by LSU's campus and adjacent neighborhoods. Over time, sedimentation and inadequate water depth led to declining water quality and ecological health, prompting the need for restoration.

The revitalization project commenced in 2019 with the formation of a coalition comprising LSU, the State of Louisiana, the City of Baton Rouge, BREC, and the Baton Rouge Area Foundation. The LSU Real Estate and Facilities Foundation (LSU REFF) was designated to oversee the project, with Sasaki Associates leading the master planning efforts.

The restoration is being implemented in multiple phases:

- Phase 1 (2020–2024): Focused on dredging City Park Lake and Lake Erie to remove sediment and increase water depth, thereby improving water quality and reducing flood risks.
- Phase 2A (2024–2025): Involves dredging College Lake and the northern portion of University Lake, along with shoreline enhancements and the extension of the LSU Bird Sanctuary.
- Phase 2B (2025–2026): Plans to dredge the southern half of University Lake and implement infrastructure improvements, including the construction of a new bridge on May Street to connect City Park Lake and University Lake.

The revitalization project is supported through a combination of public and private funding sources. As of 2025, approximately $75 million has been committed to the initiative, with contributions from state and local governments, LSU, and philanthropic organizations.

Upon completion, the LSU Lakes Revitalization is expected to restore the ecological health of the lakes, enhance recreational opportunities for the Baton Rouge community, and serve as a model for urban waterway restoration projects nationwide.

=== Plan Baton Rouge ===
Plan Baton Rouge is a comprehensive urban revitalization initiative that began in 1998, aiming to transform downtown Baton Rouge into a vibrant, pedestrian-friendly, and economically dynamic urban center. The plan has undergone multiple phases, each building upon the successes and lessons of its predecessors.

==== Origins and Plan Baton Rouge I (1998) ====
The concept for Plan Baton Rouge emerged from a week-long charrette in July 1998, facilitated by the Baton Rouge Area Foundation (BRAF). This collaborative effort involved town planners, architects, developers, property owners, civic organizations, community groups, and residents. The charrette was inspired by the principles of New Urbanism and sought to address the challenges facing downtown Baton Rouge, including underutilized spaces, lack of pedestrian infrastructure, and limited mixed-use development.

A key influence on the planning process was Stefanos Polyzoides, a founding member of the Congress for the New Urbanism, whose lectures on urban design principles inspired local stakeholders to pursue a vision of a more livable and sustainable downtown.

==== Plan Baton Rouge II (2009) ====
Building upon the foundation laid by the original plan, Plan Baton Rouge II was launched in 2009 to further enhance the downtown area. This phase focused on promoting initiatives designed to increase downtown's livability, vibrancy, and entertainment options. Key priorities included promoting a central green space, developing Third Street as a vibrant entertainment corridor, ensuring downtown cleanliness and safety, enhancing the Mississippi Riverfront, and establishing integrated public parking policies.

The implementation of Plan Baton Rouge II led to significant investments in the downtown area, including the creation of the Main Street Market, the renovation of the historic Heidelberg Hotel into the Hilton Baton Rouge Capitol Center, and the development of the Shaw Center for the Arts. These projects have contributed to the revitalization of downtown Baton Rouge, attracting both residents and visitors.

==== Plan Baton Rouge III (2025–2026) ====
In early 2025, the Baton Rouge Area Foundation selected the international planning and design firm Sasaki to lead the development of Plan Baton Rouge III. This new phase aims to build upon the successes of the previous plans and address emerging challenges and opportunities in downtown Baton Rouge. The planning process emphasizes community engagement and collaboration to ensure that the vision for downtown reflects the needs and aspirations of its residents and stakeholders.

The focus areas for Plan Baton Rouge III include enhancing urban development and community engagement, with an emphasis on placemaking, developing new housing units, enhancing the riverfront, improving infrastructure and connectivity, attracting new businesses, and highlighting downtown Baton Rouge's unique arts and cultural potential.

=== Baton Rouge City Stats ===
Baton Rouge City Stats is a project launched by the foundation in 2008 uses Economic indicators to measure the quality of life in East Baton Rouge, to help created a shared vision among residents. The project uses a total of 50 quality-of-life indicators that measure categories such as economy, education, public safety, and health.

=== Ernest J. Gaines Award for Literary Excellence ===
The Ernest J. Gaines Award for Literary Excellence is an annual literary award that recognizes an emerging African-American author of fiction. The book award honors the accomplishments of Gaines, a Louisiana native and resident. Past winners include Jacinda Townsend, Nathan Harris, Gabriel Bump, Bryan Washington, Jamel Brinkley, Ladee Hubbard, Crystal Wilkinson, T. Geronimo Johnson, Mitchell S. Jackson, Attica Locke, Stephanie Powell Watts, Dinaw Mengestu, Victor LaValle, Jeffery Renard Allen, Ravi Howard, and Olympia Vernon. The winners receive a $15,000 cash prize.

=== Opportunity Data Project ===
In partnership with Common Good Labs, BRAF launched this initiative to use data science for understanding community needs. The project focuses on areas such as education, public safety, and economic mobility, providing insights to guide civic initiatives.

=== Baton Rouge Health District ===
The concept for the Health District was initiated by the Baton Rouge Area Foundation (BRAF) in 2011, following the identification of the South Baton Rouge medical corridor as a key area for development in the East Baton Rouge Parish's comprehensive plan, FuturEBR. In 2015, BRAF released a master plan outlining strategies to enhance infrastructure, promote mixed-use development, and foster collaboration among healthcare providers and institutions.

The Baton Rouge Health District is a transformative initiative aimed at establishing Baton Rouge as a leading hub for healthcare, innovation, and wellness. Spanning over 1,000 acres, the district integrates medical institutions, research centers, educational facilities, and residential areas to create a cohesive community focused on health and quality of life.

== Funds ==
Establishing a fund with the foundation allow donors to connect their philanthropic giving to the issues and nonprofits that interest them most. Different types of funds that can be established include Donor Advised Funds, Field of Interest Funds, Unrestricted Funds, Designated Funds, Organizational Funds, and Scholarship Funds.

== Affiliates ==
BRAF supports several affiliated community foundations, including the Northshore Community Foundation and the Community Foundation of Southwest Louisiana, which operate independently but share BRAF's mission to enhance regional quality of life.
