= Literary award =

Award for authors and literary associations

A literary award or literary prize is an award presented in recognition of a particularly lauded literary piece or body of work. It is normally presented to an author.

== Organizations ==
Most literary awards come with a corresponding award ceremony. Many awards are structured with one organization (usually a non-profit organization) as the presenter and public face of the award, and another organization as the financial sponsor or backer, who pays the prize remuneration and the cost of the ceremony and public relations, typically a corporate sponsor who may sometimes attach their name to the award (such as the Orange Prize).

== Types of awards ==
There are awards for various writing formats including poetry and novels. Many awards are also dedicated to a certain genre of fiction or non-fiction writing (such as science fiction or politics). There are also awards dedicated to works in individual languages, such as the Miguel de Cervantes Prize (Spanish); the Camões Prize (Portuguese); the Booker Prize, The Writers' Prize, the Pulitzer Prize and the Hugo Award (English).

Other international literary prizes include the Nobel Prize in Literature, the Franz Kafka Prize, and the Jerusalem Prize. The International Dublin Literary Award is given to writers, as well as to the translator(s) if the book chosen was written in a language other than English. The Astrid Lindgren Memorial Award is given annually to a person or organisation for their outstanding contribution to children's and young adult literature.

Spoof awards include: The Literary Review Bad Sex in Fiction Award, the Bookseller/Diagram Prize for Oddest Title of the Year, and the Bulwer-Lytton Fiction and Lyttle Lytton Contests, given to deliberately bad grammar

There are also literary awards targeted specifically to encourage the writing from African American origin and authors of African descent. Two of these awards are Ernest J. Gaines Award for Literary Excellence, which was established in 2007 by the Baton Rouge Area Foundation, and Hurston/Wright Legacy Award, which is a given by the National Community of Black Writers.

Some literary awards specifically recognize LGBTQ literature, whether for works by LGBTQ authors or with LGBTQ themes or characters. Longstanding LGBTQ literary awards include Lambda Literary Awards, Publishing Triangle's awards, Stonewall Book Awards, and Gaylactic Spectrum Awards.

== Criticism ==
Australian author Richard Flanagan wrote a critique of literary awards, saying "National prizes are often a barometer of bourgeois bad taste." He says juries can be influenced by vendettas, paybacks and payoffs, "most judges are fair-minded people. But hate, conceit and jealousy are no less human attributes than wisdom, judgment and knowledge." Book prizes will sometimes compete with one another, and these goals do not always coincide with anointing the best winner. Sometimes juries can not decide between two contentious books so they will compromise with a third inoffensive bland book. He says there are now so many awards and prizes it has diluted the prestige of being a prize-winning book. Flanagan clarifies he is not against literary awards, but believes they should not be taken too seriously as a form of support for literary culture.

== See also ==
- List of literary awards
- List of poetry awards
- List of the world's richest literary prizes
- Literary festival
- Vanity award
