= BRAF =

BRAF may refer to:

- Baton Rouge Area Foundation
- BRAF (gene)
