= The Cutting Season =

2012 novel by Attica Locke

- Author: Attica Locke
- Genre: Crime fiction
- Published: 2012

The Cutting Season is a 2012 mystery thriller novel by Attica Locke.

== Plot summary ==
Caren Gray is manager of Belle Vie, a historic antebellum plantation in Baton Rouge, Louisiana used as an event venue. After a dead woman is found on the estate grounds, the plantation is torn apart by an investigation.

== Reception ==
The novel received positive reviews from critics. Val McDermid, in The Guardian, described it as "a novel rich in atmosphere, strong in story, but at its heart The Cutting Season hinges on human complexity. The tangled rope of some kind of history has a stranglehold on everyone at the heart of this book". Kirkus Reviews wrote that it was "written with fluidity and elegance, evoking the uniqueness of her setting and the nuances in the relationships of her characters, complicated by race, class and history." It won the 2013 Ernest J. Gaines Award for Literary Excellence.
