= Song of the Shank =

2014 novel by Jeffery Renard Allen

- Author: Jeffery Renard Allen
- Language: English
- Publication date: June 17, 2014
- Media type: Paperback
- ISBN: 978-1-55597-680-4

Song of the Shank is a novel by Jeffery Renard Allen, published by Graywolf Press in 2014. It is the author's second novel. His first novel, Rails Under My Back, was published by Farrar, Straus, and Giroux fourteen years earlier in 2000.

The publisher described the novel as follows: At the heart of this remarkable novel is Thomas Greene Wiggins, a nineteenth-century slave and improbable musical genius who performed under the name Blind Tom.

In 1866, Tom and his guardian, Eliza Bethune, struggle to readjust to their fashionable apartment in the City in the aftermath of riots that had driven them away a few years before. But soon a stranger arrives from the mysterious island of Edgemere—inhabited solely by African settlers and black refugees from the war and riots—who intends to reunite Tom with his now-liberated mother. As the novel ranges from Tom's boyhood to the heights of his performing career, the inscrutable savant is buffeted by opportunistic teachers and crooked managers, crackpot healers, and militant prophets.

In his symphonic novel, Jeffery Renard Allen blends history and fantastical invention to bring to life a radical cipher, a man who profoundly changes all who encounter him. At the heart of this remarkable novel is Thomas Greene Wiggins, a nineteenth-century slave, and improbable musical genius who performed under the name Blind Tom. In 1866, Tom and his guardian, Eliza Bethune, struggle to readjust to their fashionable apartment in the City in the aftermath of riots that had driven them away a few years before. But soon a stranger arrives from the mysterious island of Edgemere—inhabited solely by African settlers and black refugees from the war and riots—who intends to reunite Tom with his now-liberated mother.

As the novel ranges from Tom's boyhood to the heights of his performing career, the inscrutable savant is buffeted by opportunistic teachers and crooked managers, crackpot healers, and militant prophets. In his symphonic novel, Jeffery Renard Allen blends history and fantastical invention to bring to life a radical cipher, a man who profoundly changes all who encounter him.'

== Origins of the novel ==
In an essay Allen wrote about the novel and in interviews, he discusses how he began writing The Song of the Shank when he learned of Thomas Wiggins in Oliver Sacks' book An Anthropologist on Mars. Allen started researching Wiggins and working on the novel while he was a fellow at The Dorothy L. and Lewis B. Cullman Center for Scholars and Writers at the New York Public Library. The fellowship began on September 10, 2001, one day before the terrorist attacks on the World Trade Center and the Pentagon.

Allen discusses the terrorist attacks and how they are figured into the novel. He also discusses how his travels on the African continent shaped his creation of a fictional island called Edgemere, a place that is central to the novel's setting and construction of place.

As for music, Allen notes that he avoided listening to any recordings of Blind Tom's compositions because he wanted to use his imagination to create his image of what Tom's music might have sounded like to a listener of Tom's area. On the novel's acknowledgment page, Allen mentions some of the wide-ranging musical influences that shaped his writing, including the Malian singer Oumou Sangaré and the rock band Tool. About the latter, Allen states in an interview that he was inspired by their unusual songs about physical and spiritual transformations of mind and body.

Allen received a support grant from Creative Capital that helped him during many of the years that it took him to write the novel.

== Synopsis ==
Song of the Shank is a novel loosely based on the life of Thomas Greene Wiggins, a nineteenth-century African-American pianist, composer, and performer, who played under the stage name Blind Tom. Born a slave in Columbus, Georgia, in 1849, Tom began giving concert recitals at the age of six and went on to become for several decades one of the most famous Americans of his time. Not only did he play to full houses across the US, the British Isles, and Europe, but he was also the first African American to perform at the White House. However, he has for the most part disappeared from history, in part because musicologists have come to view him as an autistic savant who lacked true creative ability.

Totaling more than 600 pages, the novel has nine sections in all, each told in third or first person from the point of view of varying central characters, which total seven in all. The present action of the novel covers a period of less than four years, from 1866 until 1869, with flashbacks to the earlier years of Tom's life. When the novel opens, Tom is living in isolation in a Manhattan apartment with his sole guardian, Eliza Bethune, the widow of his former manager who wants to rid herself of Tom. The novel's subsequent sections examine Tom's powerful impact on those who try to return him to fame or who simply want to understand him, including his mother after a decade of separation.

In the same way that the novel offers an alternative history of Tom, it also offers an altered history of New York City and America as a whole during the years immediately before the Civil War, the war itself, and the years that followed. These fictive spaces of place and time allow for an imaginative exploration of many subjects, including family, bondage and freedom, religion, and the creative impulse.

== Critical reception ==
The novel was well received by critics. It was the front-page review for the June 22, 2014, Sunday edition of the New York Times Book Review magazine, where it was reviewed by novelist Mitchell S. Jackson. The Chicago Tribune gave the novel considerable attention, both reviewing the novel and publishing an excerpt of the book in the newspaper. Essence magazine listed it as one of five recommend books for summer reading.

Gene Seymour wrote a full-page review of the novel for Bookforum, where he described it as "...an eerie fever dream of an historical novel". He also wrote, "The imaginative artist, especially one such as Allen, who carries the resources of the poet and the psychic in his trick bag.…"

Booklist gave the novel a starred review where the reviewer wrote: "In the extraordinarily talented hands of Allen, Tom is a mysterious and compelling figure, a blind black boy at a time when his perceived infirmities, including his race, should make him insignificant.... [A] tour de force.... A brilliant book, with echoes of Ralph Ellison and William Faulkner."

Kirkus Reviews also gave the novel a starred review, with the reviewer writing: "Allen's psychological insight and evocative language vividly bring to life all the black and white people in Tom's life who, in seeking to understand or exploit Tom's unholy gifts, are both transformed and transfixed by his inscrutable, resolutely self-contained personality. If there's any justice, Allen's visionary work, as startlingly inventive as one of his subject's performances, should propel him to the front rank of American novelists."

In a mixed review that appeared in Publishers Weekly, the reviewer wrote: "Both the conception and the underlying history behind this story will leave readers with a profound understanding of the inhumanity of slavery and 19th century racial attitudes. . . . [An] admirable book that invites an important excavation of the past."

The cover of the novel featured a blurb by Junot Díaz, who writes: "The prodigiously talented Jeffery Renard Allen is without question one of our most important writers." The novel received additional blurbs on the book and printed and online publicity from a number of distinguished writers, including John Edgar Wideman, Ishmael Reed, and René Steinke. Here are the blurbs as listed on the first edition of the book and the author's and publishers websites:

"One of the miracle books. Also a gift for those of us who love reading and writing---a gift for those not born yet who will learn much about writing and reading, about themselves from Blind Tom". - John Edgar Wideman

"Song of the Shank, for all of its invention, feels like a resurrection of a true past. Jeffery Renard Allen so fully inhabits this imagined history, and so convincingly renders the charisma and mystery of Blind Tom, the story seems as alive and immediate as this very present moment. With his electric and searing prose, with his uncanny insight, Allen has written a spell-binding, masterful novel". - René Steinke, author of Friendswood

"Allen’s novel is an amazing, imagining of another time, place, world". - Reginald Gibbons

"Talent and brilliance are not enough. Writing a novel like this is the equivalent of building a three-story building. Single handedly. Jeffery Renard Allen scores highly with this novel about the life of the nineteenth century savant, BlindTom." - Ishmael Reed
