= Nicholas Montemarano =

American writer

Nicholas Montemarano (born 1970) is an American writer originally from Queens, New York. He is the author of three novels, The Senator's Children, The Book of Why, and A Fine Place, and the short story collection If the Sky Falls. His fiction has been published widely in magazines such as Esquire, Zoetrope: All-Story, Tin House, DoubleTake, The Gettysburg Review, The Antioch Review, The Southern Review, and AGNI.

== Biography ==
Nicholas Montemarano was born in Brooklyn, New York and raised in Queens, New York.

Montemarano's first novel, A Fine Place, explored the aftermath of a racially motivated murder in Brooklyn. The novel was inspired by the real-life murder of Yusuf Hawkins in Bensonhurst in 1989. Jeffery Renard Allen, reviewing the novel in The Chicago Tribune, called A Fine Place "tight and well-crafted...small and transparent, like a paperweight, self-contained and compact, not a word wasted...a fine and important book."

A New York Times review of Montemarano's third novel, The Senator's Children, noted that the book was "based on the sad-but-true story of John Edwards." The reviewer, Sarah Lyall, compares The Senator's Children to Curtis Sittenfeld's Laura Bush-inspired novel, American Wife, saying that Montemarano "has humanized the Edwards story...with deftness and subtlety."

Montemarano's short story collection, If the Sky Falls, which the New York Times Book Review called "as dark and dazzling as a mine shaft studded with diamonds," was an Editors' Choice at the Book Review. One story in the collection, "The Worst Degree of Unforgivable," received a 2003 Pushcart Prize.

Montemarano has published nonfiction pieces in The Washington Post Magazine, DoubleTake, and the Los Angeles Times, all three dealing with issues of race.

He has received fellowships from the National Endowment for the Arts, the MacDowell Colony and Yaddo.

Montemarano received his MFA from the University of Massachusetts Amherst. He teaches at Franklin & Marshall College in Lancaster, Pennsylvania, and has also taught in the Bennington Writing Seminars.

== Bibliography ==
- If There Are Any Heavens: A Memoir (Persea Books, 2022)
- The Senator's Children (Tin House Books, 2017)
- The Book of Why (Little, Brown, 2013)
- If the Sky Falls (LSU, 2005)
- A Fine Place (Context Books, 2002)
