= From Scratch (TV series) =

2022 American drama limited series

- Netflix poster
- Created by: Attica Locke & Tembi Locke
- Inspired by: From Scratch: A Memoir of Love, Sicily and Finding Home by Tembi Locke
- Starring: Zoe Saldaña; Eugenio Mastrandrea; Danielle Deadwyler; Judith Scott; Kellita Smith; Lucia Sardo; Paride Benassai; Roberta Rigano; Keith David
- Music by: Laura Karpman; Raphael Saadiq
- Country of origin: United States
- Original language: English
- No. of episodes: 8

Production
- Executive producers: Attica Locke; Tembi Locke; Reese Witherspoon; Lauren Neustadter; Richard Abate; Jermaine Johnson; Will Rowbotham; Zoe Saldaña
- Producers: Bryan J. Raber; Mariel Saldaña; Cisely Saldaña; Judd Rea; Guy J. Louthan
- Production locations: Los Angeles, California; Florence, Italy; Palermo, Italy
- Cinematography: Brian Pearson; Patrick Murguia
- Editors: Jim Flynn; Shannon Baker Davis; Jordan Goldman; Tana Plaengprawat
- Running time: 49–58 minutes
- Production companies: This One & That One; 3 Arts Entertainment; Cinestar; Hello Sunshine

Original release
- Network: Netflix
- Release: October 21, 2022

From Scratch is an American romance drama television miniseries created by Attica Locke and Tembi Locke for Netflix. Inspired by Tembi Locke's memoir of the same name, it stars Zoe Saldaña and Eugenio Mastrandrea. Its eight episodes premiered on October 21, 2022. Attica Locke was series showrunner.

== Cast and characters ==
=== Main ===
- Zoe Saldaña as Amy
- Eugenio Mastrandrea as Lino
- Danielle Deadwyler as Zora
- Judith Scott as Maxine
- Kellita Smith as Lynn
- Lucia Sardo as Filomena
- Paride Benassai as Giacomo
- Roberta Rigano as Biagia
- Keith David as Hershel

=== Recurring ===
- Lorenzo Pozzan as Filippo
- Peter Mendoza as Andreas
- Jonathan D. King as Silvio
- Terrell Carter as Ken
- Saad Siddiqui as Dr. Atluri
- Rodney Gardiner as Preston
- Jonathan Del Arco as David

=== Guest ===
- Giacomo Gianniotti as Giancarlo Caldesi
- Medalion Rahimi as Laila Mahdi
- Elizabeth Anweis as Chloe Lim
- Kassandra Clementi as Caroline
- Ferdinando Gattuccio as Italian notary
- Claudia Gerini as art teacher

== Episodes ==
No.	Title	Directed by	Teleplay by	Original release date
1	"First Tastes"	Nzingha Stewart	Attica Locke & Tembi Locke	October 21, 2022
2	"Carne e Ossa"	Nzingha Stewart	Amy Wang	October 21, 2022
3	"A Villa. A Broom. A Cake."	Nzingha Stewart	Tembi Locke & Jason Coffey and J.J. Braider	October 21, 2022
4	"Bitter Almonds"	Dennie Gordon	Marguerite MacIntyre	October 21, 2022
5	"Bread and Brine"	Dennie Gordon	Joshua Allen	October 21, 2022
6	"Heirlooms"	Dennie Gordon	Jason Coffey	October 21, 2022
7	"Between the Fire and the Pan"	Nzingha Stewart	Marguerite MacIntyre	October 21, 2022
8	"Aftertastes"	Nzingha Stewart	Attica Locke & Tembi Locke and Joshua Allen	October 21, 2022

== Production ==
=== Development ===
The series was announced on November 7, 2019. Zoe Saldaña was set to star and executive-produce. The series was created by and executive-produced by Attica Locke and Tembi Locke. Reese Witherspoon, Lauren Neustadter, Richard Abate, Jermaine Johnson and Will Rowbotham were also executive producers. Nzingha Stewart, Guy Louthan, Emily Ferenbach, Cisely Saldaña, and Mariel Saldaña were its producers.

=== Casting ===
Alongside the series announcement, Zoe Saldaña was cast. In April 2021, Eugenio Mastrandrea, Danielle Deadwyler, Keith David, Kellita Smith, Judith Scott, Lucia Sardo, Paride Benassai, and Roberta Rigano were set to star. One month later, Terrell Carter, Medalion Rahimi, Jonathan Del Arco, Peter Mendoza, Lorenzo Pozzan, and Jonathan D. King were added as recurring. Giacomo Gianniotti, Elizabeth Anweis, Kassandra Clementi, and Rodney Gardiner were set as guest stars. In July 2021, Saad Siddiqui joined the cast as a recurring character.

=== Filming ===
Filming began in Los Angeles on April 5, 2021, and moved to Florence, Italy in July. Production ended on August 7, 2021 in Cefalù, Sicily.

== Reception ==
The review aggregator website Rotten Tomatoes reported a 94% approval rating with an average rating of 6.6/10, based on 12 critic reviews. The website's critics consensus reads, "By turns a buoyant and wistful romance, From Scratch is an emotionally resonant miniseries that benefits from its Italian scenery and Zoe Saldaña's considerable dramatic chops." Metacritic, which uses a weighted average, assigned a score of 67 out of 100 based on 8 critics, indicating "generally favorable reviews". Zoe Saldana was nominated for Outstanding Actress in a Television Movie, Mini-Series or Dramatic Special at the 54th NAACP Image Award.
