= Tembi Locke =

American actress and writer (active 1994– )

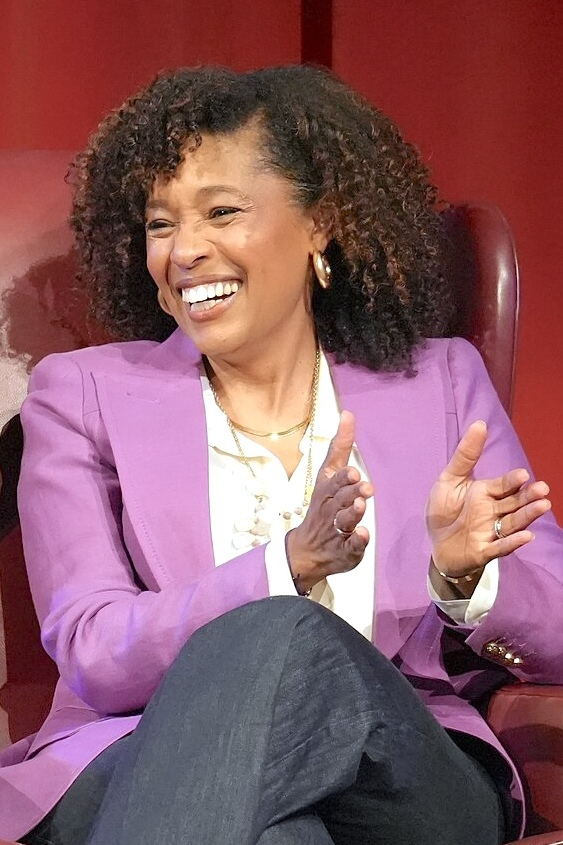
- Locke in 2025
- Occupations: Actress; writer
- Years active: 1994–present
- Spouses: Saro Gullo (m. 1995; died 2012) Robert (m. 2020)
- Children: 1

Tembi Locke is an American actress and writer who has appeared in television shows and film. She is best known as Dr. Grace Monroe on Syfy's series Eureka and as Dr. Diana Davis in Sliders. Locke is also the author of the bestselling memoir, From Scratch, which she later adapted into a limited series, with her sister Attica Locke for Netflix.

== Life and career ==
Locke and her husband, Rosario "Saro" Gullo, a Sicilian chef, lived and worked in Los Angeles, California. He died in 2012 from cancer. She married her partner Robert in 2020 whom she met in 2016.

== Career ==
While in New York, Locke appeared in several off-Broadway productions, and landed a role on the long-running soap opera As The World Turns. Afterward, she moved to Los Angeles. Her prime-time television career began by playing one of Will Smith's love interests on The Fresh Prince of Bel-Air.

Locke has appeared in numerous television dramas, comedies, and films over the course of her career. She played Dr. Grace Monroe, a biotech specialist, on seasons four and five of Syfy's series EUReKA (2010–2012). She also starred as Dr. Diana Davis on season five of the Fox/Syfy show Sliders (1999–2000).

Locke's television work includes shows such as Castle, Bones, The Mentalist, Windfall, CSI: NY, and Beverly Hills, 90210. Her comedic turns include Friends, The Jamie Foxx Show, House of Payne, Like Family, and Raising Dad, among others. She has appeared in a number of movies made for television, including Black Widow, Final Approach and Born in the USA. In 2014, Locke appeared as Dr. Walcott in Dumb and Dumber To.

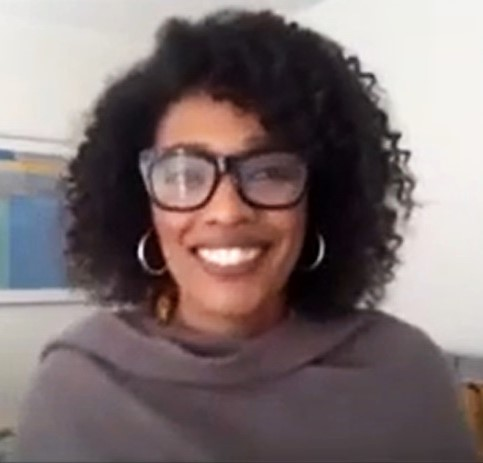
Locke in 2019

As of October 2018, her most recent work is in the second installment of Hulu original "Into the Dark" series. She plays the therapist in the episode Flesh & Blood.

Locke's memoir, From Scratch: A Memoir of Love, Sicily and Finding Home (published April 30, 2019), is about her romance with her Italian husband and her grief after his untimely death. From Scratch later adapted with her sister into a limited series, starring Zoe Saldaña. The series was produced by Reese Witherspoon's Hello Sunshine, 3 Arts, Cinestar. It was released by Netflix on October 22, 2022.

== Filmography ==
=== Film ===
Year	Title	Role	Notes
1996	Ringer	Neely	
1997	Steel	Norma	
1999	Unbowed	Cleola	
2003	Art of Revenge	Isabel ‘Izzy’ Bloom	Video
2010	Words Unspoken	Nurse Euphoria Mayes	Short
2011	Bucky Larson: Born to Be a Star	Guinness Woman	
2014	Dumb and Dumber To	Dr. Katie Walcott	
2018	Collusions	Regina Thomason	
2019	The Obituary of Tunde Johnson	Yomi Johnson	

=== Television ===
Year	Title	Role	Notes
1994	The Fresh Prince of Bel-Air	Valerie Johnson	Episode: ″Grumpy Young Men″
1995	Hangin' with Mr. Cooper	Mindy	Episode: “One Is the Loneliest Number”
1995	Me and the Boys	Sheryl	Episode: “The Age of Reason”
1995–96	Beverly Hills, 90210	Lisa Dixon	Recurring cast (season 6)
1996	Night Stand with Dick Dietrick	Fran	Episode: ″Athletes as Role Models”
1996	Martin	Linda Livingston	Episode: “Kicked to the Curb”
1996	Star Command	Ens. Meg Dundee	TV movie
1996	In the House	Shanna	Episodes: “One Love″ & “This is a Test”
1997	Claude's Crib	Kaylene	Main cast
1997	Hitz	Lisa	Episode: “Pilot”
1997	The Wayans Bros.	Donna	Episode: “Pops’ Daughter”
1997–98	Michael Hayes	Gina	Episodes: “True Blue” & “Vaughn Mower”
1998	The Jamie Foxx Show	Monique	Episode: “Guess Who’s Not Coming to Dinner?″
1999	Friends	Karin	Episode: “The One Where Ross Hugs Rachel”
1999–00	Sliders	Dr. Diana Davis	Main cast (season 5)
2000	Bull	-	Episodes: “One Night in Bangkok” & “In the Black”
2000	The Hughleys	Myisha	Episode: “Darryl’s Victory Tour”
2001–02	Raising Dad	Vice Principal Liz Taylor	Recurring cast
2002	One on One	Dr. Tiddlehorn	Episode: “Misery”
2003	Touched by an Angel	Amanda	Episode: “And a Nightingale Sang”
2003	The Division	Nora Lowell AKA Vick	Episode: “Misdirection”
2003	Eve	Cammie	Episode: “The Talk”
2004	Like Family	Ethel	Recurring cast
2004	The Bernie Mac Show	Mrs. Melanie Diggs	Episode: “Thanksgiving”
2004	Quintuplets	Jill	Episode: “(Disdainfully) the Helbergs”
2005	Unscripted	Olivia Ross	Episodes “Episode #1.8” & “Episode #1.10”
2006	CSI: NY	Ellen Fielding	Episode: “Charge of the Post”
2006	Windfall	Addie Townsend	Recurring cast
2007	The ½ Hour News Hour	-	Episode: “Town Hall: Identity Politics”
2008	House of Payne	Lisa	Episode: “Compromising Positions”
2009	The Mentalist	Marshal Christy Knox	Episode: “Red Sauce”
2010	Bones	Marilyn Stoddard	Episode: “The Predator in the Pool”
2010–12	Eureka	Dr. Grace Monroe	Main cast (seasons 4–5)
2012	Castle	Beth Cabot	Episode: “Secret Santa”
2014	NCIS	Alice Kent Staley	Episode: “The Searchers”
2015	Crazy Ex-Girlfriend	Doctor Tembi Blaine	Episode: “My First Thanksgiving with Josh!”
2015–16	The Magicians	Dr. Jennifer London	Episode: “Unauthorized Magic” & “The World in the Walls”
2016	12 Deadly Days	Ms Whitmore	Episode: “Singers Slaying”
2017	Private Dick	Judy	Episode: “Pilot”
2017	Doubt	Iris Taylor	Episode: “Finally”
2017	Animal Kingdom	Monica	Recurring cast (season 2)
2017	S.W.A.T.	Trisha Watson	Episode: “Imposters”
2017–18	NCIS: Los Angeles	Leigha Winters	Episodes: “Mountebank” & “Vendetta”
2018	Into the Dark	Dr. Helen Saunders	Episode: “Flesh & Blood”
2019	Proven Innocent	Vanessa Dale	Recurring cast
2020–23	Never Have I Ever	Elise Torres	Recurring cast (season 1), guest (1 episode each, seasons 2, 4)
2022	From Scratch	—N/a	Co-creator, writer and executive producer
TBA	Before I Let Go	—N/a	Writer, showrunner and executive producer

=== Video games ===
Year	Title	Role	Notes
1999	Fleet Command	Lieutenant Commander Jane Colter, USN Intelligence Officer	

== Bibliography ==
- From Scratch: A Memoir of Love, Sicily and Finding Home (2019)
