= You, Me and the Apocalypse =

2015 Sky TV program

- Genre: Comedy drama
- Created by: Iain Hollands
- Starring: Mathew Baynton; Joel Fry; Pauline Quirke; Jenna Fischer; Kyle Soller; Rob Lowe; Gaia Scodellaro; Paterson Joseph; Megan Mullally; Diana Rigg; Fabian McCallum
- Composer: Pieter A. Schlosser
- Countries of origin: United Kingdom; United States
- Original language: English
- No. of series: 1
- No. of episodes: 10

Production
- Executive producers: Cameron Roach; Lizzie Gray; Andrew Conrad; Juliette Howell; Tim Bevan; Eric Fellner; Lynn Horsford
- Producers: Polly Buckle; Nick Pitt; Susie Liggat
- Running time: 43 minutes
- Production companies: Working Title Films; BigBalls Films

Original release
- Network: Sky 1 (United Kingdom); NBC (United States)
- Release: 30 September – 2 December 2015

You, Me and the Apocalypse is a British-American comedy-drama miniseries. The series was green-lit on 8 January 2015. It debuted on Sky 1 on 30 September 2015 and on NBC on 28 January 2016. Sky 1 said in March 2016 there would be no second series.

== Plot ==
With their days numbered, a group of people struggle with the inevitable apocalypse after it is discovered that a comet is on a collision course with Earth.

Jamie Winton (Mathew Baynton) works as a bank manager in Slough, England, living with his best friend, Dave Bosley (Joel Fry), and his adoptive mother, Paula (Pauline Quirke). Jamie vows to find his wife, Layla (Karla Crome), who disappeared seven years earlier, and his biological mother before the comet hits. In one of many revelations that occurs before the comet strikes, he learns he has a twin brother named Ariel Conroy (also played by Baynton).

Meanwhile, Rhonda McNeil (Jenna Fischer) is imprisoned in New Mexico, United States, after taking the blame for a hacking crime committed against the National Security Agency by her son Spike (Fabian McCallum). There, she meets a white supremacist named Leanne (Megan Mullally).

In Washington, D.C., Rhonda's brother Scotty (Kyle Soller) and his husband, U.S. General Arnold Gaines (Paterson Joseph), are working to stop the comet that will cause the apocalypse.

At the Vatican, Father Jude (Rob Lowe) and Sister Celine (Gaia Scodellaro) work to find the potential Antichrist and the world's savior. In the end, as explained at the beginning of the series, most of these people will come to be in a bunker together under Slough as they watch the apocalypse on television.

== Cast ==
=== Main ===
- Mathew Baynton as estranged identical twin brothers Jamie Winton and Ariel Conroy. Jamie works as a bank manager in Slough and still hopes his wife—Layla—will return after going missing seven years ago on their honeymoon. Ariel is known as White Horse, the leader of the cyber terrorist group Deus Ex Machina.
- Joel Fry as Dave Bosley, Jamie's best friend and housemate.
- Pauline Quirke as Paula Winton, Jamie's adoptive mother.
- Rob Lowe as Father Jude Sutton, a foul mouthed, chain-smoking Vatican priest assigned to the recently reopened office of Devil's Advocate, tasked with confirming miracles and running background checks on potential saints.
- Gaia Scodellaro as Sister Celine Leonti, a young nun sent to the Vatican to work with the Devil's Advocate's office as Father Jude's partner.
- Jenna Fischer as Rhonda McNeil, a former librarian, is now imprisoned in a New Mexico maximum security prison to protect her son, Spike.
- Kyle Soller as Scotty McNeil, Rhonda's twin brother and a minor Washington bureaucrat in the Special Situations Group. He is married to Arnold Gaines.
- Paterson Joseph as Army Major General Arnold Gaines, the United States general spearheading the efforts to either stop the apocalypse or at least have humanity's future safely secured when it does come.
- Megan Mullally as Leanne Parkins, a white supremacist in prison with Rhonda. She is married to Todd and is the mother of Junior and Jolene. She escapes prison with Rhonda.
- Diana Rigg as Sutton, the mother of Jude, Rhonda, and Scotty, grandmother of Jamie, Ariel, and Spike, and great-grandmother of Frankie.
- Prasanna Puwanarajah as Rajesh McNeil, Rhonda's husband. He is hospitalized and terminally ill.
- Fabian McCallum as Spike McNeil, Rhonda's teenaged son and a hacker. His mother ended up in jail to protect him after he illegally hacked the NSA.
- Anastasia Hille as Mary Conroy. She gave birth to twins, first Jamie and then Ariel, and abandoned Jamie as a newborn in a cardboard box at a church car park in Slough.
- Karla Crome as Layla, Jamie's wife who disappeared seven years ago.
- Grace Taylor as Frankie, Layla and Jamie's six-year-old daughter who (until series 1 episode 6) Jamie was unaware existed.

=== Guest ===
- Nick Offerman as Buddy, a cross-dressing man in his fifties who, after finding out Rhonda is a convict, holds her at gunpoint until the police arrive.
- Adam Nagaitis as Todd Jr.
- Pippa Winslow as US Politician, a politician in a cabinet meeting discussing and focuses on the task given to her.

== Episodes ==
A group of people, each living their own, unconnected lives, are introduced. It is revealed that a comet is due to hit Earth in 34 days. Some of these people can be seen in a bunker together under the town of Slough, in the UK, as they watch the events unfolding up to the end of the world on TV.

| No. | Title | Directed by | Written by | Original release date | | UK; viewers (millions) | |
|---|---|---|---|---|---|---|---|
| 1 | "34 Days to Go" "Who Are These People?" | Michael Engler | Iain Hollands | 30 September 2015 | 28 January 2016 | 1.28 | 5.02 |
Jamie Winton, a bank manager from Slough, is arrested after police suspect him to be the leader of a terrorist hacking group called Deus Ex Machina. After his alibi checks out, Jamie comes to learn that he has a twin brother called Ariel and that his mother Paula adopted him when he was a baby. Jamie also discovers that his wife Layla, who he believed had disappeared during their honeymoon, is alive and was last seen with Ariel. In New Mexico, Rhonda McNeil, a librarian, is arrested and placed in a maximum security prison for hacking into the NSA. Rhonda is terrified of her new surroundings and inmates but refuses to give up her son, Spike, who actually did the hacking, and faces the rest of her life in prison. Rhonda is saved from a group beating by Leanne, a white supremacist. However, as the apocalypse is announced, a riot breaks out and Ariel appears to hack into the prison system to rescue Rhonda, as well as Leanne who stowed away. In Rome, Sister Celine Leonti is offered a job interview to work for the Vatican. She is interviewed by Father Jude, an unconventional priest who smokes, drinks and curses. The job is to work with Jude as a "Devil's Advocate" in the canonization of potential saints. Jude works to prove that the required miracles are false, so there is no question when a potential Saint is canonized in the church. She initially refuses but decides to take the job. After the news of the asteroid becomes public, their job is changed to seeking out potential candidates for the Second Coming of Jesus as foretold in Revelations.
| 2 | "33 Days to Go" "An Erotic Odyssey" | Michael Engler | Iain Hollands | 7 October 2015 | 4 February 2016 | 0.85 | 3.47 |
With limited time left on Earth, Jamie declares he is going to find Layla and get her back. Along with his flatmate Dave, Jamie decides that the best way to do this is to find his birth mother who may be able to tell him where Ariel is. Paula gives him an address that was found with Jamie when he was abandoned. Jamie and Dave travel across the country to the address but are taken hostage by a blond woman, who believes Jamie is Ariel. Meanwhile, in Washington DC, the US government begins to work on plans to stop the comet and save the world. The president seeks the advice of General Arnold Gaines and Scotty McNeil, Rhonda's brother, who specialise in end of the world disasters for the US government. Scotty declares the only way to stop the comet would be if the world pulls their resources together to do so, causing the US to work with its allies and enemies. In New Mexico, Ariel and his friend Max are excited to meet Rhonda, believing her to be the only person to hack the NSA. During the escape, a suicide jumper falls onto the ambulance they're in and they crash, with Leanne left stuck inside. Ariel, Rhonda and Max leave Leanne behind but Rhonda reveals who she really is and Ariel abandons her and leaves to find Spike. Rhonda then returns to Leanne to help continue their escape. In the Vatican, Jude sees no point continuing his work with Sister Celine but is called in front of his superiors, who request he begin researching second messiahs.
| 3 | "32 Days to Go" "Still Stuff Worth Fighting For" | Saul Metzstein | Iain Hollands | 14 October 2015 | 11 February 2016 | 0.82 | 2.97 |
Jamie and Dave are being held hostage by Skye, one of Ariel's exes, who is heavily pregnant. After threatening them with a nail gun, Skye's water breaks and she releases Jamie and Dave to help her, successfully, give birth. Believing Jamie is who he says he is, Skye warns him not to go after Ariel but gives him the address for where his birth mother now resides in Scotland anyway. Rhonda and Leanne continue their escape from prison. They try to steal clothes from a house but Rhonda is caught and held at gunpoint by Buddy, a cross-dresser. Rhonda and Buddy bond and Rhonda has the chance to talk to Scotty about finding Spike, who has been taken into custody by his birth father, and Rajesh, her critically ill husband. Believing he can claim a large reward for Rhonda, Buddy phones the police on her, but she is rescued by Leanne who is pretending to be a police officer. At the same time, Ariel meets Spike and "rescues" him from his father. Scotty and Gaines begin Project Saviour, an operation using the world's finest minds to stop the comet hitting Earth. Gaines discovers that Scotty has been talking to Rhonda but does not give him up as it is revealed they are lovers. Meanwhile, Jude and Celine travel to Warsaw to investigate a false messiah. They meet Frankie, a 6 year old girl who returned from the dead after a car crash at the same time the apocalypse was announced. As a result, a large mob formed outside the hospital she is in, believing she is the second coming of Christ. They meet Frankie's mother, Layla, revealing that Frankie is Jamie's daughter. Deciding she is not the messiah, Jude provides a distraction as Celine helps Layla and Frankie escape the hospital.
| 4 | "26 Days to Go" "What Happens to Idiots" | Saul Metzstein | Geoff Bussetil and Ben Vanstone, Iain Hollands | 21 October 2015 | 18 February 2016 | 0.68 | 2.57 |
| 5 | "23 Days to Go" "Right in the Nuts" | Saul Metzstein | Sarah Dollard | 28 October 2015 | 25 February 2016 | 0.64 | 2.58 |
| 6 | "17 Days to Go" "Home Sweet Home" | Tim Kirkby | Iain Hollands | 4 November 2015 | 3 March 2016 | 0.52 | 2.34 |
| 7 | "14 Days to Go" "T Minus..." | Tim Kirkby | Iain Hollands, Julian Jones, Richard Welsh | 11 November 2015 | 10 March 2016 | 0.57 | 2.22 |
| 8 | "7 Days to Go" "Saviour Day" | Tim Kirkby | Iain Hollands, Mickey Down | 18 November 2015 | 17 March 2016 | 0.64 | 2.76 |
| 9 | "24 Hours to Go" "Calm Before the Storm" | Saul Metzstein | Iain Hollands | 25 November 2015 | 24 March 2016 | 0.64 | 2.68 |
| 10 | "The End of the World" "End of Days" | Saul Metzstein | Iain Hollands | 2 December 2015 | 31 March 2016 | 0.60 | 2.80 |
Rhonda, Leanne, Scotty and Gaines escape the compound and board a plane headed for Slough and the bunker, along with Spike and Rajesh. Meanwhile, Frankie hears voices in her head and rescues Jamie from the bank vault with the recently married Paula and Dave. Celine discovers that she is pregnant with Jude's child and the whole group drive to Windsor to save Layla from Ariel. Layla and Ariel look desperately for Frankie and head to the bunker where they believe she is. However, Ariel lets slip that he is not Jamie and Layla crashes the car and escapes, leaving an unconscious Ariel behind. Layla then stumbles on Jamie and his group and they all head to the bunker together as small meteorites beginning hitting Earth. One meteorite hits the plane that Rhonda is in, which crash lands in Slough. Rhonda, Scotty, Gaines, Leanne, Spike and Rajesh hijack a truck and drive to the bunker site, getting inside and reuniting Scotty and Rhonda with their presumed deceased mother. Just outside Slough, Jamie, Layla, Frankie, Celine, Paula and Dave are stuck on one side of the River Thames after the bridge is destroyed by debris. Desperate to get across Jamie, somehow, parts the River Thames, proving to Paula that he is the son of God after all. The group successfully cross the Thames and arrive at the bunker. However, debris has ruined the front door and it will not lock. The group devise a plan to close the door using the truck Rhonda hijacked, which means leaving someone behind. Rajesh nominates himself to shut the door, telling Rhonda that he is dying anyway and can't survive much longer. All get inside except Rajesh and Jamie, who helps to move the truck while a figure approaches from behind. Rajesh tells Jamie to get inside, who does so, just as the door closes and locks everyone inside. They sit down and watch the TV to see the inevitable. Outside, Rajesh watches as a giant smoke cloud engulfs the area. A naked Jamie crawls his way towards him, revealing that Ariel had once again attacked him and stolen his clothing, pretending to be Jamie to get inside the bunker. Rajesh says it is too late and their fate is left unknown. The screen fades as the camera pulls in to view Ariel within the bunker, who grins at his final success.

== Reception ==
The series met favourable responses from critics. On Metacritic, it holds a score of 72/100 based on 26 reviews. On Rotten Tomatoes, it holds an 83% approval rating based on 31 reviews, with an average rating of 7.4/10. The critics' consensus reads: "You, Me, and the Apocalypse has a lot of fun with the end of the world, if you can keep up with its unpredictable, oddball twists."

== Production ==
The bunker scenes were shot at West London Film Studios on Stage 2.
