= Gaia Scodellaro =

Italian actress (born 1985)

- Born: July 15, 1985 (age 40); Naples, Italy
- Occupations: Actress; dancer; singer
- Years active: 2009–present

Gaia Scodellaro (Naples, 15 July 1985) is an Italian actress and dancer.

== Biography ==
Scodellaro is the daughter of a former Neapolitan male model and Karen Ford, an African-American dancer. After spending the first ten years of her life in Naples, her family moved to the Bronx, New York. She was strongly influenced by her mother's dancing skills and studied singing, acting and dancing. In 2005 she returned to Naples and gained her first professional experience in these fields. In 2009, she debuted in Berlin with a burlesque entitled "Ambrosia". Since 2010, she has been on Italian television in various roles, from Cugino & cugino to the web series Stuck - The Chronicles of David Rea. Her breakthrough in Italy came with the soap opera CentoVetrine, in which she played the role of Frida Baroni. In 2013 she was in the film Un'insolita vendemmia (An Unusual Harvest) with most of the cast of the soap. In the same year she was in Watch Them Fall with Marco Bocci. In 2022, she was in the cast of the series That Dirty Black Bag in the role of Lara. Her first role in a major international production was with Denzel Washington in The Equalizer 3 (2023), directed by Antoine Fuqua, in which she plays the role of Aminah. The movie was set on the Amalfi Coast, close to Scodellaro's native city of Naples.

== Filmography ==
=== Film ===
- Come Non Detto, directed by Ivan Silvestrini (2012)
- An unusual harvest, directed by Daniele Carnacina (2013)
- Andròn: The Black Labyrinth, directed by Francesco Cinquemani (2015)
- Watch Them Fall, directed by Kristoph Tassin (2016)
- Promises, directed by Amanda Sthers (2021)
- State of Consciousness, directed by Markus Stokes (2022)
- The Equalizer 3, directed by Antoine Fuqua (2023)

=== Television ===
- Cousin & Cousin, directed by Vittorio Sindoni – episode 1x11 (2011)
- Horro vacui – TV miniseries (2013)
- CentoVetrine – soap opera (2013)
- Hands Inside the City, directed by Alessandro Angelini – TV series (2014)
- Anti-mafia squad - Palermo today – TV series, episodes 6x05, 6x07 (2014)
- The Three Roses of Eva 3, directed by Raffaele Mertes – TV series (2015)
- You, Me and the Apocalypse – TV series (2015)
- Livstid – TV series, 1 episode (2020)
- That Dirty Black Bag – TV series, 6 episodes (2022)
- Signora Volpe – TV series, episode 1x01 (2022)

=== Internet ===
- Stuck – The Chronicles of David Rea (2012)
- Vera Bes (2014)
- Duels - Saying Goodbye (2014)

== Theaterography ==
- Keep your head to the sky
- Voices of Wisdom
- Cinderella...Sort of
- Show at the Black and White Mediterranean Theater
- Ambrosia: An evening of Lifestyle
