= Rob Franklin =

American writer

Robert Michael Franklin is an American writer.

Franklin is best known for his debut novel, Great Black Hope (2025), a literary fiction novel published by Simon & Schuster in June 2025. In 2025, the novel won the Ernest J. Gaines Award for Literary Excellence, and was longlisted for the Center for Fiction First Novel Prize and the Andrew Carnegie Medal for Excellence in Fiction. It was named one of the best books of 2025 by NPR, Time, Vanity Fair, and Vogue.

Franklin was born in 1993 or 1994, and grew up in Atlanta. He received a Bachelor of Arts from Stanford University and a Master of Fine Arts in creative writing from New York University. As of 2026, Franklin lived in New York.
