= St. Petersburg Review =

American literary magazine

- Categories: literary magazine
- First issue: August 1, 2007; 17 years ago
- Country: United States
- Based in: Concord, New Hampshire
- Language: English
- Website: www.stpetersburgreview.com

St. Petersburg Review is an American literary magazine whose mission is to provide a forum for cultural and literary exchange reflective of current social, political, and literary landscapes. The magazine is based in Concord, New Hampshire.

It is not to be confused with bilingual magazine «Санкт-Петербургское обозрение — St. Petersburg Review, which was an official edition of Pulkovo Aviation Enterprise from 1995 to 1998 before being renamed to Inflight Review.

== History ==
The 216-page inaugural issue of the journal was released in the United States on August 1, 2007. It published 48 pieces (poetry, fiction, and nonfiction) by 34 writers; 28, or 58 percent, of the pieces are in translation, and 16 of the authors (47 percent) are non-American, many, in the issue, Russian writers some of whom teach or lecture at SLS (Summer Literary Seminar) while other are women poets from Gulag. The first issue contains work by such American notables as Jeffery Renard Allen, Aimee Bender, Padgett Powell, Liz Rosenberg, and George Saunders. The editor of the magazine is Elizabeth L. Hodges; the first issue is guest edited by Mikhail Iossel.

In the first two weeks of SPR’s launch, over 200 copies were sold and/or distributed.

In keeping with the SPR’s stated goal of providing a forum for vibrant cultural and literary exchange reflective of current social, political, and literary landscapes, a section of the journal is devoted to a collection of writing from women in the GULAG, translations of which are being published for the first time in the United States. On June 29, SPR brought the one-act play based on these writings and others, A Road We Did Not Choose, to the St. Petersburg theater museum, where it was introduced by American playwright Laura Maria Censabella to much acclaim from the audience, many of whom followed the play in the English program provided.

== See also ==
- List of literary magazines
