= The Equalizer 3 =

2023 film by Antoine Fuqua

- Theatrical release poster
- Directed by: Antoine Fuqua
- Written by: Richard Wenk
- Based on: The Equalizer by: Michael Sloan; Richard Lindheim
- Produced by: Todd Black; Jason Blumenthal; Denzel Washington; Antoine Fuqua; Steve Tisch; Clayton Townsend; Alex Siskin; Tony Eldridge
- Starring: Denzel Washington; Dakota Fanning; David Denman
- Cinematography: Robert Richardson
- Edited by: Conrad Buff
- Music by: Marcelo Zarvos
- Production companies: Columbia Pictures; Eagle Pictures; Escape Artists; Zhiv Productions
- Distributed by: Sony Pictures Releasing
- Release dates: August 28, 2023 (Rome); September 1, 2023 (United States)
- Running time: 109 minutes
- Country: United States
- Languages: English; Italian
- Budget: $70 million
- Box office: $191.1 million

The Equalizer 3 is a 2023 American vigilante action-thriller film directed by Antoine Fuqua. It is a sequel to The Equalizer 2 and is the third installment of The Equalizer film series, which is based on the television series of the same name. The film stars Denzel Washington, reprising his role as retired U.S. Marine and DIA officer Robert McCall. Dakota Fanning, Eugenio Mastrandrea, David Denman, Gaia Scodellaro, and Remo Girone play supporting roles. In the film, McCall discovers that his new friends in a small town in Southern Italy are intimidated by Camorra members and sets out to save them from the threat.

Talks over a third entry to The Equalizer franchise began following the release of The Equalizer 2 on August 2, 2018. Following a long delay due to the COVID-19 pandemic, the project was officially announced in January 2022. Filming took place in Italy, concluding in January 2023.

The Equalizer 3 was released in the United States on September 1, 2023, by Sony Pictures Releasing. The film received generally positive reviews from critics and was a commercial success, like its predecessors, grossing $191.1 million worldwide. A fourth and fifth film are in development.

== Plot ==
At a secluded winery in Sicily, Robert McCall kills the gangster Lorenzo Vitale and his henchmen to obtain a key to the winery's vault to recoup money stolen in a cyber-heist. While McCall is leaving the winery, Vitale's grandson shoots him in the back. McCall contemplates suicide due to the injury, but reconsiders and then takes the ferry back to the mainland.

While driving on the Amalfi Coast, McCall pulls over and slips into unconsciousness from shock. Gio Bonucci, a local carabiniere marshal, encounters and rescues him. He brings McCall to the remote coastal Italian town Altamonte, where Dr. Enzo Arisio treats him.

As he recovers from the shooting, McCall becomes acquainted with the locals and grows fond of them and their village. Anonymously, he places a telephone call to CIA officer Emma Collins to tip her off about the winery's clandestine role in the illegal drug trade. Collins and other CIA operatives discover enormous amounts of cash as well as bags of fenethylline tablets hidden in a storeroom, confirming McCall's suspicions. She locates McCall in Altamonte and they continue to cooperate.

Meanwhile, members of the Camorra (run by brothers Vincent and Marco Quaranta) harass and kill villagers in an attempt to coerce them out of their housing and take over Altamonte for commercialisation purposes. McCall overhears Marco pressuring local store owner Angelo for payments. To make an example of Angelo, the Camorra firebombs his fish store as the town watches.

Gio reviews video of the firebombing and calls the Italian central police for an inquiry. Having captured Gio's wife and daughter to lure him, the Camorra attack Gio and beat him for interfering in their operations. They had been alerted by an informant within the police. Marco demands that Gio set up a boat for him with contacts in Somalia to expand his operations. Overhearing the conversation, McCall asks Marco to move his operations to a different location to leave the townspeople alone. When he refuses, McCall kills him and his henchmen.

An enraged Vincent threatens and tortures the Naples police chief and instructs him to find the person responsible for Marco's death. Collins's car is rigged with a bomb by Vincent, but she survives the blast and is instead hospitalized. Vincent returns to Altamonte, and, in front of the townspeople, threatens to kill Gio unless Marco's killer is identified. McCall reveals himself, but the citizens begin to protest, recording Vincent and his henchmen with their camera phones as he prepares to kill McCall. Vincent and his cadre retreat. They regroup at his mansion, planning to retaliate the following day.

That night, McCall infiltrates Vincent's mansion. He kills Vincent's bodyguards one by one and administers to Vincent a lethal dose of the drugs Vincent has been selling throughout Europe. With McCall by his side, Vincent stumbles dazed and gasping for breath out of his mansion into the dark streets and alleys of the town, before he collapses and dies from the forced overdose. Through Collins, McCall transfers cash he had taken from the winery to an elderly couple who had lost that amount when their pension fund was hacked and stolen.

At CIA headquarters, Collins receives recognition for her contribution to ending the Altamonte drug trade. She receives a package that contains a book of contacts and a note from McCall. The note states that her mother would be proud of her; a photo on her desk reveals that Collins is the daughter of McCall's late friend and colleague, Susan Plummer.

As the danger of the Quaranta brothers has been removed, McCall celebrates with the locals in Altamonte after their football team's victory.

== Cast ==
- Denzel Washington as Robert McCall
- Dakota Fanning as Emma Collins
- Eugenio Mastrandrea as Gio Bonucci
- David Denman as Frank Conroy
- Gaia Scodellaro as Aminah
- Remo Girone as Enzo Arisio
- Andrea Scarduzio as Vincent Quaranta
- Andrea Dodero as Marco Quaranta
- Daniele Perrone as Angelo
- Dea Lanzaro as Gabriella Bonucci
- Sonia Ben Ammar as Chiara Bonucci
- Bruno Bilotta as Lorenzo Vitale
- Adolfo Margiotta as Chief Barella, Naples Chief of Police
- Salvatore Ruocco as Vincent's Man
- Alessandro Pess as Viking

== Production ==
In August 2018, Antoine Fuqua announced his plans to continue the film series. The filmmaker expressed interest in the plot taking place in an international setting.

In January 2022, a third film was officially confirmed to be in development, with Denzel Washington returning in the titular role. Washington was paid $20 million for his involvement. In June 2022, Dakota Fanning was announced to have been cast as well, partnering with Washington 19 years after Man on Fire (2004). By November 2022, Sonia Ben Ammar, Andrea Dodero, Remo Girone, Eugenio Mastrandrea, Daniele Perrone, Andrea Scarduzio, and Gaia Scodellaro were added to the cast. Production designer Naomi Shohan spent a month in Italy scouting locations, before selecting the village of Atrani as the main setting for the film.

Principal photography began on October 10, 2022, on the Amalfi Coast in Italy. Filming continued in the region until November 20, after which it moved to Naples in early December, before wrapping production by January 2023, in Rome. Fuqua once again served as director, with Washington announcing that it would be his next movie. Robert Richardson serves as director of photography on the project, after previously working with Fuqua on Emancipation.

== Music ==
The Equalizer 3 (Original Motion Picture Soundtrack)

Soundtrack album by Marcelo Zarvos
- Released: September 1, 2023
- Genre: Film score
- Label: Madison Gate Records
- Producer: Marcelo Zarvos

In May 2023, Marcelo Zarvos was brought in to score the film's music after previously collaborating with Fuqua in Brooklyn's Finest (2009), What's My Name: Muhammad Ali (2019), The Guilty (2021) and Emancipation (2022). He replaced Harry Gregson-Williams, who scored the previous instalments in the trilogy as well as Fuqua's The Replacement Killers and Infinite. Love, Disorderly by Thomas Azier was added as a soundtrack to the film.

== Release ==
=== Theatrical ===
The Equalizer 3 was released by Sony Pictures Releasing on September 1, 2023, in both conventional formats and IMAX. It received a release on premium video on demand formats on October 3, 2023.

== Reception ==
=== Box office ===
The Equalizer 3 grossed $92.4 million in the United States and Canada, and $98.7 million in other territories, for a worldwide total of $191.1 million.

In the United States and Canada, The Equalizer 3 was projected to gross $28–30 million from 3,965 theaters in its opening weekend, and a total of $33–40 million over the four-day Labor Day frame. The film made $13.1 million on its first day, including $3.8 million from Thursday night previews, up from the totals of the first ($1.5 million) and second ($3.1 million) films. It went on to debut to $34.6 million (and a total of $42.8 million over the four days), topping the box office and marking the second-best Labor Day weekend of all time, after Shang-Chi and the Legend of the Ten Rings (2021). In its second weekend, the film fell 65% to $12 million, finishing second behind newcomer The Nun II.

Its biggest territories outside the United States and Canada were the United Kingdom ($10.2 million), Germany ($8.4 million), Australia ($7 million), and France ($6.7 million).

=== Critical response ===
On the review aggregator website Rotten Tomatoes, 76% of 168 critics' reviews are positive, with an average rating of 6.3/10. The website's consensus reads: "Another entertaining outing from Antoine Fuqua and Denzel Washington, The Equalizer 3 mostly makes up for its formulaic story with generous helpings of cathartic action." Metacritic, which uses a weighted average, assigned the film a score of 58 out of 100, based on 38 critics, indicating "mixed or average" reviews. Audiences surveyed by CinemaScore gave the film an average grade of "A" on an A+ to F scale, same as the previous installment, while those polled at PostTrak gave it a 90% overall positive score, with 72% saying they would definitely recommend the film.

The Independent's Clarrise Loughrey gave the film 3 out of 5 stars, writing, "At its best – and The Equalizer 3 is about as good as the first film – it neatly counterbalances Fuqua's baroque, blood-and-guts action with Washington's ability to command attention while sitting perfectly still." The Sunday Times's Tom Shone also gave it 3 out of 5 stars, writing, "Whether enjoying a cappuccino, flirting with a waitress or snapping men's forearms, Washington makes it all seem like a movie star enjoying a midlife dolce vita moment." Kyle Smith of The Wall Street Journal wrote, "For those who can tolerate extreme violence, The Equalizer 3 is diverting enough. If the script is so-so, the beautiful Italian locations, Mr. Washington's still-world-class charm and an eerie, frightening musical score by Marcelo Zarvos lift it."

=== Accolades ===
The film was nominated at the Saturn Award for Best Action or Adventure Film, while Fuqua was nominated for Outstanding Directing in a Motion Picture and Washington for Outstanding Actor in a Motion Picture at the 55th NAACP Image Awards.

== Future ==
In August 2023, Antoine Fuqua stated that there had been discussions about developing a prequel movie detailing the origins of Robert McCall. The filmmaker stated that using de-aging technology to make Washington appear younger was an option and that he would also consider casting John David Washington or Michael B. Jordan in the role of McCall. Later that month, Fuqua stated that while The Equalizer 3 was talked about internally as the final film in the franchise, he would be interested in returning as director for a future installment if Washington were interested in returning as well.

In November 2024, Washington announced that he had agreed to perform in two new movies: The Equalizer 4 and The Equalizer 5.
