= The Beautiful Things That Heaven Bears =

2007 novel by Dinaw Mengestu

- Cover of the 2008 Riverhead edition
- Author: Dinaw Mengestu
- Original title: The Beautiful Things That Heaven Bears (US); Children of the Revolution (UK)
- Language: English
- Genre: Fiction
- Publisher: Penguin Group (US); Random House (UK)
- Publication date: 2007
- Pages: 240
- ISBN: 978-1594482854

The Beautiful Things That Heaven Bears is the first novel by the Ethiopian author Dinaw Mengestu. Published in 2007 by the Penguin Group, the novel focuses on the life of Sepha Stephanos, an Ethiopian immigrant living in Washington, D.C. after fleeing his country's revolution seventeen years earlier. Running a failing grocery store he ruminates on the past as he faces his own inward crisis of displacement and identity while simultaneously marveling at the gentrification of his neighborhood. This book took almost four years to write and Mengestu spent the most of a year revising it. The original version of this novel was published in the UK as Children of the Revolution. The name was changed by the publishers before being published in the US because they did not want the book to sound political. The Beautiful Things That Heaven Bears (2007) was translated into 12 languages, and named a New York Times Notable Book. The book was also awarded the Guardian First Book Award and a Los Angeles Times Book Prize for a new author Art Seidenbaum Award for First Fiction, among numerous other honors.

== Plot ==
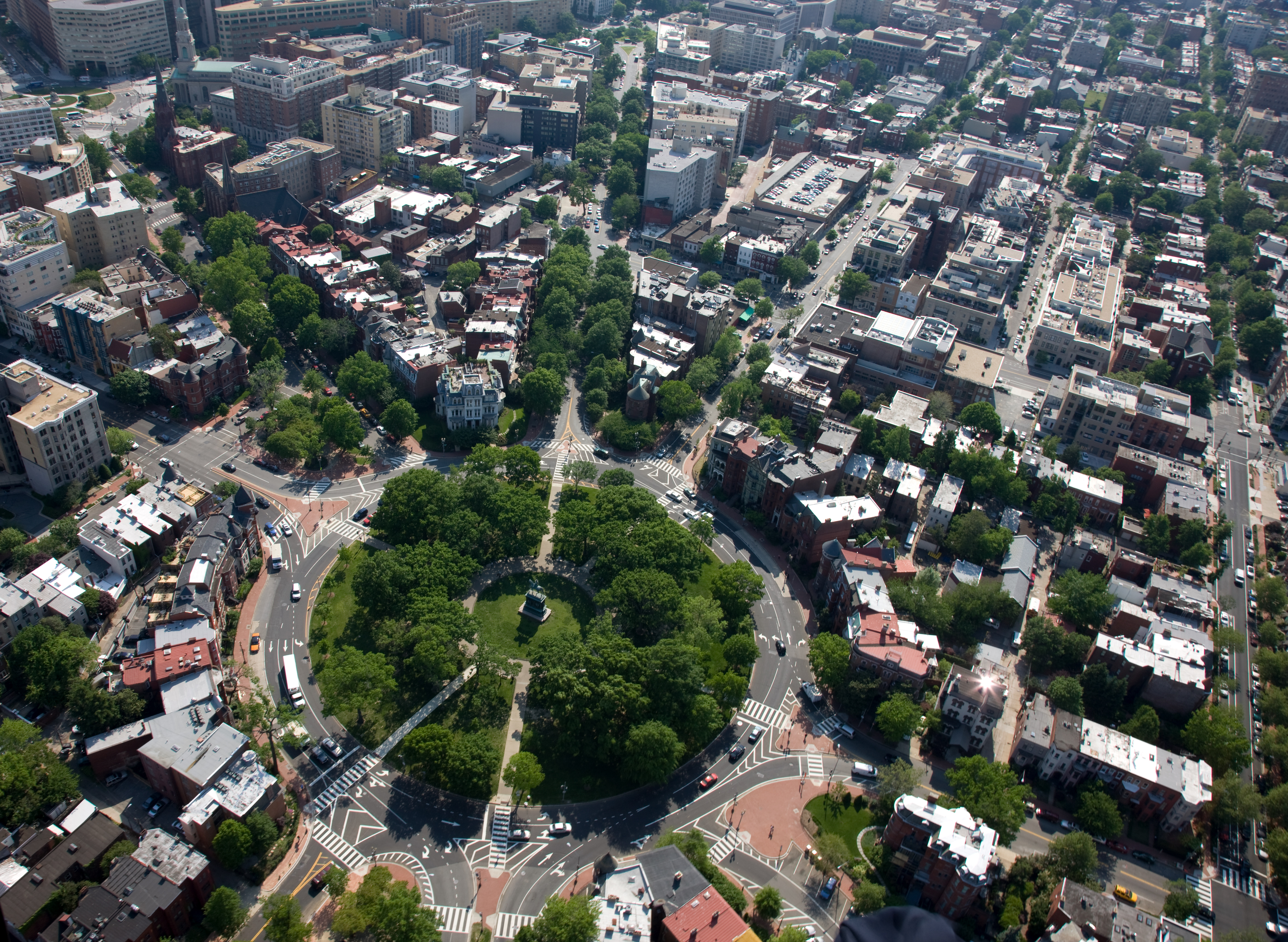
Logan Circle, Washington, D.C.

The Beautiful Things That Heaven Bears is about an Ethiopian immigrant, Sepha Stephanos, who owns a small grocery store. Stuck between two identities — that of his Ethiopian roots, and that of his American immigrant status — he connects almost immediately with Naomi, a half-black 11-year-old, who moves with her mother, Judith McMasterson, to Logan Circle, the small, run-down neighborhood where Stephanos lives. This is rather remarkable, considering Judith is the first white person to live there: "Before Judith, these were the only reasons white people had ever come into the neighborhood: to deliver official notices, investigate crimes and check up on the children of negligent parents", but demonstrates the creeping effects of "urban renewal" or "gentrification".

Because of the dreadful events of his past and the melancholy status of his present, Stephanos is frozen in time, unable to make any progressive steps. He often plays a game with his friends, Congo Joe and Ken the Kenyan, in which they name the many coups of Africa and when they reigned, which demonstrates an unrewarding, nonsensical nostalgia for the place they once called home. Joe clarifies, "when the coup stops…so will the game" which, from what we see, is a long time coming. Stephanos’ efforts to define himself are somewhat lackluster: although he has lived in America for 17 years, he has shown little growth or signs of assimilation besides his move from "Little Ethiopia", an apartment building in Silver Spring where Ethiopians maintain their lifestyle and culture, and the founding of his less-than-profitable business. Even in his relationship with Judith, he refuses to take action, besides a kiss that is less of a kiss and more of a "pressing", as he describes it. Although there are many rather substantial plot developments — from the eviction notice of the store to the escalation of violence against Judith — Stephanos stays resistant to change and growth throughout.

== Structure ==
The story is divided into chapters alternating between the past and present. This organization of the novel provides another venue for which the topic of loss of identity are brought into the story.

== Characters ==
=== Sepha Stephanos ===
Sepha is the central figure and narrator of the novel, Sepha Stephanos is an Ethiopian immigrant running a shabby convenience store off Logan Circle in Washington. Having fled his home country in the wake of a military coup seventeen years before, Stephanos finds himself isolated in America, condemned to sit alone in his failing store and reminisce about the neighborhood, his position and his past. His only solace comes in the form of two friends, fellow immigrants Kenneth and Joe, as well as Judith and Naomi who have recently moved into Logan Circle. Being an immigrant, Stephanos finds himself caught between the worlds of Ethiopia and America, causing the man to struggle with a sense of identity and placement.

=== Naomi ===
Judith's eleven-year-old daughter, Naomi is biracial and perceptively intelligent for her age. At times unruly and prone to fits and running away from her single mother, Naomi and her quirky ways befriend Stephanos through frequent visits to his store where they read books together. Bonded through their mutual loss of fathers, Naomi is comforted by this friendship just as much as Stephanos. Naomi's arrival with her mother to Logan Circle as well as her Caucasian and African background serve to highlight the gentrification and cultural conflicts of the neighborhood.

=== Judith ===
Judith is a single mother, having separated from Naomi's Mauritanian father, who moves into Logan Circle and renovates a rundown townhouse adjacent to Stephanos' apartment. Judith was a "professor of American political history" (Mengestu 54) who often found herself moving around the country with Naomi. Over the course of Judith's stay in Logan Circle, she finds herself in a tentative romantic situation with Stephanos. Judith's position as a well-to-do white woman with a biracial daughter entering a poorer neighborhood further the ideas of gentrification within the novel.

=== Joseph ===
"Congo Joe" as he is referred to, is one of Stephanos' two friends at the beginning of the novel. A fellow immigrant, he worked with Stephanos and Kenneth in a hotel during their first months in America and they bonded over their mutual status as African immigrants. Now working at a well-known restaurant, Joe often writes and reads poetry and fancies himself an intellectual, representing the effects and misconceptions of the American Dream on those arriving to America.

=== Kenneth ===
"Ken the Kenyan" is Stephanos' only other friend, having met together with Joe during their first jobs. Now holding a position as an engineer, Ken is hopeful yet practical of his status and his prospects. Despite his moderate success, he finds himself just as out of place as Joe and Sepha, strengthening their bonded friendship.

=== Berhane Selassie ===
Berhane is Sepha's uncle and only relative in the United States. After being forced to flee his affluent lifestyle in Ethiopia, Berhane goes to America forced to work for low wages and to hold a second job as a cab driver. Living in a heavily Ethiopian apartment complex, he is extremely nostalgic as evidenced by the collection of letters he keeps carefully tucked away and his reminiscing of the past.

=== Mrs. Davis ===
Mrs. Davis is the long time neighbor of Stephanos who can often be found around Logan Circle and sweeping the streets. Her judgmental focus on Judith's presence in the neighborhood as well as her other actions are indicative of stasis and the community's resistance to change.

== Themes ==
=== The reality of the American dream ===
A prevalent theme throughout is the notion of the American dream - an immigrant coming to America to escape the unrest in their home country to achieve a better life in America. This is essentially what Stephanos does in escaping a revolution and starting his own business. The title itself is an excerpt from Dante's Inferno, in which Dante is led out of Hell (in the same way an immigrant supposedly is) and offered a look at what is possible. In this case it would be America, and the search for a better life. However, a big part in this book is realizing the reality of this dream. Often, the portrayal of Stephanos as a lonely store owner evokes the solitude that all immigrants sometimes feel. Stephanos is faced with challenge after challenge, and his hope and expectations waver throughout his challenging journey towards this better life he thought he was promised.

=== Gentrification and "urban renewal" ===
A prominent theme throughout the book is the rising trend towards gentrification and an "urban renewal". One can see from the time that Judith moves into the neighborhood that the feeling of the city is changing fast. Judith herself is a prime symbol of this theme, as she brings with her the trend towards this urban renewal that is so fiercely resisted by the community. More than this, there is a clear relation between this gentrification and the life of an immigrant. Just as Stephanos needed to flee Ethiopia, people are being forced out of their neighborhoods. Guns are replaced with eviction notices and people are forced out in much the same way.

=== Identity and belonging ===
Stephanos, is faced with the challenge of looking for a sort of home as he enters America. From the time he enters America, he attempts to gain this feeling through the monumental setting of Washington D.C., by owning a shop, by emerging himself in the typical "American" lifestyle. However, even then the search is not over. Mengestu, in his life as an immigrant has noted that Stephanos "is driven by a search for a sort of home ... what I think is a pretty universal and pretty common feeling".

=== Departure and arrival ===
A clear theme throughout is the prevalence of departure and arrival. According to the New York Times, "Almost every page reminds us that "departure" and "arrival" are deceptively decisive words. Airport terminals, passenger lounges and customs posts cement the illusion that we know when we’re coming and going." As Stephanos continues his journey through his life in America, not only does his past signify the departure aspect, but every action leads him to the observance of a new departure and arrival. He goes from place to place, and in the same way that he feels displaced, he often finds that leaving and coming back are two things central to any life journey - whether they be large scale or small scale.

=== Friendship ===
Though this story is focused on Stephanos and his struggle, Rob Nixon of the University of Wisconsin notes that "the deeply felt pain in Mengestu’s novel is offset by the solace of friendship — whether it’s a friendship that hovers on the verge of romance, a friendship between an adult and a child or, above all, the friendships that steady the daily lives of fellow immigrants". A theme and trend throughout the novel's backbone is the importance of these friendships in getting by. They are intertwined with the notion of immigrants. Though Stephanos often struggles and acts as though he is alone, the notion comes back to relationships and the importance of them in not only the bad parts of life but the good parts as well.

== About the author ==
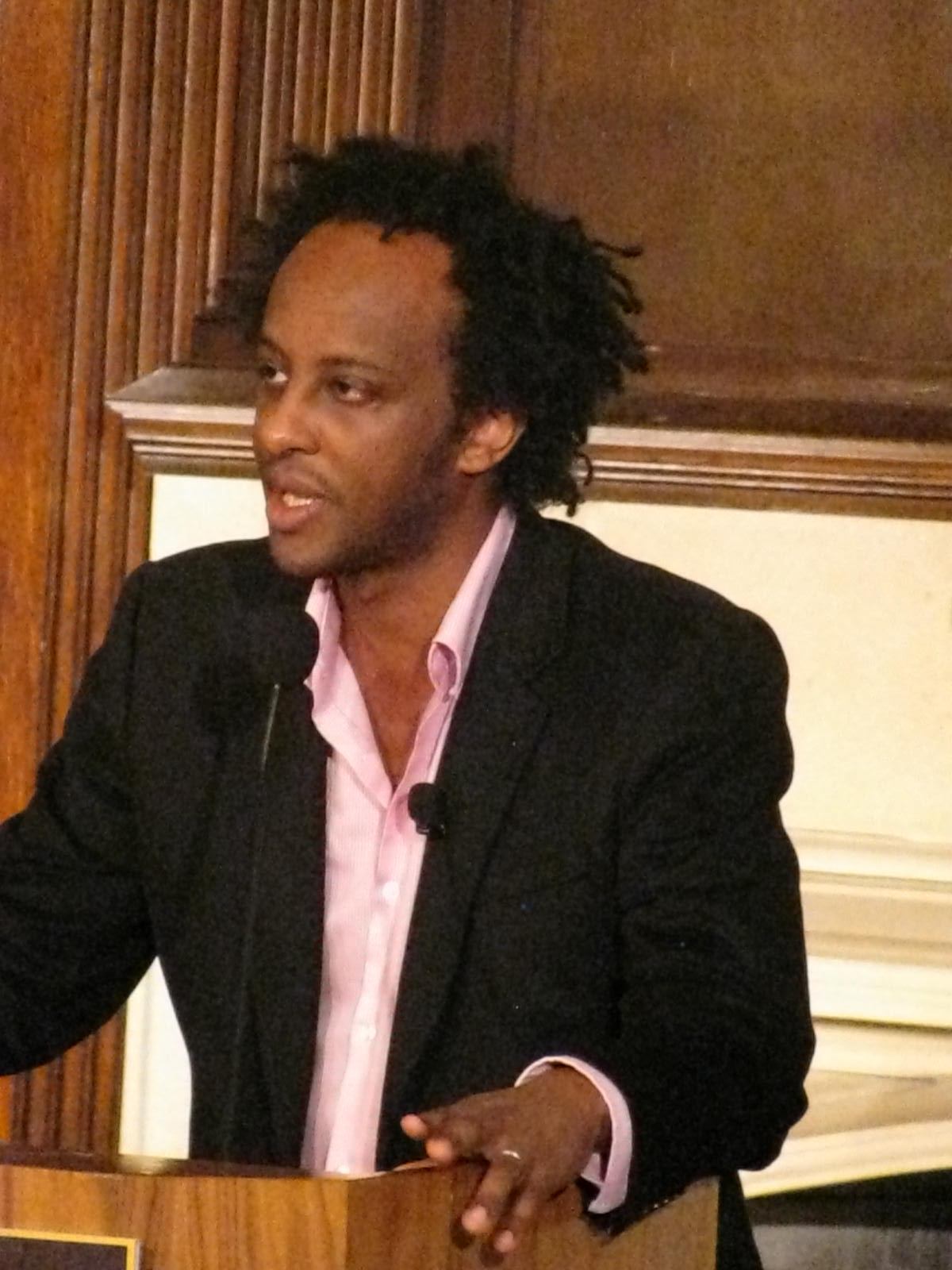
Dinaw Mengestu (Retrieved from: Slowking)

Dinaw Mengestu (pronounced dih- now men-guess-too) was born in Addis Ababa, Ethiopia, in 1978 to Tesfaye and Hirut Mengestu. Before his birth, the communist revolution forced Tesfaye to flee to the United States, where Dinaw, his mother and sister joined him in 1980. After settling in Peoria, Illinois, the Mengestu family eventually moved to the Chicago area. Dinaw graduated in 1996 from Fenwick High School in Oak Park, Illinois, where he ran cross-country.

He is a graduate of Georgetown University with a B.A. in English, and Columbia University with a M.F.A. in fiction. Mengestu is the recipient of a 2006 fellowship in fiction from the New York Foundation for the Arts, and was the Lannan Visiting Writer at Georgetown University for spring 2007. He received a "5 Under 35" Award from the National Book Foundation as well as one of The New Yorker's "20 under 40". In 2012, he was a MacArthur Foundation Fellowship recipient and was one of 23 to be awarded a "genius" grant from the foundation.

As a freelance journalist, Mengestu has traveled to war-torn regions of sub-Saharan Africa to write about life in Darfur, northern Uganda and eastern Congo near the border with Rwanda. His journalism and fiction have appeared in several publications including Harper's, Granta, Rolling Stone, The New Yorker and The Wall Street Journal. Mengestu has resided in New York and Paris, and recently returned to Washington, DC, with his wife Anne-Emmanuelle and their two sons. He is currently serving as Lannan Foundation Chair of Poetics at Georgetown University.

== Critical response ==
"What more potent setting is there than Washington for a novel about the architecture of hope and memory?", The New York Times

"The novel's dirge-like tone may put off readers looking for the next Kite Runner, but Mengestu's assured prose and haunting set pieces ... are heart-rending and indelible." Publishers Weekly

"What lifts Children of the Revolution beyond the bounds of an immigrant's misery memoir is the captivating acuity of Mengestu's prose". The Guardian

"It was a textured story about the immigrants' struggle in America, rendered in beautiful prose and from the perspective of an African shop-owner in Washington, DC." The Economist

Mengestu's first novel has received generally favorable reviews by critics, with notable papers such as The New York Times, The Washington Post and The Guardian giving it credit. There has been nearly unanimous praise for Mengestu's sense of prose and depiction of issues that apply not only to the immigrant experience but also transcend such boundaries. The Beautiful Things That Heaven Bears has contributed to The New Yorker naming Dinaw Mengestu one of their "20 Under 40" writers and has also won several awards and recognition including:

- One of The New York Times Notable Books of 2007
- Guardian First Book Award
- National Book Foundation's 5 Under 35
- Seattle Reads Selection of 2008

== Awards ==
Year	Award	Category	Result	Ref
2007	Grand Prix des Lectrices de Elle	Roman	Shortlisted	
2007	Guardian First Book Award	—	Won	
2007	Prix du Premier Roman	Étranger	Won	
2007	Prix Femina étranger	—	Longlisted	
2008	Dylan Thomas Prize	—	Shortlisted	
2008	Los Angeles Times Book Prize	Art Seidenbaum Award for First Fiction	Won	
2008	Young Lions Fiction Award	—	Shortlisted	

== See also ==
- Ethiopians in Washington, D.C.
