= Bluebird, Bluebird =

2017 novel by Attica Locke

- First edition (publ. Mulholland Books)
- Author: Attica Locke
- Genre: Crime fiction
- Published: 2017
- Followed by: Heaven, My Home (2019)

Bluebird, Bluebird is a 2017 novel by Attica Locke. Its main character is an African-American Texas Ranger, Darren Matthews, from the eastern part of the state. He investigates the death of another African-American, a Chicago lawyer named Michael Wright, in the town of Lark.

The novel has the subtitle "A Highway 59 Novel" as the story takes place around that route; Locke herself had family members living in communities along that road.

Neely Tucker of The Washington Post wrote that the setting "feels stuck in a sepia-toned time warp."

Esi Edugyan of The Guardian wrote that the work is "a narrative of exhilarating immediacy" which has "hallmarks of modern crime fiction" with some of its own character.

In 2018, the novel won the Edgar Award for Best Novel.
