= Eugenio Mastrandrea =

Italian actor (born 1993)

Eugenio Mastrandrea (born 9th December 1993) is an Italian actor known for his role as Lino in the 2022 Netflix series From Scratch.

Mastrandrea was born in Rome, Italy. He graduated from the Silvio D’amico National Academy of Dramatic Arts.

He appeared in the 2012 film A.C.A.B as Giancarlo and in the 2021 Italian television series La Fuggitiva as Marcello Favini.

In 2022, Mastrandrea made his American debut in the Netflix series From Scratch, playing the lead role of Lino Ortolano. He appeared in the film The Equalizer 3 with Denzel Washington, which was filmed in Italy in 2022.

== Filmography ==
=== Film and television ===
Year	Title	Role(s)	Notes
2012	ACAB – All Cops Are Bastards	Giancarlo	Feature film debut
2018	Carlo & Malik	Zanussi	Episode: "Le verità nascoste"
2021	La fuggitiva	Marcello Favini	Main role
2022	From Scratch	Lino Ortolano	Lead role
2023	The Equalizer 3	Marshal Giorgio Bonucci	Film
2024	Don Matteo	Captain Diego Martini	Main role
