= Dinaw Mengestu =

Ethiopian-American novelist and writer (born 1978)

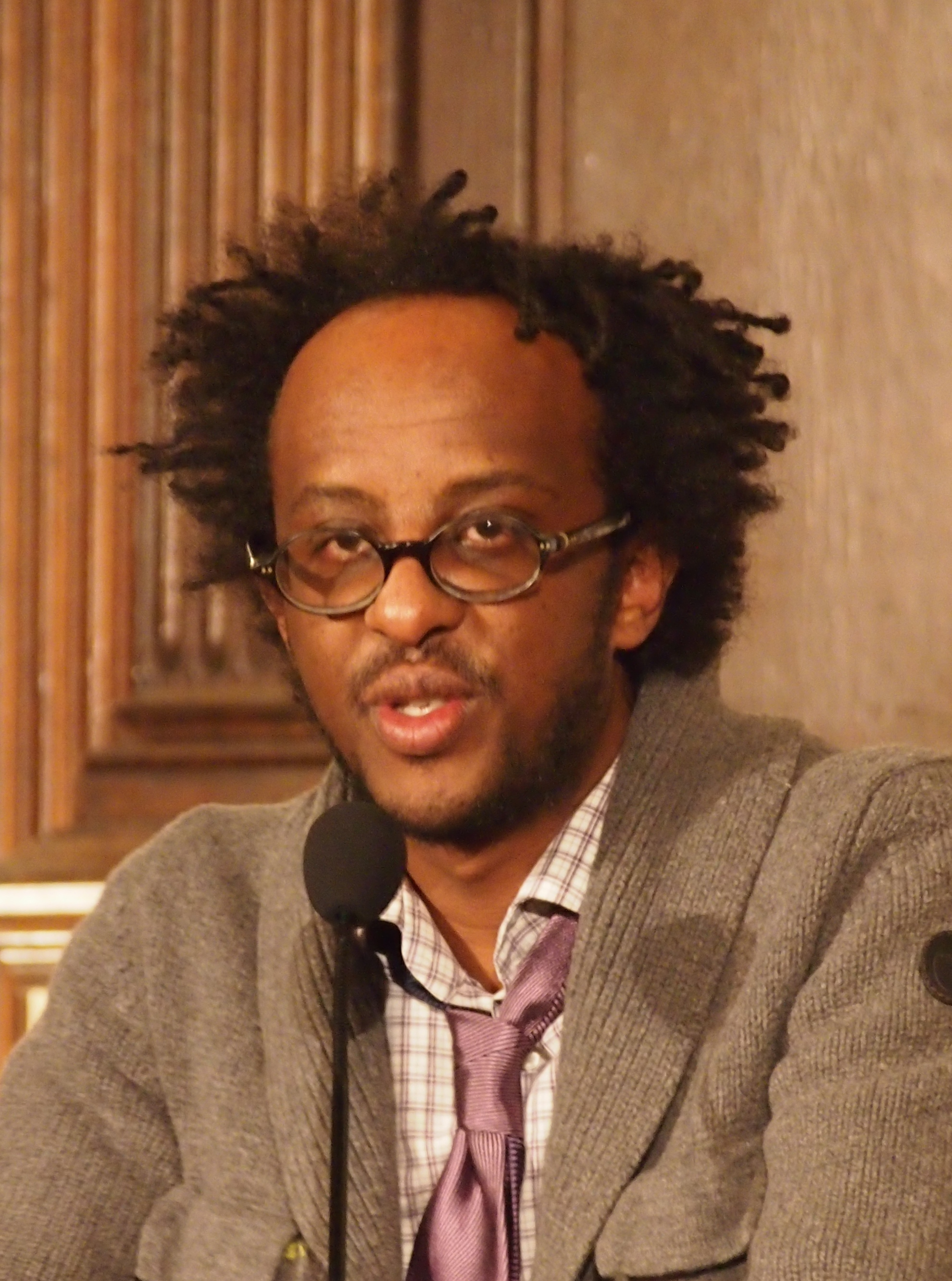
- Dinaw Mengestu in March 2014
- Born: June 30, 1978 (age 48); Addis Ababa, Ethiopia
- Education: Georgetown University (BA); Columbia University (MFA)
- Occupations: Novelist, professor of creative writing
- Writing career
- Notable awards: MacArthur Fellow, 5 under 35 honoree
- Movements: Realism, postmodernism

Dinaw Mengestu (Amharic: ዲናው መንግስቱ; born 30 June 1978) is an Ethiopian American novelist and writer. In addition to four novels, he has written for Rolling Stone on the war in Darfur, and for Jane Magazine on the conflict in northern Uganda. His writing has also appeared in Harper's Magazine, The Wall Street Journal, and numerous other publications.

He is the Program Director of Written Arts at Bard College. In 2007 the National Book Foundation named him a "5 under 35" honoree. Since his first book was published in 2007, he has received numerous literary awards, and was selected as a MacArthur Fellow in 2012.

== Early life ==
Dinaw Mengestu was born in Addis Ababa, Ethiopia in 1978, during a period of political repression that became known as the Red Terror. His father, who was an executive with Ethiopian Airlines, applied for political asylum while on a business trip in Italy; Mengestu's mother was pregnant with him at the time. Two years later, when Mengestu was a toddler, he, his mother and his sister were reunited with his father in the United States. The family settled in Peoria, Illinois, where Mengestu's father at first worked as a factory laborer, before rising to a management position. Later the family moved to the Chicago area, where Mengestu graduated from Fenwick High School in Oak Park, Illinois.

Mengestu received his B.A. in English from Georgetown University, and his MFA in writing from Columbia University in 2005.

== Career ==
Mengestu's début novel, The Beautiful Things That Heaven Bears, was published in the United States in March 2007 by Riverhead Books. It was published in the United Kingdom as Children of the Revolution, issued in May 2007 by Jonathan Cape. It tells the story of Sepha Stephanos, who fled the warfare of the Ethiopian Revolution 17 years before and immigrated to the United States. He owns and runs a failing grocery store in Logan Circle, then a poor African-American section of Washington, D.C. that was becoming gentrified. He and two fellow African immigrants, all of them single, deal with feelings of isolation and nostalgia for home. Stephanos becomes involved with a white woman and her young daughter, who move into a renovated house in the neighborhood.

Mengestu's second novel, How to Read the Air, was published in October 2010. Part of the novel was excerpted in the July 12, 2010, issue of The New Yorker, after Mengestu was selected as one of their "20 under 40" writers of 2010. This novel was the winner of the 2011 Ernest J. Gaines Award for Literary Excellence, a literary award established by the Baton Rouge Area Foundation in 2007.

Mengestu's first two novels have been translated into more than a dozen languages.

In 2014, he was selected for the Hay Festival's Africa39 project as one of 39 Sub-Saharan African writers aged under 40 with the potential and the talent to define the trends of the region.

In 2016, Mengestu became a board trustee at PEN America. In December 2025, he was elected to a two-year term as president of PEN America and chair of its board of trustees. In July 2026, Mengestu resigned from his position as the president of PEN America in protest of a controversial report on boycotts targeting Jewish and Israeli authors. In a statement posted to his Instagram, Mengestu wrote that his departure was due to "PEN America’s ongoing failure to defend free expression fairly and equitably, and about its production of work that supports suppression through bigotry and indifference."

== Awards and honors ==
=== Literary honors ===
- New York Times Notable Book 2007

=== Literary awards ===
Year	Book	Award	Category	Result	Ref
2007	The Beautiful Things That Heaven Bears	Grand Prix des Lectrices de Elle	Roman	Shortlisted	
2007	The Beautiful Things That Heaven Bears	Guardian First Book Award	—	Won	
2007	The Beautiful Things That Heaven Bears	Prix du Premier Roman	Étranger	Won	
2007	The Beautiful Things That Heaven Bears	Prix Femina étranger	—	Longlisted	
2008	The Beautiful Things That Heaven Bears	Dylan Thomas Prize	—	Shortlisted	
2008	The Beautiful Things That Heaven Bears	Los Angeles Times Book Prize	Art Seidenbaum Award for First Fiction	Won	
2008	The Beautiful Things That Heaven Bears	Young Lions Fiction Award	—	Shortlisted	
2011	How to Read the Air	Ernest J. Gaines Award for Literary Excellence	—	Won	
2011	—	Vilcek Prize	Creative Promise in Literature	Won	

=== Honors ===
- The New Yorker "20 Under 40", 2010
- Lannan Fiction Fellowship, 2007
- National Book Award Foundation, 5 Under 35 Award, 2007
- MacArthur Foundation Fellow, 2012

== Bibliography ==
=== Books ===
- —— (2007). The Beautiful Things That Heaven Bears (1st ed.). New York: Riverhead Books. ISBN 9781594489402.
- —— (2010). How to Read the Air. Penguin. ISBN 9781594487705.
- —— (2014). All Our Names. Knopf. ISBN 9780385349987.
- —— (2024). Someone Like Us (hardcover 1st ed.). Knopf. ISBN 9780385350006.

=== Essays ===
- —— (Autumn 2009). "Big money". Granta (108): 135–149.
