= Pleasantville (novel) =

2015 novel by Attica Locke

- Author: Attica Locke
- Genre: Crime fiction
- Published: 2015

Pleasantville is a 2015 mystery thriller novel by Attica Locke. It is a sequel to her debut novel Black Water Rising (2009).

== Plot summary ==
In 1996, Houston attorney Jay Porter, a single father of two after the death of his wife, investigates the disappearance of teenage political campaign Alicia Nowell during a contested mayoral race.

== Reception ==
The novel received positive reviews from critics. Kirkus Reviews wrote that it "serves up a panorama of nuanced characters and writes with intelligence and depth." Publishers Weekly described the story as rushed but wrote that "the twist-filled plot will keep readers eagerly turning the pages." In The Guardian, Alison Brook praised Locke for "bringing her cast of characters to vivid life with small, unobtrusive brush strokes."
