= Attica Locke =

American writer (born 1974)

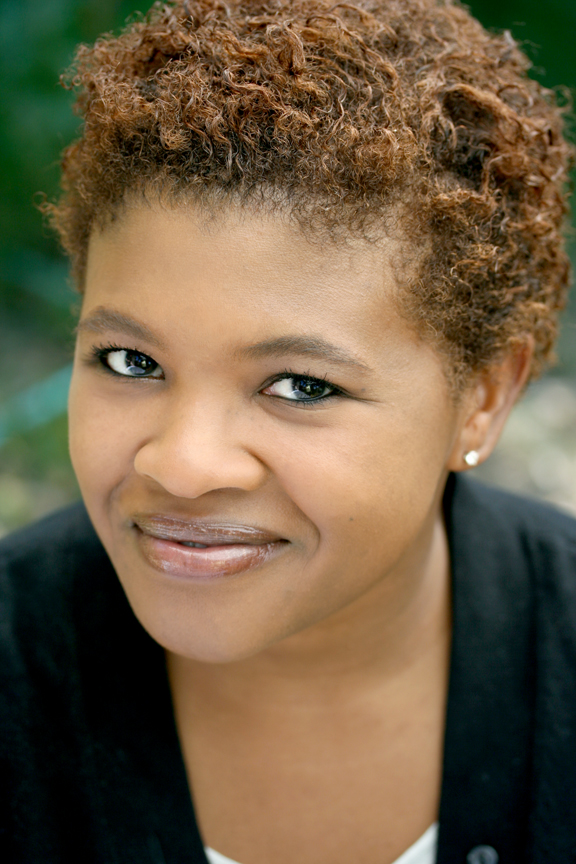
- Born: 1974 (age 51–52); Houston, Texas, U.S.
- Education: Northwestern University School of Communication
- Relatives: Tembi Locke (sister)
- Writing career
- Language: English
- Genres: Fiction, television, film
- Website: atticalocke.com

Attica Locke (born 1974) is an American fiction author and writer/producer for television and film.

== Career ==
Locke graduated from Northwestern University School of Communication in 1995, and was a fellow at the Sundance Institute's Feature Filmmakers Lab in 1999, where she studied screenwriting and directing. She has written scripts for Paramount, Warner Bros., Disney, 20th Century Fox, Jerry Bruckheimer Films, HBO, and DreamWorks. She was a writer and producer on the Fox drama Empire. Most recently, she was a writer and producer on Netflix's When They See Us and the Hulu adaptation of Little Fires Everywhere.

In 2021, it was announced that she would serve as executive producer and showrunner for the Netflix limited Series From Scratch,. The series is based on the 2019 memoir entitled From Scratch: A Memoir of Love, Sicily and Finding Home by her sister Tembi Locke, who she adapted the book with Attica. It premiered on Netflix on October 22 2022.

In 2026, she is a showrunner for Before I Let Go by Kennedy Ryan.

In 2023, she was elected as a Royal Society of Literature International Writer.

== Personal life ==
Locke was born in Houston, Texas, to parents who were active in the civil rights movement at the turn of the 1970s. They named her after the 1971 Attica Prison rebellion in upstate New York.

She now lives in Los Angeles, California, with her husband and daughter. Actress Tembi Locke is her older sister.

She is a member of the Writers Guild of America, West. She is an honorary member of Alpha Kappa Alpha sorority.

== Bibliography ==
- Black Water Rising (2009), HarperCollins
- The Cutting Season (2012), Dennis Lehane / HarperCollins
- Pleasantville (2015), HarperCollins
- Bluebird, Bluebird (2017), Mulholland Books
- Heaven, My Home (2019), Mulholland Books. This book was mentioned in the New York Times article "The Best Crime Novels of the Year".
- Guide Me Home (2024), Mulholland Books

== Filmography ==
| Year | Title | Creator | Showrunner | Writer | Executive producer | Notes |
|---|---|---|---|---|---|---|
| 1998 | World's Wildest Police Videos | No | No | No | Associate | |
| 1999 | Early Edition | No | No | Yes (1) | No | |
| 2015–17 | Empire | No | No | Yes (7) | Supervising | |
| 2019 | When They See Us | No | No | Yes (1) | No | |
| 2020 | Little Fires Everywhere | No | No | Yes (1) | Co-executive | |
| 2022 | From Scratch | Yes | Yes | Yes (2) | Yes | |
| TBA | Before I Let Go | No | Yes | Yes | Yes | |

== Awards ==
- 2013: Ernest J. Gaines Award for Literary Excellence – The Cutting Season, (award sponsored by the Baton Rouge Area Foundation; established in 2007 to honor Ernest Gaines' legacy)
- 2016: Harper Lee Prize for Legal Fiction, 2016 – Pleasantville – the award is sponsored by the University of Alabama School of Law and the American Bar Association Journal.
- 2018: Edgar Allan Poe Award for Best Novel of the Year – Bluebird, Bluebird
- 2018: Anthony Award for Best Novel – Bluebird, Bluebird
- 2018: CWA Ian Fleming Steel Dagger Award – Bluebird, Bluebird
- 2020: Staunch Book Prize – Heaven, My Home

=== Nominations ===
For Bluebird, Bluebird:

- 2018 Los Angeles Times Book Award finalist

For Pleasantville:

- Longlisted for the 2016 Bailey's Women's Prize for Fiction

For The Cutting Season:

- Finalist for the Hurston/Wright Legacy Award
- Honor Book by the Black Caucus of the American Library Association
- Long-listed for the Chautauqua Prize

For Black Water Rising:

- Short-listed for the 2010 Orange Prize
- Nominated for a 2010 Edgar Award
- Nominated for a 2010 NAACP Image Award
- 2009 Los Angeles Times Book Award finalist
- Nominated for a 2009 Strand Magazine Critics Award
- Finalist for the Hurston/Wright Legacy Award
- Indie Next Pick 2009 & 2010
