= Black Water Rising =

2009 novel by Attica Locke

- Author: Attica Locke
- Genre: Crime fiction
- Published: 2009
- Followed by: Pleasantville (2015)

Black Water Rising is a 2009 mystery thriller novel by Attica Locke. Its sequel is titled Pleasantville (2015).

== Plot summary ==
In 1981, Jay Porter, a Black personal injury attorney in Houston, takes his pregnant wife on a nighttime boat tour of the Buffalo Bayou. They hear the sound of gunshots and a person falling into the water, and Jay dives in to rescue a white woman. The woman refuses to explain what happened and Jay later learns that a man was also killed on the Bayou that night.

== Reception ==
The novel received positive reviews from critics, although some critics felt that it was overwritten. In The Independent, Stuart Evers felt that the use of "convoluted similes" were "minor faults in an impressive, well-plotted and intelligent crime drama." Kirkus Reviews wrote that "Locke expertly etches a portrait of her anxiety-ridden protagonist, and she animates the complex plot with the assurance of a practiced screenwriter." Publishers Weekly wrote that Locke "steers a gritty drama to a satisfying end, though a sluggish subplot involving labor union issues undermines the novels grander ambitions."
