= Heaven, My Home =

2019 novel by Attica Locke

- Author: Attica Locke
- Genre: Crime fiction
- Published: 2019
- Preceded by: Bluebird, Bluebird (2017)

Heaven, My Home is a 2019 novel by Attica Locke. It is a sequel to Bluebird, Bluebird (2017), part of the Highway 59 series.

== Plot summary ==
Texas Ranger Darren Matthews is sent to the town of Jefferson on the Texas side of Caddo Lake to investigate the disappearance of an imprisoned white supremacist's son.

== Reception ==
The novel received overwhelmingly positive reviews from critics. Several critics praised the detailed and compelling portrayal of East Texas, and complex moral dilemmas faced by the characters. It was named a Publishers Weekly Pick of the Week and was named one of the best crime novels of the year by The New York Times.
