= Stephanie Powell Watts =

American writer

External videos
- Stephanie Powell Watts - We Are Taking Only What We Need, July 24, 2013

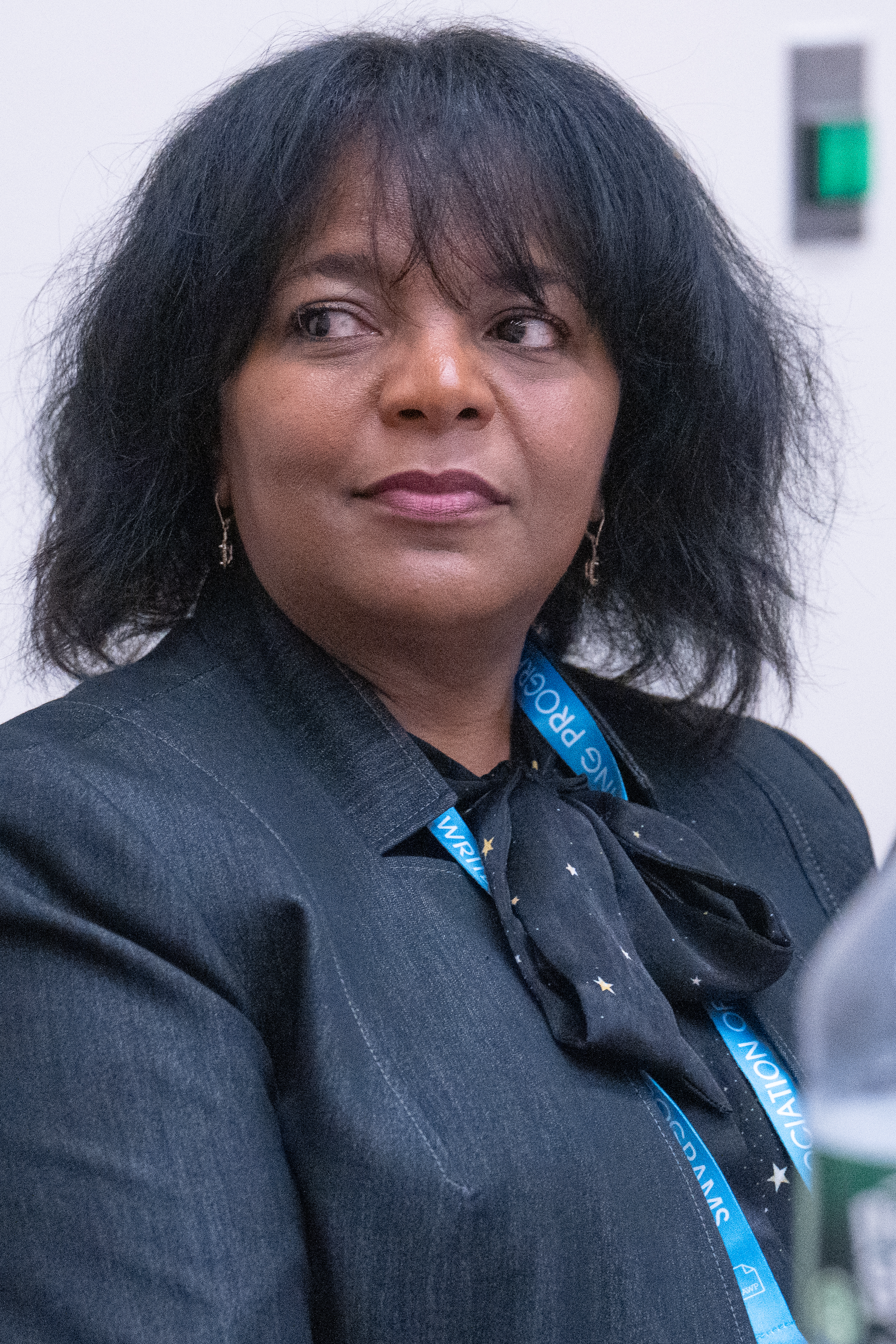
Watts at AWP 2026

Stephanie Powell Watts is an American author. She won a Whiting Award in 2013 and an Ernest J. Gaines Award for Literary Excellence in 2012 for her book We are Taking Only what We Need, a collection of 11 stories that chronicles the lives of African-Americans in North Carolina. Her short fiction has been included in two volumes of the Best New Stories from the South anthology and honored with a Pushcart Prize.

Watts' debut novel, No One Is Coming to Save Us, was published by Ecco in 2017. The story follows the return of a successful native son to his home in North Carolina and his attempt to join the only family he ever wanted but never had. As Watts describes it, "Imagine The Great Gatsby set in rural North Carolina, nine decades later, with desperate black people."

== Life ==
Watts was born and raised in Lenoir, North Carolina, in the foothills of the Blue Ridge Mountains. She received her BA from the University of North Carolina at Charlotte and her PhD from the University of Missouri. She lives with her husband and son in Pennsylvania where she is an associate professor of English at Lehigh University.

== Works ==
- We are Taking Only what We Need BkMk Press, University of Missouri-Kansas City, 2011, ISBN 9781886157798
- No One Is Coming to Save Us, Ecco, 2017, 978-0062472984
