= Ernest J. Gaines Award for Literary Excellence =

American literary award

- Awarded for: rising African American fiction authors
- Sponsored by: Baton Rouge Area Foundation
- Location: Baton Rouge
- Country: United States
- Eligibility: Black American fiction authors
- Reward: US$15,000
- First award: 2007
- Currently held by: Aaliyah Bilal
- Website: Official website

The Ernest J. Gaines Award for Literary Excellence is an annual national literary award designed to recognize rising African-American fiction writers. First awarded in 2007, the prize is underwritten by donors of the Baton Rouge Area Foundation in honor of the literary heritage provided by author Ernest J. Gaines, with the winner receiving a cash award (US$15,000 as of 2020) "to support and enable the writer to focus on writing." It has been described as "the nation's biggest prize for African-American writers".

== Past winners ==
Ernest J. Gaines Award winners
Year	Author	Title
2007	Olympia Vernon	A Killing in This Town
2008	Ravi Howard	Like Trees, Walking
2009	Jeffery Renard Allen	Holding Pattern: Stories
2010	Victor LaValle	Big Machine
2011	Dinaw Mengestu	How to Read the Air
2012	Stephanie Powell Watts	We Are Taking Only What We Need
2013	Attica Locke	The Cutting Season
2014	Mitchell S. Jackson	The Residue Years
2015	T. Geronimo Johnson	Welcome to Braggsville
2016	Crystal Wilkinson	The Birds of Opulence
2017	Ladee Hubbard	The Talented Ribkins
2018	Jamel Brinkley	A Lucky Man
2019	Bryan Washington	Lot
2020	Gabriel Bump	Everywhere You Don't Belong
2021	Nathan Harris	The Sweetness of Water
2022	Jacinda Townsend	Mother Country
2023	Aaliyah Bilal	Temple Folk
2024	Essie Chambers	Swift River
2025	Rob Franklin	Great Black Hope

== Panel of judges ==
- Anthony Grooms
- Edward P. Jones
- Elizabeth Nunez
- Francine Prose
