= Jeffery Renard Allen =

American poet (born 1962)

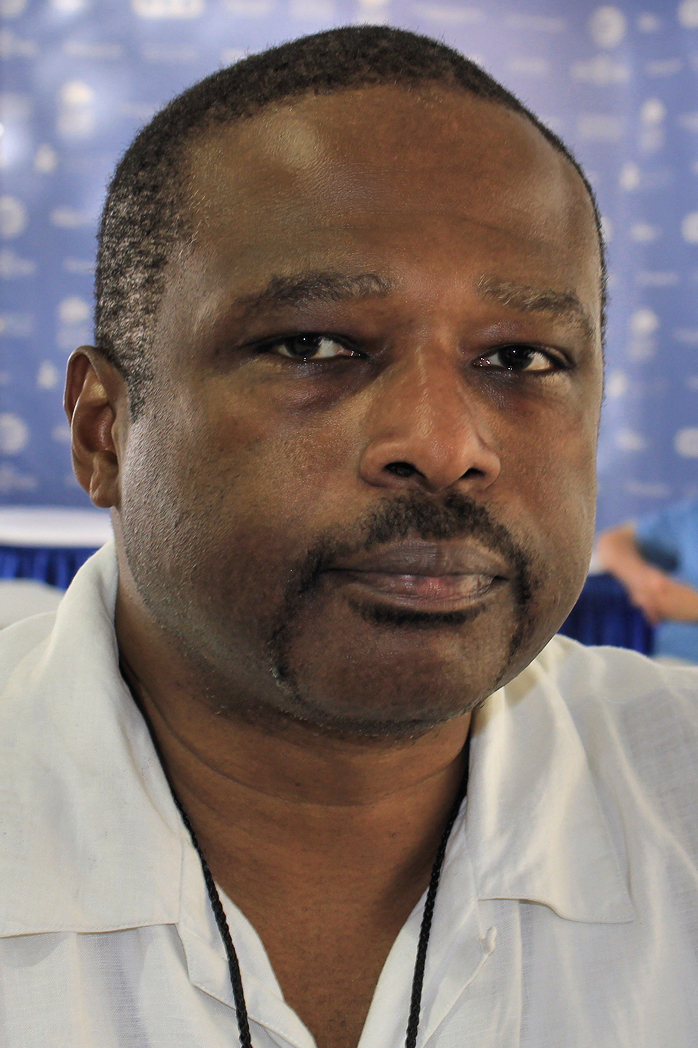
- Allen at the 2015 Texas Book Festival
- Born: 1962 (age 63–64); Chicago, Illinois, U.S.
- Education: University of Illinois Chicago (PhD)
- Occupations: Poet, author, essayist

Jeffery Renard Allen (born 1962) is an American poet, novelist, short story writer, and essayist. He is best known for his novels Rails Under My Back (2000) and Song of the Shank (2014), the latter of which was a finalist for the PEN/Faulkner Award for Fiction. Allen's work often explores African-American life and history through experimental language and innovative structure.

== Early life ==
Jeffery Renard Allen was born in 1962 in Chicago, and raised on the South Side of Chicago, a neighborhood that he says informs the setting of his first novel Rails Under My Back and the stories in his collection Holding Pattern. For Allen, the 1980s in Chicago and other black communities across America represented an "apocalyptic moment" with the introduction of crack cocaine, the violence and other forms of destruction and devastation it brought, experiences that he feels have been underrepresented in literary fiction.

Allen attended public schools in Chicago, then completed all of his university education at the University of Illinois at Chicago, where he holds a Ph.D. in English (Creative Writing).

== Career ==
Jeffery Renard Allen was Professor of English at Queens College, City University of New York and a faculty member in the writing program at The New School and in the low residency MFA writing program at Fairleigh Dickinson University.

He has taught in the writing program at Columbia University and in many writers’ conferences and programs around the world including: Cave Canem, the Summer Literary Seminars Program in St. Petersburg, Russia, the Kwani? LitFest in Kenya, the Zora Neale Hurston/Richard Wright Foundation, North Country Retreat for Writers of Color, Chimamanda Ngozi Adichie’s Farafina Trust Workshop in Lagos, the American Writers Festival in Singapore, and VONA. He is the fiction director for the Norman Mailer Center’s Writers Colony. He is the co-founder and president of the Pan African Literary Forum, an international, non-profit literary organization that aids to help writers on the African continent.

His essays, reviews, fiction, and poetry have appeared in numerous publications, including The Chicago Tribune, Poets & Writers, Triquarterly, Ploughshares, Bomb, Hambone, The Antioch Review, StoryQuarterly, African Voices, St. Petersburg Review, African American Review, Callaloo, Arkansas Review, Other Voices, Black Renaissance Noire, Writer's Digest, and XCP:Cross Cultural Poetics. His work has also appeared in several anthologies, including 110 Stories: New York Writes After September 11, Rainbow Darkness: An Anthology of African American Poetry, Chicago Noir, Homeground: Language for an American Landscape, and Best African American Fiction 2010.

He is presently at work on a collection of stories and novellas called Radar Country that in part uses his travels on the African continent to frame an exploration of subjects such as place, race, religion and faith, music and culture, identity, and family.

=== Africa ===
Allen has worked with developing writers around the African continent. In 2006, he taught for the Kwani? Literary festival in Nairobi, Kenya. With fellow author Arthur Flowers, he founded the Pan African Literary Forum, which held an international writers’ conference in Accra, Ghana, in July 2008 that featured more than one hundred participants. The following fall he became deathly ill with malaria (and resulting complications) he had contracted while in West Africa, and spent more than six weeks in the hospital. (Source: Minna Proctor in the introduction to the Spring 2009 issue of The Literary Review.) In August 2012, Allen taught for Chimamanda Ngozi Adichie's Farafina Trust Workshop in Lagos, Nigeria. That same year, he also served as the program director for literature for the Jahazi Literary and Jazz Festival in Zanzibar. In his work with the Norman Mailer Center's Writers Colony, he has worked with a number of emerging writers from the African continent, including A. Igoni Barrett, Yewande Omotoso, Samuel Kolawole, and Victor Ehikhmamenor.

Under the auspices of the Pan African Literary Forum, in 2012 Allen organized a national reading tour for South African Poet Laureate Keorapetse Kgositsile. The Pan African Literary Forum has also collaborated on readings and panel discussions at The New School and for the National Black Writers Conference at Medgar Evers College.

In the essay "Water Brought Us" published in Callaloo in 2007, Allen examines how his travels on the African continent were reshaping his thoughts about race, slavery, and place. In subsequent interviews, he has talked about how the time he spent on the Swahili islands of Lamu (off the Kenyan coast) and Zanzibar in East Africa helped shape his creation of the fictional island called Edgemere in his 2014 novel Song of the Shank.

== Awards ==
Allen was awarded The P.E.N. Discovery Prize in 1989. His novel Rails Under My Back won the Chicago Tribune’s Heartland Prize for Fiction. His story collection Holding Pattern won the Ernest J. Gaines Award for Literary Excellence. He has also been awarded a Whiting Award, a support grant in Innovative Literature from Creative Capital, the Chicago Public Library’s Twenty First Century Award, Recognition for Pioneering Achievements in Fiction from the African American Literature and Culture Association, the 2003 Charles Angoff Award for Fiction from The Literary Review, and special citations from the Society for Midlands Authors and the Zora Neale Hurston/Richard Wright Foundation. He received a Guggenheim Fellowship in fiction in 2015.

== Editing ==
Allen is an advisory editor for the journal Black Renaissance Noire, which is published under the auspices of New York University’s Institute of African American Affairs. He was the guest editor for the Spring 2014 issue of Kweli Literary Magazine, as well as the Winter 2009 issue of The Literary Review, which focused on emerging writers from the African continent. He was also the guest poetry editor for the Spring 2014 issue of Fifth Wednesday Journal, a special section honoring the work of blues poet Sterling Plumpp.

== Latest book ==
In June 2023, Graywolf Press published Allen's latest book, Fat Time and Other Stories.

== Co-writer ==
Allen is the co-author of the memoir "An Unspeakable Hope: Brutality, Forgiveness, and Building a Better Future for My Son" with Leon Ford. The book was published by Atria in June 2023.

== Works available online ==
- "Days", Memorious 2
- "Prophet in Lace", Memorious 2
- https://evergreenreview.com/read/urgently-visible-jeffery-renard-allen/
- https://granta.com/mother-wit/

== Books ==
- Harbors and Spirits (Moyer Bell, 1999), Asphodel, 1999. ISBN 978-1-55921-208-3
- Rails Under My Back: A Novel. Farrar, Straus, and Giroux. 2000. ISBN 978-0-374-24626-6.
- Stellar Places (Moyer Bell 2007) Asphodel Press, 2007. ISBN 978-1-55921-385-1
- Holding Pattern: Stories. Graywolf Press. 2008. ISBN 978-1-55597-509-8.
- Song of the Shank. Graywolf Press. 2014. ISBN 978-1555976804.
- Fat Time and Other Stories, Graywolf Press, 2023, ISBN 978-1-64445-239-4

=== Anthologies ===
- John G. Cawelti (ed.), Leon Forrest: Introductions and Interpretations, Popular Press, 1997.
- Tony Medina, Luis Reyes Riveria (eds), Bum Rush the Page: A Def Poetry Jam, Broadway Books, 2001.
- Keith Tuma (ed.), 110 Stories: New York Writes after September 11, New York University Press (September 11, 2002), ISBN 978-0-8147-9905-5
- Rainbow Darkness: An Anthology of African American Poetry, Miami University Press (February 28, 2006). ISBN 978-1-881163-47-3
- Barry Lopez, Debra Gwartney (eds), Homeground: Language for an American Landscape, Trinity University Press (October 2006). ISBN 978-1-59534-024-5
- Neil Pollack (ed.), Chicago Noir, Akshaic Books, 2005.
- E. Lynn Harris and Marita Golden (eds), Gumbo: An Anthology of African American Writing, Harlem Moon Broadway Books, 2002.
- Gerard Early and Randall Kennedy (eds), "Best African American 2010", One World/Ballantine, 2009.

== Sources ==
- Shelf Unbound
- "Interview with Robin Steinberg, The Steinberg Review"
- "Reimagining Blind Tom, Laura Pegram & Ivelisse Rodriguez Interview Jeffery Renard Allen", Kweli Literary Journal, June 29, 2011.
- "Walking Sebold’s Spider: Michael A Antonnuci talks with Jeffery Renard Allen", Other Voices #43.
- Reginal S. Young, "From ‘Black Kurt Vonnegut’ to Pan-African Bard: An Interview with Jeffery Renard Allen".
- "Interview with Ramola D."
- Kate Tuttle, "Jeffery Renard Allen detects alternate history of slave’s genius." The Boston Globe, June 14, 2014.
- Mitchell S. Jackson, "Command Performance", The New York Times Book Review, June 22, 2014.
- Bromely, Anne E. (February 22, 2016). "From Amsterdam to Zanzibar: New UVA Professor Jeffery Allen on Writing". UVA Today. Archived from the original on February 23, 2016.
