= Other Voices (journal) =

- Discipline: Cultural studies, literature
- Language: English

Publication details
- History: 1997–present
- Publisher: University of Pennsylvania (United States)

Standard abbreviations
- ISO 4: Other Voices

Indexing
- ISSN: 1094-2254

Links
- Journal homepage

Other Voices is a peer-reviewed open-access academic journal of cultural criticism and cultural studies founded in 1996 at the University of Pennsylvania. Other Voices publishes interdisciplinary essays, interviews, roundtable discussions, lecture transcriptions, audio and video lectures, multimedia projects, translations and reviews in the arts and humanities. It covers developments in literature, arts, and culture through various historical, critical, and theoretical methods. The journal is edited by Vance Bell and Joshua Schuster.

Other Voices is archived by Stanford University's LOCKSS project.
