= Aaliyah Bilal =

American author of fiction, including short stories

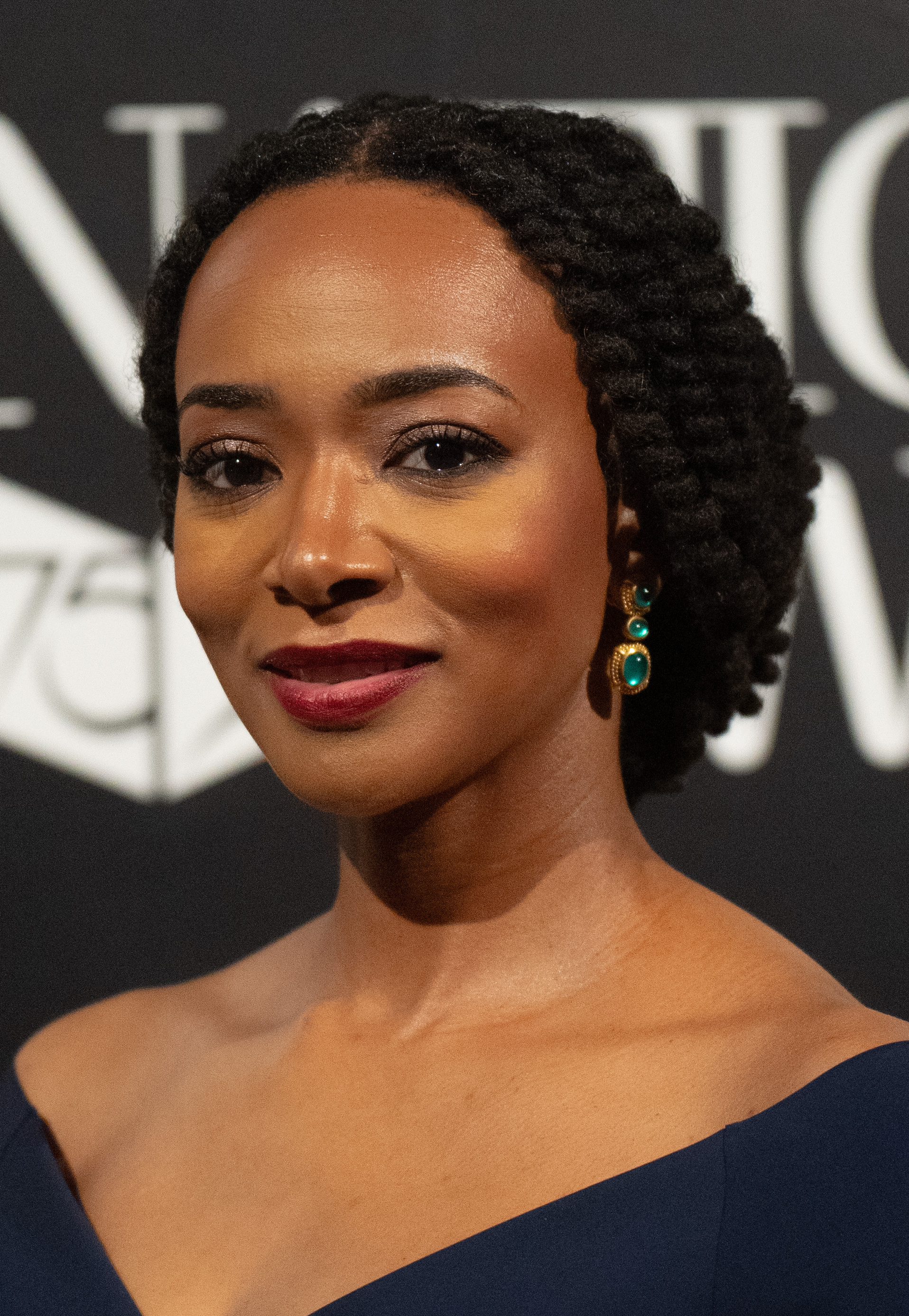
- Bilal in 2024
- Education: Oberlin College (BA); University of London (MA)
- Notable work: Temple Folk
- Awards: Whiting Award; Ernest J. Gaines Award for Literary Excellence

Aaliyah Bilal is an American writer. She is best known for her debut collection of short stories, Temple Folk, which tells of the lives of Black Muslims living in America in the 1970s, including their participation and interaction with The Nation of Islam. The book was a finalist for the 2023 National Book Award for Fiction and the 2024 Aspen Words Literary Prize. She also received the 2024 Whiting Award. In May 2024, it was announced the book received the 17th annual Ernest J. Gaines Award for Literary Excellence.

Bilal grew up in the suburbs of Washington, D.C. to a middle class Sunni Muslim family. She attended Oberlin College where she earned degrees in African American studies and Spanish, and the University of London where she earned a master's degree. Bilal has cited Toni Morrison, Gwendolyn Brooks, and Edward P. Jones as literary influences. Her previous writing has also appeared in the Chicago Quarterly Review and The Rumpus.
