= Ladee Hubbard =

American author (born 1970)

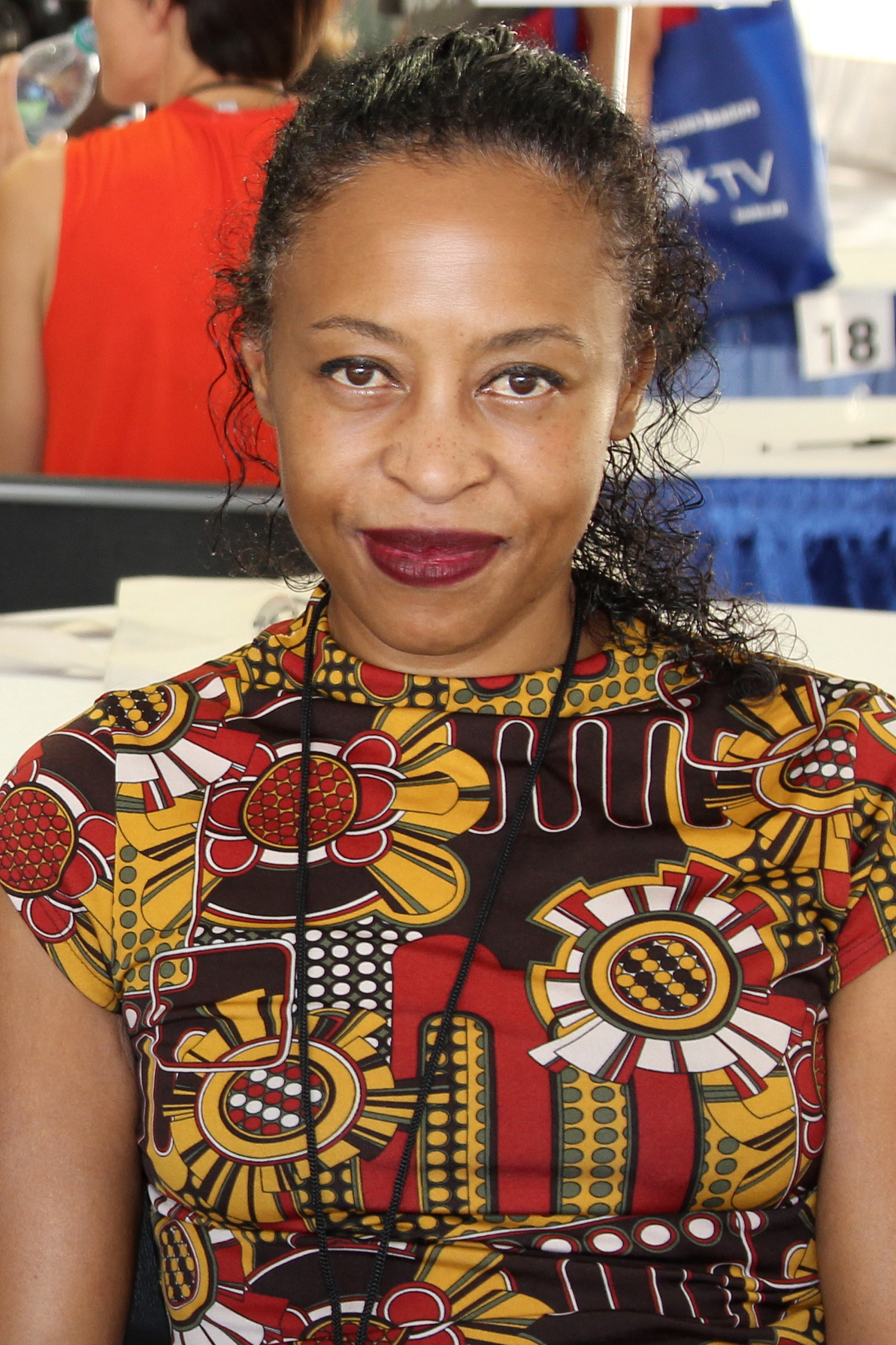
- Hubbard at the 2017 Texas Book Festival
- Born: March 27, 1970 (age 56); Cambridge, Massachusetts, U.S.
- Occupations: Novelist, short-story writer, professor
- Writing career
- Notable works: The Talented Ribkins (2017); The Rib King (2019)
- Notable awards: Rona Jaffe Foundation Writers’ Award (2016); Ernest J. Gaines Award for Literary Excellence (2018)
- Website: ladeehubbard.com

Ladee Hubbard (born 1970) is an American author and English professor at Tulane University. Her 2017 debut novel, The Talented Ribkins, won multiple awards. She released its prequel, The Rib King, in 2021. Hubbard has received a Berlin Prize and a Radcliffe Institute Fellowship.

== Early life ==
Hubbard was born in Cambridge, Massachusetts. Her mother found work as a lawyer on Saint Thomas, U.S. Virgin Islands, and Saint John, U.S. Virgin Islands, so she spent some of her childhood in the Virgin Islands, and spent summers in Florida with her grandparents. Hubbard has lived in New Orleans since 2003. She earned her bachelor's degree from Princeton University, and studied at the University of Wisconsin–Madison, where she received her Master of Fine Arts in creative writing. She has a PhD in Folklore and Mythology from the University of California, Los Angeles.

== Work ==
Hubbard began work on her first novel, The Talented Ribkins, while studying at the University of Wisconsin–Madison. The book won the Ernest J. Gaines Award for Literary Excellence and the Hurston/Wright Legacy Award for Debut Novel, and Hubbard herself won the Rona Jaffe Foundation Writers' Award. The central characters of the story each possess odd superpowers. Protagonist Johnny Ripkins is capable of drawing a map of any place regardless of whether he has any firsthand knowledge. Ripkins begins the novel on the run, and Hubbard has said that "debt and paying back what you owe" as motivating factors inspired her. The odd powers were influenced by W. E. B. Du Bois's idea of the talented tenth and common misinterpretations of the concept.

The Rib King, her second novel, is a revenge story set in the early 20th century in a fictional city based on Chicago, Illinois. It is a prequel to her debut novel. The first half follows the story of Mr. Sitwell, the Black groundskeeper for the White Barclay family. The Barclays sell bottled barbecue sauce with a cartoonish version of Sitwell—the "Rib King"—on the label. The book focuses on racism, inequality, the Black middle class, and unpunished violence.

Released in 2022, The Last Suspicious Holdout is a collection of short stories, all set in the 1990s to early 2000s in a mostly Black suburb. The stories were written over a period several years beginning when Barack Obama was elected as the United States' first Black president. Hubbard says the stories reflect her experience growing up in "the post-civil rights era" and "the resiliency and artistry" in the Black community. Critic Mike Peed noted how the stories chart personal and political traumas that are intertwined.

== Bibliography ==
=== Books ===
- The Talented Ribkins. Melville House. 2017. Excerpt.
- The Rib King. Amistad. 2021.
- The Last Suspicious Holdout. Amistad. 2022.

=== Selected publications ===
- "False Cognates (1991)". Guernica Magazine. March 2018.
- "Yams". Virginia Quarterly Review. Summer 2018. Archived from the original on July 20, 2018.
- "Camila Pitanga". Revista Pessoa. September 2020. Archived from the original on November 1, 2020.
- "Five People Who Crave Sauce". Oxford American Magazine. June 2021.
- "How The Sauce Is Made". Oxford American Magazine. July 2021.
