= T. Geronimo Johnson =

American novelist

T. Geronimo Johnson is an American filmmaker and novelist. His debut novel, Hold It 'Til It Hurts, was a finalist for the 2013 PEN/Faulkner Award for Fiction. His sophomore novel, Welcome to Braggsville, won the 2015 Ernest J. Gaines Award for Literary Excellence, the 2016 William Saroyan International Prize for Fiction Writing, and the inaugural Simpson Family Literary Prize in 2017.

== Early life and education ==
Johnson was born and raised in New Orleans.

Johnson received a Bachelor of Arts in philosophy and religious studies from Oglethorpe University; a Master of Arts in language, literacy, and culture from the University of California, Berkeley; and a Master of Fine Arts in fiction from the Iowa Writers' Workshop. He was also a Stegner Fellow at Stanford University. Between 2017–2018, Johnson was a Rome Prize Fellow.

He later completed PhD coursework in language, literacy, and culture at the University of California, Berkeley.

== Career ==
Johnson has taught writing at multiple universities, including the University of California, Berkeley; Stanford University; Oregon State University; and Texas State University; among others.

In 2007, Johnson's short story "Winter Never Quits" was included in Harvest Books' Best New American Voices 2007.

=== First novel ===
Johnson's debut novel, Hold It 'Til It Hurts, was published by Coffee House Press in 2012. The novel was a finalist for the 2013 PEN/Faulkner Award for Fiction.

=== Second novel ===
Johnson's second novel, Welcome to Braggsville, was published by William Morrow and Company in 2015. The novel won the 2015 Ernest J. Gaines Award for Literary Excellence, 2016 William Saroyan International Prize for Fiction Writing, and 2017 Simpson Family Literary Prize. It was also a runner-up for the Mark Twain American Voice in Literature Award, longlisted for the 2015 National Book Award for Fiction and 2016 Andrew Carnegie Medals for Excellence in Fiction, and nominated for the 2016 Hurston/Wright Legacy Award. NPR and Time also included it on their list of the best books of 2015.

In 2016, after his nomination the previous year, Johnson was named a judge for the National Book Award for Fiction.

== Awards and honors ==
NPR and Time included Welcome to Braggsville on their lists of the best books of 2015.

Year	Title	Award	Category	Result	Ref.
2013	Hold It 'Til It Hurts	PEN/Faulkner Award for Fiction	—	Finalist	
2015	Welcome to Braggsville	Ernest J. Gaines Award for Literary Excellence	—	Won	
2015	Welcome to Braggsville	National Book Award	Fiction	Longlisted	
2016	Welcome to Braggsville	Andrew Carnegie Medals for Excellence	Fiction	Longlisted	
2016	Welcome to Braggsville	Hurston/Wright Legacy Award	General Fiction	Nominated	
2016	Welcome to Braggsville	Mark Twain American Voice in Literature Award	—	Runner-Up	
2016	Welcome to Braggsville	William Saroyan International Prize for Writing	Fiction	Won	
2017	Welcome to Braggsville	Simpson Family Literary Prize	—	Won	

== Publications ==
=== Novels ===
- —— (2012). Hold It 'Til It Hurts. Coffee House Press. ISBN 9781566893091.
- —— (2015). Welcome to Braggsville (1st ed.). William Morrow and Co. ISBN 9780062302120.
- The Occidental Book of the Dead. HarperCollins. 2026. ISBN 9780063330580.

=== Short stories ===
- Miller, Sue, ed. (2007). "Winter Never Quits". Best New American Voices 2007. Harvest Books. ISBN 9780156031554.
