= Jamel Brinkley =

American writer

- Education: Columbia University (BA); University of Iowa (MFA)
- Occupation: Writer
- Writing career
- Notable awards: Ernest J. Gaines Award for Literary Excellence (2019); PEN Oakland Josephine Miles Award (2019)

Jamel Brinkley is an American writer. His debut story collection, A Lucky Man (2018), was the winner of the PEN Oakland Josephine Miles Award and the Ernest J. Gaines Award for Literary Excellence. It was also a finalist for the National Book Award, The Story Prize, the John Leonard Award, the Hurston/Wright Legacy Award, and the PEN/Robert W. Bingham Prize. He currently teaches fiction at the Iowa Writers' Workshop.

== Biography ==
Jamel Brinkley was raised in Brooklyn and the Bronx, New York City. He graduated from Columbia University and the Iowa Writers' Workshop, where he teaches.

His first book, A Lucky Man, is set in New York City and explores themes of family relationships, love, loss, complex identity, and masculinity. NPR said of the collection, "[It] may include only nine stories, but in each of them, Brinkley gives us an entire world."

His second book, Witness, won the Maya Angelou Book Award in 2024.

Brinkley is an alumnus of the Callaloo Creative Writing Workshop and was also a Kimbilio Fellow in Fiction. He graduated with an MFA in creative writing from the Iowa Writers' Workshop. He was the 2016–2017 Carol Houck Smith Fiction Fellow at the Wisconsin Institute for Creative Writing and a 2018–2020 Wallace Stegner Fellow in Fiction at Stanford University.

== Awards ==
Awards for Brinkley's writing
| Year | Title | Award | Cateogory | Result | Ref. |
|---|---|---|---|---|---|
| 2018 | A Lucky Man | National Book Award | Fiction | Finalist | |
| 2018 | A Lucky Man | National Book Critics Circle Award | John Leonard Prize | Finalist | |
| 2018 | A Lucky Man | The Story Prize | — | Finalist | |
| 2019 | A Lucky Man | Aspen Words Literary Prize | — | Longlisted | |
| 2019 | A Lucky Man | Ernest J. Gaines Award for Literary Excellence | — | Won | |
| 2019 | A Lucky Man | Hurston/Wright Legacy Award | Début Fiction | Finalist | |
| 2019 | A Lucky Man | PEN Oakland Josephine Miles Award | — | Won | |
| 2019 | A Lucky Man | PEN/Robert W. Bingham Prize | — | Finalist | |
| 2024 | Witness | Aspen Words Literary Prize | — | Shortlisted | |
| 2024 | Witness | PEN/Faulkner Award for Fiction | — | Finalist | |

== Publications ==
- A Lucky Man. Graywolf Press. 2018. ISBN 9781555978051.
- Witness: Stories. Farrar, Straus and Giroux. 2023. ISBN 9780374607036.
