= Olympia Vernon =

American author (born 1973)

- Born: May 22, 1973 (age 53); Bogalusa, Louisiana, U.S.
- Education: Southeastern Louisiana University (BA); Louisiana State University (MFA)
- Occupation: Novelist

Olympia Vernon (born May 22, 1973) is an American author who has published three novels: Eden (2002), Logic (2004), and A Killing In This Town (2006). Eden won the 2004 Richard and Hinda Rosenthal Foundation Award from The American Academy of Arts and Letters.

== Biography ==
Vernon was born in Bogalusa, Louisiana, and grew up in Mount Hermon, Louisiana, and Osyka, Mississippi. The family had seven children. Her father, Fletcher Williams, Jr., graduated from the University of Mississippi. Vernon attended South Pike High School in Magnolia, Mississippi. She received a Bachelor of Arts degree in criminal justice from Southeastern Louisiana University (SLU) in 1999. She also earned a Master of Fine Arts degree in Creative Writing from Louisiana State University in 2002. She was appointed writer-in-residence at SLU in 2004.

She wrote her first novel, Eden, while in graduate school. In 2005 she received the Louisiana Governor's Award for Professional Artist of the Year. In 2007-08 Vernon was the Hallie Ford Chair in Writing at Willamette University. In 2007, she won the Ernest J. Gaines Award for Literary Excellence for A Killing In This Town.

== Bibliography ==
- Eden (2002)
- Logic (2004)
- A Killing In This Town (2006)
