= Mitchell S. Jackson =

American writer

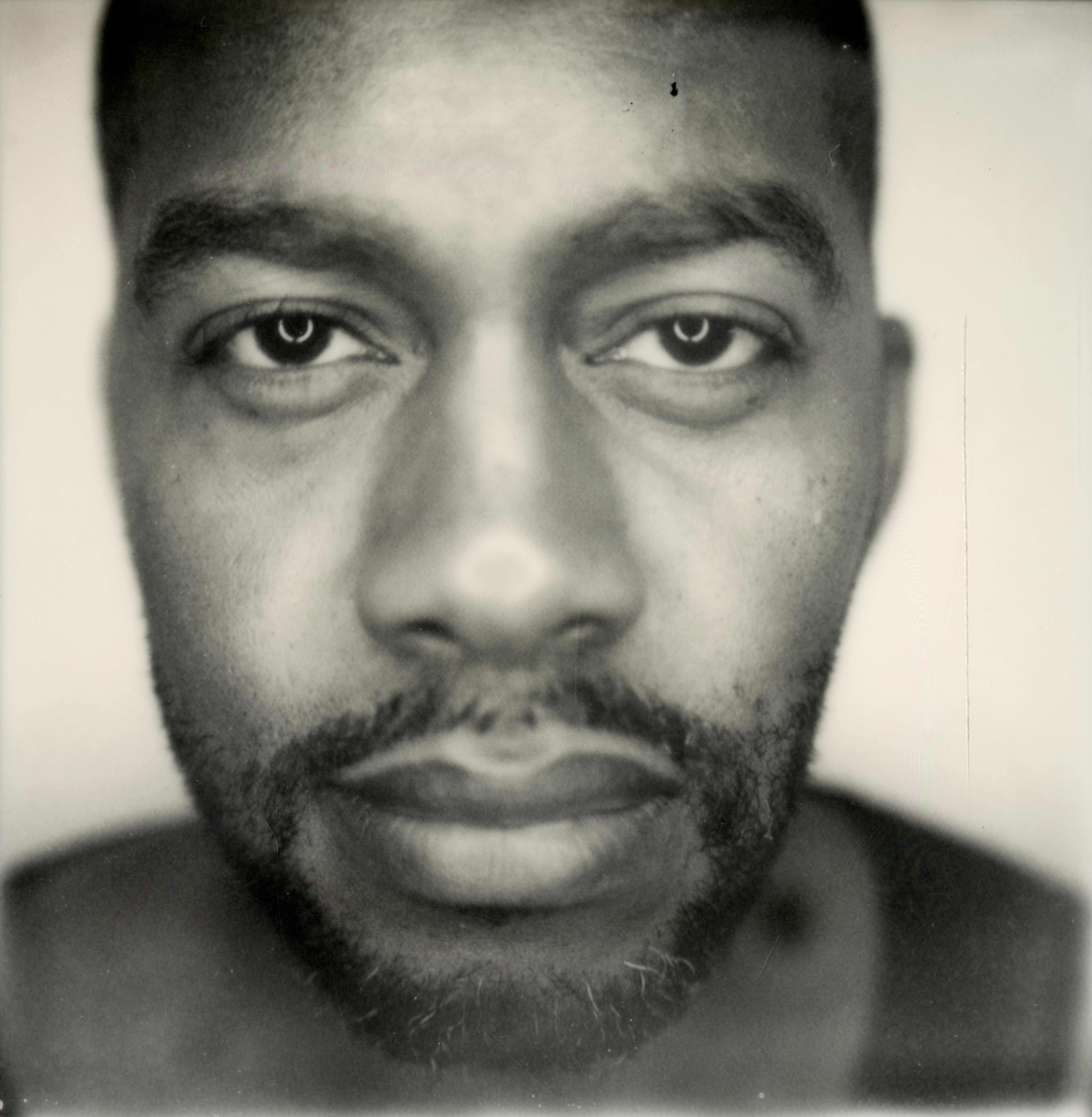
- Author photo, 2016
- Born: Portland, Oregon, U.S.
- Education: Portland State University (MA); New York University (MFA)
- Occupations: Author; Academic
- Awards: Lannan Foundation Fellowship; TED Fellowship; Ernest J. Gaines Award for Literary Excellence; Whiting Award; Guggenheim Fellowship; Pulitzer Prize for Feature Writing

Mitchell S. Jackson is an American writer. He is the author of the 2013 novel The Residue Years, as well as Oversoul (2012), an ebook collection of essays and short stories. Jackson is a Whiting Award recipient and a former winner of the Ernest J. Gaines Award for Literary Excellence. In 2021, while an assistant professor of creative writing at the University of Chicago, he won the Pulitzer Prize and the National Magazine Award for Feature Writing for his profile of Ahmaud Arbery for Runner's World. As of 2021, Jackson is the John O. Whiteman Dean's Distinguished Professor in the Department of English at Arizona State University.

He has also been the recipient of fellowships from TED and the Lannan Foundation. Jackson is also a public speaker and documentarian.

== Biography ==
Jackson was born in Portland, Oregon. He was raised by a single mother. In his youth, he was arrested on drug charges and sent to prison, where he took an interest in literature and began experimenting with autobiographical writing.

Following his release in the summer of 1998, Jackson received a Master of Arts in writing from Portland State University, as well as a Master of Fine Arts in Creative Writing from New York University.

Jackson is a father of two.

== Career ==
In 2012, Jackson published Oversoul: Stories & Essays, an ebook compilation of short fiction and non-fiction. His debut novel, The Residue Years, was released in the summer of 2013 and was praised by publications such as The New York Times, The Paris Review, and The Sydney Morning Herald. Jackson is a Whiting Award recipient. The Residue Years also won The Ernest Gaines Award for Literary Excellence and was short-listed for the Center For Fiction's Flaherty-Dunnan First novel prize, the PEN/ Hemingway award for first fiction, The Hurston/Wright Legacy Award for best fiction by a writer of African descent; it was short-listed for the William Saroyan International Prize for writing, and named an "Honor Book" by the BCALA. He has been the recipient of fellowships from TED, the Lannan Foundation, The Center For Fiction, and The Bread Loaf Writer's Conference.

Jackson is the co-director, writer, and producer of The Residue Years: A Documentary (2013), a documentary film exploring the autobiographical elements of his novel of the same name. It was an Official Selection of the Portland Film Festival. It premiered on the Web at the Literary Hub website.

Jackson's short fiction, nonfiction, and poetry have been published in Vice, Esquire, Gigantic Magazine, Flaunt Magazine, The Frozen Moment: Contemporary Writers on the Choices That Change Our Lives, and New York Tyrant, among other publications. He was the first Black columnist for Esquire.

Jackson is a former TED speaker. He has also read and/or and lectured at institutions including Brown University, Middlebury College, and UMASS; at events including The Brooklyn Book Festival, and the Sydney Writers' Festival; at various adult prisons and youth facilities; and for organizations including The Pathfinders of Oregon, The PEN/Faulkner Foundation, and The Volunteers of America. He has served on the faculty of New York University, Columbia University, and the University of Chicago. He is currently on the faculty at Arizona State University.

Jackson published Survival Math: Notes on an All American Family in 2019. It was selected for Time's 100 Must-Read Books of 2019, NPR's Books We Love 2019, and Buzzfeed's Best Books of 2019.

== Works ==
=== Books ===
==== Fiction ====
- —— (2013). The Residue Years. Bloomsbury USA. ISBN 9781620400289.

==== Collections ====
- Oversoul: Stories & Essays. The Collections House. 2012.

=== Short fiction and poetry ===
- "Sixty, Seventy, Eighty." Gigantic Magazine. 2013.
- "Oversoul." Vice – Fiction Issue. June 2012.
- "An Exquisite Corpse." Gigantic Magazine. October 10, 2011.
- "Presidents: An Epic" The Frozen Moment: Contemporary Writers on the Choices That Change Our Lives. 2011.
- "Head Down, Palm Up." New York Tyrant. Fall 2011.
- "Luminous Days: a novel excerpt." Tusculum College Literary Journal Vol 1. 2005.
- "Post Script." Intimacy: Erotic Stories of Love, Lust, and Marriage by Black Men. 2004.
- "Late Night". Sou’ Western Literary Journal. 2003.
- "Luminous Days." Gumbo: An Anthology of African American Writing. 2002.

=== Nonfiction ===
- "Portrait of a Lifeguard." Dossier Journal. 2008.
- "Interview With Emory Douglas." Dossier Journal. 2008.
- "True to the Selves." aboutaword.com. June 29, 2012.
- "No Blood Left Behind." Everyday Genius. November 15, 2012.
- "My First Time." Davidabramsbooks.blogspot.com. August 26, 2013.
- "The Name Game." Bookpage. September 2013.
- "Growing Up Black in the Whitest City in America." Salon. March 17, 2014.
- "How to Catch A Racist: The Donald Sterling Edition." Guernica Mag. May 6, 2014.
- "Dear Gordon." Tin House Magazine. Spring 2015.
- Survival Math: Notes on an All-American Family. Scribner, 2019.
- Twelve Minutes and a Life. Runner's World, 2020.
- He Was My Role Model. My Mentor. My Supplier. New York Times Magazine, December 20, 2023.

=== Film ===
- The Residue Years: A Documentary. 2013.

== Honors ==
- 2004: Hurston Wright Foundation, Award For College Writers (Fiction)
- 2008: Urban Artist Initiative, NYC Fellowship
- 2011: Center For Fiction, Emerging Writers Fellowship
- 2013: New York Times Book Review, Editor's Choice
- 2013: Center For Fiction, Flaherty-Dunnan First Novel Prize, Finalist
- 2013: American Book Sellers Association, Debut Dozen
- 2014: Sydney Morning Herald, Pick of the Week
- 2014: The New York Times Book Review, Paperback Row
- 2014: Ernest J. Gaines Award for Literary Excellence, Winner
- 2014: Lannan Literary Fellowship, Fiction
- 2014: PEN / Hemingway Debut Fiction Award, Finalist
- 2014: Hurston Wright Legacy Award, Finalist
- 2014: Saroyan International Prize For Writing, Shortlist
- 2014: Black Caucus of the American Library Association, Honor Book
- 2015: Portland Community College, Diamond Alumni Award
- 2015: Everybody Reads Selection, Multnomah County Library, Oregon
- 2016: Whiting Writers’ Award, Winner
- 2016: TED, Fellowship
- 2021: National Magazine Award, Feature Writing
- 2021: Pulitzer Prize, Feature Writing
