= Jones Lectureship =

The Jones Lectureship at Stanford University is a four-year teaching fellowship available to previous Stegner Fellows. The Lectureship is available in fiction and poetry and is intended to provide writers with the time and support needed to complete book-length literary projects. Jones Lecturers typically teach several undergraduate courses per year. The Lectureship is named for Richard Foster Jones, head of the Stanford English Department when Wallace Stegner founded Stanford's Creative Writing Program following the end of Second World War. The original $500,000 endowment for the Lectureship came from Dr. E. H. Jones, a Texas oilman and brother of Richard Foster Jones.

Other appointments available to former Stegner Fellows include the Marsh McCall Lectureship and the Draper Lectureship, each two-year appointments at Stanford University. The Marsh McCall Lecturer oversees the staffing and teaching of creative writing courses at Stanford Continuing Studies. It is named for Classics Professor Marsh McCall, former dean of Continuing Studies. Former Marsh McCall Lecturers include Julie Orringer, Stephen Elliott, Eric Puchner, and Adam Johnson. The Draper Lecturer primarily teaches undergraduate courses in creative non-fiction. It is named for Phyllis Draper and William Henry Draper III.

== List of notable Jones Lecturers ==
- Tobias Wolff
- Keith Scribner
- Bruce Snider
- Lysley Tenorio
- Richie Hofmann
- Hieu Minh Nguyen
- Allan Gurganus
- Scott Turow
- Rick Barot
- Kai Carlson-Wee
- Timothy Steele
- Al Young
- Gabrielle Calvocoressi
- Tom Kealey
- Adam Johnson
- ZZ Packer
- Tom Barbash
- Ryan Harty
- Scott Hutchins
- Nan Cohen
- Peter Campion
- Daniel Orozco
- Dana Kletter
- David Vann
- Ed McClanahan
- Ehud Havazelet
- Skip Horack
- Solmaz Sharif
- Maria Hummel
- Greg Wrenn
