= Daniel Orozco =

American writer of fiction

Daniel Orozco is an American writer of fiction known primarily for his short stories. His works have appeared in anthologies such as The Best American Short Stories and The Pushcart Prize Anthology and magazines such as Harper's and Zoetrope. He is a former Stegner Fellow and Jones Lecturer of Stanford University and currently teaches creative writing at the University of Idaho. He won a 2011 Whiting Award.

Orozco's best-known short story is "Orientation", which originally appeared in The Seattle Review and has subsequently been included in The Best American Short Stories 1995, and presented in audio form on National Public Radio. Orientation: And Other Stories, a collection of Orozco's work, was published by Faber & Faber in May 2011.

== Early life and education ==
Orozco was born in 1957 in Daly City, California, the son of Nicaraguan immigrants. He was raised in the San Francisco Bay Area up until his 30s, during which time he attended Stanford University, afterward working as an office assistant. In 1992, he attended the University of Washington in Seattle for an MFA program, which he completed in 1994.

== Works ==
- "I Run Every Day". Zoetrope: All-Story. 5 (3). AZX Publications. Fall 2001.

=== Books ===
- Orientation: And Other Stories. Faber & Faber. 2011. ISBN 978-0-86547-871-8. "orientation and other stories."
