= Fortune Smiles =

2015 short story collection by Adam Johnson

- Hardcover edition
- Author: Adam Johnson
- Language: English
- Genre: Short stories
- Publisher: Random House
- Publication date: 2015
- Publication place: United States
- Media type: Print (Paperback)
- Pages: 320 pages
- ISBN: 978-1410486073

Fortune Smiles is a 2015 collection of short stories by American author and novelist Adam Johnson. It is Johnson's second published short story collection, after his 2002 book Emporium and his first book after winning the Pulitzer Prize for The Orphan Master's Son. The collection includes six stories, several of which have won awards.

== Contents ==
Story	Originally published in
"Nirvana"	Esquire
"Hurricanes Anonymous"	Tin House
"Interesting Facts"	Harper's Magazine
"George Orwell Was a Friend of Mine"	21st Editions
"Dark Meadow"	Tin House
"Fortune Smiles"	Tin House

== Synopsis ==
=== "Nirvana" ===
An unnamed narrator in the near future lives with his paraplegic wife Charlotte in Palo Alto. After the recent assassination of the President of the United States, the narrator creates a digital simulacrum of him and releases it on the internet, which mitigates the national mourning. Additionally, an iProjector reanimates his body and voice, which the narrator uses to discuss his life complications. Among them is how to cope with his wife's condition; while it is possible to make a full recovery, his wife seems like a lost cause as she has not shown signs of improvement. He tries his best to console her, but most of her days are spent listening to Nirvana and smoking pot.

After work one day, his boss SJ, short for Sanjay, visits him at his house. SJ wants to privatize the digital simulacrum of the president. The narrator refuses, but repairs a small drone while they talk. They learn that Google sent a drone after him in an effort to learn more about him. That night, he learns that Charlotte wants to have a baby. That night, alone, he consults the reanimated president for advice, but to not much avail. After a clumsy act of intercourse where he is unsure of what he is doing and Charlotte cries halfway through, he stops, puts on headphones playing Nirvana on Charlotte's ears, and retreats to his garage. He works through the night and creates a simulacrum of Kurt Cobain and presents it to Charlotte. Convinced that Cobain's imitation is real, Charlotte urges him to "don't do what you're thinking about" as the narrator looks on and realize that she would embrace the deceased singer at a moments notice if she could.

=== "Hurricanes Anonymous" ===
A few weeks after Hurricane Katrina, Randall “Nonc” Richard, a UPS truck driver, searches Lake Charles for Marnie, the mother of his two-and-a-half-year-old son, Geronimo. He is assisted by girlfriend Relle, who is just as eager to find the boy's mother. He also has to worry about his terminally ill father Harlan living in Los Angeles, who sends him a package.

At an Alcoholics Anonymous meeting Nonc and Relle attend to receive free child care services for two hours, she reveals her undying love for him, which he rebuffs due to Geronimo's situation. While they are having sex in his truck during the break, she mentions how he secured enough money to buy a hunting lodge. After the meeting ends, he drops her off at the halfway house where she works and has a brief conversation with Dr. Gaby, who runs the complex, about Geronimo. That night, he receives a call from his father, who leaves a message via a nurse due to the loss of his voice. Regardless, he asks the nurse to give the receiver to his father so that Geronimo can speak to his grandfather.

The next morning, while making a delivery to the Calcasieu Parish jail, Nonc asks to see Marnie, who he reckons could be imprisoned there. Under the guise of being her brother, they meet. She explains that she was a victim of being in the wrong place at the wrong time; her boyfriend Allen was the real offender. Before he leaves the jail, he lets Marnie and Geronimo embrace once more.

After coming to the realization that he will have custody of Geronimo for a while, he calls Relle to confirm if she is serious about the lodge; she responds that she is. He then calls his father and thanks him for the package which includes loaded online poker accounts and the keys to several four by fours. The next day, he asks Dr. Gaby to assume guardianship of Geronimo so that he and Relle can go to California to pick up his father's car. Reluctant at first, she eventually agrees, knowing that Nonc will keep his word and return. As they cross Lake Charles Bridge heading west, Relle tells him to “relax.”

=== "Interesting Facts" ===
A terminally ill wife, the narrator of the story, and her husband return to their Haight home after a bookstore reading. Because the reading regarded a male widow who waits more than a year before dating again, the narrator asks her husband how long he would wait. He responds by avoiding the question. They also have three children; the youngest reiterates interesting facts, a habit the narrator picks up.

Before the narrator dies, she introduced her husband to Megumi, a single mother whose child goes to the same school as her children. When the narrator dies, she becomes a ghost and oversees her husband's transition. She grows jealous of him because he is a successful writer who borrowed some of her ideas as well as how close he is with Megumi so soon after her death. Ultimately, he lies by their children as she looks on, taking keen notice of their youngest child.

=== "George Orwell Was a Friend of Mine" ===
Hans receives packages of personal items that date back to his time when he was the warden of Hohenschönhausen Prison, before reunification. Decades later, he still lives a block from the prison, regularly walking his dog Prinz around the neighborhood. One day, he overhears a tour guide telling about how Klaus Wexler, a famous playwright, was tortured in Hohenschönhausen. Hans vehemently challenges the guide, asserting that such an atrocity never occurred during his time as warden. Days later, because a tourist had filmed him and uploaded the clip to YouTube, he receives another package of memorabilia.

A few days later, the curator of the tours asks Hans discuss with him the video while surveying the old prison together, to which he agrees. The curator states that history would be enriched if he led a guided tour telling of the prison from his perspective; the video of him doing so would be a public record. While discussing an endeavor, they come across his office which has been refurbished to the authentic condition of decades ago. He notices that much is the same, except that once-hidden surveillance microphones in his office that he did not know about are now uncovered for all to see. He also notices a picture of him and his former wife Brigitte, which he tries to take but the curator asserts that the picture now belongs to the state.

Former colleague and Stasi officer Grünwald visits him shortly afterwards, informing him that the curator is in this for the money. The following day, the curator indefinitely "loans" him the picture he wanted yesterday. That night, he also receives a surprise visit from his daughter Nina, although she does not enter his place. She quickly confirms his suspicion that she and his wife are forwarding him the packages and she gives him another one before leaving. He opens up this package; inside are a pair of calf-skin gloves and an aesthetically elegant but confiscated pen from the prison, which he gave to his daughter many years ago as a gift. He decides shortly after that he will give a tour, but stresses that it will be on his own terms.

He confronts a tour group the next day and asks to be their guide. Berta, the regular guide, says that he may join the group and offer his opinion but she will still accompany them. Like most guides, Berta is a former inmate that tells of the atrocities done to her during her imprisonment. When they reach her cell, she talks of how she was tortured. Not only does Hans deny that such things happen, he states that the size of her cell was a luxury. When he enters the cell to prove his point, Berta closes the door. When he demands to be let out, she says that she does not have the key. Because he received all the key in one of his packages, he slips her the keys from under the door and does not panic; he instead thinks of a time he was on a picnic with his family. Shortly afterwards, the door opens.

They then make their way to the infirmary; here, Berta states that patients were subjected to radiation poisoning, to which Hans also denies. Hans also asserts that the head doctor was a benevolent man, treating his daughter when she was ill. Hans begins to walk off, but before he can leave, Berta reminds him that they still have to tour the "U-boats," or confinement units where inmates were exposed to extremely hot or cold water. Outraged that such chambers were torturous, he strips himself and enters the chambers, closes the door, and ask for the water from the valve to be released on him; Berta does so after cautioning him many times. While inside, Hans remembers who Berta was in the prison; he had confiscated a valuable ring from her and gave it to his friends's daughter. As he becomes aware of his ignorance, he reminisces about the rains that fell on East Germany many years ago.

The title of the story comes from Brigitte's observation that she is "friends" with George Orwell after she read Nineteen Eighty-Four, a book that had been thrown over the Berlin Wall and brought home by Hans. The Orwell novel also appears on his office desk's "lost and found."

=== "Dark Meadow" ===
A man, referred to as Mr. Roses, lives in a bungalow North Hollywood publishes a paper titled "Is Your Pornography Watching You?" online under the pseudonym Dark Meadow. Across the street he notices two young girls whose parents are often absent from their household, which he nicknames the Tiger and the Cub. He also admits that of the two, Cub "activates" him.

One day he is called for an IT repair job in Van Nuys. Mr. Roses notices that this man possesses child pornography on his computer. He sympathetically completes the job and refers the paper that Dark Meadow wrote to the man as a warning. A few days later, Officer Jaime Hernandez from the Crimes Against Minor task force visits him, requesting his assistance as Hernandez settles into his new position. Hernandez asks if he thinks Dark Meadow is trying to warn pornographers and Mr. Roses responds nonchalantly. Hernandez also asks him about his time as a Sea Scout when he was young, to which he responds that it was a short-lived time in his early life.

The following day, the Tiger and the Cub have a yard sale, to which Mr. Roses buys a painting from them. Later that day, they visit him and report to him that someone is peeping at them. After some investigation, he finds semen by one of the house's window. He instructs them to lock the doors to their house that night. The next day, he travels to Sun Valley to clean the computers of pornographers who saw the recent article by Dark Meadow. While he is cleaning the servers, he catches a glimpse of one of their screens. When the leader of the group asks him if he wants "some," the girl from the video walks out in a bathrobe. Mr. Roses flees from the scene, heads home, destroys his computer's RAM, and drives around for the rest of the day, revisiting a few places he went as a Sea Scout.

When he arrives home that night, the Tiger and the Cub are waiting for him and says that the peeper still lurks. He tells them to stay at his place. Later that night, they lie together on the same sofa-bed. He reveals to them that "Something bad happened to me" when he was young, referring to his time as a Sea Scout when he was abused. After they start lulling, he sees the opportunity to slip away into his backyard and masturbate.

=== "Fortune Smiles" ===
DJ, short for Dongjoo, and Sun-ho are recent North Korean defectors living in Seoul and they meet often at fast food restaurants to discuss their transition into South Korean life. Both are nostalgia for their old homes; DJ admits that his life was not as miserable as the media makes it out to be because he had an education while Sun-ho is unable to stop thinking about his muse in Pyongyang named Willow. To ease his lovelorn heart, they take a trip to the DMZ and Sun-ho release balloons with a Whopper meal attached, hoping it will reach her. They also often examine and discuss lottery tickets, especially the high-quality Fortune Smiles tickets.

Both have to attend mandatory meetings so that the government can access their assimilation. For DJ, he encounters Mina, a defector who plays North Korean songs with her accordion in public, at a Christian-sponsored meeting in Gwanak; she says she does this because she is looking for her husband. When DJ introduces her to Sun-ho, they talk and eventually reveal why they had to leave: a friend warned them that they may be blamed for a sickness spreading in Pyongyang due to their background in production. Subsequently, they drive to the border and defect without much hardship as they often have to deliver monthly goods into China anyway.

When they decide to float more objects past the DMZ, they run into Seo, a similarly minded defector; he wants to drop pamphlets titled "Kim Jong-un Is a War Criminal." Sun-ho argues that such propaganda is useless and he would rather float a jacket and other provisions. When it seems as if Sun-ho has won the argument, Seo points out that his balloons have "Happy Birthday" written on them and that he is honoring Kim Jong-il as his birthday is in three days.

Sun-ho finally invites DJ and Mina to come to his defector meeting in Gangnam. However, it turns out that Sun-ho does not attend such meetings and instead takes them to the top of tallest building in the district. He reveals his hopeful plan to float back into North Korea and reunite with Willow with the help of a belt attached to hundreds of balloons. When he is out of sight, DJ and Mina muse together at the Seoul skyline.

== Critical reception ==
Reception for the collection has been mostly positive. Lauren Groff, writing for The New York Times, states that the book "is a collection worthy of being read slowly and, like very good and very bitter chocolate, savored." Michael Schaub, writing for NPR, states the collection is "brilliant" and that "great literature isn't about making the reader comfortable; it's about coming to terms with the truth, whether it's beautiful or ugly." Don Waters, writing for SFGate, states that the book is "audacious" and "These six long, fearless stories explore dangerous territories" Connie Ogle, writing for the Miami Herald, states that the stories are "distinct and unique, each a perfect marvel of subtlety and precision, each devastating in its own way."

Ted Weesner Jr., writing for The Boston Globe, offers that "Fortune Smiles" and "Hurricanes Anonymous" "would be fine examples of solid stories in most any other collection, but here they exert less power. This stems, it would seem, from the fact that both are written in the third person and in situations where the author feels more alive than the characters."

== Awards and honors ==
- 2015 National Book Award for Fiction
- 2015 The Story Prize
- 2014 Sunday Times Short Story Award (for "Nirvana")
