= Peter Campion =

Peter Campion may refer to:

- Peter Campion (poet)
- Peter Campion (actor)
- Pete Campion (born 1979), American football player
