= Gabrielle Calvocoressi =

American poet, editor, essayist, and professor

- Calvocoressi at the 2025 National Book Awards Finalist Reading
- Born: 1974 (age 51–52); Central Connecticut, U.S.
- Education: Sarah Lawrence College; Columbia University (MFA)
- Occupations: Poet, professor
- Partner: Angeline Shaka
- Writing career
- Language: English
- Genre: Poetry
- Subjects: Small-town America, gender, sexuality, faith, history, mental health, the body
- Notable works: Rocket Fantastic; The New Economy
- Notable awards: Audre Lorde Award for Lesbian Poetry (2018); National Book Award for Poetry finalist (2025)

Gabrielle Calvocoressi is an American poet, editor, essayist, and professor. Their poetry collection The New Economy (Copper Canyon Press, 2025) was a finalist for the National Book Award for Poetry.

== Life and career ==
Gabrielle Calvocoressi was born in 1974 in central Connecticut. Their family owned movie theaters, including a drive-in, in several small towns across the state. Calvocoressi, who is a nonbinary lesbian, has used their writing to reflect on their mother's mental illness and suicide; their work also explores small town America, history, sexuality, faith, violence, gender, and the body.

They studied at Sarah Lawrence College and earned an MFA from Columbia University.

They have been a visiting professor of poetry at UCLA, Bennington College, and UC-Irvine, and held a Stegner Fellowship and a Jones Lectureship at Stanford University. They also taught in the MFA program at California College of the Arts.

Calvocoressi is Poetry Editor at Large for the Los Angeles Review of Books (LARB). Stemming from their "deep interest in interdisciplinary approaches to writing, art, and ecological culture," they created Voluble, an "off-the-page makers’ space for writers and artists of all kinds," supported by LARB.

They have written about their experiences with nystagmus and how the visual/neurological difference has shaped their work as a poet and a reader.

They now teach in the Warren Wilson College MFA Program for Writers, and at University of North Carolina Chapel-Hill, where they are an Associate Professor and Walker Percy Fellow in Poetry. They live in North Carolina with their partner Angeline Shaka. Currently, they serve as the director for The Frost Place Conference on Poetry in Franconia, NH.

== Awards and honors ==
- 2000 Stegner Fellowship at Stanford University.
- 2002 Rona Jaffe Foundation Writers' Award.
- 2002 Jones Lectureship at Stanford University.
- 2006 Connecticut Book Award in Poetry, winner for The Last Time I Saw Amelia Earhart.
- 2009 Los Angeles Times Book Prize, finalist for Apocalyptic Swing.
- 2012 Lannan Foundation Writers' Residency in Marfa.
- 2018 Audre Lorde Award for Lesbian Poetry (Publishing Triangle), for Rocket Fantastic.
- 2025 National Book Award for Poetry, finalist for The New Economy.

== Works ==
- The Last Time I Saw Amelia Earhart. Persea Books. 2005. ISBN 9780892553150. OCLC 56591239
- Apocalyptic Swing. Persea Books. 2009. ISBN 9780892553532. OCLC 892496860
- The New Economy Chapbook Vol. 1: Inexpensive, Healthy, Hopeful Feasts for 2017.
- Rocket Fantastic. Persea Books. September 2017. ISBN 9780892554850. OCLC 1008903574
- The New Economy. Copper Canyon Press. 2025. ISBN 9781556597213.
