= Bo Caldwell =

Bo Caldwell is the author of the national bestsellers The Distant Land of My Father (2002), and The City of Tranquil Light (2011). Her short fiction has been published in Ploughshares, Story, Epoch, and other literary journals.

== Early life ==
Bo Caldwell was born in Oklahoma City, grew up in Los Angeles, and graduated from Stanford University, where she later held a Wallace Stegner Fellowship and a Jones Lectureship in Creative Writing.

== Career ==
Her first novel, The Distant Land of My Father, published by Chronicle Books in 2001, was a national bestseller, one of the Los Angeles Times’ Best Books of 2001, and a Booksense 76 pick in both hardcover and paperback. The book was selected for community reading programs in Pasadena, Santa Clara County, and the City of Claremont. Her second novel, City of Tranquil Light, published by Henry Holt in 2010, was a Los Angeles Times bestseller, an October 2010 Indie Next Notable, and one of O Magazine’s Ten Must Reads for October 2010. Her short stories have appeared in Story, Ploughshares, Epoch, Image, and other literary journals, and her personal essays in O, The Oprah Magazine, the Washington Post Magazine, Image, and America Magazine. She has received fellowships from the National Endowment for the Arts and the Arts Council of Santa Clara County, as well as the Georgia Shreve Prize in Fiction at Stanford University and the Joseph Henry Jackson Award from the San Francisco Foundation. She lives in Maryland with her husband, novelist Ron Hansen.
