= Chanda Feldman =

American poet (born 1976)

Amaryllis Chanda Feldman (born 1976) is an American poet. She is an associate professor of creative writing at Oberlin College, where she has taught since 2017. Feldman was born in Tennessee in 1976. She holds a Bachelor of Arts degree in English language and literature from the University of Chicago (1999), as well as a Master of Fine Arts degree in poetry from Cornell University (2003). She also held a Stegner Fellowship at Stanford University from 2008 to 2010, as well as a MacDowell Fellowship in 2009, and National Endowment for the Arts creative writing fellowship in 2011. Feldman has been noted in Callaloo as an example of Black people in poetry at American colleges and universities, alongside other Black poets.

Her first collection, entitled Approaching the Fields, was published by LSU Press in 2018; the book contains four sections, with 22 poems total. The collection received a positive review from Nan Cohen, as well as a review from David M. Brunson. A second collection, Glance, received the L.E. Phillabaum Poetry Award from the same publisher as of 2024.
