= Emporium (short story collection) =

First edition (publ. Viking Press)

Emporium is the debut short-story collection by San Francisco writer and Stanford University Jones Lecturer Adam Johnson. Emporium collected nine stories that previously appeared in American literary journals and magazines. Penguin published the paperback edition in 2003. Translated into French, Japanese, Serbian, German and Catalan, Emporium was named “Debut of the Year” by Amazon.com. Described as a “remarkable debut” by the New Yorker and “The Arrival of a talented new writer” by the New York Times, Johnson’s Emporium was nominated for a Young Lions Fiction Award by the New York Public Library. According to Daniel Mendelsohn, writing for New York Magazine, “Johnson's oh-so-slightly futuristic flights of fancy, his vaguely Blade Runner–esque visions of a cluttered, anaerobic American culture, illustrate something very real, very current: the way we must embrace the unknown, take risks, in order to give flavor and meaning to life.”

== Story publications ==
- "Cliff Gods of Acapulco" in Esquire
- "The History of Cancer" in Hayden's Ferry Review
- "The Canadanaut"; Part I in Harper's; Part II in The Paris Review
- "Your Own Backyard" in The Southeast Review
- "The Death-Dealing Cassini Satellite" in New England Review
- "Teen Sniper" in Harper's Magazine
- "Trauma Plate" in The Virginia Quarterly Review, Reprinted in The Barcelona Review
- "The Jughead of Berlin"
- "The Eighth Sea"
