= Catherine Davis =

American poet

- Born: 1924; Minneapolis, MN
- Died: 2002 (aged 77–78)

Catherine Davis (1924–2002) was an American poet. Born in Minneapolis, Minnesota, she studied poetry with J. V. Cunningham at the University of Chicago, and, at Stanford University, with Yvor Winters, graduating in 1951. Davis received her bachelor's degree from George Washington University in 1961, at the age of 37, and subsequently joined the University of Iowa's prestigious creative writing program. The poet Donald Justice, whom she met while at Iowa, was a lifelong champion of her work. UCLA poet Edgar Bowers compared her work favorably to that of Dorothy Parker. Davis held the Stegner Fellowship in Creative Writing at Stanford. She taught at several universities.

Davis died in 2002 of complications related to Alzheimer's disease. She died intestate, leaving the copyrights to her works in limbo.

== Publications ==
Davis published four works:

- The Leaves: Lyrics and Epigrams (Bembo Press, 1960)
- Second Beginnings & Other Poems (The King’s Quair Press, 1961)
- Under This Lintel (King’s Quair Press, 1962)
- Looking In and Looking Out (R. L. Barth, 1999).
