= Nan Cohen =

American writer (born 1968)

- Born: 1968 (age 57–58)
- Education: Yale University; University of California, Los Angeles
- Occupations: Poet; educator
- Children: 1
- Writing career
- Notable awards: Rona Jaffe Foundation Writers' Award (2005)

Nan Cohen (born 1968) is an American poet and teacher. She has published three three poetry collections: Rope Bridge, Unfinished City, and Thousand-Year-Old Words.

== Life ==
She was raised in Reisterstown, Maryland, and graduated from Yale University and the University of California, Los Angeles.

Her poetry collections are Rope Bridge (Cherry Grove, 2005) and Unfinished City (Gunpowder Press, 2007). Cohen's poems have appeared in Tikkun, Poetry International, Prairie Schooner, The Prentice-Hall Anthology of Women's Literature, Ploughshares Prairie Schooner, Western Humanities Review, Nimrod, The San Francisco Review, Response: A Contemporary Jewish Review, Hayden's Ferry Review, and other magazines and anthologies.

Cohen has taught literature and creative writing at Viewpoint School, community college, and university levels, at the Stanford Medical School, and in the Master of Professional Writing Program at the University of Southern California. Since 2003, she has served as the poetry director of the Napa Valley Writers' Conference. In 2017, she competed in the Jeopardy! Teachers Tournament, finishing as first runner-up. She lives with her husband and daughter in Los Angeles.

== Awards ==
Her awards and honors include a 2003 NEA (National Endowment for the Arts) Fellowship and a 2005 Rona Jaffe Foundation Writers' Award. She also has received a Stegner Fellowship and Jones Lectureship in poetry at Stanford University.

== Works ==
- "A Newborn Girl at Passover", poemhunter
- "A Northern Winter", "Rope Bridge", "Distinguished Poet of a Small Country", "Horatio", Cherry Grove
- "Girder", Verse Daily
- Rope Bridge. Wordtech Communications. March 2005. ISBN 978-1-932339-77-2.
- Thousand-Year-Old Words. Glass Lyre Press. October 1, 2021. ISBN 978-1941783795.
