= Mariette in Ecstasy =

1991 novel written by Ron Hansen

- Author: Ron Hansen
- Subject: Consecrated life, religious ecstasy
- Genre: Fiction
- Publisher: E. Burlingame Books/HarperCollins
- Publication date: 1991
- Pages: 179
- ISBN: 9780060182144

Mariette in Ecstasy is a 1991 novel written by Ron Hansen. it is set in a convent in New York in 1906. Critics describe it as a "wonderful and strange novel" and a "spiritual wellspring of a novel".

== Plot ==
State of New York, 1906: the seventeen-year-old Mariette Baptiste enters the convent of the Sisters of the Crucifixion at the priory of Our Lady of Sorrows as a postulant. Prioress of the convent is her biological sister Céline, twenty years elder than her, and, as it turns out, terminally ill with cancer. Quite young for her ministry, she is the successor of the older Mother Saint-Raphael, who is now mistress of novices.

A few months after leaving behind the bourgeois life Mariette had grown up in, she begins to experience visions and mystical crises that culminate with the appearance of stigmata on her body. As the prioress slowly succumbs to the cancer, the nuns are at a loss as to how to deal with the young postulant: some believe her, others consider her an impostor. A relatively large group of sisters resent the sensation that the stigmata cause in the convent and among the faithful living in the parish. After Mother Céline's death and burial, Mariette and the |mistress of novices, Mother Saint-Raphael, is elected prioress again, Mariette's stigmata suddenly vanish and she is expelled from the convent. She returns to live with her father. It is suggested that the pain of the stigmata has remained; likewise, she still has a great longing for the consecrated life in the priory.

== Awards ==
In 1992, Hansen's book received the Barnes and Noble Discover Award, the Commonwealth Club of California Gold Medal in Fiction and the Bay Area Book Reviewers Association 1992 Award in Fiction.

== Adaptions ==
In 1996, the novel was adapted into a film (starring Geraldine O'Rawe as the titular character and Eva Marie Saint as Mother Saint-Raphael) but it was never released because the production company and intended distributor, Savoy Pictures, who was co-producing the film with Price Entertainment and Rastar, went bankrupt.

In 2009, the novel was adapted for the stage and produced at Lifeline Theatre in Chicago. In 2019, the film was shown for the first time at the Camerimage International Film Festival by director John Bailey, during a retrospective of his career. On October 30, 2026, the film was finally released digitally by Universal Pictures Home Entertainment, who is the successor to Savoy Pictures.
