= David Biespiel =

American poet, memoirist, and critic

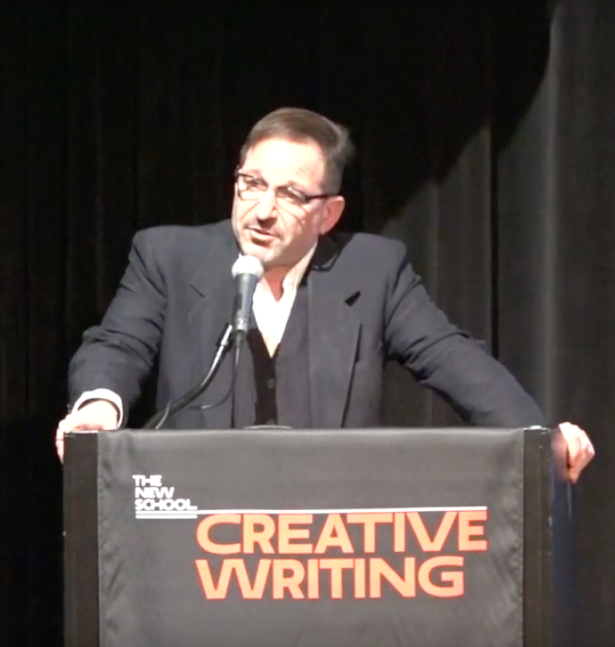
- Biespiel speaking at the New School in New York, March 2016
- Born: 18 February 1964 (age 62). Tulsa, Oklahoma
- Education: Stanford University (1995), University of Maryland (1991), Boston University (1986)
- Occupations: writer and professor
- Children: Lucas Biespiel
- Writing career
- Genres: poetry, memoir, criticism
- Notable works: Republic Café (2019), The Education of a Young Poet (2017), A Long High Whistle (2015), Charming Gardeners (2013), The Book of Men and Women (2009), Wild Civility (2003)
- Website: db1547.wix.com/david-biespiel

David Biespiel (born 1964) is an American poet, critic, memoirist, novelist, and painter. He was born and raised in the Meyerland section of Houston, Texas. He is the founder of the Attic Institute of Arts and Letters in Portland, Oregon and Poet-in-Residence at Oregon State University.

== Biography ==
The youngest of three sons, David Biespiel—pronounced buy-speel—attended Beth Yeshurun, the oldest Jewish school in Houston. Reared in a family that valued academic and athletic excellence (one brother was a member of the United States Gymnastics team), he competed in the U.S. Diving Championships against Olympians Greg Louganis and Bruce Kimball, and later coached and developed regional and national champions and finalists in diving. In 1982 he moved to Boston on a diving scholarship at Boston University. In 1989 he moved to Washington, D.C., where he studied with Stanley Plumly at the University of Maryland, as well as with Michael Collier and Phillis Levin. He later held a Stegner Fellowship in Poetry Stanford University.

== Career ==
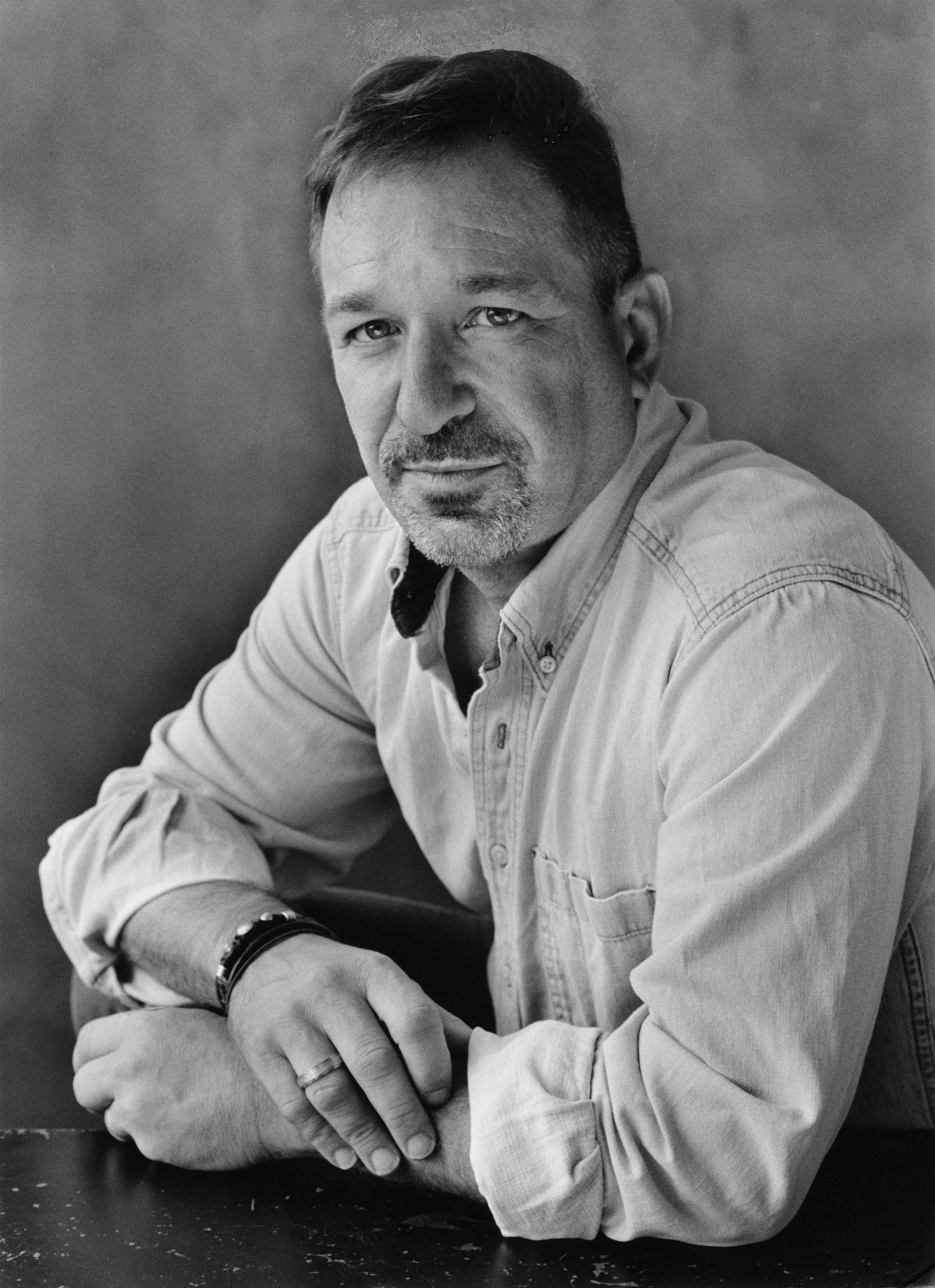

Biespiel began publishing poems and essays in 1986 after moving to remote Brownsville, Vermont. From 1988 to 1993 he lived and wrote in Washington, D.C., and from 1993 to 1995 in San Francisco. He has lived in Portland, Oregon since 1995.

He is the author or editor of fourteen books, and a contributor to American Poetry Review, The New Republic, The New Yorker, Poetry, and Slate, as well as Bookforum, the Rumpus Magazine, The Washington Post, and The New York Times. From 2003-2013 he write the poetry column for The Oregonian, the longest running poetry newspaper column in the U.S.

In 1999, he founded the Attic Institute of Arts and Letters, an independent literary studio. Faculty and Teaching Fellows at the Attic Institute have included: Cheryl Strayed, Matthew Dickman, Whitney Otto, Karen Karbo, Ariel Gore, among others.

He was editor of Poetry Northwest from 2005-2010.

During 2008–2012 Biespiel was a regular contributor to The Politico's Arena, a cross-party, cross-discipline daily conversation about politics and policy among current and former members of Congress, governors, mayors, political strategists and scholars.

In 2009 he helped formed the trio Incorporamento. The artistic group included Oregon Ballet Theater principal dancer Gavin Larsen and musician Joshua Pearl.

He has taught creative writing and literature throughout the United States, including at George Washington University, University of Maryland, Stanford University, and Wake Forest University, and, since 2001, in the MFA program at Oregon State University.

== Awards ==
- National Book Critics Circle Balakian Citation for Criticism, 2019
- National Book Critics Circle Balakian, finalist, 2018
- Oregon Book Award in Nonfiction, A Long High Whistle, 2016
- Oregon Book Award in Poetry, The Book of Men and Women, 2011
- Lannan Fellowship, 2007
- Pacific Northwest Bookseller's Award, A Long Journey, 2006
- National Endowment for the Arts, 1997
- Stegner Fellowship, 1993–1995

== Publications ==
=== Books ===
- Beautiful Is the World: New and Selected Poems, 1996-2026, 2026
- A Self-Portrait in the Year of the High Commission on Love, 2023
- A Place of Exodus: Home, Memory, and Texas, 2020
- Republic Cafe, 2019
- The Education of a Young Poet, 2017
- A Long High Whistle: Selected Columns on Poetry, 2015
- Charming Gardeners, 2013
- Every Writer Has a Thousand Faces, 2010
- The Book of Men and Women, 2009
- Wild Civility, 2003
- Pilgrims & Beggars, 2002
- Shattering Air, 1996

=== Edited Collections ===
- Poems of the American South, 2014
- Long Journey: Contemporary Northwest Poets, 2006

=== Recording ===
Citizen Dave: Selected Poems 1996–2010
