= The Kid (novel) =

2016 historical western novel by Ron Hansen

- First edition
- Author: Ron Hansen
- Subject: Billy the Kid
- Genre: Western novel
- Publisher: Scribners
- Publication date: 2016
- Pages: 320
- ISBN: 9781501129759

The Kid is a 2016 historical western novel written by Ron Hansen. It is about the legendary Old West outlaw, Billy the Kid, including his involvement in the Lincoln County War of New Mexico.

== Reception ==
According to Publishers Weekly, The Kid is "entertaining and lively…an excellent, transportive read".
