= Eddie Chuculate =

American fiction writer

- Born: 1978 (age 47–48); Claremore, Oklahoma, U.S.
- Occupations: Writer and editor
- Writing career
- Genre: Literary fiction

Eddie Chuculate (born 1978) is an American fiction writer who is enrolled in the Muscogee (Creek) Nation and of Cherokee descent. He earned a Wallace Stegner Fellowship in creative writing at Stanford University. His first book is Cheyenne Madonna. For his short story, Galveston Bay, 1826, Chuculate was awarded the O. Henry Award. In 2010 World Literature Today featured Chuculate as the journal's "Emerging Author."

== Background ==
Chuculate was born in Claremore, Oklahoma, in 1978 but grew up primarily in Muskogee, Oklahoma. He worked as a newspaper sports writer for nine years and a copy editor for ten. He later earned a degree in creative writing from the Institute of American Indian Arts and held a two-year Wallace Stegner Fellowship in creative writing at Stanford University. In 2010 he was admitted to the Iowa Writers' Workshop at the University of Iowa, where he graduated with a master's degree in 2013.

== Career ==
=== Author ===
Chuculate wrote Voices at Dawn: New Work from the Institute of American Indian Arts 1995-1996.

His story, Yoyo was published by The Iowa Review and it received a Pushcart Prize citation.

Chuculate won a PEN / O. Henry Award in 2007 for his story, Galveston Bay, 1826. In it, four Cheyenne people encounter the ocean for the first time when they travel to the Gulf of Mexico, experiencing a "cataclysmic journey" on their way. Ursula K. Le Guin, a short-story writer and novelist, was one of the jurors and she wrote an essay about her favorite piece. She said Chuculate's story "won me first, and last, by surprising me: every sentence unexpected, yet infallible. On rereading, both qualities remain... The calm, beautiful, unexplaining accuracy of description carries us right through the madness of the final adventure." Chuculate's stories have appeared in Manoa, Ploughshares, Blue Mesa Review, Many Mountains Moving and The Kenyon Review. In the July / August 2010 edition of World Literature Today, Chuculate was featured as the journal's "Emerging Author."

His first book of fiction, Cheyenne Madonna, was published in July 2012. It is about a young Creek/Cherokee man who writes home to his father as he wanders the Southwest. Joy Harjo, a Creek poet, says that it "investigates the broken-heart nation of Indian men. The epicenter of action is the tenuous meeting place between boyhood and manhood, between fierce need and desire." The seven stories follow the life of Jordan Coolwater, who leaves Oklahoma and goes West to pursue a sculpting career, all the while battling the two constants in his life: alcohol and art. The stories also explore history, myth, interracial relationships, racism and father-son relationships. On July 19, 2010, Publishers Weekly review stated, "Chuculate writes forthright prose in a somber key, examining without judgment the lives of Native American characters. ... Memory and will converge here to powerful effect."

"Dear Shorty" from the book is also published in Road to Nowhere and Other New Stories from the Southwest.

=== Journalist ===
Chuculate has worked at The Tulsa World, The Fort Worth Star-Telegram, The Denver Post and The Manhattan Mercury. He is an editor for the Trillium Literary Journal.

=== Educator ===
Chuculate is on the faculty of Lighthouse Writers Workshop in Denver.
