= Boneyard Beach (album) =

Studio album by Dish
- Released: June 27, 1995
- Genres: Alternative, indie rock
- Length: 46:13
- Language: English
- Label: Interscope Records
- Producer: John Agnello

Dish chronology
Mabel Sagittarius (1994)	Boneyard Beach (1995)

Boneyard Beach is a 1995 album by Raleigh, North Carolina band Dish, led by singer and pianist Dana Kletter, on Interscope Records. The album was produced by John Agnello at Ardent Studios in Memphis, Tennessee. Interscope's VP, Tom Whalley, told Billboard magazine that "the high quality of songwriting in Dish and the sound of Dana's voice are two things that set this band apart".

The album was not a commercial success and the group's members moved on to other projects, however the album did garner favorable reviews. CMJ New Music reviewed the album saying Kletter's vocals sounded like "tomboy version" of Natalie Merchant, while Trouser Press described the album as offering "elegant, haunting melodies with nary a hint of excess sugar". Musician noted "lush melodies and oblique lyrics". Music Hound described the sound of Dish as adding "rocked-up guitar and drums" to the sound of Kletter's earlier project Blackgirls.

== Track listing ==
1. "Headlights" Dana Kletter
2. "Wading" Dana Kletter / Bo Taylor
3. "Be Still" Bo Taylor
4. "Function" Dana Kletter
5. "Sad Figure" Dana Kletter
6. "Disguise" Bo Taylor
7. "Other Moon" Dana Kletter
8. "Tears of Rage"
9. "How Could Anyone" Dana Kletter
10. "January Song" Dana Kletter
11. "Odinokaya, Garmon (The Lonely Accordion)"
12. "Mercury" Sara Bell
13. "New Life" Dana Kletter
