= Max Crawford (writer) =

American novelist

- Born: Max Fleming Crawford; August 6, 1938; Lubbock, Texas, U.S.
- Died: October 7, 2010 (aged 72); Livingston, Montana, U.S.
- Citizenship: American
- Education: University of Texas at Austin; Stanford University
- Occupation: Writer
- Spouse: Susan Parsons (divorced)
- Writing career
- Genres: Historical fiction, Western,
- Notable works: Waltz Across Texas; Lords of the Plain

Max Fleming Crawford (August 6, 1938 – October 7, 2010) was an American writer. He was born in Lubbock, Texas, and grew up in Floydada, Texas. Crawford was influenced by Ernest Hemingway, Graham Greene, and Malcolm Lowry. His friendships with other writers were a great influence in his life and career as well, including Larry McMurtry, Wendell Berry, Michael Koepf, Raymond Carver, Chuck Kinder, Al Young, Diane Smith, Bill Kittredge, Scott Turow, Jon Jackson and James Crumley.

== Personal life ==
He attended the University of Texas at Austin, where he earned an undergraduate degree in economics and met his wife, Susan Sherzer Parsons. They moved to Mexico and lived in the Zona Rosa of Mexico City, where his son Peter was born. After the birth of his daughter Katherine in Houston, Crawford was awarded a Stegner Fellowship, and moved with his family to California. Over his life, he worked on his novels in Houston, London, Pézenas, France, Montana, and San Francisco.

== Career ==
Many of his novels are set in West Texas, such as Lords of the Plain, much admired by Ronald Reagan, and The Backslider, and others in California, such as The Bad Communist. He has also published poems and written and edited literary publications, such as The Redneck Review and 100 Flowers.

His papers are held in the Sowell Family Collection in Literature, Community, and the Natural World, part of the Southwest Collection/Special Collections Library at Texas Tech University.

== Works ==
- Waltz Across Texas (1975) – novel (first novel published)
- The Backslider (1976) – novel (first novel written)
- The Bad Communist (1979) – novel
- Lords of the Plain (1985) – novel
- Six Key Cut (1986) – novel
- Icarus (1988) – novel, with Michael Koepf
- Can't Dance (1989) – novel
- The Red & the White (1996) – novel
- Highschoolharry&co. (2000) – novel
- Wing Shot: A Novel (2001)
- Wamba: A Novel (2002)
- Eastertown: A Novel (2003)

== Quotes ==
No one knew when we would commence our second campaign. Our horses were fat, the men restless, all equipment and tack and supplies stood ready, and still we did not march out.

Lords of the Plain (1997)

In nine days’ march I reached some plains, so vast that I did not find their end anywhere I went … plains with no more landmarks than as if we had been swallowed up in the sea, where our guides strayed about, because there was not a stone, nor a bit of rising ground, nor a tree, nor a shrub, nor anything to go by …

Lords of the Plain (1997)
