= Atticus (novel) =

1996 novel by Ron Hansen

- First edition
- Author: Ron Hansen
- Genre: Fiction and mystery
- Publisher: HarperCollins
- Publication date: 1996
- Pages: 256
- ISBN: 9780061978142

Atticus is a murder-mystery novel written by Ron Hansen in 1996. The main character, Atticus Cody, is similar to Atticus Finch of To Kill a Mockingbird.

In 1996 it was a finalist for the National Book Award for Fiction, and in 1997 for the PEN/Faulkner Award for Fiction. In 2000 it was adapted into the film Missing Pieces starring James Coburn.
