= Greg Wrenn =

American poet

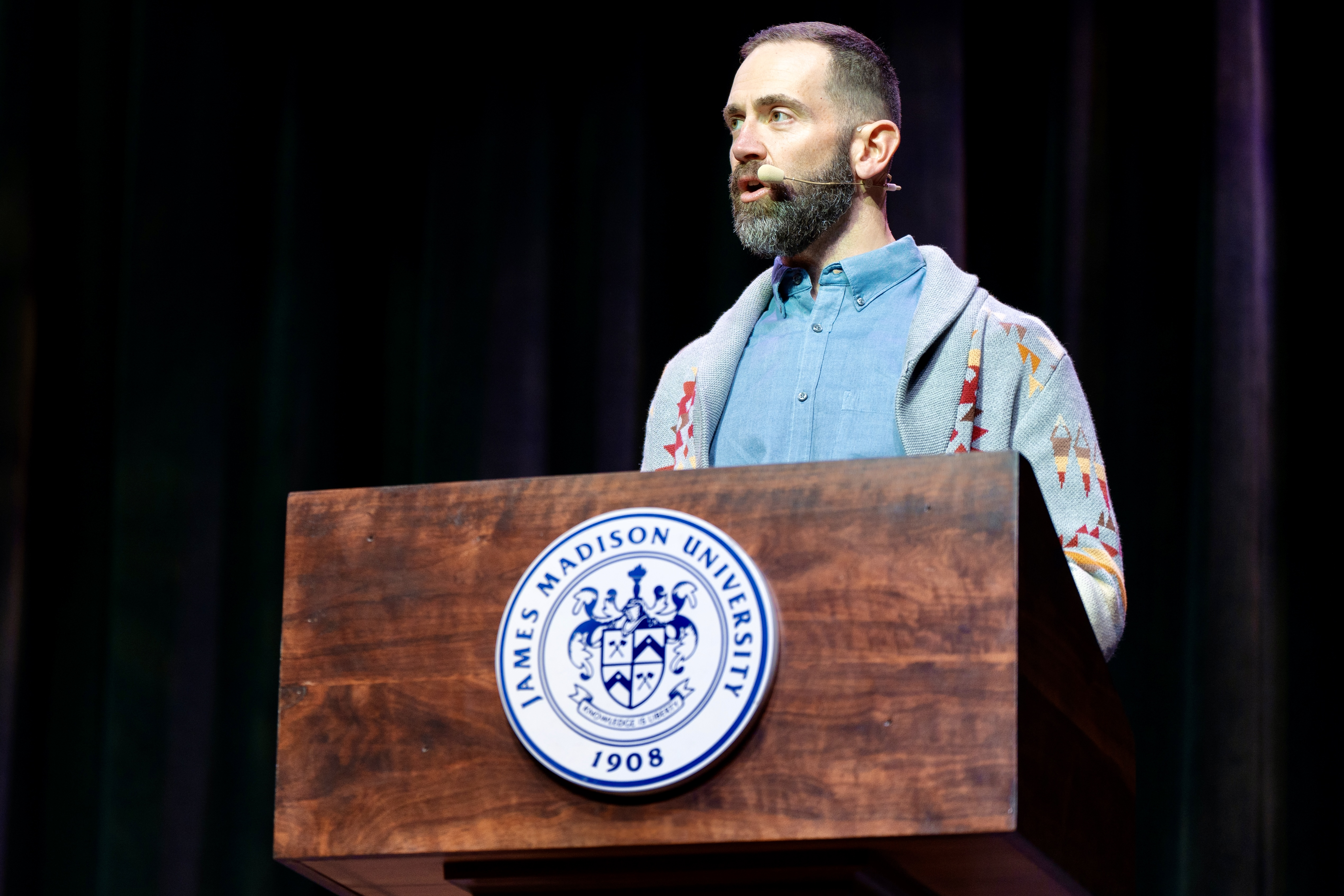
- Greg Wrenn introducing Garrard Conley at James Madison University
- Occupations: Writer, professor
- Writing career
- Genres: Memoir, environmental nonfiction, poetry
- Notable work: Mothership: A Memoir of Wonder and Crisis, Centaur
- Notable awards: Stegner Fellowship, Brittingham Prize
- Website: gregwrenn.com

Greg Wrenn is an American writer from Jacksonville, Florida. He lives in Harrisonburg, Virginia, where he is an associate professor of English at James Madison University. He was educated at Harvard University and Washington University in St. Louis. From 2010-2016 he was a Wallace Stegner Fellow in Poetry and then a Jones Lecturer at Stanford University.

His first book, Centaur, was selected by National Book Award-winning poet Terrance Hayes for the Brittingham Prize. His essays and poems have appeared in Al Jazeera, The New Republic, New England Review, The Rumpus, Beloit Poetry Journal, The American Poetry Review, The Kenyon Review, The Southern Review, The Yale Review, and elsewhere. Wrenn, a certified scuba diver, writes essays primarily about the ocean, including the coral reefs of the Raja Ampat archipelago.

== Career ==
=== Awards ===
- Stegner Fellowship, Stanford University (2010-2012)
- Brittingham Prize in Poetry for Centaur (2013)

== Bibliography ==
- Off the Fire Road (Green Tower Press, 2008)
- Centaur (University of Wisconsin Press, 2013)
- Mothership: A Memoir of Wonder and Crisis (Regalo Press, 2024)
