= Ron Hansen (novelist) =

American novelist, essayist, and professor

- Born: December 8, 1947 (age 78); Omaha, Nebraska, U.S.
- Education: Creighton University; Iowa Writers' Workshop (MFA); Santa Clara University (MA)
- Occupation: Novelist
- Writing career
- Genre: Fiction

Ron Hansen (born December 8, 1947) is an American novelist, essayist, and professor. He is known for writing literary westerns exploring the people and history of the American heartland, notably The Assassination of Jesse James by the Coward Robert Ford (1983), which was adapted into an acclaimed film.

== Biography ==
Ron Hansen was born in Omaha, Nebraska and reared as Catholic. He attended a Jesuit high school, Creighton Preparatory School, and earned a Bachelor's degree in English from Creighton University in Omaha in 1970.

Following military service, he earned an M.F.A. from the Iowa Writers' Workshop in 1974 and held a Wallace Stegner Creative Writing Fellowship at Stanford University. He later earned an M.A. in spirituality from Santa Clara University. Hansen is the Gerard Manley Hopkins, S.J. Professor in the Arts and Humanities at Santa Clara University, where he teaches courses in writing and literature. He is married to the writer Bo Caldwell.

In January 2007, Hansen was ordained as a permanent deacon in the Roman Catholic Church. In May 2009, Hansen was inducted to the college of fellows at Dominican School of Philosophy and Theology.

== Awards and fellowships ==
Hansen has received fellowships from the Michigan Society of Fellows, the National Endowment for the Arts, the John Simon Guggenheim Foundation, and the Lyndhurst Foundation, as well as an Award in Literature from the American Academy and Institute of Arts and Letters.

== Novels and short stories ==
Hansen frequently writes novels about the Old West, mixing history with morality and drama. Hansen's first novel, Desperadoes (1979), reimagines the story of the Dalton Gang. The Assassination of Jesse James by the Coward Robert Ford, a 1983 novel chronicling the life and death of the iconic outlaw, was Hansen's most popular work. It also brought him wide critical acclaim, and was nominated to the short list for the PEN/Faulkner Award. The novel was adapted into the 2007 film of the same name, for which Hansen was an advisor for the dialogue and an actor in a cameo role as a frontier reporter.

Catholic themes of love, redemption and resurrection recur in Hansen's novels and stories. Mariette in Ecstasy (1991), his novel of the faith and religious experience in the context of a cloistered Catholic nun who apparently bears the stigmata, earned him near universal critical praise. He won the fiction prize from the Bay Area Reviewers Association and the gold medal for Excellence in Fiction from the Commonwealth Club of California. Hansen's novel, Exiles (2008), tells in parallel the story of the shipwreck of the SS Deutschland, which cost the lives of five young nuns, and the story of poet Gerard Manley Hopkins who was inspired by the tragedy to write The Wreck of the Deutschland.

Hansen's 1996 novel, Atticus, about the bond of love between a father and a son who has died under mysterious circumstances in a dusty Mexican town, was a finalist for both the National Book Award and the PEN/Faulkner Award. Hitler's Niece (1999) is a historical novel that offers a view of Hitler as seen through the eyes of Geli Raubal, the daughter of his half-sister. Isn't It Romantic? (2003) is a comic novel about two sophisticated Parisians stranded in small-town Nebraska.

Hansen has published numerous short stories in literary magazines nationwide. His short story collection, Nebraska, was published in 1989. Hansen also edited the anthology You Don't Know What Love Is: Contemporary American Stories (1987) and co-edited with Jim Shepard You've Got to Read This: Contemporary American Writers Introduce Stories That Held Them in Awe (1994).

In addition to his novels and short stories, Hansen has published a compilation of essays on faith and fiction (A Stay Against Confusion) and a children's book (The Shadowmaker). Hansen also wrote the screenplay for the 1996 film adaptation of Mariette in Ecstasy.

In 2016, Hansen wrote about the life of Billy the Kid in a novel titled simply The Kid.

== Adaptations ==
- In 2000, Atticus was adapted into the film Missing Pieces starring James Coburn.
- In 2006, The Assassination of Jesse James by the Coward Robert Ford was adapted for the screen in a film written and directed by Andrew Dominik and starring Brad Pitt as James. The film was edited for a September 21, 2007 release.
- In 2009, Mariette in Ecstasy was adapted for the stage and produced at Lifeline Theatre in Chicago.
- Hansen co-wrote the screenplay for the 2020 film The World to Come along with Jim Shepard, from Shepard's short story.

== Bibliography ==
=== Novels ===
- Desperadoes (1979)
- The Assassination of Jesse James by the Coward Robert Ford (1983)
- The Shadowmaker (1987)
- Mariette in Ecstasy (1991)
- Atticus (1996) ISBN 0-06-092786-0
- Hitler's Niece (1999) ISBN 0-06-093220-1
- Isn't It Romantic?: An Entertainment (2003)
- Exiles (2008)
- A Wild Surge of Guilty Passion (2011)
- The Kid (2016)

=== Collections ===
- Nebraska (1989)
- A Stay Against Confusion: Essays on Faith and Fiction (2001)
- She Loves Me Not: New and Selected Stories (2012)

=== As editor or contributor ===
- You Don't Know What Love Is: Contemporary American Stories (Compiler) (1987)
- You've Got to Read This: Contemporary American Writers Introduce Stories That Held Them in Awe (Editor, with Jim Shepard) (1994)
- John of the Cross: Selections from The Dark Night and Other Writings (Foreword) (2004)
- Flyover Fiction, series from University of Nebraska Press (Series editor) (2005–present)
