= Charlotte Painter =

American novelist and writer

Charlotte Painter (born 1926) is an American novelist and writer, best known for her nonfiction photo essay Gifts of Age, which profiles notable older women, including Julia Child.

Painter was born in Baton Rouge, Louisiana. She published her first short story in the New Yorker in 1955. Her first novel, The Fortunes of Laurie Breaux (1961) won her a Stegner Fellowship in 1962. She earned her Masters in English from Stanford in 1966, and taught there until 1969. She has taught creative writing at the University of California, Berkeley, University of California, Davis, and University of California, Santa Cruz as well as at San Francisco State University.

== Partial bibliography ==
- The Fortunes of Laurie Breaux (1961)
- Who Made the Lamb? (1965)
- Confessions from the Malaga Madhouse (1971)
- Revelations: Diaries of Women (Vintage Books, 1975) ISBN 0-394-71151-3 (edited by Mary Jane Moffat & Painter; afterword by Painter)
- Seeing Things (1976)
- Gifts of Age: 32 Remarkable Women (Chronicle Books, 1985) ISBN 978-0-87701-368-6
- Conjuring Tibet (Mercury House, 1997) ISBN 1-56279-095-1
