= Scott Hutchins =

American novelist and short story writer (born 1974)

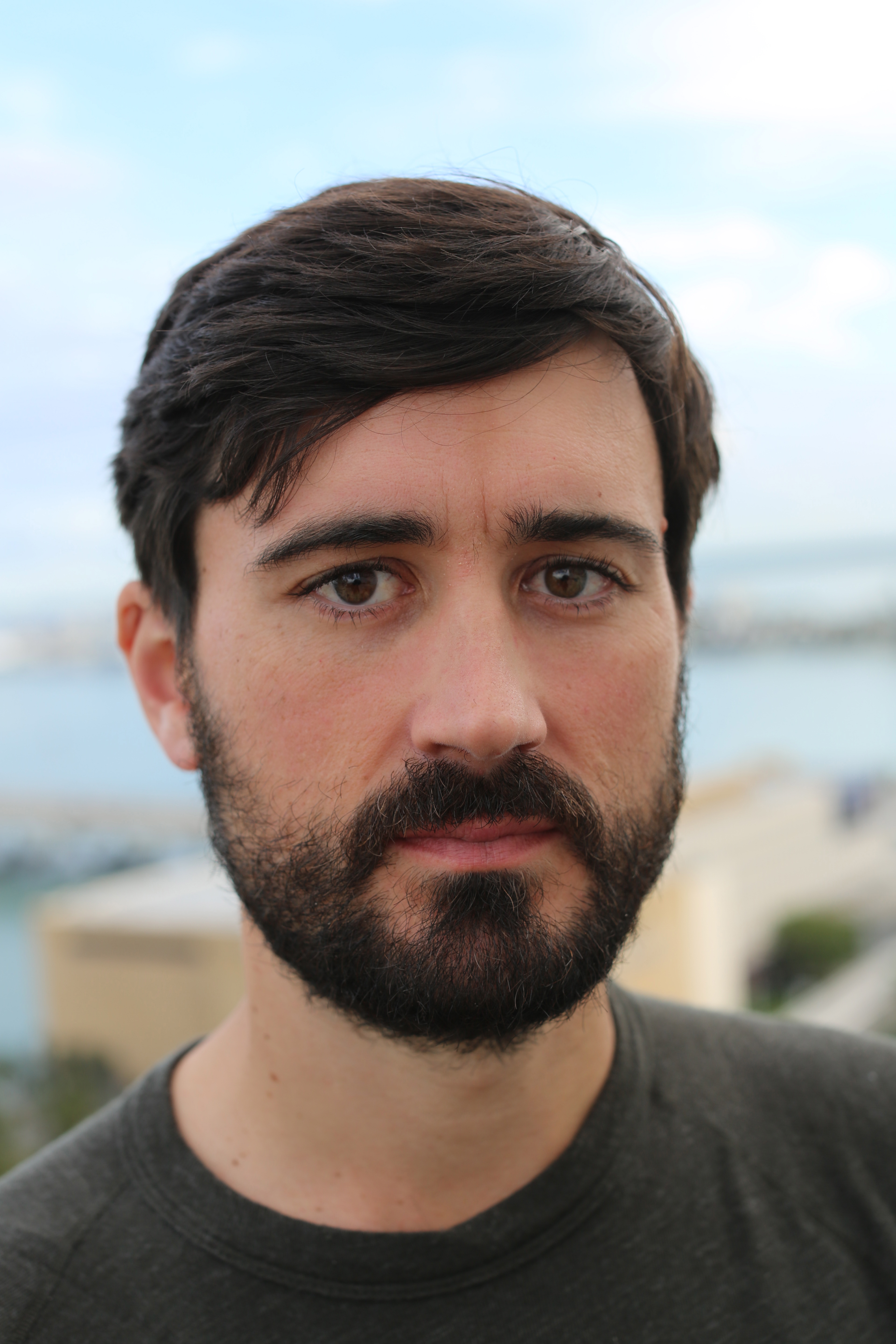
- Born: March 4, 1974 (age 52); Arkansas, U.S.
- Occupations: Author, lecturer
- Writing career
- Genre: Fiction

Scott Hutchins (born March 4, 1974) is an American novelist and short story writer.

== Biography ==
Scott Hutchins is an American novelist and short-story writer. A native of Arkansas, he was awarded a Stegner Fellowship from Stanford University. His work has appeared in StoryQuarterly, Five Chapters, The Owls, The Rumpus, The New York Times, San Francisco and Esquire. His debut novel A Working Theory of Love has been called both "revelatory and exciting" and "ambitious and accomplished." He currently holds a Jones Lectureship in Stanford's creative writing program.

== Bibliography ==
A Working Theory of Love
