= Tom W. Mayer =

Thomas W. Mayer is a writer and retired professor of the English Department at the University of New Mexico, Albuquerque, where he held the position of Associate Professor during his tenure there from the 1970s through 1990s.

He graduated from Wallace Stegner's Stanford Writing Program

Mayer’s short story, "Homecoming," from his first book of short stories, Bubblegum and Kipling, was selected for the Prize Stories 1965: The O. Henry Awards, appearing alongside stories from such noted authors as Donald Barthelme and Joyce Carol Oates. His second set of short stories, The Weary Falcon, was published in 1971 and is based on his experiences in Vietnam "as a free-lance magazine correspondent." Both books are presently out of print. However, a new edition of Bubblegum and Kipling with an introduction by Andre Dubus III is available from Pharos Editions.

Mayer is also a recreational air pilot with two airplanes, a D17S and a Midget Mustang II, both registered with the FAA in the city of Santa Cruz, New Mexico. He has also written two non-fiction books on flying, Mountain Flying (1981) and Climb for the Evening Star (1974), both of which are presently out of print.
