= Madeleine Cravens =

Madeleine Cravens is an American poet. She has earned fellowships from the National Endowment of the Arts and Stanford University. In 2024, she released her debut poetry collection, Pleasure Principle, with Scribner.

== Early life and education ==
Cravens was raised in Brooklyn. In Metal, Cravens shared that "Dream Song 14" was one of the first poems that moved her toward poetry. She attended the MFA program at Columbia University, where she was the recipient of the Max Rivto Poetry Fellowship. While in the program, she received first place in Narrative Magazine 's 2021 30 Below Contest and 2022 Poetry Contest. She graduated in 2022.

== Career ==
Cravens' poems have been featured in The New Yorker, The Kenyon Review, The Nation, Narrative Magazine, and more .

Cravens was a Stegner Fellow at Stanford University from 2022 to 2024. There, she extensively worked with teacher Louise Glück on the poems that would comprise her debut poetry collection.

Cravens published Pleasure Principle in 2024 with Scribner. Many of the poems in the collection were written when Cravens was 24 and 25. Among other things, the book's poems concern the duality between hedonism and monasticism: said Cravens, "I'm interested in the relief of verbalization, of giving in to an impulse, and also in the tension created by obfuscating this urge." Publishers Weekly said the collection "successfully delivers the eros and disorder of young adult life." The Adroit Journal said it was "a powerhouse of a book that announces Cravens as a major new voice in American poetry."
