= Parasites Like Us =

2003 novel by Adam Johnson

- Author: Adam Johnson
- Language: English
- Genre: Thriller
- Publisher: Viking
- Publication date: 2003
- Publication place: United States
- Media type: Print
- Pages: 341
- ISBN: 0670032409
- OCLC: 51241978
- Dewey Decimal: 813.54
- LC Class: PS3610.O3

Parasites Like Us (2003) is American author Adam Johnson's debut novel. In the novel, anthropologist Dr. Hannah and his graduate students uncover a Clovis burial site, only to usher in the end of civilization.

The book won a silver medal for fiction at the 2004 California Book Awards.
