= Nelson Bentley =

American poet

Nelson Bentley circa 1972

Nelson Bentley (1918–1990) was an American poet and professor at the University of Washington in Seattle. He was born in Elm, Michigan. He graduated from the University of Michigan, receiving his bachelor's and then his master's degree from that university.

Bentley studied under W. H. Auden. He was a friend and colleague of Theodore Roethke, among other Northwest poets who created a distinct regional voice. In his forty years as a professor he conducted workshops, hosted readings at literary venues around the city and on radio and public television, juried poetry contests, edited poetry for journals and newspapers, and was a co-founder of Poetry Northwest and The Seattle Review. Although he was an accomplished poet in his own right, those who knew him believed his teaching was more important to him; his wife Beth Singer Bentley said after his death that he "cared more for his students' success than for his own." He founded the Castalia Reading Series, which started at the University of Washington in the mid-seventies and continues today.

== Bibliography ==
- The Flying Oyster: The Collected Comic Apocalypses, Bellowing Ark Press, 1997
- The Collected Shorter Poems, Bellowing Ark Press, 1988
- Snoqualmie Falls Apocalypse, Confluence Press, Lewiston, 1981
- Iron Man of the Hoh, Copper Canyon Press, Port Townsend, 1978
- Moosecall, Jawbone Press, 1977
- A Day at North Cove, Raven's Mask Press, Seattle, 1974
- Grayland Apocalypse, Bonefire Press, Seattle, 1972
- Sea Lion Caves and Other Poems, from "New Poetry Series," Alan Swallow, Denver, 1967
