= Stephen Ratcliffe =

American poet

- Born: July 7, 1948 (age 78); Boston, MA
- Occupations: Poet, Publisher
- Website: stephenratcliffe.blogspot.com

Stephen Ratcliffe (born July 7, 1948, in Boston, Massachusetts) is a contemporary U.S. poet and critic who has published a number of books of poetry and three books of criticism. He lives in Bolinas, CA and is the publisher of Avenue B Press. He was the director of the Creative Writing program at Mills College in Oakland, CA where he has been an instructor for more than 25 years, and continues to teach Creative Writing (poetry) and Literature (poetry, Shakespeare) courses there.

As of 2010, Ratcliffe has published at least 19 books of poetry (21 including the e-editions on Ubuweb) and as the editor and publisher of Avenue B Press.

== Life and work ==
Ratcliffe moved to the San Francisco Bay area when he was 4 and has lived in Bolinas, CA since 1973. Ratcliffe attended Reed College for one and a half years before transferring to the University of California at Berkeley to finish his bachelor's degree and complete his PhD. He was also a Stegner Fellow at Stanford in 1974-75.

The focus of Ratcliffe's early academic career was on Renaissance poetry. Ratcliffe has pointed to his work on Thomas Campion during this time period as a defining event in his artistic development and poetic practice up to this point.

By the early 1980s, Ratcliffe had begun to read and ‘learn’ about, and from, the Language poets after his friend Bill Berkson, a fellow poet from Bolinas, gave Ratcliffe his set of original L=A=N=G=U=A=G=E magazines.

Ratcliff draws much of his inspiration from where he lives in Bolinas, California.

== Poetics and recent work ==
Ratcliffe recognizes that his own particular commitment to writing has, over the years, displayed itself as something which works "serially":

7.19

grey whiteness of clouds in front of invisible
ridge, quail landing on redwood fence in right
foreground, sound of waves breaking in channel

temporal in the empirical sense,
consciousness of time

red right angle, more and more,
gives the curved line

grey-white sky reflected in plane of channel,
shadowed slope of sandstone point on horizon

— from Temporality

I’ve been working "serially" for a long time now...That’s one of the things I’ve begun to realize, that whereas I thought the work in HUMAN / NATURE and Remarks on Color / Sound was about the physical ("real") world in relation to what we ‘make of it’ in our perception & thinking/feeling, I see now that it’s also ABOUT time, time passing in fact --- one moment at a time, one day at a time, throughout a lifetime in fact, while we’re ‘here’ as such. So the physical takes place in & by means of the temporal – hence "temporality" (maybe I will call the work I’m doing now Temporality, which can begin after Remarks on Color [...] which is about when I started to read the essay called “Temporality” (by Maurice Merleau-Ponty) in the first place -- who knows?).

Ratcliffe's writing from the past decade, beginning with 2000's Listening to Reading and stretching towards his most recent, ongoing Temporality project, becomes the insistent 'capture' of what, following on Merleau-Ponty, it could mean for us to be "meeting time on the way to subjectivity".

From this perspective, Ratcliffe's work not only addresses (tacitly) the concept of the "postmodern" 'crisis of the subject', but continues to invest itself, with increasing compactness and stability, in themes and obsessions he has delineated throughout his career, vocation, and a life devoted to "making" or poiesis.

Such an intense avowal implicates Ratcliffe's project within a timeline moving forward from the Renaissance poets to Stéphane Mallarmé and Henry James, or moving backward in time from Leslie Scalapino to the Language poets and Gertrude Stein. Along the way, in either direction, Ratcliffe may take instruction from practices as widely divergent as the radicalized "quietude" of Yvor Winters, or the aleatoric music and chance procedures of John Cage. (see also: Aleatoricism)

Ratcliffe never strayed far from the themes of "music" and "being in number" discovered in his initial "Campion project". He has not abandoned the touchstone that is Mallarmé, whose work he appropriated mid-career, culminating with 1998's Mallarmé: Poem in Prose. Ratcliffe's discussions of his writing processes, both in his interviews and essays, continue to acknowledge, along with Mallarmé, that:

The materiality of page, ink, paragraph, and spacing is often just as important as the logic of syntax, figure, and sense

== Selected bibliography ==
Criticism

- Campion: On Song (Routledge & Kegan Paul, 1981)
- Listening to Reading (Albany, NY: SUNY Press, 2000)
- Reading the Unseen: (Offstage) Hamlet (Denver, CO: Counterpath Press, 2010)

Poetry

- New York Notes (Tombouctou Books, 1983)
- Distance (Bolinas, CA: Avenue B, 1986)
- Mobile/Mobile (Los Angeles, CA: Echo Park Press, 1987)
- [where late the sweet] BIRDS SANG (Oakland, CA: O Books, 1989)
- Sonnets (Elmwood, CT: Potes & Poets Press, 1989)
- Talking in Tranquility: Interviews with Ted Berrigan (edited by Ratcliffe & Leslie Scalapino). (Bolinas/Oakland, CA: Avenue B / O Books, 1991)
- spaces in the light said to be where one/ comes from (Elmwood, CT: Potes & Poets Press, 1992)
- Sculpture (Littoral Books, 1996)
- Mallarmé: Poem in Prose (Santa Barbara, CA: Santa Barbara Review Publications, 1998)
- Idea's Mirror (Elmwood, CT: Potes & Poets, 1999)
- Conversation (Plein Air Editions) – forthcoming

Triptych/Trilogy

note: the following works are on-going projects designated by Ratcliffe as trilogy / triptych(s). The dates in [brackets] indicate the time period during which the work was written. For example, [2.9.98. - 5.28.99.] indicates February 9, 1998 - May 28, 1999.

- Triptych/Trilogy ~ each book is 474 pages/days :
  - Portraits & Repetition (The Post-Apollo Press, 2002) [2.9.98 – 5.28.99.]
  - REAL (Avenue B, 2007) [3.17.00 – 7.1.01]
  - CLOUD / RIDGE (Ubu editions, 2007) [7.2.01. – 10.18.02] – #25 in the “Publishing the Unpublishable” series available complete and on-line here
- Triptych/Trilogy ~ each book is 1,000 pages/days:
  - HUMAN / NATURE (Ubu editions, 2007) [10.19.02. – 7.14.05.] – #26 in the “Publishing the Unpublishable” series available complete and on-line here
  - Remarks on Color / Sound (Eclipse, 2010) [7.15.05. – 4.9.08.] – available complete and on-line here
  - Temporality [4.10.08. – 1.4.11] – an ongoing project appearing daily here as a blog text: Temporality, presumably up through its 1,000th day. "Temporality" is continuing on Ratcliffe's blog past that day [1.4.11] (January 4, 2011). Perhaps a new triptych has been started.
