= Talvikki Ansel =

American poet

- Education: Mount Holyoke College; Indiana University Bloomington
- Writing career
- Genre: Poetry

Talvikki Ansel is an American poet. She was chosen as the winner of the Yale Younger Poets Series in 1996 by James Dickey.

== Life ==
She graduated from Mount Holyoke College in 1985, and Indiana University Bloomington. Her poems have appeared in the anthologies New Young American Poets (Southern Illinois University, 2000) and The Pushcart Prize XXVI, and in magazines such as The Atlantic Monthly, The New Republic, The Journal, Poetry, Prairie Schooner, and Shenandoah. She was a 2020 fellow at the James Merrill House in Stonington, CT.

She teaches at the University of Rhode Island.

== Awards ==
- Lannan Foundation resident, Marfa, Spring 2006.
- Stegner Fellowship in Creative Writing, from Stanford University
- Virginia Commission for the Arts Fellowship.

== Works ==
- World, The Atlantic Monthly, July/August 2001
- Bird Calls, Blackbird, Spring 2002
- Swallows, Blackbird, Spring 2002
- Seed Savers, Poetry Magazine, January/February 2007
- Mycorrhizae, Poetry, Volume CLXXXVI, Number 3 June 2005
- Tree List, Prairie Schooner, Mar 22, 2003
- Or Stay Again, Prairie Schooner, Mar 22, 2003
- Blue Collection, Prairie Schooner, Mar 22, 2003

=== Books ===
- My Shining Archipelago, Yale University Press, 1997. ISBN 0-300-07031-4,
- Jetty Lincoln, Neb.: Zoo Press, 2003. ISBN 9781932023077, OCLC 52471856

== Reviews ==
With admirable economy, the title Jetty announces two significant features of Talvikki Ansel's second book: the liminal vantage-point of the narrators of these poems and the curious ways in which the human world intersects with the natural.
