= Customs (poetry collection) =

Poetry collection by Solmaz Sharif

- First edition
- Author: Solmaz Sharif
- Publisher: Graywolf Press

Customs is a poetry collection by Solmaz Sharif published in 2022.

== Writing and development ==
Sharif has said she feels Customs is more transgressive than her earlier collection, Look.

== Reception ==
Writing in The New York Times, Jessica Gigot praised the collection, writing that Sharif's "reflections on freedom, consumerism and loyalty are at once witty and incisive".
