= Adam Johnson (writer) =

American writer (born 1967)

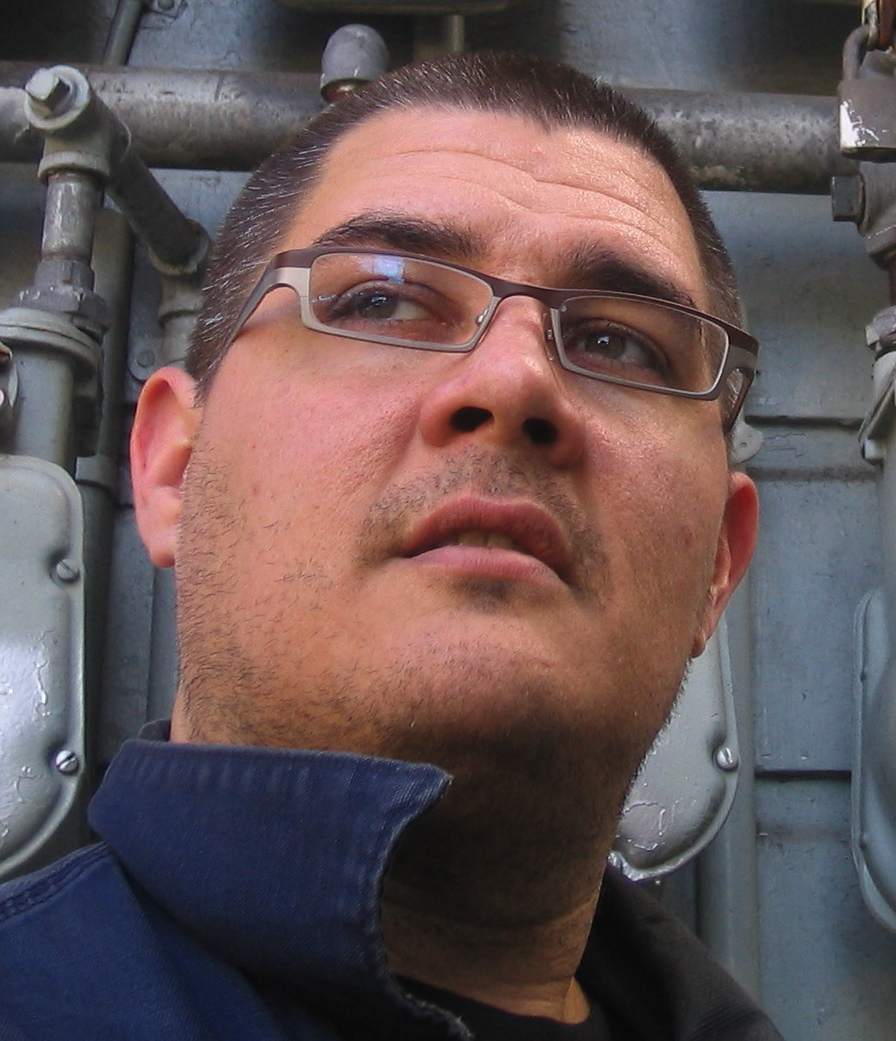
- Johnson in 2006
- Born: July 12, 1967 (age 59); South Dakota, U.S.
- Education: Arizona State University, Tempe (BA); McNeese State University (MFA); Florida State University (PhD)
- Occupations: Author, lecturer
- Writing career
- Genre: Fiction
- Notable awards: Pulitzer Prize, National Book Award

Adam Johnson (born July 12, 1967) is an American novelist and short story writer. He won the Pulitzer Prize for his 2012 novel, The Orphan Master's Son, and the National Book Award for his 2015 story collection Fortune Smiles. He is also a professor of English at Stanford University with a focus on creative writing.

== Early life ==
Johnson was born in South Dakota and is an enrolled member of the Cheyenne River Sioux Tribe. He was raised in Tempe, Arizona, and attended Marcos de Niza High School.

== Education ==
Johnson earned a BA in Journalism from Arizona State University in 1992, though he studied principally with the fiction writer Ron Carlson. He earned an MFA from the writing program at McNeese State University in 1996, where he studied with Robert Olen Butler and John Wood. In 2001, he earned a PhD in English from Florida State University. Janet Burroway directed his dissertation.

== Career ==
Johnson is currently a San Francisco writer and professor in creative writing at Stanford University. He founded the Stanford Graphic Novel Project and was named "one of the nation's most influential and imaginative college professors" by Playboy magazine and "one of the most impressive professors at Stanford" by Business Insider.

Johnson is the author of the novel The Orphan Master's Son (2012), which Michiko Kakutani, writing in The New York Times, called, "a daring and remarkable novel, a novel that not only opens a frightening window on the mysterious kingdom of North Korea, but one that also excavates the very meaning of love and sacrifice." Johnson's interest in the topic arose from his sensitivity to the language of propaganda, wherever it occurs. Johnson also wrote the short-story collections Emporium and Fortune Smiles and the novel Parasites Like Us, which won a California Book Award in 2003. His work has been published in Esquire, Harper's Magazine, Tin House, and The Paris Review, as well as Best New American Voices and The Best American Short Stories. Recently, his short story "George Orwell was a Friend of Mine" was published by 21st Editions in The Janus Turn with photographs in platinum by George A. Tice.

Johnson's work focuses on characters at the edge of society for whom isolation and disconnection are nearly permanent conditions. Michiko Kakutani described the central theme running through his tales as "a melancholy melody of longing and loss: a Salingeresque sense of adolescent alienation and confusion, combined with an acute awareness of the randomness of life and the difficulty of making and sustaining connections."

According to Daniel Mendelsohn, writing for New York magazine, "Johnson's oh-so-slightly futuristic flights of fancy, his vaguely Blade Runner–esque visions of a cluttered, anaerobic American culture, illustrate something very real, very current: the way we must embrace the unknown, take risks, in order to give flavor and meaning to life." A strain of absurdity also runs through his work, causing it to be described as "a funky new science fiction that was part irony and part pure dread." "Teen Sniper" is about young sniper prodigy enlisted by the Palo Alto police department to suppress the disgruntled workers of Silicon Valley. "The Canadanaut" follows a remote team of Canadian weapons developers who race to beat the Russians to the moon.

== Awards and honors ==
- 1992 Swarthout Writing Award
- 2001 Kingsbury Fellowship
- 1999-2001 Stegner Fellowship
- 2002 Amazon.com Debut Writer of the Year
- 2002 New York Public Library Young Lions Award, nominee
- 2003 Barnes & Noble Discover Great New Writers series
- 2005 Scholarship from Bread Loaf
- 2005 Scholarship from Sewanee writers' conferences
- 2009 Whiting Award
- 2010 National Endowment for the Arts Fellowship
- 2010 Gina Berriault Literary Award.
- 2013 Pulitzer Prize for Fiction for The Orphan Master's Son
- 2013 Dayton Literary Peace Prize for The Orphan Master's Son.
- 2014 Sunday Times EFG Private Bank Short Story Award for "Nirvana".
- 2015 National Book Award for Fiction for Fortune Smiles
- 2016 Story Prize for Fortune Smiles

== Bibliography ==
Novels

- Parasites Like Us (2003)
- The Orphan Master's Son (2012)
- The Wayfinder (2025)

Short story collections

- Emporium (2002)
- Fortune Smiles (2015)
- "George Orwell was a Friend of Mine" in 21st Editions' The Janus Turn (2015)

Story publications

- "Interesting Facts" in Harper's Magazine
- "Hurricanes Anonymous" in Tin House
- "The Denti-Vision Satellite" in Ninth Letter
- "Cliff Gods of Acapulco" in Esquire
- "The History of Cancer" in Hayden's Ferry Review
- "Watertables" in The Missouri Review
- "The Canadanaut" in The Paris Review
- "Your Own Backyard" in The Southeast Review
- "The Death-Dealing Cassini Satellite" in New England Review
- "Teen Sniper" in Harper's Magazine
- "Trauma Plate" in The Virginia Quarterly Review and The Barcelona Review
- "Nirvana" in The Sunday Times Magazine
- "Dear Leader Dreams of Sushi" in GQ
- "The Third Mate" in Granta 116: Ten Years Later (Summer 2011)
- "Scavengers" in Granta 127: Japan (Spring 2014)
