= The Wayfinder =

2025 epic historical novel by Adam Johnson

- Author: Adam Johnson
- Language: English
- Genre: Historical fiction
- Set in: Tonga
- Publisher: MCD
- Publication date: 2025
- Awards: The Rooster -- The Morning News Tournament of Books Nominee for Longlist (2026)
- ISBN: 9780374619572

The Wayfinder is a 2025 historical epic novel by Adam Johnson set in the south Pacific during the Tu’i Tonga Empire. The characters are based on the Moriori people of Rēkohu Island. The novel is set before Western contact with Polynesians.

== Inspiration ==
Johnson was drawn to write a novel set in ancient Polynesia because of his own Native American background. His grandmother was Lakota, but he had not met her, and was compelled to learn more about cultures that used oral histories. After spending time with the Maori of New Zealand, Johnson decided to write a novel about the storytelling tradition of the Polynesian people.

On the topic, he says:

Because Tonga was never colonized, its language and culture are largely intact. If only the same could be said of the indigenous cultures of North America. I’m an enrolled member of South Dakota’s Cheyenne River Sioux Tribe, yet I’ve always grappled with that heritage…What is my cultural inheritance? Is there a legacy? Not a word of Sioux came down to me. Filling these silences with researched and recovered narrative is why I write.

== Title ==
The title, The Wayfinder, represents the importance of celestial navigation to the Tongan people. The practice of wayfinding can refer to navigating the open sea without tools like a compass or clock. A revival in traditional Polynesian wayfinding is being led by Nainoa Thompson.

== Principal characters ==
Kōrero, the young female protagonist who is descended from Aoteora refugees. She is chosen to save her people by leaving her home island and embarking on a sea journey, which is the premise of the novel. Her name means "story" in Maori.

== Reception ==
The Wayfinder was reviewed by The New York Times, Publishers Weekly, and The Washington Post.
