= Lydi Conklin =

American writer

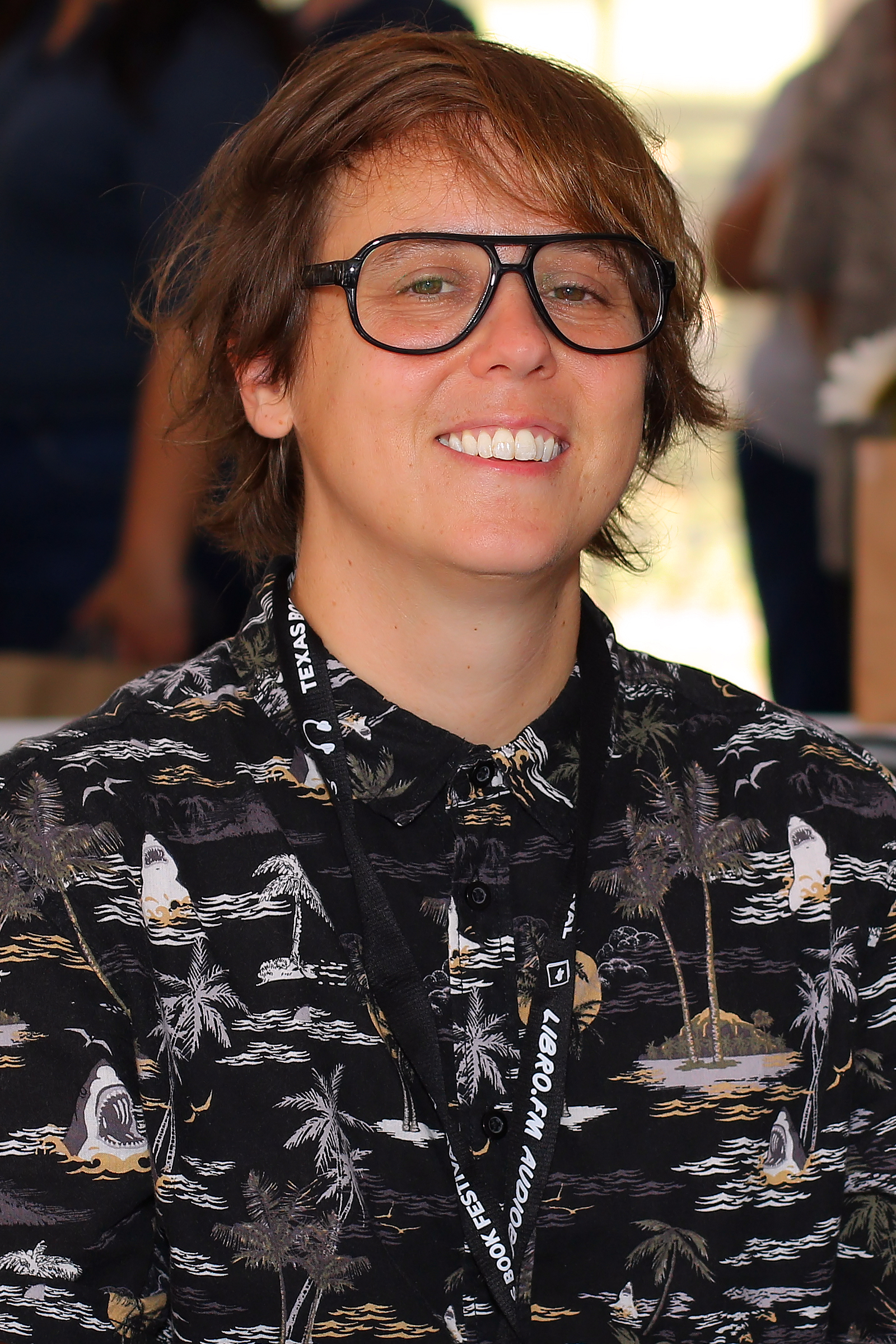
Conklin at the 2025 Texas Book Festival.

Lydi Conklin (formerly Lydia Conklin) is an American short story writer, novelist, and cartoonist.

== Education ==
Conklin received a bachelor of arts degree from Harvard College and a master of fine arts degree from the University of Wisconsin–Madison.

== Career ==
From 2015 to 2017, Conklin was a Creative Writing Fellow at Emory University, and from 2019 to 2021, they were a Stegner Fellow in Fiction at Stanford University.

Conklin has received a Stegner Fellowship (2019–2021), as well as fellowships and residencies from MacDowell (2011 and 2021), Sitka Center for Art and Ecology (2019), the Virginia Center for the Creative Arts (2018), Lighthouse Works (2015), Millay Arts (2013), the James Merrill House (2012), Harvard University (2007), Jentel, Yaddo, Brush Creek, Caldera, Djerassi, Hedgebrook, the Santa Fe Art Institute, and the Vermont Studio Center. They've also received grants and awards from the Astraea Foundation, the Puffin Foundation, the Massachusetts Cultural Council (2014), the Alliance of Artists Communities, and the Council for Wisconsin Writers.

Conklin has received four Pushcart Prizes, as well as a Rona Jaffe Writer's Award (2018) and the Larry and Eleanor Sternig Short Fiction Award (2011).

Conklin was the Helen Zell Visiting Professor in Fiction at the University of Michigan in 2021-2022. In 2022, they served as a judge for the Third Coast's Fiction Contest.

Conklin is currently Assistant Professor of Fiction in the Department of English at Vanderbilt University

== Selected texts ==
=== Rainbow, Rainbow (2022) ===
Rainbow, Rainbow, published on May 31, 2022 by Catapult, on June 9, 2022 by Scribner UK, and in 2023 by Simon and Shuster, is a collection of short stories.

TIME has named Rainbow, Rainbow one of "The 21 Most Anticipated Books of 2022." The book has also landed on "most anticipated" lists from LGBTQ Reads and Electric Literature. Library Journal has also included it in a "must read" list.

=== Songs of No Provenance (2025) ===
Songs of No Provenance, Conklin's first novel, was published June 3, 2025, by Catapult.

Chicago Review of Books, named Songs of No Provenance one of "12 Must-Read Books of June 2025." The book was also included in "most anticipated" lists from LGBTQ Reads, Our Culture Magazine and Literary Hub.

== Publications ==
=== Books ===
- Rainbow, Rainbow, published May 31, 2022
- Songs of No Provenance, published June 3, 2025

=== Cartoons ===
- "Gum Preservation," published on Everyday Genius (2013)
- "Pinprick," published in Drunken Boat (2021)

==== Narrative Magazine (2009–2019) ====
The following comics were published in Narrative Magazine.

- "Diet" (Winter 2009)
- "Rat Finance" (Spring 2009)
- "Tapeworm" (Fall 2009)
- "4th Grade Blogs" (Winter 2010)
- "Trees" (Fall 2010)
- "Ant Picnic" (Spring 2011)
- "Apple" (Fall 2011)
- "Raccoon Crime Scene" (Winter 2012)
- "Hot Dog" (Fall 2012)
- "Reading Comprehension" (Winter 2013)
- "Traveling" (Spring 2013)
- "Your Place or My Parents?" (Spring 2013)
- "Kimmy" (Winter 2014)
- "Email Me" (Winter 2014)
- "GPS Pajamas" (Spring 2014)
- "Peacock Envy" (Winter 2015)
- "Possum Theater" (Spring 2015)
- "Rabbit Pregnancy" (Fall 2015)
- "Eyeliner," in Volume 2016–03, Winter 2016)
- "Can He Say Hi?" (Fall 2016)
- "Cooler" (Winter 2019)
- "Foods That Only Sound Delicious" (Spring 2019)

==== Lesbian Cattle Dogs (2018–2020) ====
The following comics were all published to The Believer and Lenny Letter:

- "Adventures of 'Lesbian Cattle Dogs'" (December 27, 2018)
- "Lesbian Cattle Dogs Eat Dinner" (January 11, 2019)
- "Lesbian Cattle Dogs Help Ruffles" (February 14, 2019)
- "Lesbian Cattle Dogs Discuss a Big Issue" (March 12, 2019)
- "Lesbian Cattle Dogs are Cleared for Marriage by the Supreme Court" (April 4, 2019)
- "Lesbian Cattle Dogs Stroll Through Memories" (May 9, 2019)
- "Lesbian Cattle Dogs Have a Nice Meat Dinner" (June 26, 2019)
- "Lesbian Cattle Dogs See a Puppy" (July 2, 2019)
- "Lesbian Cattle Dogs Discuss Cuddling" (December 11, 2019)
- "Lesbian Cattle Dogs Welcome a Houseguest" (December 30, 2019)
- "Lesbian Cattle Dogs See Adelaide" (January 24, 2020)
- "Lesbian Cattle Dogs Have Tea with Adelaide" (February 24, 2020)

==== Animals in a Bad Situation (2018–2019) ====
The following comics were all published to Popula:

- "Sad Yak" (October 25, 2018)
- "My Old, Old Egg" (November 15, 2018)
- "You Only Get Married Once" (November 27, 2018)
- "Guinea Pigs Reach for the Stars" (January 9, 2019)
- "Big Changes" (January 17, 2019)
- "Our Little Talk" (February 19, 2019)

=== Short stories ===
- "By the Wayside," published in The Minnesota Review (2009)
- "Contributors," published in The Minnesota Review (2009)
- "Bear With Me," published in Narrative Magazine (2010)
- "Some Form of Kindness," published in The L Magazine (2011)
- "Friendly Crossroads," published in The Masters Review
- "Pioneer," published in The Southern Review (Winter 2014) and reprinted in Chapter House Journal
- "Counselor of My Heart," published in The Southern Review (Winter 2016)
- "Mrs. Sadness," published in Michigan Quarterly Review (Summer 2017)
- "The Battle of the Four Seasons," published in Tin House (Summer 2017)
- "Come On, Come Here, Talk to Me," published in Hunger Mountain Review (March 2019)
- "Laramie Time," published in American Short Stories (November 2020)
- "Rainbow Rainbow," published in The Paris Review (Summer 2021)
- "Goodnight Baby," published in The Baffler (September 2021)
- "Sun Prairie Events," published in Virginia Quarterly Review (Winter 2021)
