= Poetry Northwest =

American poetry magazine

- Editor: Aaron Barrell and Erin Malone
- Categories: Poetry
- Frequency: Biannual
- Founder: Errol Pritchard
- Founded: 1959
- First issue: Summer 1959; 66 years ago
- Country: United States
- Based in: Everett, Washington
- Language: English
- Website: www.poetrynw.org
- ISSN: 0032-2113

Poetry Northwest was founded as a quarterly, poetry-only journal in 1959 by Errol Pritchard, with Carolyn Kizer, Richard Hugo, Edith Shiffert and Nelson Bentley as co-editors. The first issue was 32 pages and included the work of Richmond Lattimore, May Swenson, Philip Larkin, James Wright, and William Stafford.

During the magazine's four decades, it gained an international reputation for publishing some of the best poetry by established and up-and-coming poets in the United States, Britain, and beyond including Stanley Kunitz, Thom Gunn, Philip Larkin, May Swenson, Theodore Roethke, John Berryman, Czesław Miłosz, Harold Pinter, Joyce Carol Oates, Raymond Carver, Robert Pinsky, Annie Dillard, Richard Wilbur, Jorie Graham, Michael S. Harper, James Dickey, Mary Oliver, Wendell Berry and Anne Sexton.

In 1963, Poetry Northwest became a publication of the University of Washington. In 1964, Kizer became the sole editor of the magazine and would hold that post until 1966 when she resigned to become the Literature Director at the National Endowment for the Arts. David Wagoner assumed the role of editor, a position he would hold for 36 years.

In 2002, after several years of dire financial circumstances, Poetry Northwest — at the time one of the longest-running poetry-only publications in the country — temporarily ceased publication.

In 2005, the University of Washington appointed poet David Biespiel as the magazine's new editor, with the agreement that the editorial offices of the magazine would relocate to the Attic Institute in Portland, Oregon. The new series resumed publication in March 2006 and immediately re-established its reputation as one of the most important and lively poetry magazines in the United States.

In 2010, David Biespiel stepped down as editor and poet Kevin Craft was appointed the sixth editor in the magazine's history. The editorial offices subsequently moved to Everett Community College in Everett, Washington, north of Seattle. Kevin Craft served as editor until 2016, when Aaron Barrell and Erin Malone were appointed co-editors.

== Theodore Roethke and Richard Hugo Prizes ==
Poetry Northwest awards two prizes each year for the best work published in its pages. Since 1963, it has awarded the Theodore Roethke Prize; since 1985, it has awarded the Richard Hugo Prize.
