= Colleen J. McElroy =

American poet (1935–2023)

- Born: October 31, 1935; St. Louis, Missouri, U.S.
- Died: December 12, 2023 (aged 88); Seattle, Washington, U.S.
- Education: Kansas State University
- Writing career
- Language: English
- Notable work: Sidewalk Games
- Notable awards: American Book Award

Colleen J. McElroy (October 31, 1935, in St. Louis, Missouri – December 12, 2023) was an American poet, short story writer, editor, and memoirist.

== Life ==
She graduated from Kansas State University (1958) and from the University of Washington with a Ph.D. (1973). She was a Professor Emeritus at the University of Washington, where she was the first African-American woman to serve as a full-time faculty member. From 1995 to 2006, she edited The Seattle Review, first in the role of Poetry Editor, then as Editor-in-Chief. She lived in Seattle, Washington, until her death in December 2023.

== Awards ==
- 1978 awarded the NEA Creative Writing Fellowship for Poetry
- 1985 American Book Award
- 1988 Fulbright Creative Writing Fellowship, which took her to Yugoslavia
- 1991 awarded the NEA Creative Writing Fellowship for Fiction
- 1992 DuPont Distinguished Scholar in Residence
- 1991 Rockefeller Fellowship to the Bellagio Center in Lake Como, Italy
- 1993 Fulbright Creative Writing Fellowship, which took her to Madagascar.

== Works ==
=== Poetry ===
==== Poems ====
- Sidewalk Games
- Webs and Weeds
- Out Here Even Crows Commit Suicide
- Lothar's Wife

==== Poetry Collections ====
- Music From Home: selected poems
- Winters Without Snow
- Lie and Say You Love Me
- Looking for a Country Under Its Original Name
- Queen of the Ebony Isles
- Bone Flames: Poems
- What Madness Brought Me Here
- Travelling Music
- Sleeping with the Moon
- Here I Throw Down My Heart
- Blood Memory

=== Memoirs ===
- A Long Way from St. Louie
- Over the Lip of the World: Among the Storytellers of Madagascar

=== Short stories ===
- Driving under the cardboard pines and other stories
- Jesus and Fat Tuesday: and other short stories

=== Anthologies ===
- Best American Poetry 2001
- Oxford Anthology of African American Literature

=== Ploughshares ===
- While Poets Are Watching
- Caution: This Woman Brakes for Memories
- Paris Subway Tango
- Crossing the Rubicon at Seventy
- Furlough
