= H. T. Kirby-Smith =

American poet

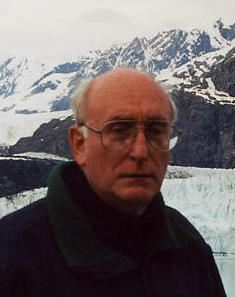

H.T. or Tom Kirby-Smith (born 1938) is an American author and poet.

== Life ==
H.T. Kirby-Smith grew up on the Cumberland Plateau, in Sewanee, Tennessee. He received his B.A. from Sewanee an M.A. from Harvard and held a Wallace Stegner Fellowship at Stanford, where he studied with Yvor Winters. He was also a Fulbright scholar in Dijon, France. He taught at the University of North Carolina at Greensboro for many years, where he was also one of the founding editors of the Greensboro Review. He has published several books including a guide to U.S. observatories, a book on the philosopher George Santayana, a book that examines free verse poetry and one on the emergence of poetry from music. His poetry and essays have been published in the Southern Review, the Sewanee Review, the Virginia Quarterly Review, Shenandoah, Poetry, the Mountain Goat, the Southern Poetry Review, Ploughshares, and the Hudson Review and he has served on the board of editors of Versification. His chapbook of poems, The Musical Constellations, was published by Unicorn Press in the fall of 2007. Among his former students is Claudia Emerson, the 2006 Pulitzer prize winner for poetry. His online poetry tutorials have been used widely by poetry teachers for almost a decade.

== Works ==
- U.S. Observatories: A Directory and Travel Guide (Van Nostrand Reinhold, 1976). ISBN 0-442-24450-9 (cloth); ISBN 0-442-24451-7 (paper)
- The Origins of Free Verse (University of Michigan Press, 1996). ISBN 0-472-10698-8 (cloth); ISBN 0-472-08565-4 (paper)
- A Philosophical Novelist: George Santayana and The Last Puritan (Southern Illinois University Press,1997). ISBN 0-8093-2113-0 (cloth)
- The Celestial Twins: Poetry and Music Through the Ages (University of Massachusetts Press, 1999). ISBN 1-55849-225-9 (cloth)
- The Musical Constellations (Unicorn Press, 2007). ISBN 0-87775-338-5 (cloth) ISBN 0-87775-339-3 (paper)
- Tutorial on Poetic Prosody: Meter and Form , 2001
