= Merrill Joan Gerber =

American writer (born 1938)

- Born: March 15, 1938 (age 88); New York City, U.S.
- Education: University of Florida; Brandeis University
- Occupations: Award winning novelist Professor

Merrill Joan Gerber (born March 15, 1938) is an American writer. She is an O. Henry Award winner.

== Biography ==
Gerber was born in Brooklyn, New York, March 15, 1938. She received a bachelor's degree in English from the University of Florida in 1959, and a Masters in English from Brandeis University in 1980. Her work was an early fiction recipient of the Wallace Stegner Fellowship in Creative Writing at Stanford, where she studied under Stegner himself.

She has published more than thirty books, and is a novelist and short story writer. She has published stories in The New Yorker, The Atlantic, The American Scholar, Mademoiselle, Redbook, The Sewanee Review, Salmagundi, The Southwest Review, and many other journals. She published her first poem in The Writer at the age of eighteen and her first book of short stories, Stop Here, My Friend, at twenty-seven.

In 1986 Gerber won an O. Henry Prize. In 1993, she won the Ribalow Award from Hadassah Magazine for her novel, The Kingdom of Brooklyn. After teaching fiction writing at the California Institute of Technology for three decades, she retired in 2020. Her literary archive resides at the Yale Beinecke Rare Book Library.

Her work is known for its humor and dark subjects.

== Awards ==
- O. Henry Award
- Wallace Stegner Fellowship in Creative Writing (for fiction) from Stanford University
- Harold Ribalow Prize from Hadassah Magazine for The Kingdom of Brooklyn
- Pushcart Editors' Book Award for King of the World
- Best American Essays
- Seventeen Magazine Fiction Contest

== Books ==
=== Novels ===
- An Antique Man (Houghton Mifflin, 1967)
- Now Molly Knows (Arbor House, 1974)
- The Lady With the Moving Parts (Arbor House, 1978)
- King of the World (Pushcart Press, 1989)
- The Kingdom of Brooklyn (Longstreet Press, 1992)
- Anna in the Afterlife (Syracuse University Press, 2002)
- Glimmering Girls (University of Wisconsin Press, 2005)
- The Victory Gardens of Brooklyn (Syracuse University Press, 2007)
- The Hysterectomy Waltz (Dzanc Books, 2013)
- You Are Always Safe With Me (Dzanc Books, 2013)

=== Short stories ===
- Stop Here, My Friend (Houghton Mifflin, 1965)
- Honeymoon (University of Illinois Press, 1985)
- Chattering Man: Stories and a Novella (Longstreet Press, 1991)
- This Old Heart of Mine: The Best of Merrill Joan Gerber’s Redbook Stories (Longstreet Press, 1993)
- Anna in Chains (Syracuse University Press, 1998)
- This Is a Voice From Your Past: New and Selected Stories (Ontario Review Press, 2005)
- Someone Should Know This Story (Sagging Meniscus Press, 2006)

=== Young adult ===
- Please Don’t Kiss Me Now (Dial, 1981)
- Name a Star for Me (Viking, 1983)
- I’m Kissing as Fast as I Can (Fawcett Juniper, 1985)
- The Summer of My Indian Prince (Ballantine, 1986)
- Also Known as Sadzia! The Belly Dancer! (Harper & Row, 1987)
- Marry Me Tomorrow (Ballantine, 1987)
- Even Pretty Girls Cry at Night (Crosswinds, 1988)
- I’d Rather Think About Robby (Harper & Row, 1989)
- Handsome as Anything (Scholastic, 1990)

=== Memoirs & nonfiction ===
- Old Mother, Little Cat: A Writer's Reflections on her Kitten, Her Aged Mother, and Life (Longstreet Press, 1995)
- Botticelli Blue Skies: An American in Florence (University of Wisconsin Press, 2002)
- Gut Feelings: A Writer's Truths and Minute Inventions (University of Wisconsin Press, 2003)
- Beauty and the Breast: A Tale of Breast Cancer, Love and Friendship (Coffeetown Press, 2016)
- Revelation at the Food Bank: Essays (Sagging Meniscus Press, 2023)
