= Keith Scribner =

American novelist

Keith Scribner is an American novelist, short-story writer, screenwriter, essayist, and educator. His third novel, The Oregon Experiment, was published by Alfred A. Knopf (Random House) in June 2011.

He is a professor of English at Oregon State University, where he teaches in the School of Writing, Literature, and Film.

Scribner received his A.B. from Vassar College and was a Wallace Stegner Fellow at Stanford University, where he later taught as a Jones Lecturer. He has received fellowships from Oregon State University's Center for the Humanities. His first novel, The GoodLife, was included in the annual New York Times "Notable Books" list for the year 2000, and a Barnes & Noble "Discover Great New Writers" selection.

== Books ==
- The GoodLife (1999)
- Miracle Girl (2004)
- The Oregon Experiment (2011)
- Old Newgate Road (2019)
