= Solmaz Sharif =

Iranian-American poet (born 1983)

- سولماز شریف
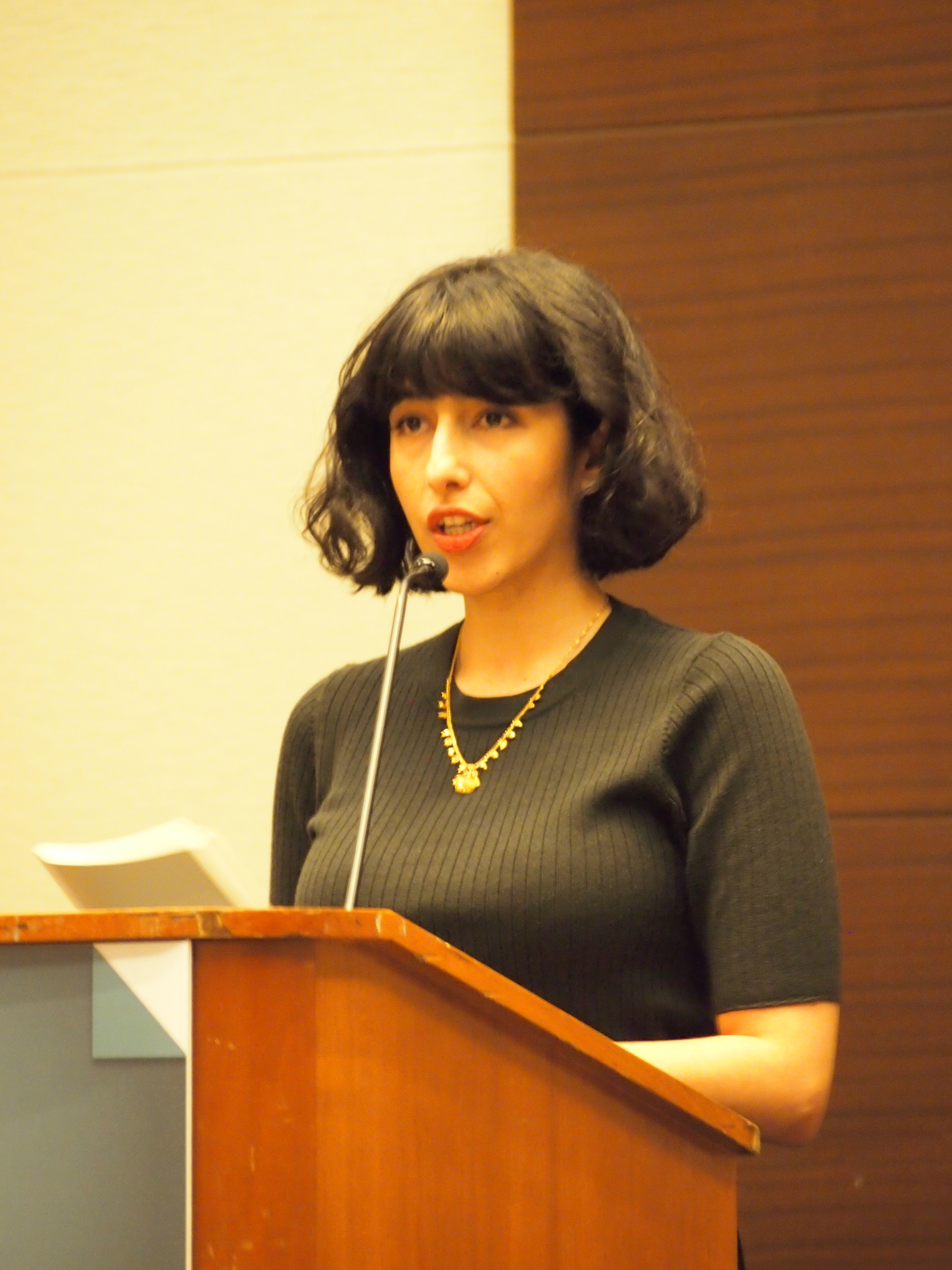
- Sharif reading at AWP 2017
- Born: 1983 (age 42–43); Istanbul, Turkey
- Citizenship: United States
- Education: University of California, Berkeley (BA); New York University (MFA)
- Occupations: Poet, academic
- Writing career
- Language: English
- Genre: Poetry
- Notable works: Look; Customs: Poems
- Notable awards: Finalist, National Book Award for Poetry (2016) (Look); American Book Award (2017) (Look)
- Website: solmazsharif.com

Solmaz Sharif (Persian: سولماز شریف; born 1983) is an Iranian-American poet. Her debut poetry collection, Look, was a finalist for the 2016 National Book Award for Poetry. She is an Associate Professor (Shirley Shenker Chair) in the Department of English at the University of California, Berkeley.

== Early life and education ==
Sharif was born in Istanbul, Turkey, as her parents were in the process of emigrating from Iran to the United States; her parents had studied in the US during the 1970s but had returned to Iran during the Iranian Revolution. Newborn Sharif and her family settled first in Texas, where her father finished his studies; the family moved again a few years later to Birmingham, Alabama, where her mother finished her bachelor's degree. After her mother graduated the family settled in Los Angeles, California, when Sharif was 11 years old. While living in Los Angeles, Sharif was exposed to the largest Iranian population outside of Iran itself, but was ostracized by her Iranian peers upon her arrival because of her family's struggle assimilating.

At sixteen years old, Sharif attended an Iranian feminist conference, with a keynote speech by Angela Davis. Here, she discovered the phrase and label "women of color", which Davis used to refer to the audience of women before her.

Sharif received her BA degree from UC Berkeley, and her MFA degree from New York University.

== Career and recognition ==
In 2011, Sharif was among the 4 winners of the Unterberg Discovery Poetry Contest, hosted by the Unterberg Poetry Center. Sharif's 2011 win was published by the Boston Review. Sharif received a fellowship from the National Endowment for the Arts in 2013. She has also received fellowships from the Fine Arts Work Center, Stanford University, and the Poetry Foundation. Sharif won the Theodore H. Holmes '51 and Bernice Holmes National Poetry Prize. Sharif has given numerous readings around the US, including at the Bread Loaf Writers' Conference. Sharif was one of the judges for 2023 National Book Award for Poetry.

Look, Sharif’s debut collection of poetry, was a finalist for the 2016 National Book Award for Poetry, a finalist for the 2017 PEN Open Book Award, one of The New York Times Book Review's 100 Notable Books of 2016, a Publishers Weekly Best Book of 2016, a Washington Post Best Poetry Collection of 2016, one of The New Yorker‘s Books We Loved in 2016, and one of the San Francisco Chronicle‘s 100 Recommended Books of 2016.

As of 2023, Sharif teaches at the University of California, Berkeley. Previously she was an assistant professor of English at Arizona State University. Before that Sharif was a Jones Lecturer at Stanford University, where she had previously been a Stegner Fellow. She is the former managing director of the Asian American Writers' Workshop.

== Influences and themes ==
Some early influences include poems by Walt Whitman, which her mother would read to her as bedtime stories. While studying at UC Berkeley, she was part of the People for Poetry program and studied June Jordan's works, citing her as an influence. More current influences include Audre Lorde's essay, "Uses of Erotics: Erotics as Power," Hannah Weiner's Code Poems, Muriel Rukeyser's The Book of the Dead, Martha Collins’s Blue Front, and M. Nourbese Philip's Zong!.

Look, Sharif's first book, "asks us to see the ongoing costs of war as the unbearable losses of human lives and also the insidious abuses against our everyday speech." Look draws on the U.S. Department of Defense Dictionary of Military and Associated Terms, and challenges readers to confront the war's effects on language.

== Reception ==
Look was reviewed favorably by The Los Angeles Review as an account of war's effects on culture and language.

Customs: Poems, her second collection, considers the contingent status of immigrant women in the US; the book received positive criticism by Kamran Javadizadeh in The New York Review of Books.

== Bibliography ==
=== Poetry collections ===
- Look: Poems. Graywolf Press, 2016. ISBN 9781555977443
- Customs: Poems. Graywolf Press, 2022. ISBN 9781644450796

=== Short publications ===
==== Print ====
- "My Father's Shoes" in A World Between: Poems, Short Stories, and Essays by Iranian-Americans
- "Your Style" in Spaces Between Us
- "Suitcases" in The Forbidden
- Three poems in Jubilat
- Two poems in Gulf Coast
- "Break-up" in Black Warrior Review
- "Personal Effects" in The Kenyon Review

==== Online ====
- "Drone" at Witness
- "Special Events for Homeland Security" and "dear intelligence journal" at Sink Review
- "Suitcases" and "Theater" at PBS's Tehran Bureau
- "Reaching Guantanamo" at Paperbag
- "lay" at DIAGRAM
- "Safe House" at Boston Review
- "Look" at PEN America
- "Perception Management: An Abridged List of Operations" at The New Republic
- "Vulnerability Study" at Poetry
- "Desired Appreciation" at The Kenyon Review
- "Exile Elegy" at Literary Hub
- "Civilization Spurns the Leopard" and "Force Visibility" at Granta
- "Social Skills Training" at BuzzFeed READER
- "Patronage" at The Yale Review

== Awards ==
- 2012–2014: Stegner Fellowship
- 2014: Ruth Lilly and Dorothy Sargent Rosenberg Poetry Fellowship
- 2014: Rona Jaffe Foundation Writers' Award
- 2017: PEN Center USA Literary Award for Poetry for Look
- 2017: American Book Award for Look
