= Maria Hummel =

American writer

Maria Hummel is an American writer. Her poetry collection, House and Fire, was winner of the 2013 APR/Hickman First Book Prize. She has written five novels: Goldenseal (Counterpoint, 2024), Lesson in Red (Counterpoint, 2021), Still Lives (Counterpoint, 2018), Motherland (Counterpoint, 2014) and Wilderness Run (St. Martin's, 2003).

Still Lives was the August 2018 pick for the Reese Witherspoon x Hello Sunshine book club. Paula L. Woods (Los Angeles Times) called the book "a stunning achievement for a writer who perfectly captures an outsider’s ambivalence about the city’s pluses and minuses, and most notably its sensational crimes and the dark angels we make of its victims."

Publishers Weekly gave Hummel's novel, Motherland, a starred review and wrote that "Fear, grief, and the will to survive fuse in this beautiful novel about the inner life of a German family in the final months of World War II...." People wrote that Motherland is "searing and honest, her book illuminates the reality of war away from the front lines ... with a compassion and depth of understanding that will touch your heart.

Hummel was a Wallace Stegner fellow from 2005 to 2007 at Stanford University, and a Jones Lecturer there from 2009 to 2016. Since 2016, she has taught in the English department at the University of Vermont.

== Works ==
- Wilderness Run, St Martin's Press, 2002, ISBN 978-0-312-28757-3
- Motherland, Counterpoint, 2014, ISBN 978-1-61902-237-9
- Still Lives, Counterpoint, 2018, ISBN 978-1-61902-111-2
- Lesson in Red, Counterpoint, 2021, ISBN 978-1-64009-431-4
- Goldenseal, Counterpoint, 2024, ISBN 978-1-64009-606-6
