= Tom Barbash =

American writer, educator, and critic

- Occupations: Author, writer, and educator
- Notable work: The Last Good Chance: A Novel(2002); Dakota Winters: A Novel (2018)

Tom Barbash is an American author of fiction and nonfiction, as well as an educator and critic.

== Career ==
=== Writer and literary critic ===
Barbash is the author of the novels Dakota Winters and The Last Good Chance, a collection of short stories Stay Up With Me, and the bestselling nonfiction work On Top of the World: Cantor Fitzgerald, Howard Lutnick & 9/11: A Story of Loss & Renewal. His fiction has been published in Tin House, Story, The Virginia Quarterly Review and The Indiana Review. His criticism has appeared in the New York Times and the San Francisco Chronicle.

He was formerly a reporter for the Syracuse Post-Standard, an experience that helped to shape his novel The Last Good Chance.

=== Teaching ===
Barbash taught at Stanford University, where he was a Stegner Fellow, and now teaches novel writing, short fiction, and nonfiction in the MFA Program in Writing at the California College of the Arts in San Francisco. Barbash has held fellowships from the MacDowell Colony, Yaddo, The James Michener Foundation, and the National Endowment for the Arts.

== Other activities ==
Barbash has served as host for onstage events for The Commonwealth Club, Litquake, BookPassage, and the Lannan Foundation.

== Honors ==
- Stegner Fellowship, Stanford University
- MacDowell Colony Fellow
- California Book Award for First Fiction (2002)
- James Michener Award (2002)
- Nelson Algren Award for Short Fiction
- Recipient, National Endowment of the Arts grant in fiction

== Selected works ==
- The Last Good Chance: A Novel, Picador (2002) ISBN 978-0312287962
- On Top of the World: Cantor Fitzgerald, Howard Lutnick, & 9/11: A Story of Loss & Renewal, Harper (2003) ISBN 978-0060510299
- Stay Up With Me, Ecco (2013) ISBN 978-0062258120
- Dakota Winters: A Novel, Ecco (2018)

== Personal life ==
Barbash grew up in New York City and attended Haverford College. As of 2019 Barbash was living in the San Francisco Bay Area with his wife and son.
