= Dana Kletter =

American musician and writer (born 1959)

- Born: October 21, 1959 (age 67); Baltimore, Maryland, U.S.
- Origin: New York, North Carolina
- Genres: Alternative rock, hardcore punk
- Occupations: Musician, writer
- Instruments: Vocals, piano
- Years active: 1985–present

Dana Kletter (born October 21, 1959) is an American musician and writer.

== Early life and education ==
Kletter and her twin sister Karen were born in Baltimore, Maryland and raised in New York. Dana began playing piano at age four. She attended American University in Washington, D.C. where she studied piano with Alan Mandel. She left music school and submerged herself in the DC Hardcore punk rock scene at its apex, in the early 1980s. There she met the friends who would become part of her professional musical life.

== Career ==
=== blackgirls ===
Dana moved to Raleigh, North Carolina in 1985 and formed blackgirls, described by the Chicago Reader as a "dark art-folk trio," with Eugenia Lee Johnson and Hollis Brown.

The band performed for several years and released a single as part of the Evil I Do Not To Nod I Live boxset with four other North Carolina bands (including the early bands of Superchunk guitarist and Merge Records mastermind Mac McCaughan), and a five song EP, Speechless. In his Spin magazine review of Speechless, Tony Fletcher noted, "…hints of absolute greatness within, most noticeably on "Queen Anne," a ballad in which Dana Kletter's vocals lean towards the sultry peaks of Nico and Marianne Faithfull…"

The band came to the attention of American auteur producer Joe Boyd (Nick Drake, Sandy Denny, Fairport Convention, Pink Floyd, REM). Boyd signed blackgirls to his European-based Hannibal Records label and Mammoth Records of Chapel Hill, North Carolina became their American label.

Boyd produced two full-length blackgirls LPs, Procedure in 1989 and Happy in 1991. The records were a critical success and the band toured regularly and performed on NPR's Mountain Stage, BBC-Radio 4-Woman's Hour. However internal problems caused the group to disband in 1992.

=== Dish ===
Kletter went on to form the four piece alternative rock band Dish, "An intriguing mix of guitar-driven garage-rock and more mannered, piano-based pop introspection…". Dish recorded Mabel Sagittarius with producer Mitch Easter (REM), released on Engine/Crypt Records in 1994.

The band signed to Interscope Records in 1994, and recorded Boneyard Beach at Ardent Studios in Memphis, produced by John Agnello (Breeders, Drive By Truckers, Hold Steady). Interscope Vice President, Tom Whalley, told Billboard magazine that "the high quality of songwriting in Dish and the sound of Dana's voice are two things that set this band apart."

But Interscope did little to promote the band, and after a number of frustrating years, Kletter dissolved Dish.

=== Solo projects ===
In 1997, Kletter reunited with Joe Boyd, signed with Hannibal/Rykodisc and with her twin sister Karen composed and recorded Dear Enemy with Joe Boyd producing. Dear Enemy, released in 1998, garnered much praise on both sides of the Atlantic, from The Times ("an early contender for album of the year"), Mojo ("extraordinary and riveting"), New York Times ("The songs reveal a sensibility like nothing else in pop: private, dreamlike and heartfelt, as enigmatic and touching as Joseph Cornell's boxes"), San Francisco Chronicle ("gemlike"), but the sisters made no plans for a follow-up recording.

In 2003, Kletter set a series of children's poems to music, composing, recording, and producing Mrs. Moon, which The Guardian called "22 of the most beautiful lullabies ever" for British imprint Barefoot Books.

Kletter has sung backing vocals and played piano on Hole's Live Through This, Mike Johnson's Year of Mondays, Michael Hurley's Sweetkorn The Hold Steady's Boys and Girls in America, and on other recordings by Linda Thompson, Angels of Epistemology, Damon and Naomi (ex-Galaxie 500) and Hobex. She is a frequent collaborator with and featured on recordings by former Magnetic Fields’ singer LD Beghtol and with various bands including Flare Acoustic Arts League and LD & the New Criticism. Her songs have been covered by the band Smoke and are featured in the independent documentary Benjamin Smoke.

=== Writing ===
Kletter began writing for magazines and journals, her articles, reviews, essays, and stories appear in The Sun, Michigan Quarterly Review, The Independent Weekly, San Francisco Chronicle, Boston Phoenix and Fiction Writers Review. Her review of Joe Boyd's memoir "White Bicycles" was a PopMatters selection for Best Music Scribing Awards 2007 and received an honorable mention in DaCapo's Best Music Writing 2008

Kletter now concentrates her energies on writing. At the University of Michigan she won Hopwood Awards for short fiction and novel. In 2010 she was awarded a Stegner Fellowship at Stanford University. In 2012 she was awarded the Jones Lectureship in Fiction. She currently teaches at Stanford.
