= The Orphan Master's Son =

2012 novel by Adam Johnson

- Hardcover edition
- Author: Adam Johnson
- Language: English
- Genre: Fiction
- Publisher: Random House
- Publication date: 2012
- Publication place: United States
- Media type: Print, e-book, audiobook
- Pages: 443 pp.
- ISBN: 978-0812992793

The Orphan Master's Son is a 2012 novel by the American author Adam Johnson. It deals with intertwined propaganda, identity, and state power themes in North Korea. The novel was awarded the 2013 Pulitzer Prize for Fiction.

== Characters ==
- Pak Jun Do: Protagonist – An orphan and model citizen who struggles through life in North Korea.
- Commander Ga: A North Korean hero and rival of Kim Jong-il.
- Sun Moon: Ga's wife and famous North Korean actress.
- Kim Jong-il (the Dear Leader): North Korean dictator.
- Interrogator for the North Korean state
- Comrade Buc: An official in the North Korean government. He helps Commander Ga through some of his journey.
- Mongnan: An old woman who befriends and helps Pak Jun Do through a challenging time in his life.

== Plot ==
=== Part 1: The Biography of Jun Do ===
Pak Jun Do is raised in a North Korean state orphanage, serving as leader and decision-maker to the other children but always deferring to his father, the orphanage's master. When he is fourteen, the children are conscripted into military service, often sent to fight in underground tunnels because, as orphans, they are considered low-class citizens and expendable. Jun Do becomes a proficient fighter and is eventually conscripted as a kidnapper of Japanese citizens. Despite occasional feelings of guilt, particularly when a Japanese woman accidentally dies during an abduction, Jun Do never questions his work and follows every order; as a reward, he is taught to speak and read English, greatly increasing his value as a citizen.

Following his military service, he is made a signal operator on a fishing boat, intercepting and translating radio transmissions. He grows fond of his fellow crew members and is fascinated with everything he hears, particularly two American girls attempting to row across the Pacific Ocean. However, transmissions from the International Space Station cause both him and the boat's second mate to realize that much of what their leaders have told them about the outside world is a lie. When the second mate becomes disillusioned and defects, the crew concocts a dramatic cover story, including Jun Do being bitten and nearly killed by a shark. After being brutally interrogated upon returning, Jun Do is declared a national hero for the alleged incident.

Due to his newfound fame, he is made part of a diplomatic delegation traveling to America, attempting to recover technology North Korea claims the Americans have stolen (it is later revealed the North Koreans themselves stole it from the Japanese before the Americans intercepted and confiscated it). Jun Do becomes acquainted with a Texas senator and Wanda, a government agent who appears sympathetic and provides him with a means of covertly contacting her. The negotiations break down when the senator, who assumes Jun Do is the true leader of the group masquerading as a figurehead, is angered by the subterfuge and refuses to meet any of their demands. Upon returning to North Korea, Jun Do and the other delegates are tricked into entering a prison mine as punishment for their failure; after that, they "cease to exist officially."

=== Part 2: The Confessions of Commander Ga ===
An unnamed interrogator for the North Korean state has been tasked with investigating national hero Commander Ga Chol Chun, who has been arrested for killing his wife – the famous actress Sun Moon – and their children. The interrogator, who compiles biographies of prisoners as a by-product of interrogation, is intrigued by Ga, who refuses to talk and is seemingly able to withstand any form of torture.

It is soon revealed that "Ga" is Jun Do, who killed the real Ga during a confrontation in the prison mine. Ga was a political rival to the Dear Leader, Kim Jong-il, who also covets Sun Moon; as such, Jun Do's assumption of Ga's identity goes largely ignored, and he is made the "replacement husband" of Sun Moon. At first, Sun Moon forces him to live in the dirt cellar under the house, but slowly accepts him as her "husband" and her children's "father." Having been enamored with the image of Sun Moon for years, Jun Do is initially disgusted by the actual woman, who is self-absorbed and disdainful of the common people. Gradually, he understands that she has resigned to a life almost completely controlled by the Dear Leader; he has sabotaged her film career in retaliation for deflecting his advances. She also lived in fear of the real Ga; the novel suggests that he was a brutal sadist who only married her to spite Kim. Jun Do often questions her acting career and loyalty to the regime; though she is devoted to acting, her faith in North Korea is less resolute, intertwined with her growing contempt for the Dear Leader. After watching Casablanca, she realizes how much of her life has been spent making propaganda with little of the artistic value she prizes, and makes "Ga" promise to help her and the children escape with him.

The Dear Leader reveals to "Commander Ga" that he has captured one of the American rower girls and plans to use her as a bargaining chip to recover the confiscated Japanese technology, with which they intend to bolster their development of nuclear power. However, he intends to humiliate the Americans by taking the technology and refusing to return the girl. Kim also plans to have "Ga" killed once the negotiations succeed to have Sun Moon for himself. Sensing an opportunity, Jun Do contacts Wanda and begins to plan.

An American delegation, which includes the Texas senator and Wanda, arrives to retrieve the rower girl and are given an elaborate performance by Kim and Sun Moon. While the Dear Leader is distracted by the delegation, Jun Do smuggles Sun Moon and the children aboard the American aircraft, allowing himself to be captured to ensure their escape. The Dear Leader is dumbfounded by Jun Do's betrayal and has him arrested and sentenced to death. The interrogator, determined to write a factual account of Commander Ga's life, realizes an "official" version of Ga's life has already been broadcast. Realizing the interrogation is an attempt to find Sun Moon, the interrogator attempts to brainwash "Ga" and himself at the same time using a device similar to electroshock therapy; however, Ga takes control of the machine and uses it to commit suicide. The novel ends with the "official" version of Sun Moon's escape – "Ga" dies in a fantastical attempt to save her from being kidnapped by the Americans and proclaims him a martyr to be revered forever.

== Structure and style ==
Johnson said this book began as a short story called The Best North Korean Short Story of 2005. The book has three narrators: a third-person account, the propaganda version of Commander Ga and Sun Moon's story, which is projected across the country by loudspeakers, and a first-person account by an interrogator seeking to write a Biography of Commander Ga.

== Critical reception ==
In The New York Times, Michiko Kakutani called it "a daring and remarkable novel, a novel that not only opens a frightening window on the mysterious kingdom of North Korea but one that also excavates the very meaning of love and sacrifice." Writing in the Wall Street Journal, Sam Sacks said “stylistic panache, technical daring, moral weight and an uncanny sense of the current moment—combine in Adam Johnson's 'The Orphan Master's Son', the single best work of fiction published in 2012.”

M. Francis Wolff, in her review for The New Inquiry, called the book "one of those rare works of high ambition that follow through on all of its promises... it examines both the Orwellian horrors of life in the DPRK and the voyeurism of Western media." David Ignatius’ review in The Washington Post called the novel “an audacious act of imagination.” In the New York Times, Christopher R. Beha called it “an ingeniously plotted adventure that feels much shorter than its roughly 450 pages and offers the reader a tremendous amount of fun,” but complained that the “[propaganda] interludes are fine exercises in dark wit, but in the context of a novel that seeks to portray a country’s suffering, they’re unconvincing.” On April 15, 2013, the novel won the Pulitzer Prize for Fiction.

== Awards and honors ==
- 2012 National Book Critics Circle Award, finalist
- 2013 The Morning News Tournament of Books, winner
- 2013 Pulitzer Prize for Fiction, winner
- 2013 Dayton Literary Peace Prize, winner fiction
- 2013 ALA Notable lists American Library Association Notable Book Award.
- 2013 California Book Award, gold medal
