= The Seattle Review =

- Editor-in-chief: Andrew Feld
- Categories: Literary magazine
- First issue: 1977; 48 years ago
- Company: University of Washington
- Country: United States
- Language: English
- Website: http://depts.washington.edu/seaview/index.html
- ISSN: 0147-6629

The Seattle Review is a literary magazine established in 1977 by Donna Gerstenberger and Nelson Bentley. It is based at the University of Washington. Work that has previously appeared in the magazine has been short-listed for the Best American Short Stories and the Best American Essays on multiple occasions.

Gerstenberger was the first editor-in-chief, while Charles R. Johnson was the first fiction editor, and Nelson Bentley the first poetry editor. Between 1995 and 2006, Colleen J. McElroy was first poetry editor, then editor-in-chief. In 2006, Andrew Feld succeeded her.

== See also ==
- List of literary magazines
