= Peter Campion (poet) =

American poet

- Born: 1976 (age 49–50)
- Citizenship: American
- Education: Dartmouth College (B.A.); Boston University (M.A.)
- Occupations: Poet, professor
- Writing career
- Genre: Poetry
- Notable awards: Guggenheim Fellowship

Peter Campion (born 1976) is an American poet.

He graduated from Dartmouth College with a BA, and from Boston University with an MA. He taught at Washington College, Ashland University, and Auburn University. He currently teaches at University of Minnesota and heads the Department of Creative Writing there.

His work has appeared in AGNI, ArtNews, The Boston Globe, Modern Painters, The New York Times, The New Republic, Poetry, Slate, and The Yale Review. He won a Levis Reading Prize, for The Lions.

He was a Stegner Fellow and Jones Lecturer at Stanford University, a Theodore Morrison Fellow at the Bread Loaf Writers' Conference, and a Guggenheim Fellow. He won a Pushcart Prize, and Joseph Brodsky Rome Prize from the American Academy of Arts and Letters,

For five years, he edited the journal Literary Imagination, published by Oxford University Press, before turning over the editorship to Saskia Hamilton and Archie Burnett. He currently edits the literary journal Great River Review, published by the University of Minnesota Creative Writing Program.

== Works ==
- Other People. University of Chicago Press. 2005. ISBN 978-0-226-09274-4.
- The Lions. University of Chicago Press. 2009. ISBN 978-0-226-09310-9.
- El Dorado. University of Chicago Press. 2013. ISBN 978-022-607-725-3.
- Radical as Reality Form and Freedom in American Poetry. University of Chicago Press. 2019. ISBN 978-022-666-337-1.
- One Summer Evening at the Falls. University of Chicago Press. 2021. ISBN 9780226737256.
