= Hayden's Ferry Review =

American literary magazine

- Editor-in-chief: Chelsea Hickok
- Categories: Literary magazine
- Frequency: Biannual
- Publisher: Arizona State University
- Founded: 1986
- Country: United States
- Language: English
- Website: haydensferryreview.com
- ISSN: 0887-5170
- OCLC: 13295749

Hayden's Ferry Review is a literary magazine published biannually by Arizona State University (ASU). The magazine was established in 1986 and is headquartered in the Virginia G. Piper Center for Creative Writing at ASU. It also manages a blog with news, information, and reviews about current events in literature and publishing.

== See also ==
- List of literary magazines
