= Edgar Bowers =

American poet

Edgar Bowers (/ˈbaʊ.ərz/; March 2, 1924 – February 4, 2000) was an American poet who won the Bollingen Prize in Poetry in 1989 and two Guggenheim fellowships. In selecting Mr. Bowers, the judges cited his 1973 work, Living Together: New and Selected Poems, saying that it "cemented Mr. Bowers's reputation as a poet of enduring work." Harold Bloom declared Bowers one of the 20th century’s masters and included his work Living Together: New and Selected Poems in his list of works constituting the Western Canon.

== Biography ==
Bowers was born in Rome, Georgia, in 1924. During World War II, he joined the military and worked in counter-intelligence against Germany, which would later inform much of his writing. He was stationed for a year at Berchtesgaden, Hitler’s retreat in the Alps.

He graduated from the University of North Carolina at Chapel Hill in 1950 and after the war, he earned his MA and PhD in English literature from Stanford University. He wrote five collections of poetry, including For Louis Pasteur (1990), The Astronomers (1965) and The Form of Loss (1956). He taught English at the University of California, Santa Barbara for most of his career.

In Bowers's obituary, the English poet Clive Wilmer wrote, "The title poem of his 1990 collection, For Louis Pasteur, announces his key loyalties. He confessed to celebrating every year the birthdays of three heroes: Pasteur, Mozart and Paul Valéry, all of whom suggest admiration for the life of the mind lived at its highest pitch—a concern for science and its social uses, and a love of art that is elegant, cerebral and orderly."

Another aspect of Bowers is highlighted by Thom Gunn on the back of Bowers's Collected Poems: "Bowers started with youthful stoicism, but the feeling is now governed by an increasing acceptance of the physical world." That 'physical world' encompasses sex and love which are refracted through his restrained and lapidary lines. The effect of this contrast is striking: at once balanced and engaged; detached but acutely aware of sensual satisfactions."

Bowers's style owes much to the artistic ethos of Yvor Winters, under whom Bowers studied at Stanford. The poetry of his first two volumes reflects the austere dedication to formal precision that marked the thinking of Winters and J. V. Cunningham. He often wrote in rhyme, but also produced blank verse in the English language. He wrote very little (his Collected Poems weighs in at 168 pages).

Bowers retired in 1991 and died of non-Hodgkins lymphoma at his home in San Francisco on February 4, 2000, the day after his companion, James Davis, died. In 2003, UCLA hosted a conference and exhibit in Bowers’s honor.

== Publications ==
- The Form of Loss (Alan Swallow, 1956)
- The Astronomers (Alan Swallow, 1965)
- Living Together (David R. Godine, 1973)
- For Louis Pasteur (Princeton University Press, 1989)
- Collected Poems (Alfred A. Knopf, 1997)
