= Stegner Fellowship =

Stanford University two-year creative writing program

The Stegner Fellowship program is a two-year creative writing fellowship at Stanford University. The award is named after American Wallace Stegner (1909–1993), a historian, novelist, short story writer, environmentalist, and Stanford faculty member who founded the university's creative writing program.

Ten fellowships are awarded every year, five in fiction and five in poetry. The recipients do not need a degree to receive the fellowships, though many fellows already hold the terminal M.F.A. degree in creative writing. A workshop-based program, no degree is awarded after the two-year fellowship. Prior to 1990, many fellows also enrolled in Stanford's now-defunct M.A. program in creative writing.

Stegner fellows receive a stipend of $75,000 per year, as well as health insurance and their tuition fee for Stanford. Fellows are required to live close enough to Stanford to be able to attend all workshops, as well as other department-related readings and events.

== History ==
Stegner founded the Stanford creative writing department and fellowship program in 1946. Initial funding was supplied by Dr. E. H. Jones, brother of the chair of the Stanford English Department, Richard Foster Jones. Initially the fellowship was for three writing fellows per year, many of whom were World War II veterans returning home from overseas. In 1973, then-director John L'Heureux expanded the program to include eight fiction writers and eight poets per year. In 1992, the program expanded again to ten fiction writers and ten poets each year.

== Faculty ==
The current poetry faculty for the program consists of A. Van Jordan, Aracelis Girmay, and Patrick Phillips. The current fiction faculty for the program consists of Adam Johnson, Chang-Rae Lee, and Molly Antopol. Louise Glück taught five workshops in poetry between 2015 and 2022 before her death in 2023.

Other notable writers often serve as guest instructors for a quarter as part of other endowed lectureships. Recent visiting writers include Heather McHugh, Nobel Laureate J. M. Coetzee, Bharati Mukherjee, Robert Pinsky, Colm Toibin, Li-Young Lee and, just before his death in 2004, Thom Gunn. Notable previous long-term faculty include Eavan Boland, Kenneth Fields, W. S. Di Piero and Denise Levertov in poetry; and John L'Heureux, Nancy Packer, and Tobias Wolff in fiction.

== Notable Stegner Fellows ==
- Edward Abbey
- Gregory Abbott
- Aria Aber
- Adedayo Agarau
- Aamina Ahmad
- Molly Antopol
- James Arthur
- Talvikki Ansel
- Ken Babbs
- Tom Barbash
- Peter S. Beagle
- Frank Bergon
- Wendell Berry
- Jamel Brinkley
- David Biespiel
- Edgar Bowers
- Geoffrey Brock
- Jason Brown
- NoViolet Bulawayo
- Bo Caldwell
- Kai Carlson-Wee
- Raymond Carver
- Samantha Chang
- Marilyn Chin
- Eddie Chuculate
- Evan Connell
- Lydi Conklin (Note: As Lydia Conklin)
- Madeleine Cravens
- Max Crawford
- Alison Hawthorne Deming
- Donald Davie
- Catherine Davis
- Stephen Dixon
- Harriet Doerr
- Geri Doran
- Kyle Edwards
- Safia Elhillo
- Stephen Elliott
- Eugene England
- Peter Everwine
- Jonathan Escoffery
- Chanda Feldman
- Ernest Gaines
- Allan Gurganus
- Merrill Joan Gerber
- Reginald Gibbons
- Charles Gullans
- Thom Gunn
- James Baker Hall
- Ron Hansen
- Vicki Hearne
- William Hjortsberg
- Alice Hoffman
- Richie Hofmann
- Skip Horack
- James D. Houston
- Maria Hummel
- Scott Hutchins
- Adam Johnson
- Donald Justice
- Christopher Kempf
- Ken Kesey
- Suji Kwock Kim
- Chuck Kinder
- H. T. Kirby-Smith
- William Kittredge
- Dana Kletter
- Edgar Kunz
- Philip Levine
- Anthony Marra
- Tom W. Mayer
- Ed McClanahan
- Michael McGriff
- Thomas McGuane
- James McMichael
- Larry McMurtry
- Joanne Meschery
- Robert Mezey
- Ottessa Moshfegh
- Hieu Minh Nguyen
- Gurney Norman
- Jenny Offill
- Raymond Oliver
- Tillie Olsen
- Julie Orringer
- Nancy Packer
- ZZ Packer
- Charlotte Painter
- Robert Pinsky
- Eric Puchner
- Stephen Ratcliffe
- Chip Rawlins
- Rita Mae Reese
- Peter Rock
- David Roderick
- William Pitt Root
- Benjamin Alire Sáenz
- Sheila Schwartz
- Keith Scribner
- Vikram Seth
- Charif Shanahan
- Alan Shapiro
- Solmaz Sharif
- Akhil Sharma
- Maggie Shipstead
- Tracy K. Smith
- Monica Sok
- Timothy Steele
- Alan Stephens
- Robert Stone
- Rod Taylor
- Lysley Tenorio
- Maria Thomas
- Ruchika Tomar
- Justin Torres
- Paul Tran
- Scott Turow
- Kirstin Valdez Quade
- Robert Vasquez
- Emily Warn
- Jesmyn Ward
- Christian Wiman
- Sari Wilson
- Tobias Wolff
- Greg Wrenn
- Mark Wunderlich
- David Yezzi
- Monica Youn
- Al Young
- Kevin Young
- David Vann
- Javier Zamora
