= National Book Critics Circle Award for Criticism =

Annual American literary award for cultural criticism

- Awarded for: "the finest books and reviews published in English"
- Sponsored by: National Book Critics Circle
- First award: 1975
- Website: https://www.bookcritics.org/awards

The National Book Critics Circle Award for Criticism, established in 1975, is an annual American literary award presented by the National Book Critics Circle (NBCC) to promote "the finest books and reviews published in English." Awards are presented annually to books published in the U.S. during the preceding calendar year in six categories: Fiction, Nonfiction, Poetry, Memoir/Autobiography, Biography, and Criticism.

Books previously published in English are not eligible, such as re-issues and paperback editions. They do consider "translations, short story and essay collections, self published books, and any titles that fall under the general categories."

The judges are the volunteer directors of the NBCC who are 24 members serving rotating three-year terms, with eight elected annually by the voting members, namely "professional book review editors and book reviewers." Winners of the awards are announced each year at the NBCC awards ceremony in conjunction with the yearly membership meeting, which takes place in March.

== Recipients ==
National Book Critics Circle Award for Criticism winners and finalists
Year	Author	Title	Result	Ref.
1975	Paul Fussell	The Great War and Modern Memory	Winner	
1976	Bruno Bettelheim	The Uses of Enchantment: The Meaning and Importance of Fairy Tales	Winner	
	Ada Louise Huxtable	Kicked a Building Lately?		
	Steven Marcus	Representations: Essays on Literature and Society		
	Charles Rosen	Arnold Schoenberg		
	E.B. White, ed. by Dorothy Lobrano Guth	Letters of E.B. White		
1977	Susan Sontag	On Photography	Winner	
	Arlene Croce	Afterimages		
	Morris Dickstein	Gates of Eden: American Culture in the Sixties		
	Richard Poirier	Robert Frost: The Work of Knowing		
	Gore Vidal	Matters of Fact and of Fiction: Essays, 1973-1976		
1978	Meyer Schapiro	Modern Art: 19th and 20th Centuries (Selected Papers, Volume 2)	Winner	
	Malcolm Cowley	And I Worked at the Writer's Trade: Chapters of Literary History, 1918-1978		
	Eudora Welty	The Eye of the Story: Selected Essays and Reviews		
	Edward W. Said	Orientalism		
	William H. Gass	The World Within the Word: Essays		
1979	Elaine Pagels	The Gnostic Gospels	Winner	
	Frances FitzGerald	America Revised: History Schoolbooks in the Twentieth Century		
	Richard Gilman	Decadence: The Strange Life of an Epithet		
	Sandra M. Gilbert & Susan Gubar	The Madwoman in the Attic: The Woman Writer and the Nineteenth-Century Literary Imagination		
	Robert Alter with Carol Cosman	A Lion for Love: A Critical Biography of Stendhal		
1980	Helen Vendler	Part of Nature, Part of Us: Modern American Poets	Winner	
	Paul Fussell	Abroad: British Literary Traveling Between the Wars		
	R.P. Blackmur, ed. by Veronica A. Makowsky	Henry Adams		
	Vladimir Nabokov, ed. by Fredson Bowers	Lectures on Literature		
	Barbara Novak	Nature and Culture: American Landscape Painting, 1825-1875		
1981	Virgil Thomson	A Virgil Thomson Reader	Winner	
	Guy Davenport	The Geography of the Imagination: Forty Essays		
	Martin Gardner	Science: Good, Bad and Bogus		
	Edward Mendelson	Early Auden		
	Thomas G. Bergin	Boccaccio		
1982	Gore Vidal	The Second American Revolution and Other Essays	Winner	
1983	John Updike	Hugging the Shore: Essays and Criticism	Winner	
1984	Robert Hass	Twentieth Century Pleasures: Prose on Poetry	Winner	
1985	William H. Gass	Habitations of the Word: Essays	Winner	
1986	Joseph Brodsky	Less Than One: Selected Essays	Winner	
1987	Edwin Denby	Dance Writings	Winner	
1988	Clifford Geertz	Works and Lives: The Anthropologist as Author	Winner	
1989	John Clive	Not by Fact Alone: Essays on the Writing and Reading of History	Winner	
1990	Arthur C. Danto	Encounters and Reflections: Art in the Historical Present	Winner	
1991	Lawrence L. Langer	Holocaust Testimonies: The Ruins of Memory	Winner	
1992	Garry Wills	Lincoln at Gettysburg: The Words That Remade America	Winner	
1993	John Dizikes	Opera in America: A Cultural History	Winner	
1994	Gerald Early	The Culture of Bruising: Essays on Prizefighting, Literature, and Modern American Culture	Winner	
1995	Robert Darnton	The Forbidden Best-Sellers of Pre-Revolutionary France	Winner	
1996	William H. Gass	Finding a Form	Winner	
1997	Mario Vargas Llosa	Making Waves	Winner	
1998	Gary Giddins	Visions of Jazz: The First Century	Winner	
1999	Jorge Luis Borges	Selected Non-Fictions	Winner	
2000	Cynthia Ozick	Quarrel & Quandary	Winner	
2001	Martin Amis	The War Against Cliché: Essays and Reviews, 1971–2000	Winner	
2002	William H. Gass	Tests of Time	Winner	
2003	Rebecca Solnit	River of Shadows: Eadweard Muybridge and the Technological Wild West	Winner	
2003	Dagoberto Gilb	Gritos	Finalist	
2003	Nick Hornby	Songbook	Finalist	
2003	Ross King	Michelangelo & the Popes Ceiling	Finalist	
2003	Susan Sontag	Regarding the Pain of Others	Finalist	
2004	Patrick Neate	Where You're At: Notes From the Frontline of a Hip-Hop Planet	Winner	
2004	Richard Howard	Paper Trail: Selected Prose, 1965-2003	Finalist	
2004	Graham Robb	Strangers: Homosexual Love in the 19th Century	Finalist	
2004	Craig Seligman	Sontag & Kael: Opposites Attract Me	Finalist	
2004	James Wood	The Irresponsible Self: On Laughter and the Novel	Finalist	
2005	William Logan	The Undiscovered Country: Poetry in the Age of Tin	Winner	
2005	Hal Crowther	Gather at the River: Notes From the Post-Millennial South	Finalist	
2005	Arthur Danto	Unnatural Wonders	Finalist	
2005	John Updike	Still Looking: Essays on American Art	Finalist	
2005	Eliot Weinberger	What Happened Here: Bush Chronicles	Finalist	
2006	Lawrence Weschler	Everything That Rises: A Book of Convergences	Winner	
2006	Bruce Bawer	While Europe Slept: How Radical Islam Is Destroying the West From Within	Finalist	
2006	Frederick Crews	Follies of the Wise: Dissenting Essays	Finalist	
2006	Daniel Dennett	Breaking the Spell: Religion As a Natural Phenomenon	Finalist	
2006	Lia Purpura	On Looking: Essays	Finalist	
2007	Alex Ross	The Rest Is Noise: Listening to the Twentieth Century	Winner	
2007	Ben Ratliff	Coltrane: The Story of a Sound	Finalist	
2007	Julia Alvarez	Once Upon a Quinceañera	Finalist	
2007	Susan Faludi	The Terror Dream	Finalist	
2007	Joan Acocella	Twenty-Eight Artists and Two Saints	Finalist	
2008	Seth Lerer	Children's Literature: A Readers' History: Reader's History from Aesop to Harry Potter	Winner	
2008	Richard Brody	Everything is Cinema: The Working Life of Jean-Luc Godard	Finalist	
2008	Joel L. Kraemer	Maimonides: The Life and World of One Of Civilization's Greatest Minds	Finalist	
2008	Reginald Shepard	Orpheus in the Bronx: Essays on Identity, Politics, and the Freedom of Poetry	Finalist	
2008	Vivian Gornick	The Men in My Life	Finalist	
2009	Eula Biss	Notes from No Man's Land: American Essays	Winner	
2009	Stephen Burt	Close Calls with Nonsense: Reading New Poetry	Finalist	
2009	Morris Dickstein	Dancing in the Dark: A Cultural History of the Great Depression	Finalist	
2009	David Hajdu	Heroes and Villains: Essays on Music, Movies, Comics, and Culture	Finalist	
2009	Greg Milner	Perfecting Sound Forever: An Aural History of Recorded Music	Finalist	
2010	Clare Cavanagh	Lyric Poetry and Modern Politics: Russia, Poland, and the West	Winner	
2010	Susie Linfield	The Cruel Radiance	Finalist	
2010	Elif Batuman	The Possessed: Adventures with Russian Books and the People Who Read Them	Finalist	
2010	Terry Castle	The Professor and Other Writings	Finalist	
2010	Ander Monson	Vanishing Point: Not a Memoir	Finalist	
2011	Geoff Dyer	Otherwise Known as the Human Condition: Selected Essays and Reviews	Winner	
2011	David Bellos	Is That a Fish in Your Ear?: Translation and the Meaning of Everything	Finalist	
2011	Dubravka Ugresic	Karaoke Culture: Essays	Finalist	
2011	Ellen Willis	Out of the Vinyl Deeps: Ellen Willis on Rock Music	Finalist	
2011	Jonathan Lethem	The Ecstasy of Influence: Nonfictions, Etc.	Finalist	
2012	Marina Warner	Stranger Magic: Charmed States and the Arabian Nights	Winner	
2012	Mary Ruefle	Madness, Rack, and Honey	Finalist	
2012	Paul Elie	Reinventing Bach	Finalist	
2012	Kevin Young	The Grey Album: On the Blackness of Blackness	Finalist	
2012	Daniel Mendelsohn	Waiting for the Barbarians: Essays from the Classics to Pop Culture	Finalist	
2013	Franco Moretti	Distant Reading	Winner	
2013	Mary Beard	Confronting the Classics: Traditions, Adventures and Innovations	Finalist	
2013	Janet Malcolm	Forty-One False Starts: Essays on Artists and Writers	Finalist	
2013	Jonathan Franzen with Paul Reitter and Daniel Kehlman	The Kraus Project: Essays by Karl Kraus	Finalist	
2013	Hilton Als	White Girls	Finalist	
2014	Ellen Willis, edited by Nona Willis Aronowitz	The Essential Ellen Willis	Winner	
2014	Claudia Rankine	Citizen: An American Lyric	Finalist	
2014	Vikram Chandra	Geek Sublime: The Beauty of Code, the Code of Beauty	Finalist	
2014	Eula Biss	On Immunity: An Inoculation	Finalist	
2014	Lynne Tillman	What Would Lynne Tillman Do?	Finalist	
2015	Maggie Nelson	The Argonauts	Winner	
2015	Ta-Nehisi Coates	Between the World and Me	Finalist	
2015	Leo Damrosch	Eternity's Sunrise: The Imaginative World of William Blake	Finalist	
2015	Colm Tóibín	On Elizabeth Bishop	Finalist	
2015	James Wood	The Nearest Thing to Life	Finalist	
2016	Carol Anderson	White Rage: The Unspoken Truth of Our Racial Divide	Winner	
2016	Mark Greif	Against Everything: Essays	Finalist	
2016	Peter Orner	Am I Alone Here?: Notes on Living to Read and Reading to Live	Finalist	
2016	Alice Kaplan	Looking for The Stranger: Albert Camus and the Life of a Literary Classic	Finalist	
2016	Olivia Laing	The Lonely City: Adventures in the Art of Being Alone	Finalist	
2017	Carina Chocano	You Play the Girl: On Playboy Bunnies, Stepford Wives, Train Wrecks, & Other Mixed Messages	Winner	
2017	Kevin Young	Bunk: The Rise of Hoaxes, Humbug, Plagiarists, Phonies, Post-Facts and Fake News	Finalist	
2017	Camille Dungy	Guidebook to Relative Strangers: Journeys into Race, Motherhood, and History	Finalist	
2017	Valeria Luiselli	Tell Me How It Ends: An Essay in Forty Questions	Finalist	
2017	Edwidge Danticat	The Art of Death: Writing the Final Story	Finalist	
2018	Zadie Smith	Feel Free: Essays	Winner	
2018	Robert Christgau	Is It Still Good to Ya?: Fifty Years of Rock Criticism, 1967-2017	Finalist	
2018	Lacy M. Johnson	The Reckonings: Essays	Finalist	
2018	Terrance Hayes	To Float in the Space Between: A Life and Work in Conversation with the Life and Work of Etheridge Knight	Finalist	
2018	Stephen Greenblatt	Tyrant: Shakespeare on Politics	Finalist	
2019	Saidiya Hartman	Wayward Lives, Beautiful Experiments: Intimate Stories of Social Upheaval	Winner	
2019	Maria Tumarkin	Axiomatic	Finalist	
2019	Lydia Davis	Essays One	Finalist	
2019	Hanif Abdurraqib	Go Ahead in the Rain	Finalist	
2019	Peter Schjeldahl	Hot, Cold, Heavy, Light, 100 Art Writings 1988-2018	Finalist	
2020	Nicole R. Fleetwood	Marking Time: Art in the Age of Mass Incarceration	Winner	
2020	Wendy A. Woloson	Crap: A History of Cheap Stuff in America	Finalist	
2020	Cristina Rivera Garza	Grieving: Dispatches from a Wounded Country	Finalist	
2020	Namwali Serpell	Stranger Faces	Finalist	
2020	Vivian Gornick	Unfinished Business: Notes of a Chronic Re-Reader	Finalist	
2021	Melissa Febos	Girlhood	Winner	
2021	Mark McGurl	Everything and Less: The Novel in the Age of Amazon	Finalist	
2021	Amia Srinivasan	The Right To Sex: Feminism in the Twenty-First Century	Finalist	
2021	Jesse McCarthy	Who Will Pay Reparations on My Soul?: Essays	Finalist	
2021	Jenny Diski	Why Didn't You Just Do What You Were Told?: Essays	Finalist	
2022	Timothy Bewes	Free Indirect: The Novel in a Postfictional Age	Winner	
2022	Rachel Aviv	Strangers to Ourselves: Unsettled Minds and the Stories That Make Us	Finalist	
2022	Peter Brooks	Seduced by Story: The Use and Abuse of Narrative	Finalist	
2022	Margo Jefferson	Constructing a Nervous System: A Memoir	Finalist	
2022	Alia Trabucco Zerán (trans. by Sophie Hughes)	When Women Kill: Four Crimes Retold	Finalist	
2023	Tina Post	Deadpan: The Aesthetics of Black Inexpression	Winner	
2023	Grace Lavery	Pleasure and Efficacy: Of Pen Names, Cover Versions, and Other Trans Techniques	Finalist	
2023	Naomi Klein	Doppelganger: A Trip into the Mirror World	Finalist	
2023	Myriam Gurba	Creep: Accusations and Confessions	Finalist	
2023	Nicholas Dames	The Chapter: A Segmented History from Antiquity to the Twenty-First Century	Finalist	
2024	Hanif Abdurraqib	There's Always This Year: On Basketball and Ascension	Winner	
2024	Legacy Russell	Black Meme: A History of the Images that Make Us	Finalist	
2024	Jesse McCarthy	The Blue Period: Black Writing in the Early Cold War	Finalist	
2024	Claire Bishop	Disordered Attention: How We Look at Art and Performance Today	Finalist	
2024	Marianne Brooker	Intervals	Finalist	
2025	Quinn Slobodian	Hayek's Bastards: Race, Gold, IQ, and the Capitalism of the Far Right	Winner	
2025	Yoko Tawada (trans. by Lisa Hofmann-Kuroda)	Exophony: Voyages Outside the Mother Tongue	Finalist	
2025	Joanna Pocock	Greyhound	Finalist	
2025	Omar El Akkad	One Day, Everyone Will Have Always Been Against This	Finalist	
2025	Viet Thanh Nguyen	To Save and to Destroy: Writing as an Other	Finalist	
