= 1984 Nobel Prize in Literature =

- Jaroslav Seifert
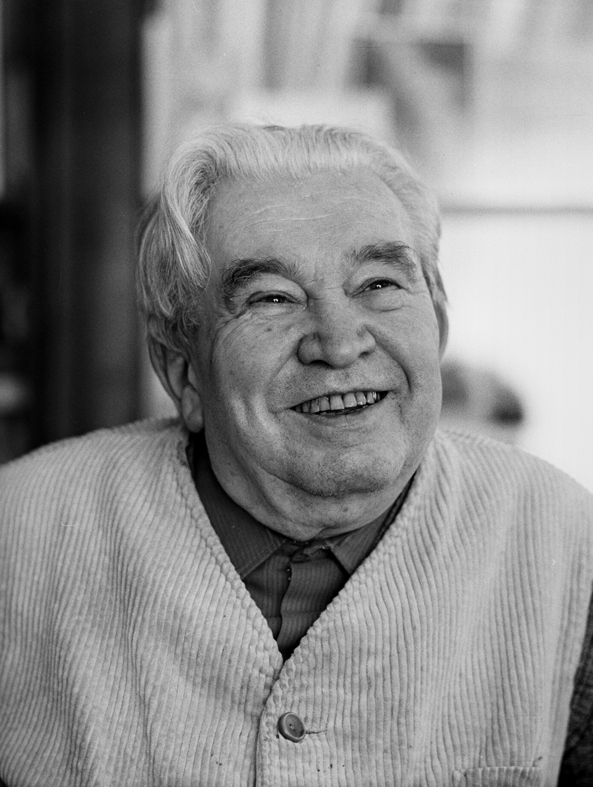
- "for his poetry which endowed with freshness, sensuality and rich inventiveness provides a liberating image of the indomitable spirit and versatility of man."
- Date: 11 October 1984 (announcement); 10 December 1984 (ceremony)
- Location: Stockholm, Sweden
- Presented by: Swedish Academy
- First award: 1901
- Website: Official website

The 1984 Nobel Prize in Literature was awarded to the Czech writer Jaroslav Seifert (1901–1986) "for his poetry which endowed with freshness, sensuality and rich inventiveness provides a liberating image of the indomitable spirit and versatility of man."

== Laureate ==
Jaroslav Seifert was a journalist and poet. His first book of poems published in 1920 reflected his youthful expectations of communism, but he was later less enchanted with that system of government and his poetry became more lyrical with the history and other aspects of Czechoslovakia as a common theme. In 1977 he was among the first to sign the petition Charter 77. Seifert published about 30 volumes of poetry as well as journalism, children's literature and a memoir.

== Reactions ==
Frequently mentioned favourites to win the 1984 Nobel Prize in Literature were Jorge Luis Borges, Graham Greene, Günter Grass (awarded in 1999), Claude Simon (awarded in 1985), Marguerite Yourcenar, Octavio Paz (awarded in 1990), Joseph Brodsky (awarded in 1987), Wole Soyinka (awarded in 1986), Yaşar Kemal, Max Frisch and René Char.

Jaroslav Seifert was regarded a National poet in his home country, but although he had achieved some international recognition was little known elsewhere. The 83 year old and hospitalised Seifert was said to be overjoyed to hear that he had been awarded the Nobel Prize in Literature. The official Czechoslovak press agency CTK praised Seifert for his "positive attitude to man's struggle for social justice."

== Award ceremony speech ==
At the award ceremony in Stockholm on 10 December 1984, Lars Gyllensten, permanent secretary of the Swedish Academy said:

Today, many people think of Jaroslav Seifert as the very incarnation of the Czechoslovakian poet. He represents freedom, zest and creativity and is looked upon as this generation’s bearer of the rich culture and traditions of this country. His method is to depict and praise those things in life and the other world that are not governed by dogmas and dictates, political or otherwise. Through words he paints a world other than the one various authorities and their henchmen threaten to squeeze dry and leave destitute. He praises a Prague that is blossoming and a spring that lives in the memory, in the hopes or the defiant spirit of people who refuse to conform. He praises love, and is indeed one of the truly great love-poets of our time. (...) He conjures up for us another world than that of tyranny and desolation – a world that exists both here and now, although it may be hidden from our view and bound in chains, and one that exists in our dreams and our will and our art and our indomitable spirit. His poetry is a kind of maieutics – an act of deliverance.

At the award ceremony, the prize was accepted by Jaroslav Seifert's daughter Jana Seifertova.
