= Strangers to Ourselves (book) =

2022 book by Rachel Aviv

Strangers to Ourselves: Unsettled Minds and the Stories That Make Us
- Author: Rachel Aviv
- Genre: non-fiction
- Publisher: Farrar, Straus and Giroux
- Publication date: September 13, 2022
- Pages: 288
- ISBN: 9780374600853

Strangers to Ourselves: Unsettled Minds and the Stories That Make Us is a 2022 non-fiction book by Rachel Aviv that focuses on mental illness, diagnosis, and people in extreme mental distress. It was listed among the New York Times’ "The 10 Best Books of 2022".

The book explores the personal stories of mentally ill people and the history of how mental illness has been defined and treated. As an investigative reporter, Rachel Aviv investigates the lives of six people who have diverse experiences of mental illness, including herself. She selected people who had written personal diaries and letters so that she could learn how they viewed their world. The book quotes medical and scholarly essays, legal documents, and personal and creative writings by Ray, Bapu, Naomi, Laura Delano, and Hava. Drawing on her own childhood diagnosis of anorexia nervosa, Aviv weaves her personal story into the narrative.

== Reception ==
Strangers to Ourselves was well-received by critics. In The Wall Street Journal, Elizabeth Winkler wrote, "In writing against the limits of psychiatric narratives, into the space where language has failed, Ms. Aviv paradoxically finds language for the most ineffable registers of human experience." Writing for the Washington Post, Sally Satel called it "Vivid, wrenching, and ambitiously researched."

It was one of the New York Times' Ten Best Books of the Year and the New Yorker's Best Books of 2022. It was a finalist for the 2023 National Book Critics Circle Award for Criticism.
