= 1987 Nobel Prize in Literature =

- Joseph Brodsky
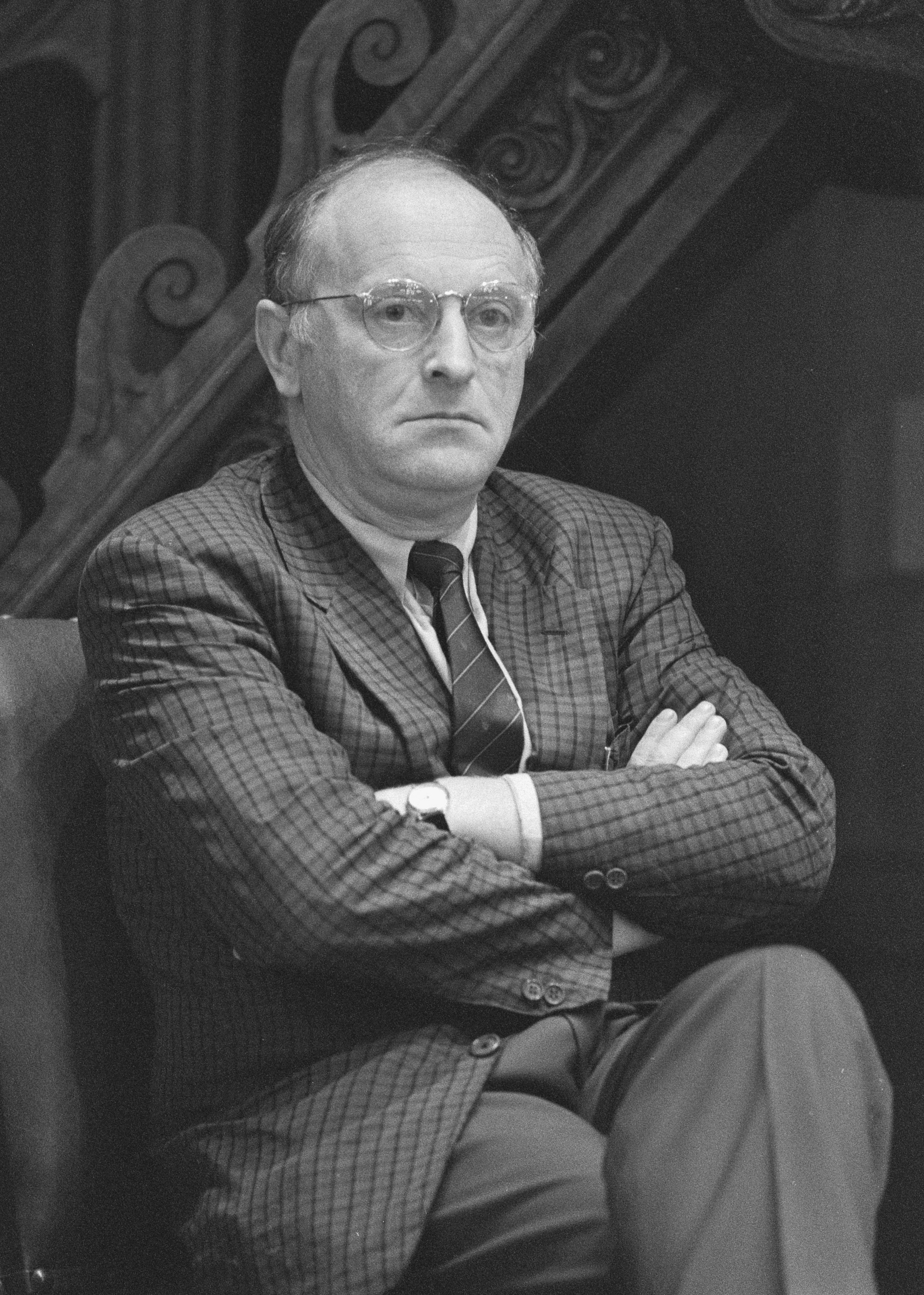
- "for an all-embracing authorship, imbued with clarity of thought and poetic intensity."
- Date: 22 October 1987 (announcement); 10 December 1987 (ceremony)
- Location: Stockholm, Sweden
- Presented by: Swedish Academy
- First award: 1901
- Website: Official website

The 1987 Nobel Prize in Literature was awarded to the Russian–American poet and essayist Joseph Brodsky (1940–1996) "for an all-embracing authorship, imbued with clarity of thought and poetic intensity."

== Laureate ==
At the age of 18, Joseph Brodsky started writing poetry. His poetry was influenced by British poets like John Donne and W. H. Auden as well as Russian predecessors like Alexander Pushkin and Boris Pasternak. Brodsky's forced exile affected his writing, both thematically and linguistically. He details how he gradually loses hair, teeth, consonants, and verbs in Chast' rechi ("A Part of Speech", 1977). The interaction between the poet and society appears frequently in his poems. According to Brodsky, literature and language are vital tools for the advancement of society and the advancement of human thought. His famous literary and autobiographical essay collection Less Than One: Selected Essays (1986) explores his fellow Russian writers like Dostoyevsky, Mandelstam, and Platonov.

== Pre-announcement speculations ==
In 1987, Joseph Brodsky was among the favorites speculated to receive the award, along with Peruvian novelist Mario Vargas Llosa (awarded in 2010), Octavio Paz (awarded in 1990) and Carlos Fuentes, both of Mexico. Other possible candidates speculated about included South African Nadine Gordimer (awarded in 1991), East German Christa Wolf, French Marguerite Yourcenar, and American Joyce Carol Oates. Artur Lundkvist, a prolific member of the Nobel Committee, described Oates as "one of the most impressive phenomena in American literature in 10 years."

== Reactions ==
The choice of Joseph Brodsky was well received. Several American professors in Russian literature celebrated Brodsky as the greatest Russian writer alive. Michael Scammell, the chairman of the department of Russian literature at Cornell University, said: "He's the best living Russian writer, bar none. He is in the great tradition of 20th-century poetry, represented by Mandelstam, Akhmatova and Pasternak", adding that Brodsky has "a truly profound and global view of the human situation. He's preoccupied with the fate of civilization in our time." "There are a small number of writers at any given moment who are going to be part of literature and he's one of them," writer and critic Susan Sontag said. "Not every great writer gets a Nobel Prize and not every Nobel Prize goes to a great writer. This is an example of the Nobel Prize going to a really serious, committed, great writer."

Reactions from the Soviet Union included a comment from Gennadi Gerasimov of the Soviet Foreign Ministry, saying "the tastes of the Nobel Prize committee are somewhat strange sometime", adding that he would have preferred V. S. Naipaul as the recipient of the award.

== Award ceremony speech ==
At the award ceremony in Stockholm on 10 December 1987, Sture Allén, permanent secretary of the Swedish Academy, said:

In the remarkable writings to which the Swedish Academy has drawn attention this year, poetry as the highest manifestation of life is a theme throughout. It is developed with a poetic brilliance combined with both intellectual beauty and linguistic mastery. (...) Style and mood alternate in this richly orchestrated poetry. Here is the profound cultural analysis in the essays side by side with the rollicking ironies in the poem History of the Twentieth Century. Yet, for Joseph Brodsky poetry, even in its mirthful moments, is deadly earnest.
