= A Planet to Win =

2019 non-fiction anthology

A Planet to Win: Why We Need a Green New Deal
- First edition
- Authors: Kate Aronoff; Alyssa Battistoni; Daniel Aldana Cohen; Thea Riofrancos
- Publisher: Verso Books
- Publication date: 12 November 2019
- Pages: 194
- ISBN: 9781788738316
- Website: versobooks.com/books/3107-a-planet-to-win

A Planet to Win: Why We Need a Green New Deal is a 2019 book arguing for the importance of a Green New Deal and describing political and societal steps to achieving one.

== Summary ==
A Planet to Win attempts to provide a solution to the stated problem that decarbonization is necessary by the end of the 2020s. Though the book describes recommended energy policies, including market internalization of carbon costs, government purchasing of oil and gas companies, and a shift to renewable energy, the authors emphasize industrial policy over energy policy. They suggest the importance of massive public works efforts, a jobs program, and a focus on workers' rights, comparing the efforts to World War II mobilization and the FDR's New Deal.

The book places importance on designating those responsible for the climate crisis. The authors highlight the broad role of the United States, the second-highest overall current emitter of greenhouse gasses and by far the highest in cumulative terms. They then narrow their focus to fossil fuel CEOs and private utility executives, suggesting the importance of

Naomi Klein writes the preface.

== Reception ==
Writing for The New York Review of Books, Eric Klinenberg notes that "the tone of the book is urgent and pragmatic. It's also refreshingly optimistic and future-oriented, filled with specific ideas.... Their portrait of a planet transformed by the [Green New Deal] is designed to spark that effort."

In his review for Foreign Policy, Quinn Slobodian says of A Planet to Win that "its optimism is inspiring....The authors’ battle-ready tone on this score breaks with the often moralistic and soul-searching mode of some of the higher-profile climate books of the last few years." Though he argues that the book at first seems "[stay] too close to the United States" in its focus, the last chapter "offers an inspiring new way of thinking about global politics and organizing social movements" using "Riofrancos’s ethnographic research in Chile’s lithium fields." However, the authors "pay little attention to the alter-globalization movement of the 1990s," a historical comparison which Slobodian feels offers significant parallels to the goals and methods of the movement for the Green New Deal.
