= Solenoid (novel) =

2015 novel by Mircea Cărtărescu

- Author: Mircea Cărtărescu
- Translator: Sean Cotter
- Language: Romanian
- Genre: Literary fiction
- Publisher: Humanitas
- Publication date: 2015
- Publication place: Romania
- English publication date: 2022
- Pages: 672
- ISBN: 9789735055998

Solenoid is a 2015 novel by Mircea Cărtărescu written in the 2010s and, according to Cărtărescu, in a single draft without revision. The English translation by Sean Cotter was published in 2022.

The book tells the story of a Romanian teacher who used to be an aspiring author. It was received positively by critics and prompted comparisons to Borges and Kafka due to its absurdist plot.

== Plot ==
The novel is presented as a manuscript by an unnamed Romanian writer in the 1980s who claims he will not publish the manuscript. The novel begins with the narrator, an elementary school teacher, describing lice he got from his students. He then begins to reminisce on his life and failed career as an author.

Born in Bucharest in 1956, he suffers from paresis. After finishing his military service, he went to major in literature at a university. While there, he shared an epic poem with his peers at a writing workshop but was ridiculed for it. He later claims he is glad that he wasn't successful in publishing the work. Six distinct solenoids appear throughout the novel.

The novel's protagonist's life intentionally contrasts Cărtărescu's life. For example, the latter presented an epic poem at a workshop to acclaim whereas the former was poorly received in his attempt.

== Characters ==
- The protagonist: An unnamed Romanian schoolteacher and writer who lives in the boat-shaped house over a solenoid on Maica Domnului ("Mother of God").
- His parents: lived on Ștefan cel Mare.
- His twin: named Victor, he dies as a child.
- The other: an alternate version of the protagonist who was successful as a poet and novelist.
- Ștefana: The protagonist's ex-wife.
- Irina: A physics teacher and the narrator's lover.
- Irina: Daughter of Irina and the protagonist.
- Valeria Olaru: A "chunky and pimply" student whose bones and fingernails turned different colours and who discovers polytopes and a four-dimensional Klein bottle in a field.
- Palamar: A librarian, entomologist and holder of a copy of the Voynich manuscript, which he later gives to the protagonist.
- Nicolae Minovici: A thanatologist who hanged himself many times until almost dead. Historical character.
- Nicolae Vaschide: A Romanian psychologist, collaborator and student of Alfred Binet, dream researcher and oneiromancer. Historical character whose life is fictionalized by the narrator. Great grandfather to Florabela.
- Vasile Borescu: The school's principal.
- Agripina: Romanian teacher associated with The Writer.
- The Writer: Working on a novel for three decades, which he continually revises without ever finishing. Lives with Agripina.
- Goia: A young mathematics teacher who discovers a hidden world near the school along with the narrator.
- Caty: A chemistry teacher, involved with The Picketists sect.
- Mr. Ispas: The school's porter who is abducted, experimented on, and modified by some other beings.
- Traian: A friend from the narrator's time in the Voila sanatorium.
- Mrs. Rădulescu A history teacher who makes students wash her car and hits them with her large ring. Married to a party official.
- Mrs. Bernini: Music teacher who introduces algae as a treatment method.
- Mrs. Gionea: Physics teacher, praised for her persuasive power among colleagues.
- Madame Zarzăre: A "decrepit old lady" who is usually drunk.
- Mrs. Mototolescu and Călătorescu: Twins who are always together and teach parallel classes.
- Mrs. Spânu: "a woman-man, tall, broad-shouldered, her hair cut short, with a military gait."
- Nicu Gheară: The choir director, joker and "the school’s go-to for everything".
- Steluța Dudescu: A teacher whom Nicu claims to have slept with. Lives near the protagonist.
- Virgil: The leader of the Picketists who is crushed.
- The blond nurse at Grozovici: Very aggressive and feared.
- The nurse with no nose: Very gentle and loved by all.
- Mrs. Idoraș: the school secretary.
- Mrs. Băjenaru: Pale, wilting math teacher.
- Florabela: Beautiful and loved by all. "A firecracker: large, ruddy, full of life, gold, and freckled, she is the school’s absolute goddess." Great grand-daughter to Nicolae Vaschide.
- Mrs. Diaconu: "the fulsome and always jovial Russian teacher."
- Mr. Mikola (AKA Nicolae Borina): Inventor of the Borina solenoid. The designer of the protagonist's boat-shaped house on Maica Domnului.
- Mr. Eftene: The technical workshop teacher.
- Higena: A teacher whose "specialty was lying and manipulation".
- The Boole family: historical characters
  - George Boole: Mathematician and husband of Mary Everest.
  - Mary Everest: Mathematician and wife of George Boole.
  - Ethel Lilian Voynich: Daughter of George and Mary, wife of Wilfrid, author of The Gadfly.
  - Wilfrid Voynich: Polish rare book dealer, husband of Ethel, discoverer of the Voynich manuscript.
  - Mary Ellen Boole: Daughter of George and Mary, wife of Charles Hinton.
  - Charles Howard Hinton (AKA John Weldon): Coiner of the term tesseract, husband of Mary Ellen.
  - Alicia Boole: Daughter of George and Mary, visualizer of multi-dimensional objects.

== Critical reception ==
The novel received generally positive reviews. Writing for The New York Times, Dustin Illingworth called the novel "an instant classic of literary body horror" and praised Sean Cotter's translation. Similarly, Alta Ifland writing for The Brooklyn Rail, Will Self writing for The Nation, and Kirkus Reviews praised the novel's Kafkaesque depiction of Romania. Sara Kornfield writing for the Los Angeles Review, however, claimed that it was distinct from a Kafkaesque novel in that it's distinctly Romanian. Likewise, she criticized the classification of it as magical realism.

In the Los Angeles Review of Books, Ben Hooyman praised the book's labyrinthine nature and length, contrasting it with Borges's and Kafka's significantly shorter stories, but also wrote "there are moments when Solenoid revisits a motif too many times, or when a lull drags on a little too long". Nicholas Dames, in a favorable review for the Spring 2023 edition of n+1, called the novel "one of our young century’s landmarks of fiction".

In 2017, Solenoid was declared Book of the Year in Spain in La Vanguardia, El Periódico, and The New York Times en Español. Andrés Ibáñez called it a masterpiece in ABC Cultural; Robert Saladrigas (writing in La Vanguardia) called it Cărtărescu's most important book; Babelia (the cultural supplement of El País), called it essential reading; and El Correo called it a grand, exceptional, unforgettable book. Solenoid was explicitly mentioned when Cărtărescu won the 2022 FIL Award.

The novel won the 2022 Los Angeles Times Book Prize for fiction. The novel won the 2024 Dublin Literary Award with judge Anton Hur commenting "By turns wildly inventive, philosophical, and lyrical, with passages of great beauty, Solenoid is the work of a major European writer who is still relatively little known to English-language readers". It also appeared on the International Booker Prize 2025 Longlist with the judges stating

Solenoid is uncategorisable epic [sic] of interconnected realities, a book that seems to be about… everything. On a single page you might be flung from intimate insights into the banality of a teacher’s life to grand theoretical re-imaginings of the universe, to microscopic insights into mites, matter, love or letter-forms. It’s a mind-boggling, bravura and ceaselessly entertaining book, unlike anything else. The translation struck us as word perfect, a feat of attention to detail that transports us with total control from Communist Romania to the far sci-fi reaches of the imagination and back again.
