= Wendy A. Woloson =

American historian

Wendy A. Woloson is an American historian. She is a professor at Rutgers University–Camden, specializing in the "history of material and consumer culture, used goods markets, alternative and criminal economies, and the history of capitalism".

== Education ==
Woloson graduated from Iowa State University in 1986 with a BFA in Drawing, Painting, Printmaking and a minor in art history. In 1990, she received an MFA in Printmaking from Montana State University. In 1993, she received a MA in Popular Culture from Bowling Green State University. Her thesis was titled "In Our Homes We Must Have Industry and Sympathy: Early Twentieth-Century Advertising Recipe Booklets and American Domestic Culture". In 1999, she received her PhD in American Studies from the University of Pennsylvania. Her dissertation was "Refined Tastes: Sugar, Confectionery, and Consumers in Nineteenth-Century America" which she later published as a book in 2002.

== Career ==
For ten years, Woloson worked as the Curator of Printed Books at the Library Company of Philadelphia.

She has been a professor at Rutgers University–Camden since 2013.

== Awards and honors ==
Her book Crap: A History of Cheap Goods in America was a finalist for the 2020 National Book Critics Circle Award for Criticism.

== Books ==
- Refined Tastes Sugar, Confectionery, and Consumers in Nineteenth-Century America (The Johns Hopkins University Press, 2002).
- In Hock: Pawning in America from Independence through the Great Depression (University of Chicago Press, 2010)
- Crap: A History of Cheap Goods in America (University of Chicago Press, 2020)

=== Editor ===
- coeditor with Brian P. Luskey of the collection, Capitalism by Gaslight: Illuminating the Economy of 19th-Century America (University of Pennsylvania Press, 2015)
