= Rachel Aviv =

American writer

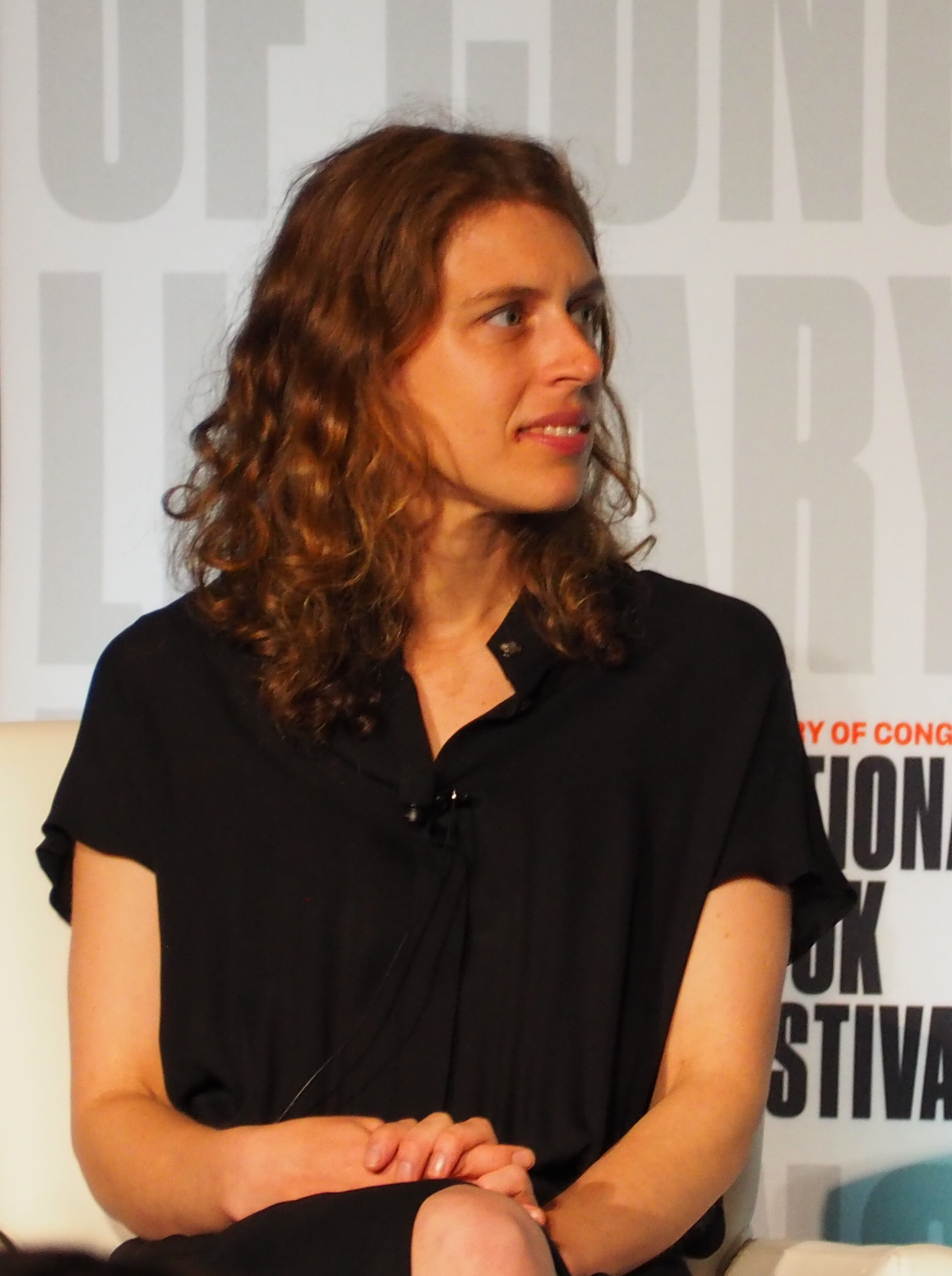
- Aviv at the 2022 National Book Festival
- Born: 1982 (ages 43-44); Detroit, Michigan, United States
- Education: Brown University (BA); Columbia University (MFA)
- Occupation: Writer
- Notable work: Strangers to Ourselves: Unsettled Minds and the Stories That Make Us (2022); You Won't Get Free of It: Stories of Mothers and Daughters (2026)
- Awards: George Folk Award Award (2024); National Magazine Award for Profile Writing (2022)

Rachel Aviv (born 1982) is an American journalist, author, and a staff writer at The New Yorker.

Her book Strangers to Ourselves: Unsettled Minds and the Stories That Make Us was published in 2022. Her sophomore essay collection, You Won't Get Free of It: Stories of Mothers and Daughters was released in 2026.

Aviv frequently writes about psychiatry and medical ethics. Tablet has referred to Aviv as "Janet Malcolm’s successor."

== Early life ==
Aviv was raised in eastern Michigan. Her parents are divorced. When she was six, she was admitted to the Children's Hospital of Michigan where she received six weeks of treatment for anorexia nervosa. She writes about the experience in the first chapter of her book Strangers to Ourselves. She was thought to be the youngest anorexia patient in the country. Her symptoms subsided after several months of treatment.

She attended the private school Cranbrook-Kingswood, where she was co-captain of the girls' tennis team. She graduated with a BA from Brown University in 2004, followed by a Master of Fine Arts in Non-Fiction Writing from Columbia University.

== Career ==
Aviv won a 2020 Whiting Foundation nonfiction grant and a 2010 Rona Jaffe Foundation Writers' Award for Nonfiction. She has investigated Teen Challenge, guardianship abuse, family courts, and the possible innocence of convicted nurse Lucy Letby. She has won a National Magazine Award and a George Polk Award. and was a finalist for the 2026 Pulitzer Prize for Feature Writing.

In 2022, her book Strangers to Ourselves: Unsettled Minds and the Stories That Make Us was published by Farrar, Straus and Giroux. Strangers to Ourselves was selected for The New York Times's "10 Best Books of 2022" list. The book was a finalist for the 2023 National Book Critics Circle Award for Criticism.

Her next book, You Won’t Get Free of It: Stories of Mothers and Daughters, was released in July 2026 through Fern Press. The book consists of seven essays covering mother-daughter dyads she'd covered throughout her career, six of which were originally published in The New Yorker.

== Bibliography ==
=== Books ===
- Aviv, Rachel (2022). Strangers to Ourselves: Unsettled Minds and the Stories that Make Us. New York: Farrar, Straus and Giroux.
- — (2026). You Won’t Get Free of It: Stories of Mothers and Daughters. Fern Press.

=== Essays and reporting ===
- Aviv, Rachel (July 25, 2016). "Captain of her soul : the philosopher Martha Nussbaum's emotions". Profiles. The New Yorker. 92 (22): 34–43. (Note: Online version is titled "The philosopher of feelings".)
- — (April 5, 2021). "Past imperfect : Elizabeth Loftus changed the meaning of memory. Now her work collides with our traumatized moment". Profiles. The New Yorker. 97 (7): 28–36, 39. (Note: Online version is titled "How Elizabeth Loftus changed the meaning of memory".)
- — (September 12, 2022). "Impaired judgment : Arica Waters believed she had been taken advantage of sexually. Why was she on trial?". A Reporter at Large. The New Yorker. 98 (28): 34–38, 40–43. (Note: Online version is titled "The victim who became the accused".)
- — (May 20, 2024). "Conviction : Lucy Letby, the most notorious nurse in Britain, was found guilty of killing seven babies. Did she do it?". A Reporter at Large. The New Yorker. 100 (13): 34–49. (Note: Online version is titled "A British nurse was found guilty of killing seven babies. Did she do it?".)
- — (December 23, 2024). "Alice Munro's Passive Voice". A Reporter at Large. The New Yorker: 24–45.
- — (August 17, 2026). "The Children a Scientist Took Home". A Reporter at Large. The New Yorker. 102 (25): 36–48.

=== Critical studies and reviews of Aviv's work ===
Strangers to Ourselves

- Anon. (June 15, 2022). "[Untitled review]". Kirkus Reviews.
- Szalai, Jennifer (2022-09-07). "In 'Strangers to Ourselves,' a Revelatory Account of Mental Illness". The New York Times.
- Anderson, Hephzibah (2022-10-11). "Strangers to Ourselves by Rachel Aviv review – rewriting the language of mental illness". The Guardian.

———————
