= Marina Basmanova =

Russian illustrator (born 1938)

Marianna "Marina" Pavlovna Basmanova (Russian: Марианна "Марина" Павловна Басманова; born 20 July 1938) is a Russian artist and book illustrator based in St. Petersburg.

== Biography ==
Basmanova was born in Leningrad in a family of artists. Both her father, Pavel Basmanov, a student of Petrov-Vodkin, and mother, Natalia Basmanova, were soviet artists and book illustrators.

She is well known as the partner of Joseph Brodsky, a Russian-American poet, from 1962 to 1972. Together, they had one son, Andrei, in 1967, but were formally never married despite several marriage proposals from Brodsky. It has been said that Brodsky 'dedicated some of the Russian language's most powerful love poetry to her'.

== Work ==
In the end of 1950's, Basmanova became the first student of Russian avant-garde painter, Vladimir Sterligov, who himself was a student of Kazimir Malevich. The first exhibition of her work was organised in 1959 in the apartment of artists Vladimir Sterligov and Tatiana Glebova. In 1960's she began working as an illustrator of children's books, several of which she has illustrated together with her mother, also an illustrator. In 1963 she did a series of portrait sketches of Anna Akhmatova, a Russian poet.
