= Muskism (book) =

2026 non-fiction book by Quinn Slobodian and Ben Tarnoff

Muskism: A Guide for the Perplexed
- Author: Quinn Slobodian and Ben Tarnoff
- Publisher: HarperCollins
- Publication date: April 21, 2026
- Pages: 272
- ISBN: 978-0-063-48432-0

Muskism: A Guide for the Perplexed is a 2026 non-fiction book by Quinn Slobodian and Ben Tarnoff. In the book, Slobodian and Tarnoff propose a description of the political and social views of Elon Musk in an ideology that they call "Muskism."

== Summary ==
One important feature the authors propose of Muskism is the influence of Apartheid South Africa, which the authors dub a "reactionary technocracy" that aimed to build a "biometric state." While Musk left South Africa for Canada as a young adult, the authors argue that some aspects of apartheid South Africa "fortress futurism" left a mark on his political thought, namely in a belief that society could be engineered through high technology and in that a vertically integrated, self-sufficient industrial model is necessary. In an interview with The New York Times, Tarnoff explained that Muskism "envisions the factory as an enclave, garrisoned against the instability of a hostile world." The authors also argue that Musk has "always been committed to a vigorous defense of hierarchy. Some humans are born to rule; others to be ruled."

The authors also touch on the influence of science fiction and popular culture on Musk's worldview. In particular, the authors cite the mecha genre that Musk was a fan of in his youth (with series such as Robotech and Transformers) and "the idea of a giant robotic suit that a human pilot, often a young male pilot, enters into and fuses with in a cybernetic integration in order to defend a civilization that is under attack by some overwhelming force." The authors note, however, that the influence of popular culture should not be overstated, arguing that it is more a practice of Silicon Valley capitalism than a determinant.

Another important feature the authors propose of Muskism is "state symbiosis" - that Muskism aims to co-opt the state instead of replacing it by rendering the state dependent on tech firms. In doing so, tech firms can offer the state "sovereignty as a service." This belief in state symbiosis, the authors argue, was marked by the intertwining of Musk's companies with the American government, particularly SpaceX and the DARPA Falcon Project during the War on Terror.

Another feature of Muskism that the authors propose is its ambivalence towards cultivating a social contract based on widespread popular consent outside of its immediate base of followers. According to Tarnoff, "if you believe, as Musk and most members of the Silicon Valley leadership class do, that 'artificial general intelligence' is around the corner, then you believe that in the very near future, most people will be thrown out of work. They will be designated as social surplus, and will no longer have the leverage to exert influence on the direction of society. In that case, you don’t need their consent."

Another feature of Muskism proposed by the authors is "financial fabulism." The authors argue that Musk has not diversified his wealth, instead concentrating it into his own companies in a manner similar to Ford, while cultivating the brand of his companies around himself as the "founder-god" (or as Musk put it, the "technoking"). Because of this, the authors argue that Musk has needed to present increasingly extravagant rhetoric and promises about future developments in order to guarantee continued funding from investors and the future of his own wealth. This fabulism also marks Musk's tendencies to both promote his promises as utopian and presenting that which he disagrees with as apocalyptic. At the same time, this extravagence allows Musk to co-opt the attention economy and erode the status of traditional media. This leads into the acquisition of Twitter by Elon Musk in 2022, which in turn had a further radicalising on Muskism as it became further enmeshed in the platform's online culture.

The authors also explore the importance of the Second presidency of Donald Trump on Muskism. In an interview with The New York Times, Tarnoff explained that "Trump has done more than any other single historical actor to supercharge Muskism." In particular, the authors cite Musk's Department of Government Efficiency and his view of governance "not as a space of deliberation but as lines of executable code."

== Critical reception ==
Publishers Weekly gave the book a starred review, praising its "searing analysis" that was "impressive and unrelenting." Kirkus Reviews described the book as "bleak but urgent." Misha Glenny of The Financial Times wrote that the "great value of Muskism is that it is brief, easy to read and yet packed with insights." Ian Hughes of University College Cork praised the book as "an essential read," saying that "the authors make a convincing case that Muskism has been possible only because our, and particularly US, culture celebrates gross inequality and derides empathy and the common good."

The Economist reviewed the book as "the inverse of Walter Isaacson's authorised biography of 2023. Despite the lack of direct access to Mr Musk, the authors provide a portrait of his psyche that is arguably more revealing." Christopher Webb of The Guardian reviewed the book as "a well-researched account of how we have arrived at a point where so many resources are concentrated in the hands of just one man," but noted that although the authors did not intend the book as a biography, it nevertheless "has a hard time pivoting completely from the biographical."

Giles Whittell of The Observer gave the book a more mixed review, saying that it was "thoughtful and illuminating, at least in parts," but that it was ultimately "too clever by half, with the authors failing to convincely ground their proposed features of Muskism, especially his behaviour in the 2020s. Matt McManus of Spelman College reviewed the book as "part critical biography, part political-economic analysis of the neoliberal era," saying it was "enlightening but ultimately limited in its approach to understanding the pathologies of the present. It would benefit from situating Musk in the broader nest of institutions and practices that have allowed him to flourish and discussing his relationship to the broader right."

== Authors ==
Quinn Slobodian is a Canadian historian, based at Boston University in the United States. Ben Tarnoff is a technology writer.

== See also ==
- Fordism
- Torment Nexus
