= Carina Chocano =

American journalist, cultural critic, and author

Carina Chocano is an American journalist, cultural critic, and author. She has worked as a film and television critic for Entertainment Weekly, Salon, and the Los Angeles Times, and as a contributing writer to The New York Times Magazine. Her essay collection You Play the Girl: On Playboy Bunnies, Stepford Wives, Train Wrecks, & Other Mixed Messages won the National Book Critics Circle Award for Criticism and was a finalist for the PEN/Diamonstein-Spielvogel Award for the Art of the Essay.

== Early life ==
Chocano was born in Chicago to Peruvian parents. During her childhood, her family lived in Chicago, New York, São Paulo, and Madrid.

== Career ==
Chocano was a film and television critic at Entertainment Weekly and Salon before working as a film critic for the Los Angeles Times. She later became a contributing writer to The New York Times Magazine. Her writing has also appeared in publications including New York, Elle, Vogue, Rolling Stone, Wired, and The New Yorker.

== You Play the Girl ==
Chocano's 2017 book You Play the Girl is a collection of essays combining memoir and cultural criticism. It examines gender roles and representations of women in film, television, literature, and popular culture. In an interview with Brooklyn Magazine, Chocano described drawing on feminist writing, philosophy, news, criticism, and personal experience in the collection.

In March 2018, the National Book Critics Circle awarded You Play the Girl its award for criticism. The book was also one of five finalists for the 2018 PEN/Diamonstein-Spielvogel Award for the Art of the Essay.

== Bibliography ==
- You Play the Girl: On Playboy Bunnies, Stepford Wives, Train Wrecks, & Other Mixed Messages (Houghton Mifflin Harcourt, 2017) ISBN 978-0-544-64896-8
