= Joshua Bennett =

American author and professor

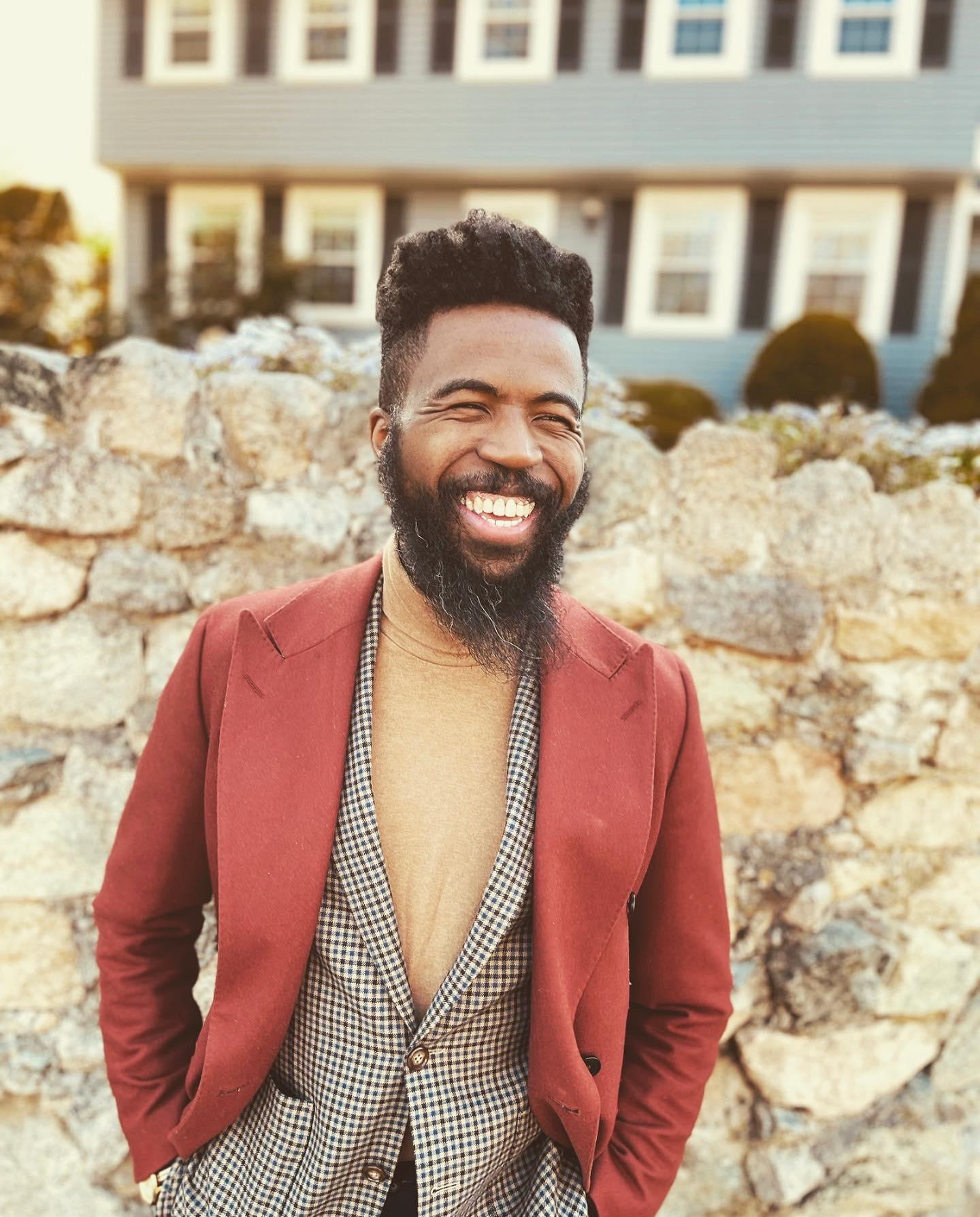
- Born: Yonkers, New York, U.S.
- Occupations: Author, professor, and artist
- Awards: Guggenheim Fellowship; Whiting Award, Poetry and Nonfiction; NEA Literature Fellowship; National Poetry Series; Marshall Scholarship

Academic background
- Education: BA in English and Africana Studies (2010); MA in Theatre and Performance Studies (2011); MA in English (2013); PhD in English (2016)
- Alma mater: University of Pennsylvania; University of Warwick; Princeton University

Academic work
- Institutions: Harvard University; Dartmouth College; MIT
- Website: www.drjoshuabennett.com

Joshua Bennett is an American author, professor, and artist. He is a Professor of Literature and Distinguished Chair of Humanities at Massachusetts Institute of Technology. His research and teaching interests include 20th and 21st century African American literature, animality studies, affect theory, black poetics, and environmental studies.

Bennett is a Guggenheim Fellow and has received fellowships from the National Endowment for the Arts, MIT, the Ford Foundation, and the Society of Fellows at Harvard University. He received the Whiting Award in 2021.

== Education ==
Bennett earned a Bachelor of Arts in both English and Africana Studies from the University of Pennsylvania in 2010. Bennett then completed an M.A. in Theatre Performance Studies at the University of Warwick in the UK, where he was a Marshall Scholar in 2011. From Princeton University, he received his M.A. and Ph.D. in English, in 2013 and 2016, respectively.

== Career ==
From 2016 to 2019, Bennett was a Junior Fellow in the Society of Fellows at Harvard University. After his time at Harvard, he joined the faculty of Dartmouth College as the Mellon Assistant Professor of English and Creative Writing. From 2021 to 2023, he was a full professor of English and Creative Writing at Dartmouth College. In 2023, he joined Massachusetts Institute of Technology as a Professor of Literature and Distinguished Chair of Humanities.

Bennett has been a visiting writer at Kent State University, Lenoir-Rhyne University and the University of Pittsburgh. He has been a visiting scholar at the Massachusetts Institute of Technology, a visiting lecturer at Chautauqua Institution and a visiting scholar at Friends Seminary in New York City.

== Works ==
Bennett has recited his original work as a performance artist at events such as the Sundance Film Festival, the NAACP Image Awards, and President Obama's Evening of Poetry and Music at The White House. His work has been published extensively, notably in The Best American Poetry, The New York Times, The Paris Review, Boston Review, The Yale Review, and elsewhere. He was featured in the HBO documentary, Brave New Voices. Together with Jesse McCarthy, he is the founding editor of a Penguin Classics book series for minor poets in the black expressive tradition, Minor Notes.

Christopher Kempf at Colorado State University described Bennett's poetry as being able to capture the many different facets of an African-American life, "a diverse body of experiences cut through with conflicting class and cultural investments." Kempf further detailed how Bennett reveals the "plasticity and performativity of identity." In Dissent Magazine, Jesse McCarthy suggested that Bennett's voice is a portion of a literary movement where politics and poetry are coming together in an unanticipated way. In another article, McCarthy mentions how Bennett is "quietly building a reputation as one of the brightest intellectual and political thinkers of a new generation."

A poem of Bennett's, "Benediction," was chosen by Tracy K. Smith to be included in The Best American Poetry anthology in 2021. On the Academy of American Poets website, Bennett describes his "Dad Poem (Ultrasound #2)", as living in between the indescribable anxiety of becoming a parent during a global pandemic and the joy of being able to see his son's heartbeat in ultrasound for the first time. Despite the distance, he felt the closeness between them, like they were together somewhere else "vibrant, and alive."

Bennett has also authored two books of poetry, namely The Sobbing School, which won the National Poetry Series and was a finalist for an NAACP Image Award, and Owed. He has written a book of literary criticism, Being Property Once Myself, which won the Williams Sanders Scarborough Prize from the Modern Language Association.

The Sobbing School was described as a "scintillating debut" by Publishers Weekly. Their review describes how Bennett put forward important questions related to the experiences of African-Americans, asking "how can one convey the enormity of black suffering without reducing black life and expression to elegy?" They further praise the collection as "sharp" and "an ode to family, friendship and culture that neither pulls punches nor withholds sentiment." The New Yorker's review of Owed details how "Themes of praise and debt pervade this rhapsodic, rigorous poetry collection, which pays homage to everyday Black experience in the U.S. . . . Bennett conjures a spirit of kinship that, illuminated by redolent imagery, borders on mythic, and boldly stakes claim to ‘some living, future / English, & everyone in it / is immortal." Salon writes that "Bennett captures the beauty of what really matters in life—the memories, youth sports, family traditions and little moments that many of us take for granted" in addition to saying that the book couldn't have come out at a better time. Ron Charles at Washington Post describes Bennett's literary criticism as "An intense and illuminating reevaluation of black literature and Western thought."

== Personal life ==
Bennett lives in Massachusetts with his family.

== Awards and honors ==
- 2013 - Associate Fellowship, Oxford Centre for Animal Ethics
- 2015 - National Poetry Series Selection
- 2015 - Porter Ogden Jacobus Fellowship
- 2015 - Josephine de Karman Fellowship
- 2016 - Society of Fellows, Harvard University
- 2017 - National Endowment for the Arts Literature Fellowship
- 2021 - William Sanders Scarborough Prize, MLA
- 2021 - Guggenheim Fellowship in American Literature
- 2021 - Whiting Award for Poetry and Nonfiction
- 2023 - Paterson Poetry Prize
- 2025 - Laurance S. Rockefeller Visiting Faculty Fellow, Princeton University

== Bibliography ==
=== Books ===
- The Sobbing School. Penguin Books/Penguin Poets. 2016. ISBN 9781101993101.
- Being Property Once Myself. Belknap Press/Harvard University Press. 2020. ISBN 9780674980303.
- Owed. Penguin Books/Penguin Poets. 2020. ISBN 9780143133858.
- The Study of Human Life. Penguin Books/Penguin Poets. 2022. ISBN 9780143136828.
- Spoken Word: A Cultural History. Knopf. 2023. ISBN 9781984897862.
- The People Can Fly: American Promise, Black Prodigies, and the Greatest Miracle of All Time. Little, Brown and Company. 2026. ISBN 9780316576024.
- We (the People of the United States). Penguin Books/Penguin Poets. 2026. ISBN 9780143138648.

=== Selected poems ===
- "On Blueness" and "Love Poem Ending with Typewriters" in Beloit Poetry Journal (2015)
- "Ode to Ankle Weights" and "Token Sings The Blues" in The Journal (2016)
- "X" and "Praise Song for the Table In The Cafeteria Where All The Black Boys Sat Together During A Block, Laughing Too Loudly" in The Kenyon Review (2017)
- "The Book of Mycah" in Poetry (2018)
- "Barber Song" and "Owed to the Plastic on your Grandmother’s Couch" in Tin House (2018)
- "America Will Be" in The Nation (2018)
- "Owed to Your Father’s Gold Chain" and "Trash" in The Kenyon Review (2019)
- "Summer Job" in Wildness (2019)
- "Reparation" in Provincetown Arts (2020)
- "Dad Poem," "Trash" and "The Hurricane Doesn’t Roar in Pentameter" in Colorado Review (2021)
- "Dad Poem" and "Dad Poem (The New Temporality)" in The Yale Review (2021)
