= Jesse McCarthy =

American essayist, cultural critic and professor

- Occupations: Essayist, cultural critic and professor

Academic background
- Education: Amherst College (BA); Princeton University (Ph.D.)

Academic work
- Discipline: English, African and African American Studies
- Institutions: Harvard University

Jesse McCarthy is an American essayist and cultural critic who is the John J. Loeb Associate Professor of the Humanities and of the Social Sciences at Harvard University.

== Publications ==
=== Cultural criticism ===
McCarthy has published on topics including Marcel Proust, Tupac Shakur, and the representation of women in the civil rights movement in film.

=== Non-fiction ===
In 2021, Norton's Liveright imprint published Who Will Pay Reparations on My Soul?, an essay collection by McCarthy addressing questions such as: "What do people owe each other when debts accrued can never be repaid?" In 2024, the University of Chicago Press brought out his monograph The Blue Period: Black Writing in the Early Cold War, which argues that black authors working between World War II and the rise of the Black power movement "forged an aesthetic resistance premised on fierce dissent from both US racial liberalism and Soviet communism".

=== Fiction ===
McCarthy's debut novel, The Fugitivities, was released June 2021. It is the story of Jonah Winters, a young black man forming his identity, with parts of the story set in Brooklyn, Brazil, Montevideo and Paris. McCarthy cites Gustave Flaubert's Sentimental Education as an important source of inspiration.

=== Editor ===
- W. E. B. Du Bois, The Souls of Black Folk (Norton Library, 2022)
- Minor Notes, Volume 1 (Penguin, 2023), with Joshua Bennett, with an introduction by Tracy K. Smith.
- Jean Toomer, Cane (3rd Norton Critical Edition, 2025), with Henry Louis Gates, Jr.
- The Norton Anthology of African American Literature (4th edition, 2025), section editor with Farah Jasmine Griffin.

== Awards ==
McCarthy was recipient of a 2022 Whiting Award ($50,000) in the non-fiction category, granted by the Whiting Foundation in Brooklyn, for Who Will Pay Reparations on My Soul?

The Blue Period was a finalist for the 2024 National Book Critics Circle Award for Criticism.
