= Laura Delano =

American writer and non-profit consultant

Laura Delano is an American writer and consultant who is the founder of the Inner Compass Initiative, a nonprofit organization that helps patients understand their psychiatric diagnoses and drugs and to build community outside of the mental health system.

== Early life ==
Delano is related to United States president Franklin Delano Roosevelt through her father. She was raised in Greenwich, Connecticut, the eldest of three sisters. Delano is a graduate of Harvard University.

== Works ==
In March 2025, Delano published the memoir Unshrunk: A Story of Psychiatric Treatment Resistance. The book details her struggle with mental healthcare, beginning when she received a diagnosis of bipolar disorder at the age of 13. Following that diagnosis, she spent decades struggling with psychiatric diagnoses, a "cascade" of differing medications, and mental health institutions. After coming across a meeting of Alcoholics Anonymous, she found the group's focus on responsibility for one's own self refreshing, starting a path of personal understanding that her struggles with mental health were rooted in the very psychiatric medications she had been prescribed.
