= Hayek's Bastards =

2025 book

Hayek's Bastards: Race, Gold, IQ, and the Capitalism of the Far Right
- Author: Quinn Slobodian
- Language: English
- Genre: Political history
- Publisher: Zone Books
- Publication date: April 15, 2025
- Pages: 272
- ISBN: 978-1890951917

Hayek's Bastards: Race, Gold, IQ, and the Capitalism of the Far Right is a 2025 political history book by Canadian scholar Quinn Slobodian.

== Summary ==
The book examines the influence of neoliberalism on the modern far-right and how the philosophies of Friedrich Hayek, Ludwig von Mises, and the Mont Pelerin Society would influence the far-right. Slobodian argues that this influence was led in part by elements of Hayek's advocacy, such as his criticism of social justice, his support for dictators like Augusto Pinochet and apartheid South Africa, his support for Margaret Thatcher's anti-immigration policies, his interest in psychology, and his later-in-life calls for neoliberalism to be underpinned not just by a defense of property but also on a moral or civilizational grounding. He argues that, ultimately, the rise of the far-right in the 21st century is not caused by a backlash against neoliberalism but rather originates from "mutant strains of neoliberalism."

Slobodian argues that many on the neoliberal far-right reacted to the dissolution of the Soviet Union in 1991 with fear more than with the triumphalism exhibited by more mainstream neoliberals (such as Francis Fukuyama's The End of History and the Last Man). He argues that these far-right neoliberals viewed the dissolution as marking not the collapse of socialism, but rather as the transition of socialism into a new form. This form would be exemplified by the social movements that began to reach prominence in the 1960s and 1970s, such as the civil rights movement, second and third-wave feminism, LGBTQ movements, and environmentalism, as well as by international institutions such as the United Nations and the European Union.

In response to this claimed transition, Slobodian argues that the neoliberal far-right began crafting an argument that neoliberalism was necessary as a result of essentialist human nature and began promoting a set of increasingly restrictive policies and views, such as supporting the hardening of international borders, supporting gold-backed hard money, and promoting the idea that there were hard-wired differences between different types of humans (such as intelligence quotients and scientific racism). Among the thinkers Slobodian discusses are anarcho-capitalist founder Murray Rothbard, anti-immigration activist Peter Brimelow, anti-communist economist Nathaniel Weyl, as well as political scientist Charles Murray and psychologist Richard Herrnstein (co-authors of the 1994 book The Bell Curve, which argued that there was a connection between race and intelligence). He also discusses organizations such as the Atlas Network and the Mises Institute.

Slobodian then argues that these arguments became solidified and transitioned into the mainstream of neoliberalism following the Great Recession of 2008 and subsequent crises in the Western world, including the 2015 European migrant crisis. In the final chapter of the book, Slobodian examines the politics of Javier Milei, a right-wing libertarian who became President of Argentina following the 2023 Argentine general election.

== Publication history ==
The title of the book was inspired by Canadian political philosopher John Ralston Saul's 1992 book Voltaire's Bastards: The Dictatorship of Reason in the West.

== Critical reception ==
Publishers Weekly gave the book a starred review, describing it as "incisive... Quinn’s robust analysis snaps many disparate lines of questioning into place. It’s a bravura performance of intellectual inquiry." Jennifer Szalai of The New York Times wrote that the book "demonstrates how a history of ideas can be riveting... [it] offers an illuminating history to our current bewildering moment, as right-wing populists join forces with billionaire oligarchs to take a chain saw to the foundations of public life, until there’s nothing left to stand on." James Ley of the Sydney Review of Books wrote that the book "has some important things to tell us about the origins and the tenor of right-wing populism," adding that "Slobodian is a model of scholarly integrity. He provides clear and substantiated accounts of the ideas put forward by his subjects and he analyses those ideas without heat." Becca Rothfeld of The Washington Post described the book as "indispensable," saying that it was "far more useful and original than the standard populist interpretation" of the rise of Donald Trump.

Writing in The Irish Times, Ian Hughes of University College Cork wrote that the book "charts clearly how today’s far right is simply a further degeneration from neoliberalism’s celebration of economic inequality and the primacy of economics as the measure of man."

Ashok Kumar of the left-wing publisher Verso Books wrote that the book "isn’t merely intellectual history; it’s a forensic examination of how neoliberalism’s immune system turned against itself, producing the autoimmune disorder we call the populist right," but argued that the book's focus on ideas was partially misplaced, asking "did Hayek’s ideas create neoliberalism or did neoliberalism elevate Hayek’s ideas because they served capital’s needs?"

Christopher Snowdon of the British right-wing think tank the Institute of Economic Affairs argued that "Slobodian has clearly started with his conclusion and worked backwards," accusing Slobodian of exaggerating the racial prejudice in Hayek's and Mises' works, saying that many of the people Slobodian discusses are trivial figures in neoliberalism while the most prominent far-right politicians of the 2020s (such as Trump, Le Pen, and Meloni) are barely mentioned, and that the 21st century far-right have more in common with left-wing figures like Naomi Klein and Bernie Sanders than with Hayek and Mises. Writing in Reason, Phillip W. Magness of the libertarian think tank the Independent Institute argued that Slobodian was "blind to any evidence that confounds his story," adding that "many on the "postliberal" far right today have more in common with Slobodian's own economic ideology than that of Mises or Hayek."
