= Nicholas Dames =

American literary critic and historian

Nicholas Dames is the Theodore Kahan Professor of Humanities at Columbia University. He is the editor in chief of Public Books.

His book The Chapter was a finalist for the National Book Critics Circle Award for Criticism and was the winner of the PROSE Award in Literature from the Association of American Publishers. His book Amnesiac Selves was awarded the Sonya Rudikoff Prize by the Northeast Victorian Studies Association.

== Books ==
- The Chapter: A Segmented History from Antiquity to the Twenty-First Century (Princeton, 2023)
- The Physiology of the Novel: Reading, Neural Science, and the Form of Victorian Fiction (Oxford, 2007)
- Amnesiac Selves: Nostalgia, Forgetting, and British Fiction, 1810-1870 (Oxford, 2001)
