= Less Than One =

1986 essay collection by Joseph Brodsky

- First edition
- Author: Joseph Brodsky
- Language: English
- Publisher: FSG
- Publication date: 1986
- Publication place: United States
- ISBN: 9780374185039

Less Than One: Selected Essays is a collection of literary and autobiographical essays by the Russian poet and Nobel Prize-winning author Joseph Brodsky. It was published in 1986 by Farrar, Straus and Giroux and was awarded that year's National Book Critics Circle Award for Criticism. The book includes essays on fellow Russian writers like Dostoyevsky, Mandelstam, and Platonov, as well as the poet W.H. Auden.
