= 1990 Nobel Prize in Literature =

- Octavio Paz Lozano
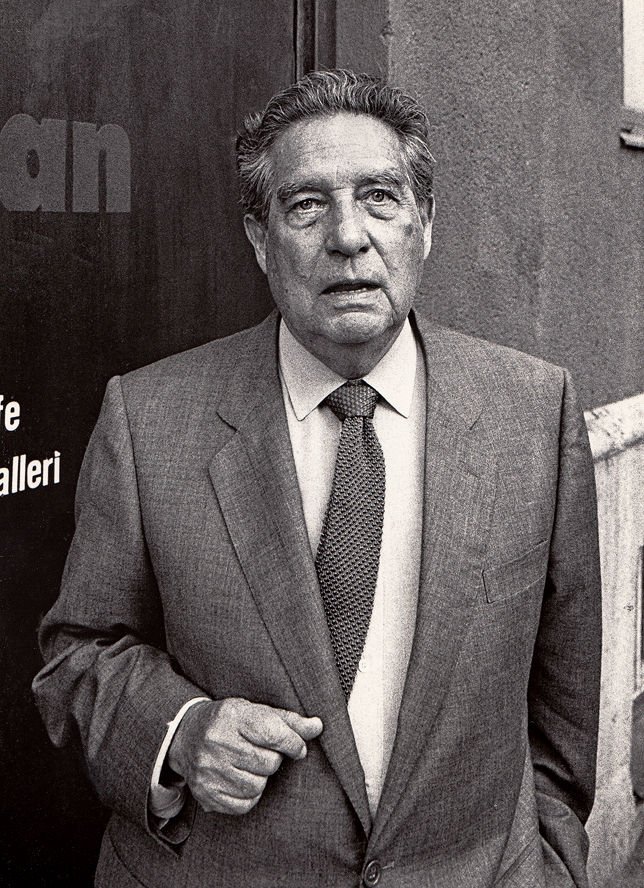
- "for impassioned writing with wide horizons, characterized by sensuous intelligence and humanistic integrity."
- Date: 11 October 1990 (announcement); 10 December 1990 (ceremony)
- Location: Stockholm, Sweden
- Presented by: Swedish Academy
- First award: 1901
- Website: Official website

The 1990 Nobel Prize in Literature was awarded to the Mexican poet and essayist Octavio Paz (1914–1998) "for impassioned writing with wide horizons, characterized by sensuous intelligence and humanistic integrity." He is the only recipient of the Nobel Prize in Literature from Mexico.

== Laureate ==
One of the best known works by Octavio Paz is El laberinto de la soledad ("The Labyrinth of Solitude", 1950), a collection of essays in which he analyzes Mexican history and culture. Paz has solely released poetry volumes up to this time including Piedra de Sol ("Sunstone", 1957). He started a number of literary publications, such as Vuelta and El hijo pródigo. Marxism, surrealism, existentialism, Buddhism, and Hinduism were just a few of the philosophies that had an impact on him. Love and sexuality were major topics in his later works. His works include the poetry collections Águila o sol? ("Eagle or Sun?", 1951), La Estación Violenta ("The Violent Season", 1956) and El Arco y la Lira ("The Bow and The Lyre", 1956).

== Nominations ==
At the prize announcement in October 1990, Sture Allén permanent secretary of the Swedish Academy, revealed that there were 150 candidates for the prize in 1990, 25 of them women. Octavio Paz had been a candidate for the prize throughout the 1980s. Literary circles believed that among the nominees for that year were the perennial candidates such as Carlos Fuentes, Nadine Gordimer (awarded in 1991), V. S. Naipaul (awarded in 2001), Milan Kundera, Max Frisch, Christa Wolf, Derek Walcott (awarded in 1992), Yasushi Inoue, Kōbō Abe, Alberto Moravia, Jaan Kross, Graham Greene and Mario Vargas Llosa (awarded in 2010).

== Reactions ==
Octavio Paz had been expected to receive the award for years. Paz himself said: "I was surprised because I didn't expect the prize. One or two years ago I knew I was a candidate, but this time, no. I didn't have the slightest idea, so I was doubly surprised."

== Award ceremony speech ==
At the award ceremony in Stockholm on 10 December 1990, Kjell Espmark of the Swedish Academy said:

When the Nobel Prize in Literature is awarded, for the second time in succession, to a writer from the Spanish-speaking world, it is a reminder of the exceptional literary vitality and richness of this sphere in our age. However, our main focus is on one of its most brilliant representatives: the Mexican poet and essayist Octavio Paz. The prize citation indicates what is perhaps most immediately striking in his writing: his passion and his integrity. (...) By welding together thinking and sensuousness Paz can give an immediate palpability to his continuous reflection on poetry, both when he participates in the mission of “spelling” the world, giving it a name and thereby a visibility, and when, as a reader, he finds himself watched from the whispering “foliage of the letters” (Pasado en claro). With such a method he can depict time in all its obtrusive ominousness, and give love power to surmount it.
