= Quinn Slobodian =

Canadian historian and professor (born 1978)

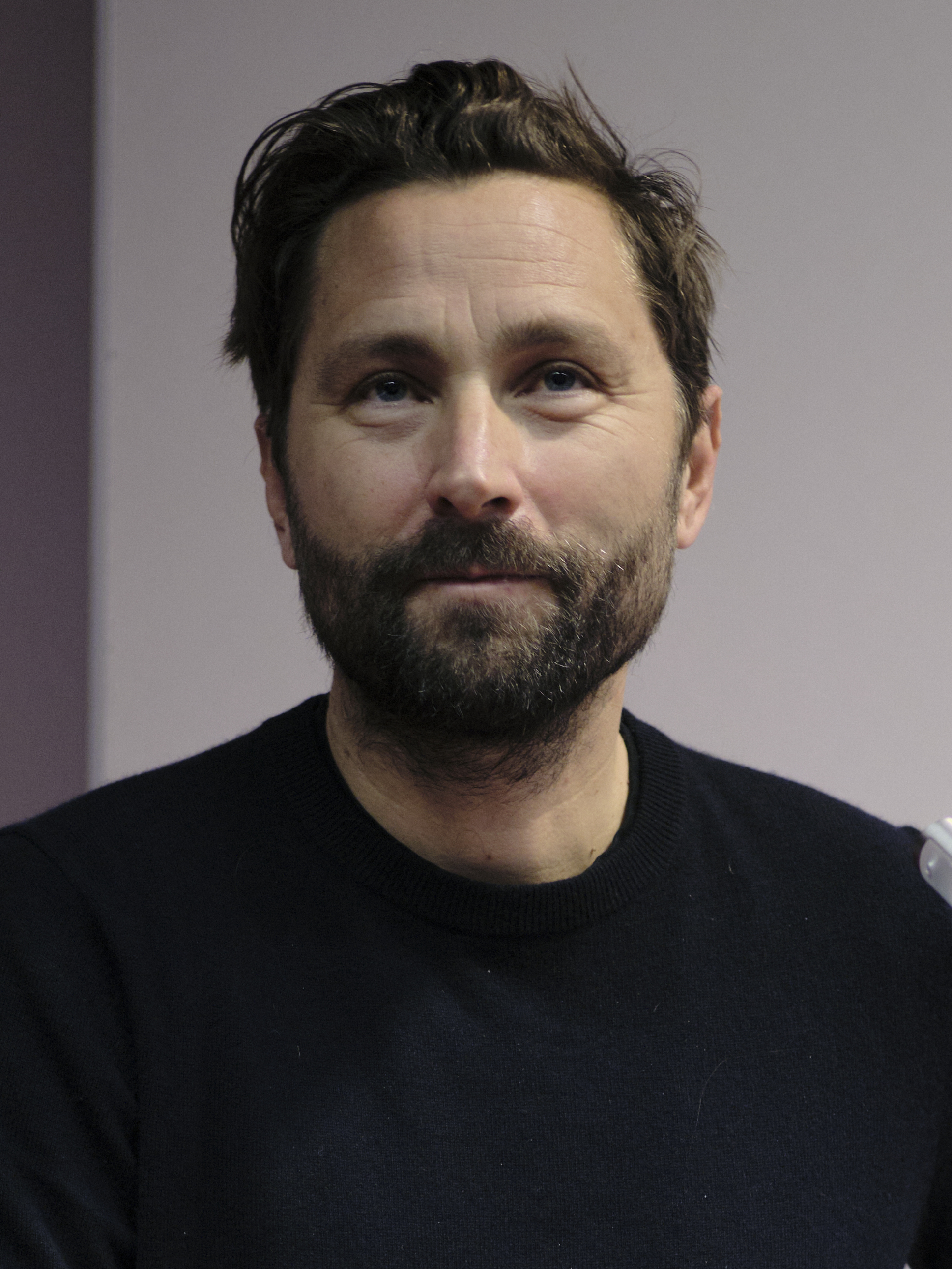
- Slobodian in 2023
- Born: 1978 (age 47–48); Edmonton, Alberta, Canada
- Occupations: Professor of International History, Boston University

Academic background
- Education: Lewis & Clark College; New York University (PhD)
- Thesis: (2008)
- Doctoral advisor: Molly Nolan

Academic work
- Discipline: History
- Institutions: Wellesley College; Free University Berlin; Harvard University
- Main interests: Modern European history International history
- Website: www.quinnslobodian.com

Quinn Slobodian (born 1978) is a Canadian historian of international history. He is a 2025 Guggenheim Fellow and Professor of International History at Boston University. Previously, he was the Marion Butler McLean Professor of the History of Ideas at Wellesley College and a Residential Fellow at the Weatherhead Center for International Affairs at Harvard University.

== Early life and education ==
Slobodian was born in 1978 in Edmonton, Alberta. His father was a doctor. The family moved to Vancouver Island in 1981, and relocated to Lesotho in Southern Africa a few years later. They left for Vanuatu in the South Pacific, in 1992, and returned to Canada a year later. He studied history at Lewis & Clark College, graduating in 2000, and was awarded his PhD by New York University in 2008.

== Career ==
In 2008, Slobodian took up a position as assistant professor of history at Wellesley College. Between 2013 and 2014, he was an Andrew W. Mellon Foundation-Volkswagen Foundation Postdoctoral Fellow at the Dahlem Humanities Centre of the Free University Berlin. In 2017–2018, Slobodian was a residential fellow at the Weatherhead Center for International Affairs at Harvard University.

In 2021, Slobodian became the Marion Butler McLean Professor of the History of Ideas at Wellesley College. In Spring 2022, he was visiting associate professor of international and public affairs at Brown University. In fall 2022, he was Thomas McCraw Fellow in U.S. Business History at the Harvard Business School. Since 2024, Slobodian has been professor of international history at Boston University. In the same year, he was a visiting professor at University of Roma 3. From 2020 to 2024, he was co-editor of the journal Contemporary European History.

Slobodian has written the books Foreign Front: Third World Politics in Sixties West Germany (2012), Globalists: The End of Empire and the Birth of Neoliberalism (2018), Crack-Up Capitalism: Market Radicals and the Dream of a World Without Democracy (2023), Hayek's Bastards: Race, Gold, IQ, and the Capitalism of the Far Right (2025), and Muskism: A Guide for the Perplexed (2026).

== Publications ==
As author

- Foreign Front: Third World Politics in Sixties West Germany, Duke UP, 2012.
- Globalists: The End of Empire and the Birth of Neoliberalism, Harvard UP, 2018.
- Crack-Up Capitalism: Market Radicals and the Dream of a World Without Democracy, Metropolitan, 2023.
- Hayek's Bastards: Race, Gold, IQ, and the Capitalism of the Far Right, Zone Books, April 2025.
- Muskism: A Guide for the Perplexed, with Ben Tarnoff, HarperCollins, 2026

As editor

- Comrades of Color: East Germany in the Cold War World, Berghahn Books, 2015.
- Nine Lives of Neoliberalism, with Dieter Plehwe and Philip Mirowski, Verso, 2020.
- Market Civilizations: Neoliberals East and South, with Dieter Plehwe, Zone Books, 2020.
