= Joseph Brodsky =

Russian poet (1940–1996)

- Иосиф Бродский
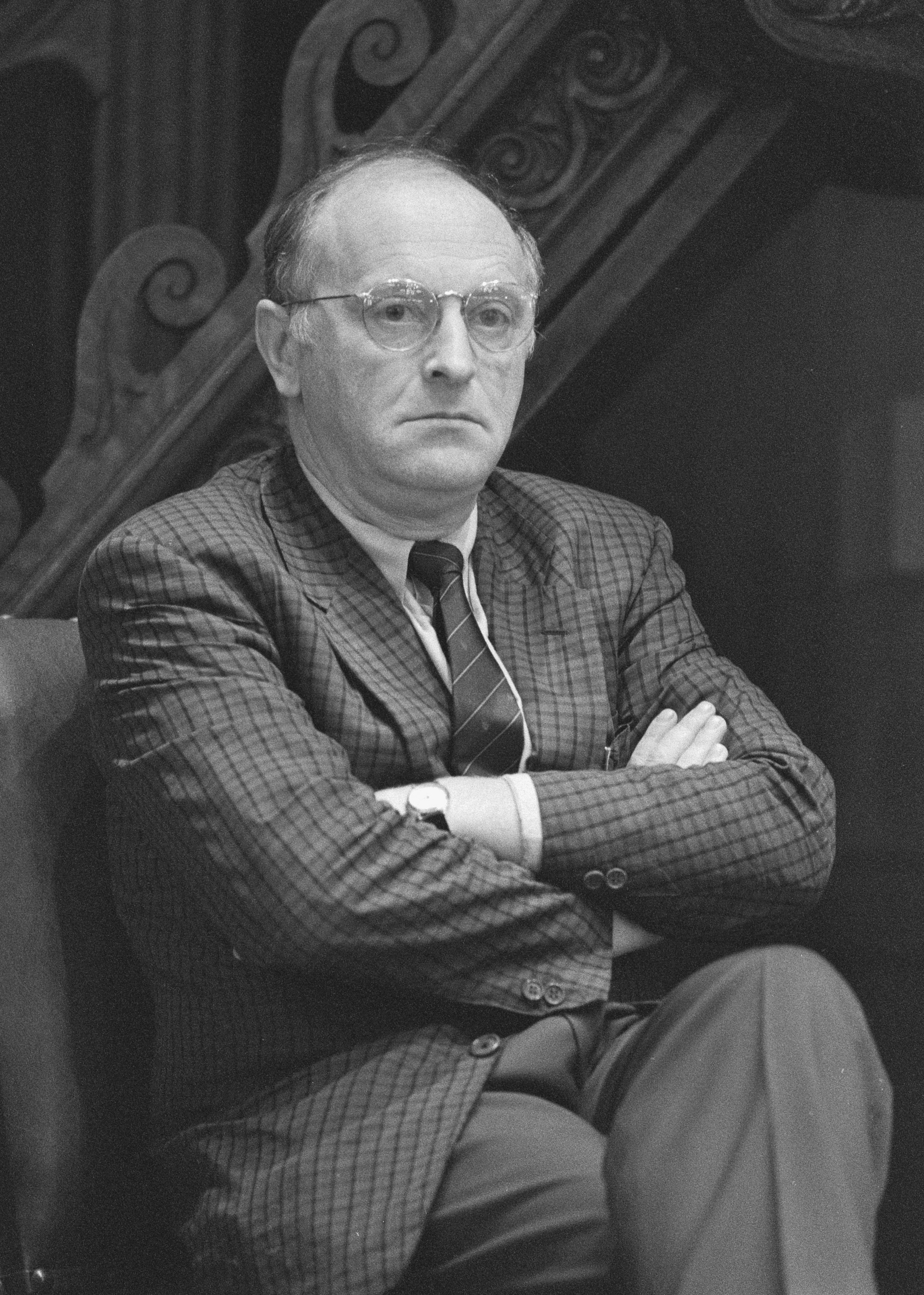
- Brodsky in 1988
- Born: Iosif Aleksandrovich Brodsky; 24 May 1940; Leningrad, Russian SFSR, Soviet Union (now Saint Petersburg, Russia)
- Died: 28 January 1996 (aged 55); New York City, U.S.
- Resting place: Isola di San Michele, Venice, Italy
- Citizenship: Soviet Union (1940–72); Stateless (1972–77); United States (1977–96)
- Occupations: Poet, essayist
- Spouse: Maria Sozzani (m. 1990)
- Partners: Marina Basmanova (1962–1967); Maria Kuznetsova
- Children: 3
- Writing career
- Language: Russian (poetry), English (prose)
- Notable works: Gorbunov and Gorchakov (1970); Less Than One: Selected Essays (1986)
- Notable awards: Nobel Prize in Literature (1987); Struga Poetry Evenings Golden Wreath Award (1991)

Iosif Aleksandrovich Brodsky (Note: /ˈbrɒdski/ BROD-skee; Russian: Иосиф Александрович Бродский [ɪˈosʲɪf ɐlʲɪˈksandrəvʲɪtɕ ˈbrotskʲɪj].) (24 May 1940 – 28 January 1996), anglicized as Joseph, (Note: And also sometimes known as Josip or Josef.) was a Russian and American poet and essayist.

Born in Leningrad (now Saint Petersburg) in the Soviet Union, Brodsky ran afoul of Soviet authorities and was expelled ("strongly advised" to emigrate) from the Soviet Union in 1972, settling in the United States with the help of W. H. Auden and other supporters. He taught thereafter at Mount Holyoke College, and at universities including Yale, Columbia, Cambridge, and Michigan. Brodsky was awarded the 1987 Nobel Prize in Literature "for an all-embracing authorship, imbued with clarity of thought and poetic intensity". He was appointed United States Poet Laureate in 1991.

According to Professor Andrey Ranchin of Moscow State University, "Brodsky is the only modern Russian poet whose body of work has already been awarded the honorary title of a canonized classic... Brodsky's literary canonization is an exceptional phenomenon. No other contemporary Russian writer has been honored as the hero of such a number of memoir texts; no other has had so many conferences devoted to them." Daniel Murphy, in his seminal text Christianity and Modern European Literature, includes Brodsky among the most influential Christian poets of the 20th century, along with T. S. Eliot, Osip Mandelstam, Anna Akhmatova (Brodsky's mentor for a time), and W. H. Auden (who sponsored Brodsky's cause in the United States). Irene Steckler was the first to categorically state that Brodsky was "unquestionably a Christian poet". Before that, in July 1972, following his exile, Brodsky himself, in an interview, said: "While I am related to the Old Testament perhaps by ancestry, and certainly the spirit of justice, I consider myself a Christian. Not a good one but I try to be." The contemporary Russian poet and fellow-Acmeist, Viktor Krivulin, said that "Brodsky always felt his Jewishness as a religious thing, despite the fact that, when all is said and done, he's a Christian poet."

== Early years ==
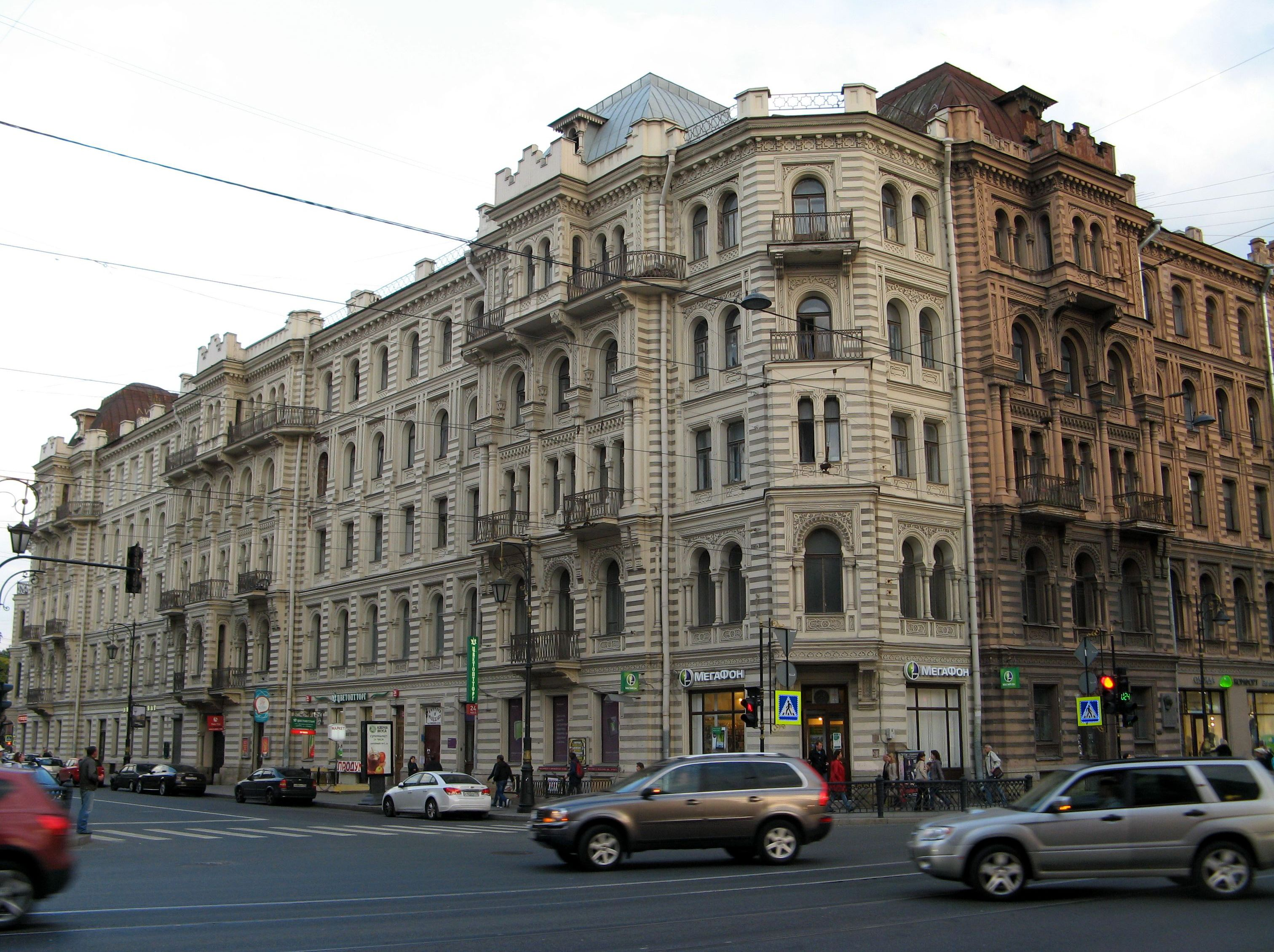
Muruzi House, Saint Petersburg, where its Brodsky memorial plaque is visible in the middle of the ground floor of the brown building

Brodsky was born into a Russian Jewish family in Leningrad (now Saint Petersburg). A descendant of a prominent and ancient rabbinic family, Schorr (Shor) his direct male-line ancestor was Joseph ben Isaac Bekhor Shor. His father, Aleksandr Brodsky, was a professional photographer in the Soviet Navy, and his mother, Maria Volpert Brodskaya, a professional interpreter whose work often helped to support the family. They lived in communal apartments, in poverty, marginalized by their Jewish status. In early childhood, Brodsky survived the Siege of Leningrad where he and his parents nearly died of starvation; one aunt did die of hunger. He later developed various health problems caused by the siege. Brodsky commented that many of his teachers were anti-Jewish and that he felt like a dissident from an early age. He noted "I began to despise Lenin, even when I was in the first grade, not so much because of his political philosophy or practice ... but because of his omnipresent images."

As a young student, Brodsky was "an unruly child" known for his misbehavior during classes. At fifteen, Brodsky left school and tried to enter the School of Submariners without success. He went on to work as a milling machine operator. Later, having decided to become a physician, he worked at the morgue at the Kresty Prison, cutting and sewing bodies. He subsequently held a variety of jobs in hospitals, in a ship's boiler room, and on geological expeditions. At the same time, Brodsky engaged in a program of self-education. He learned Polish so he could translate the works of Polish poets such as Czesław Miłosz, and English so that he could translate John Donne. On the way, he acquired a deep interest in classical philosophy, religion, mythology, and English and American poetry.

== Career and family ==
=== Early career ===
So long had life together been, that once
the snow began to fall, it seemed unending;
that, lest the flakes should make her eyelids wince,
I'd shield them with my hand, and they, pretending
not to believe that cherishing of eyes,
would beat against my palm like butterflies.

— from "Six Years Later"," Trans. Richard Wilbur

In 1955, Brodsky began writing his own poetry and producing literary translations. He circulated them in secret, and some were published by the underground journal, Sintaksis (Syntax, Russian: Си́нтаксис). His writings were apolitical. By 1958 he was already well known in literary circles for his poems "The Jewish cemetery near Leningrad" and "Pilgrims". Asked when he first felt called to poetry, he recollected, "In 1959, in Yakutsk, when walking in that terrible city, I went into a bookstore. I snagged a copy of poems by Baratynsky. I had nothing to read. So I read that book and finally understood what I had to do in life. Or got very excited, at least. So in a way, Evgeny Abramovich Baratynsky is sort of responsible." His friend, Ludmila Shtern (Людмила Яковлевна Штерн, Ljudmíla Jákovlevna Štern), recalled working with Brodsky on an irrigation project in his "geological period" (working as a geologist's assistant): "We bounced around the Leningrad Province examining kilometers of canals, checking their embankments, which looked terrible. They were falling down, coming apart, had all sorts of strange things growing in them... It was during these trips, however, that I was privileged to hear the poems "The Hills" and "You Will Gallop in the Dark". Brodsky read them aloud to me between two train cars as we were going towards Tikhvin."

In 1960, the young Brodsky met Anna Akhmatova, one of the leading poets of the silver age. She encouraged his work, and became his mentor. In 1962, in Leningrad, Anna Akhmatova introduced him to the artist Marina Basmanova, a young painter from an established artistic family who was drawing Akhmatova's portrait. The two started a relationship; however, Brodsky's then close friend and fellow poet, Dmitri Bobyshev, was in love with Basmanova. As Bobyshev began to pursue the woman, immediately, the authorities began to pursue Brodsky; Bobyshev was widely held responsible for denouncing him. Brodsky dedicated much love poetry to Marina Basmanova:

I was only that which
you touched with your palm
over which, in the deaf, raven-black
night, you bent your head ...
I was practically blind.
You, appearing, then hiding,
taught me to see.

=== Denunciation ===
In 1963, Brodsky's poetry was denounced by a Leningrad newspaper as "pornographic and anti-Soviet". His papers were confiscated, he was interrogated, twice put in a mental institution and then arrested. He was charged with social parasitism by the Soviet authorities in a trial in 1964, finding that his series of odd jobs and role as a poet were not a sufficient contribution to society. They called him "a pseudo-poet in velveteen trousers" who failed to fulfill his "constitutional duty to work honestly for the good of the motherland". The trial judge asked, "Who has recognized you as a poet? Who has enrolled you in the ranks of poets?" – "No one", Brodsky replied, "Who enrolled me in the ranks of the human race?"

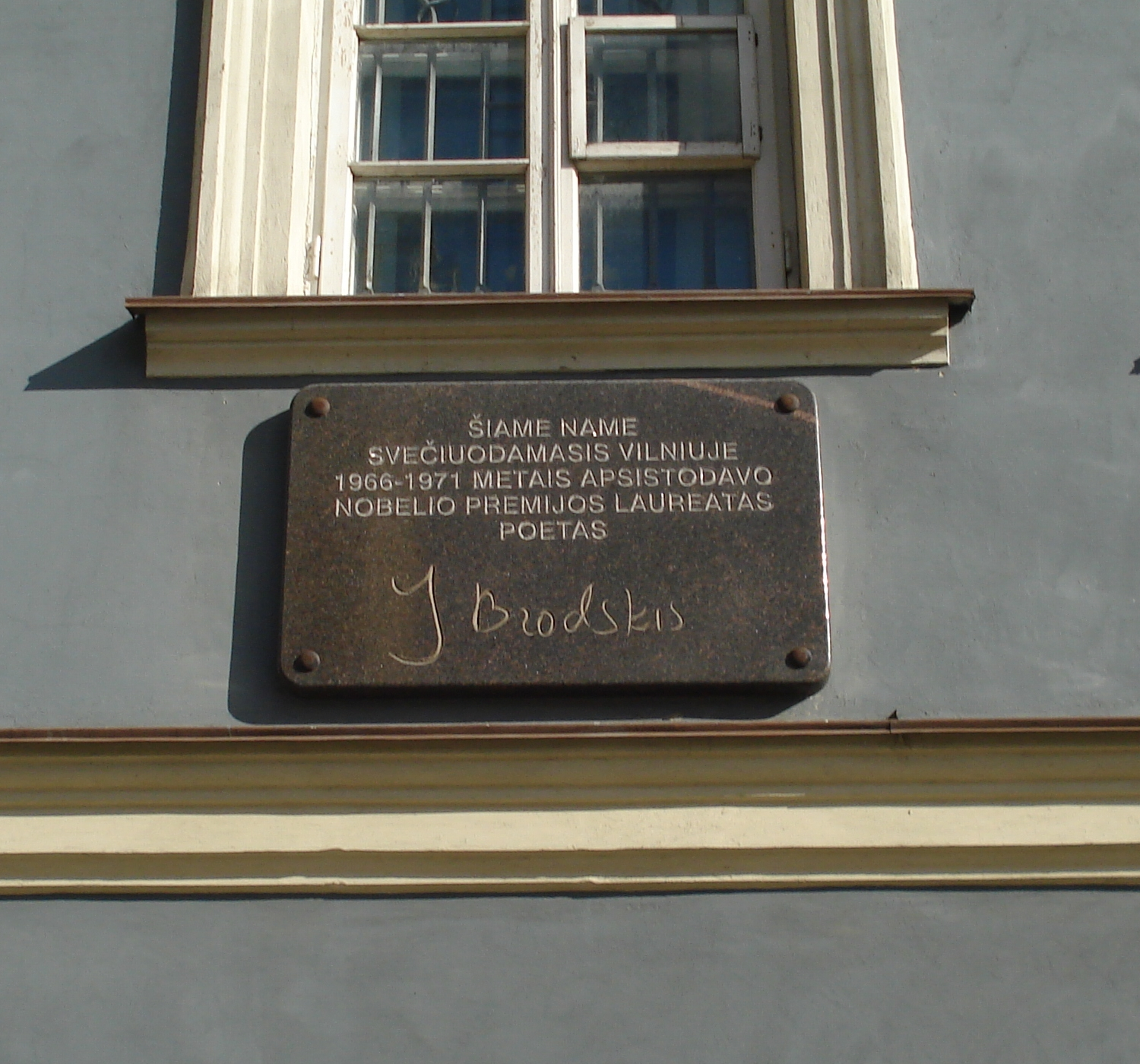
Plaque marking where Brodsky stayed in Vilnius

For his "parasitism" Brodsky was sentenced to five years hard labor and served 18 months on a farm in the village of Norenskaya, in the Arkhangelsk region, 350 miles from Leningrad. He rented his own small cottage, and although it was without plumbing or central heating, having one's own, private space was taken to be a great luxury at the time. Basmanova, Bobyshev, and Brodsky's mother, among others, visited. He wrote on his typewriter, chopped wood, hauled manure, and at night read his anthologies of English and American poetry, including a lot of W. H. Auden and Robert Frost. Brodsky's close friend and biographer Lev Loseff writes that while his confinement in the mental hospital and the trial were miserable experiences, the 18 months in the Arctic were among the best times of Brodsky's life. Brodsky's mentor, Anna Akhmatova, laughed at the KGB's shortsightedness. "What a biography they're fashioning for our red-haired friend!", she said. "It's as if he'd hired them to do it on purpose."

Brodsky's sentence was commuted in 1965 after protests by prominent Soviet and foreign cultural figures, including Evgeny Evtushenko, Dmitri Shostakovich, and Jean-Paul Sartre as well as Akhmatova. Brodsky became a cause célèbre in the West also, when a secret transcription of trial minutes was smuggled out of the country, making him a symbol of artistic resistance in a totalitarian society, much like his mentor, Akhmatova.

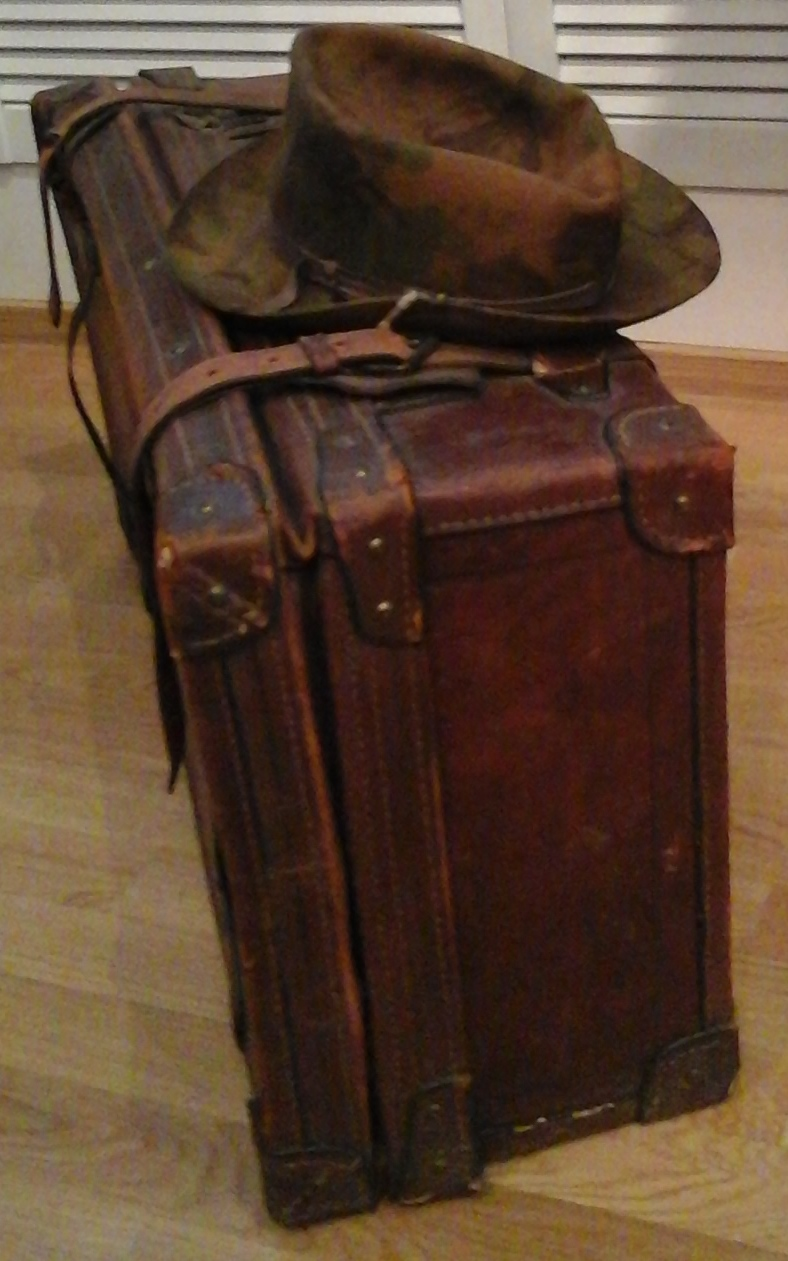
The suitcase with which Brodsky left his homeland, on 4 June 1972, carrying a typewriter, two bottles of vodka, and a collection of poems by John Donne - today displayed in the Anna Akhmatova Museum, Saint Petersburg

Since the stern art of poetry calls for words, I, morose,
deaf, and balding ambassador of a more or less
insignificant nation that's stuck in this super
power, wishing to spare my old brain,
put on clothes – all by myself – and head for the main
street: for the evening paper.

— from "The End of a Beautiful Era" (Leningrad 1969)

His son, Andrei, was born on 8 October 1967, and Basmanova broke off the relationship. Andrei was registered under Basmanova's surname because Brodsky did not want his son to suffer from the political attacks that he endured. Marina Basmanova was threatened by the Soviet authorities, which prevented her from marrying Brodsky or joining him when he was exiled from the country. After the birth of their son, Brodsky continued to dedicate love poetry to Basmanova. In 1989, Brodsky wrote his last poem to "M.B.", describing himself remembering their life in Leningrad:

Your voice, your body, your name
mean nothing to me now. No one destroyed them.
It's just that, in order to forget one life, a person needs to live
at least one other life. And I have served that portion.

Brodsky returned to Leningrad in December 1965 and continued to write over the next seven years, many of his works being translated into German, French, and English and published abroad. Verses and Poems was published by Inter-Language Literary Associates in Washington in 1965, Elegy to John Donne and Other Poems was published in London in 1967 by Longmans Green, and A Stop in the Desert was issued in 1970 by Chekhov Publishing in New York. Only four of his poems were published in Leningrad anthologies in 1966 and 1967, most of his work appearing outside the Soviet Union or circulated in secret (samizdat) until 1987. Persecuted for his poetry and his Jewish heritage, he was denied permission to travel. In 1972, while Brodsky was being considered for exile, the authorities consulted mental health expert Andrei Snezhnevsky, a key proponent of the notorious pseudo-medical diagnosis of "paranoid reformist delusion". This political tool allowed the state to lock up dissenters in psychiatric institutions indefinitely. Without examining him personally, Snezhnevsky diagnosed Brodsky as having "sluggishly progressing schizophrenia", concluding that he was "not a valuable person at all and may be let go". In 1971, Brodsky was invited twice to emigrate to Israel. When called to the Ministry of the Interior in 1972 and asked why he had not accepted, he stated that he wished to stay in the country. Within ten days officials broke into his apartment, took his papers, and on 4 June 1972, put him on a plane for Vienna, Austria. He never returned to Russia and never saw Basmanova again. Brodsky later wrote "The Last Judgement is the Last Judgement, but a human being who spent his life in Russia, has to be, without any hesitation, placed into Paradise."

In Austria, he met Carl Ray Proffer and Auden, who facilitated Brodsky's transit to the United States and proved influential to Brodsky's career. Proffer, of the University of Michigan and one of the co-founders of Ardis Publishers, became Brodsky's Russian publisher from this point on. Recalling his landing in Vienna, Brodsky commented:

I knew I was leaving my country for good, but for where, I had no idea whatsoever. One thing which was quite clear was that I didn't want to go to Israel... I never even believed that they'd allow me to go. I never believed they would put me on a plane, and when they did I didn't know whether the plane would go east or west... I didn't want to be hounded by what was left of the Soviet Security Service in England. So I came to the States.

Although the poet was invited back after the fall of the Soviet Union, Brodsky never returned to his country.

=== United States ===
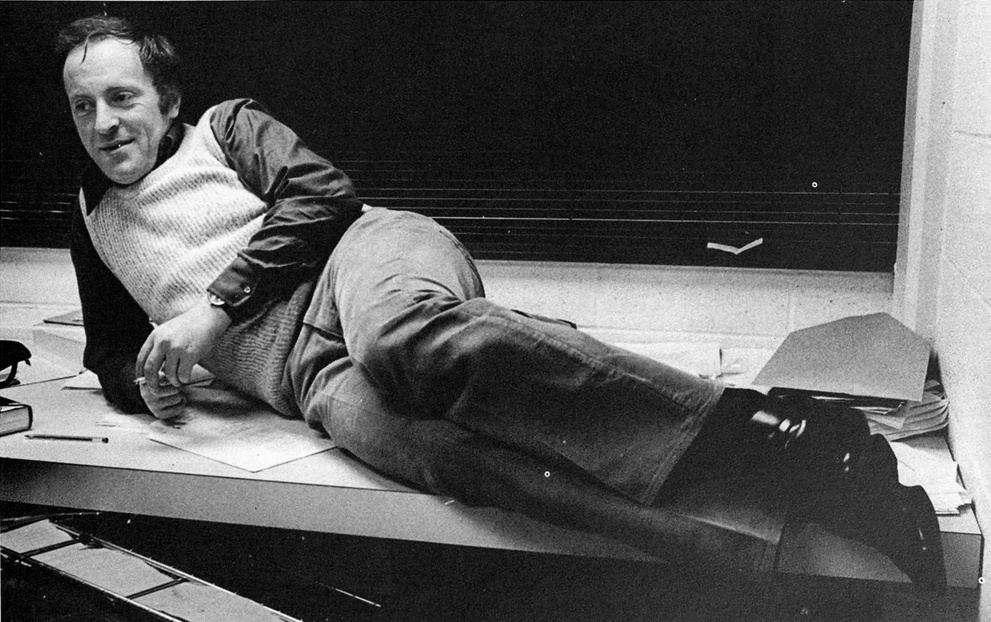
Brodsky teaching at University of Michigan, c. 1972

After a short stay in Vienna, Brodsky settled in Ann Arbor, with the help of poets Auden and Proffer, and became poet-in-residence at the University of Michigan for a year. Brodsky went on to become a visiting professor at Queens College (1973–74), Smith College, Columbia University, and Cambridge University, later returning to the University of Michigan (1974–80). He was the Andrew Mellon Professor of Literature and Five College Professor of Literature at Mount Holyoke College, brought there by poet and historian Peter Viereck. In 1978, Brodsky was awarded an honorary degree of Doctor of Letters at Yale University, and on 23 May 1979, he was inducted as a member of the American Academy and Institute of Arts and Letters. He moved to New York's Greenwich Village in 1980 and in 1981 received the John D. and Catherine T. MacArthur Foundation "genius" award. He was also a recipient of The International Center in New York Award of Excellence. In 1986, his collection of essays, Less Than One, won the National Book Critics Award for Criticism and he was given an honorary doctorate of literature from Oxford University.

In 1987, he won the Nobel Prize for Literature, the fifth Russian-born writer to do so. In an interview he was asked: "You are an American citizen who is receiving the Prize for Russian-language poetry. Who are you, an American or a Russian?" "I'm Jewish; a Russian poet, an English essayist – and, of course, an American citizen", he responded. The academy stated that they had awarded the prize for his "all-embracing authorship, imbued with clarity of thought and poetic intensity". It also called his writing "rich and intensely vital", characterized by "great breadth in time and space". It was "a big step for me, a small step for mankind", he joked. The prize coincided with the first legal publication in Russia of Brodsky's poetry as an exilé.

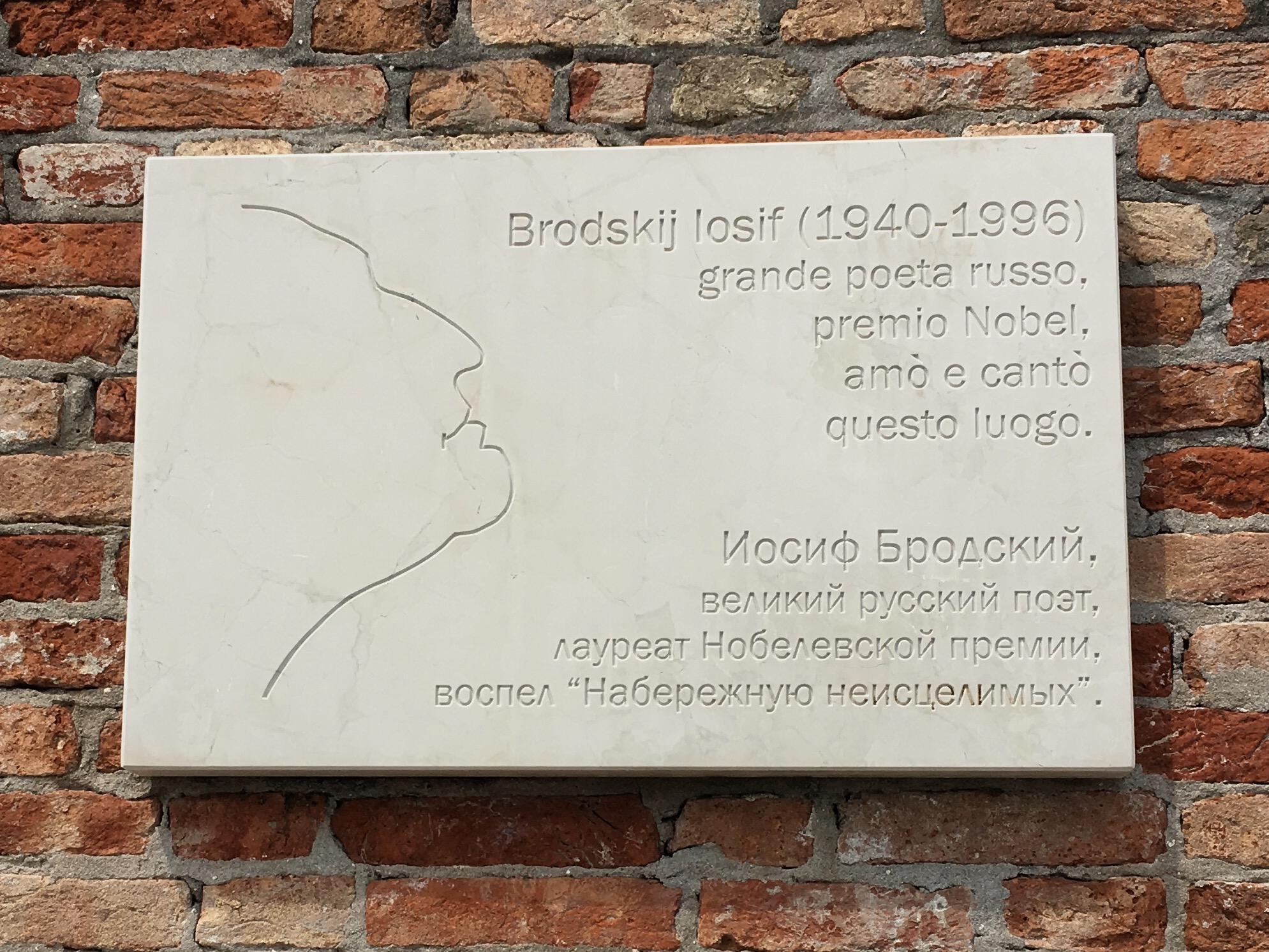
Plaque in honour of Brodsky in Venice

In 1991, Brodsky became Poet Laureate of the United States. The Librarian of Congress said that Brodsky had "the open-ended interest of American life that immigrants have. This is a reminder that so much of American creativity is from people not born in America." His inauguration address was printed in Poetry Review. Brodsky held an honorary degree from the University of Silesia in Poland and was an honorary member of the International Academy of Science. In 1995, Gleb Uspensky, a senior editor at the Russian publishing house, Vagrius, asked Brodsky to return to Russia for a tour, but he could not agree. For the last ten years of his life, Brodsky was under considerable pressure from those that regarded him as a "fortune maker". He was a greatly honored professor, was on first name terms with the heads of many large publishing houses and connected to the significant figures of American literary life. His friend Ludmila Shtern wrote that many Russian intellectuals in both Russia and America assumed his influence was unlimited, that a nod from him could secure them a book contract, a teaching post or a grant, that it was in his gift to assure a glittering career. A helping hand or a rejection of a petition for help could create a storm in Russian literary circles, which Shtern suggests became very personal at times. His position as a lauded émigré and Nobel Prize winner won him enemies and stoked resentment, the politics of which, she writes, made him feel "deathly tired" of it all toward the end.

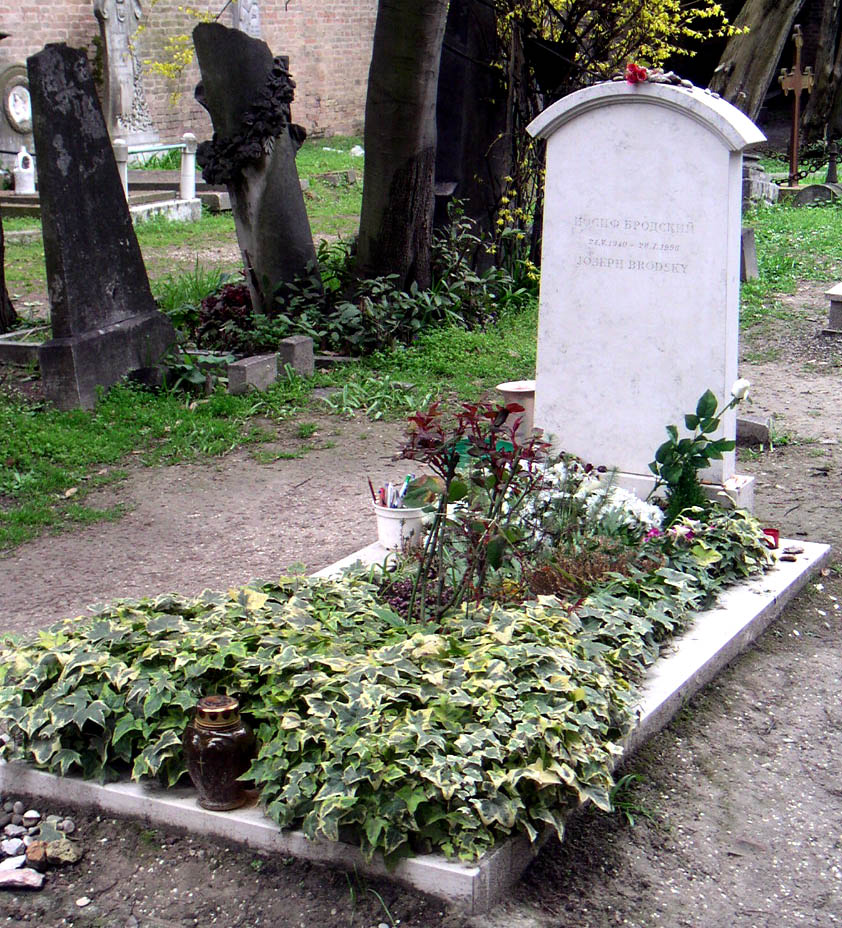
Grave of Brodsky in the Protestant section of the Cimitero di San Michele, Venice, Veneto, Italy

In 1990, while teaching literature in France, Brodsky married a young student, Maria Sozzani, who has a Russian-Italian background; they had one daughter, Anna Brodsky, born in 1993.

Marina Basmanova lived in fear of the Soviet authorities until the collapse of the Soviet Union in 1991; only after this was their son Andrei Basmanov allowed to join his father in New York. In the 1990s, Brodsky invited Andrei to visit him in New York for three months and they maintained a father-son relationship until Brodsky's death. Andrei married in the 1990s and had three children, all of whom were recognized and supported by Brodsky as his grandchildren; Marina Basmanova, Andrei, and Brodsky's grandchildren all live in Saint Petersburg, Russia. Andrei gave readings of his father's poetry in a documentary about Brodsky. The film contains Brodsky's poems dedicated to Marina Basmanova and written between 1961 and 1982.

Brodsky died of a heart attack aged 55, at his apartment in Brooklyn Heights, a neighborhood of Brooklyn, a borough of New York City, on 28 January 1996. He had open-heart surgery in 1979 and later two bypass operations, remaining in frail health following that time. He was buried in a non-Catholic section of the San Michele cemetery in Venice, Italy, also the resting place of Ezra Pound and Igor Stravinsky. In 1997, a plaque was placed on his former house in St. Petersburg, with his portrait in relief and the words "In this house from 1940 to 1972 lived the great Russian poet, Iosif Aleksandrovich Brodsky". Brodsky's close friend, the Nobel laureate Derek Walcott, memorialized him in his collection The Prodigal, in 2004.

== Work ==
I was born and grew up in the Baltic marshland
by zinc-gray breakers that always marched on
in twos.

— From the title poem in A Part of Speech (1977)

Brodsky is perhaps most known for his poetry collections, A Part of Speech (1977) and To Urania (1988), and the essay collection, Less Than One (1986), which won the National Book Critics Circle Award. Other notable works include the play, Marbles (1989), and Watermark (1992), a prose meditation on Venice. Throughout his career he wrote in Russian and English, self-translating and working with eminent poet-translators.

=== Themes and forms ===
In his introduction to Brodsky's Selected Poems (New York and Harmondsworth, 1973), W. H. Auden described Brodsky as a traditionalist lyric poet fascinated by "encounters with nature, ... reflections upon the human condition, death, and the meaning of existence". He drew on wide-ranging themes, from Mexican and Caribbean literature to Roman poetry, mixing "the physical and the metaphysical, place and ideas about place, now and the past and the future". Critic Dinah Birch suggests that Brodsky's " first volume of poetry in English, Joseph Brodsky: Selected Poems (1973), shows that although his strength was a distinctive kind of dry, meditative soliloquy, he was immensely versatile and technically accomplished in a number of forms."

To Urania: Selected Poems 1965–1985 collected translations of older work with new work written during his American exile and reflect on themes of memory, home, and loss. His two essay collections consist of critical studies of such poets as Osip Mandelshtam, W.H. Auden, Thomas Hardy, Rainer Maria Rilke and Robert Frost, sketches of his own life, and those of contemporaries such as Akhmatova, Nadezhda Mandelshtam, and Stephen Spender.

A recurring theme in Brodsky's writing is the relationship between the poet and society. In particular, Brodsky emphasized the power of literature to affect its audience positively and to develop the language and culture in which it is situated. He suggested that the Western literary tradition was in part responsible for the world having overcome the catastrophes of the twentieth century, such as Nazism, Communism, and two World Wars. During his term as Poet Laureate, Brodsky promoted the idea of bringing the Anglo-American poetic heritage to a wider American audience by distributing free poetry anthologies to the public through a government-sponsored program. Librarian of Congress James Billington wrote:

Joseph had difficulty understanding why poetry did not draw the large audiences in the United States that it did in Russia. He was proud of becoming an American citizen in 1977 (the Soviets having made him stateless upon his expulsion in 1972) and valued the freedoms that life in the United States provided. But he regarded poetry as "language's highest degree of maturity", and wanted everyone to be susceptible to it. As Poet Laureate, he suggested that inexpensive anthologies of the best American poets be made available in hotels and airports, hospitals and supermarkets. He thought that people who are restless or fearful or lonely or weary might pick up poetry and discover unexpectedly that others had experienced these emotions before and had used them to celebrate life rather than escape from it. Joseph's idea was picked up, and thousands of such books have in fact been placed where people may come across them out of need or curiosity.

This passion for promoting the seriousness and importance of poetry comes through in Brodsky's opening remarks as the U.S. Poet Laureate in October 1991. He said, "By failing to read or listen to poets, society dooms itself to inferior modes of articulation, those of the politician, the salesman or the charlatan. ... In other words, it forfeits its own evolutionary potential. For what distinguishes us from the rest of the animal kingdom is precisely the gift of speech. ... Poetry is not a form of entertainment and in a certain sense not even a form of art, but it is our anthropological, genetic goal, our evolutionary, linguistic beacon." This sentiment is echoed throughout his work. In interview with Sven Birkerts in 1979, Brodsky reflected:

In the works of the better poets you get the sensation that they're not talking to people any more, or to some seraphical creature. What they're doing is simply talking back to the language itself, as beauty, sensuality, wisdom, irony, those aspects of language of which the poet is a clear mirror. Poetry is not an art or a branch of art, it's something more. If what distinguishes us from other species is speech, then poetry, which is the supreme linguistic operation, is our anthropological, indeed genetic, goal. Anyone who regards poetry as an entertainment, as "a read", commits an anthropological crime, in the first place, against himself.

=== Influences ===
Librarian of Congress Dr James Billington, wrote:

He was the favored protégé of the great lady of Petersburg, Anna Akhmatova, and to hear him read her poems in Russian in the Library of Congress was an experience to make one's hair stand on end even if one did not understand the Russian language. Joseph Brodsky was the embodiment of the hopes not only of Anna Akhmatova, the last of the great Petersburg poets from the beginning of the century, but also Nadezhda Mandelstam, the widow of another great martyred poet Osip Mandelstam. Both of them saw Joseph as part of the guiding light that might some day lead Russia back to her own deep roots.

Brodsky also was deeply influenced by the English metaphysical poets from John Donne to Auden. Many works were dedicated to other writers such as Tomas Venclova, Octavio Paz, Robert Lowell, Derek Walcott, and Benedetta Craveri.

Brodsky's work is seen to have been vitally enhanced by the work of renowned translators. A Part of Speech (New York and Oxford, 1980), his second major collection in English, includes translations by Anthony Hecht, Howard Moss, Derek Walcott, and Richard Wilbur. Critic and poet Henri Cole notes that Brodsky's "own translations have been criticized for turgidness, lacking a native sense of musicality."

After the Russian annexation of Crimea in 2014, Brodsky's controversial poem On the Independence of Ukraine (Russian: На независимость Украины) from the early 1990s (which he did not publish but publicly recited) was repeatedly picked up by state-affiliated Russian media and declared Poem of the Year. The Estate of Joseph Brodsky was subsequently prosecuting some websites publishing the poem, demanding its removal.

== Awards and honors ==
- 1978 – Honorary degree of Doctor of Letters, Yale University
- 1979 – Fellowship of American Academy and Institute of Arts and Letters
- 1981 – John D. and Catherine T. MacArthur Foundation award
- 1986 – Honorary doctorate of literature from Oxford University
- The International Center in New York's Award of Excellence
- 1986 – National Book Critics Award for Criticism, for Less Than One (essay collection)
- 1987 – Nobel Prize
- 1989 – Honorary doctorate from the University of Essex
- 1989 – Honorary degree from Dartmouth College
- 1991 – honorary doctorate from the Faculty of Humanities at Uppsala University, Sweden
- 1991 – United States Poet Laureate
- 1991 – Struga Poetry Evenings Golden Wreath Award
- 1993 – Honorary degree from the University of Silesia in Poland
- Honorary member of the International Academy of Science, Munich

== Works ==
=== Poetry collections ===
- 1967: Elegy for John Donne and Other Poems, selected, translated, and introduced by Nicholas William Bethell, London: Longman
- 1968: Velka elegie, Paris: Edice Svedectvi
- 1972: Poems, Ann Arbor, Michigan: Ardis
- 1973: Selected Poems, translated from the Russian by George L. Kline. New York: Harper & Row
- 1977: A Part of Speech
- 1977: Poems and Translations, Keele: University of Keele
- 1980: A Part of Speech, New York: Farrar, Straus & Giroux
- 1981: Verses on the Winter Campaign 1980, translation by Alan Myers.–London: Anvil Press
- 1988: To Urania: Selected Poems, 1965–1985, New York: Farrar, Straus & Giroux
- 1996: So Forth: Poems, New York: Farrar, Straus & Giroux
- 1999: Discovery, New York: Farrar, Straus & Giroux
- 2000: Collected Poems in English, 1972–1999, edited by Ann Kjellberg, New York: Farrar, Straus & Giroux
- 2001: Nativity Poems, translated by Melissa Green–New York: Farrar, Straus & Giroux
- 2020: Selected Poems, 1968–1996, edited by Ann Kjellberg, New York: Farrar, Straus & Giroux

=== Essay and interview collections ===
- 1986: Less Than One: Selected Essays, New York: Farrar, Straus & Giroux. (Winner of the National Book Critics Circle Award) ISBN 0374520550, 9780374520557
- 1992: Watermark, Noonday Press; New York: Farrar, Straus & Giroux, reflecting the writer's love affair with Venice, where he stayed at least 20 times.ISBN 978-1-78308-898-0, 978-1-78308-899-7
- 1995: On Grief and Reason: Essays, New York: Farrar, Straus & Giroux ISBN 0374525099, 978-0374525095
- 2003: Joseph Brodsky: Conversations, edited by Cynthia L. Haven. Jackson, Miss.: University Press of Mississippi Literary Conversations Series.ISBN 1578065283, 978-1578065288

=== Plays ===
- 1989: Marbles: a Play in Three Acts, translated by Alan Myers with Joseph Brodsky. New York: Farrar, Straus & Giroux ISBN 0374202885, 978-0374202880
- 1991: Democracy! in Granta 30: New Europe, translated by Alan Myers and Joseph Brodsky. ISBN 0-14-014589-3, 978-0140145892

== In film ==
- 2008 – A Room And A Half (Полторы комнаты или сентиментальное путешествие на родину, Poltory komnaty ili sentimental'noe puteshestvie na rodinu), feature film directed by Andrei Khrzhanovsky; a fictionalized account of Brodsky's life.
- 2015 – Brodsky is not a Poet (Бродский не поэт, Brodskiy ne poet), documentary film by Ilia Belov on Brodsky's stay in the States.
- 2018 – Dovlatov (Довлатов), biographical film about writer Sergei Dovlatov (who was Joseph Brodsky's friend) directed by Aleksei German-junior; film is set in 1971 in Leningrad shortly before Brodsky's emigration and Brodsky plays an important role.

== In music ==
The 2011 contemporary classical album Troika includes Eskender Bekmambetov's critically acclaimed, song cycle "there ...", set to five of Joseph's Brodsky's Russian-language poems and his own translations of the poems into English. Victoria Poleva wrote Summer music (2008), a chamber cantata based on the verses by Brodsky for violin solo, children choir and Strings and Ars moriendi (1983–2012), 22 monologues about death for soprano and piano (two monologues based on the verses by Brodsky ("Song" and "Empty circle").

== Collections in Russian ==
- 1965: Stikhotvoreniia i poemy, Washington, D.C.: Inter-Language Literary Associates
- 1970: Ostanovka v pustyne, New York: Izdatel'stvo imeni Chekhova (Rev. ed. Ann Arbor, Mich.: Ardis, 1989)
- 1977: Chast' rechi: Stikhotvoreniia 1972–76, Ann Arbor, Mich.: Ardis
- 1977: Konets prekrasnoi epokhi : stikhotvoreniia 1964–71, Ann Arbor, Mich.: Ardis
- 1977: V Anglii, Ann Arbor, Mich.: Ardis
- 1982: Rimskie elegii, New York: Russica
- 1983: Novye stansy k Avguste : stikhi k M.B., 1962–1982, Ann Arbor, Mich.: Ardis
- 1984: Mramor, Ann Arbor, Mich.: Ardis
- 1984: Uraniia : Novaia kniga stikhov, Ann Arbor, Mich.: Ardis
- 1989: Ostanovka v pustyne, revised edition, Ann Arbor, Mich.: Ardis, 1989 (original edition: New York: Izdatel'stvo imeni Chekhova, 1970)
- 1990: Nazidanie : stikhi 1962–1989, Leningrad: Smart
- 1990: Chast' rechi : Izbrannye stikhi 1962–1989, Moscow: Khudozhestvennaia literatura
- 1990: Osennii krik iastreba : Stikhotvoreniia 1962–1989, Leningrad: KTP LO IMA Press
- 1990: Primechaniia paporotnika, Bromma, Sweden : Hylaea
- 1991: Ballada o malen'kom buksire, Leningrad: Detskaia literatura
- 1991: Kholmy : Bol'shie stikhotvoreniia i poemy, Saint Petersburg: LP VTPO "Kinotsentr"
- 1991: Stikhotvoreniia, Tallinn: Eesti Raamat
- 1992: Naberezhnaia neistselimykh: Trinadtsat' essei, Moscow: Slovo
- 1992: Rozhdestvenskie stikhi, Moscow: Nezavisimaia gazeta (revised edition in 1996)
- 1992–1995: Sochineniia, Saint Petersburg: Pushkinskii fond, 1992–1995, four volumes
- 1992: Vspominaia Akhmatovu / Joseph Brodsky, Solomon Volkov, Moscow: Nezavisimaia gazeta
- 1992: Forma vremeni : stikhotvoreniia, esse, p'esy, Minsk: Eridan, two volumes
- 1993: Kappadokiia.–Saint Petersburg
- 1994: Persian Arrow/Persidskaia strela, with etchings by Edik Steinberg.–Verona: * Edizione d'Arte Gibralfaro & ECM
- 1995: Peresechennaia mestnost ': Puteshestviia s kommentariiami, Moscow: Nezavisimaia gazeta
- 1995: V okrestnostiakh Atlantidy : Novye stikhotvoreniia, Saint Petersburg: Pushkinskii fond
- 1996: Peizazh s navodneniem, compiled by Aleksandr Sumerkin. Dana Point, Cal.: Ardis
- 1996: Rozhdestvenskie stikhi, Moscow: Nezavisimaia gazeta, revised edition of a work originally published in 1992
- 1997: Brodskii o Tsvetaevoi, Moscow: Nezavisimaia gazeta
- 1998: Pis'mo Goratsiiu, Moscow: Nash dom
- 1996 and after: Sochineniia, Saint Petersburg: Pushkinskii fond, eight volumes
- 1999: Gorbunov i Gorchakov, Saint Petersburg: Pushkinskii fond
- 1999: Predstavlenie : novoe literaturnoe obozrenie, Moscow
- 2000: Ostanovka v pustyne, Saint Petersburg: Pushkinskii fond
- 2000: Chast' rechi, Saint Petersburg: Pushkinskii fond
- 2000: Konets prekrasnoi epokhi, Saint Petersburg: Pushkinskii fond
- 2000: Novye stansy k Avguste, Saint Petersburg: Pushkinskii fond
- 2000: Uraniia, Saint Petersburg: Pushkinskii fond
- 2000: Peizazh s navodneniem, Saint Petersburg: Pushkinskii fond
- 2000: Bol'shaia kniga interv'iu, Moscow: Zakharov
- 2001: Novaia Odisseia : Pamiati Iosifa Brodskogo, Moscow: Staroe literaturnoe obozrenie
- 2001: Peremena imperii : Stikhotvoreniia 1960–1996, Moscow: Nezavisimaia gazeta
- 2001: Vtoroi vek posle nashei ery : dramaturgija Iosifa Brodskogo, Saint Petersburg: Zvezda

== See also ==
- List of American Nobel laureates
- List of Jewish Nobel laureates
- List of Russian Nobel laureates
