= Rona Jaffe Foundation Writers' Award =

Literary award

The Rona Jaffe Foundation Writers' Award was an award given annually to beginning women writers. Established in 1995 by American author Rona Jaffe, the Foundation offers grants to writers of poetry, fiction, and creative nonfiction. The award was discontinued in March 2021; the foundation cited the high cost of administering the award as the main factor.

Recipients of the award were selected through nominations only. Past recipients include Aryn Kyle, Emily Rapp, and ZZ Packer.

== Winners ==
Year	Winner	Genre
2020	Hannah Bae	Nonfiction
2020	Mari Christmas	Fiction
2020	Yalitza Ferreras	Fiction
2020	Temim Fruchter	Fiction
2020	Elisa Gonzalez	Poetry
2020	Charleen McClure	Poetry
2019	Selena Anderson	Fiction
2019	Magogodi oaMphela Makhene	Fiction
2019	Sarah Passino	Poetry
2019	Nicolette Polek	Fiction
2019	Elizabeth Schambelan	Nonfiction
2019	Debbie Urbanski	Fiction/Nonfiction
2018	Chelsea Bieker	Fiction/Nonfiction
2018	Lisa Chen	Nonfiction
2018	Lydi Conklin (Note: As Lydia Conklin)	Fiction
2018	Gabriela Garcia	Fiction
2018	Karen Outen	Fiction/Nonfiction
2018	Alison C. Rollins	Poetry
2017	Ama Codjoe	Poetry
2017	Ebony Flowers	Fiction/Nonfiction
2017	Tiana Nobile	Poetry
2017	Dominica Phetteplace	Fiction
2017	Shawna Kay Rodenberg	Nonfiction
2017	Aamina Ahmad	Fiction
2016	Lina María Ferreira Cabeza-Vanegas	Nonfiction
2016	Danielle Geller	Nonfiction
2016	Jamey Hatley	Fiction
2016	Ladee Hubbard	Fiction
2016	Airea D. Matthews	Poetry
2016	Asako Serizawa	Fiction
2015	Meehan Crist	Nonfiction
2015	Vanessa Hua	Fiction
2015	Ashley M. Jones	Poetry
2015	Britteney Black Rose Kapri	Poetry
2015	Amanda Rea	Fiction
2015	Natalie Haney Tilghman	Fiction
2014	Olivia Clare	Fiction
2014	Karen Hays	Nonfiction
2014	Danielle Jones-Pruett	Poetry
2014	T. L. Khleif	Fiction
2014	Mara Naselli	Nonfiction
2014	Solmaz Sharif	Poetry
2013	Tiffany Briere	Fiction; Nonfiction
2013	Ashlee Crews	Fiction
2013	Kristin Dombek	Nonfiction
2013	Margaree Little	Poetry
2013	Kirstin Valdez Quade	Fiction
2013	Jill Sisson Quinn	Nonfiction
2012	Julia Elliott	Fiction
2012	Christina Nichol	Fiction
2012	Lauren Goodwin Slaughter	Poetry
2012	Rachel Swearingen	Fiction
2012	Kim Tingley	Nonfiction
2012	Inara Verzemnieks	Nonfiction
2011	Melanie Drane	Poetry
2011	Apricot Irving	Nonfiction
2011	Fowzia Karimi	Fiction
2011	Namwali Serpell	Fiction
2011	Merritt Tierce	Fiction
2011	JoAnn Wypijewski	Nonfiction
2010	Hannah Dela Cruz Abrams	Nonfiction
2010	Rachel Aviv	Nonfiction
2010	Sara Elizabeth Johnson	Poetry
2010	Alexandria Marzano-Lesnevich	Nonfiction
2010	Laura Newbern	Poetry
2010	Tiphanie Yanique	Fiction
2009	Krista Bremer	Nonfiction
2009	Vievee Francis	Poetry
2009	Janice N. Harrington	Poetry
2009	Lori Ostlund	Fiction
2009	Helen Phillips	Fiction
2009	Heidy Steidlmayer	Poetry
2008	Jennifer Culkin	Nonfiction
2008	Joanne Dominique Dwyer	Poetry
2008	Amy Leach	Nonfiction
2008	Jolie Lewis	Fiction
2008	Hasanthika Sirisena	Fiction
2008	Therese Stanton	Fiction
2007	Elif Batuman	Nonfiction; Fiction
2007	Sarah Braunstein	Fiction
2007	Robin Ekiss	Poetry
2007	Alma García	Fiction
2007	Jennifer Grotz	Poetry
2007	Holly Goddard Jones	Fiction
2006	Rivka Galchen	Fiction
2006	Ellen Litman	Fiction
2006	Melissa Range	Poetry
2006	Emily Rapp	Fiction; Nonfiction
2006	Rita Mae Reese	Fiction; Poetry
2006	Sharifa Rhodes-Pitts	Nonfiction
2005	Nan Cohen	Poetry
2005	Averill Curdy	Poetry
2005	Rebecca Curtis	Fiction
2005	Frances Hwang	Fiction
2005	Aryn Kyle	Fiction
2005	Asali Solomon	Fiction
2004	Carin Clevidence	Nonfiction
2004	Ann Harleman	Fiction
2004	Dana Levin	Poetry
2004	Michele Morano	Nonfiction
2004	Tracy K. Smith	Poetry
2004	Sharan Strange	Poetry
2003	Kathleen Graber	Poetry
2003	Joanna Klink	Poetry
2003	Allison McKittrick	Fiction
2003	Katharine Noel	Fiction
2003	Olette Trouvé	Fiction
2003	Julia Whitty	Nonfiction; Fiction
2002	Eula Biss	Nonfiction; Poetry
2002	Adrian Blevins	Poetry
2002	Gabrielle Calvocoressi	Poetry
2002	Ladette Randolph	Nonfiction; Fiction
2002	L.B. Thompson	Poetry
2002	Kellie Wells	Fiction
2001	Glen Chamberlain	Nonfiction; Fiction
2001	Constance Merritt	Poetry
2001	Catie Rosemurgy	Poetry
2001	Jennie Erin Smith	Fiction
2001	Mary Sullivan	Fiction
2001	Karen Whalley	Poetry
2000	Trudy Dittmar	Nonfiction
2000	Amy Havel	Fiction
2000	Joanie V. Mackowski	Poetry
2000	Leslie Ryan	Nonfiction
2000	Julia Slavin	Fiction
2000	Lisa Russ Spaar	Poetry
1999	Samina Ali	Fiction
1999	Stephanie Grant	Fiction
1999	Ann Claremont Le Zotte	Poetry
1999	Kathleen Lee	Fiction
1999	Malena Mörling	Poetry
1999	Shao Wei	Nonfiction; Poetry
1999	Michelle Tea	Fiction
1998	Marilyn Abildskov	Nonfiction
1998	Jody Bolz	Poetry
1998	Lan Samantha Chang	Fiction
1998	Megan Foss	Nonfiction
1998	Stephanie Gunn	Fiction
1998	Ellen Hinsey	Poetry
1998	Marjorie Sandor	Fiction
1998	Larissa Szporluk	Poetry
1997	Bay Anapol	Fiction
1997	Karen E. Bender	Fiction
1997	Honorée F. Jeffers	Poetry
1997	Rebecca Lee	Fiction
1997	ZZ Packer	Fiction
1997	Marisa de los Santos	Poetry
1997	Ellen Doré Watson	Poetry
1997	Anne Winters	Poetry
1996	Marina Budhos	Fiction
1996	Olena Kalytiak Davis	Poetry
1996	Tory Dent	Nonfiction; Poetry
1996	Laura Mullen	Poetry
1996	Eileen Pollack	Nonfiction; Fiction
1996	Mary Szybist	Poetry
1996	Lois-Ann Yamanaka	Fiction
1996	Angela Yuan	Poetry
1995	Erin Belieu	Poetry
1995	Judy Budnitz	Fiction
1995	Tina De Rosa	Nonfiction; Fiction
1995	Chaney Holland	Fiction
1995	Julie Kalendek	Poetry
1995	Karen Kelley	Poetry
1995	Susan Swartwout	Poetry
