= Jeffrey Levine =

Jeffrey Levine may refer to:

- Jeffrey Levine (poet), American poet, publisher, musician, and attorney
- Jeffrey D. Levine (born 1955), United States Ambassador to Estonia
- Jeffrey Levine (composer) (born 1942), American composer and double-bassist
