= Amy Leach =

Amy Leach may refer to:

- Amy Leach (theatre director) (born 1981), British theatre director
- Amy Leach (writer), American non-fiction writer
