= Kellie Wells =

Kellie Wells may refer to:

- Kellie Wells (athlete) (born 1982), American track and field athlete
- Kellie Wells (writer), American novelist and short story writer

== See also ==
- Wells Kelly, musician
