= Colrain Poetry Manuscript Conference =

Literary conference

The Colrain Poetry Manuscript Conference is a writers' conference focused entirely on book-length and chapbook-length poetry manuscripts. Founded and directed by poet Joan Houlihan, the conference is held 9-10 times a year in locations around the United States. It provides reviews and feedback from publishers, editors, and poets to help poets get their manuscripts published. Participating publishers have included Graywolf Press, Four Way Books, Persea Books, Omnidawn, Barrow Street Press, while poets and editors have included Joan Houlihan (Lesley University), Fred Marchant (Suffolk University), and Ellen Doré Watson (Smith College).

== See also ==
- List of writers' conferences
