= Adélia Prado =

Brazilian writer and poet (born 1935)

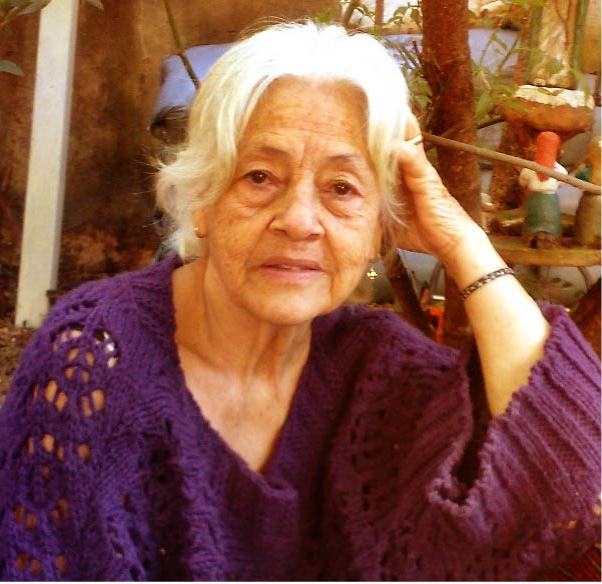
- Adélia Prado in 2014, the year she won the Griffin Lifetime Recognition Award.
- Born: 13 December 1935 (age 90); Divinópolis, Minas Gerais
- Occupation: Poet
- Writing career
- Language: Portuguese
- Genre: Poetry

Adélia Luzia Prado Freitas (born 13 December 1935) is a Brazilian writer and poet.

== Life ==
She was born in Divinópolis, Minas Gerais (one of the landlocked states of Brazil), where she still lives. Her family were railroad laborers, and both her mother and grandmother died during childbirth. She was the first member of her family to attend university, gaining degrees in Philosophy and Religious Education from the University of Divinópolis. She taught school until 1979, and was the Cultural Liaison for the City of Divinópolis from 1983 to 1988.

== Literary career ==
Her poetry was "discovered" in 1976, when at the age of 40 she sent a small collection of her poems to poet Affonso Romano de Sant’Anna. De Sant'Anna passed her work on to the Brazilian modernist poet Carlos Drummond de Andrade, who read it and proclaimed in his weekly newspaper column that St. Francis was dictating lines to a housewife in Minas Gerais. Her work is a seeming paradox of a deep and spiritual Catholicism combined with the physical and the carnal. She herself has tried to resolve this contradiction, writing that "It's the soul that's erotic." She is especially focused on the everyday concerns of women. Adélia has published eight volumes of poetry and seven volumes of prose, starting with her first poetry collection Bagagem (Baggage). In describing her work, Robert Hass said "Brazil has produced what might seem impossible: a really sexy, mystical, Catholic poet."

Though she does her best to avoid the limelight, Prado is considered one of Brazil's foremost poets. Her work has been translated into English, Italian, and Spanish, and has been written about extensively in the critical and popular press in Brazil.

Adélia Prado has a long relationship with American poet and translator Ellen Doré Watson, who has translated several collections of Prado's poetry. They are:

- The Alphabet in the Park: Selected Poems of Adélia Prado (Wesleyan University Press, 1990)
- Ex-Voto: Poems of Adélia Prado (Tupelo Press, 2013)
- The Mystical Rose: Selected Poems (Bloodaxe Books, 2014)

Prado's work has also been published in translation in The Paris Review, Antaeus, Field, and American Poetry Review. It has been included in The Ecco Anthology of International Poetry and The Farrar Straus Giroux Book of Twentieth Century Latin American Poetry.

== Awards and recognitions ==
The Brazilian National Library's Jornal de Poesia (Poetry Journal) polled intellectuals in 1998 to compile A Lista Dos 20 (the "List of Twenty") foremost living poets. Prado ranked fourth.

In 2000, Adélia was featured in the prestigious Brazilian "Cadernos de Literatura Brasileira" produced by the Moreira Salles Institute.

Prado was a featured reader at FLIP (Paraty International Literary Festival) in 2006, an event that drew large interest to her work.

In 2014, she received the Griffin Lifetime Recognition Award, presented by the trustees of the Griffin Poetry Prize.

In 2024 she was awarded the Camões Prize.
