= Anne Winters =

Anne Winters may refer to:

- Anne Winters (poet), poet and professor at the University of Illinois at Chicago
- Anne Winters (actress) (born 1994), American actress
