= Membery =

Poetry collection by Preeti Kaur Rajpal

membery
- Author: Preeti Kaur Rajpal
- Genre: Poetry
- Publisher: Tupelo Press
- Publication date: November 2023
- Pages: 118
- ISBN: 978-1-946482-98-3

Membery (stylized in lowercase) is the 2023 debut poetry collection of Preeti Kaur Rajpal, published by Tupelo Press.

== Form ==
The collection explores memory and Sikh spirituality in the context of India's Partition and the post-9/11 American Sikh experience. Structured in four udaasis, like Guru Nanak's spiritual journeys, the poems weave Rajpal's experiences growing up in the San Joaquin Valley with her immigrant grandparents.

== Critical reception ==
Calling it a "clever debut," Publishers Weekly stated the book "launches the reader into a spiritual journey through an ars poetica of social justice" and lauded its mastery of both experimental forms and lyricism as means of interrogating history.

Pedestal Magazine called it "haunting," praising how Rajpal "follows the etymology of words and definitions like a road map to truth" and concluding that "the consequences of diaspora live on equally in the DNA and collective memories of its descendants."

Compulsive Reader wrote that it "reads like a piece of art" and praised its cohesion.
