= Asali Solomon =

American professor, author, and novelist

- Born: Philadelphia
- Education: Barnard College; University of California, Berkeley (PhD); University of Iowa (MFA)
- Occupations: Author, writer
- Children: 2
- Writing career
- Notable work: Disgruntled (2015)
- Notable awards: Rona Jaffe Foundation Writers' Award (2005)

Asali Solomon is an American professor, author, and novelist. She grew up in West Philadelphia, and attended Henry C. Lea Elementary, The Baldwin School in Bryn Mawr, Pennsylvania, and graduated from Central High School. In 2007, she was named a 5 under 35 honoree.

== Biography ==
Solomon attended Barnard College as an undergraduate, and received a Ph.D. in English from UC Berkeley. After her Ph.D., she went on to receive an MFA from the University of Iowa in Fiction. She is currently an Associate Professor of English at Haverford College. Before working at Haverford, she was affiliated with Washington and Lee University and Trinity College.

Solomon has published three books. Her first, Get Down, was a collection of short stories published in 2008. She published her second book, a novel titled Disgruntled, in 2015. Disgruntled was well received by critics. Days of Afrekete appeared in 2021; loosely analogous to Virginia Woolf's Mrs. Dalloway with references to Audre Lorde's Zami, it too received favorable reviews.

== Bibliography ==
- Get Down (2008)
- Disgruntled (Farrar, Straus and Giroux, 2015)
- Days of Afrekete (Farra, Straus and Giroux, 2021)
