= Eileen Pollack =

American novelist

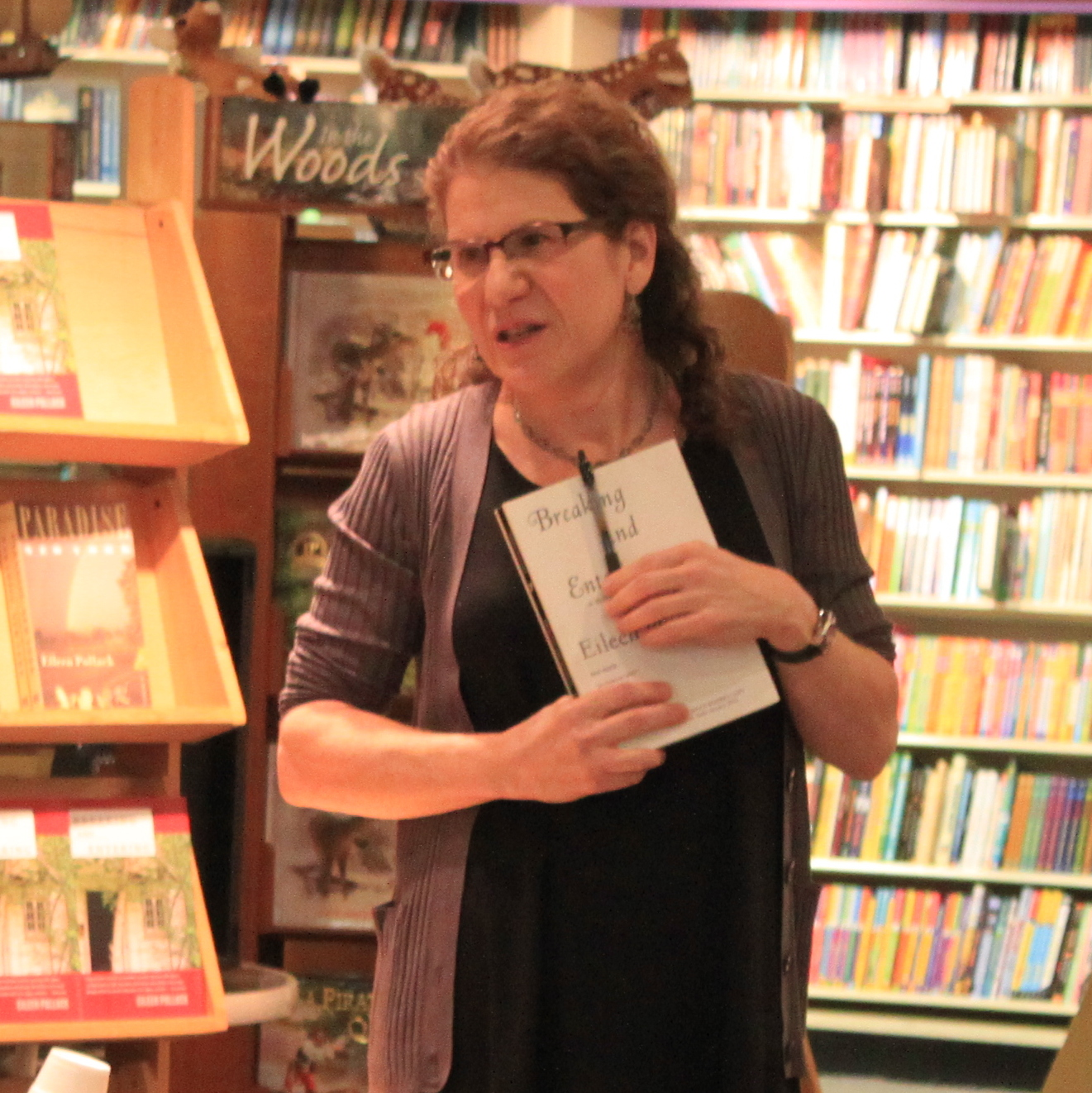
- Pollack at a book signing event in Ann Arbor, Michigan, January 2012
- Born: 1956 (age 69–70)
- Education: Yale University; University of Iowa (MFA)
- Occupations: Novelist; essayist; short story writer
- Writing career
- Notable awards: Rona Jaffe Foundation Writers' Award (1996)
- Website: eileenpollack.com

Eileen Pollack (born 1956) is an American novelist, essayist, and short story writer. She is the former director of the Master of Fine Arts Program at the University of Michigan. Pollack holds an undergraduate degree in Physics from Yale University and an M.F.A in creative writing from the University of Iowa. She received the Rona Jaffe Foundation Writers' Award in 1996.

She currently divides her time between Ann Arbor, Michigan, and Manhattan.

Pollack's The Rabbi in the Attic and Other Stories (1991) features an Old-World male rabbi and his leftist female successor, and is among the early works of American Jewish literature to prominently feature the inclusion of women rabbis as literary figures.

== Works ==
- The Rabbi in the Attic
- Paradise, New York
- "In the Mouth"
- "Woman Walking Ahead: In Search of Catherine Weldon and Sitting Bull"
- Breaking and Entering
- The Only Woman in the Room: Why Science Is Still a Boys' Club
- A Perfect Life
