= Debbie Urbanski =

American author

- Born: Chicago, Illinois, U.S.
- Education: Carleton College (BA); Syracuse University (MFA)
- Occupation: Writer
- Writing career
- Genres: Science fiction; fantasy; horror; climate fiction; essays
- Website: debbieurbanski.com

Debbie Urbanski is an American author best known for her speculative prose and fantastical realism. Her debut novel After World (Simon & Schuster, 2023) explores human extinction and climate change from the perspective of an artificial intelligence. Her work has been featured in several anthologies including The Best American Science Fiction and Fantasy, The Best American Experimental Writing, and The Year's Greatest Science Fiction and Fantasy. Her debut collection of short stories, Portalmania, was published in May 2025 by Simon & Schuster.

== Early life ==
Urbanski grew up in Chicago and Orland Park, Illinois. She is a graduate of Carleton College and the Creative Writing M.F.A. Program of Syracuse University.

== Career ==
Early in her career, Urbanski wrote poetry, but eventually transitioned to short stories and essays. For several years she wrote for children and teens, publishing numerous stories in Highlights as well as Cricket Media's Spider and Cicada magazines. Working with editor Jestine Ware, Urbanski wrote what became Spider's first LGBTQIA+ story about a hiking trip taken by a family with two moms. She began publishing genre work in 2012 with the short story "Wonder" in Interzone, and she is now listed in The Encyclopedia of Science Fiction.

In 2019 she was awarded a Rona Jaffe Foundation Writers' Award for fiction and nonfiction.

== Selected works ==
=== After World ===
In Urbanski's debut novel After World (Simon & Schuster, 2023), humans have gone extinct to save the planet, and an artificial intelligence is tasked with telling the story of what happened to the last human on Earth. The story takes place in Syracuse, New York, (where Urbanski lives now with her family) and in the New York State Forests south of Syracuse. After World was named a best book of the year by the San Francisco Chronicle, Strange Horizons, the Los Angeles Times, Engadget, and Booklist; was a New York Public Library Book of the Day; and was a Climate Reality Project book club pick. After World won the 2025 Association for the Study of Literature and Environment Creative Writing Book Award, with the judges commenting: "The novel’s formal inventiveness serves its thematic concerns perfectly, creating a work that is simultaneously a love letter to the natural world, a requiem for human civilization, and a plea for the unique value of human life."

=== Portalmania ===
The short stories in Portalmania, Urbanski's 2025 debut collection, span across science fiction, fantasy, horror, and realism and touch upon themes of motherhood, relationships, asexuality, and love. Portalmania received positive reviews in The Wall Street Journal, Publishers Weekly, the Chicago Review of Books, and The Massachusetts Review. Locus Magazine wrote: "Every story in Portalmania is distinctive, vital, and sophisticated; the whole is an almost perfectly constructed debut collection that brings into sharp focus an impressively cohesive project."
