= Nicolette Polek =

Slovak-American author

Nicolette Polek is a Slovak-American fiction writer and essayist.. She is the author of the novel Bitter Water Opera, the short story collection Imaginary Museums, which was longlisted for the 2021 PEN/Robert W. Bingham Prize for Debut Short Story Collections. She is a recipient of the 2019 Rona Jaffe Foundation Writers' Award.

== Early life and education ==
Polek grew up in Northeast Ohio. She holds a BA from Bennington College and an MA in Religion and Literature from Yale Divinity School. She has held teaching positions at Sarah Lawrence College, Bennington College, SUNY Purchase, and elsewhere.

== Writing career ==
Nicolette Polek's first short story collection, Imaginary Museums, was published by Soft Skull Press on January 14, 2020. The book contains 26 short stories organized into four sections. The stories reveal the unsettling strangeness beneath ordinary experience, and capture overlooked moments in human relationships, often through brief, sometimes satirical snapshots of ordinary life. The collection was longlisted for the 2021 PEN/Robert W. Bingham Prize for Debut Short Story Collections.

Her debut novel, Bitter Water Opera, was published by Graywolf Press in April 2024. The novel follows Gia, a film scholar who becomes infatuated by the deceased dancer Marta Becket, who mysteriously appears after Gia writes her a letter. The novel incorporates religious mysticism and Christian imagery into its exploration of solitude and artistic creation. In its review, The New Yorker praised Polek's treatment of transcendence in everyday life, describing the novel as "an ode to small and privately felt moments of beauty”

Polek's second novel, Ackermann, will be published by Astra House on February 23, 2027

== Critical reception ==
Imaginary Museums received a mixed review from Maya Chung in The New York Times Book Review, who praised Polek's "keen eye for the absurd" and wrote that her imagery "comes through like flashes in a silent film". Publishers' Weekly observed that in the stories the "mundane is made very strange".

Bitter Water Opera received critical attention for its treatment of religious experience and artistic inspiration. In Los Angeles Review of Books, Brittany Menjivar argued that "the book's structure mirrors traditional journeys of faith". Writing in Columbia Journal, Ali Banach argued that the fragmented structure reinforces its religious themes, describing the readers imaginative participation in the novel's gaps as "an act of faith". Hayley J. Clark, in The Paris Review, examined the novel's treatment of spiritual emptiness, and the protagonist's attempt to find a model for living in Marta Becket.

== Bibliography ==
=== Books ===
- Imaginary Museums. Soft Skull Press, 2020.
- Bitter Water Opera. Graywolf Press, 2024.
- Ackermann. Astra House, forthcoming 2027.

=== Selected shorter works ===
- "The Last Stop and the Book of Revelation" (The Paris Review, 2022) — Essay.
- "Messages with the Supplicant" (Granta, 2023) — Fiction.
- "Outdoor Day" (The Atlantic, 2023) — Poetry.
- "Sherlock's Double: At William Gillette's Castle]" (The Paris Review, 2024) — Essay.
- "Liquid Papers" (Harper's Magazine, 2024) — Fiction.
- "Hildegard, Tarkovsky, Citrus Trees" (The Paris Review, 2026) — Essay.
