= Whiting Foundation =

American private foundation

- Founded: 1973
- Founder: Flora Ettlinger Whiting
- Type: Private foundation
- Headquarters: New York, New York, U.S.
- Key people: Constantia Constantinou (executive director)
- Website: www.whiting.org

The Whiting Foundation (legally the Mrs. Giles Whiting Foundation) is an American private foundation based in New York City. Founded in 1973 through a bequest from Flora Ettlinger Whiting, it makes grants in literature and the humanities. The foundation is known for administering the Whiting Awards, annual grants to emerging writers.

== History ==
Mrs. Flora Whiting died in 1971, and a contemporaneous report in The New York Times identified the Mrs. Giles Whiting Foundation as one of the principal beneficiaries of her estate. The Bookseller reported that the foundation has funded humanities work since 1973. According to the foundation, its first program was the Whiting Dissertation Fellowship, which ran from 1973 to 2015. In 1985, it established the Whiting Awards.

== Programs ==
The foundation's literary programs include the Whiting Awards, which are given annually to ten emerging writers in fiction, nonfiction, poetry, and drama.

The Whiting Nonfiction Grant for Works-in-Progress began in 2016. In 2022, The Bookseller reported that the program expanded from eight United States writers to ten writers and opened to applicants from Britain and Canada with qualifying publishing contracts. The program is now titled the Whiting Nonfiction Grant for Works-in-Progress.

The foundation launched the Whiting Literary Magazine Prizes in 2017. Publishers Weekly reported that the program was revised in 2023, when the foundation moved to awarding cohorts of magazines on a three-year cycle and changed eligibility rules and grant amounts.

Beyond its literary programs, the foundation's grantmaking has included dissertation and teaching fellowships, public engagement programs for humanities scholars, and more recent grants in high-school humanities and cultural heritage preservation.

== Organization ==
In December 2024, Constantia Constantinou was appointed executive director, succeeding Daniel Reid.

According to ProPublica's Nonprofit Explorer, the foundation reported $5,300,964 in revenue, $4,811,750 in expenses, and $75,886,402 in total assets for fiscal year 2024.

== See also ==
- Whiting Awards
