= Shao Wei (poet) =

American poet (born 1965)

- 邵薇
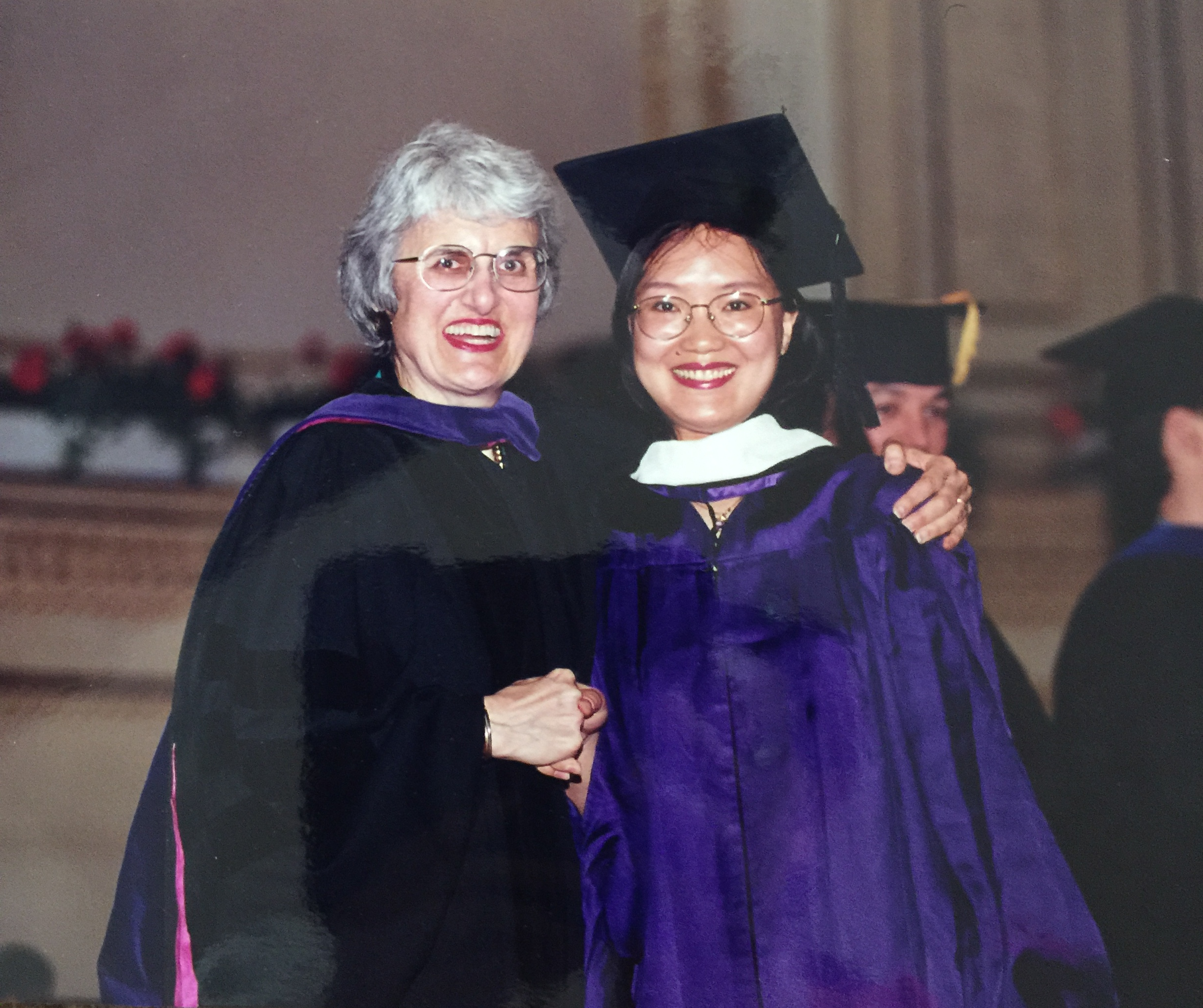
- Born: Wanzhou District, China
- Education: PhD MFA
- Alma mater: New York University; University of Texas at Austin; University of Texas at Dallas
- Occupation: Teaching
- Writing career
- Language: Chinese (Mandarin), English
- Genres: Poetry Nonfiction Memoir
- Notable awards: 2002 Agnes Lynch Starrett Poetry Prize; 2000 New York Foundation for the Arts; 1999 Rona Jaffe Foundation Writers' Award
- Website: wendyshao7.wixsite.com

Shao Wei (born 1965) is a Chinese-American poet and memoir author.

== Life ==
Shao was born in 1965 and grew up by the Yangtze River in the city of Wanxian, later renamed to the Wanzhou District, Chongqing after the construction of the Three-Gorges Dam. Her parents divorced when she was young, and she lived mostly with her grandfather as an only child. She would see travelers in passing-by ships, which caused her to desire the freedom to travel. Living a frugal life and with not much to enjoy, she would take pleasure in reading books and watching Peking Opera.

At the age of 16, she would go to Chongqing to attend college and major in English. She finished graduate study in China in 1991 and took the Test of English as a Foreign Language and Graduate Record Examinations. In 1996 she received a scholarship to study at New York University (NYU) and came to the U.S. as a graduate student. She credits her professor Galway Kinnell for encouraging her to keep writing poetry through many difficult situations in her new life and to break through her old consciousness of poetry writing. She graduated from New York University with an M.A., an MFA from the Michener Center for Writers at University of Texas at Austin, and Ph.D. in the School of Arts & Humanities at University of Texas at Dallas. She taught Introductory Creative Writing at UT Dallas, and formerly taught at the College of New Rochelle, Rosa Parks Campus, and Chinese at the China Institute, in New York City. She currently teaches three Chinese courses at Cal State Fullerton.

Her work appears in Parnassus, Crab Orchard Review, Seneca Review, 5 AM,

== Awards ==
- 2002 Agnes Lynch Starrett Poetry Prize
- 2000 New York Foundation for the Arts
- 1999 Rona Jaffe Foundation Writers' Award

== Works ==
=== Poetry ===
- "Horse Riding"; "Chasing in the Wind", Homestead Review
- "Spirit of Butterflies Lovers, Story of A Chinese Classic Music", Brooklyn Rail, May 2001
- Pulling a Dragon's Teeth. University of Pittsburgh Press. 2003. ISBN 978-0-8229-5835-2.
- Nine Songs. Females, a poetry collection published in Chinese

=== Non fiction ===
- Culture Bird: Looking for Myself in New York, Beijing, Guangming Daily Publishing House, 2001
- "Homeland", Taipei, Taiwan New Century Publishing House, 2011
