= Emily Rapp Black =

American poet (born 1974)

Emily Susan Rapp Black
- Born: Emily Susan Rapp; July 12, 1974 (age 52); Grand Island, Nebraska, U.S.
- Education: Harvard University, University of Texas-Austin, Trinity College-Dublin, St. Olaf College: Master of Theological Studies; Bachelor's degree in religion and women's studies; Masters of Fine Arts degree in creative writing
- Alma mater: Harvard University; Saint Olaf College; Trinity College, Dublin; University of Texas at Austin
- Occupation: Author
- Writing career
- Genre: Memoir
- Notable awards: Fulbright Fellowship; James A. Michener Fellowship; Rona Jaffe Foundation Writers' Award
- Website: www.emilyrappblackauthor.com

Emily Rapp Black (born July 12, 1974) is an American memoir author. When she was six years old, she was chosen as the poster child for the non-profit organization March of Dimes, due to a congenital birth defect that resulted in the amputation of her left leg. She has written two memoirs, one that presents her life as an amputee and the other that tells the story of the birth of her son Ronan Christopher Louis and his diagnosis of Tay–Sachs disease. She is a former Fulbright scholar and recipient of the James A. Michener Fellowship. She is a professor at the University of California, Riverside, School of Medicine.

== Personal background ==
=== Early life ===
Emily Susan Rapp was born on July 12, 1974, in Grand Island, Nebraska. Rapp was raised in Laramie, Wyoming; Kearney, Nebraska; and Denver, Colorado; by her father, a Lutheran pastor, and her mother, a school nurse. With her second husband, Rick Louis, she had a son, Ronan Christopher Louis, born on March 24, 2010, who died of Tay-Sachs disease on February 15, 2013. She and her third husband, Kent Black, lived in Madrid, New Mexico, before moving to Redlands, California, where they reside with their daughter, Charlotte (Charlie).

=== Education ===
In 1996, Rapp received a Fulbright Fellowship to Seoul, South Korea. She was educated at Saint Olaf College, where she received a Bachelor of Arts in religion and women's studies; Harvard University, where she received a Master of Theological Studies; Trinity College, Dublin; and the University of Texas at Austin, where she was a James A. Michener Fellow and received her Masters of Fine Arts degree in creative writing.

== Professional background ==
Before entering divinity school, Rapp worked in Geneva, Switzerland; Namibia; Hong Kong and Bangkok, Thailand for the Women's Desk of the Lutheran World Federation, an international relief organization.

=== Poster Child ===
In 2007, Rapp published her first memoir, Poster Child, with Bloomsbury, detailing her life as an amputee. She wrote, "[The] notion, that happiness and fulfillment hinge upon radical transformation, has followed me throughout my life. From an early age, I had fantasies of being 'healed' of my disability, a miracle I envisioned as rather more Disney than biblical."

=== The Still Point of the Turning World ===
In 2013, her book The Still Point of the Turning World was published by Penguin Press. The book shares the author's life and experiences following her son Ronan Christopher Louis's diagnosis at nine months old with Tay–Sachs disease. The book was widely and warmly reviewed, including in the Los Angeles Times, The Boston Globe, and The New York Times, and was chosen by amazon.com as a Best Book of the Month for March 2013. On March 8, 2013, Rapp appeared on The Today Show to speak about her book, along with her many other public appearances, including a return to Fresh Air with Terry Gross on NPR.

=== Short stories, poems, and essays ===
Rapp's short stories, poems, or essays have appeared in The New York Times, the Los Angeles Times, Salon.com, The Sun, The Texas Observer, The Rumpus, and Body & Soul, among other publications. She has kept her own blog, Little Seal, and she has been a regular columnist for the blog Role/Reboot.

Rapp has received many awards for her work, including recognition from The Atlantic Monthly, StoryQuarterly, The Huffington Post, Time magazine, the Mary Roberts Rinehart Foundation, the Jentel Arts Foundation, the Corporation of Yaddo, the Fine Arts Work Center in Provincetown, Massachusetts, and the Valparaiso Foundation, among others.

=== Teaching ===
Rapp has taught writing in the MFA program at Antioch University Los Angeles; the Taos Writers' Workshop in New Mexico; the MFA program at the University of California, Riverside; and the Gotham Writers' Workshop. She is currently an assistant professor at UC Riverside School of Medicine. She travels frequently to schools and universities to talk about issues of the body, illness, and the creative process.

== Board memberships ==
From 1989 to 2003 she served on various boards and committees of the Evangelical Lutheran Church in America, including the Committee on the Status of Women and the Global Mission Board of Directors.

== Honors and awards ==
- 2004: James A. Michener Fellowship at the University of Texas-Austin.
- 2005: Philip Roth Writer-in-Residence at Bucknell University
- 2006: Rona Jaffe Foundation Writers' Award
- 2012: Rapp's essay, "Transformation and Transcendence: The Power of Female Friendship", was named "one of 25 pieces that should be required reading for women" by The Huffington Post.
- 2012: Rapp's blog, Little Seal, was named by Time magazine as one of the 25 best blogs in 2012.
- 2013: Named by the Los Angeles Times as one of the "Faces to Watch"
- 2013: Rapp's second memoir, The Still Point in the Turning World, was chosen as a Best Book of the Month in March by Amazon.

== Books ==
- Rapp, Emily (2007). Poster Child: A Memoir, Bloomsbury USA/Macmillan, 240 pages. ISBN 978-1596912564
- Rapp, Emily (2013). The Still Point of the Turning World, Penguin Press, 272 pages. ISBN 978-1594205125
- Rapp, Emily (2021). Frida Kahlo and My Left Leg, Notting Hill Editions, 200 pages. ISBN 978-1912559268
- Rapp, Emily (2026). I Would Die If I Were You: Notes on Art and Truth-Telling, 288 pages. ISBN 978-1-64009-689-9
