= Merritt Tierce =

American writer and activist

Merritt Tierce is an American short story author, editor, essayist, activist, and novelist. Tierce was born in Texas and attended the Iowa Writers' Workshop, receiving her MFA in fiction in 2011. She previously taught at the University of Iowa. She was a founding board member of the Texas Equal Access Fund and previously worked as Executive Director of the TEA. She lives in Los Angeles and was a writer for Orange Is the New Black.

== Awards and honors ==
- 2019 Whiting Award
- 2015 PEN literary awards finalist
- 2015 Texas Institute of Letters Steven Turner Award for First Fiction
- 2013 National Book Foundation's 5 Under 35 Honoree
- 2011 Rona Jaffe Foundation Writers' Award

=== Residencies ===
- 2017 MacDowell Colony Fellowship
- 2017 Willapa Bay Artist-in-Residence
- Can Cab Residency

== Bibliography ==
=== Novels ===
- Love Me Back. Doubleday Books. 2014. ISBN 978-0-3458-0713-7.

=== Short stories ===
- "Casa Linda." D Magazine. 2017.
- "Calvin D. Colson." PEN America #19: Hauntings. 2016.
- "Solitaire." Oxford American. 2014.
- "Everything I Did in Madrid." H.O.W. Journal. 2014.
- "Suck It." Southwest Review and New Stories from the South: The Year's Best. 2008.

=== Essays ===
- "Good Enough for a Tuesday Night", The New Yorker, 2026.
- "The Abortion I Didn't Have." The New York Times Magazine. 2021.
- "Distributed Denial of Service." Granta. 2019.
- "Author Merritt Tierce's Brief Stint as a Mailman." D Magazine. 2017.
- "What to Read If You Care About Access to Abortion in Trump's America." LitHub. 2017.
- "At Sea." The Paris Review. 2016.
- "I Published My Debut Novel to Critical Acclaim—And Then I Promptly Went Broke." Marie Claire. 2016.
- "Why I'm Still Infuriated About Abortion Access in Texas." Cosmopolitan. 2016.
- "This is What an Abortion Looks Like." The New York Times. 2014.
- "World Cup." Electric Lit. 2014.

=== Other work ===
Tierce was a writer for seasons six and seven of Orange Is the New Black.

== Early life and education ==
Tierce grew up in Texas in a strongly Christian household. In 1997, at 19, she graduated from Abilene Christian University with a bachelor's degree, having started college two years early. She was slated to start a graduate program at Yale School of Divinity the next year, but her plans changed due to a pregnancy and ensuing marriage to the father of her unborn child. Tierce did not consider abortion due to her religious beliefs at the time (she had written and presented against it while unknowingly pregnant). She also could not imagine giving up her child for adoption. She never went to Yale, but earned a Master's of Fine Arts from the Iowa Writers Workshop about 15 years later.

The couple had a second child about a year later. They eventually divorced, and continued co-parenting amicably. Tierce remarried around age 36, and has a stepdaughter.
