= Kathleen Graber =

American poet

- Born: October 21, 1959 (age 66); Wildwood, New Jersey, U.S.
- Education: New York University
- Occupations: Academic; Poet
- Writing career
- Genre: Poetry

Kathleen Graber is an American poet and professor of creative writing and poetry at Virginia Commonwealth University. She has also taught at New York University.

== Early life and education ==
Graber was raised in Wildwood, New Jersey where she still owns a home. She studied under poet Stephen Dunn and went on to earn her BA in philosophy from New York University. She quit teaching middle school English to afford herself the ability to enroll in an MFA program and pursue a career in poetry. Kathleen said of the experience, "Most poets live humble lives, I think, and maybe that is by temperament or design, or maybe it is just a necessity."

== Awards ==
Graber has earned many awards for her work including the Rona Jaffe Foundation Writers' Award (2003), the Amy Lowell Traveling award, a National Endowment for the Arts award and the Guggenheim award. She is a Hodder Fellow of Princeton University, a National Book Award finalist and a National Book Critics Circle finalist.

2020 UNT Rilke Prize.

== Works ==
- Correspondence Ardmore, PA: Saturnalia Books, 2005 ISBN 978-0975499030
- The Eternal City: poems Princeton, NJ: Princeton University Press, 2010 ISBN 978-0691146102
- The River Twice Princeton, NJ: Princeton University Press, 2019 ISBN 978-0691193212
