= Larissa Szporluk =

American poet and professor

- Education: University of Michigan; University of California, Berkeley; University of Virginia
- Occupations: Poet; professor

Larissa Szporluk is an American poet and professor. Her most recent book is Embryos & Idiots (Tupelo Press, 2007). Her poems have appeared in literary journals and magazines including Daedalus, Faultline, Meridian, American Poetry Review, and Black Warrior Review. Her honors include two The Best American Poetry awards, a Pushcart Prize, and fellowships from Guggenheim, the National Endowment for the Arts, and the Ohio Arts Council.

== Background ==
She was raised in Ann Arbor, Michigan and graduated from the University of Michigan. She studied at the Iowa Writers’ Workshop and graduated from University of California, Berkeley, and the University of Virginia with an MFA, where she was a Henry Hoyns fellow. She was a visiting professor at Cornell University, in 2005, and currently teaches at Bowling Green State University. Her work has been included in anthologies such as The Best American Poetry 1999 (Scribner, 1999), Best of Beacon 1999 (Beacon Press, 2000), The new young American poets (Southern Illinois University Press, 2000), Best American Poetry 2001 (Simon and Schuster, 2001) and Twentieth-century American poetry (McGraw Hill, 2004).

== Honors & awards ==
- 2009 Guggenheim Fellow
- 2003-2004 National Endowment for the Arts Fellowship in Poetry
- 2003-2004 Ohio Arts Council Individual Award for Poetry
- 1997 Barnard Women Poets Prize
- 1998 Rona Jaffe Foundation Writers' Award
- Iowa Poetry Prize, for Isolato

== Poetry collections ==
- Traffic with Macbeth. Tupelo Press. 2011. ISBN 978-1-936797-02-8.
- Embryos & Idiots. Tupelo Press. 2007. ISBN 978-1-932195-52-1.
- The Wind, Master Cherry, the Wind. Alice James Books. 2003. ISBN 978-1-882295-39-5.
- Isolato. University of Iowa Press. 2000. ISBN 978-0-87745-704-6.
- Dark Sky Question. Beacon Press. 1998. ISBN 978-0-8070-6866-3.
