= Adrian Blevins =

American poet (born 1964)

- Born: 1964 (age 61–62); Abingdon, Virginia
- Education: Virginia Intermont College (B.A.); Hollins University (M.A.); Warren Wilson College (M.F.A.)
- Occupations: Poet; Professor of English and Director of Creative Writing Program at Colby College

Adrian Blevins (born 1964 in Abingdon, Virginia, United States) is an American poet. She is the author of four collections of poetry, including Appalachians Run Amok, winner of the 2016 Wilder Prize (Two Sylvias Press, 2018). Her other full-length poetry collections are Status Pending (Four Way Books, 2023), Live from the Homesick Jamboree (Wesleyan University Press, 2009) and The Brass Girl Brouhaha (Ausable Press, now Copper Canyon Press, 2003). With Karen McElmurray, Blevins co-edited Walk Till the Dogs Get Mean: Meditations on the Forbidden from Contemporary Appalachia (Ohio University Press, 2015), a collection of essays of new and emerging Appalachian poets, fiction writers, and nonfiction writers. Her chapbooks are Bloodline (Hollyridge Press, 2012) and The Man Who Went Out for Cigarettes, which won the first of Bright Hill Press's chapbook contests. (Bright Hill Press, 1996).

Blevins won a Rona Jaffe Foundation Writers' Award in 2002. Other prizes include the Lamar York Prize for Nonfiction from the Chattahoochee Review, a Pushcart Prize for "Tally" from Appalachians Run Amok, and other magazine prizes from Ploughshares and Zone 3. She was a Walter Daken Poetry Fellow at the Sewanee Writers' Conference in 2008 and a Fellow at the Virginia Center for the Creative Arts in 2017.

== Life ==
Adrian Blevins was born in Abingdon, Virginia to a family of artists, including her grandfather (Banner Blevins who was a painter, sculptor, and cabinetmaker), her father (Tedd Blevins, who was a Virginia Intermont College art professor and painter), her stepfather (Jake Cress, who is a cabinetmaker), and her stepmother (Carole Blevins who is a painter).

Blevins graduated with a BA from Virginia Intermont College, a MA in fiction from Hollins University, and a MFA in Poetry from Warren Wilson College in 2002. She went on to teach at Roanoke College, Hollins University, Sweet Briar College, and at Lynchburg College as the Thornton Wilder Fellow. She currently teaches at Colby College in Waterville, Maine and lives in East Winthrop, Maine.

Her poems have appeared in The American Poetry Review, Poetry, The Baffler, The Georgia Review, The Gettysburg Review, Copper Nickel, Crazyhorse, The Greensboro Review, The Southern Review, The Massachusetts Review, Ploughshares, and elsewhere. They have been reprinted in The Open Door One Hundred Poems, One Hundred Years of "Poetry" Magazine; Seriously Funny: Poems about Love, Death, Religion, Art, Politics, Sex, and Everything Else; From the Fishouse: An Anthology of Poems that Sing, Rhyme, Resound, Syncopate, Alliterate, and Just Plain Sound Great.

== Awards ==
- 2024 Maine Literary Awards (Book Award for Poetry) for Status Pending
- 2018 Wilder Prize, Two Sylvias Press
- 2013 Pushcart Prize, Pushcart Prize XXXVII: Best of the Small Presses.
- 2012 Zone 3 Poetry Award.
- 2010 Ploughshares Cohen Award for "The Waning."
- 2007 Walter E. Daken Fellowship, Sewanee Writers' Conference
- 2004 Kate Tufts Discovery Award for The Brass Girl Brouhaha
- 2002 Rona Jaffe Foundation Writers' Award
- 2000 Lamar York Prize for Nonfiction from The Chattahoochee Review
- 1996 Bright Hill Press Chapbook Award for The Man Who Went Out for Cigarettes, which was reprinted in 1997

== Bibliography ==
=== Poetry ===
Collections

- The Brass Girl Brouhaha (Ausable Press, 2003), ISBN 978-1-931337-10-6
- Live from the Homesick Jamboree (Wesleyan University Press, 2009)
- Appalachians Run Amok (Two Sylvias Press, 2018)
- Status Pending (Four Way, 2023)

Chapbooks

- The Man Who Went Out for Cigarettes (Bright Hill Press, 1997), ISBN 978-0-9646844-2-3
- Bloodline (Hollyridge Press, 2012)

List of poems

Title	Year	First published	Reprinted/collected
Tally	2011	Blevins, Adrian (Fall 2011). "Tally". The Georgia Review.	Blevins, Adrian (2013). "Tally". In Henderson, Bill (ed.). The Pushcart Prize XXXVII : best of the small presses 2013. Pushcart Press. p. 577.
Dear New Mothers of America	2009	Blevins, Adrian (March 2009). "Dear New Mothers of America". American Poetry Review.	

- "Status Report", poets.org
- "Memo", poets.org
- "Dear Mothers of America", poets.org
- "The Way She Figured He Figured It", poets.org
- "Hey You", poets.org
- "How to Cook a Wolf", Poetry, October 2008
- "Novelette", Poetry, October 2005
- "For My Students"; "Life History", The Drunken Boat
- "Love Poem for the Proles" on Poems from Here with Stuart Kestenbaum
- Audio: From the Fishouse > Adrian Blevins Reading Why the Marriage Failed
- Poem: The Poetry Foundation > from Poetry, October 2005 > Novelette by Adrian Blevins

=== Nonfiction ===
- Walk Till the Dogs Get Mean (Ohio University Press, 2015)
- "How Narrative Saved Me"
- "Nouns in Their Habitats"
- "Educating by Poetry"
- "Of Madmen and Spies"
- "Of Madmen and Spies", cont.
- "Of Madmen and Spies", cont.
- "In Praise of the Sentence", Poetry Foundation

=== Critical studies and reviews of Blevins' work ===
- "Let Fly the Splendor", by Abigail Deutsch, Poetry Magazine
