= Trudy Dittmar =

American nature writer and essayist

- Born: 1944 (age 81–82)
- Occupations: Writer, essayist
- Writing career
- Genre: Nature writing
- Notable awards: Rona Jaffe Foundation Writers' Award (2000); Whiting Award (2003)

Trudy Dittmar (born 1944) is an American nature writer and essayist.

== Life ==
She is the daughter of George Julius and Florence G. Dittmar. Her work appeared in North Dakota Quarterly, High Plains Literary Review, and North American Review.

She lives in Dubois, Wyoming.

== Awards ==
- 2003 Whiting Award
- 2000 Rona Jaffe Foundation Writers' Award

== Works ==
- "Moose", The North American Review, September/ October 1996
- Fauna and Flora, Earth and Sky: Brushes with Nature's Wisdom. University of Iowa Press. 2003. ISBN 978-0-87745-872-2.

=== Anthologies ===
- Bill Henderson, ed. (1996). The 1997 Pushcart prize XXI: best of the small presses. Pushcart Press. ISBN 978-0-916366-96-4.
- Ian Frazier; Robert Atwan, eds. (1997). The Best American essays. Houghton Mifflin. ISBN 978-0-395-85695-6.
- John A. Murray, ed. (February 15, 2000). American Nature Writing 2000. Oregon State University Press. ISBN 978-0-87071-551-8.
- The Norton Book of Nature Writing, John Elder, Robert Finch (Eds.), ISBN 978-0-393-94634-5
