= Ashlee Adams Crews =

American fiction writer

- Born: September 22, 1976 (age 49); Sandersville, Georgia, U.S.
- Education: University of Georgia (BA); Georgia College & State University (MFA)

Ashlee Adams Crews (born September 22, 1976) is an American fiction writer.

== Biography ==
Crews was born and raised just outside Sandersville, Georgia. She earned an English degree from the University of Georgia and later earned an MFA in Creative Writing from Georgia College and State University. She currently lives in Durham, North Carolina, with her husband and two daughters and has taught composition at the University of North Carolina at Chapel Hill.

Crews has published several short stories. Her story “Bird Feed” appears in McSweeney’s issue #27 and won a Pushcart Prize in 2010. “Called Out” appears in the Autumn 2010 edition of The Southern Review. Her story “Bull of the Woods” appears in Prairie Schooner. Her story “Restoration” was published in Shenandoah in February 2012.

Her story "Church Time" won the 2011 James Hurst Prize for Fiction, sponsored by North Carolina State University and judged by Ron Rash. "Church Time" was published by Southwest Review in Volume 98, Number 1. Her story "Church Time" also won the 2013 McGinnis-Richie Award for fiction. The award is given by the Southwest Review.

Crews' short story collection "Called Out" was named a finalist for the 2012 Flannery O'Connor Award for Short Fiction.

Crews was named a 2013 winner of the Rona Jaffe Foundation Writers' Award.

Crews' short story "Day One" was published in the Summer 2018 issue of Ploughshares, which was guest-edited by Jill McCorkle.
