= Leslie Ryan =

American writer

Leslie Ryan is an American non-fiction writer from Richmond, Virginia, and winner of the 2000 Rona Jaffe Foundation Writers' Award.
