= Marisa de los Santos =

Author, and poet

- Born: August 12, 1966 (age 60); Baltimore, Maryland, USA
- Education: University of Virginia (B.A.); Sarah Lawrence College (M.F.A.); University of Houston (Ph.D.)

Marisa de los Santos (born August 12, 1966), is a New York Times Best Seller list author, and poet.

== Biography ==
Marisa de los Santos was born in 1966. She graduated with a Bachelor of Arts degree in English from the University of Virginia before completing a Master of Fine Arts in Sarah Lawrence College and going on to gain a PhD from the University of Houston. She married David Teague with whom she has two children. They have also worked on a number of books together. She lives in Wilmington, Delaware and taught in the University of Delaware. De los Santos has been given a grant for her writing by the Delaware Arts Council as well as winning the Rona Jaffe Foundation Writers' Award.

De los Santos writes both novels and poetry. Her poems have been published by Prairie Schooner, The Antioch Review, Poetry, Western Humanities Review as well as the Chelsea, and Virginia Quarterly Review.

== Bibliography ==
- From the Bones Out: Poems, 2000
- Love Walked In: A Novel, 2006
- Belong to Me, 2008
- Falling together, 2011
- Saving Lucas Biggs, with David Teague, 2014
- Connect the Stars, with David Teague, 2015
- The Precious One, 2015
- I'll Be Your Blue Sky, 2018
- I'd Give Anything, 2020
- Watch Us Shine, 2023
