= L.B. Thompson =

American poet

LB Thompson is an American poet, who lives on Eastern Long Island, New York.

== Life and work ==
She studied at Sarah Lawrence College and received an MFA in creative writing from New York University. Her poems have been published in The New Yorker and Prairie Schooner, and her chapbook, Tendered Notes: Poems of Love and Money won the Center for Book Arts prize and was published in a limited edition in 2003. Her awards include a 2002 Rona Jaffe Foundation Writers' Award and a 2010 Whiting Award.
