= Maggie Smith (poet) =

American poet (born 1977)

- Smith at the 2026 Texas Book Festival
- Born: 1977 (age 48–49); Columbus, Ohio, U.S.
- Education: Ohio Wesleyan University (BA); Ohio State University (MFA)
- Occupations: Poet, freelance writer, editor
- Children: 2
- Writing career
- Notable works: "Good Bones" (2016); You Could Make This Place Beautiful (2023)
- Notable awards: NEA Fellowship (2011)

Maggie Smith (born 1977) is an American poet, freelance writer, and editor who lives in Bexley, Ohio. She worked as an associate editor for a publisher before switching to freelance work. Her 2016 poem "Good Bones" went viral and her 2023 memoir was a New York Times best-seller. Smith has received several honors and awards, including a National Endowment for the Arts Fellowship and two Ohio Arts Council Individual Excellence Awards.

== Early life and education ==
Smith was born in Columbus, Ohio, in 1977. She received her Bachelor of Arts from Ohio Wesleyan University in 1999, and then went on to receive her Master of Fine Arts in poetry from Ohio State University in 2003.

== Career ==
From 2003 to 2004, Smith served as the Emerging Writer Lecturer for Gettysburg College. She went on to take a position as an assistant editor with a children's trade book publisher. She worked there for two years, and became an associate editor. Eventually, she decided to make the switch to freelance work.

=== Poetry ===
Smith's poem "Good Bones", originally published in the journal Waxwing in June 2016, has been widely circulated on social media and read by an estimated one million people. A Wall Street Journal story in May 2020 described it as "keeping the realities of life's ugliness from young innocents" and noted that the poem has gone viral after catastrophes such as the 2016 Orlando nightclub shooting, the May 2017 suicide bombing at a concert in Manchester, England, the 2017 mass shooting in Las Vegas, and the coronavirus pandemic. PRI called it "the official poem of 2016".

Her poems have been published widely, appearing in journals including The Paris Review, The Gettysburg Review, The Iowa Review, The Southern Review, Virginia Quarterly Review, Shenandoah, and iamb and being anthologized in From the Other World: Poems in Memory of James Wright; The Year’s Best Fantasy & Horror 2008; Apocalypse Now: Poems and Prose from the End of Days, and The Helen Burns Anthology: New Voices from the Academy of American Poets University & College Prizes, Volume 9.

Smith has published three chapbooks and five full-length volumes of poetry, including The Well Speaks of Its Own Poison, winner of the 2012 Dorset Prize and the 2016 Independent Publisher Book Awards Gold Medal in Poetry, and Lamp of the Body, winner of the Benjamin Saltman Award.

Her fifth collection, A Suit or a Suitcase, was published in March 2026 by Washington Square Press. Writing for The Michigan Daily, Amany Sayed called the book "a beautifully haunting collection of poems that explore the self, the body and the soul... Her vivid wording and lush descriptions allow us to consider all these parts of life without cruelty."

=== Nonfiction and other projects ===
Her debut essay collection, Keep Moving: Notes on Loss, Creativity and Change, was released in 2020. Kirkus Reviews described the essays as "Simple yet profound insights and advice to return to in times of confusion or loss."

Her memoir, You Could Make This Place Beautiful, was published by Simon & Schuster in 2023. The book debuted at No. 3 on The New York Times Hardcover Nonfiction List. It was listed it as one of the "100 Must Read Books of 2023" by TIME Magazine.

In April 2025, Smith published Dear Writer: Pep Talks & Practical Advice for the Creative Life, a book of writing advice and encouragement that draws from her twenty years of teaching experience. In an interview with The New York Times, she said "The tools I share in each of these sections of the book are portable; readers can carry them across genres or forms of art." In a starred review, Library Journal called the book "a glimpse of the gut-wrenching, visceral ways great writers feel the world around them. A lovely invitation into Smith's processes that is luminous and shimmering, designed to make writing feel accessible yet magical!"

In September 2025, Smith and Saeed Jones released the anthology The People's Project: Poems, Essays, and Art for Looking Forward, featuring original and selected work from twenty-seven writers. "After the election of 2024, poets Jones and Smith looked to their 'mentors, siblings on the page, and friends' for hope and solace, strategies and commiseration. Their collection of 27 essays, poems, and artwork honors that diverse community of writers and artists who share their reflections on how to cope with oppression and how to move forward."

== Personal life ==
Smith met her former husband, an attorney, at university. They have two children. Their divorce is the focus of her memoir.

== Honors and awards ==
- 2011 National Endowment for the Arts Fellowship in poetry
- 2012 Dorset Prize
- Wick Poetry Series Chapbook Competition
- Sustainable Arts Foundation, Fall 2014
- Benjamin Saltman Award
- Ohio Arts Council Individual Excellence Award 2007, 2010
- 2013 Dream Horse Press Chapbook Prize
- 2016 Independent Publisher Book Award, Gold Medal in Poetry

== Published works ==
=== Full-length poetry collections ===
- Lamp of the Body (Red Hen Press, 2005)
- The Well Speaks of Its Own Poison (Tupelo Press, 2015)
- Good Bones (Tupelo Press, 2017)
- Goldenrod (One Signal Publishers, 2021)
- A Suit or a Suitcase: Poems (Washington Square Press, 2026)

=== Chapbooks ===
- Nesting Dolls (Pudding House, 2005)
- The List of Dangers (Kent State University Press, 2010)
- Disasterology (Dream Horse Press, 2016)

=== Essay collections ===
- Keep Moving: Notes on Loss, Creativity and Change (One Signal Publishers, 2020)

=== Memoirs ===
- You Could Make This Place Beautiful (Simon & Schuster, 2023)

=== Other Nonfiction ===
- Dear Writer: Pep Talks & Practical Advice for the Creative Life. Washington Square Press. 2025. ISBN 9781982170844.

=== Anthology ===
- Saeed Jones; Maggie Smith (2025). The People's Project. Washington Square Press. ISBN 9781668207024.
