= Joan Houlihan =

American poet

Joan Houlihan is an American poet. She is the author of six books, most recently It Isn't a Ghost if it Lives in Your Chest (Four Way Books), winner of the 2021 Julia Ward Howe Award. Her other books are Shadow-feast (Four Way Books, 2018), described by the Los Angeles Review as "...a tour de force sheared of excess, breathtaking in its leaps, and thrilling in its sonic resonances"; The Us (Tupelo Press, 2009) described by Lucie Brock-Broido as: "...like nothing I have ever read or seen...wildly hewn, classically construed and skewed by an imagined lexicon....both syntactically inventive and radically simple"; Ay (Tupelo Press, 2014), the sequel to The Us, described by Ilya Kaminsky as "breathtakingly inventive and yet deeply humane...a narrative and song at once; it is talismanic"; The Mending Worm (New Issues Press), winner of the 2005 Green Rose Prize in Poetry, and Hand-Held Executions: Poems & Essays (Del Sol Press, 2003; Room 204 Press, 2009) which includes her series of essays on contemporary American poetry called The Boston Comment. The essays drew a great deal of attention for their criticism of both traditional and what she termed "post-avant" poetry, occasioning responses from Fred Moramarco of Poetry International and a wide range of letters from the poetry community both favorable and critical.

== Biography ==
Houlihan was born and raised in Newton, Massachusetts and received her BA and MA from University of Massachusetts Amherst. She has taught at Columbia University, Smith College, and Emerson College and she is Professor of Practice in Poetry at Clark University in Worcester, Massachusetts. She is also on the faculty of Lesley University's low-residency M.F.A. in Creative Writing program.

Her work has appeared widely in many journals and magazines, among them Boston Review, Columbia: A Journal of Literature and Arts, Fulcrum, Gettysburg Review, Gulf Coast, Harvard Review, Indiana Review, Pleiades, Poetry International, Poetry, VOLT, and has been anthologized in The Iowa Anthology of New American Poetries (University of Iowa Press), The Book of Irish-American Poetry–Eighteenth Century to Present (University of Notre Dame Press), and The World Is Charged: Poetic Engagements with Gerard Manley Hopkins (Clemson University Press).

She is founder of the Concord Poetry Center in Concord, Massachusetts and of the Colrain Poetry Manuscript Conference.

== Published works ==
Full-Length Poetry Collections

- It Isn't a Ghost if it Lives in Your Chest (Four Way Books, September, 2021)
- Shadow-feast (Four Way Books, March, 2018)
- Ay (Tupelo Press, February, 2014)
- The Us (Tupelo Press, September, 2009)
- The Mending Worm (New Issues Press, 2006)

Multi-Genre Collections

- Hand-Held Executions: Poems & Essays (ISBN 978-0615284217)

=== Anthologies ===
- The Eloquent Poem: 128 Contemporary Poems and Their Making (Persea Books, 2019)
- The World Is Charged: Poetic Engagements with Gerard Manley Hopkins (Clemson University Press, 2017)
- The Iowa Anthology of New American Poetries (University of Iowa Press, 2005)
- An Anthology of Irish-American Poetry, 18th Century to Present (University of Notre Dame, 2006)

== Concord Poetry Center ==
Houlihan founded the Concord Poetry Center in March 2004. Located at the Emerson Umbrella Center for the Arts in Concord, Massachusetts, the Concord Poetry Center was established as an independent (non-university affiliated) organization in MetroWest and the Greater Boston area with an emphasis on activities and services for poets and lovers of poetry.
