= Sharifa Rhodes-Pitts =

American writer and historian

Sharifa Rhodes-Pitts is an American writer and historian.

== Life ==
Rhodes-Pitts is from Houston, Texas, graduated from Harvard and was a Fulbright Scholar in the United Kingdom.

Her work has appeared in The New York Times, Harper's, Vogue, and Essence among other publications.

She won a Rona Jaffe Foundation Writers' Award for non-fiction in 2006, and has received awards from the Lannan Foundation, and the New York Foundation for the Arts. She won a 2012 Whiting Award.

== Harlem Is Nowhere ==
Her 2011 book, Harlem Is Nowhere, is the first part of a planned trilogy on African Americans and utopia. The following books in the trilogy will concern Haiti and the Southern United States. Harlem Is Nowhere was named among 100 Notable Books of 2011 by The New York Times Book Review and nominated for a National Book Critics Circle Award. Harlem Is Nowhere developed from Lenox Terminal, a 2004 essay Rhodes-Pitts wrote for Transition magazine. It was shortlisted for the 2012 Dolman Best Travel Book Award.

== Bibliography ==
- 2011 – Harlem Is Nowhere (Little, Brown & Co/Granta Books)
