= Malena Mörling =

Swedish-American poet and translator

Malena Mörling (born 1965), is a Swedish-American poet and translator. She is the author of two books of poetry, Ocean Avenue, which won the New Issues Press Poetry Prize in 1998 and Astoria, published by Pittsburgh Press in 2006. In 1999, she received the Rona Jaffe Foundation Writers' Award.

== Early life and education ==
Mörling was born in Stockholm, Sweden 1965. She was raised in southern Sweden.

== Career ==
She has translated works by the Swedish poet Tomas Tranströmer, the Finland-Swedish poet Edith Södergran and numerous other Swedish poets as well as the American poet Philip Levine into Swedish. She was awarded a John Simon Guggenheim Foundation Fellowship in 2007 and a Lannan Foundation Literary Fellowship in 2010. She is a research associate at the School For Advanced Research on the Human Experience in Santa Fe, New Mexico.

She is currently Professor in the Department of Creative Writing at The University of North Carolina at Wilmington and Core Faculty in The Low Residency MFA program at New England College.

== Reception ==
Mörling has received exceptional praise for both "Ocean Avenue" and "Astoria" by editors and poets. Ed Ochester, for The Best American Poetry wrote: "MALENA MÖRLING's poems are low-key, minimalist, utterly unpretentious and yet--how does she do it?--they speak about the central conditions of our lives as few poems do."
