= Helen Phillips (novelist) =

American novelist

- Born: 1981 (age 44–45); Colorado, U.S.
- Education: Yale University (BA); Brooklyn College (MFA)
- Occupation: Writer
- Spouse: Adam Douglas Thompson (m. 2007)
- Writing career
- Years active: 2009–present
- Genre: Fiction
- Notable awards: Rona Jaffe Foundation Writers' Award (2009)
- Website: helencphillips.com

Helen Phillips (born 1981) is an American novelist.

== Biography ==
Phillips was born in Colorado. When she was a child she was affected by alopecia and by the age of 11 she had lost all of her hair.

She graduated from Yale University in 2004, and received her Master of Fine Arts (MFA) from Brooklyn College (CUNY) in 2007. She moved to Brooklyn with her husband, the artist Adam Douglas Thompson, when she began Brooklyn's MFA and is now an associate professor of creative writing in the English Department of Brooklyn College.

Her debut was the story collection And Yet They Were Happy, which was published in 2011. In 2012 it was listed as a "highly recommend" notable collection by The Story Prize. In 2013 she published a children's adventure novel, Here Where the Sunbeams Are Green. She followed it with her first adult novel, The Beautiful Bureaucrat, in 2015.

== Awards and recognition ==
- The 2008 Calvino Prize for "The Regimes", an excerpt from And Yet They Were Happy
- Finalist in the Leapfrog Press Spring 2009 Fiction Contest
- Rona Jaffe Foundation Writer’s Award, 2009
- Iowa Review Nonfiction Award
- DIAGRAM Innovative Fiction Award, (date needed)
- Longlist: National Book Award for The Need, 2019

== Selected works ==
=== Novels ===
- The Beautiful Bureaucrat (2015), which was named a New York Times notable book in 2015.
- The Need (2019), which was longlisted for the National Book Award in 2019.
- Hum (2024)

=== Short story collections ===
- And Yet They Were Happy (2011), a finalist in the Leapfrog Press Spring 2009 Fiction Contest, which was subsequently published by Leapfrog Press.
- Some Possible Solutions (2016), which received the 2017 John Gardner Fiction Book Award.

=== Children's books ===
- Here Where the Sunbeams Are Green (2012), which was published internationally as Upside Down in the Jungle.
