= Aamina Ahmad =

British fiction writer

- Born: London, U.K.
- Education: University College London; Iowa Writers' Workshop; Stanford University
- Occupations: Writer, novelist
- Writing career
- Notable works: The Dishonoured (2016); The Return of Faraz Ali (2022)

Aamina Ahmad is a British fiction writer and playwright based in the U.S. She has two book publications, the play The Dishonoured and the novel The Return of Faraz Ali, which was named a "new work to read" by The New York Times, "quietly stunning" by The New York Times Book Review, and a "most anticipated" book by both The Millions and Book Culture. She is a creative writing professor at the University of Minnesota and the winner of a Rona Jaffe Foundation Writer's Award.

== Early life and education ==
Ahmad was born and raised in London, England. In 1996, she graduated from University College London, where she studied English. She later moved to the United States to attend the Iowa Writers' Workshop, where she studied fiction and graduated in 2013. After two further years of teaching at the University of Iowa, she served as a Stegner Fellow at Stanford University for two years, finishing the program in 2017.

== Career ==
Ahmad worked for many years as a script editor for BBC Drama, ITV, and BBC World Service. As a playwright, she participated in development programs including with the UK Film Council and the Royal Court Theatre and her first full-length play The Dishonoured won a Screencraft Stage Play Award and was nominated for a 2019 Offie. The 2016 play is a thriller about murder, espionage, and politics, which The Guardian rated three out of five stars in a review that criticized the director and the staging's transitions.

Ahmad's debut novel, The Return of Faraz Ali, was published by Riverhead Books, an imprint of Penguin Books, in 2022. In the novel, the titular character Faraz Ali returns to his hometown in Pakistan to help cover up a girl's death. The book was praised by Yaa Gyasi, Adam Johnson, and Anthony Marra. It received various positive review from magazines and journals including a starred review from Kirkus Reviews, The New York Times Book Review, Bitch magazine, and a starred review from Library Journal. Publishers Weekly was critical of the "jarring" transitions as perspectives and time periods changed.

In 2022, Ahmad became a professor in the University of Minnesota's creative writing department. She previously served as a lecturer in composition and creative writing for San Jose State University from 2017 to 2022, as well as a visiting professor of creative writing at Mills College in Oakland, CA from 2020 to 2021. Her short stories have been published in The Southern Review, The Normal School, The Missouri Review, Ecotone, and And the World Changed. She won a Pushcart Prize for her story "The Red One Who Rocks", which was originally published in 2019 in One Story. In an essay in Literary Hub, Ahmad discussed literary relationships and the influence of her mother on her fiction.
