= Asako Serizawa =

Japanese writer

Asako Serizawa is a Japanese writer who is the recipient of PEN/Open Book Award in 2021, The Story Prize Spotlight Award, Massachusetts Book Award, Pushcart Prize, Rona Jaffe Foundation Writers' Award and two times recipient of O. Henry Award. She is the fellow of Civitella Ranieri Foundation and National Endowment for the Arts.

== Bibliography ==
Serizawa, Asako (2020). Inheritors. Doubleday Books. ISBN 9780385545389. OCLC 429528985.
