= Nana Nkweti =

American fiction writer

- Education: Rutgers University, University of Iowa
- Occupation: Writer
- Writing career
- Genre: Fiction
- Notable work: Walking on Cowry Shells
- Notable awards: Whiting Award
- Website: nanankweti.com

Nana Nkweti is an American Cameroonian writer and the author of the short story collection Walking on Cowry Shells, which won a Whiting Award.

== Education ==
Nkweti completed a BA (Political Science) at Rutgers University and is assistant professor of creative writing at the University of Alabama. She attended the Iowa Writers' Workshop.

== Career ==
Her collection of stories, Walking on Cowry Shells, was published by Graywolf in 2021. The New York Times Book Review hailed it as a "raucous and thoroughly impressive debut" with "utterly original stories" that "range from laugh-out-loud funny to heartbreaking, and are often both."

NPR called Nkweti "a linguistic pole vaulter" who "bends language like a master." The Los Angeles Review of Books praised how "Nkweti uses genre tropes to subvert our expectations. She employs the zombie story, the fairy tale, and the confessional in order to invert conventions."

In a profile of Nkweti, Open Country Mag wrote that "the stories also speak to the universal idea of people charting next steps, growing and evolving along the way", going on to note:

The title “Walking on Cowrie Shells” is a play on the English idiom. She deploys it in the book to embody that sense of being in a threshold, in liminal spaces, of teetering between choices, between cultures or identities. Her characters are tentative; they are about becoming and figuring life out, who they are, who they want to be.

The New Yorker wrote that the stories are "Lively and fast-paced, funny and tragic" and that they "refuse a singular African experience in favor of a vivid plurality."

Nkweti made her television debut as a writer on the episode "Gone" of the series The Walking Dead: The Ones Who Live.

== Publications ==
- Walking on Cowry Shells (Graywolf, 2021)
