= Ellen Hinsey =

American poet (born 1960)

- Born: Boston, Massachusetts
- Education: Tufts University, Université de Paris VII
- Occupations: Writer, researcher, professor
- Writing career
- Notable awards: Berlin Prize Fellowship, Lannan Foundation Award, DAAD Berliner Künstlerprogramm Fellow, Rona Jaffe Foundation Writers' Award

Ellen Hinsey (born in Boston) is an author, poet, researcher and professor. Her work is concerned with history, ethics and democracy with a focus on Central and Eastern Europe. She has taught at the French graduate school, the École Polytechnique, and in Skidmore College's Paris program.

== Early life and education ==
Ellen Hinsey was born in Boston, Massachusetts. She received a Bachelor of Fine Arts degree from Tufts University and a graduate degree from Université de Paris VII. For the last three decades she has lived in Europe.

== Career ==
Hinsey's current work addresses authoritarianism. She has received a number of awards including fellowships from the American Academy in Berlin (2001) and the DAAD Berlin Künstlerprogramm Fellowship (2015), a Lannan Foundation Award, a Union League Civic/Arts Award, a Stover Prize and a Rona Jaffe Foundation Award.

She is a senior editor at the New American Studies Journal and is the international correspondent for The New England Review.

She has been an invited speaker at the University of Bonn, the American Academy in Berlin, the Polish Academy of Sciences, LMU Munich, the Free University of Berlin, and the École Normale Supérieure, among others. She has been an invited author at international festivals and other venues including The New School (New York), Poetry International (Royal Festival Hall), the London Book Fair, the Leipzig Book Fair, the International Literaturfestival Berlin, Cuirt International Festival of Literature, the Dublin Festival of Literature, the Sorbonne, the University of Łódź and The Arsenal Book Festival (Kiev) among others.

== Writing ==
Hinsey is the author of six books and has edited and translated three others.

Hinsey's collection of essays, Mastering the Past: Contemporary Central and Eastern Europe and the Rise of Illiberalism (Telos Press, 2017), examines new forms of authoritarianism. It includes first-hand accounts and analyses of the impact of the 2012 Russian presidential election and its aftermath, the rise of populism in Poland and the constitutional crisis, Hungarian illiberalism, Václav Havel's ethical legacy and post-1989 German reconstruction. A selection of these essays first appeared in The New England Review.

In 2018, Hinsey published The Illegal Age, a poetry collection (Arc Publications, 2018). Hinsey has said that the book was written in parallel with Mastering the Past. It is a philosophical-poetic investigation into the twentieth-century's legacy of totalitarianism and the rise of political illegality. Reviewer Chris Edgoose wrote "The word 'important' is over-used (...) but in the case of Ellen Hinsey's The Illegal Age it seems to me the only appropriate adjective (...). It is not a book we can afford to ignore. Like Robert O. Paxton’s 2005 The Anatomy of Fascism, this is a book which approaches its subject with the absolute clarity it requires." The book was the UK Poetry Book Society's 2018 Autumn Choice.

Her memoir collaboration with Lithuanian dissident and poet Tomas Venclova, Magnetic North: Conversations with Tomas Venclova, examines postwar Eastern European totalitarianism, dissidence, culture and ethics. It has been published in German, English, Lithuanian, Ukrainian, Polish and Russian editions, and was nominated for Lithuania's 2018 Book of the Year.

Beginning in February 2002, she traveled to the International Criminal Tribunal for the former Yugoslavia in The Hague to listen to witness sessions. Her third collection of poems, Update on the Descent, addressed this experience, and is an anatomy of political violence. It was published in 2009 by Notre Dame University Press and Bloodaxe Books, and has been called "an urgent, probing book." The German translation, by Uta Gosmann as Des Menschen Element (2017), was described in Der Tagesspiegel as "eine poetische Anthropologie der Gewalt" (a poetic anthropology of violence).

Her second collection of poems, The White Fire of Time (Wesleyan University Press, 2002 / Bloodaxe Books, 2003) was written after a family tragedy, and explores ethics and renewal.

Hinsey's first collection of poems, Cities of Memory, draws on her experiences at the Berlin Wall on the weekend of November 9, 1989, as well as in Prague during the Velvet Revolution. The book was selected for the Yale Series of Younger Poets by James Dickey and was published by Yale University Press in 1996.

=== Translations ===
Hinsey is the editor and co-translator of The Junction: Selected Poems of Tomas Venclova (Bloodaxe Books, 2008). Her other translations include The Secret Piano, by Zhu Xiao-Mei, an account of growing up under the Cultural Revolution (Amazon Crossing, 2012) and Wild Harmonies by Hélène Grimaud (Riverhead/Penguin Books, 2005).

== Honors and awards ==
- 2018 UK Poetry Book Society, Autumn Choice, The Illegal Age
- 2017 SWR Bestenliste July/August
- 2015 DAAD Berliner Künstlerprogramm Fellow
- 2014 National Poetry Series (finalist)
- 2013 Pushcart Prize nomination for "The New Opposition in Hungary"
- 2012 Pushcart Prize nomination for "Death in the Forest"
- 2007 The Stover Memorial Award / The Southwest Review
- 2001 Berlin Prize Fellowship / The American Academy in Berlin
- 2001 The Union League Civic and Arts Poetry Prize / Poetry
- 1998 Ledig-Rowohlt Foundation Fellowship, Château de Lavigny
- 1998 Rona Jaffe Foundation Writers' Award
- 1996 The Yale Younger Poets Prize
- Lannan Foundation Award

== Bibliography ==
=== Books ===
- Anatomy of the Eclipse (Arrowsmith Press, 2026) ISBN 979-8991525428
- The Invisible Fugue (Wildhouse Publishing, 2023) ISBN 978-1-961741-08-9
- The Illegal Age (Arc Publications, 2018) ISBN 9781911469377, OCLC 1043888514
- Mastering the Past: Contemporary Central and Eastern Europe and the Rise of Illiberalism (Telos Press, 2017) ISBN 9780914386650, OCLC 967919554
- Magnetic North: Conversations with Tomas Venclova (Rochester University Press, 2017 / Boydell & Brewer, 2017) ISBN 9781580469265, OCLC 1007068694

Foreign language editions
- Der magnetische Norden (German edition: Suhrkamp, 2017)
- Nelyginant šiaurė magnetą (Lithuanian edition: Apostrofa, 2017)
- магнітну північ (Ukrainian edition: Dukh i Litera, 2017)
- Magnetyczna Północ. Rozmawia Ellen Hinsey (Polish edition: Zeszyty Literackie, 2017)
- Nord Magnétique: Conversations avec Ellen Hinsey (French edition: Les Éditions Noir sur Blanc, 2023)

- Update on the Descent (University of Notre Dame Press, 2009 / Bloodaxe Books, 2009) ISBN 9780268031084, OCLC 729999929

Foreign language editions
- Des Menschen Element (German edition: Matthes & Seitz, 2017)

- The White Fire of Time (Wesleyan University Press, 2002 / Bloodaxe Books, 2003) ISBN 9781852246129, OCLC 59332608
- Cities of Memory (Yale University Press, 1996) ISBN 9780300066739, OCLC 832673045
- The Junction: Selected Poems of Tomas Venclova, editor and co-translator, (Bloodaxe Books, 2009) ISBN 9781852248109, OCLC 957734093
- The Secret Piano: From Mao's Labor Camps to Bach's Goldberg Variations, by Zhu Xiao-Mei, translation by Ellen Hinsey (AmazonCrossing, 2012)
- Wild Harmonies, by Hélène Grimaud, translation by Ellen Hinsey (Riverhead Press, 2006) ISBN 9781594482663, OCLC 149010528

== Critical studies of Hinsey ==
- 2011: Poetic Memory: The Forgotten Self in Plath, Howe, Hinsey, and Glück by Uta Gosmann, ISBN 978-1611470369
- 2012: (Un)concealing the Hedgehog by Paulina Ambrozy, ISBN 978-8323224839
- 2008: Another Language: Poetic Experiments in Britain and North America by Kornelia Freitag (ed.), ISBN 978-3825812102
