= The Walking Dead: The Ones Who Live =

American post-apocalyptic drama television miniseries

- Genre: Horror; Drama; Zombie apocalypse
- Created by: Scott M. Gimple; Danai Gurira; Andrew Lincoln
- Based on: The Walking Dead by: Robert Kirkman; Tony Moore; Charlie Adlard
- Showrunner: Scott M. Gimple
- Starring: Andrew Lincoln; Danai Gurira; Pollyanna McIntosh
- Composer: Sam Ewing
- Country of origin: United States
- Original language: English
- No. of episodes: 6

Production
- Executive producers: Robert Kirkman; David Alpert; Gale Anne Hurd; Denise Huth; Brian Bockrath; Greg Nicotero; Danai Gurira; Andrew Lincoln; Scott M. Gimple
- Production location: New Jersey
- Cinematography: Adrian Peng Correia
- Camera setup: Single-camera
- Running time: 52–60 minutes
- Production companies: Skybound Entertainment; Valhalla Entertainment; Circle of Confusion; Hush Hush Films; Gurazoo Productions; Idiot Box Productions; AMC Studios
- Budget: 82.75 million (13.7 million per episode)

Original release
- Network: AMC
- Release: February 25 – March 31, 2024

Related
- The Walking Dead

The Walking Dead: The Ones Who Live is an American post-apocalyptic horror drama television miniseries created by Scott M. Gimple, Danai Gurira, and Andrew Lincoln for AMC. It is set after the conclusion of the original The Walking Dead series, with Lincoln, Gurira, and Pollyanna McIntosh reprising their roles as Rick Grimes, Michonne Grimes, and Anne, respectively. It is the sixth spin-off and overall seventh television series in The Walking Dead franchise.

The Ones Who Live premiered on February 25, 2024, on AMC and AMC+, and concluded on March 31, consisting of six episodes. It received generally positive reviews.

== Premise ==
The Walking Dead: The Ones Who Live is set several years after Rick Grimes's supposed death and secret rescue by Anne in The Walking Dead season 9. Rick is taken to the Civic Republic of Philadelphia, a massive and prospering city-state in Pennsylvania that is defended by the Civic Republic Military (CRM), which disallows citizens from leaving and secures the Civic Republic's secret existence with harsh brutality. After losing his left hand in multiple failed escape attempts, Rick joins the CRM. Meanwhile, Michonne Grimes, Rick's wife who set off on a journey to search for him in season 10, finally reunites with Rick. Together, they become entangled in a conspiracy that threatens to destroy both the Civic Republic and themselves.

== Cast and characters ==
=== Main ===
- Andrew Lincoln as Rick Grimes: A former sheriff's deputy from King County, Georgia, the former leader of the Alexandria Safe-Zone, and Michonne's husband who was presumed to be dead. He later becomes a sergeant major in the CRM.
- Danai Gurira as Michonne Grimes: A katana-wielding warrior, former leader of the Alexandria Safe-Zone, and Rick's wife who left her group to search for him.
- Pollyanna McIntosh as Jadis Stokes / Anne: A warrant officer in the CRM who disappeared along with Rick Grimes on a CRM helicopter. McIntosh also appeared in the spin-off series The Walking Dead: World Beyond's second season in a main role.

=== Recurring ===
- Terry O'Quinn as Major General Johnathan Beale: The commander of the Civic Republic Military. Before the apocalypse, he was the Adjutant General of the Pennsylvania National Guard.
- Lesley-Ann Brandt as Pearl Thorne: Rick's friend and a command sergeant major in the CRM. Before the apocalypse, she was a submariner in the South African Navy.

=== Guest ===
- Craig Tate as Lieutenant Colonel Donald Okafor: A senior officer in the Civic Republic Military and former United States Air Force major who trains Rick and Thorne.
- Frankie Quiñones as Esteban Garcia: Rick's humorous friend from the Civic Republic.
- Matthew August Jeffers as Nat: An engineer from a caravan of survivors who befriends Michonne.
- Breeda Wool as Aiden: A pregnant survivor and Bailey's girlfriend. Wool reprises her role from The Walking Dead.
- Andrew Bachelor as Bailey: Aiden's boyfriend who Michonne previously saved from walkers. Bachelor reprises his role from The Walking Dead.
- Erin Anderson as Elle: Aiden's sister and the leader of a large caravan of nomadic survivors.
- Julian Cihi as Benjiro: An artist from the Civic Republic who etches portraits of people onto old TVs and phones, including Michonne and Judith for Rick.
- Tessa Slovis as Cleo Clifton: A new Civic Republic consignee who works with Michonne.
- Seth Gilliam as Father Gabriel Stokes: The respected priest of the Alexandria Safe-Zone and Jadis' former lover. Gilliam reprises his role from The Walking Dead.
- Ben Dickey as Red: The leader of a trio of desperate survivors whom Rick and Michonne encounter in Yellowstone.
- Will Brill as Dalton: Red's younger brother.
- Han Van Sciver as Tina: Red's younger sister.
- Cailey Fleming as Judith Grimes: The adopted daughter of Rick and Michonne. Fleming reprises her role from The Walking Dead.
- Antony Azor as Rick "R.J." Grimes Jr: The son of Rick and Michonne. Azor reprises his role from The Walking Dead.

== Episodes ==
No.	Title	Directed by	Written by	Original release date	U.S. viewers (millions)
1	"Years"	Bert & Bertie	Story by : Scott M. Gimple & Danai Gurira & Andrew Lincoln; Teleplay by : Scott M. Gimple	February 25, 2024	0.896
In the five years since being taken by the CRM, (Note: As depicted in "What Comes After") Rick Grimes has tried to escape four times; on one occasion, he sent a message in a bottle to Michonne along with his belongings (Note: As depicted in "Rest in Peace") and chopping his own left hand off on another. Rick is assigned as a consignee, someone who spends six years doing work on the outskirts of the Civic Republic of Philadelphia before being allowed into the city. Rick dreams of a regular life with Michonne and eventually accepts an offer from Lieutenant Colonel Donald Okafor to join the CRM. Okafor reveals that after the initial outbreak, he disobeyed the U.S. military's scorched earth plan to destroy Philadelphia and helped the CRM, then the Pennsylvania National Guard, rebel by bombing U.S. Marines at Lincoln Financial Field before they could advance on Philadelphia, saving the city at the cost of his own wife, a Marine posted there. He attempts to recruit Rick and Pearl Thorne into his plan to change the CRM from the inside. After another failed escape attempt, and the destruction of Omaha by the CRM, Rick finally accepts his new life and a position building a CRM forward operating base in the Cascade Mountains. Recalling a story from his childhood, Rick agrees to join Okafor's plan, just before their helicopter is shot down and Okafor is killed by an explosive projectile. The attacker kills the other soldiers until she gets to Rick. She takes his helmet off and recognizes him, then takes her own mask off, revealing herself to be Michonne, who is reunited with Rick for the first time in years.
2	"Gone"	Bert & Bertie	Nana Nkweti & Channing Powell	March 3, 2024	0.880
Six years after Rick's supposed death, Michonne helps Aiden and Bailey (Note: As depicted in "What We Become") reunite with their massive caravan, but refuses to join it out of disgust over the caravan's rules and her determination to find Rick and go back to their children. Aiden, Bailey, and their friend Nat outfit Michonne for her journey and later come to her aid against a massive horde, having been inspired by Michonne to break away along with dozens of others. The group agrees to help Michonne in her search, but the CRM attacks with chlorine gas, (Note: As depicted in The Walking Dead: World Beyond.) killing everyone except for Michonne and Nat, who are forced to spend a year recovering from the damage done to their lungs and throats. Pressing on to the location mentioned in the boat's log book, Michonne and Nat find an abandoned and destroyed safe zone and dozens of burned bodies. Nat convinces Michonne to return to Alexandria, but to keep faith that Rick is still alive. On the way back, the two spot a CRM helicopter and attack it using Nat's explosives in retaliation for the death of their friends, when Michonne is reunited with Rick. Nat is killed by a surviving CRM soldier, who Rick then kills. As more soldiers close in, Rick helps Michonne create a successful cover story for the CRM, promising that they will escape together. However, Rick is confronted by Jadis, who had recognized Michonne and threatens him if they try to escape, while Michonne desires to take down the CRM, despite Rick's warnings that they will never get home if they try to.
3	"Bye"	Michael Slovis	Gabriel Llanas & Matthew Negrete	March 10, 2024	0.905
In a flashback, Jadis approaches Rick in Millennium Park, and explains her people's deal with the CRM and her intention to sign up. However, Rick is only interested in escaping. After returning to base, Rick enlists Thorne's help in successfully getting Michonne into the consignment program, but Jadis warns that if Rick and Michonne escape, she will have to kill everyone that he loves for security. Rick attempts to help Michonne escape on her own, but she refuses to go without him. While touring Millennium Park, Michonne meets the artist who created Rick's engraved iPhones and finds new hope. After receiving the Echelon Briefing – the revelation of all of the CRM's secrets – and a promotion, Thorne becomes unsure of whether to follow in Okafor's footsteps, reluctantly enlisting Michonne's help for the mission. When Michonne goes rogue during a walker fight, Thorne nearly kills her, and Rick ends their relationship in an attempt to protect her. Having earned Major General Beale's trust, Rick is slated to receive a promotion in advance of a summit of the CRM's entire leadership. However, Michonne throws herself and Rick out of a helicopter in a daring mid-air escape on the return trip in the middle of a severe thunderstorm.
4	"What We"	Michael Slovis	Danai Gurira	March 17, 2024	0.876
After jumping from the helicopter, Rick and Michonne fall into a river outside of Greenwood, a community of innovators formed in an apartment tower after the apocalypse began that still has utilities and modern amenities. However, Greenwood fell at some point, likely to starvation, leaving it overrun with walkers. Michonne tries to convince Rick to go back home with her, revealing they have a son together named Rick Jr., but Rick still refuses to go back, telling her Jadis will kill everyone they know if they escape. They find out the helicopter they were in crashed in the storm, giving them the perfect opportunity to escape, since the CRM will believe Rick and Michonne to be dead; however, Rick still says he won't go home with her, intending to complete Okafor's mission to reform the CRM into something better. Michonne decides to leave Rick behind, with Rick going after her shortly after. A CRM helicopter bombs the wreckage to destroy any evidence of the CRM's existence, trapping Rick and Michonne in an increasingly unstable Greenwood. Rick and Michonne reconnect and, after fighting off walkers, have sex. After this, Michonne gets through to Rick, resulting in him admitting that he can't see Carl's face anymore due to his traumas and that he's terrified to be with Michonne again as Rick wouldn't survive losing her again. After Michonne gives Rick an iPhone engraved with Carl's portrait, she convinces Rick to go home with her. Rick and Michonne escape as Greenwood collapses and take one of the community's hybrid vehicles, which has enough ethanol to get them home to Alexandria.
5	"Become"	Michael E. Satrazemis	Gabriel Llanas & Matthew Negrete	March 24, 2024	0.815
In flashbacks, Jadis – going by her real name of Anne – visits Gabriel once a year, privately admitting that, while she's dedicated to the CRM's mission, she is conflicted about the lengths that the CRM goes to. Gabriel insists that Anne is still a good person, proven by her inability to kill Gabriel. In the present, making a rest stop on their way to Alexandria, Rick and Michonne encounter and fight off a family of bandits and spend the night in Yellowstone National Park, where Jadis, having deduced their survival, finds them. Jadis unsuccessfully tries to kill them and is badly wounded. She runs away and the couple goes after her in a car chase. Jadis then pulls the bandits into it, with Rick and Michonne being unable to kill Jadis due to her dossier that threatens Alexandria's safety. Jadis reveals that Rick was slated to receive the Echelon Briefing and move up in the CRM, and she reaches a deal where Rick will return to the CRM while Michonne can go home, but they double-cross each other and Jadis is fatally bitten by a walker in the melee. Jadis explains that after losing her people, (Note: As depicted in "The Lost and the Plunderers".) she dedicated herself to a cause that seemed like it would last. Deciding to die as Anne rather than as Jadis, she tells them where to find the dossier at Cascadia Base and gives Rick a wedding ring that Gabriel had found for him. At her request, Rick shoots Anne. Rick gives Michonne the wedding ring and they formally exchange vows. He and Michonne then decide to take Jadis' helicopter and returns to the CRM in order to find the dossier and stop them once and for all. Realizing that Anne is dead after she fails to show up for their yearly meeting, a heartbroken Gabriel crafts a makeshift grave marker for her.
6	"The Last Time"	Michael E. Satrazemis	Scott M. Gimple & Channing Powell	March 31, 2024	0.852
Rick and Michonne return to Cascadia Base, where Michonne sneaks in and finds and destroys Jadis' dossier before attending a briefing for the Frontliners, at which Michonne learns that the CRM intends to abduct select children from Portland, one of the last remaining functional cities in the former United States, before destroying the city with chlorine gas. Rick is given the Echelon Briefing, in which Beale informs him of the truth about the destruction of Omaha and the Campus Colony and the upcoming attack on Portland. Beale reveals that, operating under the belief that humanity only has around fourteen years left, the CRM plans to declare martial law and take over the Civic Republic in a coup d'état to lead the destruction of all other survivor communities, scavenging their resources to ensure their own survival. Rick kills Beale with his own sword, and Rick and Michonne rig a makeshift bomb to the chlorine gas arsenal before being confronted by Thorne, who had deduced the truth about Michonne's identity. Michonne is forced to kill Thorne, and the bomb and the gas kill the CRM Force Command and all of the Frontliners. With the CRM's atrocities exposed, and its command structure decimated, the civilian government takes over and reforms the CRM to prioritize aiding other survivors, while enabling free travel to and from the city. Finally able to leave in peace, Rick and Michonne return home to Alexandria and are finally reunited with their children, Judith and R.J.

== Production ==
=== Development ===
In 2018, following his departure from the main Walking Dead series, it was announced that Andrew Lincoln would star in a trilogy of films focusing on Rick Grimes for AMC. Scott M. Gimple was set to write the screenplays, with production expected to begin in 2019. In 2019, a teaser trailer was unveiled, confirming the trilogy would be theatrical releases distributed by Universal Pictures. The Walking Dead creator Robert Kirkman was said to be "heavily" involved with the trilogy.

In July 2022, it was announced by Scott M. Gimple, Andrew Lincoln and Danai Gurira at San Diego Comic-Con that the trilogy would be repurposed into a mini-series for television, with Lincoln and Gurira reprising their roles from the original television series. The limited series consisted of six episodes. It was initially titled The Walking Dead: Rick & Michonne, then retitled to The Walking Dead: The Ones Who Live in July 2023.

=== Writing ===
The series was created by Gimple, Gurira and Lincoln, with an episode written by Gurira and Gimple serving as showrunner. The series was set up by The Walking Dead's series finale "Rest in Peace", which featured the return of Rick and Michonne.

=== Filming ===
Principal photography began on February 15, 2023, and wrapped on May 29, 2023, in New Jersey under the working title Summit. Additional filming and ADR would resume during the 2023 SAG-AFTRA strike due to an agreement between AMC and SAG-AFTRA.

== Release ==
The series premiered on February 25, 2024, on AMC and AMC+. The series was released on Blu-ray and DVD on September 10, 2024.

== Reception ==
=== Critical response ===
Review aggregation website Rotten Tomatoes reported that 88% of 55 critics gave The Walking Dead: The Ones Who Live a positive review. The website's critics consensus is, "A Walking Dead spinoff that balances past and present without skimping on blockbuster scope, The Ones Who Live is a consistent treat for longtime fans." Metacritic, which uses a weighted average, assigned a score of 61 out of 100 based on 13 critics, indicating "generally favorable reviews".

The Walking Dead: The Ones Who Live was included in lists of the best TV shows of 2024; it was listed #2 by MovieWeb in their list of the best TV shows as of April, and included in TheWrap's end of the year list as of December. In year-end lists, it was ranked #23 by Screen Rant, #22 by Hello! magazine, and included in Nerdist's list of the best 13 TV shows of 2024. The series was also included in Comic Book Resources's list of the 55 best drama TV shows of all time at #48 and on Collider's list of 60 best Netflix shows.

=== Awards and nominations ===
Award	Category	Nominee(s)	Result	Ref.
24th Annual Black Reel Awards	Outstanding Writing, Drama Series	Danai Gurira for "What We"	Nominated	
4th Astra TV Awards	Best Supporting Actress in a Broadcast Network or Cable Drama Series	Lesley-Ann Brandt	Nominated	
52nd Saturn Awards	Best Television Presentation	The Walking Dead: The Ones Who Live	Won	
52nd Saturn Awards	Best Actor on Television	Andrew Lincoln	Nominated	
52nd Saturn Awards	Best Actress on Television	Danai Gurira	Nominated	
52nd Saturn Awards	Best Guest Starring Role on Television	Matthew Jeffers	Nominated	
52nd Saturn Awards	Best Supporting Actress on Television	Pollyanna McIntosh	Nominated	
5th Critics' Choice Super Awards	Best Actress in a Superhero Series, Limited Series or Made-for-TV Movie	Danai Gurira	Nominated	

=== Viewership ===
The premiere episode received 3 million viewers after three days of viewing, making it the biggest premiere for a new AMC series since 2018. The episode was also the most-watched episode of any show ever on AMC+ and that Sunday was the biggest day for direct-to-consumer sign-ups in the history of AMC+. The series became available on Netflix on January 13, 2025, and became the #2 most-watched TV show in the U.S. on the service, as of January 16. The series is also ranked at #8 on the list of global top 10 shows for the week of January 13 to 19, receiving 2.3 million views, and a total of 11.7 million viewing hours. The show also ranked at #5 on the list of top 10 shows in the U.S. in its first week on the charts.
