= Averill Curdy =

American poet, and academic

Averill Ann Curdy is an American poet and academic.

== Life ==
She received her MFA from the University of Houston and her PhD from the University of Missouri.

Curdy worked as an arts administrator and as a marketing manager and technical editor.

Her work has appeared in Poetry, The Paris Review, Raritan and the Kenyon Review.

She lives in Chicago and is a professor at Northwestern University.

== Awards ==
- 2007 Literature Fellowship from the National Endowment for the Arts.
- 2005 Rona Jaffe Foundation Writers' Award
- 2007 Lannan Writing Marfa Residency Fellowship

== Works ==
- "Anatomical Angel", Poetry, (June 2006)
- "To the voice of the retired warden of Huntsville Prison (Texas death chamber)", Poetry, (June 2009)
- "Hardware", Poetry, (June 2009)
- "Probation", Poetry, (April 2005)
- "Femme Fatale", Slate, June 1, 2004
- First and last things: poems. University of Houston. 1999.
- From the lost correspondence: poems. University of Missouri-Columbia. 2004.
- Winged. New Michigan Press. 2005.
- Song & Error. Farrar, Straus and Giroux. 2013.

=== Editor ===
- Lynne McMahon; Averill Curdy, eds. (2006). he Longman anthology of poetry. Pearson/Longman. ISBN 978-0-321-11725-0.
