= Amy Leach (writer) =

American non-fiction writer

- Writing career
- Genre: creative non-fiction
- Notable awards: Whiting Award, Rona Jaffe Foundation Writers' Award, Pushcart Prize

Amy Leach is an American non-fiction essayist known for her lyrical, imaginative writing style that remains firmly grounded in the natural world. Her work has appeared in The Best American Essays, The Best American Science and Nature Writing, and Granta, as well as the Iowa Review, A Public Space, and the Wilson Quarterly. She received a Rona Jaffe Foundation Writers' Award in 2008, a Whiting Award in Nonfiction in 2010, and a Pushcart Prize.

== Life ==
Leach grew up in Texas as a Seventh-day Adventist. She graduated from the University of Iowa with an MFA in creative nonfiction. Leach has stated that her writing is influenced by Emily Dickinson and Walt Whitman.

She currently lives in Bozeman, Montana, where she teaches creative writing at Montana State University. She plays bluegrass music, piano, and violin.

== Works ==
=== Books ===
- Things That Are, Milkweed Editions, June 19, 2012.
- The Everybody Ensemble: Donkeys, Essays, and Other Pandemoniums, Farrar, Straus and Giroux. November 16, 2021.
- The Salt of the Universe: Praise, Songs, and Improvisations, Farrar, Straus and Giroux. August 6, 2024.

=== Articles ===
- "The Medium of Surprise", Guernica, December 6, 2021.
- “Strangers”, A Public Space, Issue 27
- "Sail On, My Little Honey Bee", A Public Space, Issue 7
- "The Trappists", The Iowa Review, Volume 26, Issue 1. Spring 2006.
- "Warbler Delight", Identity Theory, December 19, 2006.
- "When Trees Dream of Being Trees", The Daily Pallette January 17, 2006.
