= Anne Winters (poet) =

American poet

Anne Winters is an American poet, leftist, and professor of English at the University of Illinois at Chicago. Having received an early university education at both New York University and Columbia University in New York City, where she was born and raised, she went on to complete her PhD at the University of California, Berkeley. She has studied, in various schools, under the well-known American poets Allen Tate, Randall Jarrell and Robert Lowell. She currently teaches British literature, the Bible (Winters is well-versed in classical Greek, Latin and Hebrew), and graduate courses in translation and poetry.

New York City is the primary subject of her poems. She has won several national awards, most recently the William Carlos Williams Award and Lenore Marshall Poetry Prize for 'The Displaced of Capital.' She was the recipient of a 2006 Guggenheim fellowship, and a 1997 Rona Jaffe Foundation Writers' Award.

== Bibliography ==
=== Poetry ===
- The Key to the City (1986)
- The Displaced of Capital (2004)

=== Translation ===
- Salamander: Selected Poems of Robert Marteau (1979) (translated from the French)
