= Tupelo Press =

American literary press

- Founded: 1999
- Founder: Jeffrey Levine
- Country of origin: United States
- Headquarters location: North Adams, Massachusetts
- Publication types: Books
- Official website: www.tupelopress.org

Tupelo Press is an American not-for-profit literary press founded in 1999. It produced its first titles in 2001, publishing poetry, fiction and non-fiction. Originally located in Dorset, Vermont, the press has since moved to North Adams, Massachusetts.

== History, staff and funding ==
Tupelo Press was founded by Jeffrey Levine, Publisher and artistic director, and author of three collections of poetry. The staff includes Kristina Marie Darling Editor-in-Chief of Tupelo Press and Tupelo Quarterly, David Rossitter, Managing Editor; Cassandra Cleghorn, Associate Editor for Poetry & Nonfiction, and Kirsten Miles, National Director of the 30/30 Project and National Coordinator for Tupelo Press Seminars.

Tupelo Press publishes the winners of its national poetry competitions, as well as manuscripts accepted through general submission. Awards given by Tupelo Press include the Dorset Prize, the Berkshire Prize for a First or Second Book of Poetry, and the Snowbound Series Chapbook Award.

Tupelo Press titles were previously distributed by Consortium Book Sales & Distribution, but in 2010 they left Consortium to create an independent distribution venture. Tupelo Press books are also available from Ingram, Baker & Taylor, and Small Press Distribution. The press receives support from the National Endowment for the Arts, private foundations, and individuals through donations, book sales, and annual subscriptions.

Tupelo Press partnered with the College of Charleston and the literary journal Crazyhorse to establish the Crazyhorse/Tupelo Press Publishing Institute to address the demand for "well-qualified editors and publishers...and to augment the career prospects of emerging writers... The institute is a graduate-level program open to writers at any post-baccalaureate level, whether finished with a graduate program in creative writing, currently enrolled or considering attending one."

In 2013, Tupelo Press began partnering with the Hill-Stead Museum for the Sunken Garden Poetry Prize, a prestigious national poetry prize for adult writers. Established in 2002, the Prize has drawn submissions from around the country that have been judged by renowned poets such as Martha Collins, Patricia Smith and Tony Hoagland.

== Notable authors and honors ==
Notable authors published by Tupelo Press include Lawrence Raab, Jeffrey Harrison, Amaud Jamaul Johnson, Ruth Ellen Kocher, Mark Halliday, G.C. Waldrep, Larissa Szporluk, Dan Beachy-Quick, Ellen Doré Watson, Ilya Kaminsky, Jennifer Militello, Aimee Nezhukumatathil, Rigoberto González, Annie Finch, Matthew Zapruder, Natasha Sajé, Joan Houlihan, Thomas Centolella, Maggie Smith, Lauren Camp and Ted Deppe.

Their authors have been recipients of many awards including the Whiting Awards, the Lannan Literary Fellowship, the Pushcart Prize, the ForeWord Magazine Poetry Book of the Year, the Addison M. Metcalf Award in Literature, San Francisco State University Poetry Center Book Award, Norma Farber First Book Award, NEA Literature Fellowships and Guggenheim Fellowship, the PEN Open Book Award and numerous other honors. Tupelo Press titles have been reviewed in The Los Angeles Times, Publishers Weekly, The New Yorker, Library Journal, Booklist, The Women’s Review of Books, Ploughshares, The Philadelphia Inquirer, and many other publications.

Tupelo also publishes a series of poetry in translation, including the work of such internationally respected authors and translators as Polina Barskova (translated by Ilya Kaminsky, Matthew Zapruder and Katie Farris), René Char (translated by Nancy Naomi Carlson), and Joumana Haddad (translated by Khaled Mattawa).

== Sources ==
- Tupelo Press Website
