= Jeffrey Levine (poet) =

American poet

Jeffrey Levine is an American poet, publisher, musician, and attorney. He is the author of three poetry collections, including The Kinnegad Home for the Bewildered, forthcoming from Salmon Press in March 2019.

== Life ==
Levine earned his B.A. from the University at Albany, SUNY, where he majored in music and English. After graduating, he taught at Skidmore College and played with the Albany Symphony Orchestra, later becoming a member of the Buffalo Philharmonic Orchestra. He attended the University at Buffalo Law School, SUNY, and worked briefly as a criminal defense lawyer before beginning his career in corporate law. He was working as a corporate lawyer in New York City and playing clarinet professionally when he began writing poetry. In late 1999 he founded Tupelo Press, an independent poetry press originally located in Dorset, Vermont, and since moved to the Eclipse Mill in North Adams, Massachusetts. Levine also holds an MFA in poetry from Warren Wilson College, and continues as Editor-in-Chief and Publisher of Tupelo Press.

His poems have been published in many literary journals and magazines including Ploughshares, Antioch Review, Poetry International, Virginia Quarterly Review, Quarterly West, Barrow Street, Yankee Magazine, and The Journal. His honors include the Larry Levis Prize from The Missouri Review, the James Hearst Poetry Prize from North American Review, the Mississippi Review Poetry Prize, the Kestrel Poetry Prize, and most recently, the 2007 American Literary Review Poetry Prize.

== Published works ==
Most recent: The Kinnegad Home for the Bewildered Salmon Press, 2019

- Kinnegad Home for the Bewildered (Salmon Press, 2019) ISBN 9781912561384
- Rumor of Cortez (Red Hen Press, 2005) ISBN 9781597090049
- Mortal Everlasting (Pavement Saw Press, 2002) ISBN 9781886350731
