= Ama Codjoe =

American social justice activist, dancer and a Pushcart-nominated poet

- Education: Ohio State University (MFA) New York University (MFA)
- Occupations: Writer, artist, dancer
- Writing career
- Notable works: Bluest Nude, Blood of the Air
- Notable awards: Lenore Marshall Poetry Prize; 2023 Whiting Award; 2023 Arts and Letters Award in Literature from the American Academy of Arts and Letters; 2024
- Website: amacodjoe.com

Ama Codjoe is an American social justice activist, dancer and a Pushcart-nominated poet. Codjoe's debut poetry collection, Bluest Nude, won the Lenore Marshall Poetry Prize and the Whiting Award in 2023. Bluest Nude was also a finalist for the NAACP Image Award for Outstanding Poetry, the Kate Tufts Discovery Award, and the Paterson Poetry Prize. Codjoe has been awarded support from Bogliasco, Cave Canem, Robert Rauschenberg, and Saltonstall foundations as well as from Callaloo Creative Writing Workshop, Hedgebrook, Yaddo, Hawthornden Literary Retreat, Willapa Bay AiR, MacDowell, and the Amy Clampitt Residency. Among other honors, Codjoe has received fellowships from the Rona Jaffe Foundation, the National Endowment for the Arts, the Bronx Council on the Arts, the New York State Council/New York Foundation of the Arts, and the Jerome Foundation. In 2023, Codjoe was appointed as the second Poet-in-Residence at the Guggenheim Museum.

== Work ==
Codjoe's poetry is heavily inspired by and references other poets, visual artists, pieces, and performances. Some notable artists who she has cited as influences are Simone Leigh, Pina Bausch, Trisha Brown, Sharon Olds, Terrance Hayes, Denise Murrell, Lorraine O'Grady, David Hammons, and Kerry James Marshall.

In addition to her work in poetry, she has also worked as director the DreamYard Art Center, as a teacher in the arts and activism program at The ACTION Project, as a faculty member at the National Guild for Community Arts Education Leadership Institute, and a Visiting Assistant Professor of Social Justice and Inclusion at The New School.

== Education ==
- Codjoe received her M.F.A. in Dance Performance from Ohio State University and her M.F.A. in Creative Writing from New York University.

== Bibliography ==
- Blood of the Air. Northwestern University Press, 2020. ISBN 9780810141711
- Bluest Nude. Milkweed Editions, 2022. ISBN 9781571315427
