= Kellie Wells (writer) =

American novelist

- Born: 1962 (age 63–64); Kansas City, Kansas, U.S.
- Occupation: Short story writer

Academic background
- Education: University of Kansas; University of Montana; Western Michigan University

Academic work
- Discipline: English
- Institutions: Washington University in St. Louis

Kellie Wells (born 1962) is an American professor of English, novelist, and short story writer.

== Life ==
Kellie Wells graduated from the University of Kansas with a BS in journalism and a BA in English. She received MFAs from the University of Montana and the University of Pittsburgh, and a PhD from Western Michigan University. Previously the director of the graduate writing program at Washington University in St. Louis, Wells now teaches at the University of Alabama, where she is also a member of the advisory board for The Tusculum Review. She also teaches in the low-residency MFA program at Pacific University. She is currently teaching and directing at the MFA program at The University of Alabama.

Her work has appeared in The Kenyon Review, The Gettysburg Review, Prairie Schooner, Ninth Letter, and Fairy Tale Review among others.

== Awards ==
- 2001 Flannery O'Connor Award for Short Fiction
- 2002 Rona Jaffe Foundation Writers' Award
- 2002 Great Lakes Colleges Association New Writers Award
- 2014 Baltic Writing Residency
- 2016 Sullivan Prize in Short Fiction

== Works ==
- God, the Moon, and Other Megafauna. Notre Dame University Press. 2017.
- Fat Girl, Terrestrial. FC2. October 2012. ISBN 978-1573661706.
- Skin. University of Nebraska Press. March 2006. ISBN 978-0-8032-4824-3.
- Compression Scars. University of Georgia Press. September 2002. ISBN 978-0-8203-2431-9.

=== Anthologies ===
- Kate Bernheimer, ed. (2010). My Mother She Killed Me, My Father He Ate Me. Penguin Books. ISBN 978-0-1431178-4-1.
- Kevin Brockmeier, ed. (2010). Real Unreal: Best American Fantasy 3. Underland Press. ISBN 978-0-9802260-8-9.
- Michael Martone, ed. (2009). Not Normal, Illinois: Peculiar Fictions from the Flyover. Indiana University Press. ISBN 978-0-253-21022-7.
- Mark Budman; Tom Hazuka, eds. (2007). You Have Time For This. Ooligan Press. ISBN 978-1-932010-17-6.
- Dylan Nelson; Kent Nelson, eds. (2004). Birds in the Hand. Northpoint Press. ISBN 978-0-86547-673-8.
- Sarah Gordon, ed. (2000). Flannery O'Connor: In Celebration of Genius. Hill Street Press. ISBN 978-1-892514-66-0.
