= Whiting Awards =

American award presented annually to emerging writers

Whiting Award
- Awarded for: Achievement by emerging writers in fiction, nonfiction, poetry, and drama
- Country: United States
- Presented by: Whiting Foundation
- Formerly called: Whiting Writers' Awards
- Reward: US$50,000
- First award: 1985
- Website: www.whiting.org/writers/awards/current-winners

The Whiting Award is an American award presented annually to ten emerging writers in fiction, nonfiction, poetry and drama. The award is sponsored by the Mrs. Giles Whiting Foundation and has been presented since 1985. As of 2021, winners receive US$50,000.

The nominees are chosen through a juried process, and the final winners are selected by a committee of writers, scholars, and editors, selected each year by the Foundation. Writers cannot apply for the prize themselves, and the Foundation does not accept unsolicited nominations.

Since 2018, the foundation has also awarded Literary Magazine Prizes to US-based nonprofit publications whose audience is adult readers. Prize-winning magazines are invited to work with the Foundation over the course of three years and receive outright grants of $10,000–$20,000 in the first year followed by matching grants in the second and third years.

== Recipients ==
Whiting Award winners
Year	Category	Author	Ref.
1985	Fiction	Howard Norman	
1985	Fiction	James Robison	
1985	Fiction	Raymond Abbott	
1985	Fiction	Stuart Dybek	
1985	Fiction & Non-fiction	Wright Morris	
1985	Fiction & Non-fiction	Austin Wright	
1985	Poetry	Douglas Crase	
1985	Poetry	James Schuyler	
1985	Poetry	Jorie Graham	
1985	Poetry	Linda Gregg	
1986	Drama	August Wilson	
1986	Fiction	Denis Johnson	
1986	Fiction	Kent Haruf	
1986	Fiction	Mona Simpson	
1986	Fiction	Padgett Powell	
1986	Fiction & Non-fiction	Darryl Pinckney	
1986	Poetry	Frank Stewart	
1986	Poetry	Hayden Carruth	
1986	Poetry	John Ash	
1986	Poetry	Ruth Stone	
1987	Drama	Reinaldo Povod	
1987	Fiction	Alice McDermott	
1987	Fiction	David Foster Wallace	
1987	Fiction	Deborah Eisenberg	
1987	Fiction	Joan Chase	
1987	Fiction	Pam Durban	
1987	Non-fiction	Gretel Ehrlich	
1987	Non-fiction	Mindy Aloff	
1987	Poetry	Mark Cox	
1987	Poetry	Michael Ryan	
1988	Fiction	Bruce Duffy	
1988	Fiction	Jonathan Franzen	
1988	Fiction	Lydia Davis	
1988	Fiction	Mary La Chapelle	
1988	Fiction	William T. Vollmann	
1988	Non-fiction	Geoffrey O'Brien	
1988	Non-fiction	Gerald Early	
1988	Poetry	Li-Young Lee	
1988	Poetry	Michael Burkard	
1988	Poetry	Sylvia Moss	
1989	Drama	Timberlake Wertenbaker	
1989	Fiction	Ellen Akins	
1989	Fiction	Marianne Wiggins	
1989	Fiction & Non-fiction	Tobias Wolff	
1989	Non-fiction	Ian Frazier	
1989	Non-fiction	Lucy Sante	
1989	Non-fiction	Natalie Kusz	
1989	Poetry	C. D. Wright	
1989	Poetry	Mary Karr	
1989	Poetry	Russell Edson	
1990	Drama	Tony Kushner	
1990	Fiction	Christopher Tilghman	
1990	Fiction	Lawrence Naumoff	
1990	Fiction	Mark Richard	
1990	Fiction	Stephen Wright	
1990	Fiction	Yannick Murphy	
1990	Non-fiction	Amy Wilentz	
1990	Non-fiction	Harriet Ritvo	
1990	Poetry	Dennis Nurkse	
1990	Poetry	Emily Hiestand	
1991	Drama	Scott McPherson	
1991	Fiction	Allegra Goodman	
1991	Fiction	Cynthia Kadohata	
1991	Fiction	John Holman	
1991	Fiction	Rebecca Goldstein	
1991	Fiction	Rick Rofihe	
1991	Fiction & Non-fiction	J Anton Shammas	
1991	Non-fiction	Stanley Crouch	
1991	Poetry	Franz Wright	
1991	Poetry	Thylias Moss	
1992	Drama	José Rivera	
1992	Drama	Keith Reddin	
1992	Drama	Suzan-Lori Parks	
1992	Fiction	Damien Wilkins	
1992	Fiction	J.S. Marcus	
1992	Fiction	R.S. Jones	
1992	Non-fiction	Eva Hoffman	
1992	Non-fiction & Poetry	Katha Pollitt	
1992	Poetry	Jane Mead	
1992	Poetry	Roger Fanning	
1993	Drama	Kevin Kling	
1993	Fiction	Dagoberto Gilb	
1993	Fiction	Janet Peery	
1993	Fiction	Jeffrey Eugenides	
1993	Fiction	Lisa Shea	
1993	Fiction	Sigrid Nunez	
1993	Poetry	Dionisio D. Martinez	
1993	Poetry	Kathleen Peirce	
1993	Poetry	Mark Levine	
1993	Poetry	Nathaniel Mackey	
1994	Fiction	Kate Wheeler	
1994	Fiction	Louis Edwards	
1994	Fiction	Mary Hood	
1994	Fiction & Non-fiction	Randall Kenan	
1994	Non-fiction	Claudia Roth Pierpont	
1994	Non-fiction	Kennedy Fraser	
1994	Non-fiction	Rosemary Mahoney	
1994	Non-fiction &Poetry	Wayne Koestenbaum	
1994	Non-fiction &Poetry	Mary Swander	
1994	Poetry	Mark Doty	
1995	Fiction	Matthew Stadler	
1995	Fiction	Melanie Sumner	
1995	Fiction	Michael Cunningham	
1995	Fiction	Reginald McKnight	
1995	Non-fiction & Poetry	Lucy Grealy	
1995	Non-fiction	André Aciman	
1995	Non-fiction	Russ Rymer	
1995	Non-fiction	Suzannah Lessard	
1995	Poetry	James McMichael	
1995	Poetry	Mary Ruefle	
1996	Fiction	A.J. Verdelle	
1996	Fiction	Anderson Ferrell	
1996	Fiction	Brian Kiteley	
1996	Fiction	Cristina García	
1996	Fiction	Judy Troy	
1996	Fiction	Molly Gloss	
1996	Fiction & Non-fiction	Chris Offutt	
1996	Fiction & Non-fiction	Patricia Storace	
1996	Poetry	Brigit Pegeen Kelly	
1996	Poetry	Elizabeth Spires	
1997	Drama	Erik Ehn	
1997	Fiction	Melanie Rae Thon	
1997	Fiction & Non-fiction	Josip Novakovich	
1997	Fiction & Non-fiction	Suketu Mehta	
1997	Non-fiction	Ellen Meloy	
1997	Non-fiction	Jo Ann Beard	
1997	Poetry	Connie Deanovich	
1997	Poetry	Forrest Gander	
1997	Poetry	Jody Gladding	
1997	Poetry	Mark Turpin	
1998	Drama	W. David Hancock	
1998	Fiction	Michael Byers	
1998	Fiction & Non-fiction	Ralph Lombreglia	
1998	Non-fiction	Anthony Walton	
1998	Non-fiction	D. J. Waldie	
1998	Poetry	Charles Harper Webb	
1998	Poetry	Daniel Hall	
1998	Poetry	Greg Williamson	
1998	Poetry	James Kimbrell	
1998	Poetry	Nancy Eimers	
1999	Drama	Naomi Iizuka	
1999	Fiction	Ben Marcus	
1999	Fiction	Ehud Havazelet	
1999	Fiction	Yxta Maya Murray	
1999	Fiction	ZZ Packer	
1999	Non-fiction	Gordon Grice	
1999	Non-fiction	Margaret Talbot	
1999	Poetry	Martha Zweig	
1999	Poetry	Michael Haskell	
1999	Poetry	Terrance Hayes	
2000	Drama	Kelly Stuart	
2000	Fiction	Colson Whitehead	
2000	Fiction	John McManus	
2000	Fiction	Lily King	
2000	Fiction	Robert Cohen	
2000	Fiction	Samantha Gillison	
2000	Non-fiction	Andrew X. Pham	
2000	Poetry & Fiction	Albert Mobilio	
2000	Poetry	Claude Wilkinson	
2000	Poetry	James Thomas Stevens	
2001	Drama	Brighde Mullins	
2001	Fiction	Akhil Sharma	
2001	Fiction	Emily Carter	
2001	Fiction	John Wray	
2001	Fiction	Matthew Klam	
2001	Fiction	Samrat Upadhyay	
2001	Non-fiction	Judy Blunt	
2001	Non-fiction	Kathleen Finneran	
2001	Poetry	Jason Sommer	
2001	Poetry	Joel Brouwer	
2002	Drama	Evan Smith	
2002	Drama	Melissa James Gibson	
2002	Fiction	Danzy Senna	
2002	Fiction	Jeffery Renard Allen	
2002	Fiction	Justin Cronin	
2002	Fiction	Kim Edwards	
2002	Fiction	Michelle Huneven	
2002	Poetry	David Gewanter	
2002	Poetry	Elizabeth Arnold	
2002	Poetry	Joshua Weiner	
2003	Drama	Sarah Ruhl	
2003	Fiction	Agymah Kamau	
2003	Fiction	Alexander Chee	
2003	Fiction	Ann Pancake	
2003	Fiction	Jess Row	
2003	Fiction	Lewis Robinson	
2003	Fiction	Courtney Angela Brkic	
2003	Non-fiction	Christopher Cokinos	
2003	Non-fiction	Trudy Dittmar	
2003	Poetry	Major Jackson	
2004	Drama	Elana Greenfield	
2004	Drama	Tracey Scott Wilson	
2004	Fiction	Daniel Alarcón	
2004	Fiction	Kirsten Bakis	
2004	Fiction	Victor LaValle	
2004	Non-fiction	Allison Glock	
2004	Non-fiction	John Jeremiah Sullivan	
2004	Poetry	A. Van Jordan	
2004	Poetry	Catherine Barnett	
2004	Poetry	Dan Chiasson	
2005	Drama	Rinne Groff	
2005	Fiction	Sarah Shun-lien Bynum	
2005	Fiction	Nell Freudenberger	
2005	Fiction	Seth Kantner	
2005	Fiction	John Keene	
2005	Poetry	John Keene	
2005	Poetry	Thomas Sayers Ellis	
2005	Poetry	Ilya Kaminsky	
2005	Poetry	Dana Levin	
2005	Poetry	Spencer Reece	
2005	Poetry	Tracy K. Smith	
2006	Drama	Bruce Norris	
2006	Drama	Stephen Adly Guirgis	
2006	Fiction	Charles D’Ambrosio	
2006	Fiction	Micheline Aharonian Marcom	
2006	Fiction	Nina Marie Martínez	
2006	Fiction	Patrick O’Keeffe	
2006	Fiction	Yiyun Li	
2006	Poetry	Sherwin Bitsui	
2006	Poetry	Suji Kwock Kim	
2006	Poetry	Tyehimba Jess	
2007	Drama	Sheila Callaghan	
2007	Drama	Tarell Alvin McCraney	
2007	Fiction	Ben Fountain	
2007	Fiction	Brad Kessler	
2007	Fiction	Dalia Sofer	
2007	Non-fiction	Carlo Rotella	
2007	Non-fiction	Jack Turner	
2007	Non-fiction	Peter Trachtenberg	
2007	Poetry	Cate Marvin	
2007	Poetry	Paul Guest	
2008	Drama	Dael Orlandersmith	
2008	Fiction	Benjamin Percy	
2008	Fiction	Laleh Khadivi	
2008	Fiction	Lysley Tenorio	
2008	Fiction	Manuel Muñoz	
2008	Fiction	Mischa Berlinski	
2008	Non-fiction	Donovan Hohn	
2008	Poetry	Douglas Kearney	
2008	Poetry	Julie Sheehan	
2008	Poetry	Rick Hilles	
2009	Drama	Rajiv Joseph	
2009	Fiction	Adam Johnson	
2009	Fiction	Nami Mun	
2009	Fiction	Salvatore Scibona	
2009	Fiction	Vu Tran	
2009	Non-fiction	Hugh Raffles	
2009	Non-fiction	Michael Meyer	
2009	Poetry	Jay Hopler	
2009	Poetry	Jericho Brown	
2009	Poetry	Joan Kane	
2010	Drama	David Adjmi	
2010	Fiction	Lydia Peelle	
2010	Fiction	Michael Dahlie	
2010	Fiction	Rattawut Lapcharoensap	
2010	Non-fiction	Amy Leach	
2010	Non-fiction	Elif Batuman	
2010	Non-fiction	Saïd Sayrafiezadeh	
2010	Poetry	Jane Springer	
2010	Poetry	L.B. Thompson	
2010	Poetry	Matt Donovan	
2011	Drama	Amy Herzog	
2011	Fiction	Daniel Orozco	
2011	Fiction	Ryan Call	
2011	Fiction	Scott Blackwood	
2011	Fiction	Teddy Wayne	
2011	Non-fiction	Paul Clemens	
2011	Poetry	Don Mee Choi	
2011	Poetry	Eduardo C. Corral	
2011	Poetry	Kerri Webster	
2011	Poetry	Shane McCrae	
2012	Drama	Danai Gurira	
2012	Drama	Meg Miroshnik	
2012	Drama	Mona Mansour	
2012	Drama	Samuel D. Hunter	
2012	Fiction	Alan Heathcock	
2012	Fiction	Anthony Marra	
2012	Fiction	Hanna Pylväinen	
2012	Non-fiction	Sharifa Rhodes-Pitts	
2012	Poetry	Atsuro Riley	
2012	Poetry	Ciaran Berry	
2013	Drama	Virginia Grise	
2013	Fiction	Amanda Coplin	
2013	Fiction	C.E. Morgan	
2013	Fiction	Hannah Dela Cruz Abrams	
2013	Fiction	Jennifer duBois	
2013	Fiction	Stephanie Powell Watts	
2013	Non-fiction	Clifford Thompson	
2013	Non-fiction	Hannah Dela Cruz Abrams	
2013	Non-fiction	Morgan Meis	
2013	Poetry	Ishion Hutchinson	
2013	Poetry	Rowan Ricardo Phillips	
2014	No Award Presented		
2015	Drama	Lucas Hnath	
2015	Drama	Anne Washburn	
2015	Fiction	Leopoldine Core	
2015	Fiction	Dan Josefson	
2015	Fiction	Azareen Van der Vliet Oloomi	
2015	Non-fiction	Elena Passarello	
2015	Poetry	Anthony Carelli	
2015	Poetry	Aracelis Girmay	
2015	Poetry	Jenny Johnson	
2015	Poetry	Roger Reeves	
2016	Drama	Madeleine George	
2016	Fiction	Mitchell S. Jackson	
2016	Fiction	Alice Sola Kim	
2016	Fiction	Catherine Lacey	
2016	Non-fiction	Brian Blanchfield	
2016	Non-fiction	J. D. Daniels	
2016	Poetry	LaTasha N. Nevada Diggs	
2016	Poetry	Safiya Sinclair	
2016	Poetry	Layli Long Soldier	
2016	Poetry	Ocean Vuong	
2017	Drama	Clare Barron	
2017	Drama	Clarence Coo	
2017	Drama	James Ijames	
2017	Fiction	Jen Beagin	
2017	Fiction	Kaitlyn Greenidge	
2017	Fiction	Lisa Halliday	
2017	Fiction	Tony Tulathimutte	
2017	Non-fiction	Francisco Cantú	
2017	Poetry	Simone White	
2017	Poetry	Phillip B. Williams	
2018	Drama	Nathan Alan Davis	
2018	Drama	Hansol Jung	
2018	Drama	Antoinette Nwandu	
2018	Fiction	Brontez Purnell	
2018	Fiction	Patrick Cottrell	
2018	Non-fiction	Anne Boyer	
2018	Non-fiction	Esmé Weijun Wang	
2018	Non-fiction	Weike Wang	
2018	Poetry	Anne Boyer	
2018	Poetry	Rickey Laurentiis	
2018	Poetry	Tommy Pico	
2019	Drama	Lauren Yee	
2019	Drama	Michael R. Jackson	
2019	Fiction	Hernan Diaz (writer)	
2019	Fiction	Merritt Tierce	
2019	Fiction	Nafissa Thompson-Spires	
2019	Non-fiction	Nadia Owusu	
2019	Non-fiction	Terese Marie Mailhot	
2019	Poetry	Kayleb Rae Candrilli	
2019	Poetry	Tyree Daye	
2019	Poetry	Vanessa Angélica Villarreal	
2020	Drama	Will Arbery	
2020	Fiction	Andrea Lawlor	
2020	Fiction	Genevieve Sly Crane	
2020	Fiction	Ling Ma	
2020	Non-fiction	Jaquira Díaz	
2020	Non-fiction	Jia Tolentino	
2020	Poetry	Aria Aber	
2020	Poetry	Diannely Antigua	
2020	Poetry	Genya Turovskaya	
2020	Poetry	Jake Skeets	
2021	Drama	Jordan E. Cooper	
2021	Drama	Donnetta Lavinia Grays	
2021	Drama	Sylvia Khoury	
2021	Fiction	Steven Dunn	
2021	Fiction	Tope Folarin	
2021	Non-fiction	Sarah Stewart Johnson	
2021	Poetry	Joshua Bennett	
2021	Poetry	Marwa Helal	
2021	Poetry	Ladan Osman	
2021	Poetry	Xan Phillips	
2022	Fiction	Claire Boyles	
2022	Fiction	Rita Bullwinkel	
2022	Fiction	Megha Majumdar	
2022	Fiction	Nana Nkweti	
2022	Non-fiction	Anaïs Duplan	
2022	Non-fiction	Alexis Pauline Gumbs	
2022	Non-fiction	Jesse McCarthy	
2022	Poetry	Ina Cariño	
2022	Poetry	Anthony Cody	
2022	Poetry	Claire Schwartz	
2023	Drama	Mia Chung	
2023	Fiction	Marcia Douglas	
2023	Fiction	Sidik Fofana	
2023	Fiction	Caribbean Fragoza	
2023	Fiction	R. Kikuo Johnson	
2023	Non-fiction	Linda Kinstler	
2023	Non-fiction	Stephania Taladrid	
2023	Poetry	Tommye Blount	
2023	Poetry	Ama Codjoe	
2023	Poetry & Drama	Milo Wippermann	
2024	Fiction	Aaliyah Bilal	
2024	Fiction	Yoon Choi	
2024	Fiction	Gothataone Moeng	
2024	Fiction	Ada Zhang	
2024	Drama	Shayok Misha Chowdhury	
2024	Drama	Frances Ya-Chu Cowhig	
2024	Non-fiction & Drama	Javier Zamora	
2024	Poetry	Elisa Gonzalez	
2024	Poetry	Taylor Johnson	
2024	Poetry	Charif Shanahan	
2025	Fiction	Claire Luchette	
2025	Fiction	Elwin Cotman	
2025	Fiction	Emil Ferris	
2025	Fiction	Samuel Kọ́láwọlé	
2025	Fiction	Shubha Sunder	
2025	Drama	Liza Birkenmeier	
2025	Non-fiction	Aisha Sabatini Sloan	
2025	Non-fiction	Sofi Thanhauser	
2025	Poetry	Karisma Price	
2025	Poetry	Annie Wenstrup	
2026	Fiction	Elaine Castillo	
2026	Fiction	Hilary Leichter	
2026	Fiction	Lara Mimosa Montes	
2026	Drama	Celine Song	
2026	Non-fiction	Negar Azimi	
2026	Non-fiction	Karen Hao	
2026	Non-fiction	Carvell Wallace	
2026	Poetry	Hajar Hussaini	
2026	Poetry	Brittany Rodgers	
2026	Poetry	Alison C. Rollins	
