= Ellen Doré Watson =

American poet, translator and teacher

Ellen Doré Watson is an American poet, translator and teacher.

== Career ==
Watson is author of six collections of poems, most recently, pray me stay eager (Alice James Books). Her book, Ladder Music, was a New York/New England Award winner from Alice James Books. Other honors include a Massachusetts Cultural Council Artists Grant and a 1997 Rona Jaffe Foundation Writers' Award.

Watson has translated eleven books, including The Alphabet in the Park: The Selected poems of Adélia Prado (Wesleyan University Press), for which she was awarded an NEA Translation Fellowship and interviewed by BOMB Magazine. In addition to her Brazilian Portuguese translations, the Winter 1999 issue of Modern Poetry in Translation features contemporary Palestinian poetry she co-translated from the Arabic with Saadi Simawe.

Her poems have appeared in literary journals, including Orion Magazine, Ploughshares, Boulevard, The Cortland Review, AGNI, The American Poetry Review, Tin House, and The New Yorker, and in anthologies including After Shocks: The Poetry of Recovery for Life-Shattering Events (Santa Lucia Books, 2008), Ravishing DisUnities: Real Ghazals in English, (Wesleyan University Press, 2000), and Never Before: Poems About First Experiences (Four Way Books, 2005).

Watson grew up in Plainview, New York, and received her B.A. and MFA from the University of Massachusetts Amherst, and lives in Conway, Massachusetts. She is the director of The Poetry Center at Smith College, and Lecturer in the English Department, where she teaches Reading Contemporary Poetry. She is a poetry editor for The Massachusetts Review, and a member of the Alice James Books Cooperative Board.

== Published works ==
Full-Length Poetry Collections

- pray me stay eager (Alice James Books)
- Dogged Hearts (Tupelo Press, 2010)
- This Sharpening (Tupelo Press, 2006)
- Ladder Music (Alice James Books, 2002)
- We Live in Bodies (Alice James Books, 1997)

Chapbooks

- Broken Railings (Owl Creek Press, Winner of the Green Lake Chapbook Poetry Prize)

Selected Translations

- Zero, by Ignácio de Loyola Brandão (Dalkey Archive Press, 2003)
- The Alphabet in the Park: The Selected poems of Adélia Prado (Wesleyan University Press, 1990)
- The Tree of the Seventh Heaven, by Milton Hatoum, Antheneum, 1994
- High Art, by Rubem Fonseca, Harper & Row, 1986
- The Tower of Glass, by Ivan Angelo, Avon Books, 1985
- And Still the Earth, by Ignácio de Loyola Brandão, Avon Books, 1985
- "The Truth is a Seven-Headed Animal", by Milton Hatoum, Grand Street, Spring 1998
- The Mystical Rose: Selected Poems, by Adélia Prado, Bloodaxe Books (U.K.), Nov. 2014
- Ex-Voto: Poems, by Adélia Prado, Tupelo Press, September 2013
- The Alphabet in the Park: Selected Poems of Adélia Prado, Wesleyan University Press/University Press of New England, 1990; 2nd Edition 1994
- "Seductive Sadness Winks at Me" and "The Alphabet in the Park," by Adélia Prado, The FSG Book of Twentieth-Century Latin American Poetry, FSG, 2011
- "Denouement," "Serenade," and "The Tenacious Devil Who Doesn't Exist," by Adélia Prado, The Ecco Anthology of International Poetry, Ecco, 2010
- "The Transfer of the Body," The Literary Olympians: An International Anthology, Fox-Brown & Company, 1992

== Sources ==
- Tupelo Press
- Alice James Books
- Rona Jaffe Foundation Writers' Award
- Orion Magazine
- downstreet.net
- bigtoereview.com
- The Massachusetts Review
- Ploughshares
- Smith College
