= Oprah's Book Club 2.0 =

- Sponsored by: Oprah Winfrey Network; O: The Oprah Magazine
- Location: Worldwide
- Presented by: Oprah Winfrey
- First award: 2012
- Website: Website

Oprah's Book Club 2.0 is a book club founded June 1, 2012, by Oprah Winfrey in a joint project between OWN: The Oprah Winfrey Network and O: The Oprah Magazine. The club is a re-launch of the original Oprah's Book Club, which ran for 15 years and ended in 2011, but as the "2.0" name suggests, digital media is the new focus. It incorporates the use of various social media platforms (Facebook, Twitter) and e-readers that allow for the quoting and uploading of passages and notes for discussion, among other features.

On March 25, 2019, Apple Inc. and Oprah announced a revival of a video version of Oprah's Book Club that will air on Apple TV+.

== History ==
The book club was announced June 1, 2012. Critics at the time pointed out that her online audience was not as large as it was previously with network television, and the new club would be a test if she still had the "Oprah Effect" with the reading public to create hits as before. As the New York Times Book Review reported a few months later, in the August 19 issue, Cheryl Strayed's Wild had dropped off the New York Times Best Seller List by May 20, but after its selection by Oprah in early June, it reached No. 1 Non-fiction by July 15, and stayed there for many weeks, thus, said the Times, confirming the "Oprah Effect" still worked.

== Oprah's Book Club 2.0 selections ==
Date	Author	Title	Citation
June 2012	Cheryl Strayed	Wild: From Lost to Found on the Pacific Crest Trail	
December 2012	Ayana Mathis	The Twelve Tribes of Hattie	
January 2014	Sue Monk Kidd	The Invention of Wings	
February 2015	Cynthia Bond	Ruby	
August 2016	Colson Whitehead	The Underground Railroad	
September 2016	Glennon Doyle Melton	Love Warrior	
June 2017	Imbolo Mbue	Behold the Dreamers	
February 2018	Tayari Jones	An American Marriage	
June 2018	Anthony Ray Hinton	The Sun Does Shine: How I Found Life and Freedom on Death Row	
November 2018	Michelle Obama	Becoming	
September 2019	Ta-Nehisi Coates	The Water Dancer	
November 2019	Elizabeth Strout	Olive, Again	
April 2020	Robert Kolker	Hidden Valley Road: Inside the Mind of an American Family	
June 2020	James McBride	Deacon King Kong	
November 2020	Isabel Wilkerson	Caste: The Origins of Our Discontents	
March 2021	Marilynne Robinson	Gilead; Home; Lila; Jack	
June 2021	Nathan Harris	The Sweetness of Water	
August 2021	Honorée Fanonne Jeffers	The Love Songs of W.E.B. Du Bois	
September 2021	Richard Powers	Bewilderment	
February 2022	Martha Beck	The Way of Integrity: Finding the Path to Your True Self	
April 2022	Viola Davis	Finding Me	
June 2022	Leila Mottley	Nightcrawling	
September 2022	Jarvis Jay Masters	That Bird Has My Wings: The Autobiography of an Innocent Man on Death Row	
October 2022	Barbara Kingsolver	Demon Copperhead	
February 2023	Susan Cain	Bittersweet: How Sorrow and Longing Make Us Whole	
March 2023	Ann Napolitano	Hello Beautiful	
May 2023	Abraham Verghese	The Covenant of Water	
September 2023	Nathan Hill	Wellness	
October 2023	Jesmyn Ward	Let Us Descend	
February 2024	Lara Love Hardin	The Many Lives of Mama Love: A Memoir of Lying, Stealing, Writing, and Healing	
May 2024	Colm Tóibín	Long Island	
June 2024	David Wroblewski	Familiaris	
September 2024	Elizabeth Strout	Tell Me Everything	
October 2024	Lisa Marie Presley; Riley Keough	From Here to the Great Unknown	
December 2024	Claire Keegan	Small Things Like These	
January 2025	Eckhart Tolle	A New Earth: Awakening to Your Life's Purpose (also selected in January 2008)	
February 2025	Eric Puchner	Dream State	
March 2025	Amy Griffin	The Tell	
April 2025	Tina Knowles	Matriarch: A Memoir	
May 2025	Ocean Vuong	The Emperor of Gladness	
June 2025	Wally Lamb	The River Is Waiting	
July 2025	Bruce Holsinger	Culpability	
August 2025	Richard Russo	Bridge of Sighs	
September 2025	Elizabeth Gilbert	All the Way to the River: Love, Loss, and Liberation	
October 2025	Megha Majumdar	A Guardian and a Thief	
November 2025	Ann Packer	Some Bright Nowhere	
February 2026	Tayari Jones	Kin	
April 2026	Maria Semple	Go Gentle	
May 2026	Douglas Stuart	John of John	
June 2026	Sophie Chen Keller	Little Wonder	
October 2026	Amanda Rizkalla	Hungered	
November 2026	Mary Lawson	Solace in Winter	

== Controversies ==
On January 21, 2020, Oprah announced her next book club selection would be American Dirt by Jeanine Cummins. The novel, about a Mexican woman fleeing to America after being targeted by a drug cartel, came under scrutiny as Cummins was a white woman with no connection to Mexico and marketing for the book claimed she had a special connection to the material because her husband had at one point been an undocumented immigrant without ever revealing he was a white Irishman. 142 authors including R. O. Kwon, Tommy Orange and Valeria Luiselli penned an open letter asking Oprah to rescind her endorsement of the book.

My Dark Vanessa by Kate Elizabeth Russell was originally selected for March 2020, but dropped after Russell was accused, without evidence, of plagiarizing Wendy C. Ortiz's 2014 memoir Excavation. According to the Associated Press, "Reviewers who looked at both books saw no evidence of plagiarism."
