= Leaving Atlanta =

2002 debut novel by Tayari Jones

- Cover of Leaving Atlanta
- Author: Tayari Jones
- Genre: Fiction, Coming of Age, Historical Fiction
- Published: 1 August 2002
- Publisher: Warner Publishing Grand Central Publishing
- ISBN: 978-0446690898
- Followed by: The Untelling

Leaving Atlanta is the first novel by the American author Tayari Jones. The book was published by Warner Books in 2002. Jones's experiences through the Atlanta child murders of 1979–1981 largely inspired the book. During the time of the murders, Jones attended Oglethorpe Elementary School. The book focuses on the lives and experiences of three fictional fifth graders at Oglethorpe Elementary: Tasha Baxter, Rodney Green, and Octavia Fuller. The book is dedicated to "twenty-nine and more," of the children who were kidnapped and killed before, during, and after the Atlanta Child Murders.

== Background ==
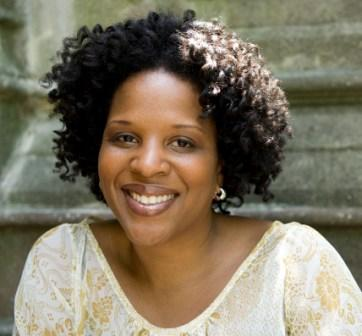
Tayari Jones, author of Leaving Atlanta.

Leaving Atlanta focuses on three fictional students at Oglethorpe Elementary School: Tasha Baxter, Rodney Green, and Octavia Fuller. Jones chose to use children's perspectives for her novel, "to make a record of how life was for those of us who were too young to understand the complicated social and political landscape of Atlanta, the 'city too busy to hate.'” Leaving Atlanta explores the interconnectedness of age, race, class, and politics in the proclaimed "Black Mecca" during the Atlanta Child Murders.

In her "Author's Note", Jones mentions she made some alterations to the historic chronology of the Atlanta Child Murders to suit the novel.

=== Author ===
When the Child Murders began, Jones was nine years old, attending Oglethorpe Elementary School. She writes in the "Reader's Guide" for the book, "but the time had come for someone of my generation, to tell the tale from the vantage point of the playground. This novel is a memorial to twenty-nine (or more) who did not survive and it the testimony of the thousands who will never forget."

While Jones is from Atlanta, writing about Atlanta is not intentional. Jones has noted that she writes what she knows, which is her hometown of Atlanta and the people in it. This has led her contemporaries to consider her a Southern writer, a label that she does not reject but recognizes it as one part of who she is as a writer.

== Point of view ==
Each part of the novel is written from a different narrative point of view. “Part One: Magic Words” is written in the third-person through LaTasha Baxter’s perspective; “Part Two: The Opposite Direction of Home” is written in the second-person through Rodney Green’s perspective; and “Part Three: Sweet Pea” is written in the first-person through Octavia Fuller’s perspective.

Because the story is told through the perspective of children it focuses on the experience of humanity instead of humanity fighting against oppressive forces. The innocence of children is taken into perspective, and the reader sees the world through the eyes of pure-hearted children.

== Synopsis ==
=== Part One: Magic Words ===
LaTasha Baxter returns to school after summer vacation, having practiced jacks and jump rope, as she tries to fit into the social structure of her fifth grade classroom. At the same time, she is dealing with her parents' separation, and the reality that children are going missing and turning up dead. In the novel, the murders are initially introduced when nine photos of children are shown while Tasha Baxter and her family watch the news, which Monica Kaufman, the first black woman to anchor the Atlanta evening news, delivers.

One night Tasha goes to the roller rink with her best friend. At the roller rink, she runs into her crush, Jashante. He buys her M&Ms and gives her a pine scented air freshener, which he usually sells for cash. When Jashante disappears, Tasha blames herself for his disappearance and subsequent death, since she cursed him after he pushed her on the playground, ripping the pink coat her father gave her. At the end of part one, Tasha gives her little sister, DeShaun, Jashante's air freshener, telling DeShaun it is a protective charm.

In Part One, Octavia Fuller and Rodney Green are introduced as the social outcasts of Tasha's fifth grade classroom. Tasha briefly befriends Octavia but ultimately does not pursue their friendship because Tasha is afraid of becoming a social outcast through association with Octavia, who many of their classmates bully because of her dark skin.

=== Part Two: The Opposite Direction of Home ===
Rodney Green, a fifth-grader at Oglethorpe Elementary, is introduced with a scene highlighting Rodney's fear of his father. Throughout Part Two, Rodney and Octavia begin to develop a friendship, in part as a result of both being ignored or made fun of by the rest of their classmates. This section also shows Rodney's habit of stealing candy from a local gas station, which he shares with his little sister and Octavia. However, Rodney has a good relationship with Mrs. Lewis, the gas station owner. Mrs. Lewis is a parental figure for Rodney.

Because of the events of Part One, Rodney's class receives a visit from a police officer named Officer Brown, to speak about "personal safety". Rodney expresses that, because of the visit, he's more nervous about the murders because Officer Brown is the only protection they have against being attacked and murdered. At the end of the visit, Officer Brown shows the class a genuine police badge, stating that a person pretending to be an officer will not have one, specifying that only genuine officers' badges have raised lettering.

One day, Rodney gets caught stealing candy from Mrs. Lewis after trying to help his classmate Leon, and she tells him to be careful of who he hangs around with. The section ends with Rodney running away after his father beats him in front of his classmates for stealing candy. As he is running away, a man in a blue sedan stops him and claims to be a police officer. The police badge he shows to Rodney is an obvious fake because of its shape and smooth surface. Although Rodney states that he knows the man is not a real police officer, Rodney gets into the van anyway because he wants to go in the opposite direction of home and away from his abusive father.

=== Part Three: Sweet Pea ===
Part Three of Leaving Atlanta focuses on Octavia Fuller, who is called Sweet Pea by her loved ones. In this section of the novel, Octavia deals with the grief of Rodney's kidnapping and assumed death. Octavia also deals with the guilt of feeling like it is her fault that her Uncle Kenny was kicked out of their house. Octavia's intentions were to "save" her uncle from the doctor turning away medical treatment, after her mother told her needles found on the ground and being picked up will result in a doctor refusing to help. Octavia innocently informs her mother that her uncle had needles in bag while he was living with them. Octavia is also trying to navigate her relationship with her mother.

While walking to school one day, Octavia and her neighbors come across a Guardian Angel from New York that was acting as a neighborhood watch — guarding the children in the neighborhood. On their way to school, Delvis, Octavia's friend and neighbor asks the Guardian Angel, “They don’t have no black Angels in New York that they could have sent down here?” Octavia says, “Delvis, them Angels alright. When I saw them on the news they were with Miss Camille Bell. They work the evenings with the Bat Patrollers.”

Ultimately, Octavia's mother sends her to away from Atlanta to live with her father, who works for a university, in South Carolina, step mother, and step baby sister. Octavia's mother, Yvonne, wants her daughter to have better life opportunities than she feels she can provide her daughter. Further, Yvonne wants Octavia to avoid the kidnappings and child murders happening in Atlanta, especially after Octavia gave scared her mother by deliberately going to a park close to home one day while her mother was at work. Octavia knew not to leave her house when her mother was working considering all the child disappearances that were occurring.

== Characters ==
=== Main characters ===
- LaTasha Baxter: An eleven-year-old girl transitioning into middle school during the child murders; she is the focal point for Part One: Magic Words. LaTasha begins to navigate life as a middle schooler as she deals her parents separation, popularity at school, and the disappearance of her classmates.
- Rodney Green: A fifth grader who deals with life at school and with his abusive father; he is the focal point for Part Two: The Direction Opposite of Home. Rodney manages his school life while dealing with peer pressure, his father, and an equally unpleasant teacher.
- Octavia Fuller: A fifth grader who is in the process of moving from her mother’s home to live in South Carolina with her father; she is the focal point for Part Three: Sweet Pea. She also comes to terms with the aftermath of her classmates’ kidnappings.

=== Supporting characters ===
- Delores Baxter: LaTasha’s mother and current guardian of LaTasha and DeShaun.
- Charles Baxter: LaTasha’s father, who is separated from his wife Delores. Even though he does not live with his family, Charles is still concerned about their safety and well-being. He lives close by and eventually moves back in with his family.
- DeShaun Baxter: LaTasha’s younger sister, who follows her sister around throughout the first part of the novel.
- Tayari Jones: A sixth-grader who interacts with some of the characters, and the namesake of the author.
- Jashante Hamilton: An older classmate who tries to befriend LaTasha. When his attempts fail, he resorts to bullying her. Shortly after Tasha curses him (and her father Charles inadvertently condemned him), he is kidnapped and presumed dead.
- Mr. Harrell: A teacher at Oglethorpe Elementary School. He is strict and formal with the students.
- Virginia Lewis: The local candy shop owner who works near the school. She is trusting of Rodney, who frequents her store. Eventually, she catches Rodney stealing candy and tells him to be wary of the people he hangs out with.
- Claude L. Green/Father: Rodney’s father. He is shown as a demeaning parent at the beginning of Part Two, but he is later shown to be physically abusive to Rodney. It is later revealed that Mr. Green was treated the same way by his father.
- Edna Lee Grier: One of the teachers at Southwest Middle School. She offers advice to Octavia throughout Part Three.
- Yvonne Fuller: Octavia’s mother and current guardian. Before setting her daughter up to move out of the city, Yvonne received help from her neighbors to watch Octavia and the other neighborhood kids.
- Ray: Octavia’s father; he lives in South Carolina with his other family. He and Yvonne agree that Octavia should move to South Carolina to avoid the child murders in Atlanta.
- Uncle Kenny: Octavia’s uncle and Yvonne’s brother. Octavia inadvertently found needles in Kenny’s bag and her mother found out about it; Octavia feels guilty after her mother kicked Kenny out of the house.but later we find out he molested her since he moved in with them, part of her resented him.
- Grandma: Octavia’s grandmother and Yvonne's mother. She does not approve of Octavia living in Atlanta.

== Publishing history ==
Leaving Atlanta was first published by Warner Publishing on August 1, 2002. When Time Warner Book Group was sold to Hachette Book Group in 2006 the company became Grand Central Publishing under Hachette Book Group, which Leaving Atlanta is now published under.

== Genre ==
The publisher, Grand Central Publishing, describes Leaving Atlanta as fiction and coming-of-age. As the book was inspired by and focuses on the Atlanta child murders of 1979 - 1981, the novel is also historical fiction.

== Movie ==
In 2007, Aletha Spann of 30Nineteen Productions sought to renew the film rights for the novel. The film rights for the novel were officially bought by Spann in 2011. However, there is no known movie currently in production.

== Atlanta's racial history ==
Maurice J. Hobson analyzes the rise of the "Black Mecca" and explores the reasoning behind the Atlanta Child Murders. In his analysis, Hobson discusses the racial disparity between white and black elites and the poor and working-class black communities. During the 1960s Atlanta's black population grew exponentially, landing Maynard Jackson the role of Atlanta's first Black Mayor. The first black Mayor excited black Atlantan's because they were ready to see a change in the black communities; however, this wasn't the case. Maynard Jackson becoming Mayor enlarged the pockets of white and black elites, leaving the poor and working-class black communities worse. The 'city too busy to hate' projected an image of equality and opportunity; unfortunately, this came at the cost of the most vulnerable people in society. The Atlanta Child Murders lasted from 1979 to 1982. Furthermore, the "Black Mecca" exceeded expectations educationally, economically, and politically while simultaneously experiencing atrocities such as the Atlanta Child Murders.

== Analysis ==
Eric Gary Anderson, an English professor, analyzes Leaving Atlanta from an ecosocial perspective of the child murders. Anderson's analysis asserts that Leaving Atlanta is as much a story about the murders as it is about how Atlanta was a ripe ground for the murders. Comparing the factual locations of the victims bodies to how Jones uses landscape and aspects of the physical environment to evoke specific reactions to what the characters are experiencing, Anderson argues that the environment itself feels diseased with the complex social and political issues that were in Atlanta at the time. Jones creates this picture with specific scenes relating to the environment: Rodney breathing in the fumes of the car belonging to his kidnapper, Octavia breathing in her mother's perfume as she prepares to leave Atlanta, and the increasingly empty playground as both Jashante and Rodney go missing.

Melanie Benson Taylor addresses the diasporic effect of the specific brand of racially motivated murder: leaving via death or leaving to escape death in the case of Octavia. Jones and Toni Cade Bambara through Those Bones are Not My Child, create a fictional picture of the very real diaspora post and pre Child Murders. James Baldwin also explores this in his essay, The Evidence of Things Not Seen.

In GerShun Avilez’s analysis of Leaving Atlanta, he highlights the premonition of doom that Rodney encounters domestically. Avilez analyzes Rodney and his family dynamics by delving into the terrors birthed from his abusive father. The narrative broadens how the lack of intimacy and warmth in Rodney’s family develops his fears and coerces him into succumbing to parental terror. Rodney’s fear of the ongoing abductions and murders in the city gets blurred by the constant thought that his father will kill him before the murderer ever reaches him. Avilez’s analysis explains that Rodney’s internalized fear of his father is why he chooses to get into the car of the fake police officer. Since his biggest threat was living in his house, Rodney chooses the possibility of getting murdered by being with the fake police officer and heading in the opposite direction of home.

In Trudier Harris' analysis of Leaving Atlanta, it is brought to attention how the novel’s point of view shifts in alignment with the personality of the chapter's respective child: LaTasha, Rodney, and Octavia. Readers are introduced to the narrative through Tasha’s section, by a traditional third person limited point of view. The third person limited point of view is representative of her comforting nuclear family dynamic and represents a well protected child during the period of the Atlanta Child Murders. The second chapter introduces Rodney’s section through a second person point of view which produces a distanced narration. His narrative is enhanced using second person narration and distances the reader in the same way Rodney distances himself from his own life, particularly his father (out of fear) and grade school tribulations. Lastly, we are introduced to Octavia, a child with a single mother, who narrates her own story in a first person point of view which emphasizes her independence, maturity, and sensitivity. These point of views are broken down as the chapters go on and present how a child's vulnerability changes with their familial structures and home life, especially within the context of the Atlanta Child Murders.

== Reception ==
Leaving Atlanta has received several awards and accolades including being chosen in 2013 by Brazos Valley Reads, an organization led by Texas A&M University’s Department of English. The program provided Jones an opportunity to travel to College Station for a public reading and attend other literary events.

After Leaving Atlanta was initially released, Bookpage acknowledged, as one of the best twenty-five debut novels of the decade in 2002. The Hurston/Wright Foundation also awarded the novel its award for Debut Fiction. Local to the events, Leaving Atlanta was named "Novel of the Year" by Atlanta Magazine and the "Best Southern Novel of the Year" by Creative Loafing Atlanta.

=== Reviews ===
Jane Dystel, describes the novel as a “strongly grounded tale” that “hums with the rhythms of schoolyard life” in her 2002 Publishers Weekly review. In 2002, Kirkus Reviews described the novel as “technically ambitious, but not a story otherwise out of the ordinary. Leslie Marmon Silko called the book, "[a] wonderful novel," adding: "I look forward to reading Jones's work for years to come."

In a 2002 Book Page review Arlene McKanic accounts for Jones' writing by saying "but this powerful new novel isn’t what you might think. To her credit, Jones doesn’t present us with the point of view of the murderer," "What’s more remarkable is that she presents the voices of these children with rare precision." McKanic further goes on to say "The book’s ending is one of the most quietly devastating this reviewer has ever read. Leaving Atlanta, which deals with the effects of serial murder, is simply brilliant a gentle and beautiful book on a horrific subject. "
