= Pruno =

Type of alcoholic beverage made in prison

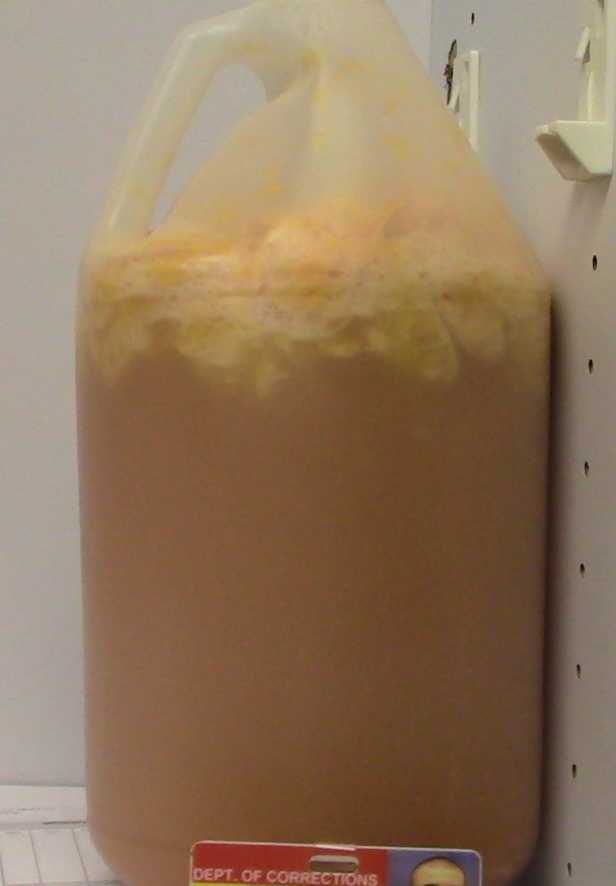
A one-US-gallon (3.8 L) jug of contraband prison wine made from oranges, confiscated from an inmate

Pruno, prison hooch and prison wine are terms used in the United States to describe an improvised alcoholic beverage. It is variously made from apples, oranges, fruit cocktail, fruit juices, hard candy, sugar, high fructose syrup, and possibly other ingredients, including crumbled bread. Bread is incorrectly thought to contain yeast for the pruno to ferment. Pruno originated in US prisons, where it can be produced with the limited selection of equipment and ingredients available to inmates. It can be made using only a plastic bag, hot running water, and a towel or sock to conceal the pulp during fermentation. The end result has been described as a "bile-flavored wine cooler". Depending on the time spent fermenting (always balanced against the risk of discovery by officers), the sugar content, and the quality of the ingredients and preparation, pruno's alcohol content by volume can range from as low as 2% (equivalent to a very weak beer) to as high as 14% (equivalent to a strong wine).

== Description ==
Typically, the fermenting mass of fruit—called the motor or kicker in US prison parlance—is retained from batch to batch to make the fermentation start faster. The more sugar is added, the greater the potential for a higher alcohol content—to a point. Beyond this point, the waste products of fermentation (mainly alcohol) cause the motor to die or go dormant as the yeasts' environment becomes too poisoned for them to continue fermenting. This also causes the taste of the end product to suffer. Ascorbic acid powder is sometimes used to stop the fermentation at a certain point, which, combined with the tartness of the added acid, somewhat enhances the taste by reducing the cloyingly sweet flavor associated with pruno.

In 2004 and 2005 botulism outbreaks were reported among inmates in two California prisons; the Centers for Disease Control and Prevention suspects that potatoes, a known source of the bacterium that causes botulism, used in making pruno were to blame in both cases. In 2012, similar botulism outbreaks caused by potato-based pruno were reported among inmates at prisons in Arizona and Utah.

Inmates are not permitted to have alcoholic beverages, and correctional officers confiscate pruno. In an effort to eradicate pruno, some wardens have gone as far as banning all fresh fruit, fruit juices, and fruit-based food products from prison cafeterias. But even this is not always enough; there are pruno varieties made almost entirely from sauerkraut and orange juice. Food hoarding in the inmate cells in both prisons and jails allows the inmates to acquire ingredients and produce pruno. During jail and prison inmate cell searches, correctional officers remove excessive or unauthorized food items to halt the production of pruno. Pruno is hidden under bunks, inside toilets, inside walls, trash cans, in the shower area and anywhere inmates feel is safe to brew their pruno away from the prying eyes of correctional officers and jailers.

Jarvis Jay Masters, a former death row inmate at San Quentin, offers an oft-referenced recipe for pruno in his poem "Recipe for Prison Pruno", which won a PEN award in 1992.

Another recipe for pruno can be found in Michael Finkel's Esquire article on Oregon death row inmate Christian Longo.

In 2004 at the American Homebrewers Association's National Homebrew Conference in Las Vegas, a pruno competition and judging was held.

== See also ==
- Flavored fortified wine
- Changaa
- Chicha
- Drinking culture
- Jenkem
- Kilju
- Kvas
- Moonshine (hooch)
- Pájaro verde
- Poitín
- Bootlegging
- Tepache
- Tharra
- White Lightning
