= Where'd You Go, Bernadette =

Where'd You Go, Bernadette may refer to:

- Where'd You Go, Bernadette (novel), 2012
- Where'd You Go, Bernadette (film), the 2019 film adaptation of the novel
