= Nora Ezell =

African-American quilter (1917–2007)

- Born: June 24, 1917; Brooksville, Mississippi
- Died: September 6, 2007 (Aged 90); Tuscaloosa, Alabama
- Known for: American quilter
- Style: Folk art

Nora Lee McKeown Ezell (June 24, 1917 – September 6, 2007) was an African-American quilter from Mantua, Alabama. She was known for her unique storytelling quilts and for her intricate patterns. In 1990, Ezell received the Alabama Folk Heritage Award and in 1992 was named a National Heritage Fellow from the National Endowment for the Arts.

== Biography ==
Ezell was born in Brooksville, Mississippi, the fourth daughter out of 10 children. Her family later moved to Mantua, Alabama. As a child, she learned quilt and sew from watching her mother and sisters, and taught herself her own technique.

Ezell left school in the eleventh grade to get married. The marriage did not work out, and Ezell and her young family were thrust into poverty. Ezell supported herself by picking cotton and working as a maid. In her free time, she began quilting. She later moved to New Jersey with her second husband.

Ezell originally followed quilting traditions using time honored patterns, such as "wedding ring" and "bear's paw", but gradually became known for her unique storytelling designs that were original to her. In 1979, Ezell returned to Greene County, Alabama to care for her daughter who was suffering from cancer. It was then that she began to create storytelling quilts based on scenes from the civil rights movement, including the life of Dr. Martin Luther King. She was known for her unique use of materials and embroidery.

Ezell began exhibiting her quilts in the 1980s, with an exhibition at Stillman College. In 1986, Ezell exhibited her Dr. Martin Luther King Jr. quilt in a national exhibition “Stitching Memories: African American Story Quilts” at Williams College in Massachusetts. The appearance of the quilt earned Ezell national acclaim. In 1990, she was awarded an Alabama Folk Heritage Award from the Alabama State Council for the Arts. In 1992, she was awarded a National Heritage Fellowship from the National Endowment for the Arts. In the 1990s, she began to take on quilting students for the joy of teaching.

In 1998, Ezell published her autobiography, My Quilts and Me: The Diary of an American Quilter, with Black Belt Press.

Ezell died in Tuscaloosa, Alabama of a stroke at age 88 on September 6, 2007.

== Collections ==
- "Civil Rights", Birmingham Museum of Art
- "Star Puzzle, Blazing Star variation" International Quilt Museum
- "Star Quilt", American Folk Art Museum
- "Everybody Quilt", American Quilt Study Center & Museum
- "A Tribute to Civil Righters of Alabama", Alabama Artist's Gallery
- “Everybody” or “Sampler”, Birmingham Museum of Art
- "Migration", Alabama Artists Gallery

== See also ==
- Lucy Mingo, Alabama quilter
- Yvonne Wells, Alabama quilter
- Loretta Pettway, Alabama quilter
