= Trudier Harris =

American literary historian (born 1948)

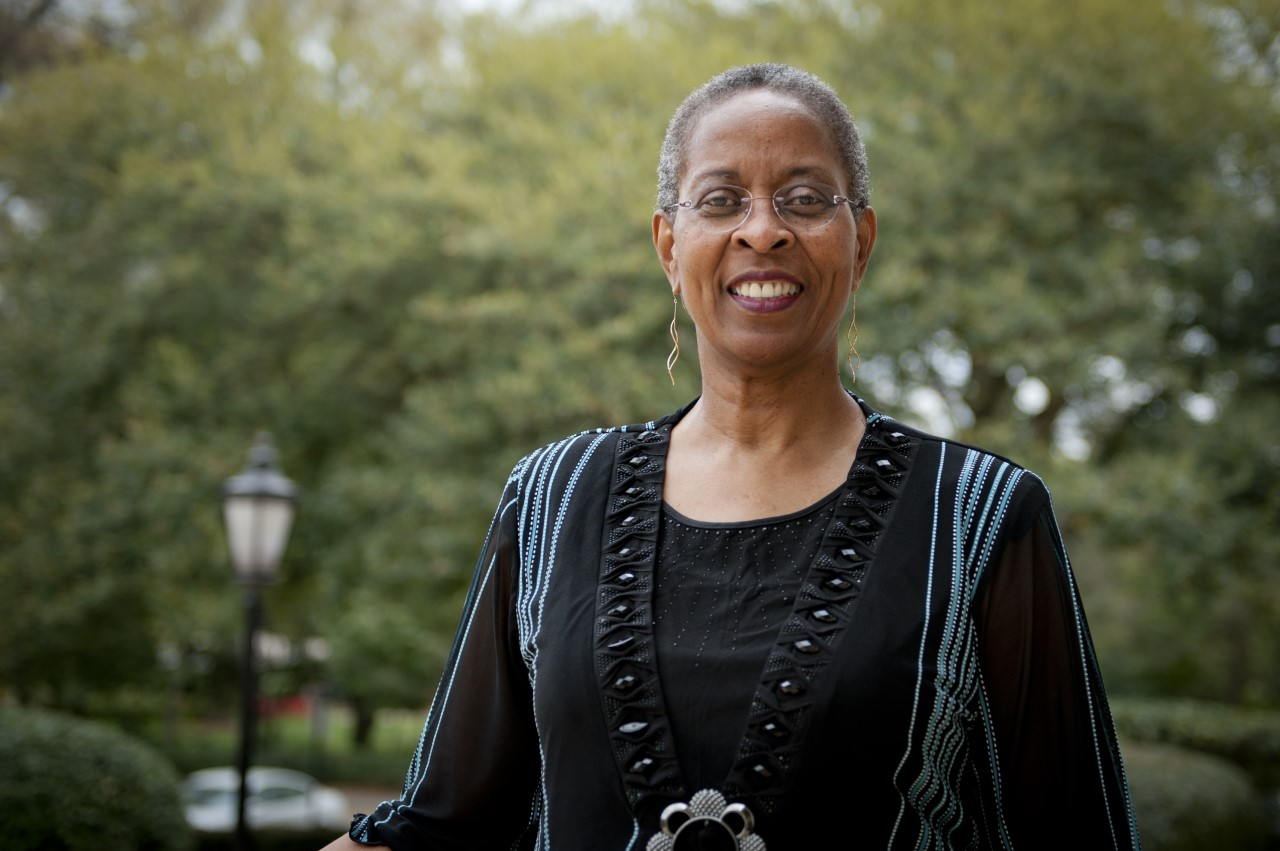
- Harris in 2015
- Born: February 27, 1948 (age 78); Mantua, Alabama, U.S.
- Education: Stillman College
- Occupations: Literary scholar, author, educator

Trudier Harris (born February 27, 1948) is an American literary scholar, author, writing consultor, and educator. She is a Professor Emerita at the University of Alabama and held the position of J. Carlyle Sitterson Distinguished Professor at University of North Carolina at Chapel Hill. Harris is a member of the Wintergreen Women Writers Collective.

== Background ==
Harris was born on February 27, 1948, in Mantua, Greene County, Alabama. She was the sixth of nine children born to Terrell Harris Sr. and Unareed Burton Moore Harris. Harris has three older sisters: Fannie Mae, Hazel Gray, and Eva Lee. She also has two older brothers: Terrell Jr. and Willie Frank. After Harris was born, her younger siblings Peter, Eddie Lee, and Annie (Anna) Louise were born.

Harris was named by her mother after a concert she went to see at Stillman College in Tuscaloosa, Alabama, while she was pregnant with Harris. The concert was performed by an artist named Cordelia and Harris's mother was fond of the last syllables of the singer's name. Her first name was misprinted on the original birth certificate as "Trudy", which Harris did not discover until the mid-1970s; soon after the discovery her name was corrected to Trudier, on the document, and Harris believes her mother was the one who corrected the certificate. Her name is something she is proud of because her mother crafted her name.

== Early life ==
Her early childhood years were spent on her 80-acre family owned cotton farm in Greene County, Alabama. She learned how to can vegetables and kill hogs to help contribute to the family’s work. The family farm was successful, but her father still had to face prejudices of the day, and was jailed for an entire year after being accused of stealing a bale of cotton. Her father died when Harris was six years old from a heart attack on September 4, 1954. After her father’s death, Unareed sold the family cotton farm and moved herself and all the kids to Tuscaloosa, Alabama. Harris and her siblings attended an all-black elementary school, which took some adjusting due to negative stigmas of being from the countryside. Harris and her siblings also had to eat the provided free lunch rather than being able to buy and pick their lunch, which also separated them from other students who were in higher economic social classes.

Harris participated in softball and basketball and maintained honor roll grades throughout her childhood. While the kids were in school Unareed worked as a domestic for white families, then later as a janitor and cook at an elementary school. For the majority of Harris’ early childhood she lived on Fosters Ferry Road and as she grew up her family moved to a house in Lincoln Park, Tuscaloosa, Alabama, where her sister Anna still lives today. Harris’ oldest brother, Terrell, was the first in the family to attend college and he attended Jackson State University in 1962 on an academic and athletic scholarship.

== Education and career ==
Harris attended the all-black Druid High School in Tuscaloosa, where she wrote her graduating class's senior play. After high school, she attended Stillman College in Tuscaloosa and was highly active on campus. She became president of her sorority, Zeta Phi Beta. She was also a student worker and served as an assistant to Dean John Rice, the father of future U.S. Secretary of State Condoleezza Rice. In college, Harris also started to participate in local protests as part of the civil rights movement. She graduated in 1969 with a B.A. degree in English and a minor in social studies. Harris and three of her other siblings were able to receive a degree from a higher level of education.

After receiving her undergraduate degree, Harris attended a summer exchange program at Indiana University, which inspired her to go onto graduate school. She attended Ohio State University in Columbus, Ohio, where she received her master's and doctoral degrees in American Literature and Folklore in 1973

After Harris graduated from Ohio State University, she was hired as a professor at the College of William & Mary, where she was the first African-American tenured professor. In 1979, she started teaching in the English department at the University of North Carolina at Chapel Hill (UNC). Harris was at UNC until 1993, when she briefly moved to work in Atlanta, Georgia, at Emory University until 1996, then transferred back to Chapel Hill, holding the position of J. Carlyle Sitterson Distinguished Professor. Harris retired in 2009 after 27 years of teaching courses in African-American literature and folklore at the University of North Carolina at Chapel Hill.

Harris became bored during retirement and decided to join the English department at the University of Alabama in her childhood town, Tuscaloosa. During her time at the University of Alabama, the Black Faculty and Staff Association established the "Dr. Trudier Harris Intercollegiate Black History Scholar Bowl". This is a yearly competition among surrounding universities in Alabama "to showcase their scholarly knowledge of African American History in a variety of categories". Harris served as a University Distinguished Research Professor of English until she retired for the second time in February 2022. After her retirement, she was named a Professor Emerita at the University of Alabama. Although Harris no longer works for the University of North Carolina at Chapel Hill or the University of Alabama, she still is an avid fan of Carolina basketball and the Crimson Tide football team.

In 2018, College of William & Mary awarded her an honorary degree.

== Awards and honors ==
- UNC Board of Governors Award for Excellence in Teaching (2005)
- William C. Friday/Class of 1986 Award for Excellence in Teaching (2000)
- National Humanities Center Fellowship for 2018–2019
- Research and Study Leave at UNC for Spring of 2005
- Institute for the Arts and Humanities (IAH) Fellowship at UNC (Fall, 2002)
- Institute for the Arts and Humanities (IAH) Fellowship to participate in a Leadership Seminar (Spring, 2002)
- SAMLA Honorary Member Award, 2021.
- SEC Faculty Achievement Award for the University of Alabama (2018)
- Clarence E. Cason Award in Nonfiction Writing (2018)

== Publications ==
=== Books ===
- From Mammies to Militants: Domestics in Black American Literature from Charles Chesnutt to Toni Morrison (University of Alabama Press, 2023). ISBN 0817360948
- Depictions of Home in African American Literature (Lexington Books, 2021). ISBN 1793649634
- Martin Luther King Jr., Heroism, and African American Literature (University of Alabama Press, 2014). ISBN 0817318445
- The Scary Mason-Dixon Line: African American Writers and the South (The Louisiana State University Press, 2009). Selected by Choice magazine as one of its "Outstanding Academic Titles" of 2009. ISBN 0807133957
- Summer Snow: Reflections from a Black Daughter of the South (memoir; Beacon Press, 2003). Excerpt reprinted in The Chronicle Review, April 11, 2003. Selected as the inaugural text for the "One-Book, One-Community" reading project in Orange County, North Carolina, 2003–2004. Paperback edition issued Fall 2006. ISBN 0807072540
- South of Tradition: Essays on African American Literature (The University of Georgia Press, 2002; 12 previously unpublished essays). ISBN 0820324337
- Reprints: "Transformations of the Land in Randall Kenan’s ‘The Foundations of the Earth'" in Black Literature Criticism, Vol. 2, ed. Jelena O. Krstovic (Detroit: Cengage Learning, 2008), pp. 300–306; "Salting the Land but Not the Imagination: William Melvin Kelley’s A Different Drummer" in Black Literature Criticism, Vol. 2, ed. Jelena O. Krstovic (Detroit: Cengage Learning, 2008), pp. 278–82; "The Necessary Binding: Prison Experiences in Three August Wilson Plays" in Drama Criticism, Vol. 31, ed. Thomas J. Schoenberg and Lawrence J. Trudeau (Detroit: Cengage Learning, 2008), pp. 272–79.
- Saints, Sinners, Saviors: Strong Black Women in African American Literature (Palgrave/St. Martin's, 2001). ISBN 0312293003
- The Power of the Porch: The Storyteller’s Craft in Zora Neale Hurston, Gloria Naylor, and Randall Kenan (University of Georgia Press, 1996). (Lamar Memorial Lectures) ISBN 0820318574
- Fiction and Folklore: The Novels of Toni Morrison (University of Tennessee Press, 1991). A section of Chapter Six, on Beloved, has been reprinted in "Beloved, she's mine": Essays Sur Beloved de Toni Morrison, eds Genevieve Fabre et Claudine Raynaud (Paris: Cetanla, 1993), pp. 91–100. ISBN 0870497081
- Black Women in the Fiction of James Baldwin (University of Tennessee Press, 1985). ISBN 0870494619
- Exorcising Blackness: Historical and Literary Lynching and Burning Rituals (Indiana University Press, 1984). Chapter 7 has been reprinted in The New Cavalcade: African American Writing 1760 to the Present, Volume II, eds Arthur P. Davis, J. Saunders Redding, and Joyce Ann Joyce (Washington, D. C.: Howard University Press, 1992), pp. 831–844. Excerpt reprinted in Black on White: Black Writers on What It Means to Be White, ed. David R. Roediger (New York: Schocken: 1998), pp. 299–304. ISBN 0253319951
- From Mammies to Militants: Domestics in Black American Literature (Philadelphia: Temple University Press, 1982). Chapter Three has been reprinted in Black Southern Voices: An Anthology of Fiction, Poetry, Drama, Nonfiction, and Critical Essays, eds John Oliver Killens and Jerry W. Ward, Jr. (New York: Meridian, 1992), pp. 564–590. ISBN 0877222797

=== As co-editor ===
- Reading Contemporary African American Drama: Fragments of History, Fragments of Self (New York: Peter Lang Publishing, 2007—with Jennifer Larson). ISBN 0820488860
- The Concise Oxford Companion to African American Literature (New York: Oxford, 2001).
- The Literature of the American South: A Norton Anthology (New York: W. W. Norton, 1998). ISBN 0393316718
- Call and Response: The Riverside Anthology of the African American Literary Tradition (Boston: Houghton Mifflin, 1998 [June 1997]). ISBN 0395809622
- The Oxford Companion to African American Literature (New York: Oxford University Press, 1997). ISBN 9780195065107
- The Oxford Companion to Women's Writing in the United States (New York: Oxford University Press, 1995; November 1994). [Edited essays on African-American women writers and topics related to the study of African-American literature. Harris wrote eight essays.] ISBN 0195066081
- Afro-American Poets After 1955 (Detroit: Gale Research Company, 1985). ISBN 0810317192
- Afro-American Writers After 1955: Dramatists and Prose Writers (Detroit: Gale Research Company, 1985). ISBN 0810317168
- Afro-American Fiction Writers After 1955 (Detroit: Gale Research Company, 1984). ISBN 0810317117

=== As editor ===
- New Essays on Baldwin’s Go Tell It on the Mountain (New York: Cambridge University Press, 1996). ISBN 0521498260
- Selected Works of Ida B. Wells-Barnett (New York: Oxford University Press, 1991).
- Afro-American Writers, 1940–1955 (Detroit: Gale Research Company, 1988). ISBN 0810345544
- Afro-American Writers from the Harlem Renaissance to 1940 (Detroit: Gale Research Company, 1987). ISBN 081031729X
- Afro-American Writers Before the Harlem Renaissance (Detroit: Gale Research Company, 1986). ISBN 0810317281

=== Contributions to books ===
- "African American Lives: Zora Neale Hurston, James Baldwin, Malcolm X, and Eldridge Cleaver". In Cambridge Companion to Autobiography, eds Emily O. Wittman and Maria DeBattista (New York: Cambridge University Press, 2014), pp. 180–194.
- "Untangling History, Dismantling Fear: Teaching Tayari Jones's Leaving Atlanta", for The Contemporary African American Literary Canon: Theory and Pedagogy, eds Lovalerie King and Shirley Turner-Moody (Bloomington: Indiana University Press, 2013), pp. 269–284.
- "Afterword: The Complexities of Home", Race and Displacement: Nation, Migration, and Identity in the 21st Century, ed. Maha Marouan and Merinda Simmons (Tuscaloosa: University of Alabama Press, 2013), pp. 211–220.
- "History as Fact and Fiction" for the Cambridge History of African American Literature, eds Maryemma Graham and Jerry W. Ward, Jr. (New York: Cambridge, 2011), pp. 451–496.
- "Celebrating Bigamy and Other Outlaw Behaviors: Hurston, Reputation, and the Problems Inherent in Labeling Janie a Feminist", in Approaches to Teaching Hurston's Their Eyes Were Watching God and Other Works, ed. John W. Lowe (New York: MLA Publications, 2009), 67–80.
- "Cotton Pickin’ Authority", in Shaping Memories: Reflections of African American Women Writers, ed. Joanne V. Gabbin (Jackson: The University Press of Mississippi, 2009), 155–162.
- "Fear of Family, Fear of Self: Black Southern 'Othering' in Randall Kenan's A Visitation of Spirits", in Women & Others: Perspectives on Race, Gender, and Empire, eds Celia R. Daileader, Rhoda E. Johnson, and Amilcar Shabazz (New York: Palgrave/Macmillan, 2007), 45–65.
- "Almost—But Not Quite—Bluesmen in Langston Hughes's Poetry", in Montage of a Dream: The Art and Life of Langston Hughes, eds John Edgar Tidwell and Cheryl R. Ragar (Columbia: University of Missouri Press, 2007), 32–38.
- "Trapped in Lines and Language: Distorted Selves in Personal Ads", Introduction to Racialized Politics of Desire in Personal Ads, eds Neal A. Lester and Maureen Daly Goggin (New York: Rowman & Littlefield, 2007), 1–5.
- "Watchers Watching Watchers: Positioning Characters and Readers in Baldwin's 'Sonny's Blues' and Morrison's 'Recitatif'", in James Baldwin and Toni Morrison: Comparative Critical and Theoretical Essays, eds Lovalerie King and Lynn Orilla Scott (New York: Palgrave/Macmillan, 2006), 103–120.
- "Foreword" to After the Pain: Critical Essays on Gayl Jones, eds Fiona Mills and Keith B. Mitchell (New York: Peter Lang, 2006), pp. x–xiv.
- "Porch Sitters" and "The Yellow Rose of Texas" for The Encyclopedia of African American Folklore, ed. Anand Prahlad (Greenwood, 2005), 991–993; 1403–1404.
- "Preface" to three-volume set on the Harlem Renaissance (Gale Research Company, 2003).
- "The Second Teacher in the Classroom", Preface to A Student's Guide to African American Literature, 1760 to the Present, ed. Lovalerie King (New York: Peter Lang, 2003).
- "Lynching and Burning Rituals in African-American Literature", in A Companion to African-American Philosophy, eds Tommy L. Lott and John P. Pittman (Blackwell Publishing, 2003), pp. 413–418.
- "The Ball of a Lifetime", in Age Ain't Nothing But a Number: Black Women Explore Midlife, ed. Carleen Brice (Beacon Press, 2003), 38–44. Reprinted in British edition, Fall 2004.
- "Genre", in Eight Words for the Study of Expressive Culture, ed. Burt Feintuch (University of Illinois Press, 2003), pp. 99–120.
- "Conjuring", "Lynching", "Lynch-Law", and "Voodoo" for The Companion to Southern Literature, eds Joseph Flora and Lucinda Mackethan (Louisiana State University Press, 2001).
- "This Disease Called Strength: The Masculine Manifestation in Raymond Andrews’ Appalachee Red", in Contemporary Black Men’s Fiction and Drama, ed. Keith S. Clark (University of Illinois Press, 2001), pp. 37–53. Reprinted in Black Literature Criticism, Vol. 1, ed. Jelena O. Krstovic (Detroit: Cengage Learning, 2008), pp. 46–54.
- "James Baldwin", Oxford United States History (New York: Oxford University Press, 2001).
- "The Power of Martyrdom: The Incorporation of Martin Luther King Jr. and His Philosophy into African American Literature", in Media, Culture, and the Modern African American Freedom Struggle, ed. Brian Ward (University Press of Florida, 2001), pp. 273–291.
- "Afterword: The Unbroken Circle of Assumptions", afterword to Body Politics and the Fictional Double, ed. Debra Walker King (Bloomington: Indiana University Press, 2000), pp. 178–185.
- "Before the Strength, the Pain: Portraits of Elderly Black Women in Early 20th Century Anti-Lynching Plays", in Black Women Playwrights: Visions on the American Stage, ed. Carol P. Marsh-Lockett (New York: Garland, 1999), pp. 25–42.
- "The Overweight Angel", in Honey Hush: An Anthology of African American Women's Humor, ed. Daryl Cumber Dance (New York: W. W. Norton, 1998), pp. 162–168.
- "Lying Through Our Teeth?: The Quagmire of Cultural Diversity", in Teaching African American Literature: Theory and Practice, eds Maryemma Graham, Sharon Pineault-Burke, and Marianna White Davis (New York and London: Routledge, 1998), pp. 210–222.
- "What is Africa to African American Women Writers?", in Contemporary Literature of the African Diaspora, ed. Olga Barrios and Bernard W. Bell (Leon, Spain: 1997), pp. 25–32.
- "What Women? What Canon?: African American Women and the Canon", in Speaking the Other Self: American Women Writers, ed. Jeanne Reesman (Athens: University of Georgia Press, 1997).
- "Before the Stigma of Race: Authority and Witchcraft in Ann Petry's Tituba of Salem Village", in Recovered Writers/Recovered Texts, ed. Dolan Hubbard (University of Tennessee Press, 1997), pp. 105–115.
- "The Yellow Rose of Texas: A Different Cultural View", in Juneteenth Texas: Essays in African-American Folklore, eds Francis E. Abernethy, Patrick B. Mullen, and Alan B. Govenar (Denton, Texas: University of Texas Press, 1996), pp. 314–333. Reprinted in Callaloo 20:1 (Winter 1997): 8–19.
- "August Wilson's Folk Traditions". Essay on Joe Turner's Come and Gone in August Wilson: A Casebook, ed. Marilyn Elkins (Garland, 1994), pp. 49–67.
- "Escaping Slavery But Not Its Images"—essay on Beloved in Toni Morrison: Critical Perspectives Past and Present, ed. Henry Louis Gates, Jr. and Kwame Anthony Appiah (Amistad, 1993), pp. 330–341.
- Biographical Headnotes for "James Baldwin" and "Toni Morrison" for the D. C. Heath Anthology of American Literature, second rev. ed. (1993), pp. 2614–2615, 2872–2876.
- "Our People, Our People", in Alice Walker and Zora Neale Hurston: The Common Bond, ed. Lillie P. Howard (Greenwood Press, 1993), pp. 31–42.
- "Literature in Kenya" (with James Cornell), in Kenya: The Land, The People, and The Nation, ed. Mario Azevedo (Durham: Carolina Academic Press, 1993), pp. 103–118.
- "African-American Literature: A Survey", in Africana Studies: A Survey of Africa and the African Diaspora, ed. Mario Azevedo (Durham: Carolina Academic Press, 1992), pp. 331–342.
- "Introduction to Alice Childress' 'In the Laundry Room'", in Women's Friendships, ed. Susan Koppelman (Norman: University of Oklahoma Press, 1991), pp. 170–73.
- "Native Sons and Foreign Daughters", in New Essays on Wright's Native Son, ed. Keneth Kinnamon (Cambridge University Press, 1990), pp. 63–84.
- "From Exile to Asylum: Religion and Community in the Writings of Contemporary Black Women", in Women's Writing in Exile, ed. Mary Lynn Broe and Angela Ingram (Chapel Hill: UNC Press, 1989), pp. 151–169.
- "Reconnecting Fragments: Afro-American Folk Tradition in The Bluest Eye", in Critical Essays on Toni Morrison, ed. Nellie Y. McKay (Boston: G. K. Hall, 1988), pp. 68–76.'
- "Introduction" to Alice Childress's Like One of the Family (Boston: Beacon, 1986), pp. xi–xxxviii. ISBN 0807009032
- "Charlotte Forten", in Afro-American Writers Before the Harlem Renaissance (Detroit: Gale Research Company, 1986), pp. 130–139.
- "Black Writers in a Changed Landscape, Since 1950", The History of Southern Literature, eds Louis Rubin, Jr., Blyden Jackson, et al. (Baton Rouge: LSU Press, 1985), pp. 566–577.
- "Samm-Art Williams", in Afro-American Writers After 1955: Dramatists and Prose Writers (Detroit: Gale Research Company, 1985), pp. 283–290.
- "Alice Childress", in Afro-American Writers After 1955: Dramatists and Prose Writers (Detroit: Gale Research Company, 1985), pp. 66–79.
- "The South As Woman: Chimeric Images of Emasculation in Just Above My Head", Studies in Black American Literature. Vol. 1, eds Joe Weixlmann and Chester J. Fontenot (Greenwood, Florida: Penkevill Publishing Company, 1983), pp. 89–109.
- "Three Black Women Writers and Humanism: A Folk Perspective", in Black American Literature and Humanism, ed. R. Baxter Miller (University of Kentucky Press, 1981), pp. 50–74.

=== Articles ===
- "Peace in the War of Desire: Richard Wright's 'Long Black Song'." Forthcoming in CLA Journal.
- "Does Northern Travel Relieve Slavery? 'Vacations' in Dolen Perkins-Valdez's Wench." Forthcoming in The South Atlantic Review.
- "Nikki Giovanni: Literary Survivor Across Centuries", in Appalachian Heritage 40:2 (2012): 34–47.
- "The Terrible Pangs of Compromise: Racial Reconciliation in African American Literature", in The Cresset LXXV No. 4 (2012): 16–27.
- "Protest Poetry", for the National Humanities Center online resources for high school teachers—TeacherServe, Fall 2009.
- "The Image of Africa in the Literature of the Harlem Renaissance", for the National Humanities Center online resources for high school teachers—TeacherServe, Summer 2009.
- "The Trickster in African American Literature", for the National Humanities Center online resources for high school teachers—TeacherServe, Summer 2009.
- "The ‘N-Word’ Versus 'Nigger'", for the National Humanities Center online courses in African American Literature, Spring 2009.
- "Pigmentocracy", for the National Humanities Center online courses for high school teachers, 2008.
- C.S.A (Confederate States of America); article/review in Southern Cultures, Fall 2006.
- "William Melvin Kelley’s Real Live, Invisible South", South Central Review, 22:1 (Spring 2005): 26–47.
- "Porch-Sitting as a Creative Southern Tradition", in Southern Cultures 2:3-4 (1996): 441–460. Reprinted in Voices From Home: The North Carolina Prose Anthology, ed. Richard Krawiec (Greensboro, NC: Avisson Press, Inc., 1997), pp. 320–334.
- "Greeting the New Century with a Different Kind of Magic", Introduction to special issue of Callaloo (19:2) on Emerging Black Women Writers (Spring 1996): 232–238.
- "The Worlds That Toni Morrison Made" for special issue of The Georgia Review, "The Nobel Laureates of Literature: An Olympic Gathering", in connection with the Cultural Olympiad gathering of Nobel Prize winners in Atlanta in April 1995, XLIX (Spring 1995): 324–330.
- "‘This Disease Called Strength’: Some Observations on the Compensating Construction of Black Female Character", Literature and Medicine 14 (Spring 1995): 109–126.
- "Adventures in a ‘Foreign Country’: African American Humor and the South", Southern Humor Issue of Southern Cultures 1:4 (Summer 1995): 457–465. Reprinted in the Fifteenth Anniversary Issue of Southern Cultures (2008).
- "Genre"—for "Keywords" special issue of the Journal of American Folklore, 108 (Fall 1995): 509–527.
- "Toni Morrison: Solo Flight Through Literature and History", World Literature Today 68:1 (Winter 1994): 9–14. Invited commentary on Toni Morrison's works, which accompanied the publication of her Nobel Lecture.
- "‘Africanizing the Audience’: Zora Neale Hurston's Transformation of White Folks in Mules and Men", The Zora Neale Hurston Forum 7:1 (Fall 1993): 43–58.
- "Moms Mabley: A Study in Humor, Role Playing, and the Violation of Taboo", in The Southern Review, 24 (Autumn 1988): 765–776.
- "From Victimization to Free Enterprise: Alice Walker’s The Color Purple", Studies in American Fiction, 14 (Spring 1986): 1–17.
- "On The Color Purple, Stereotypes, and Silence", Black American Literature Forum, 18 (Winter 1984): 155–161. Reprinted in Gale Research's Series, Black Literature Criticism (1991, 1994).
- "The Women of Brewster Place, by Gloria Naylor", review/article, Southern Changes, 6, ii (March/April 1984): 12–13.
- "No Outlet for the Blues: Silla Boyce’s Plight in Brown Girl, Brownstones", Callaloo, 6, ii (Spring-Summer 1983): 57–67.
- "Almost Family, by Roy Hoffman", review/article for Southern Changes, 5, ii (March/April 1983): 21–23.
- "A Different Image of the Black Woman", review/article of Dorothy West's The Living is Easy, Callaloo, 5, iii (October 1982): 146–151.
- "Tiptoeing Through Taboo: Incest in Alice Walker’s ‘The Child Who Favored Daughter’", Modern Fiction Studies, 28, iii (Autumn 1982): 495–505.
- "A Spiritual Journey: Gayl Jones’s Song for Anninho", Callaloo, 5, iii (October 1982): 105–111.
- "From Mammies to Militants: Domestics in Black American Literature", Second Century Radcliffe News (June 1982), p. 9.
- "‘I wish I was a poet’: The Character as Artist in Alice Childress’ Like One of the Family", Black American Literature Forum, 14, i (Special issue on literary theory; Spring 1980): 24–30.
- "Chesnutt's Frank Fowler: A Failure of Purpose?" CLA Journal, 22, iii (March 1979): 215–228.
- "The Barbershop in Black Literature", Black American Literature Forum, 13, iii (Fall 1979): 112–118.
- "The Eye as Weapon in If Beale Street Could Talk", MELUS, 5, iii (Fall 1978): 54–66. Reprinted in Critical Essays on James Baldwin, eds Fred L. Standley and Nancy V. Burt (Boston: G. K. Hall, 1988), pp. 204–216.
- "Telephone Pranks: A Thriving Pastime", Journal of Popular Culture, 12, i (Summer 1978): 138–145.
- "Folklore in the Fiction of Alice Walker—A Perpetuation of Historical and Literary Traditions", Black American Literature Forum, 11, i (Spring 1977): 3–8.
- "Ellison’s 'Peter Wheatstraw': His Basis in Black Folk Tradition", Mississippi Folklore Register, 9, ii (Summer 1975): 117–126.
- "Ceremonial Fagots: Lynching and Burning Rituals in Black American Literature", Southern Humanities Review, 10, iii (Summer 1975): 235–247.
- "Violence in The Third Life of Grange Copeland", CLA Journal, 19, ii (December: 238–247.
