= John Murray (novelist) =

English writer and novelist

- Born: 1950 (age 75–76); Flimby, Cumberland, England
- Occupations: novelist, short story writer
- Writing career
- Period: 1985–present
- Genres: Comedy, Satire, Spiritual thriller

John Murray (born 1950, Flimby, Cumberland) is an English writer and novelist known for writing satirical novels on a range of subjects. He read Sanskrit at University College, Oxford.

In 1984 he founded the fiction magazine Panurge, which he edited with fellow author David Almond until 1996. Panurge Publishing published Julia Darling's debut collection of short stories, Bloodlines in 1995.

Murray's first novel, Samarkand, was published in 1985 (it was broadcast on BBC Radio 3)) and in 1988 he received the Dylan Thomas Award for 2 stories out of his collection, Pleasure. In 2002 his novel John Dory won a Lakeland Book of the Year Award, and his book Jazz Etc was longlisted for the Man Booker Prize in 2003. His 2004 novel, Murphy's Favourite Channels, was a "Novel of the Week" in The Daily Telegraph. He has also published several other critically acclaimed novels including, Kin, Reiver Blues, Radio Activity, The Legend of Liz and Joe and A Gentleman's Relish. His latest novel The Lawless Book of Love (2018) is a satire on online dating and is available as a Kindle eBook.

Murray currently lives in London where he teaches Creative Writing courses (www.writinginkythnos.com). He has been a regular fiction tutor at The Arvon Foundation since 1989 and every summer from 1995 to 2007 he led a creative writing workshop at Madingley Hall, Cambridge.

Murray also writes a blog, Wild Days in Greece (johnmurraywritinginkythnos.wordpress.com), which he started when he moved to live on the Greek island of Kythnos in 2013. The blog has nearly 500 posts and covers a massive range of subjects, including London, Greece, films, books, TV series, music, recipes and politics. It also features Murray's latest short stories and a 2016 novel Passion For Beginners.

He married Annie Murray (née Clements) in 1979, a consultant trainer and specialist in Organisational Transactional Analysis, who died in 2009. He has one daughter Ione, born 1989, a computer programmer who lives in West Yorkshire.
