= Today Will Be Different =

2016 novel by Maria Semple

- First edition
- Author: Maria Semple
- Language: English
- Publisher: Little, Brown and Company
- Publication date: October 4, 2016
- Publication place: United States
- Media type: Print (hardback and paperback), e-book, audiobook
- Pages: 336
- ISBN: 9780316403436
- OCLC: 935195821

Today Will Be Different is a comedy novel by Maria Semple. It was first published on October 4, 2016 by Little, Brown and Company. The novel follows a day in the life of Eleanor Flood. A television adaptation of the novel, also written by Semple and starring Julia Roberts, is being developed for HBO.

== Synopsis ==
The entire book takes place in a single day in Eleanor Flood's life. Eleanor is a beleaguered woman living in Seattle with her husband Joe, a renowned hand surgeon, and her son Timby, a third-grader at the Galer Street School that was first introduced in Maria Semple's preceding novel Where'd You Go, Bernadette. At the start of the book, Eleanor decides to improve herself by adopting the mantra that "today will be different" and setting attainable goals for the day. However, things do not go according to plan in Eleanor's day, and she finds herself having to deal with a missing husband, a sick son and a mystery lunch date.

== Reception ==
The novel was well received. The Los Angeles Times' Maris Kreizman described the novel as "truly smart and deep and funny — worthy of laughing out loud rather than merely saying LOL." Comparing Today Will Be Different with Semple's previous novel Where'd You Go, Bernadette, The New York Times' Janet Maslin noted that: "it cuts closer to the bone than Bernadette did, and its main character's problems feel more real. This time Ms. Semple delivers less satire and more soul."

The Guardian's Suzi Feay commended the book's narrative voice and "memorable, monstrous" characters. Also writing for The Guardian, Lucy Scholes noted that "nobody depicts [white-people problems] better, with tongue-in-cheek humour and genuine warmth".

Isabella Biedenharn of Entertainment Weekly gave the novel a "B+" grade, concluding that: "Today's tone veers wildly from satire to tragedy, but Semple is such a deft observer of human foibles that she glues it all together with wit and glitter — a master fabulist, just like Eleanor." Writing for USA Today, Steph Cha gave the book three stars out of four, noting that it is "unrelentingly entertaining" despite being "a bit messy".
