= Lara Love Hardin =

American literary agent

- Born: Massachusetts
- Education: University of California, Santa Cruz (B.A.); University of California, Irvine (MFA)
- Occupation: Writer
- Children: 4
- Website: www.laralovehardin.com

Lara Love Hardin is an American literary agent, author, prison reform advocate, and president of True Literary Agency. Her memoir, The Many Lives of Mama Love: A Memoir of Lying, Stealing, Writing, and Healing (2023), is a 2024 Oprah's Book Club pick and a New York Times bestseller.

In 2008, Love Hardin was arrested and charged with multiple counts of identity theft. At the time of her arrest, she was addicted to heroin. Love Hardin faced 27 years in prison. She entered into a plea deal that saw her spend ten months in county jail. At the time of her arrest, Love Hardin and her then-husband were described in the Santa Cruz Sentinel as "the neighbors from hell". After her release from jail, she found a job at a literary agency.

Apart from her memoir, she is also a five-time New York Times bestselling collaborative writer, including the #1 New York Times bestseller Designing Your Life, and 2018 Oprah's Book Club pick, The Sun Does Shine, which she co-authored with Anthony Ray Hinton about his 30 years as an innocent man on Alabama's death row. In 2019, she won a Christopher Award for her work "affirming the highest values of the human spirit." Her work has been nominated for an NAACP Image Award and short-listed for the Dayton Literary Peace Prize. Love Hardin is also the co-founder of The Gemma Project, an organization serving incarcerated and formerly incarcerated women.
