= Maria Semple =

American novelist and screenwriter (born 1964)

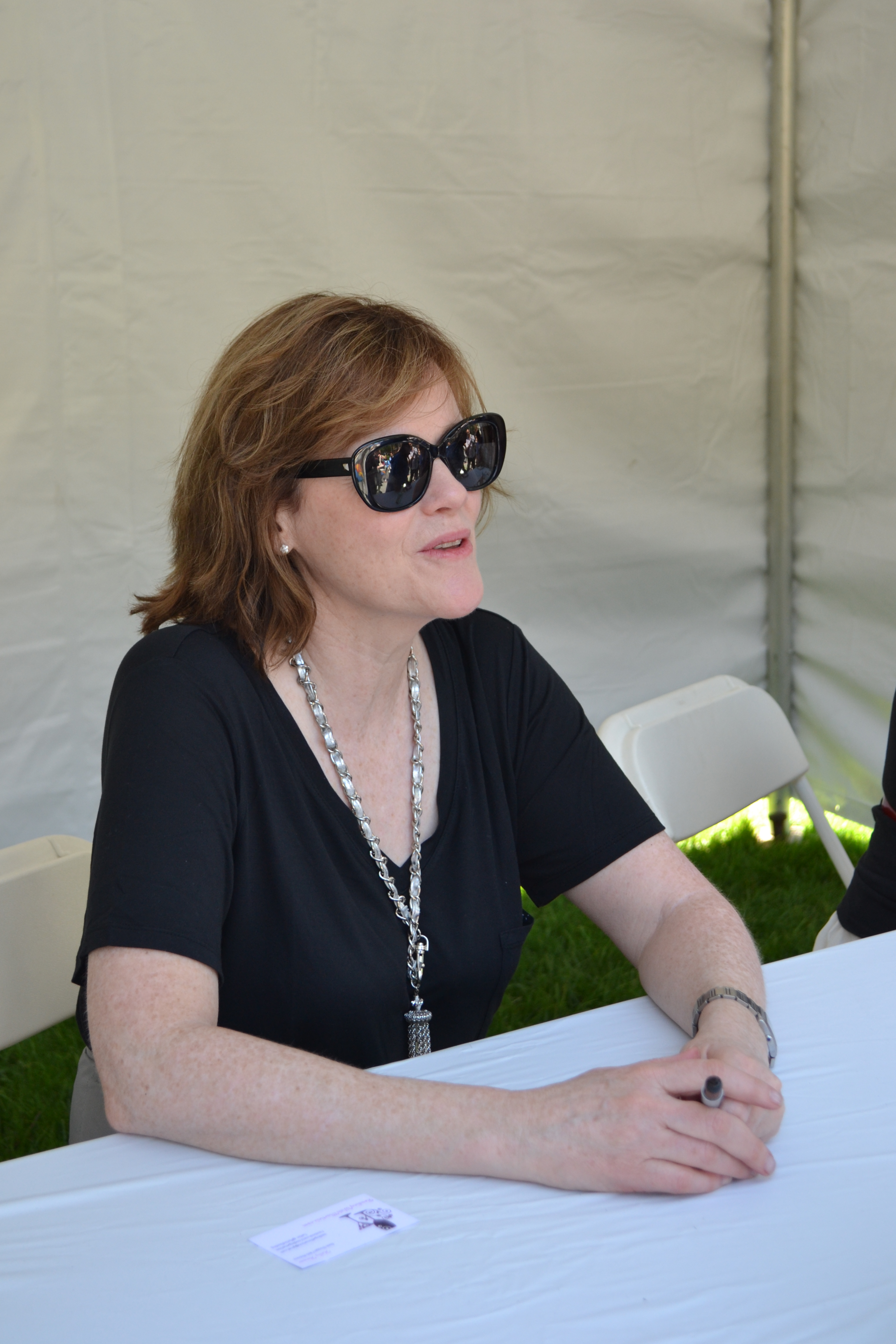
- Semple in 2013
- Born: Maria Keogh Semple; May 21, 1964 (age 62); Santa Monica, California, U.S.
- Education: Barnard College (BA)
- Occupations: Writer; producer
- Years active: 1992–present
- Partner: George Meyer
- Children: 1
- Father: Lorenzo Semple Jr.

Maria Keogh Semple (born May 21, 1964) is an American novelist and screenwriter. She is the author of This One Is Mine (2008), Where'd You Go, Bernadette (2012), and Today Will Be Different (2016). Her television credits include Beverly Hills, 90210, Mad About You, Saturday Night Live, Arrested Development, Suddenly Susan, and Ellen. She is a 2013 recipient of the Alex Awards.

== Early life ==
Semple was born in Santa Monica, California. Her family moved to Spain soon after she was born. There her father, the screenwriter Lorenzo Semple, Jr., wrote the pilot for the television series Batman. The family moved to Los Angeles and then to Aspen, Colorado. Semple attended boarding school at Choate Rosemary Hall, then received a BA in English from Barnard College in 1986.

== Career ==
Semple's first screenwriting job was in 1992, for the television show Beverly Hills, 90210. She was nominated for a Primetime Emmy, Outstanding Television Series, in 1997 for Mad About You. In 2006 and 2007, she was nominated for a Writers Guild of America award, for Arrested Development. This One is Mine was a finalist for the 2010 Pacific Northwest Booksellers Association Award. She appeared in the 2004 David O. Russell film I Heart Huckabees. She is active in the Seattle literary community, and is a founding member of Seattle 7 Writers. Her writing has appeared in the magazine The New Yorker. She has also taught fiction writing at the Richard Hugo House.

== Novels ==
Semple's novels include This One is Mine (2008), Where'd You Go, Bernadette (2012), and Today Will Be Different (2016), all published by Little, Brown and Company.

This One is Mine is about a woman who has it all, a loving family and wealth; however, her unhappiness leads her to make dangerous decisions in the pursuit of "more."

Where'd You Go, Bernadette is about an agoraphobic architect, mother, and wife who is struggling to adjust to life in Seattle and goes missing just before a family trip to Antarctica. Where'd You Go, Bernadette spent a year on the New York Times bestseller list, won the American Library Association's Alex Award, and was shortlisted for the Women's Prize for Fiction. In 2013, Annapurna Pictures and Color Force acquired the rights. Cate Blanchett starred in the film adaptation, directed by Richard Linklater, which was released on August 16, 2019.

Today Will Be Different takes place over the course of a single day and tells the story of a woman who starts the day determined to be her best self.

In 2026, G.P. Putnam's Sons and Weidenfeld & Nicolson published Semple's fourth novel, Go Gentle, about a Stoic philosopher in New York City. Go Gentle was selected by Oprah Winfrey as an Oprah's Book Club pick.

== Personal life ==
Semple is in a relationship with producer and writer George Meyer and has one daughter with him, Poppy. They reside in Seattle. In 2007, a newly discovered species of moss frogs from Sri Lanka was named Philautus poppiae after their daughter, a tribute to Meyer's and Semple's dedication to the Global Amphibian Assessment.
