= Pájaro verde =

Alcoholic beverage

- Origin: Chile
- Introduced: 19th century
- Ingredients: paint thinner, paint, turpentine, varnish, cola

The Pájaro verde (lit. Green Bird) is a highly toxic alcoholic beverage (due to the presence of chemicals such as thinners, paint or turpentine) produced clandestinely and illegally inside Chilean prisons. The drink was reported by the Chilean press after a series of scandals in which prisoners died from its consumption.

According to some scholars, within the prison culture this drink has a ritualistic character. It originated in the Chilean prisons of the 19th century; the practice has been preserved over time through oral tradition.

== Preparation ==
Its ingredients have varied throughout history and part of the prison rite is to prepare it with the available resources. Today, the most common way is to ferment a mixture of sugar, rice, rotten and fresh fruits and their peels; a strong chemical is added to this liquid, such as turpentine, paint thinners, paint or varnish to give it a "greater neural shock". There have been cases where excrement has even been used in the fermentation process.

The result is a distillate with a high degree of methanol, which is toxic to humans – unlike ethanol, which is found in common alcoholic beverages. It is sometimes mixed with a cola drink to "enhance the taste". Lemon juice is usually added to the final mixture (usually in the same container from which it is drunk) as there is a belief that this citrus counteracts the toxic effects of the chemicals that make up the drink.

== Toxicity ==
Given the tremendously harmful nature of the main ingredients, there have been many convicts who have been seriously intoxicated, even reaching the point of death.

In July 2006, in the Rancagua Prison, one convict died, another was left brain dead and five were seriously damaged in the trachea after drinking a mixture of thinner with Coca-Cola in an attempt to emulate this drink. The case of the Valparaíso Penitentiary is also known, where an inmate died in the Carlos van Buren hospital after drinking Pájaro verde, which caused a seizure at the prison.

== Current situation ==
Today the deadly drink continues to exist in Chilean prisons, although to a much lesser degree and with less toxic variations, such as chicha prepared in the same way but without diluents, which are replaced by medicinal alcohol. This chicha, which is considered heir to the green bird, is usually consumed together with clonazepam —an anxiolytic known as the prison drug— and less frequently with cocaine, marijuana or cocaine paste.

== See also ==
- Spanish Methanol Poisonings
- Pruno
