= Wild (memoir) =

Book by Cheryl Strayed

Wild: From Lost to Found on the Pacific Crest Trail
- Author: Cheryl Strayed
- Language: English
- Genres: Memoir; Addiction memoir; grief memoir; adventure; self help; coming of age
- Publisher: Knopf
- Publication date: March 20, 2012
- Publication place: United States
- Media type: Hardcover, Kindle Edition, Audio CD, Audible Audio
- Pages: 336 pages (hardcover)
- ISBN: 978-0307592736

Wild: From Lost to Found on the Pacific Crest Trail is the 2012 memoir by the American writer, author, and podcaster Cheryl Strayed. The memoir describes Strayed's 1,100-mile (1,800 km) hike on the Pacific Crest Trail in 1995 as a journey of self-discovery. The book reached No. 1 on the New York Times Best Seller list and was the first selection for Oprah's Book Club 2.0.

A film adaptation was released in December 2014, starring Reese Witherspoon as Strayed.

== Plot ==
Strayed's solo hike along the Pacific Crest Trail begins in the Mojave Desert. She hikes through California and Oregon to the Bridge of the Gods into Washington. The book also contains flashbacks to prior life occurrences that led Strayed to begin her journey.

At age 22, Strayed had been devastated by the lung cancer death of her mother, who was only 45 years old. Her stepfather disengaged from the family, and her brother and sister remained distant. Strayed abandoned her kind, loving husband and took up with a heroin user, becoming one herself.

Four years later, seeking self-discovery and resolution of her enduring grief and personal challenges, she began her trek, with no prior hiking experience. Wild intertwines the stories of Strayed's life before and during the journey, describing her physical challenges, emotional, and spiritual realizations while on the trail.

== Distinctions and recognition ==
- May 30, 2012: Oprah Winfrey announced the launch of Oprah's Book Club 2.0 with Wild as its first selection.
- July 15, 2012: Wild reached No. 1 on The New York Times Best Seller list.
- December 3, 2012: Wild was named No. 6 best non-fiction book of 2012 by The Christian Science Monitor.
- December 4, 2012: Wild was voted No. 1 book of 2012 in the "Memoir and Autobiography" category in the "Goodreads Choice Awards 2012."
- January 2013: Wild was selected as Book of the Week on BBC Radio 4, where a five-episode abridgement of the book was read.
- 2013: Wild spent 52 weeks on the NPR Hardcover Nonfiction Bestseller List.
- April 2013: For Wild, Strayed received the Reader's Choice Award in the 2013 Oregon Book Awards.
- As of August 2015: Wild has been translated into 30 languages.

== Film ==
By the time the book was published, actress Reese Witherspoon's film company Hello Sunshine had optioned Wild for film rights. Witherspoon portrayed Strayed in the 2014 film Wild, which was written by the novelist Nick Hornby and directed by Jean-Marc Vallée.

== Reception ==
In The New York Times, Dwight Garner wrote that "the lack of ease in (Strayed's) life made her fierce and funny; she hammers home her hard-won sentences like a box of nails," adding that the memoir reflected a "too infrequent sight: that of a writer finding her voice, and sustaining it, right in front of your eyes."

In The New York Times, Dani Shapiro called the book "spectacular... at once a breathtaking adventure tale and a profound meditation on the nature of grief and survival, ... both a literary and human triumph." Shapiro wrote that unlike many parallel-arc stories, Strayed's two parallel narratives—the challenging hike itself and the difficult life events that preceded it—are delivered in perfect balance. According to Shapiro, the memoir did not overdramatize its events, but followed a "powerful, yet understated, imperative to understand (their) meaning," allowing readers "to feel how her actions and her internal struggles intertwine, and appreciate the lessons she finds embedded in the natural world."

In Slate, Melanie Rehak began by contrasting Wild with the 2006 memoir Eat, Pray, Love—whose story was "pleasant, mild, romantic, and completely lacking urgency" and in which everything would work out. In contrast, Wild was said to be "crammed with... passages of vicious discomfort" and was carried by a voice that was "fierce, billowing with energy, precise." Crediting the years that passed between Strayed's 1995 hike and her 2012 memoir, Rehak wrote that Strayed had "fine control" over "unfathomable, enormous experiences" and never wrote "from a place of desperation in the kind of semi-edited purge state that has marred so many true stories."

By the time of the film Wild's release, in December 2014 A.O. Scott wrote in The New York Times that Strayed's memoir was "already a classic of wilderness writing and modern feminism." In 2019, Anna Leahy wrote in the Los Angeles Review of Books that Wild was likely the most popular memoir approaching the subject of cancer from the perspectives of loved ones and caregivers.
