= Yvonne Wells =

American quiltmaker (born 1939)

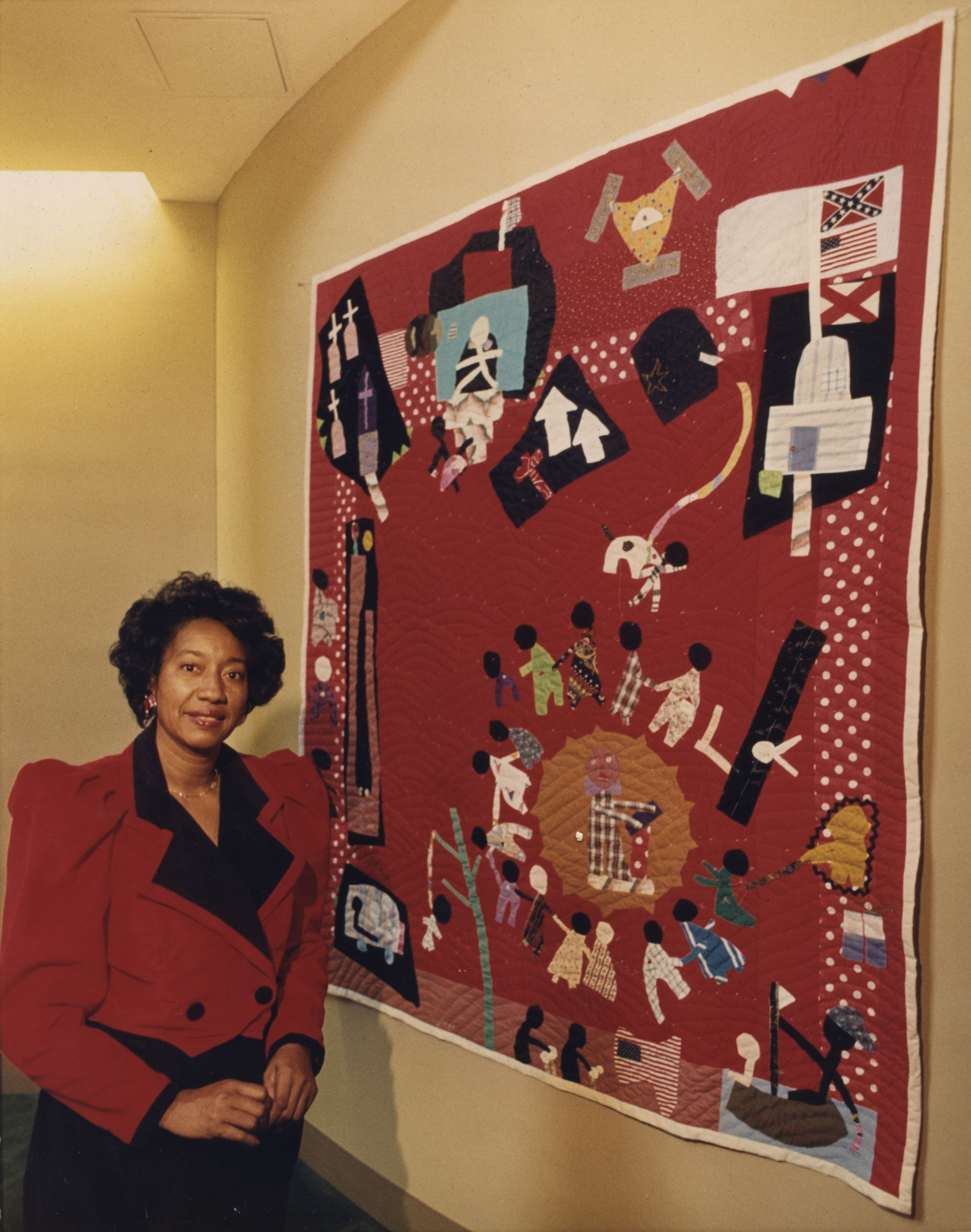
- Yvonne Wells with her quilt Yesterday: Civil Rights in the South III (1989) at the first Realizing the Dream concert in Tuscaloosa, AL on January 13, 1990.
- Born: December 26, 1939 (age 86); Tuscaloosa, Alabama, U.S.
- Education: Stillman College
- Occupations: Quiltmaker; Folk Artist
- Years active: 1979–present

Yvonne Wells (born December 26, 1939, Tuscaloosa, Alabama) is an African-American folk artist and quilter from Tuscaloosa, Alabama. She is best known for her self-taught style and her story quilts depicting scenes from the Bible and the Civil Rights Movement. Her work has been exhibited at the Smithsonian National Museum of African American History and Culture and at the International Quilt Museum.

== Early life ==
Wells's mother was an elementary school teacher, and her father was a Presbyterian minister. As a child, she played sports competitively, including on a traveling softball team. Wells was one of nine children. Both her parents died before Wells had completed her bachelor's degree at Stillman College, where she studied Physical Education. Her siblings also studied at Stillman.

After college, Wells worked as a physical education instructor at Druid High School in Tuscaloosa, her alma mater, until in 1970 she was hired to teach at Tuscaloosa High School, where she experienced firsthand the struggles of school integration in Alabama. In 2009, recalling the civil rights era, she told an interviewer that “During that time it was the most tense time that I have ever experienced between the races. You could just almost cut it."

Wells retired from teaching in 2000.

== Arts career ==
Despite coming from a region renowned for African-American quilters like Mozell Benson, Nora Ezell, and the quilter's cooperative in Gee's Bend, Wells did not grow up in a tradition of quilting and did not began her craft until middle age. She made her first quilt in 1979.

A self-taught artist, Wells describes her process as born originally from a utilitarian desire for a warm garment, which spurred a long artistic career making more creative quilts. In 2010, Wells told American Studies professor Stacy Morgan, "[W]hen I first got started I was piecing—my kind of piecing. There was no pattern. It was just fabric, or curtains, or clothes, or socks, or anything that I was using at the onset." In 2011, Wells said that she had begun using a quilting frame, but that most of her work still took place sitting on the floor.

In the mid-1980s, Wells began creating her signature "story" and "picture" quilts, incorporating a diverse range of found materials and sewing mostly by hand. Her 1986 quilt, "Crucifixion", which depicts the biblical scene, is the first example of a story quilt in her oeuvre. At her most prolific, Wells has said she produced "about twenty quilts a month," even while teaching full time.

The first exhibition of Wells's quilts was in 1985, at the Kentuck Art Festival in Northport, Alabama, after her agent, a Tuscaloosa folk art dealer named Robert Cargo, convinced her to show her work in public. That year, her quilts were awarded Best in Show, an award she went on to receive at the festival again in 1990, 1991, 1995, 1997, and 2004.

One of Wells's first exhibitions outside of Alabama was in the 1989 traveling quilt exhibit "Stitching Memories: African-American Story Quilts," shown, among other places, at Williams College of Art in Massachusetts. Since then, Wells has exhibited quilts in galleries and museums including the Smithsonian National Museum of African American History and Culture, the International Quilt Museum, and the Flint African American Quilters Guild. Wells's quilts have also appeared on Hallmark cards, and in 1993 she was invited to design an ornament for the White House Christmas Tree.

In an interview, Wells said, "My work is not traditional. I like it that way. If people tell me to turn my ends under, I'll leave them raggedy. If they tell me to make my stitches small and tight. I'll leave them loose. Sometimes you can trip over my stitches they're so big. You can always recognize the traditional quilters who come by and see my quilts. They sort of cringe.”

Wells has received the 1998 Alabama Arts and Visual Craftsmen award and the 2019 Governor's Arts Award from the Alabama State Council on the Arts., Her work is held in the permanent collections of the Montgomery Museum of Fine Art, The Birmingham Museum of Art, the Kentuck Arts Center, the National Museum of African American History, and the International Quilt Museum.

In 2018 and 2019, Wells served as Creative Director for the Tuscaloosa 200 Bicentennial Project, where she oversaw the creation of a collaborative quilt commemorating the occasion.

New York Times art critic Martha Schwendener called Wells's 1989 quilt "Yesterday: Civil Rights in the South III" an "epic quilt that shows the Mayflower arriving in North America, with a black man rowing a white man ashore." Schwendener compared Wells's quilting practice to that of Harriet Powers, a 19th-century slave in Georgia who made quilts that told stories from the Bible. In 2024, Wells and her work were the subject of the book and catalogue raisonné The Story Quilts of Yvonne Wells.

== Noted works ==
- Being in Total Control of Herself. Quilt, 1990.
- Elvis. Quilt featuring portrait of Elvis Presley, 1991.
- Noah's Ark. Applique Quilt, 1988.
- Yesterday: Civil Rights in the South, I and III. Quilts, 1989. Cotton, cotton/polyester blend, wool, polyester, and plastic buttons.,

== Selected exhibitions ==
- Quilts: The Patterns of History at the Castle Gallery at New Rochelle College, New York, February — April 1991.
- Narrations: The Quilts of Yvonne Wells and Carolyn Mazloomi at the Louisville Visual Art Association, February and March, 1992.
- Alabama Art 2000 at the Montgomery Museum of Fine Arts in Montgomery, Alabama and the N.A.L.L. Art Association in Vence, France, May — September 2000.
- African American Quilts from the Robert & Helen Cargo Collection at the Textile Museum, Washington, DC, 3 October 2003 — 29 February 2004.
- Black History Month Exhibit at the Gadsden Museum of Art in Gadsden, Alabama, January — February 2011.
- Yvonne Wells: Quilted Messages at the International Quilt Museum in Lincoln, Nebraska, 7 October 2011 — 26 February 2012.
- African American Quilters Guild Exhibit at the Flint, Michigan Public Library, 13 — 15 September 2012.
- Telling Stories: Quilted Art by Yvonne Wells at the Carnegie Visual Arts Center in Decatur, Alabama, 10 April — 26 May 2012.
- Piecing Together History: Civil Rights Quilts by Yvonne Wells at the Montgomery Museum of Fine Arts in Montgomery, Alabama, 27 July — 25 August 2013.
- From Heart to Hand: African-American Quilts from the Montgomery Museum of Fine Arts, traveling exhibit, September 2012 — January 2014.
- The Original Makers: Folk Art from the Cargo Collection at the Birmingham Museum of Art in Birmingham, Alabama, 16 June — 30 December 2018.
- Pieces and Patterns: Quilts of West Alabama at the Montgomery Museum of Fine Art in Montgomery, Alabama, 13 February — 1 April 2020.

== Book ==
Stacy I. Morgan and Yvonne Thomas Wells, The Story Quilts of Yvonne Wells (Tuscaloosa: University of Alabama Press, 2024).
