= The Twelve Tribes of Hattie =

Novel by Ayana Mathis

- Author: Ayana Mathis
- Genre: Fiction
- Publisher: Alfred A. Knopf
- Publication date: 2012
- Pages: 243 pp.
- ISBN: 978-0-385-35028-0
- OCLC: 769990363

The Twelve Tribes of Hattie is the 2012 debut novel of American author Ayana Mathis. In December 2012, the novel was selected for Oprah's Book Club 2.0. The Twelve Tribes of Hattie revolves around the matriarch of a black family of the Great Migration and her children and grandchildren.
