= Honorée Fanonne Jeffers =

American poet and novelist (born 1967)

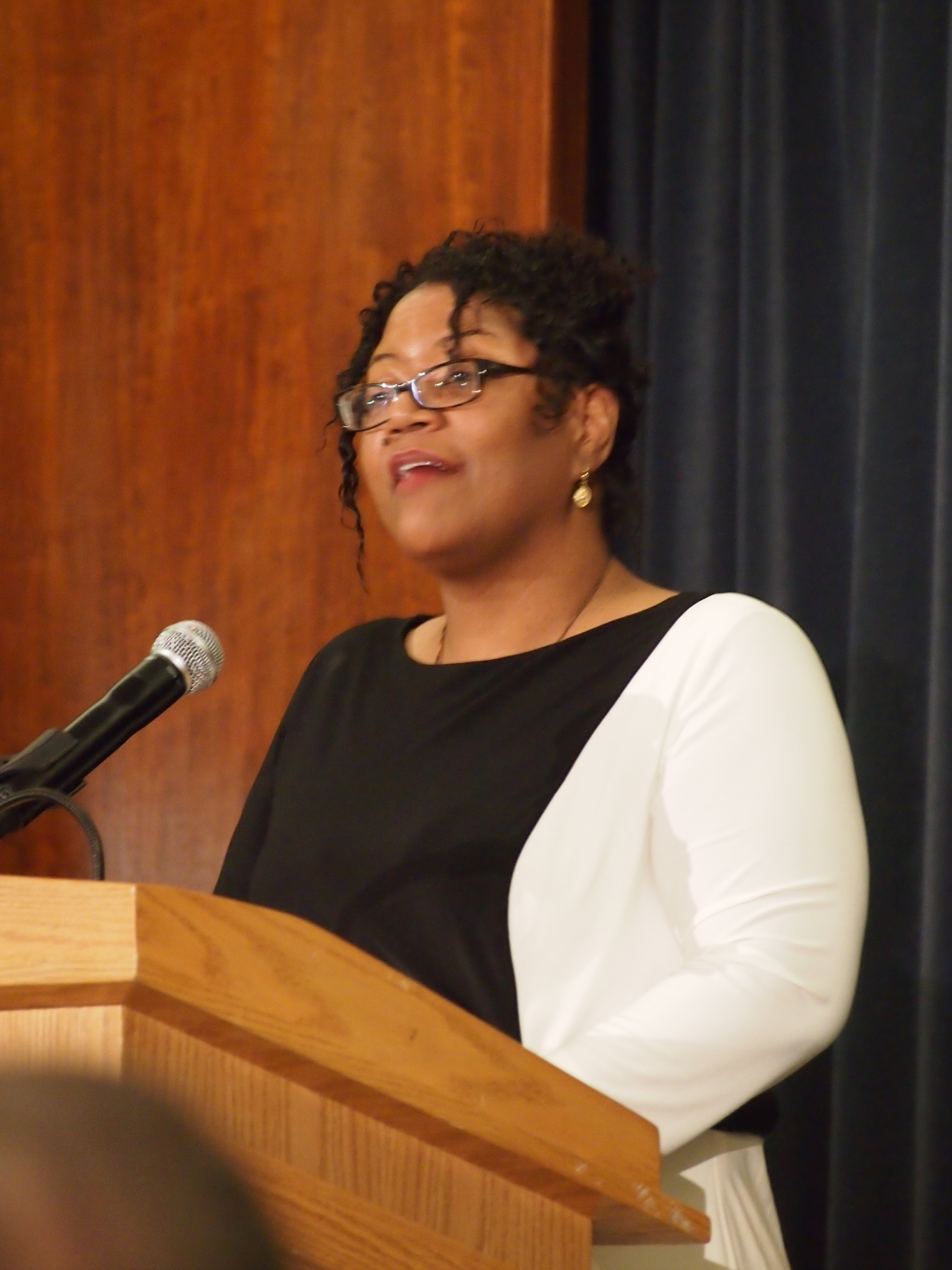
- Jeffers in 2014
- Born: 1967 (age 58–59); Kokomo, Indiana, United States
- Education: Talladega College; University of Alabama
- Occupations: Poet; novelist; academic
- Employer: University of Oklahoma
- Notable work: The Age of Phillis (2020); The Love Songs of W.E.B. Du Bois (2021)
- Awards: NAACP Image Award for Outstanding Literary Work – Poetry (2021)
- Website: honoreejeffers.com

Honorée Fanonne Jeffers (born 1967) is an American poet and novelist, and a professor of English at the University of Oklahoma. She has published five collections of poetry and a novel. Her 2020 collection The Age of Phillis reexamines the life of American poet Phillis Wheatley, based on years of archival research; it was longlisted for the 2020 National Book Award for Poetry, and won the 2021 NAACP Image Award for Outstanding Literary Work – Poetry. Her debut novel, The Love Songs of W.E.B. Du Bois, was published by HarperCollins in 2021.

== Biography ==
Jeffers was born in Kokomo, Indiana, and raised Catholic in Durham, North Carolina, and Atlanta, Georgia. Her mother's family is from Eatonton, Georgia; her father's family, she recounted, was "black bourgeois and fair skinned" (her father, Lance Jeffers, was also a poet), and they were not happy when he married a working-class, darker-skinned woman. Jeffers wrote about her family background in Red Clay Suite (2007), and said in an interview: "The only families I have known are my mother's folk, and my mother's parents were sharecroppers. So I write about her family's land and what this land means to me".

Jeffers graduated from Talladega College in 1996, and then got an MFA from the University of Alabama. In a 2004 interview with Callaloo journal, she recalled being the only Black poet in her creative writing program, and both standing on the shoulders of the Black Arts Movement (BAM) and moving away from it, for instance in the BAM's lack of acceptance of homosexuality. Comparing the more radical poetry she wrote while at Alabama with her later work, Jeffers said that she had "discovered a need to represent subtlety and emotional interrogation". She is a full professor at the University of Oklahoma, where she teaches creative writing.

She has published in literary journals, including Ploughshares, Georgetown Review, Callaloo, The Iowa Review, Oxford American, Prairie Schooner, and Poetry, and her work has been anthologized by poets/editors such as Cornelius Eady, Toi Derricotte, and Jesmyn Ward.

== The Age of Phillis ==
=== Background ===
The life of Phillis Wheatley, the 18th-century American poet, is known mostly through the biographical sketch written by Margaretta Matilda Odell, a White woman, some fifty years after Wheatley's death in 1784. Odell claimed to have been related to the Wheatley family that had enslaved Phillis Wheatley (who soon after manumission and marriage to a John Peters changed her name to Phillis Peters). Scholars have noted how Odell's account "reads like a sentimental novel", erases the trauma of kidnapping and the Middle Passage, and all but wipes away the fact that the Wheatley family enslaved Phillis and others. Instead, it portrays Susanna Wheatley as a benevolent Christian who saves Phillis, and John Peters as a sexually threatening Black man who seduces Phillis and then leaves her financially ruined.

Jeffers was granted the 2009 Robert and Charlotte Baron Fellowship from the American Antiquarian Society to support the research and writing of The Age of Phillis, which was published by Wesleyan University Press in 2020. Jeffers spent 15 years working on the book, and said: "I feel like Ms. Phillis chose me."

=== "Critical fabulation" ===
Odell's is the accepted narrative that Jeffers corrects in her book; she "fills in the gaps". For instance, Jeffers discovered that Peters may not have abandoned his wife, that Odell may have misrepresented the relationship, and that there is no evidence that Odell was related to the Wheatley family. The main text of Jeffers' book is a collection of poetry that rereads and rewrites Wheatley's life, combining creative fiction with historical research (or "critical fabulation", in the words of Saidiya Hartman). For instance, Wheatley was known to have written a second volume of poems, which was never published; Jeffers came across a letter that showed that Peters tried to get that volume printed, indicating that rather than seduction and abandonment, Wheatley and Peters may have simply been in love: "I think it's logical to assume that many, many black folks fell in love with many, many other black folks....This assumption is a rational consequence of acknowledging our black humanity."

Jeffers' poems fill in the gaps left by Odell's biography; she includes love letters between Phillis and Peters, reimagines her life before she was kidnapped and enslaved, offers a more complex picture of her relationship with the Wheatleys, and provides commentary on other issues. For instance, Jeffers offers a first draft of a letter accompanying Wheatley's famous "To His Excellency, George Washington", which "gives vent to her exasperation with flattering white egos" but then strikes through some phrases:

Sir, I have taken the freedom ~~which if~~
~~my master hadn't given me would have~~
~~been my own anyway~~ to address your
Excellency ~~who I heard behaves like~~
~~either a gentlemen or a tyrant~~
~~depending on his moods or his money~~

=== Awards ===
The Age of Phillis was longlisted for the 2020 National Book Award for Poetry. The book was also nominated for the 2021 NAACP Image Award for Outstanding Literary Work – Poetry, and won.

== The Love Songs of W.E.B. Du Bois ==
Jeffers' first novel, The Love Songs of W.E.B. Du Bois, was published to critical acclaim in August 2021. Oprah Winfrey announced on CBS This Morning that it was her new selection for Oprah's Book Club. The book was a finalist for the 2021 Kirkus Prize for Fiction. The novel was also longlisted for the 2021 National Book Award for Fiction. Reviewing the novel in The Guardian, Kadish Morris wrote: "This book is mammoth in size and scope and, though at times it overspills with a surplus of details, is exceptional in the way it engages so deeply and emphatically with history."

== Awards and honors ==
=== Honors ===
Jeffers received the Harper Lee Award for Literary Distinction in 2018, and was inducted into the Alabama Writers Hall of Fame in 2020. Her work on Phillis Wheatley was recognized by the American Antiquarian Society, which inducted her into their organization. Jeffers became a United States Artists fellow, with a $50,000 stipend.

== Bibliography ==
=== Poetry ===
- The Gospel of Barbecue (Kent State University Press, 2000)
- Outlandish Blues (Wesleyan University Press, 2003)
- Red Clay Suite (Southern Illinois University Press, 2007)
- The Glory Gets (Wesleyan University Press, 2015)
- The Age of Phillis (Wesleyan University Press, 2020)

=== Novels ===
- The Love Songs of W.E.B. Du Bois (Harper, 2021) (Note: Briefly reviewed in The New Yorker, September 13, 2021.)

=== Nonfiction/Memoir ===
- Misbehaving at the Crossroads (Harper, 2025)
