= Silver Sparrow =

2011 novel

- First edition cover
- Author: Tayari Jones
- Publisher: Algonquin Books
- Publication date: May 24, 2011
- ISBN: 978-1-56512-990-0

Silver Sparrow is the third novel by the American author Tayari Jones, which was first published in 2011 by Algonquin Books. The novel follows the complicated relationship between two families, joined by a bigamist father. Jones was inspired to write the book by her own relationship with her sisters who were over a decade older than her and who she felt lived very different lives than her own. In 2019, the writer and actress Issa Rae announced plans to adapt the novel into a film.

== Plot ==
Dana Lynn Yarboro's parents meet in Atlanta, Georgia when her father is buying an anniversary present for his wife. Her mother, a young divorcée named Gwen Yarboro, becomes James Witherspoon's mistress. Dana is born shortly before the birth of James's daughter Chaurisse, from his marriage to his wife Laverne. After Chaurisse's birth, Gwen pressures James to illegally marry her which he consents to though he does not leave Laverne.

Dana grows up with the knowledge that her father is married to another woman and has another daughter. Dana and her mother are kept secret, however the only individual from James's other life that is aware of the situation is his childhood friend and adopted brother, Raleigh. Dana is prevented from participating in certain jobs and going to certain schools in order to protect Chaurisse, however while attending a high school science competition she runs into Chaurisse who she notices is wearing the exact same fur jacket as her, both presents given to them by their father, James.

While still a teenager, Dana becomes involved with a young adult man, Marcus McCready, and while her father is displeased he does nothing to stop her as he knows McCready from his married life.

In her final year of high school Dana is introduced to her paternal grandmother, Bunny Witherspoon, as she is dying. Her grandmother bequeaths her her favourite brooch as a parting gift.

Bunny Chaurisse Witherspoon grows up the protected and beloved daughter of James Witherspoon and Laverne Witherspoon. Her parents met at the age of 14 when her mother lost her virginity to her father and subsequently became pregnant and was forced to marry James and leave school. Their son was a stillborn but Laverne remained with the Witherspoons. They managed to claw their way to being middle-class business owners with James and his brother Raleigh running a chauffeur business and Laverne running a beauty salon out of their garage.

While out shopping Chaurisse meets a young girl and saves both of them from being caught shoplifting. The girl is named Dana, and Chaurisse grows infatuated with her believing she is a "silver" girl who is beautiful and leads a charmed life. The two become friends with the shy Dana eventually meeting and befriending Laverne as well.

When the girls are seventeen they go to a party together but the tire on their car blows before they are able to make it. Chaurisse calls her father and Raleigh for help and is confused when Dana subsequently panics and calls her own mother before locking herself in a gas station bathroom. When James arrives, Chaurisse is shocked that he insists on leaving her friend behind. However, Gwen arrives before they can leave and is infuriated that James intended to leave their daughter alone. Gwen and Dana subsequently visit Laverne's beauty parlour where she presents her marriage certificate and also presents Bunny's brooch as proof that James is Dana's father. Laverne throws James out of their home and falls into a depression. However, after two weeks James and Laverne reconcile.

Some fifteen years later Dana has a daughter. Though, she does not marry her daughter's father he publicly claims his daughter as his own which Dana considers progress. She is visited by Chaurisse who asks Dana if James continued to see her and her mother after reconciling with Laverne. Dana reveals that after reuniting with Laverne she only saw James briefly at his vow renewal to Laverne. At this point, James told her she had finally achieved what she wanted: recognition of her paternity at the cost of her private relationship with him. She understands that nevertheless Laverne and Chaurisse have never been able to believe that they have won.

== Reception ==
Silver Sparrow was well received by critics. According to Kirkus Reviews, "Jones beautifully evokes Atlanta in the 1980s while creating gritty, imperfect characters whose pain lingers in the reader’s heart." The Washington Post described Jones's writing as "realistic and sparkling". The Chicago Tribune praised the novel as "an exciting read all the way through." The Guardian called the book "as moving, intimate and wise as An American Marriage on the topics of marriage, family and womanhood, and deserves similar acclaim." However, Publishers Weekly criticized the novel as "growing increasingly histrionic and less believable" as it went on.
