= The Love Songs of W.E.B. Du Bois =

2021 novel by Honorée Fanonne Jeffers

- First edition
- Author: Honorée Fanonne Jeffers
- Language: English
- Genre: Novel
- Publisher: HarperCollins
- Publication date: 2021
- Publication place: United States
- English publication date: August 24, 2021
- Pages: 816
- ISBN: 9780062942968

The Love Songs of W.E.B. Du Bois is the 2021 debut novel by American poet Honorée Fanonne Jeffers. It explores the history of an African-American family in the American South, from the time before the American Civil War and slavery, through the Civil Rights Movement, to the present. Themes include family history, education, and racism, and the prose narrative is interspersed with poetic passages ("love songs") that provide insight into and detail of the protagonist's ancestors, who are people of African, Creek, and Scottish descent.

== Content ==
The novel covers multiple generations of an African-American family. The novel's protagonist is Ailey Pearl Garfield. While her grandmother wants her to follow the family tradition and become a medical doctor, she wants to be a historian. One of the novel's narrative strands follows her youth and education, and that development is interspersed with her research into her family's history, a story centered in the fictional town of Chicasetta, Georgia, where her family had been enslaved by Samuel Pinchard, a brutal white man who, in the run-up to the American Civil War, also raped the enslaved people.

Throughout the novel, poetic passages ("love songs") chronicle the lives of Ailey's ancestors, who are of African, Creek, and Scottish descent. There is a connection also with Washington, D.C., where Ailey was born, and where her parents moved after getting married; their love and marriage during the Civil rights movement is another narrative strand. In D.C., her father attended Mecca University, a fictionalized version of Howard University. Ailey continues to spend summers in Chicasetta, the geographical heart of the novel, even after leaving for "the City". Ailey attended an HBCU, and becomes close with her great-uncle "Uncle Root", a retired professor there. Also narrated is the story of Ailey's troubled sister, Lydia, whose promise was thwarted by sexual abuse and addiction.

== Characters ==
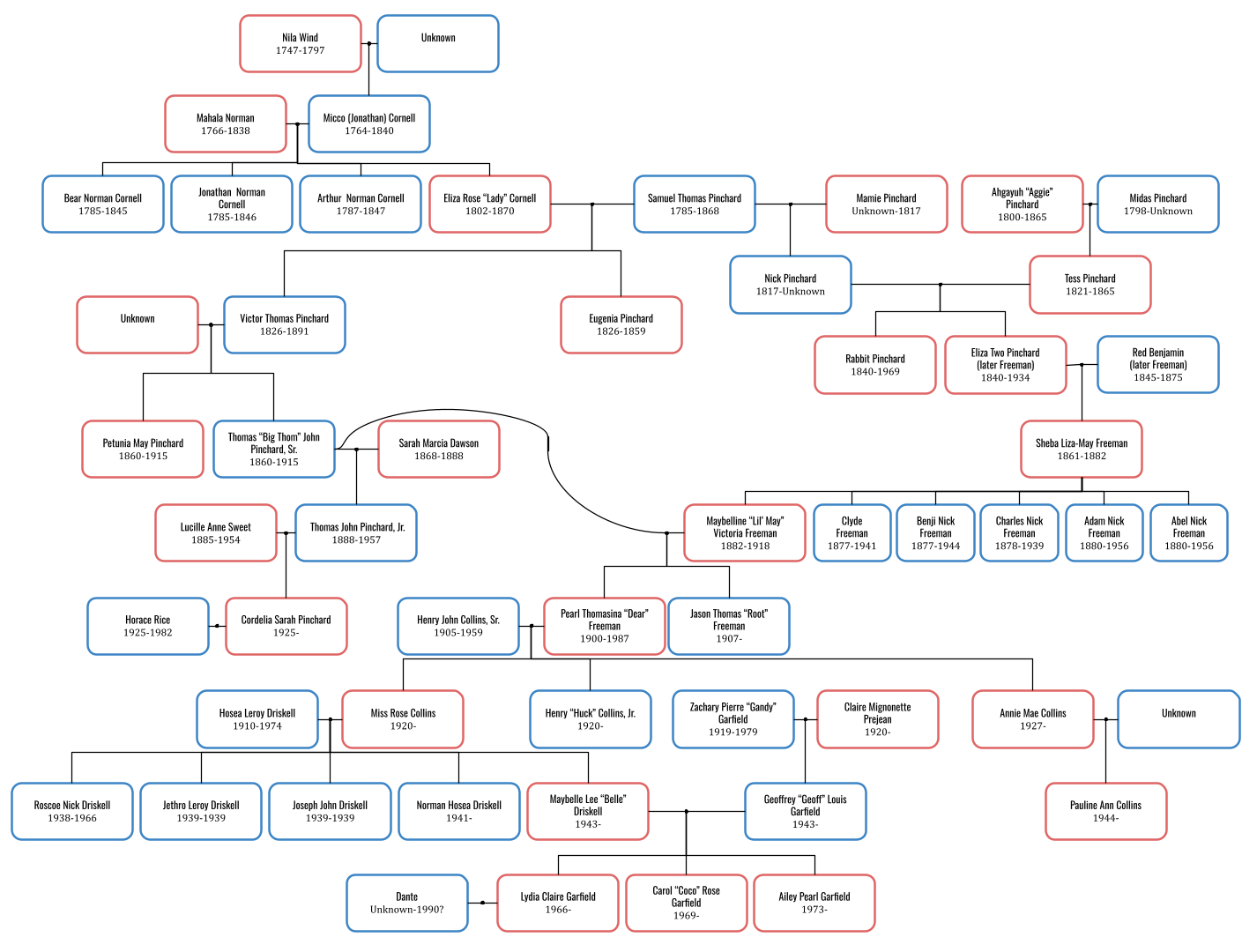
Family Tree form "Love Songs of W.E.B. Du Bois"

- Ailey Pearl Garfield, the youngest daughter of Geoff and Belle
- Geoff Garfield, a medical doctor
- Belle Driskell Garfield, a Southern school teacher
- Lydia, Ailey's sister, victim of sexual abuse which drove her to a crack addiction
- Uncle Root, retired HBCU professor and Ailey's mentor
- Samuel Pinchard, or "White Man with Strange Eyes", a Southern plantation owner who brutalizes and mistreats the people he enslaved

== W. E. B. Du Bois ==
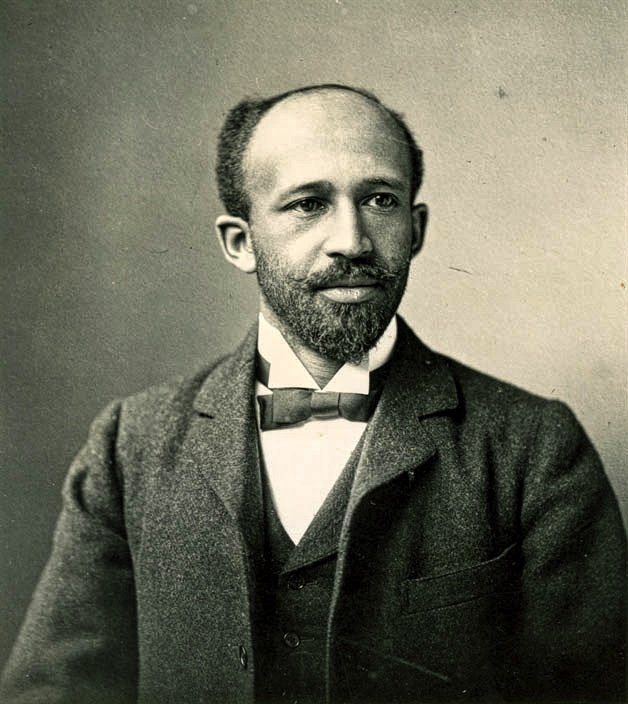
W. E. B. Du Bois c. 1907

Black intellectual, sociologist and civil rights activist W. E. B. Du Bois (1868–1963), according to Jeffers, is present everywhere in the novel, as he was omnipresent for "Black folks who grew up in all-Black spaces and went to HBCUs." According to Lauren LeBlanc, "his belief that Black people are capable of far more than white society expects is a running thread in the novel." Epigrams from the novel come from Du Bois, and he appears in a story told by Uncle Root. Du Bois's concept of "The Talented Tenth" is reflected in Ailey's family and their potential and achievements, even as their lives are always weighed down and threatened by trauma. For Jeffers, it was personal also, she explained: "W. E. B. Du Bois is the most important Black intellectual of the late 19th and most of the 20th century ... the thing about him is that he really loved Black Southerners. They had a special place in his heart. As a Black Southerner, I'm also part of a community that he imagined and that he tried to save. That's why they're the love songs—because these are the people whom he loved."

== Background, publication, advance praise and publicity ==
Lauren LeBlanc, in a preview for Publishers Weekly, provided insight into the novel's genesis. Jeffers, a poet who by 2021 had published a half a dozen collections including the highly praised The Age of Phillis, had written prose before, but was not interested in writing a novel. With the encouragement of a literary agent, Sarah Burnes, in 2016 she delivered a manuscript for what would become her debut novel. In 2018, the manuscript, then 450 pages long, was submitted to Erin Wicks, editor at HarperCollins, which had acquired the rights. Wicks encouraged Jeffers to continue to work on it and to expand it; the next draft was twice as long. Wicks commented: "The shelves of the Western literary canon are filled with so many lengthy epics by men, and I'm excited for Love Songs to hold its own alongside them."

In January 2021, the American Booksellers Association featured Jeffers's novel as one of seven "Buzz Books", discussed at an editors' panel. The novel was mentioned in many summer reading lists. Keyaria Boone, writing for Essence, listed it as one of "18 Books To Throw In Your Carry-On This Summer". Karla Strand, in Ms., listed it in her "Most Anticipated Reads for the Rest of Us 2021", and called it an "utterly remarkable fiction debut". Barbara VanDenburgh, in USA Today, put it on her list of "summer's hottest books". Victoria Wood, for BiblioLifestyle, listed it among the "Most Anticipated Summer 2021 Literary Fiction Books".

The novel was published on August 24, 2021, by HarperCollins. During the 2021 Schomburg Center for Research in Black Culture's annual literary festival, on Juneteenth Jeffers was a featured author and read from the novel and from her 2020 poetry collection, The Age of Phillis.

== Reception ==
In a starred review, Kirkus Reviews had high praise for the "sprawling, ambitious debut novel": "If this isn't the Great American Novel, it's a mighty attempt at achieving one." Similarly, in a starred review, Publishers Weekly called it a "staggering and ambitious saga", and said "readers will be floored". Ron Charles of The Washington Post called the novel "simply magnificent" and celebrated the reading experience: "'The Love Songs of W.E.B. Du Bois' is the kind of book that comes around only once a decade. Yes, at roughly 800 pages, it is, indeed, a mountain to climb, but the journey is engrossing, and the view from the summit with transform your understanding of America."

Writing in The New York Times, reviewer Veronica Chambers enthused: "'The Love Songs of W.E.B. Du Bois' is quite simply the best book that I have read in a very, very long time. I will avoid the cliché of calling it 'a great American novel.' Maybe the truest thing I could say is that this is an epic tale of adventure that brings to mind characters you never forget."

Oprah Winfrey announced on CBS This Morning that the novel was her new selection for her book club.

The novel was longlisted for the 2021 National Book Award for Fiction and was a finalist for the 2021 Kirkus Prize. It was selected for The Washington Post's "10 Best Books of 2021" list. It was also selected for the New York Times Book Review's "10 Best Books of 2021" list.
