= Kin (novel) =

2026 novel by American author Tayari Jones

- First edition cover
- Author: Tayari Jones
- Audio read by: Angel Pean, Ashley J. Hobbs
- Language: English
- Genre: Historical fiction, literary fiction
- Publisher: Alfred A. Knopf
- Publication date: February 24, 2026
- Media type: Print (hardcover), audiobook, ebook
- Pages: 368 (first edition hardcover)
- ISBN: 978-0-525-65918-1 (hardcover)
- Preceded by: An American Marriage

Kin is a 2026 novel by American author Tayari Jones. Her fifth novel, it follows the lives of two motherless girls from the fictional town of Honeysuckle, Louisiana, from childhood in the 1950s through adulthood. The book was published on February 24, 2026, by Knopf. It was selected for Oprah's Book Club, marking Jones's second appearance in the book club following An American Marriage (2018). It won the Kirkus Prize for Fiction in 2026.

== Plot ==
The novel follows Vernice "Niecy" Davis and Annie Johnson, two "cradle friends" who grow up next door to each other in Honeysuckle, Louisiana, a small rural town. Both are motherless. Niecy's mother was killed by her father, who then died by suicide; she is raised by her free-spirited aunt Irene, who saves to send her to college. Annie's mother, Hattie Lee, abandoned her as an infant; she is raised by her grandmother and remains fixated on finding her mother.

After high school, the two follow different paths. Annie runs away from home, intending to go to Memphis to find her mother, Hattie Lee. Her boyfriend, Clyde, dumps her for an old girlfriend, Babydoll. He brings them both along, as well as his cousin, Bobo. The group's car breaks down in a small town and they're forced to spend several weeks doing laundry and maintenance work at a brothel owned by Lulabelle, who becomes a mother figure to Annie. Their stay is extended as Clyde repeatedly uses their earnings to pay for sex with Lulabelle's prostitutes. Annie bonds with Babydoll, and falls in love with Bobo. The group stays together when they finally make it to Memphis, where Annie and Babydoll work at a bar owned by the lecherous Mr. Wilson, Clyde works a succession of short-lived jobs, and Bobo becomes a musician.

Niecy leaves for Spelman College in Atlanta, where she is called a "country mouse" by the other girls and soon becomes close with her wealthy roommate, Joette. They begin a secret romantic relationship that becomes contentious when a Spelman alumna, Mrs. McHenry, befriends Niecy and introduces her to her son, Franklin McHenry, a prominent lawyer that walks with a cane due to polio. Mrs. McHenry begins to treat Niecy like a daughter, giving her advice as she also came from a small town with very little money. When Franklin proposes to Niecy, she ends things with Joette, who leaves Spelman heartbroken. Niecy later hears that Joette is engaged as well and is relieved that she's moved on.

Annie earns Mr. Wilson's frustration by asking several women who come to the bar if they are her mother, Hattie Lee. Her obsession troubles Bobo, who tries to tell her that her mother doesn't deserve her. Annie is determined to visit her mother only when she has a more stable job and home, so that her mother will be proud of her and not think she is coming to her for support. When she finally does go to her last known address, a neighbor claims Hattie Lee died a month earlier. Annie is devasted and mourns her mother, but soon feels freer and happier. She and Bobo begin discussing marriage, and they attend Niecy's wedding in Atlanta. There, Annie witnesses Joette's despair over Niecy's marriage and Niecy admits to the relationship but refuses to speak to Joette about it. After her wedding, Niecy and Franklin live in his parents' house while their new home is under construction. Her mother-in-law teaches her how to keep her home in order and act as a proper housewife. They receive a notice that Joette's wedding has been cancelled.

Hattie Lee's neighbor visits Annie once again and admits that he had lied about her mother having died. He gives Annie her current address, and Annie goes to visit her. She discovers her mother has other children, whom she has not abandoned, including a young girl named Annie. Annie is devastated that her mother has replaced her. Her relationship with Bobo suffers and he leaves her for another woman.

Annie has an affair with her married boss, Mr. Wilson, and becomes pregnant. She writes to Niecy for help to get an abortion. Niecy's husband and in-laws refuse to help. A friend from Spelman gives Niecy a name in Atlanta, and Niecy pays for Annie and Babydoll to travel there. The clinic, which is hidden in a launderette, is raided by police before Annie can receive the abortion. Niecy sends Annie and Babydoll to Lulabelle's with Franklin's car. Annie leaves Niecy with three quarters that she makes her promise to keep for her.

It's revealed that Hattie Lee visited Annie at the bar after she came to her house, and acknowledged her as her daughter, but told her she had nothing to give. The three quarters she left behind were change from a Coca-Cola that Hattie Lee had bought from her.

Annie receives the abortion but dies in the McHenry home of internal bleeding. Niecy, devastated, goes to Joette, who is now running her family's funeral home. She begs Joette to bury Annie, as no other funeral home in Atlanta will handle it discreetly. Joette agrees on the condition that Niecy tell her husband about their romantic relationship. Niecy agrees and admits the truth to Franklin, who is understanding.

In the final chapter, Annie prepares for the abortion at Lulabelle's. When asked by the doctor for a next of kin, she declines to name her mother, and tells the doctor to put down Niecy's name, since she gave her the nickname when they were together in the cradle.

== Background ==
Jones has said that Kin was not the novel she was contracted to write. She had planned a contemporary novel about gentrification in Atlanta but found that the story was not coming together. After the book was two or three years overdue, she began writing with a pencil on paper and discovered two characters, Annie and Vernice, living in the 1950s. Initially she believed she was writing backstory for a contemporary novel, but after about 100 pages she realized that the historical material was the novel itself.

The novel was shaped in part by Jones's return to Atlanta, where she grew up in the Cascade Heights neighborhood. She had been away for more than two decades. Moving back allowed her to listen to stories from her elders, and she has described taking "breadcrumbs" from her mother and letting her imagination piece them together. Jones lost two close friends—one suddenly about five years before writing the novel, another during the COVID-19 pandemic. She has said that navigating those losses made her think about closeness and connection, and that she put her own sense of love onto the pages.

Jones has described the novel as Sula meets Beaches, and the book is dedicated to the two friends she lost.

== Publication ==
Kin was published in the United States by Knopf on February 24, 2026. The first hardcover edition runs 368 pages. The UK edition was published by Oneworld Publications in 2026. An audiobook, narrated by Angel Pean and Ashley J. Hobbs, was released simultaneously. The novel was selected as the first Oprah's Book Club pick of 2026; it was Jones's second appearance in the book club after An American Marriage (2018).

== Reception ==
Publishers Weekly called the novel a "tour de force" and praised Jones for telling "her protagonists' stories with grace, humor, and pathos." The Historical Novel Society noted that Jones's "ability to unfold a tale is just marvelous—there's always something going on, but the plot never feels unrealistic," and called the book "a fierce, occasionally wrenching novel about the meaning of family."

The Spectator wrote that while the title suggests a book about family, "in fact Kin seems more concerned with class," and observed that the novel is "surprisingly traditional" in structure but "in being so outwardly conventional, it manages to overturn expectations and maintain a quiet power." The Atlantic compared Jones to Edith Wharton as "a deft portraitist of class in America," noting Jones's "incisive and thoughtful use of even the tiniest details of socioeconomic status."

The New York Times Book Review, in a review written by Radhika Jones, called the novel "lush" and "beautiful," praising Jones's "light touch and a gift for effortless portraiture." The Boston Globe described the book as "propulsive and compelling." The Ebony review described Kin as "the most challenging read I've experienced in a very long time, probably since reading Toni Morrison's novel Sula."

In a starred review, Kirkus Reviews praised Kin as "beautifully written and powerfully compelling."

== Awards ==
Kin was selected for Oprah's Book Club in February 2026. It won the Kirkus Prize for Fiction in 2026. The novel also appeared on Barack Obama's summer reading list for 2026.
