= Go Gentle (novel) =

2026 novel by Maria Semple

- 2026 hardcover book jacket
- Author: Maria Semple
- Audio read by: Saskia Maarleveld
- Cover artist: Maira Kalman
- Language: English
- Subject: Grief, Comedy, Mystery motif
- Genre: Literary Fiction
- Set in: Manhattan and Paris
- Published: April 2026
- Publisher: Putnam and Sons
- Media type: Print, E-Book, Audio
- Pages: 384
- Awards: NY Times Bestseller list, Oprah book club
- ISBN: 9798217176632
- OCLC: 1529600921
- Website: Official website

Go Gentle is Maria Semple's fourth novel, published by Putnam and Sons in 2026. In the novel, the protagonist, Adora Hazzard has reinvented her life as a Stoic philosophy scholar. She is living in the historically famous Ansonia building in Manhattan. Adora's Stoic ideals are put to the test as her daily routine turns into a "madcap comedy" mystery involving museum bombings, a stolen statue, a strange European broker, and a chaotic trip to Paris. Go Gentle was selected by Oprah Winfrey as an Oprah's Book Club pick. It was also a New York Times bestseller.

== Plot summary ==
The story follows Adora Hazzard, a divorced, middle-aged scholar of Stoic philosophy. She lives in Manhattan's Ansonia building with her teenage daughter, Viv, and a cooperative group of single women of a similar age called "the coven." A series of flashbacks reveals that Adora left her former career as a television writer after being sexually assaulted and signing an NDA. After a suicide attempt, she used the money from her NDA to fund her philosophical education. Adora now works as a writer-in-residence at a Manhattan museum and as a private philosopher for the owners, the affluent Lockwood family. Layla Lockwood initially hired Adora to comfort her husband Lionel after he lost an arm in a climbing accident, though Layla credits the Venus de Milo for actually healing his depression.

One day after work, Adora meets a handsome stranger at the ballet named Digby. They go on a date and Digby reveals he followed Adora from the Lockwood's to ask her to deliver a letter to Layla. Adora delivers the letter, then has sex with Digby. Digby meets with Layla and convinces her to call off a planned art deal with Celine, a French woman whose father helped protect the Louvre art collection during World War II. Celine threatens to tell the Lockwoods about Adora's involvement unless Adora gets Digby to back down. Adora confronts Digby and realizes how little she knows about him. Adora gathers clues and becomes convinced that Layla and Celine were engaging in an illicit arms trade. She goes to the police who raid the Lockwood museum, but it turns out that the "arms deal" was really about statue arms. The Lockwoods fire Adora, who blames Digby for her suffering.

Digby sends Adora a letter revealing himself to be the lawyer who wrote her NDA many years ago and arranges for her to be released from its restrictions. Adora shares her past with Viv on a trip to Paris. Digby sends Adora another letter and explains his history hiding the misdeeds of powerful men, his eventual disillusionment, and his making amends through volunteering his skills to more moral causes. Adora realizes on her own that Layla purchased the lost arms of the Venus de Milo from Celine. Layla was worried Lionel's depression would relapse if the statue regained its arms, whereas Celine was apparently desperate for money. Adora finds Digby in front of the Venus de Milo and they share a passionate kiss that is interrupted by a bomb blowing up the statue. Adora realizes that Celine orchestrated the bombing and the deal with Layla to hide that her father replaced the Venus de Milo with a fake. The true statue is returned to the Louvre and reunited with its arms, and Lionel displays Adora's Stoic teachings by remaining at peace. Adora is given back her job and moves into a larger apartment at the Ansonia with Digby and Viv, finally feeling whole.

== Reception ==
Go Gentle was selected by Oprah Winfrey as an Oprah's Book Club pick. It was also a New York Times bestseller.

Jeff Giles of the The New York Times says of the author: "Semple loves the human race — not in spite of our egos, anxieties and delusions, but because of them — and yet, she knows that calamity is always close at hand... [l]ike all her work, it’s a social satire full of dopamine-releasing one-liners and sparkling writing. " Joanne Kaufman writing for The Wall Street Journal says, "Maria Semple... takes several story lines out for a spin in her teeming novel “Go Gentle.” Depending on their tolerance levels, readers may or may not choose to go along for the ride. Amy Scribner, reviewing this work for the publication BookPage, says, "A thoroughly fun and raucous read that richly explores the wisdom that comes with middle age and the tradeoff between being content and taking chances ... Maria Semple’s newest novel defies easy description ...[with] Plentiful laughs....
