= Jarvis Jay Masters =

American author and death row inmate

- Born: February 24, 1962 (age 64); Long Beach, California, United States
- Status: Held on death row
- Occupation: Author
- Criminal charges: Armed robbery, conspiracy
- Penalty: Death

Details
- Date: 1981 (Armed Robbery); 1990 (Conspiracy)
- Country: United States
- State: California
- Imprisoned at: California Men's Colony

Jarvis Jay Masters (born February 24, 1962) is an American author and former death row inmate at California's San Quentin State Prison.

In October 2025 he was transferred to California Men's Colony in San Luis Obispo County, California.

== Background ==
Masters, who is of African American heritage, was originally sent to San Quentin State Prison in 1981 for armed robbery. In 1990, Masters was convicted of fashioning a weapon that was used by another inmate in the 1985 murder of a prison guard at San Quentin, and sentenced to death. Masters has maintained his innocence through his trial and sentencing, and through the California appeals process.

In 2019, the California Supreme Court upheld Masters' conviction. Masters has presented new evidence of innocence to the United States District Court for the Northern District of California as part of a federal appeal for exoneration. Reporting by The Los Angeles Times details what it describes as "discrepancies in the evidence" to convict Masters, including sworn recantations from the state's original witnesses against Masters, an eyewitness description that does not match Masters, and that another inmate confessed to the crime. The trial jury never heard that confession because it was not disclosed to Masters' attorneys during his original trial.

== Publisher and popular culture ==
Masters is an adherent of Buddhism, and the author of That Bird Has My Wings: The Autobiography of an Innocent Man on Death Row, which was selected by Oprah Winfrey as an Oprah's Book Club selection in September 2022. Winfrey stated her belief in Masters' innocence in an interview with the Los Angeles Times.

Masters is also author of Finding Freedom: How Death Row Broke & Opened My Heart, as well as poems, short stories, articles, essays, and an op-ed in The Guardian newspaper.

Masters is the subject of the book The Buddhist on Death Row by author David Sheff, the iHeart Radio two-season podcast Dear Governor, and an op-ed in the New York Times by author Rebecca Solnit.

His story was also produced in to a show called '''IN|PRISM: Boxed In & Blacked Out in America''' by Truthworker Theater Company.

== See also ==
- List of death row inmates in the United States
