= An American Marriage =

2018 novel by Tayari Jones

- First edition cover
- Author: Tayari Jones
- Audio read by: Eisa Davis; Sean Crisden
- Cover artist: Jaya Miceli
- Language: English
- Genre: Literary fiction
- Set in: Atlanta and Louisiana
- Publisher: Algonquin Books of Chapel Hill
- Publication date: February 6, 2018
- Publication place: United States
- Media type: Print (hardcover and paperback)
- Pages: 308 pp.
- Awards: Aspen Literary Prize (2018); Women's Prize (2019)
- ISBN: 978-1-61620-877-6 (hardcover)
- Dewey Decimal: 813/.6
- LC Class: PS3610.O63 A84 2018
- Website: www.tayarijones.com/books/an-american-marriage

An American Marriage is a novel by the American author Tayari Jones. It is her fourth novel and was published by Algonquin Books on February 6, 2018. In February 2018, the novel was chosen for Oprah's Book Club 2.0. The novel also won the 2019 Women's Prize for Fiction.

The novel focuses on the marriage of a middle-class African-American couple, Celestial and Roy, who live in Atlanta, Georgia. Their lives are torn apart when Roy is wrongfully convicted of a rape he did not commit.

In an interview with The Paris Review Jones revealed that she initially wrote the book solely from Celestial's point of view and decided to add multiple points of view after her initial readers reacted negatively to Celestial.

== Plot ==
Roy, a sales representative for a textbook company, and Celestial, an artist specializing in custom made baby dolls, are newlyweds who live in Atlanta. After their first year of marriage they travel to Eloe, Louisiana to visit Roy's parents. The newlyweds spend the night at a local motel where they feud after Roy tells Celestial that his father is not his biological father. In the middle of their fight they take 15 minutes to cool off during which Roy exits their room and meets a woman around his mother's age with a broken arm whom he helps to her room. Later that night the woman is raped and she calls the police, believing that Roy was the one who raped her. While Roy is in jail awaiting trial, Celestial discovers that she is pregnant and the two decide that she should have an abortion. When the case goes to trial Roy is given a sentence of 12 years.

For the first few years Roy and Celestial keep an active correspondence, though Roy grows frustrated as Celestial's career as an artist begins to take off and the gaps between their letters and visits grows longer. During this period Roy discovers that his cellmate Walter is actually his biological father and shares the news with Celestial. Also during this time, Roy learns that his mother Olive has died. After three years Celestial tells Roy that she no longer wishes to be his wife, causing a rift between them. Roy refuses communication with Celestial for the following two years, however when his case is finally overturned on appeal and the local District Attorney decides not to pursue the case, he optimistically reaches out to Celestial believing that there is still hope for their marriage as she has never divorced him.

Celestial has, in the meantime, fallen in love with her childhood best friend, Andre. The night she learns that Roy is about to be set free, Andre proposes. Despite her guilt, Celestial decides to divorce Roy and marry Andre. Though the rest of her family accept her choice, the news causes a rift between Celestial and her father.

Roy is released from prison early and is collected by his father, Roy Sr. Aware that Celestial plans to have Andre pick him up, Roy decides to leave for Atlanta just as Andre is leaving to collect him, ensuring that he will have time to spend alone with Celestial. Before he leaves, Roy runs into a former classmate of his, Davina, who invites him over for dinner. The two end up having sex which Roy feels is meaningful. He nevertheless decides to leave for Atlanta to pursue a relationship with his wife.

In Atlanta, Roy is relieved to find that his key still works and surprises Celestial by being at home when she comes back from her doll shop. Roy tries to have sex with her but she asks him to use protection, knowing that he does not have any. The following day Andre arrives and in the ensuing argument about what happened when Roy was in jail Roy attacks and beats Andre on Celestial's lawn. Though the police are called Celestial manages to smooth things over. Celestial returns with Roy to her house and the following morning tells Andre that she needs to be with Roy. That night however, when Roy confesses to having sex with Davina, Celestial has no reaction causing Roy to realize that Celestial truly no longer loves him romantically. Though she is willing to have sex with him he declines saying he has never been and will never be a rapist.

In the epilogue Roy and Celestial exchange letters. Celestial informs Roy that though she and Andre are having a baby they have no plans to marry and Roy tells Celestial that he has reunited with Davina and the two plan to marry.

== Reception ==
The New York Times praised it as a "wise and compassionate" novel. The Globe and Mail called the novel "sensational". The Washington Post commended Jones for her "daring creative choices" and "tender patience". The Guardian described the book as, "an immensely readable novel, packed with ideas and emotion". The Atlantic positively noted that, "with An American Marriage, Jones joins this conversation in a quietly powerful way. Her writing illuminates the bits and pieces of a marriage: those almost imperceptible moments that make it, break it, and forcefully tear it apart." In 2024, The New York Times ranked it #78 of the best 100 novels of the 21st century.

== Awards ==
Year	Award	Category	Result	Ref.
2018	Los Angeles Times Book Prize	Fiction	Finalist	
2018	National Book Award	Fiction	Longlisted	
2019	Aspen Words Literary Prize	—	Won	
2019	NAACP Image Awards	Fiction	Won	
2019	Orwell Prize	Political Fiction	Longlisted	
2019	Women's Prize for Fiction	—	Won	

== Film Adaptation ==
Paramount Pictures purchased the film rights.
