= Little Wonder (novel) =

2026 novel by Sophie Chen Keller

- Author: Sophie Chen Keller
- Language: English
- Genre: Literary fiction
- Publisher: Thousand Voices (an imprint of Ballantine Books / Penguin Random House)
- Publication date: June 16, 2026
- Media type: Print (hardcover), audiobook, e‑book
- Pages: 352
- ISBN: 9798217094608

Little Wonder is a 2026 novel by Sophie Chen Keller. Published by Jenna Bush Hager's Thousand Voices imprint, the book was selected as an Oprah's Book Club pick in June 2026.

== Plot ==
The novel is set in modern-day China and follows Song, a food delivery worker from a village in northeastern China, and her son River, a piano prodigy. At the age of three, River toddled to a piano and tapped out his favourite song; by five, he had mastered Liszt's Liebesträume; by eight, he had worked through Chopin's études. Song, a widow, has supported her son's talent through loss, illness, and poverty.

When River is eleven, he is invited to study with a preeminent teacher in Beijing. Mother and son travel to the city just before the Spring Festival in 2016. In the chaos of Beijing Railway Station on one of the busiest days of the year, Song loses her grip on River's hand and is unable to find him after a desperate search. The novel follows Song and River over the following days, weeks, and years as they both fight to find their way back to each other while building separate lives that carry them further apart.

The narrative alternates between Song's terrified efforts to locate her son and River's experience of being lost. Both characters encounter and rely on a variety of supporting figures who become found family. The novel also reaches back to earlier years, revealing the reasons for Song's travels with River and her relationship with his late father, Blue. The story culminates in a cinematic ending after the two have spent five years apart.

== Major themes ==
The novel explores the bond between mother and child, love, loss, hope, and perseverance. It examines the lives of migrant workers in Beijing, rural poverty, wealth disparity in Chinese society, and the COVID-19 lockdowns from the perspective of those living in China. Music functions as a central element of River's identity and as a form of language, connection, and survival. The novel also portrays both biological family and found family, and explores the idea of "home" as a place, a person, or something else.

== Publication history ==
Little Wonder was published on June 16, 2026, by Thousand Voices, the publishing imprint founded by Jenna Bush Hager in partnership with the Random House Publishing Group. The book was released in hardcover, audiobook, and e-book formats.

The novel was selected as Oprah Winfrey's 124th Book Club pick. Hager sent an early copy to Winfrey and facilitated the phone call during which Winfrey informed Keller of the selection.
