= Where'd You Go, Bernadette (novel) =

2012 novel by Maria Semple

- First edition
- Editor: Judy Clain
- Author: Maria Semple
- Cover artist: Keith Hayes
- Language: English
- Genre: General-Fiction
- Published: August 2012 Little, Brown & Company
- Publisher: Little, Brown & Company
- Publication date: August 14, 2012
- Publication place: United States of America
- Media type: Hardcover
- Pages: 336 (In the 2012 hardcover version)
- ISBN: 978-0-316-20427-9

Where'd You Go, Bernadette is a 2012 epistolary comedy novel written by Maria Semple. The plot revolves around an agoraphobic architect and mother named Bernadette Fox, who goes missing prior to a family trip to Antarctica. It is narrated by her 15-year-old daughter Bee Branch, and is told in a series of documents (emails, memos, transcripts, etc.) with the occasional interlude by Bee.

== Synopsis ==
15-year-old Bee Branch lives in Seattle with her parents, agoraphobic stay-at-home mother Bernadette Fox and computer genius Elgin Branch, who works at Microsoft. After being promised a reward of her choosing in exchange for good grades, Bee presents her parents with a perfect report card and requests a family vacation to Antarctica. Bernadette delegates the task of making their arrangements to a personal assistant in India named Manjula, and has ongoing feuds with some of the other mothers at Bee's private school, the main instigator of which is their neighbor Audrey Griffin. Their tension escalates when Audrey falsely accuses Bernadette of running over her foot with her car, which Bernadette does not dispute, and when the hillside above Audrey’s house, recently cleared of blackberries by Bernadette at Audrey’s request, collapses during a rainstorm and slides into Audrey’s house.

Soo-Lin Lee-Segal, a friend of Audrey's and admin at Microsoft, goes to work for Elgin. After she informs him of Bernadette's "attacks" on Audrey, he considers admitting Bernadette to a psychiatric institution. As Soo-Lin and Elgin begin an emotional affair, the FBI contacts Elgin to reveal that "Manjula" is a front for a Russian crime organization who plan to defraud Elgin and Bernadette. Elgin stages an intervention at their home with the FBI and police present, in the midst of which Bernadette excuses herself to go to the bathroom, but does not return. Bee, who has been admitted to Choate Rosemary Hall, is sent there early after Bernadette's disappearance, and begins to collect correspondence related to her mother to ascertain what has happened to her.

Bee learns that Bernadette was once a famous architect who earned a MacArthur "Genius" Grant after creating the 20 Mile House in Los Angeles, so-called because it was made entirely of materials sourced from within 20 miles of the house. After winning the grant, Bernadette sold the house, only to realize that it had been sold to a hostile neighbor who demolished the house immediately upon obtaining it. This caused Bernadette to lose her creative passion and prompted her relocation to Seattle, where she suffered four miscarriages before becoming pregnant with Bee.

A miserable Soo-Lin reveals to Audrey that she is pregnant by Elgin as a result of a drunken one-night stand, which Elgin regrets, and that he has bought them a family home. Elgin and Soo-Lin learn that Bernadette went to Antarctica by herself, and go there to confront her, only for her to disappear again.

At Choate, Bee receives a package containing the bulk of the correspondence used in the novel up to that point. It is revealed that, after discovering that the accusations she leveled against Bernadette would result in her being hospitalized, a guilt-ridden Audrey helped her escape, showed her all the correspondence between Soo-Lin and Elgin, and sent the package to Bee in the hopes that she would then understand what happened to Bernadette.

Bee is expelled from Choate, in part because of the manuscript she is putting together. She convinces her father to go to Antarctica with her under the guise of receiving closure, though she secretly believes her mother is hiding there. After nearly giving up hope, Bee learns of Palmer Station, an American base where scientists work and research. Bee and Elgin steal a boat and go to the station, where they find Bernadette.

Upon returning home, Bee finds a letter sent to her by Bernadette while she was at Choate, where Bernadette explains that she went to Antarctica in the hopes of reconciling with her family and decided to stay for the cruise. While there, she met a scientist who told her about Palmer Station and an architectural project for the South Pole in which every material would have to be shipped from the U.S. Bernadette snuck on board Palmer Station, hoping to work on the project, and sent the letter to Bee asking for her blessing and promising to return home if she did not get it within a set period of time.

== Bestseller lists ==
- A year on the New York Times Bestseller List
- 72 weeks on NPR Paperback Fiction Bestseller List
- 12 weeks on NPR Hardcover Fiction Bestseller List

== Awards ==
- Shortlisted for the 2013 Women's Prize for Fiction
- Alex Award 2013, American Library Association

== Audiobook ==
- An audiobook version was released in 2012 by Hachette Audio, read by narrator Kathleen Wilhoite.

== Film adaptation ==
Annapurna Pictures and Color Force acquired the rights to the film adaptation of the novel in January 2013. Scott Neustadter and Michael H. Weber were initially set to write the screenplay. Maria Semple and Ted Schipper executive produced. Richard Linklater directed the film, and Cate Blanchett starred. Linklater, Holly Gent, and Vince Palmo are credited for the finished script. Kristen Wiig, Billy Crudup, Laurence Fishburne, Troian Bellisario and Judy Greer co-starred. Production began in July 2017. The film was released in August 2019.

== See also ==
- Go Gentle by Maria Semple
