= Joe Weixlmann =

American professor (born 1946)

Joseph Norman Weixlmann, Jr. (born 1946), is an American academic who is Emeritus Professor of English and former Provost of Saint Louis University in St. Louis, Missouri.

== Biography ==
Joe Weixlmann was born in Buffalo, New York, in 1946, to Joseph Norman Weixlmann, Sr, and Mary Weixlmann.

After serving as an English professor for decades, Joe Weixlmann became the Dean of Arts & Sciences at Indiana State University. In 2001, he accepted the position of Dean of the College of Arts & Sciences at Saint Louis University, and in 2004 was promoted to the Provost position.

On July 15, 2009, it was announced that Dr. Weixlmann would step down from his position as Provost at Saint Louis University, effective July 31, 2009. He subsequently served the university as Professor and Director of Graduate Studies in English until retiring from Saint Louis University in 2017. Since then, he has continued to publish his research on African-American fiction, especially the work of Percival Everett.

Weixlmann served as editor of African American Review for 28 years.
