= Mantua, Alabama =

Unincorporated community in Alabama, US

- Unincorporated community
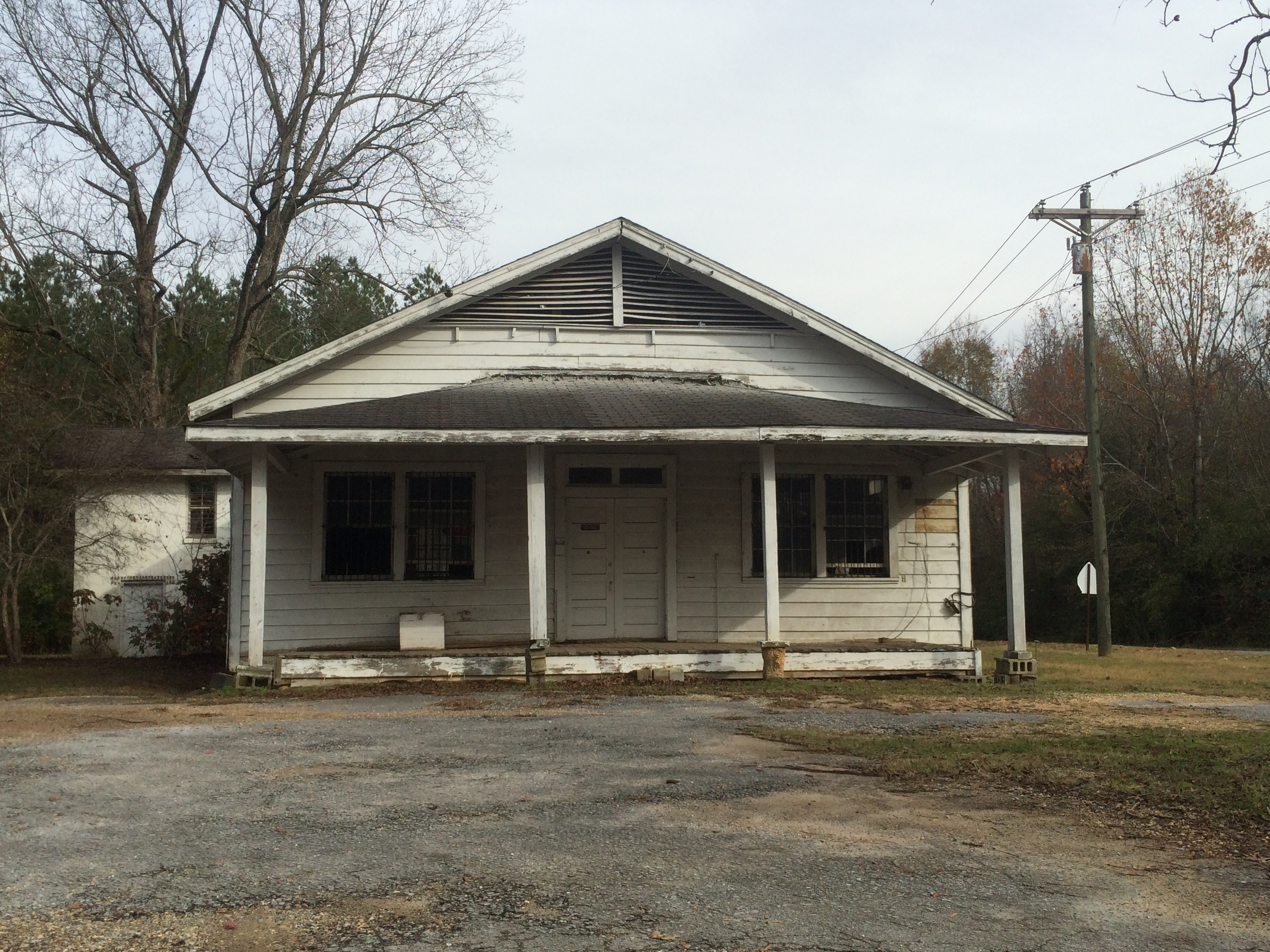
- Former Mantua post office

- Location within Alabama Location within the United States
- Coordinates: 33°03′13″N 87°55′44″W
- Country: United States
- State: Alabama
- County: Greene
- Elevation: 246 ft (75 m)
- Time zone: UTC-6 (Central (CST))
  - Summer (DST): UTC-5 (CDT)
- Area codes: 205, 659
- GNIS feature ID: 156654

Mantua is an unincorporated community in Greene County, Alabama, United States.

== History ==
Mantua was most likely named after Mantua, Italy. Settlers from Spartanburg, South Carolina, arrived in the area in early 1800s. Originally part of Pickens County, Manutua became part of Greene County in the 1860s after residents petitioned for the change. A post office operated under the name Mantua from 1880 to 1989.
