= Hurston/Wright Legacy Award =

Literary award for African American writers

The Hurston/Wright Legacy Awards program in the United States honors published Black writers worldwide for literary achievement. Introduced in 2001, the Legacy Award was the first national award presented to Black writers by a national organization of Black writers. It is granted for fiction, nonfiction and poetry, selected in a juried competition.

Each fall, writers and publishers are invited to submit fiction, nonfiction and poetry books published that year. Panels of acclaimed writers serve as judges to select nominees, finalists and winners. A number of merit awards are also presented. Nominees are honored at the Legacy Awards ceremony, held the third Friday in October. The awards ceremony is hosted and organized by the Hurston/Wright Foundation.

== Merit awards ==
In addition to the Legacy Awards, the Hurston/Wright board of directors may present Merit awards during the annual Legacy Award ceremony.

- The North Star Award pays homage to the significance of the North Star for enslaved Africans, who looked to it as a guide to gaining freedom in the North. It is awarded to individuals whose writing and/or service to the writing community serve as a beacon of brilliant accomplishment and as an inspiration to others.
- The Ella Baker Award, named for the heroic civil rights activist, recognizes writers and arts activists for exceptional work that advances social justice.
- The Madam C.J. Walker Award, named for the pioneering entrepreneur and philanthropist, recognizes exceptional innovation in supporting and sustaining Black literature.

== Legacy Award winners ==
=== Fiction ===
==== Contemplative fiction ====
Contemplative fiction winners
Year	Author	Work	Ref.
2005	Tracy Price-Thompson	A Woman's Worth	
2006	Clyde W. Ford	The Long Mile: The Shango Mysteries	

==== Debut fiction ====
Debut fiction winners
Year	Author	Work	Ref.
2002	David Anthony Durham	Gabriel's Story	
2003	Tayari Jones	Leaving Atlanta	
2004	Chimamanda Ngozi Adichie	Purple Hibiscus	
2005	Chris Abani	GraceLand	
2006	Denise Nicholas	Freshwater Road	
2007	Aminatta Forna	Ancestor Stones	
2008	Kwame Dawes	She's Gone	
2016	Sanderia Faye	Mourner's Bench	
2017	JJ Amaworo Wilson	Damnificados	
2018	Ladee Hubbard	The Talented Ribkins	
2020	Jeffrey Colvin	Africaville	
2021	Rita Woods	Remembrance	
2022	Quntos KunQuest	This Life	
2023	Meron Hadero	A Down Home Meal for These Difficult Times: Stories	
2024	Soraya Palmer	The Human Origins of Beatrice Porter and Other Essential Ghosts	

==== General fiction ====
General fiction winners
Year	Author	Work	Ref.
2002	Percival Everett	Erasure	
2003	Zakes Mda	The Heart of Redness	
2004	Mat Johnson	Hunting in Harlem	
2005	Maryse Condé	Who Slashed Celanire's Throat?	
2006	Nancy Rawles	My Jim	
2007	Edward P. Jones	All Aunt Hagar's Children	
2008	Junot Díaz	The Brief Wondrous Life of Oscar Wao	
2009	Uwem Akpan	Say You're One of Them	
2010	Percival Everett	I Am Not Sidney Poitier	
2011	Danielle Evans	Before You Suffocate Your Own Fool Self	
2012	Helen Oyeyemi	Mr. Fox	
2013	Esi Edugyan	Half-Blood Blues	
2014	NoViolet Bulawayo	We Need New Names	
2015	Laila Lalami	The Moor's Account	
2016	James Hannaham	Delicious Foods	
2017	Colson Whitehead	The Underground Railroad	
2018	Alain Mabanckou	Black Moses	
2019	Nafissa Thompson-Spires	Heads of the Colored People	
2020	Curdella Forbes	A Tall History of Sugar	
2021	Percival Everett	Telephone	
2022	Percival Everett	The Trees	
2023	James Hannaham	Didn't Nobody Give a Shit What Happened to Carlotta	
2024	Mihret Sibhat	The History of a Difficult Child	

==== Speculative fiction ====
Speculative fiction winners
Year	Author	Work	Ref.
2023	T. L. Huchu	Our Lady of Mysterious Ailments	

=== Nonfiction ===
==== General nonfiction ====
General nonfiction winners
Year	Author	Work	Ref.
2002	Ken Wiwa	In the Shadow of a Saint: A Son's Journey to Understand His Father's Legacy	
2003	Elizabeth McHenry	Forgotten Readers: Recovering the Lost History of African American Literary Societies	
2004	Wil Haygood	In Black and White: The Life of Sammy Davis, Jr.	
2005	Alexis De Veaux	Warrior Poet: A Biography of Audre Lorde	
2006	John Hope Franklin	Mirror to America: The Autobiography of John Hope Franklin	
2007	Wangari Maathai	Unbowed: A Memoir	
2008	Edwige Danticat	Brother, I'm Dying	
2009	Frank B. Wilderson	Incognegro: A Memoir of Exile and Apartheid	
2010	Robin Kelley	Thelonious Monk: The Life and Times of an American Original	
2011	Isabel Wilkerson	The Warmth of Other Suns: The Epic Story of America's Great Migration	
2012	Tomiko Brown-Nagin	Courage to Dissent: Atlanta and the Long History of the Civil Rights Movement	
2013	Fredrick Harris	The Price of the Ticket: Barack Obama and Rise and Decline of Black Politics	
2014	Craig Wilder	Ebony & Ivy	
2015	Elizabeth Nunez	Not For Everyday Use	
2016	Pamela Newkirk	Spectacle: The Astonishing Life of Ota Benga	
2017	Kali Nicole Gross	Hannah Mary Tabbs and the Disembodied Torso: A Tale of Race, Sex, and Violence in America	
2018	Tiya Miles	The Dawn of Detroit: A Chronicle of Slavery and Freedom in the City of the Straits	
2019	Imani Perry	May We Forever Stand: A History of the Black National Anthem	
2020	Albert Woodfox	Solitary: My Story of Transformation and Hope	
2021	Marcia Chatelain	Franchise: The Golden Arches in Black America	

==== Historical/Social/Political ====
Historical/Social/Political nonfiction winners
Year	Author	Work	Ref.
2022	Howard W. French	Born in Blackness	
2023	Mariame Burnham	By Hands Now Known: Jim Crow's Legal Executioners	

==== Memoir/Biography ====
Memoir/Biography winners
Year	Author	Work	Ref.
2022	Shanna Greene Benjamin	Half in Shadow: The Life and Legacy of Nellie Y. McKay	
2023	Ross Gay	Inciting Joy	

=== Poetry ===
Poetry winners
Year	Author	Work	Ref.
2007	Patricia Smith	Teahouse of the Almighty	
2008	Kyle G. Dargan	Bouquet of Hungers	
2009	Myronn Hardy	The Headless Saints	
2010	Rita Dove	Sonata Mulattica: Poems	
2010	Haki R. Madhubuti	Liberation Narratives: New and Collected Poems	
2011	Elizabeth Alexander	Crave Radiance: New and Selected Poems 1990–2010	
2012	Evie Shockley	the new black	
2013	Lucille Clifton	The Collected Poems of Lucille Clifton 1965–2010	
2014	Amaud Jamaul Johnson	Darktown Follies	
2015	Claudia Rankine	Citizen: An American Lyric	
2016	Vievee Francis	Forest Primeval	
2017	Donika Kelly	Bestiary	
2018	Evie Shockley	Semiautomatic	
2019	Terrance Hayes	American Sonnets for My Past and Future Assassin	
2020	Ladan Osman	Exiles of Eden	
2021	Rachel Eliza Griffiths	Seeing the Body	
2022	Shara McCallum	No Ruined Stone	
2023	Courtney Faye Taylor	Concentrate	

== Winners, finalists, and nominees ==
=== Fiction ===
==== Contemporary fiction ====
Contemporary fiction winners, finalists, and nominees
Year	Author	Work	Result	Ref.
2005	Tracy Price-Thompson	A Woman's Worth	Winner	
2005	Erica Kennedy	Bling	Nominee	
2005	Bridgett M. Davis	Shifting Through Neutral	Nominee	
2005	David E. Talbert	Love on the Dotted Line	Nominee	
2006	Clyde W. Ford	The Long Mile: The Shango Mysteries	Winner	
2006	Benilde Little	Who Does She Think She Is?	Nominee	

==== Debut fiction ====
Debut fiction winners, finalists, and nominees
Year	Author	Work	Result	Ref.
2002	David Anthony Durham	Gabriel's Story	Winner	
2002	Kuwana Haulsey	The Red Moon	Finalist	
2002	Joyce Palmer	Greenwichtown	Finalist	
2002	Patricia Elam	Breathing Room	Nominee	
2002	Dana Johnson	Break Any Woman Down	Nominee	
2002	Nichelle D. Tramble	The Dying Ground	Nominee	
2003	Tayari Jones	Leaving Atlanta	Winner	
2003	Nicole Bailey-Williams	A Little Piece Of Sky	Finalist	
2003	Zelda Lockhart	Fifth Born	Finalist	
2003	Donna Hemans	River Woman	Nominee	
2003	Marc Nesbitt	Gigantic	Nominee	
2003	Nelly Rosario	Song of the Water Saints	Nominee	
2004	Chimamanda Ngozi Adichie	Purple Hibiscus	Winner	
2004	Stephanie Allen	A Place Between Stations	Finalist	
2004	April Reynolds	Knee-Deep in Wonder	Finalist	
2004	Asha Bandele	Daughter	Nominee	
2004	ZZ Packer	Drinking Coffee Elsewhere	Nominee	
2004	Suzan-Lori Parks	Getting Mother's Body	Nominee	
2005	Chris Abani	GraceLand	Winner	
2005	Esi Edugyan	The Second Life of Samuel Tyne	Nominee	
2005	Delores Phillips	The Darkest Child	Nominee	
2006	Denise Nicholas	Freshwater Road	Winner	
2006	Doreen Baingana	Tropical Fish: Tales from Entebbe	Nominee	
2006	Kalisha Buckhanon	Upstate	Nominee	
2007	Aminatta Forna	Ancestor Stones	Winner	
2007	Marie-Elena John	Unburnable	Nominee	
2007	Asali Solomon	Get Down: Stories	Nominee	
2008	Kwame Dawes	She's Gone	Winner	
2008	Ravi Howard	Like Trees, Walking	Nominee	
2008	Nathan McCall	Them	Nominee	
2016	Sanderia Faye	Mourner's Bench	Winner	
2016	Naomi Jackson	The Star Side of Bird Hill	Nominee	
2016	Chigozie Obioma	The Fishermen	Nominee	
2017	JJ Amaworo Wilson	Damnificados	Winner	
2017	A. Igoni Barrett	Blackass	Nominee	
2017	Elnathan John	Born on a Tuesday	Nominee	
2018	Ladee Hubbard	The Talented Ribkins	Winner	
2018	Zinzi Clemmons	What We Lose	Nominee	
2018	Rivers Solomon	An Unkindness of Ghosts	Nominee	
2020	Jeffrey Colvin	Africaville	Winner	
2020	Ron A. Austin	Avery Colt Is a Snake, a Thief, a Liar	Nominee	
2020	Sion Dayson	As a River	Nominee	
2021	Rita Woods	Remembrance	Winner	
2021	Tola Rotimi Abraham	Black Sunday	Nominee	
2021	Steven Wright	The Coyotes of Carthage	Nominee	
2022	Quntos KunQuest	This Life	Winner	
2022	Khadija Abdalla Bajaber	The House of Rust	Nominee	
2022	Sifiso Mzobe	Young Blood	Nominee	
2022	Dawnie Walton	The Final Revival of Opal and Nev	Nominee	
2023	Meron Hadero	A Down Home Meal for These Difficult Times: Stories	Winner	
2023	Leila Mottley	Nightcrawling	Nominee	
2023	Natasha Gordon-Chipembere	Finding La Negrita	Nominee	

==== General fiction ====
Fiction winners, finalists, and nominees
Year	Author	Work	Result	Ref.
2002	Percival Everett	Erasure	Winner	
2002	Maxine Clair	October Suite	Finalist	
2002	Anthony Grooms	Bombingham	Finalist	
2002	Bernice L. McFadden	The Warmest December	Nominee	
2002	Reginald McKnight	He Sleeps	Nominee	
2002	Walter Mosley	Fearless Jones	Nominee	
2003	Zakes Mda	The Heart of Redness	Winner	
2003	Victor Lavalle	The Ecstatic	Finalist	
2003	Jewell Parker Rhodes	Douglass' Women	Finalist	
2003	Elizabeth Nunez	Discretion	Nominee	
2003	Yvonne Vera	Without a Name and Under the Tongue	Nominee	
2003	Crystal Wilkinson	Water Street	Nominee	
2004	Mat Johnson	Hunting in Harlem	Winner	
2004	Austin Clarke	The Polished Hoe	Finalist	
2004	Caryl Phillips	A Distant Shore	Finalist	
2004	Barbara Chase-Riboud	Hottentot Venus	Nominee	
2004	Nalo Hopkinson	The Salt Roads	Nominee	
2004	Edward P. Jones	The Known World	Nominee	
2005	Maryse Condé	Who Slashed Celanire's Throat?	Winner	
2005	Edwige Danticat	The Dew Breaker	Finalist	
2005	Zakes Mda	The Madonna of Excelsior	Finalist	
2005	Percival Everett	American Desert	Nominee	
2005	Nuruddin Farah	Links	Nominee	
2005	Walter Mosley	The Man in My Basement	Nominee	
2006	Nancy Rawles	My Jim	Winner	
2006	David Anthony Durham	Pride of Carthage	Finalist	
2006	Tayari Jones	The Untelling	Finalist	
2006	Tananarive Due	Joplin's Ghost	Nominee	
2006	Caryl Phillips	Dancing in the Dark	Nominee	
2006	Martha Southgate	Third Girl from the Left	Nominee	
2007	Edward P. Jones	All Aunt Hagar's Children	Winner	
2007	Chimamanda Ngozi Adichie	Half of a Yellow Sun	Finalist	
2007	Calvin Baker	Dominion	Finalist	
2007	Bernice L. McFadden	Nowhere Is a Place	Nominee	
2007	Kim McLarin	Jump at the Sun	Nominee	
2007	Ngũgĩ wa Thiong'o	Wizard of the Crow	Nominee	
2008	Junot Díaz	The Brief Wondrous Life of Oscar Wao	Winner	
2008	Maryse Condé	The Story of the Cannibal Woman	Finalist	
2008	Lawrence Hill	Someone Knows My Name	Finalist	
2008	Jan Carew	The Guyanese Wander	Nominee	
2008	Helon Habila	Measuring Time	Nominee	
2008	Helen Oyeyemi	The Opposite House	Nominee	
2009	Uwem Akpan	Say You're One of Them	Winner	
2009	Jeffery Renard Allen	Holding Pattern: Stories	Finalist	
2009	Jesmyn Ward	Where the Line Bleeds	Finalist	
2009	Breena Clarke	Stand the Storm	Nominee	
2009	Tananarive Due	Blood Colony	Nominee	
2009	James McBride	Song Yet Sung	Nominee	
2010	Percival Everett	I Am Not Sidney Poitier	Winner	
2010	Bernardine Evaristo	Blonde Roots	Finalist	
2010	Colson Whitehead	Sag Harbor	Finalist	
2010	Chielo Zona Eze	The Trial of Robert Mugabe	Nominee	
2010	Victor Lavalle	Big Machine	Nominee	
2010	Attica Locke	Black Water Rising	Nominee	
2011	Danielle Evans	Before You Suffocate Your Own Fool Self	Winner	
2011	Bernice L. McFadden	Glorious	Finalist	
2011	Dolen Perkins-Valdez	Wench	Finalist	
2011	Dinaw Mengestu	How to Read the Air	Nominee	
2011	Rosalyn Story	Wading Home: A Novel of New Orleans	Nominee	
2011	Tiphanie Yanique	How to Escape from a Leper Colony	Nominee	
2012	Helen Oyeyemi	Mr. Fox	Winner	
2012	Tayari Jones	Silver Sparrow	Finalist	
2012	Colson Whitehead	Zone One	Finalist	
2012	Nuruddin Farah	Crossbones	Nominee	
2012	Danzy Senna	You Are Free	Nominee	
2012	Jesmyn Ward	Salvage the Bones	Nominee	
2013	Esi Edugyan	Half-Blood Blues	Winner	
2013	Yvvette Edwards	A Cupboard Full of Coats	Nominee	
2013	Dana Johnson	Elsewhere, California	Nominee	
2013	Attica Locke	The Cutting Season	Nominee	
2013	Ayana Mathis	The Twelve Tribes of Hattie	Nominee	
2013	Bernice L. McFadden	Gathering of Waters	Nominee	
2014	NoViolet Bulawayo	We Need New Names	Winner	
2014	Mitchell S. Jackson	The Residue Years	Finalist	
2014	Jamaica Kincaid	See Now Then	Finalist	
2014	Preston L. Allen	Every Boy Should Have a Man	Nominee	
2014	James McBride	The Good Lord Bird	Nominee	
2014	Courttia Newland	The Gospel According to Cane	Nominee	
2015	Laila Lalami	The Moor's Account	Winner	
2015	Roxane Gay	An Untamed State	Finalist	
2015	Tiphanie Yanique	Land of Love and Drowning	Finalist	
2015	Chris Abani	The Secret History of Las Vegas	Nominee	
2015	Ishmael Beah	Radiance of Tomorrow	Nominee	
2015	Nadifa Mohamed	The Orchard of Lost Souls	Nominee	
2016	James Hannaham	Delicious Foods	Winner	
2016	Angela Flournoy	The Turner House	Finalist	
2016	Caryl Phillips	The Lost Child	Finalist	
2016	Paul Beatty	The Sellout	Nominee	
2016	T. Geronimo Johnson	Welcome to Braggsville	Nominee	
2016	Chinelo Okparanta	Under the Udala Trees	Nominee	
2017	Colson Whitehead	The Underground Railroad	Winner	
2017	Amina Gautier	The Loss of All Lost Things	Finalist	
2017	Jacqueline Woodson	Another Brooklyn	Finalist	
2017	Yvvette Edwards	The Mother	Nominee	
2017	Bernice McFadden	The Book of Harlan	Nominee	
2017	Zadie Smith	Swing Time	Nominee	
2018	Alain Mabanckou	Black Moses	Winner	
2018	Yewande Omotoso	The Woman Next Door	Finalist	
2018	Jesmyn Ward	Sing, Unburied, Sing	Finalist	
2018	Lesley Nneka Arimah	What It Means When a Man Falls from the Sky	Nominee	
2018	Ernest J. Gaines	The Tragedy of Brady Sims	Nominee	
2018	Peter Kimani	Dance of the Jakaranda	Nominee	
2019	Nafissa Thompson-Spires	Heads of the Colored People	Winner	
2019	Wayétu Moore	She Would Be King	Finalist	
2019	Jamel Brinkley	A Lucky Man	Finalist	
2019	Nana Kwame Adjei-Brenyah	Friday Black	Nominee	
2019	David Chariandy	Brother	Nominee	
2019	Esi Edugyan	Washington Black	Nominee	
2020	Curdella Forbes	A Tall History of Sugar	Winner	
2020	Rion Amilcar Scott	The World Doesn't Require You	Finalist	
2020	Helen Oyeyemi	Gingerbread	Finalist	
2020	Kalisha Buckhanon	Speaking of Summer	Nominee	
2020	Nicole Dennis-Benn	Patsy	Nominee	
2020	Margaret Wilkerson Sexton	The Revisioners	Nominee	
2021	Percival Everett	Telephone	Winner	
2021	Ben Okri	The Freedom Artist	Finalist	
2021	P. Djèlí Clark	Ring Shout	Finalist	
2021	Morgan Christie	These Bodies	Nominee	
2021	Lauren Francis-Sharma	Book of the Little Axe	Nominee	
2021	Alice Randall	Black Bottom Saints	Nominee	
2022	Percival Everett	The Trees	Winner	
2022	Ladee Hubbard	Rib King	Nominee	
2022	Natashia Deon	The Perishing	Nominee	
2022	J.J. Amaworo Wilson	Nazaré	Nominee	
2022	Sadeqa Johnson	Yellow Wife	Nominee	
2022	Alaya Dawn Johnson	Reconstruction: Stories	Nominee	
2023	James Hannaham	Didn't Nobody Give a Shit What Happened to Carlotta	Winner	
2023	Dolen Perkins-Valdez	Take My Hand	Nominee	
2023	Dionne Irving	The Islands	Nominee	
2023	Candice Carty-Williams	People Person	Nominee	
2023	Jacinda Townsend	Mother Country	Nominee	

==== Speculative fiction ====
Speculative fiction winners and nominees
Year	Author	Work	Result	Ref.
2023	T. L. Huchu	Our Lady of Mysterious Ailments	Winner	
2023	Tochi Onyebuchi	Goliath	Nominee	
2023	Rita Woods	The Last Dreamwalker	Nominee	

=== Nonfiction ===
==== General nonfiction ====
Nonfiction winners, finalists, and nominees
Year	Author	Work	Result	Ref.
2002	Ken Wiwa	In the Shadow of a Saint: A Son's Journey to Understand His Father's Legacy	Winner	
2002	A'Lelia Bundles	On Her Own Ground: The Life and Times of Madam C. J. Walker	Finalist	
2002	Paul Robeson Jr.	The Undiscovered Paul Robeson: An Artist’s Journey, 1898–1939	Finalist	
2002	Michael Datcher	Raising Fences: A Black Man's Love Story	Nominee	
2002	bell hooks	Salvation: Black People and Love	Nominee	
2002	Dwight McBride	Impossible Witnesses: Truths, Abolitionism, and Slave Testimony	Nominee	
2003	Elizabeth McHenry	Forgotten Readers: Recovering the Lost History of African American Literary Societies	Winner	
2003	Karla FC Holloway	Passed On: African American Mourning Stories	Finalist	
2003	Carole Merritt	The Herndons: An Atlanta Family	Finalist	
2003	Lawrence Jackson	Ralph Ellison: Emergence of Genius	Nominee	
2003	Leon E. Wynter	American Skin: Pop Culture, Big Business, and the End of White America	Nominee	
2004	Wil Haygood	In Black and White: The Life of Sammy Davis, Jr.	Winner	
2004	Lynne Duke	Mandela, Mobutu and Me	Finalist	
2004	E. Patrick Johnson	Appropriating Blackness: Performance and the Politics of Authenticity	Finalist	
2004	Valerie Boyd	Wrapped in Rainbows: The Life of Zora Neale Hurston	Nominee	
2004	Susan Fales-Hill	Always Wear Joy: My Mother Bold and Beautiful	Nominee	
2004	Regina Louise	Somebody's Someone	Nominee	
2005	Alexis De Veaux	Warrior Poet: A Biography of Audre Lorde	Winner	
2005	Debra J. Dickerson	The End of Blackness	Finalist	
2005	Howard French	A Continent for the Taking	Finalist	
2005	Elizabeth Alexander	The Black Interior	Nominee	
2005	Sheryll Cashin	The Failures of Integration: How Race and Class Are Undermining the American Dream	Nominee	
2005	Ellis Cose	Bone to Pick: Of Forgiveness, Reconciliation, Reparation and Revenge	Nominee	
2006	John Hope Franklin	Mirror to America: The Autobiography of John Hope Franklin	Winner	
2006	Donald Bogle	Bright Boulevards, Bold Dreams: The Story of Black Hollywood	Finalist	
2006	Lisa E. Farrington	Creating Their Own Image: The History of African-American Women Artists	Finalist	
2006	Mary Frances Berry	My Face Is Black Is True: Callie House and the Struggle for Ex-Slave Reparations	Nominee	
2006	Dwight A. McBride	Why I Hate Abercrombie & Fitch: Essays on Race and Sexuality	Nominee	
2006	Cheryl A. Wall	Worrying the Line: Black Women Writers, Lineage, and Literary Tradition	Nominee	
2007	Wangari Maathai	Unbowed: A Memoir	Winner	
2007	Louis Chude-Sokei	The Last 'Darky': Bert Williams, Black-on-Black Minstrelsy, and the African Diaspora	Finalist	
2007	Kym Ragusa	The Skin Between Us: A Memoir of Race, Beauty, and Belonging	Finalist	
2007	Christopher John Farley	Before the Legend: The Rise of Bob Marley	Nominee	
2007	Karla F.C. Holloway	BookMarks: Reading in Black and White	Nominee	
2007	Walter C. Rucker	The River Flows On: Black Resistance, Culture, and Identity Formation in Early America	Nominee	
2007	Quincy Troupe	The Architecture of Language	Nominee	
2008	Edwige Danticat	Brother, I'm Dying	Winner	
2008	Sylviane A. Diouf	Dreams of Africa in Alabama: The Slave Ship Clotilda and the Story of the Last Africans Brought to America	Finalist	
2008	Sherrilyn Ifill	On the Courthouse Lawn: Confronting the Legacy of Lynching in the Twenty-first Century	Finalist	
2008	Ayaan Hirsi Ali	Infidel	Nominee	
2008	Jabari Asim	The N Word: Who Can Say It, Who Shouldn’t, and Why	Nominee	
2008	Gerald Horne	The Deepest South: The United States, Brazil and the African Slave Trade	Nominee	
2009	Frank B. Wilderson	Incognegro: A Memoir of Exile and Apartheid	Winner	
2009	Ta-Nehisi Coates	The Beautiful Struggle: A Father, Two Sons, and an Unlikely Road to Manhood	Finalist	
2009	Paula J. Giddings	Ida: A Sword Among Lions: Ida B. Wells and the Campaign Against Lynching	Finalist	
2009	Sheryll Cashin	The Agitator’s Daughter: A Memoir of Four Generations of One Extraordinary African- American Family	Nominee	
2009	Gretchen Holbrook Gerzina	Mr. and Mrs. Prince: How an Extraordinary Eighteenth- Century Family Moved Out of Slavery and into Legend	Nominee	
2009	Marcus Reeves	Somebody Scream: Rap Music's Rise to Prominence in the Aftershock of Black Power	Nominee	
2010	Robin Kelley	Thelonious Monk: The Life and Times of an American Original	Winner	
2010	Betty DeRamus	Freedom by Any Means: True Stories of Cunning and Courage on the Underground Railroad	Finalist	
2010	Wil Haygood	Sweet Thunder: The Life and Times of Sugar Ray Robinson	Finalist	
2010	Gwen Ifill	The Breakthrough: Politics and Race in the Age of Obama	Nominee	
2010	James A. Miller	Remembering Scottsboro: The Legacy of an Infamous Trial	Nominee	
2010	William Julius Wilson	More than Just Race: Being Black and Poor in the Inner City	Nominee	
2011	Isabel Wilkerson	The Warmth of Other Suns: The Epic Story of America’s Great Migration	Winner	
2011	Lawrence Jackson	The Indignant Generation: A Narrative History of African American Writers and Critics, 1934-1960	Finalist	
2011	Rawn James Jr.	Root and Branch: Charles Hamilton Houston, Thurgood Marshall, and the Struggle to End Segregation	Finalist	
2011	Tom Burrell	Brainwashed: Challenging the Myth of Black Inferiority	Nominee	
2011	Thomas Chatterton Williams	Losing My Cool: How a Father's Love and 15,000 Books Beat Hip-hop Culture	Nominee	
2011	Keith Gilyard	John Oliver Killens: A Life of Black Literary Activism	Nominee	
2012	Tomiko Brown-Nagin	Courage to Dissent: Atlanta and the Long History of the Civil Rights Movement	Winner	
2012	Sharifa Rhodes-Pitts	Harlem Is Nowhere: A Journey to the Mecca of Black America	Finalist	
2012	Binyavanga Wainaina	One Day I Will Write About This Place	Finalist	
2012	Melissa V. Harris-Perry	Sister Citizen: Shame, Stereotypes, and Black Women in America	Nominee	
2012	Mark Whitaker	My Long Trip Home: A Family Memoir	Nominee	
2013	Fredrick Harris	The Price of the Ticket: Barack Obama and Rise and Decline of Black Politics	Winner	
2013	Chinua Achebe	There Was a Country: A Personal History of Biafra	Nominee	
2013	Natalie Hopkinson	Go-Go Live: The Musical Life and Death of a Chocolate City	Nominee	
2013	Sara Lawrence-Lightfoot	Exit: The Endings That Set Us Free	Nominee	
2013	Ashraf H. A. Rushdy	American Lynching	Nominee	
2013	Heather Andrea Williams	Help Me To Find My People: The African American Search for Family Lost in Slavery	Nominee	
2014	Craig Wilder	Ebony & Ivory	Winner	
2014	Stanley Crouch	Kansas City Lightning: The Rise and Times of Charlie Parker	Finalist	
2014	Jesmyn Ward	Men We Reaped	Finalist	
2014	Sheri Booker	Nine Years Under: Coming of Age in an Inner-City Funeral Home	Nominee	
2014	William P. Jones	The March on Washington: Jobs, Freedom and the Forgotten History of Civil Rights	Nominee	
2014	Emily Raboteau	Searching for Zion: The Quest for Home in the African Diaspora	Nominee	
2015	Elizabeth Nunez	Not For Everyday Use	Winner	
2015	Charles M. Blow	Fire Shut Up in My Bones	Finalist	
2015	Charles E. Cobb, Jr.	This Nonviolent Stuff'll Get You Killed: How Guns Made the Civil Rights Movement Possible	Finalist	
2015	Danielle Allen	Our Declaration: A Reading of the Declaration of Independence in Defense of Equality	Nominee	
2015	Saladin Ambar	Malcolm X at Oxford Union	Nominee	
2015	Bob Herbert	Losing Our Way	Nominee	
2016	Pamela Newkirk	Spectacle: The Astonishing Life of Ota Benga	Winner	
2016	Elizabeth Alexander	The Light of the World	Finalist	
2016	Gerald Horne	Confronting Black Jacobins: The United States, the Haitian Revolution, and the Origins of the Dominican Republic	Finalist	
2016	Ron Stodghill	Where Everybody Looks Like Me: At the Crossroads of America's Black Colleges and Culture	Nominee	
2016	Harriet A. Washington	Infectious Madness: The Surprising Science of How We Catch Mental Illness	Nominee	
2016	D. Watkins	The Beast Side: Living and Dying While Black in America	Nominee	
2017	Kali Nicole Gross	Hannah Mary Tabbs and the Disembodied Torso: A Tale of Race, Sex, and Violence in America	Winner	
2017	Alondra Nelson	The Social Life of DNA: Race, Reparations, And Reconciliation After the Genome	Finalist	
2017	Christina Sharpe	In the Wake: On Blackness and Being	Finalist	
2017	Patricia Bell-Scott	The Firebrand and the First Lady: Portrait of a Friendship: Pauli Murray, Eleanor Roosevelt, and the Struggle for Social Justice	Nominee	
2017	Ibram X. Kendi	Stamped from the Beginning: The Definitive History of Racist Ideas in America	Nominee	
2017	Gary Younge	Another Day in the Death of America: A Chronicle of Ten Short Lives	Nominee	
2018	Tiya Miles	The Dawn of Detroit: A Chronicle of Slavery and Freedom in the City of the Straits	Winner	
2018	Noliwe Rooks	Cutting School: Privatization, Segregation, and the End of Public Education	Finalist	
2018	Michael W. Twitty	The Cooking Gene: A Journey through African American Culinary History in the Old South	Finalist	
2018	Danielle Allen	Cuz: The Life and Times of Michael A.	Nominee	
2018	Sheryll Cashin	Loving: Interracial Intimacy in America and the Threat to White Supremacy	Nominee	
2018	Camille T. Dungy	Guidebook to Relative Strangers: Journeys into Race, Motherhood, and History	Nominee	
2019	Imani Perry	May We Forever Stand: A History of the Black National Anthem	Winner	
2019	Stephen L. Carter	Invisible: The Forgotten Story of the Black Woman Lawyer Who Took Down America's Most Powerful Mobster	Finalist	
2019	Brittney Cooper	Eloquent Rage: A Black Feminist Discovers Her Superpower	Finalist	
2019	Wil Haygood	Tigerland: 1968–1969 A City Divided, a Nation Torn Apart, and a Magical Season of Healing	Nominee	
2019	Kiese Laymon	Heavy: An American Memoir	Nominee	
2019	Jeffrey C. Stewart	The New Negro: The Life of Alain Locke	Nominee	
2020	Albert Woodfox	Solitary: My Story of Transformation and Hope	Winner	
2020	Clyde Ford	Think Black: A Memoir	Finalist	
2020	Saidiya Hartman	Wayward Lives, Beautiful Experiments: Intimate Histories of Riotous Black Girls, Troublesome Women, and Queer Radicals	Finalist	
2020	Ben Crump	Open Season: Legalized Genocide of Colored People	Nominee	
2020	Dani McClain	We Live for the We: The Political Power of Black Motherhood	Nominee	
2020	Damon Young	What Doesn't Kill You Makes You Blacker: A Memoir in Essays	Nominee	
2021	Marcia Chatelain	Franchise: The Golden Arches in Black America	Winner	
2021	Vincent Brown	Tacky's Revolt: The Story of an Atlantic Slave War	Finalist	
2021	Deirdre Mask	The Address Book: What Street Addresses Reveal About Identity, Race, Wealth, and Power	Finalist	
2021	Ijeoma Oluo	Mediocre: The Dangerous Legacy of White Male America	Nominee	
2021	Ainissa Ramirez	The Alchemy of Us: How Humans and Matter Transformed One Another	Nominee	
2021	Natasha Trethewey	Memorial Drive: A Daughter's Memoir	Nominee	

==== Historical/Social/Political Nonfiction ====
Historical/Social/Political Nonfiction winners and nominees
Year	Author	Title	Result	Ref.
2022	Howard W. French	Born in Blackness	Winner	
2022	Daphne Brooks	Liner Notes for the Revolution: The Intellectual Life of Black Feminist Sound	Nominee	
2022	Mariame Kaba	We Do This Till We Free Us	Nominee	
2023	Mariame Burnham	By Hands Now Known: Jim Crow's Legal Executioners	Winner	
2023	Robert O'Meally	Antagonistic Cooperation: Jazz, Collage, Fiction, and the Shaping of African American Culture	Nominee	
2023	Caleb Gayle	We Refuse to Forget: A True Story of Black Creeks, American Identity, and Power	Nominee	
2023	Winston James	Claude McKay: The Making of a Black Bolshevik	Nominee	

==== Memoir/Biography ====
Memoir/Biography winners and nominees
Year	Author	Title	Result	Ref.
2022	Shanna Greene Benjamin	Half in Shadow: The Life and Legacy of Nellie Y. McKay	Winner	
2022	Farah Jasmine Griffin	Read Until You Understand	Nominee	
2022	Marlon Peterson	Bird Uncaged	Nominee	
2023	Ross Gay	Inciting Joy	Winner	
2023	Taylor Harris	This Boy We Made	Nominee	
2023	D. Watkins	Black Boy Smile	Nominee	
2023	Harrison Mooney	Invisible Boy: A Memoir of Self-Discovery	Nominee	

=== Poetry ===
Poetry winners, finalists, and nominees
Year	Author	Work	Result	Ref.
2007	Patricia Smith	Teahouse of the Almighty	Winner	
2007	Terrance Hayes	Wind in a Box	Finalist	
2007	Quincy Troupe	The Architecture of Language	Finalist	
2008	Kyle G. Dargan	Bouquet of Hungers	Winner	
2008	Remica L. Bingham	Conversion	Nominee	
2008	A. Van Jordan	Quantum Lyrics	Nominee	
2009	Myronn Hardy	The Headless Saints	Winner	
2009	Jericho Brown	Please	Nominee	
2009	Yusef Komunyakaa	Warhorses	Nominee	
2010	Rita Dove	Sonata Mulattica: Poems	Winner	
2010	Haki R. Madhubuti	Liberation Narratives: New and Collected Poems	Winner	
2010	Samiya Bashir	Gospel	Nominee	
2010	Mitchell L. H. Douglas	Cooling Board: A Long-Playing Poem	Nominee	
2011	Elizabeth Alexander	Crave Radiance: New and Selected Poems 1990–2010	Winner	
2011	Terrance Hayes	Lighthead	Nominee	
2011	Thomas Sayers Ellis	Skin, Inc: Identity Repair Poems	Nominee	
2012	Evie Shockley	the new black	Winner	
2012	Aracelis Girmay	Kingdom Animalia	Nominee	
2012	Tracy K. Smith	Life on Mars	Nominee	
2013	Lucille Clifton	The Collected Poems of Lucille Clifton 1965–210	Winner	
2013	Lillian-Yvonne Bertram	But a Storm Is Blowing from Paradise	Nominee	
2013	Monica Hand	me and Nina	Nominee	
2014	Amaud Jamaul Johnson	Darktown Follies	Winner	
2014	Yona Harvey	Hemming the Water	Finalist	
2014	A. Van Jordan	The Cineaste: Poems	Finalist	
2014	Remica L. Bingham	What We Ask of Flesh	Nominee	
2014	Adrian Matejka	The Big Smoke	Nominee	
2014	Carl Phillips	Silverchest	Nominee	
2015	Claudia Rankine	Citizen: An American Lyric	Winner	
2015	Geffrey Davis	Revising the Storm	Finalist	
2015	Roger Reeves	King Me	Finalist	
2015	Brian Gilmore	We Don't Know Any Gangsters	Nominee	
2015	Gregory Pardlo	Digest	Nominee	
2015	Willie Perdomo	The Essential Hits of Shorty Bon Bon	Nominee	
2016	Vievee Francis	Forest Primeval	Winner	
2016	Kyle Dargan	Honest Engine	Finalist	
2016	Ross Gay	Catalog of Unabashed Gratitude	Finalist	
2016	Robin Coste Lewis	Voyage of the Sable Venus	Nominee	
2016	Terrance Hayes	How to Be Drawn	Nominee	
2016	Angela Jackson	It Seems Like a Mighty Long Time	Nominee	
2017	Donika Kelly	Bestiary	Winner	
2017	francine j. harris	play dead	Finalist	
2017	Phillip B. Williams	Thief in the Interior	Finalist	
2017	Ruth Ellen Kocher	Third Voice	Nominee	
2017	Sjohnna McCray	Rapture	Nominee	
2017	Hanif Willis-Abdurraqib	The Crown Ain't Worth Much	Nominee	
2018	Evie Shockley	Semiautomatic	Winner	
2018	Nicole Sealey	Ordinary Beast	Finalist	
2018	Patricia Smith	Incendiary Art	Finalist	
2018	Kwame Dawes	City of Bones	Nominee	
2018	Camille T. Dungy	Trophic Cascade	Nominee	
2018	Shane McCrae	In the Language of My Captor	Nominee	
2019	Terrance Hayes	American Sonnets for My Past and Future Assassin	Winner	
2019	Kwoya Fagin Maples	Mend	Finalist	
2019	Asiya Wadud	Crosslight for Youngbird	Finalist	
2019	Chanda Feldman	Approaching the Fields	Nominee	
2019	Monica A. Hand	DiVida	Nominee	
2019	Marcus Jackson	Pardon My Heart	Nominee	
2020	Ladan Osman	Exiles of Eden	Winner	
2020	t’ai freedom ford	& More Black	Finalist	
2020	Asiya Wadud	Syncope	Finalist	
2020	Geffrey Davis	Night Angler	Nominee	
2020	Eve L. Ewing	1919	Nominee	
2020	Alison Rollins	Library of Small Catastrophes	Nominee	
2021	Rachel Eliza Griffiths	Seeing the Body	Winner	
2021	Tommye Blount	Fantasia for the Man in Blue	Finalist	
2021	Carl Phillips	Pale Colors in a Tall Field	Finalist	
2021	Erica Hunt	Jump the Clock	Nominee	
2021	John Murillo	Kontemporary Amerikan Poetry	Nominee	
2021	Kiki Petrosino	White Blood: A Lyric of Virginia	Nominee	
2022	Shara McCallum	No Ruined Stone	Winner	
2022	Mahogany L. Browne	I Remember Death by Its Proximity to What I Love	Nominee	
2022	Teri Ellen Cross Davis	More Perfect Union	Nominee	
2022	Clemonce Heard	Tragic City	Nominee	
2022	Douglas Kearney	Sho	Nominee	
2022	Yusef Komunyakaa	Everyday Mojo Songs of Earth	Nominee	
2023	Courtney Faye Taylor	Concentrate	Winner	
2023	Cheryl Boyce Taylor	We Are Not Wearing Helmets	Nominee	
2023	Robin Coste Lewis	To the Realization of Perfect Helplessness	Nominee	
2023	Renee Gladman	Plans for Sentences	Nominee	
2023	Isaiah A. Hines	Null Landing	Nominee	
2023	Roger Reeves	Best Barbarian	Nominee	
2024	A Van Jordan	When I Waked, I Cried To Dream Again	Winner	
2024	Amanda Gunn	Things I Didn’t Do With This Body	Finalist	
2024	Patricia Spears Jones	The Beloved Community	Finalist	
2024	Airea Dee Matthews	Bread and Circus	Finalist	
2024	Charif Shanahan	Trace Evidence	Finalist	
2025	Carl Phillips	Scattered Snows to the North	Winner	
	Alison C. Rollins	Black Bell	Finalist	
	Okwudili Nebeolisa	Terminal Maladies	Finalist	
