= NAACP Image Award for Outstanding Literary Work – Debut Author =

Debut literary award from the NAACP

This article lists the winners and nominees for the NAACP Image Award for Outstanding Literary Work, Debut Author.

== Winners and finalists ==
Award winners and finalists
Year	Author	Title	Result	Ref.
2007	Hill Harper	Letters to a Young Brother	Winner	
2007	Lisa Jones Johnson	A Dead Man Speaks	Nominee	
2007	Charlene A. Porter	Boldfaced Lies	Nominee	
2007	Dwight Fryer	The Legend of Quito Road	Nominee	
2007	Bil Carpenter	Uncloudy Days: The Gospel Music Encyclopedia	Nominee	
2008	Victoria Rowell	The Women Who Raised Me: A Memoir	Winner	
2008	Dinaw Mengestu	The Beautiful Things That Heaven Bears	Nominee	
2008	Robin Givens	Grace Will Lead Me Home	Nominee	
2008	Ravi Howard	“Like Trees, Walking”	Nominee	
2008	Ishmael Beah	A Long Way Gone: Memoirs of a Boy Soldier	Nominee	
2009	David Glenn Brown	Barack, Race, and the Media: Drawing My Own Conclusion	Winner	
2010	Reginald Dwayne Betts	A Question of Freedom: A Memoir of Learning, Survival, and Coming of Age in Prison	Winner	
2010	BeNeca Ward	3rd Generation Country	Nominee	
2010	Attica Locke	Black Water Rising	Nominee	
2010	Farai Chideya	Kiss the Sky	Nominee	
2010	Amanda Smyth	Lime Tree Can’t Bear Orange	Nominee	
2011	Isabel Wilkerson	The Warmth of Other Suns: The Epic Story of America’s Great Migration	Winner	
2012	Shirley Strawberry	The Strawberry Letter: Real Talk, Real Advice, Because Bitterness Isn’t Sexy	Winner	
2012	Denise Hall Brown	2Grieve 2Gether: A Journal from the Heart Helping Survivors and Supporters Navigate the Healing Process	Nominee	
2012	Justin Torres	We the Animals	Nominee	
2012	Patricia Duncan	Defining Moment: Barack Obama: The Historical Journey to 1600 Pennsylvania Avenue	Nominee	
2012	Shella Gillus	The Loom	Nominee	
2013	Darryl L. Lacy	Nikki G: A Portrait of Nikki Giovanni in Her Own Words	Winner	
2013	Mayi Ngwala and Allain Ngwala	Congo: Spirit of Darkness (Volume 1)	Nominee	
2013	R. Kayeen Thomas	Antebellum	Nominee	
2013	Sonia Jackson Myles	The Sister Accord: 51 Ways to Love Your Sister	Nominee	
2013	Yvvette Edwards	A Cupboard Full of Coats	Nominee	
2014	Sheri Booker	Nine Years Under	Winner	
2014	Hannah Weyer	On the Come Up: A Novel, Based on a True Story	Nominee	
2014	Jason Mott	The Returned	Nominee	
2014	Taiye Selasi	Ghana Must Go	Nominee	
2015	Dwayne Alexander Smith	Forty Acres	Winner	
2015	Darrell Miller	The 16th Minute of Fame: An Insider’s Guide for Maintaining Success Beyond 15 Minutes of Fame	Nominee	
2015	Morowa Yejide	Time of the Locust	Nominee	
2015	Natalie Baszile	Queen Sugar	Nominee	
2015	Toni Ann Johnson	Remedy for a Broken Angel	Nominee	
2016	Chigozie Obioma	The Fishermen	Winner	
2016	Angela Flournoy	The Turner House	Nominee	
2016	April Ryan	The Presidency in Black and White: My Up-Close View of Three Presidents and Race in America	Nominee	
2016	Naomi Jackson	The Star Side of Bird Hill	Nominee	
2016	Wendell Pierce and Rod Dreher	The Wind in the Reeds: A Storm, A Play, and the City That Would Not Be Broken	Nominee	
2017	Trevor Noah	Born a Crime: Stories from a South African Childhood	Winner	
2017	Lisa Fenn	Carry On	Nominee	
2017	Nicole Gonzalez Van Cleve	Crook County: Racism and Injustice in America's Largest Criminal Court	Nominee	
2017	Natashia Deón	Grace	Nominee	
2017	Cory Booker	United: Thoughts on Finding Common Ground and Advancing the Common Good	Nominee	
2018	Stephanie Powell Watts	No One Is Coming to Save Us	Winner	
2018	Devin Allen	A Beautiful Ghetto	Nominee	
2018	Leland Melvin	Chasing Spaces: An Astronaut’s Story of Grit, Grace & Second Chances	Nominee	
2018	Patricia Williams, with Jeannine Amber	Rabbit: The Autobiography of Ms. Pat	Nominee	
2018	Gabrielle Union	We're Going to Need More Wine	Nominee	
2019	David Mann and Shaun Sanders	Us Against the World: Our Secrets to Love, Marriage, and Family	Winner	
2019	Gaël Faye	Small Country	Nominee	
2019	Janet Dewart Bell	Lighting the Fires of Freedom: African American Women in the Civil Rights Movement	Nominee	
2019	Nafissa Thompson-Spires	Heads of the Colored People (paperback)	Nominee	
2019	Sheila Brooks and Clint C. Wilson II	Lucile H. Bluford and the Kansas City Call: Activist Voice for Social Justice	Nominee	
2020	Hal Banfield	I Am Dance: Words and Images of the Black Dancer	Winner	
2020	Erica Campbell	More Than Pretty: Doing the Soul Work That Uncovers Your True Beauty	Nominee	
2020	Lauren Wilkinson	American Spy	Nominee	
2020	Joanne Ramos	The Farm	Nominee	
2020	Kiley Reid	Such a Fun Age	Nominee	
2021	Elijah E. Cummings	We’re Better Than This: My Fight for the Future of Our Democracy	Winner	
2021	Brittany K. Barnett	A Knock at Midnight	Nominee	
2021	Cole Brown	Greyboy: Finding Blackness in a White World	Nominee	
2021	Megan Giddings	Lakewood	Nominee	
2021	Walter Thompson-Hernández	The Compton Cowboys	Nominee	
2022	Cicely Tyson	Just As I Am	Winner	
2022	Katherine Johnson	My Remarkable Journey	Nominee	
2022	Zakiya Dalila Harris	The Other Black Girl	Nominee	
2022	Honorée Fanonne Jeffers	The Love Songs of W.E.B. Du Bois	Nominee	
2022	Rebecca Hall	Wake: The Hidden History of Women-Led Slave Revolts	Nominee	
2023	George McCalman	Illustrated Black History: Honoring the Iconic and the Unseen	Winner	
2023	Boyah J. Farah	America Made Me a Black Man	Nominee	
2023	Ekemini Uwan, Christina Edmondson, and Michelle Higgins	Truth’s Table: Black Women’s Musings on Life, Love, and Liberation	Nominee	
2023	Kai Harris	What the Fireflies Knew	Nominee	
2023	Kevin Fredericks and Melissa Fredericks	Marriage Be Hard: 12 Conversations to Keep You Laughing, Loving, and Learning with Your Partner	Nominee	
2024	Krystle Zara Appiah	Rootless	Winner	
2024	Ani Kayode Somtochukwu	And Then He Sang a Lullaby	Nominee	
2024	Kim Coleman Foote	Coleman Hill	Nominee	
2024	Kleaver Cruz	The Black Joy Project	Nominee	
2024	Breanne McIvor	The God of Good Looks	Nominee	
2025	Sarai Johnson	Grown Woman	Winner	
2025	Uche Okonkwo	A Kind of Madness	Nominee	
2025	Shirley Neal	AfroCentric Style: A Celebration of Blackness & Identity in Pop Culture	Nominee	
2025	O.O. Sangoyomi	Masquerade	Nominee	
2025	Essie Chambers	Swift River	Nominee	
2026	Charles B. Fancher	Red Clay	Winner	
2026	Anela Malik	American Soul: The Black History of Food in the United States	Nominee	
2026	Dr. Judith Joseph	High Functioning: Overcome Your Hidden Depression and Reclaim Your Joy	Nominee	
2026	Lorna Lewis	A Sky Full of Love	Nominee	
2026	Zoe B. Wallbrook	History Lessons	Nominee	
