= The Darkest Child =

Novel by Delores Phillips

The Darkest Child is the first novel by writer Delores Phillips, published in 2004. The book is set in Georgia in the late 1950s, when Jim Crow laws enforced segregation in the American South, and is written from the perspective of a black woman. The main character is Rozelle Quinn, a mother of ten children who works as a domestic servant for a family she does not like.

In 2005, Phillips was awarded the First Novelist Award for The Darkest Child. She was a Hurston/Wright Legacy Award Finalist in 2005, and won the Black Caucus of the ALA Award.

== Background ==
The novel follows the narrative of the child Tangy Quinn. She tells the story of the abuse that her and her siblings face from their mother Rozelle, and the events of their town that include lynchings, rape and labor. The novel contrasts the pursuit of education for African American youths versus the necessity of labor in their large family. While the two eldest boys in the family perform physical labor each day, Rozelle forces several of her daughters to go to "the farmhouse" far from home where they receive money in return for sexual acts.

The novel was originally called "Gussie Mae Potts" and was a 500-page poem before it became the book that was published in 2004. Though the poem was written in 1997, the novel was written during 2001-2003 and then titled "To Swallow the Devil Whole" before the name was changed and published by Soho Press. The Darkest Child's sequel is among the collection of Phillips' writing in her second novel, Stumbling Blocks.

Phillips' main inspiration was the consideration of the things that children would have undergone living in the South before child protection laws existed.

== Plot ==
The Darkest Child begins in Georgia with Rozelle Quinn and her 13-year-old daughter, Tangy Mae, who live on Penyon Road. Rozelle lives there with her 9 children, who are the subject of her abuse. Tangy Mae's main interest is in educating herself, while all of her elder siblings no longer attend school so that they can work to bring income to the household. Mushy is the eldest of Rozelle's children and is the only one of the siblings not living in the house at the commencement of the novel. The other children's names are Harvey, Sam, Tarabelle, Martha Jean, Tangy Mae, Laura, Wallace, Edna and Judy.

The book opens with Rozelle having Tangy Mae write a note to her employer that she will no longer be cleaning house for them and that Tangy Mae will be taking her place as she is dying. She then goes into labor and is taken to the hospital for several weeks. When she returns, she brings a daughter and says that her name is Judy before leaving to seemingly go party.

In a short chapter, Tangy Mae and Martha Jean are teaching Edna and Laura to jump rope when Rozelle comes out onto the porch holding Judy and throws her into the gully behind the house. Martha Jean runs under the house and attempts to catch her. She then climbs into the gully and comes out holding Judy's corpse. When the police and doctor arrive to the scene, Martha Jean refuses to release Judy's body to be examined to determine whether she is alive or dead. Only after the doctor threatens to sedate her, and her brothers and Chad Lowe (a character that acts like the law but holds no lawful power) start to butt heads over her, does Velman Cooper manage to convince her to relinquish her hold. The baby is declared dead and Rozelle, who had been apathetic until the arrival of a crowd, falls into hysterics.

Tangy Mae is forced to start going to the farmhouse by her mother. It is after she is beaten severely and walking out of the farmhouse that she is seen by her father, Crow. He stays in town to make sure that her back heals up then leaves without saying goodbye. One night, Rozelle leaves the house to go to the farmhouse and returns wearing only a sheet and covered in blood. She crashes the car in the back yard and has Tangy Mae draw her a bath to wash the blood off, then spends the night in the bathtub. The blood is not her own and she tells Miss Pearl in the morning that Junior Fess crawled through the window of the room at the farmhouse and killed the man that she was sleeping with, the same that had beaten Tangy Mae. She then enter a non-responsive state and is taken away by the police and placed in a mental institution.

Crow later turns up to tell Tangy Mae that he was the one that killed the man at the farmhouse for having beaten Tangy Mae.

Rozelle returns from her brief stint in the mental institution and goes to stay with Mushy, Tangy Mae and Laura. Tarabelle claims to take Rozelle for a picnic, but when Laura tells her sisters that there were only kerosene lamps and matches in the picnic basket, Mushy drives them over to Penyon road to find their old house in flames, Tarabelle inside and Rozelle alive outside. Rozelle later admits to Mushy that she lit the fire with a match and left Tarabelle inside intentionally. The novel ends with Tangy Mae taking her sister Laura and boarding a bus to leave the town. Upon their departure she sees their mother wandering by the railroad tracks.

== Major themes ==
=== Deafness ===
Deafness is largely explored through the character of Martha Jean. As the sole deaf character in the novel, she not only develops a method of sign language with her siblings, but furthers the development of her signing with Velman Cooper in order to be able to communicate on a deeper level. Rozelle's referral to her as the "dummy", exemplifies how a common viewpoint of deaf individuals in the 1950s was that they were developmentally inferior in addition to their deafness, because of an inability to hear or communicate verbally. Furthermore, Rozelle's relegation of Martha Jean to household duties and the care of her younger siblings portrays the conventional attitude that people with hearing impediments were only capable of close-to-home physical labor.

== Publication ==
- The Darkest Child. New Edition with introduction by Tayari Jones. Soho Press, 2018. ISBN 978-1-61695-872-5
- The Darkest Child. Soho Press, 2005. ISBN 978-1-56947-378-8
