= Fredrick C. Harris =

American political scientist

- Awards: Hurston/Wright Legacy Award for Nonfiction (2013)

Academic background
- Education: University of Georgia (BA); Northwestern University (PhD)

Academic work
- Discipline: American politics
- Institutions: University of Rochester; Columbia University

Fredrick Cornelius Harris is an American political scientist specializing in African American politics. He is the Class of 1933 Professor of Political Science and former Dean of Faculty for Social Sciences at Columbia University. He also serves as Director of the Center on African-American Politics and Society at Columbia.

== Biography ==
Harris received his B.A. from the University of Georgia and Ph.D. from Northwestern University. He taught at the University of Rochester from 1994 until joining the Columbia University faculty in 2007. Harris' research focuses on political participation, social movements, the intersection of race and religion and politics, and African American politics.

Harris is a recipient of the Hurston/Wright Legacy Award for Nonfiction in 2013 for his book The Price of the Ticket: Barack Obama and Rise and Decline of Black Politics. Harris argued that Barack Obama became the first African American President by denying that he was the candidate of African Americans, thereby downplaying many of the social justice issues that are central to black political movements.

Harris is a non-resident Senior Fellow at the Brookings Institution and served as Vice President of the American Political Science Association. He was a visiting scholar at the Russell Sage Foundation between 1998 and 1999.

== Works ==
- The Price of the Ticket: Barack Obama and Rise and Decline of Black Politics (2012)
