= Calvin Baker =

American novelist, essayist, and editor

- Born: 1972 (age 53–54); Chicago, Illinois, U.S.
- Education: University of Chicago Laboratory Schools; Amherst College
- Occupations: Novelist; educator; essayist; editor

Calvin Baker (born 1972) is an American novelist, educator, essayist, and editor who has chronicled the African-American experience from the colonial era to the present, centering the Black voice and perspective within the context of trans-Atlantic history. Among his concerns are constructions of American identity, cosmopolitanism, post-colonialism, modernity, geography, and science. His work is often praised for its expansiveness and richness of language. He has taught at Yale College, Skidmore College, and Columbia University's Graduate Center for the Arts.

== Biography ==
Born in Chicago, Baker attended the University of Chicago Lab Schools and graduated in 1994 from Amherst College, where he received his degree in English with highest honors in the major.

His first novel, Naming the New World (1998), was sold to A Wyatt Books for St. Martin's Press when he was 23. The novel begins in Africa before contact with Europe and ends in recent America. The narrative employs postmodern techniques to unify a single consciousness across time. It was hailed by numerous publications, including Time magazine, as the beginning of a major new voice in American letters.

His second novel, Once Two Heroes (2003), employs a dual narrative structure, one white, one black, to explore the mid-century connection between America and Europe and 20th-century violence through the prism of World War II and the American phenomenon of racial lynching.

His third novel, Dominion (2006), is concerned with the promise and potentialities of pre-Revolutionary America, the birth of a racial caste system, and the ghost of loss that haunted the early settlers both black and white.

Grace, published in 2015, is concerned with the intersection of interior identity and geography, the interplay of logical and emotional systems, and the tension between public and private selves.

In 2020, Baker's first nonfiction book, A More Perfect Reunion: Race, Integration, and the Future of America, was published by Bold Type Books.

Esquire named him one of the best young writers in America in 2005. Dominion was a finalist for the Hurston/Wright Award as well as one of Newsday's Best Books of the Year. His work has been widely acclaimed by critics as well as writers as diverse as Joseph O'Neill, Junot Díaz, Jeffery Renard Allen, Francisco Goldman, Dale Peck, Maud Newton, and Hannah Tinti. Peck, widely known for his critical takedowns, has called Baker one of his favorite living writers, saying of Grace: "He works in a rarefied strain of literature whose practitioners include Faulkner, Morrison, Calvino and Cormac McCarthy." Newton has praised Baker's Dominion for "richness of language that recalls the King James."

In 2017 Baker teamed with Peck and publisher John Oakes to relaunch the Evergreen Review, the literary journal founded by Barney Rosset, which was influential in bringing attention to writers such as Samuel Beckett, Jean-Paul Sartre, Vladimir Nabokov, Edward Albee, and Leroi Jones.

Early in his career Baker worked as a journalist at the New Orleans Times-Picayune, Time Inc., and The Village Voice. His work has also appeared in Harper's Magazine and The New York Times Magazine. His longform piece, Notes for a Spanish Odyssey, about race and migration in Spain, was published as a Kindle Single with Amazon, and is part of the New York Public Library's permanent digital collection.

He has taught in the English department at Yale, Columbia University's MFA program, and the American studies department at the University of Leipzig, Germany. He also co-founded the digital content platform ScrollMotion, with Josh Koppel and John Lema. Baker lives in Saratoga Springs, New York.

== Bibliography ==
- A More Perfect Reunion. Bold Type Books, 2020. ISBN 978-1-56858-923-7.
- Grace. Tyrus Books, 2015. ISBN 978-1-440-58575-3.
- Dominion. Grove Press. 2006. ISBN 0-8021-4309-1.
- Once Two Heroes. Viking, 2003. ISBN 978-0-670-03164-1.
- Naming the New World. St. Martin's Press, 1998. ISBN 978-0-312-18140-6.
