= D. Watkins =

American author and professor

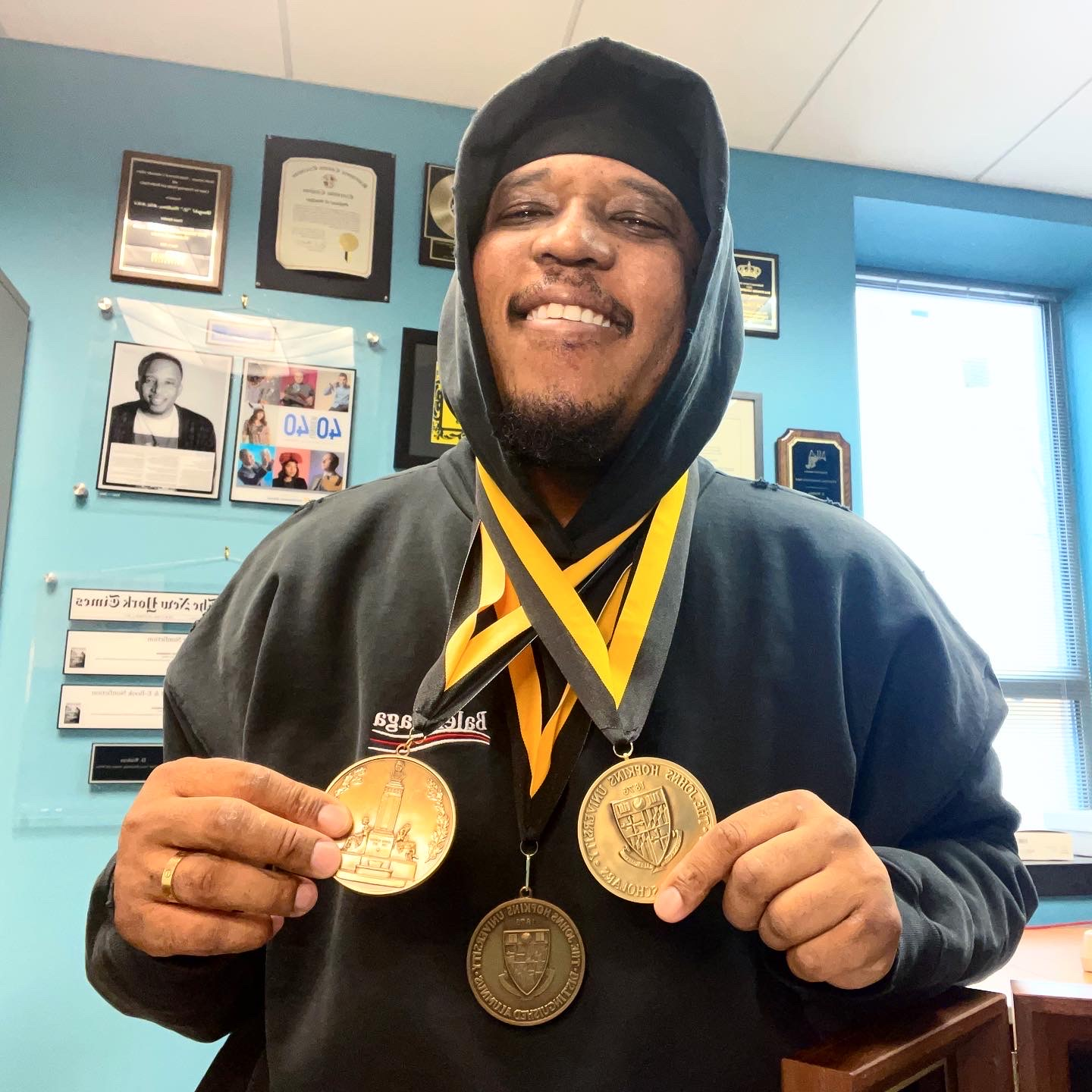
- Watkins in December 2022
- Born: Baltimore, Maryland, U.S.
- Education: Johns Hopkins University (M.Ed); Johns Hopkins University (Cert); University of Baltimore (MFA)
- Spouse: Caron Brace
- Children: Cross Watkins
- Writing career
- Notable works: The Beastside: Living (and Dying) While Black in America (2015); The Cook Up: A Crack Rock Memoir (2016); Black Boy Smile: A Memoir in Moments (2022)

Dwight "D." or "Doc" Watkins (born February 10) is an author, HBO writer, and professor at The University of Baltimore.

Watkins is a professor at the University of Baltimore and New York Times bestselling author from East Baltimore.

== Early life and education ==
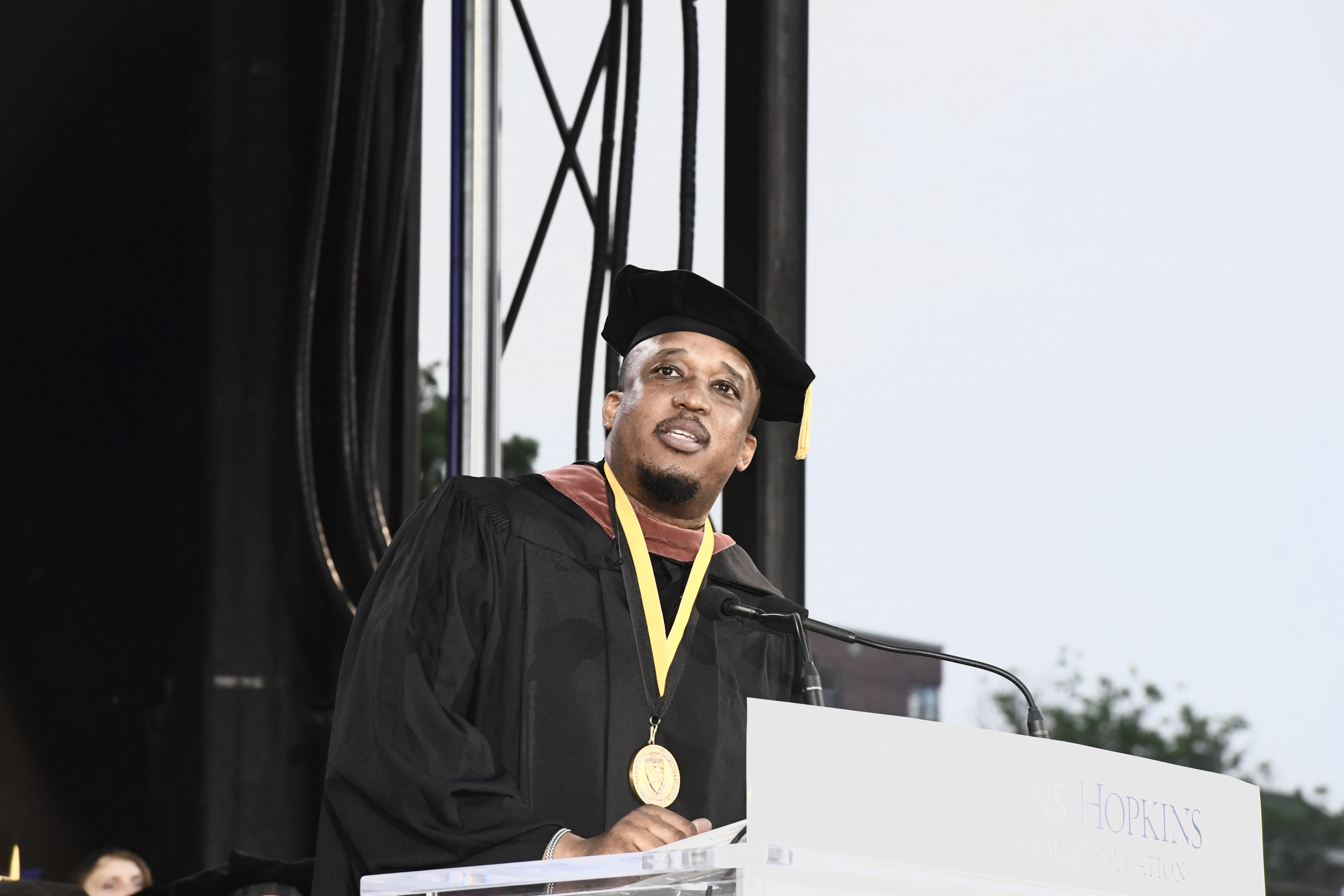
Watkins speaking at Johns Hopkins University in Baltimore in 2022

Watkins attended Paul Laurence Dunbar High School. At eighteen, after losing his brother and best friend, Watkins began to use and sell narcotics. After a handful of "fateful encounters", he used his illicit profits to buy a bar. Watkins beat addiction, the streets and graduated from Johns Hopkins University, which inducted him into its prestigious Society of Scholars and named him a Distinguished Alumnus. He married lawyer Caron Brace in August 2019. In 2020, Watkins won City Lit's Dambach Award for literary service. In 2021 Watkins received the MLA William Wilson Maryland Author Award. Watkins is the writer of Carmelo Anthony's bestselling memoir Where Tomorrows Aren't Promised: A Memoir of Survival and Hope and staff writer on David Simon's HBO miniseries We Own This City.

Watkins holds a Masters in Education from Johns Hopkins University, and an MFA in creative writing from University of Baltimore.

In 2024 Watkins was named a Gordon Parks Fellow. He also won a James Beard Media award for his Salon essay “Navigating the new sober boom, where a person’s sobriety is as unique as their fingerprint,” in addition to a Vernon Jarrett Medal for Journalistic Excellence.

== Career ==
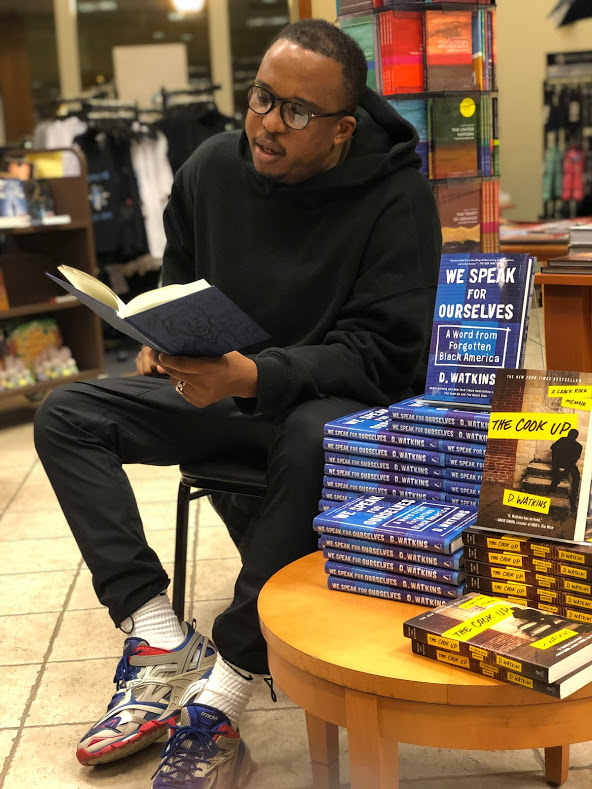
Watkins doing a live reading in Baltimore in October 2019

=== The Beastside: Living (and Dying) While Black in America ===
Watkins first book, The Beastside: Living (and Dying) While Black in America was published in 2015 under David Talbot and Skyhorse Publishing's investigative book imprint, Hot Books. The Beast Side tells a tale of two Baltimores, taking an in-depth look at systemic racism and the failure of the education system, particularly for black men. In 2016, The Beastside was a Hurston/Wright Legacy Award nominee.

=== The Cook Up: A Crack Rock Memoir ===
The Cook Up: A Crack Rock Memoir, published in 2016 by Grand Central Publishing, is a memoir that details the operations of a drug empire following Watkins' brother Bip's death, his acceptance to college, and the struggle to leave the trade behind. It was named as an editor's pick by The New York Times in May 2016. Kirkus Reviews described the book as "A familiar story to fans of The Wire, but Watkins provides a gritty, vivid first-person document of a desperate demographic." In 2017, The Cook Up was a Books for a Better Life Award Finalist.

=== We Speak For Ourselves ===
We Speak For Ourselves is Watkins' third book, published in April 2019 by Atria is a collection of essays showcasing black voices in east Baltimore. We Speak For Ourselves was the 2020 selection for the Enoch Pratt Free Library "One Book Baltimore".

=== Where Tomorrow's Aren't Promised ===
Where Tomorrows Aren't Promised was published by Gallery Books in 2021. Watkins teamed up with NBA superstar Carmelo Anthony to document his journey from the gritty streets of Red Hook, Brooklyn and West Baltimore to the NBA. Kirkus writes "Many sports memoirs start with an origin story, but this one is more thought-provoking than one might expect. Kudos to Watkins, who shapes the narrative and rhythm without stepping on Anthony’s voice."

=== Black Boy Smile: A Memoir in Moments ===
Black Boy Smile was published in 2022 by Legacy Lit, a subsidiary of Hachette Books. Winner of the 2022 Paris Book Award for General Nonfiction, the book details Watkins's journey through the lens of masculinity in combination with his attempt to unlearn harmful toxic traits. Poet Nikki Giovanni praised Black Boy Smile, saying "This is a book all young men should read." Black Boy Smile received starred reviews from both Booklist, which named the book as a top ten memoir of 2022 and Kirkus Reviews, which ranked the book amongst the best nonfiction books and best books about Black life released in 2022, calling the work "A startling and moving celebration of a brutal life transformed by language and love."

Black Boy Smile was listed as one of New York Public Library's best books for adults in 2022. Shelf Awareness named it one of the best books of the year, and Aspire TV followed by listing the book as one of its top five celebrity memoirs of the year.

=== The Wire: The Complete Visual History ===
The Wire: The Complete Visual History was published in 2022 by Insight Edition and distributed by Simon and Schuster. After the success of HBO's We Own This City, Watkins and The Wire creator David Simon collaborated on this retrospective of the critically-acclaimed show.

=== Salon ===
Watkins was editor at large for the online magazine, Salon.
