= Kyle Dargan =

American poet

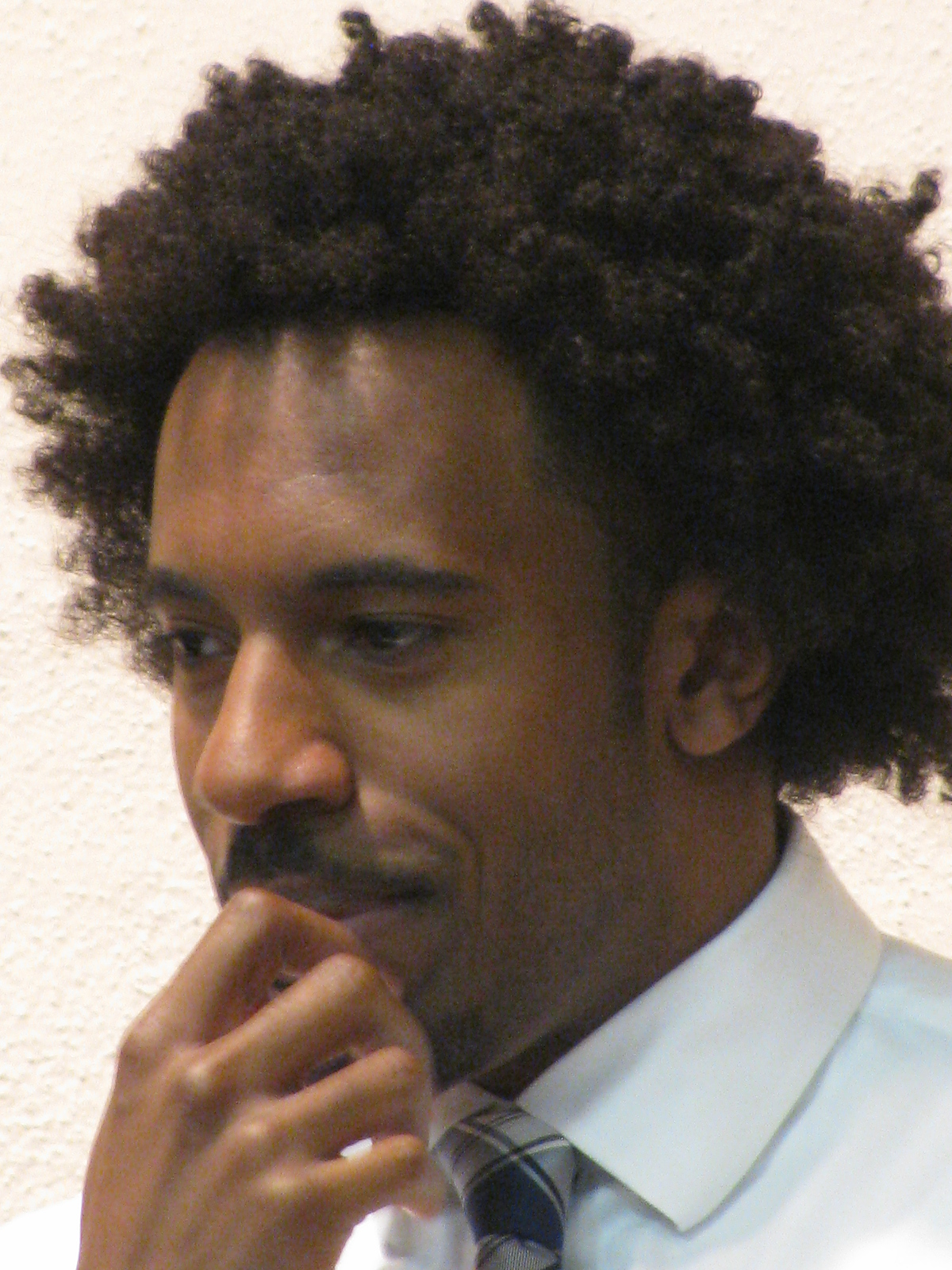
- Born: Newark, New Jersey, U.S.
- Education: University of Virginia; Indiana University Bloomington
- Occupations: Editor, Poet, teacher
- Writing career
- Notable works: Anagnorisis, Honest Engine, The Listening
- Notable awards: Cave Canem Prize; Lenore Marshall Poetry Prize; Hurston/Wright Legacy Award
- Website: www.american-boi.com

Kyle Dargan is an American writer and editor. He is the author of six poetry collections. Dargan is currently an associate professor of literature and the assistant director of creative writing at American University, as well as Books Editor for the Wondaland Arts Society.

== Biography ==
Dargan was born in Newark, New Jersey. He received a Bachelor of Arts from the University of Virginia and Master of Fine Arts from Indiana University Bloomington.

Dargan's first four poetry collections were published by University of Georgia Press. His first collection, The Listening (2004), was the recipient of the Cave Canem Poetry Prize in 2004. His second collection, Bouquet of Hungers (2007), was awarded the Hurston/Wright Legacy Award in poetry in 2008. "Logorrhea Dementia" was published in 2010 and Honest Engine was published in 2015. Dargan's fifth book, Anagnorisis, (Triquarterly, 2018), won the Lenore Marshall Poetry Prize from the Academy of American Poets in 2018.

Dargan is currently an associate professor of literature and the assistant director of creative writing at American University. He is the founder and editor of POST NO ILLS magazine. Dargan lives in Washington D.C.

== Selected publications ==
- The Listening, (University of Georgia Press, 2004) ISBN 978-0820326610
- Bouquet of Hungers, (University of Georgia Press, 2007) ISBN 978-0820330310
- Logorrhea Dementia: A Self-Diagnosis, (University of Georgia Press, 2010) ISBN 978-0820336848
- Honest Engine, (University of Georgia Press, 2015) ISBN 978-0820347288
- Anagnorisis, (Northwestern University Press, 2018) ISBN 978-0810137844
- Panzer Herz, A Live Dissection, (Northwestern University Press, 2023) ISBN 978-0810145689

== Awards ==
- 2003 — Cave Canem Poetry Prize, The Listening
- 2008 — Hurston/Wright Legacy Award in Poetry, Bouquet of Hungers
- 2019 — Lenore Marshall Poetry Prize, Anagnorisis
