= Curdella Forbes =

Jamaican academic and writer

- Born: Curdella Forbes; Colony of Jamaica, British Empire
- Education: University of the West Indies (PhD)
- Occupations: Novelist, nonfiction writer, professor, academic
- Writing career
- Genre: Literary fiction
- Notable awards: Hurston/Wright Legacy Award

Curdella Forbes is a Jamaican academic and author, winner of the Hurston/Wright Legacy Award for Fiction for A Tall History of Sugar.

== Life and career ==
Forbes has been professor of Caribbean literature at Howard University since 2004 after working at the University of the West Indies, Mona, which was where she also received her doctorate in 2000. She has also been writer in residence at University of the West Indies, Mona.

== Selected works ==
=== Novels ===
- Songs of Silence (2002) ISBN 9780435989576
- Flying With Icarus And Other Stories (2003)ISBN 9780744590678
- A Permanent Freedom (2008)ISBN 9781845230616
- Ghosts: A Memoir (2014)ISBN 9781845232009
- A Tall History of Sugar (2019)ISBN 9781617757518

=== Non-fiction ===
- Revisiting Samuel Selvon's Trilogy of Exile: Implications for Gender Consciousness and Gender Relations in Caribbean Culture (1997)
- Tropes of the Carnivalesque: Hermaphroditic Gender as Identity in Slave Society and in West Indian Fictions (1999)
- Through the Lens of Gender: A Revisionary Reading of the Novels of Samuel Selvon and George Lamming (2000)
- Shakespeare, Other Shakespeares and West Indian Popular Culture: A Reading of the Erotics of Errantry and Rebellion in 'Troilus and Cressida (2001)
- The End of Nationalism?: Performing the Question in Benítez-Rojo's 'The Repeating Island' and Glissant's 'Poetics of Relation' (2002)
- Selling That Caribbean Woman Down the River: Diasporic Travel Narratives and the Global Economy (2005)
- Fracturing Subjectivities: International Space and the Discourse of Individualism in Colin Channer's 'Waiting in Vain' and Jamaica Kincaid's 'Mr. Potter' (2008)
- "Trespassers Will Be Persecuted": Reading Migratory Subjectivities in Maryse Condé's 'Heremakhonon' and Perambulatory Chain Emails (2010)
- Between Plot and Plantation, Trespass and Transgression: Caribbean Migratory Disobedience in Fiction and Internet Traffic (2012)
