= Ladan Osman =

Somali-American poet and teacher

Ladan Osman لادان عثمان
- Born: Mogadishu, Somalia
- Education: University of Texas at Austin
- Occupations: Poet, director
- Notable work: Exiles of Eden (2019); The Kitchen Dweller's Testimony (2015)
- Awards: Hurston/Wright Legacy Award (2020); Whiting Award (2021)

Ladan Osman (Somali: Laadan Cismaan, Arabic: لادان عثمان) is a Somali-American poet, director, and photographer. Her poetry is centered on themes of dislocation and migration, and has been published in a number of prominent literary magazines. In 2014, she was awarded the annual Sillerman First Book Prize for her collection The Kitchen Dweller's Testimony. In 2020, she was awarded the Hurston/Wright Legacy Award for her collection Exiles of Eden. She was awarded a 2021 Whiting Award for her poetry.

== Personal life ==
Osman was born in Mogadishu, Somalia, and grew up in Columbus, Ohio in the United States.

Osman studied at the University of Texas at Austin's Michener Center for Writers, where she obtained an MFA.

Additionally, Osman has received fellowships from the Fine Arts Work Center, Union League Civic & Arts Foundation, Cave Canem Foundation, and Michener Center for Writers.

== Career ==
Osman is an artist by profession.

Her verse has been featured in a number of poetry publications, including Academy of American Poets, Narrative Magazine, Literary Hub, and Prairie Schooner. Her poems have also appeared in former US Poet Laureate Ted Kooser's syndicated newspaper column, "American Life in Poetry".

Her chapbook, Ordinary Heaven, was released in March 2014. Her first full-length collection, The Kitchen-Dweller's Testimony, was published in 2015 and was decorated with the Sillerman First Book Prize for African Poets.

Her photographs, performances and experimental media have been exhibited by Jenkins Johnson Gallery, Bienal de São Paulo, Fotogalerie Friedrichshain, Haus der Kulturen der Welt, Arts Incubator, and the New York African Film Festival

== Awards ==
In February 2014, Osman was named the winner of the annual Sillerman First Book Prize for African Poets for her collection The Kitchen Dweller's Testimony. The $1000 award was accompanied by the publication of her poetry anthology by the University of Nebraska Press in conjunction with Amalion Press.

In October 2020, Osman won a Hurston/Wright Legacy Award for her second collection Exiles of Eden.

In April 2021, Osman received a Whiting Award.

Osman was awarded and ECU Award for Best Independent Documentary, and a Dikalo Award for Best Short Documentary.
