= Tracy Price-Thompson =

American novelist

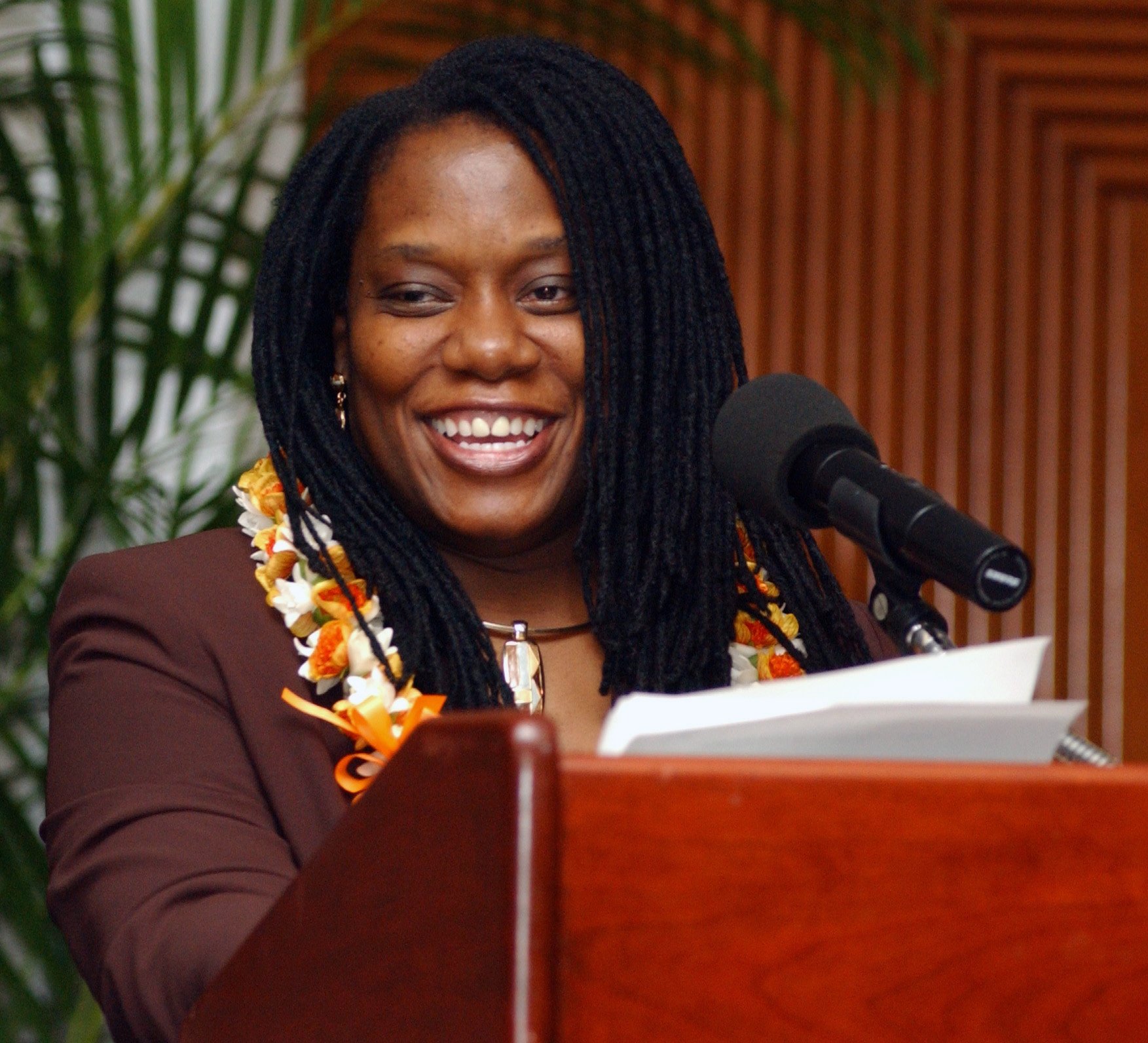
- Born: 1963 (age 62–63); Brooklyn, New York, U.S.
- Education: Rutgers University
- Occupation: Author

Tracy Price-Thompson (born 1963) is an American speaker, novelist, editor, and retired United States Army Engineer Officer. She is a decorated veteran of the Gulf War.

== Early life and education ==
Tracy Price-Thompson was born and raised in Brooklyn, New York. She is the former Editor-in-Chief of NoireMagazine.com, and a former book reviewer for QBR: The Quarterly Black Review. She holds an undergraduate degree in business, and a master's degree in social work. She is a Ralph Bunche graduate Fellow at Rutgers University.

== Career ==
She is the CEO of Versatile Voices Entertainment Group and a member of Delta Sigma Theta sorority.

Price-Thompson self-published her first novel, Black Coffee, at the age of 37. It was quickly bought by Random House imprint, Striver's Row, as part of an unprecedented three-book, six-figure deal, and became a bestseller.

She has since published five other novels: Chocolate Sangria, A Woman's Worth, Knockin' Boots, Gather Together in My Name and 1-900-A-N-Y-T-I-M-E.

Price-Thompson's novel, A Woman's Worth, which illuminated the practice of female genital mutilation (FGM) in Africa, won the 2005 Hurston/Wright Legacy Award for Contemporary Fiction.

Price-Thompson went on to publish another weighty, socially conscious novel in Gather Together in My Name, which highlighted racial profiling, prosecutorial corruption, and the disproportionate application of the death penalty for minorities in the criminal justice system.

Price-Thompson's short memoir, "Bensonhurst: Black and Then Blue", published in Simon & Schuster’s anthology series Children of the Dream: Our Stories of Growing Up Black in America, describes her experiences as a young black child helping to integrate the public schools of New York City. The work is encapsulated in the Library of The National Humanities Center in The Making of African American Identity Volume III under the theme "Overcome?"

Price-Thompson's non-fiction credits also include:

- "We of One Blood" in Chicken Soup for the African American Soul
- "Black Love, At Its Best" in It’s All Love: Black Writers on Soul Mates, Family and Friends.
- "Get Your Own Dungeon" in A Letter for My Mother

Price-Thompson has edited three anthologies of fiction including, Proverbs for the People, published by Kensington Publishers, which was the first major collection of Black fiction since Terry McMillan's Breaking Ice.

She also edited and contributed to two volumes in the Sister4Sister Empowerment Series: Other People's Skin, with stories that sought to acknowledge, examine, and heal the "skin/hair thang" between Black women; and My Blue Suede Shoes, which empowered victims of domestic violence to walk away from abusive environments. Price-Thompson's title story in the collection Other People's Skin, also won a Hurston/Wright Award for short fiction.

Her short fiction credits include:

- "Killer", in Twilight Moods, edited by Nancey Flowers
- "Shared Heat", in Best Black Women’s Erotica 2, edited by Samiya Bashir
- "The African in the American" in Brown Sugar 3 When Opposites Attract edited by Carol Taylor
- "The Stranger" in Breaking the Cycle, edited by NYT Bestselling author Zane
- "Hawaii Five-Oh!", in Wanderlust: Erotic Travel Tales, edited by Carol Taylor
- Indecent Exposure, with Victor McGlothin and Carmen Green
- On The Line, edited by Donna Hill

Price-Thompson wrote and produced the stage play Colored Girls, adapted from the choreopoem For Colored Girls Who Have Considered Suicide When the Rainbow is Enuf by Ntozake Shange.

Her keynote speeches include "On Writing" at the Claude Brown Writing Workshop in Washington, DC, and "The Niagara Project" in Honolulu, Hawaii.

Price-Thompson served as a judge on the 2007 Hurston/Wright Legacy Award Panel.

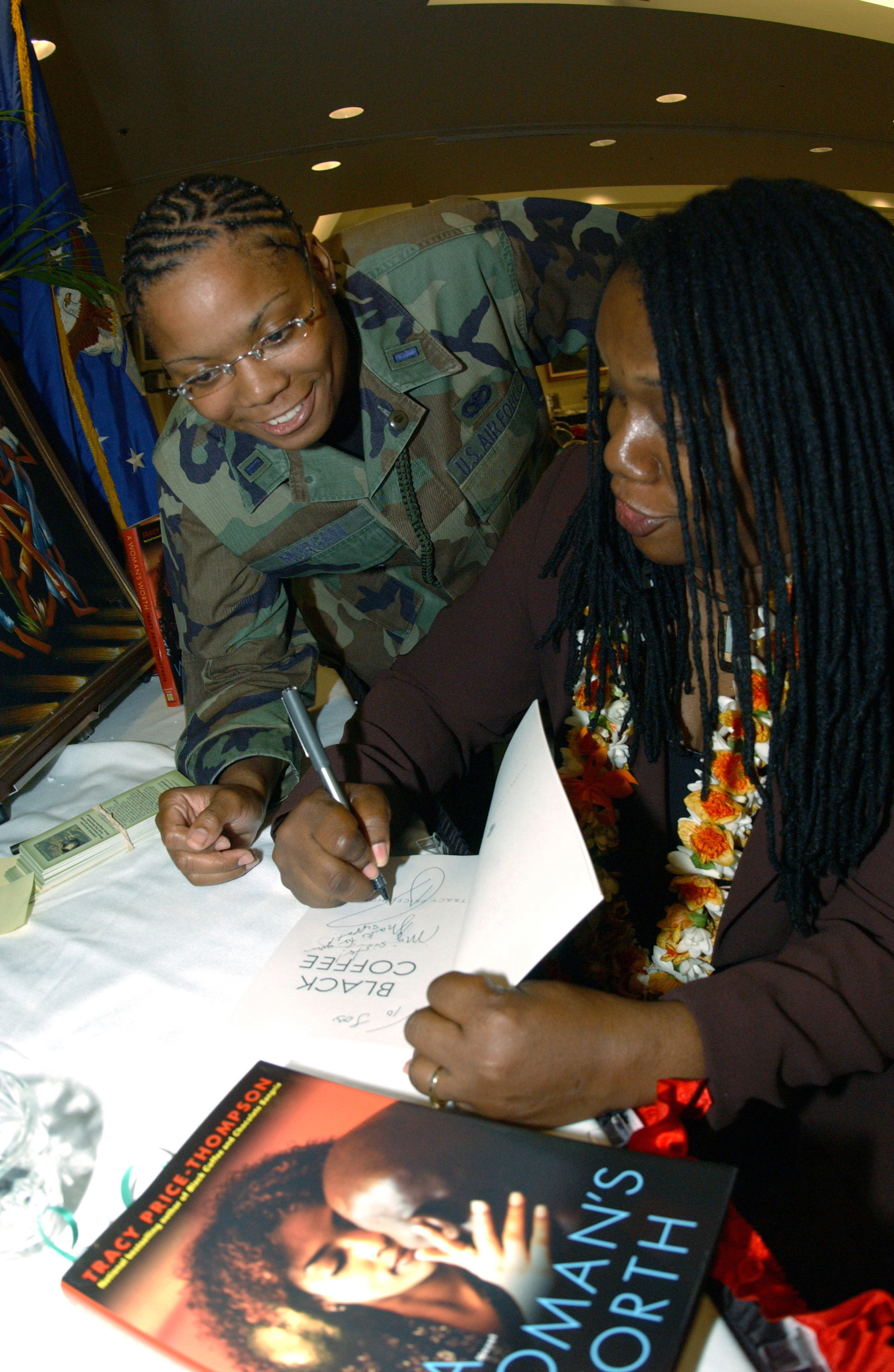
Signing autographs

== Sources ==
- Black Coffee, One World, 2005, p. 307, ISBN 978-0-345-49037-7
- A Woman's Worth, One World, 2005, p. 289, ISBN 978-0-375-75778-5
- Knockin' Boots, One World, 2007, p. 286, ISBN 978-0-345-49495-5
- Chocolate Sangria, One World, 2007, p. 316, ISBN 978-0-345-49493-1
- 1-900-A-N-Y-T-I-M-E, Atria Books, 2009, p. 272, ISBN 978-1416533054
- Proverbs for the People, Kensington, 2003, p. 512, ISBN 978-0758202864
- Other People's Skin, Atria Books, 2007, p. 386, ISBN 1416542078
- My Blue Suede Shoes, Atria Books, 2011, p. 320, ISBN 978-1416542087
