= Kalisha Buckhanon =

American author

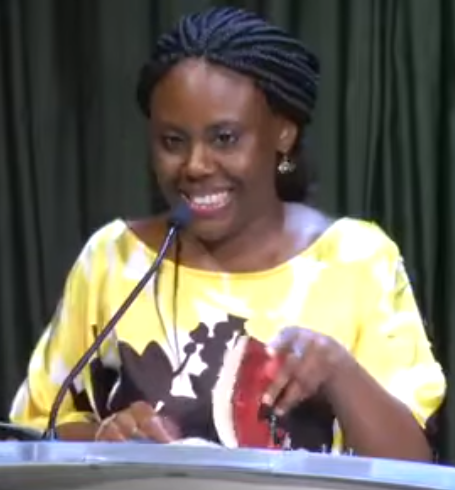
- At a National Book Foundation event in 2019
- Born: April 1, 1977 (age 49) Kankakee, Illinois, U.S.
- Occupation: Author
- Education: University of Chicago (BA, MA); New School University (MFA)
- Notable awards: Alex Award (2006)

Website
- www.kalisha.com

Kalisha Buckhanon (born April 1, 1977) is an American author who writes frequently on literature, race and Black women's themes. She was educated at the University of Chicago and The New School. She is a 2006 recipient of the Alex Award.

== Background ==
Born in Kankakee, Illinois, Buckhanon comes from a large middle-class Christian family. She was born when her parents, Kerry and Juwana Buckhanon, were teenagers. Buckhanon began writing as a young woman. She was high school Class President and a community activist as a commitment her parents raised her with. She has remarked she grew up in a time when Black American teenagers were besieged with stereotypes as "crack babies", "welfare moms" and "gangbangers", and she saw her life experiences and voice as ways to "correct misconceptions of Black life for generations to come". She found author Toni Morrison's novel The Bluest Eye at Kankakee Public Library and became empowered to write from a Black female perspective. Buckhanon received a Bachelor of Arts from the University of Chicago, and a Masters of Fine Arts (M.F.A) in Creative Writing from New School University. She studied as a humanities doctoral student at the University of Chicago, and obtained her Master of Arts in English from the program.

== Writing career ==
Buckhanon's first published short story was "Card Parties" in 2003 in the Michigan Quarterly Review. Her first novel, Upstate, was published in 2005 by St. Martin's Press. The novel was sold in a publishing auction for a mid six-figure sum. Upon its publication, Essence magazine named Buckhanon one of its "Three Writers to Watch".

Upstate tells the story of a young New York couple, and won an award from the American Library Association. The novel was called "wild and beautiful" by novelist Sapphire, "heartbreaking and true" by writer Dorothy Allison, and "intimate, wrenching" by novelist and journalist Achy Obejas. Author Terry McMillan called the book "honest" and stated that Buckhanon "captured real emotion". The book became a popular favorite among youth and urban teachers. Upstate was nominated for the Hurston/Wright Legacy Award in Debut Fiction. The Upstate audiobook won the Audie Award for Literary Fiction or Classics.

In 2008, her second novel Conception was published, again by St. Martin's Press. The novel tells the story of four months in the life of a young Chicago woman who discovers she is pregnant and wants to abort her unborn child, who also narrates part of the story. School Library Journal wrote that librarians should "recommend this moving novel to readers who enjoyed Toni Morrison's The Bluest Eye and Sapphire's PUSH". The Chicago-based literary society Friends of American Writers awarded the novel its 2009 Adult Literary Fiction Prize.

== Bibliography ==
- Upstate (2005)
- Conception (2008)
- Solemn (2016)
- Speaking of Summer (2019)
- Running to Fall (2022)

== Awards ==
- Illinois Arts Council Artist Fellowship in Prose (2001)
- Hurston/Wright Legacy Award – finalist (2006)
- Alex Award (2006)
- Audie Award for Literary Fiction or Classics (2006)
- Terry McMillan Young Author Award at the National Book Club Conference (2006)
- Friends of American Writers Adult Literary Fiction Award (2009)
