= Mary Alice Rich =

American composer

Mary Alice Rich is an American composer. She went to high school in Fairmont, Minnesota and studied violin under Paul Rolland and Sergiu Luca at the University of Illinois. She was a performing artist until a combination of a serious debilitating illness, strength of character, love of music, and loving support from friends and family transformed her into a composer. Her first opera, Wading Home, is based on her friend Rosalyn Story's novel of the same name. It was first performed at the Dallas City Performance Hall on April 2, 2015.
