= Kym Ragusa =

American film director

- Born: Kym L. Ragusa; February 25, 1966 (age 60); Manhattan, New York, U.S.
- Education: New School for Social Research; Hunter College
- Occupations: Writer, filmmaker, teacher
- Writing career
- Genre: Nonfiction

Kym L. Ragusa (born February 25, 1966) is an American writer and documentary filmmaker based in Brooklyn, New York.

== Early life and education ==
Ragusa was born in Manhattan, New York, to an Italian-American father and an African-American mother. Her paternal grandparents were immigrants from Messina; her maternal ancestors were brought to the United States as slaves. She spent much of her childhood living alternately with her maternal grandparents in Harlem and her paternal grandparents in Maplewood, New Jersey.

After attending public schools, Ragusa earned an M.A. in Media from the New School for Social Research. She also studied creative writing at Hunter College, where she was a student of Louise DeSalvo.

== Career ==
Ragusa directed two award-winning short documentary films, Passing (1995) and Fuori/Outside (1997). Her other films include Demarcations, Threads of Memory, and Remembering the Triangle Fire.

Her memoir, The Skin Between Us: A Memoir of Race, Beauty, and Belonging (W. W. Norton & Co., 2006), was a finalist for the 2007 Hurston/Wright Legacy Award for nonfiction, and has been well received by critics. An Italian-language edition, La pelle che ci separa, was published in 2008. Her writing has also appeared in anthologies, such as The Milk of Almonds: Italian American Women Writers on Food and Culture (2003), Personal Effects: Essays on Memoir, Teaching, and Culture in the Work of Louise DeSalvo (2014), and Are Italians White? How Race is Made in America (2012).

Much of Ragusa's artistic work explores themes of racial identity and belonging. In the foreword to Olive Grrrls: Italian North American Women & The Search For Identity (2013), Ragusa describes her uneasiness with pat answers to the question, "What are you?" and concludes that "No identity is singular, clear-cut, fixed; each is situated in histories and in daily lives that are endlessly complex."

Ragusa has taught Writing and Film Studies at Eugene Lang College and the City University of New York.

== Awards ==
- 1995: Juror's Prize, Women in the Director's Chair, for Passing
- 1997: Best Video, South Bronx Film and Video Festival, for Fuori/Outside
- 1999: New York Foundation for the Arts film fellowship
- 2007: Hurston/Wright Legacy Award finalist for The Skin Between Us
