= Geffrey Davis =

American poet

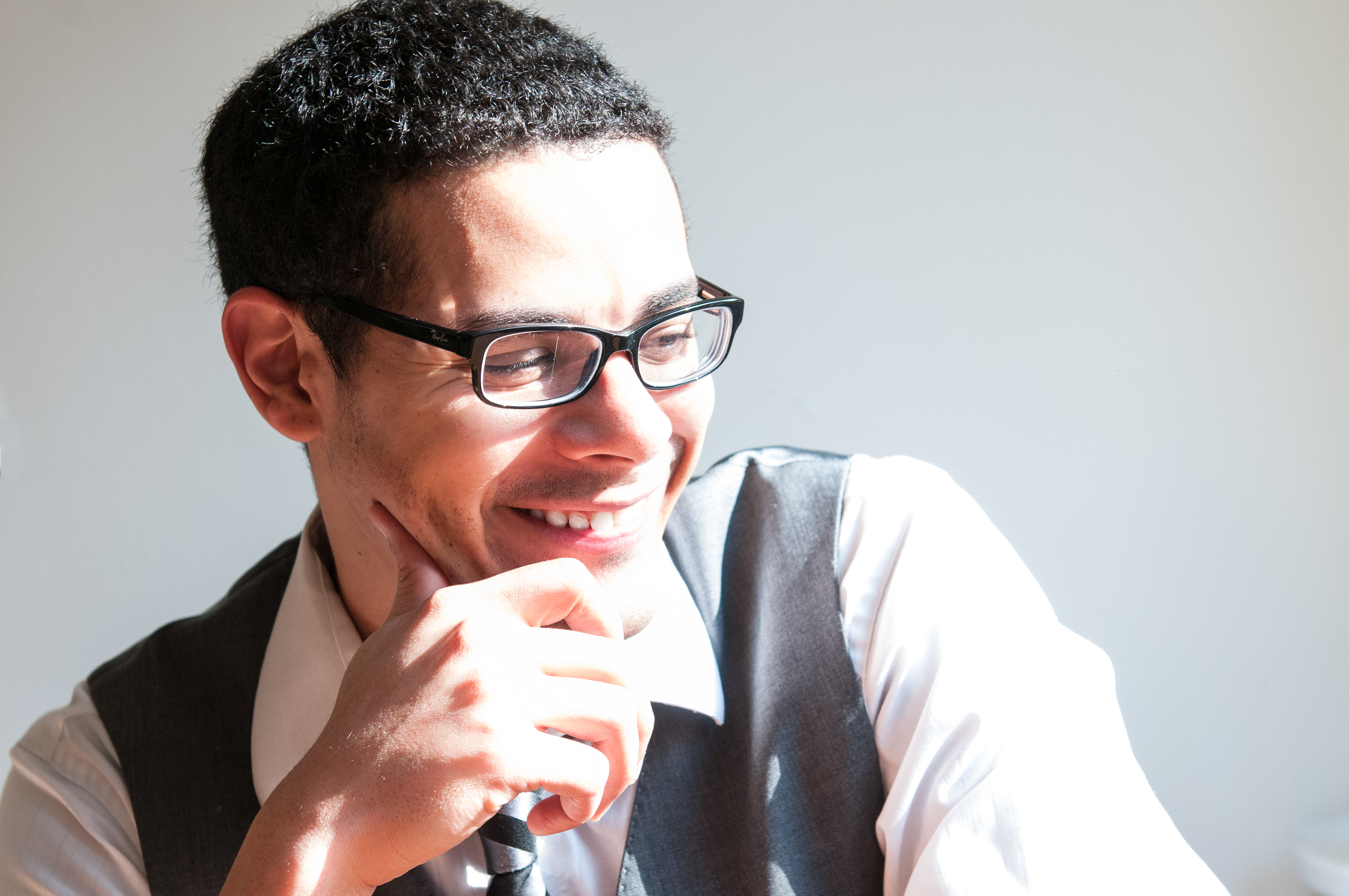
- Davis in 2013
- Born: 1983 (age 42–43); Seattle, Washington
- Education: Oregon State University; Penn State University
- Occupations: Poet, Professor
- Website: www.geffreydavis.com

Geffrey Davis (born 1983) is an American poet and professor. He is the author of Revising the Storm (2014) and Night Angler (2019). He teaches in The Arkansas Programs in Creative Writing and Translation at the University of Arkansas and lives in Fayetteville, Arkansas. He also serves on the poetry faculty at the Rainier Writing Workshop, a low-residency MFA program at Pacific Lutheran University.

== Personal life and education ==
Davis was born in Seattle, Washington in 1983 and graduated from Stadium High School, a public school in Tacoma, Washington, in 2001.

Davis earned his B.A. from Oregon State University in 2006. As an undergraduate student, Davis first double majored in zoology and photography. As an English major at Oregon State, he took creative writing courses from the poets Joseph Millar and David Biespiel and from the fiction writer Marjorie Sandor.

After taking a year off after graduation, Davis worked at a grocery store until he moved to State College, Pennsylvania, where he received three graduate degrees—an M.A. in English (2009), an M.F.A. in Poetry (2012), and a Ph.D. in English (2014)—from Pennsylvania State University.

As a graduate student, Davis was enrolled in the MA/PhD track, which focused on studying and writing critically about literature. After completing the Master of Arts (MA) degree in English in 2009, the poet Robin Becker, who was a professor of creative writing at Penn State at the time, invited Davis to join the creative writing program in poetry. He became dually enrolled in both the PhD program and the MFA program. He completed the MFA degree in 2012, under the mentorship of poets Robin Becker and Julia Kasdorf. His first book, Revising the Storm, began as his MFA thesis and was revised heavily over the next two years.

While a graduate student at Penn State, Davis joined Cave Canem Foundation. He was a fellow of Cave Canem in 2012 and 2013.

Geffrey Davis serves as poetry editor for Iron Horse Literary Review.

== Awards and honors ==
Revising the Storm won the 2013 A. Poulin, Jr. Poetry Prize, selected by Dorianne Laux, and was named a finalist for the 2015 Hurston/Wright Legacy Award. Davis has received the Anne Halley Poetry Prize, the Dogwood Prize in Poetry, the Leonard Steinberg Memorial/Academy of American Poets Prize, the Wabash Prize for Poetry, and fellowships from the Cave Canem Foundation. His poems have been published in numerous literary journals and magazines, including Crazyhorse, Hayden’s Ferry Review, The Massachusetts Review, Mid-American Review, Mississippi Review, The New York Times Magazine, Nimrod International Journal, and Sycamore Review. In 2011, Davis co-founded the journal Toe Good Poetry with Jerry Brunoe and Kevin Hockett. In 2018, he received a fellowship from the prestigious Bread Loaf Writers' Conference.

His second book of poetry, Night Angler (BOA Editions, 2019) won the 2018 James Laughlin Award, a second-book prize from the Academy of American Poets.

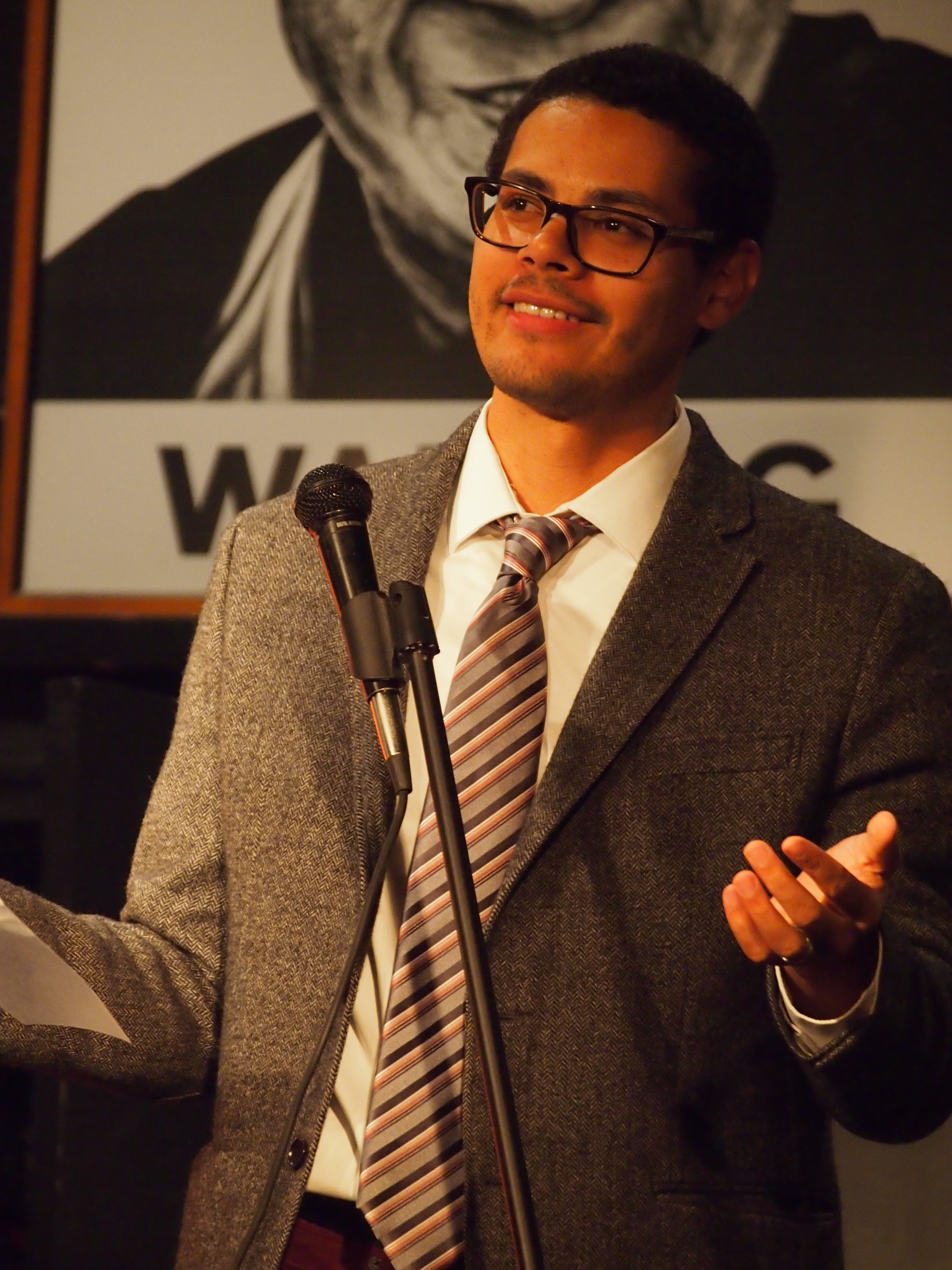
Geffrey Davis 180924

== Bibliography ==
- —— (2014). Revising the Storm. BOA Editions. ISBN 9781938160288.
- —— (2019). Night Angler. BOA Editions. ISBN 9781942683780.

== Adaptations ==
- "From 35,000 Feet / Praise Aviophobia" was adapted into a short film by Motion Poems, directed by Chad Howitt.
