= Yvvette Edwards =

British novelist

Yvvette Edwards FRSL
- Born: Barnet, London, England
- Occupation: Novelist
- Notable work: A Cupboard Full of Coats (2011); The Mother (2016)

Yvvette Edwards FRSL is a British novelist born in London, England, of Caribbean heritage. Her first novel, A Cupboard Full of Coats, was published in 2011 to much acclaim and prize nominations that included the Man Booker Prize longlist and the Commonwealth Book Prize shortlist. Edwards followed this debut work five years later with The Mother (2016), a novel that "reinforces her accomplishment". She is a contributor to the 2019 anthology New Daughters of Africa, edited by Margaret Busby.

== Biography ==
=== Early years and education ===
Of Caribbean parentage, Yvvette Edwards was born in Barnet, north London, and was brought up by her mother, who had migrated to Britain as a child from Montserrat. Edwards attended school in Hackney, east London, where she still lives with her family.

=== Writing career ===
Her first novel, A Cupboard Full of Coats, was published in 2011 by Oneworld Publications and received many accolades, among them being named a Kirkus Reviews "2011 Best of Fiction" choice, being longlisted for the 2011 Booker Prize, shortlisted for the Writers' Guild Awards 2011, shortlisted for the Waverton Good Read Award 2011, shortlisted for the Commonwealth Book Prize in 2012, nominated for the 44th NAACP Image Awards in January 2013, nominated for the International Dublin Literary Award 2013, and nominated for the Hurston/Wright Legacy Award 2013. It was described by Kirkus Reviews as "An impressive debut, particularly notable for its pellucid prose." Jonathan Barnes wrote of it in The Literary Review: "Rich in emotion but resolutely unsentimental, the story is unspooled with judgement and skill. Information is released at an almost ideal pace and secrets are withheld until the last possible moment. Edwards’s clear, colloquial prose is full of quietly impressive phrase-making. ... The performance is a wholly satisfying one and the novel’s valedictory suggestions of redemption feel earned, solid and real."

Edwards' second book, The Mother, published in 2016, received a nomination in the 48th NAACP Image Awards in the category "Outstanding Literary Work – Fiction", and was also a nominee for the Hurston/Wright Legacy Award in 2017. Highly recommending the novel, which "delves into the timely issue of violence against and between young black men—both its possible causes, and its heartrending effects on the families involved", BookPage stated that "Edwards perceptively explores a wide realm of issues ... with compassion for her characters and with intuitive understanding of the effects of loss on a family". Paste magazine described it as "a powerful work that illuminates the web of ramifications spun from a personal tragedy", and NBC News commented on the author's "masterful storytelling". The New York Journal of Books described it as "a clear-eyed, unsentimental novel about modern city life and the challenges parents face", and concluded: "The Mother is another hit-the-ball-out-of-the-park novel by a writer to watch. Yvvette Edwards should be proud of her work."

Her short story "Security" is included in the anthology New Daughters of Africa (ed. Margaret Busby, 2019).

Edwards was elected a Fellow of the Royal Society of Literature in November 2020.

In February 2025, it was announced that a third novel by Edwards, Good Good Loving – her first in almost a decade – had been acquired by Virago Press for publication in 2026.

== Bibliography ==
- A Cupboard Full of Coats, UK: Oneworld Publications, 2011, ISBN 9781851688388.
  - US: HarperCollins/Amistad, 2016, ISBN 9780062183736
- The Mother, UK: Pan Macmillan, 2016, ISBN 9781447294450.
  - US: HarperCollins/Amistad, 2016, ISBN 9780062440778
- Good Good Loving, UK: Virago Press: March 2026, ISBN 9780349019697.

== Awards and nominations ==
A Cupboard Full of Coats

- 2011: A Kirkus Reviews Best Book of the Year
- 2011: Booker Prize for Fiction shortlist
- 2011: Waverton Good Read Award shortlist
- 2011: Writers’ Guild Awards shortlist
- 2012: Commonwealth Book Prize shortlist
- 2013: 44th NAACP Image Awards nomination
- 2013: International Dublin Literary Award nomination

The Mother

- 2016: 48th NAACP Image Awards nomination
- 2017: Hurston/Wright Legacy Award nomination
