= Amaud Jamaul Johnson =

American poet (born 1972)

Amaud Jamaul Johnson (born 1972) is an American poet. He is currently a Professor of English at Stanford University. He has previously served as the Arthur M. and Fanny M. Dole Professor of English at Pomona College in Claremont, California.

== Early life ==
Johnson grew up in Compton, California.

== Career ==
Johnson has authored three poetry collections, Red Summer, Darktown Follies, and Imperial Liquor.
