= Wading Home =

2010 novel by Rosalyn Story

Wading Home: A Novel of New Orleans
- High Water Blues
- Author: Rosalyn Story
- Illustrator: ~illustrator consistent throughout novel~~
- Cover artist: Jane Lacy
- Language: English
- Genre: Fiction - Family Life, African American
- Published: Agate Bolden; First edition (September 24, 2010)
- Publication place: USA
- Media type: Print (Paperback, Kindle)
- Pages: 305
- ISBN: 978-1932841558

Wading Home: A Novel of New Orleans is the second novel by Rosalyn Story.

== Plot ==
A New Orleans family shattered by Hurricane Katrina struggles to reunite and recover.

== Publication history ==
- 2010, USA, Agate Bolden, Publication date September 24, 2010, Paperback.
- 2014, USA, Agate Bolden, Publication date December 10, 2014, Audible Audio Edition.

== Adaptations ==
The novel was adapted as an opera, Wading Home, by composer Mary Alice Rich.
