= Delores Phillips =

American novelist

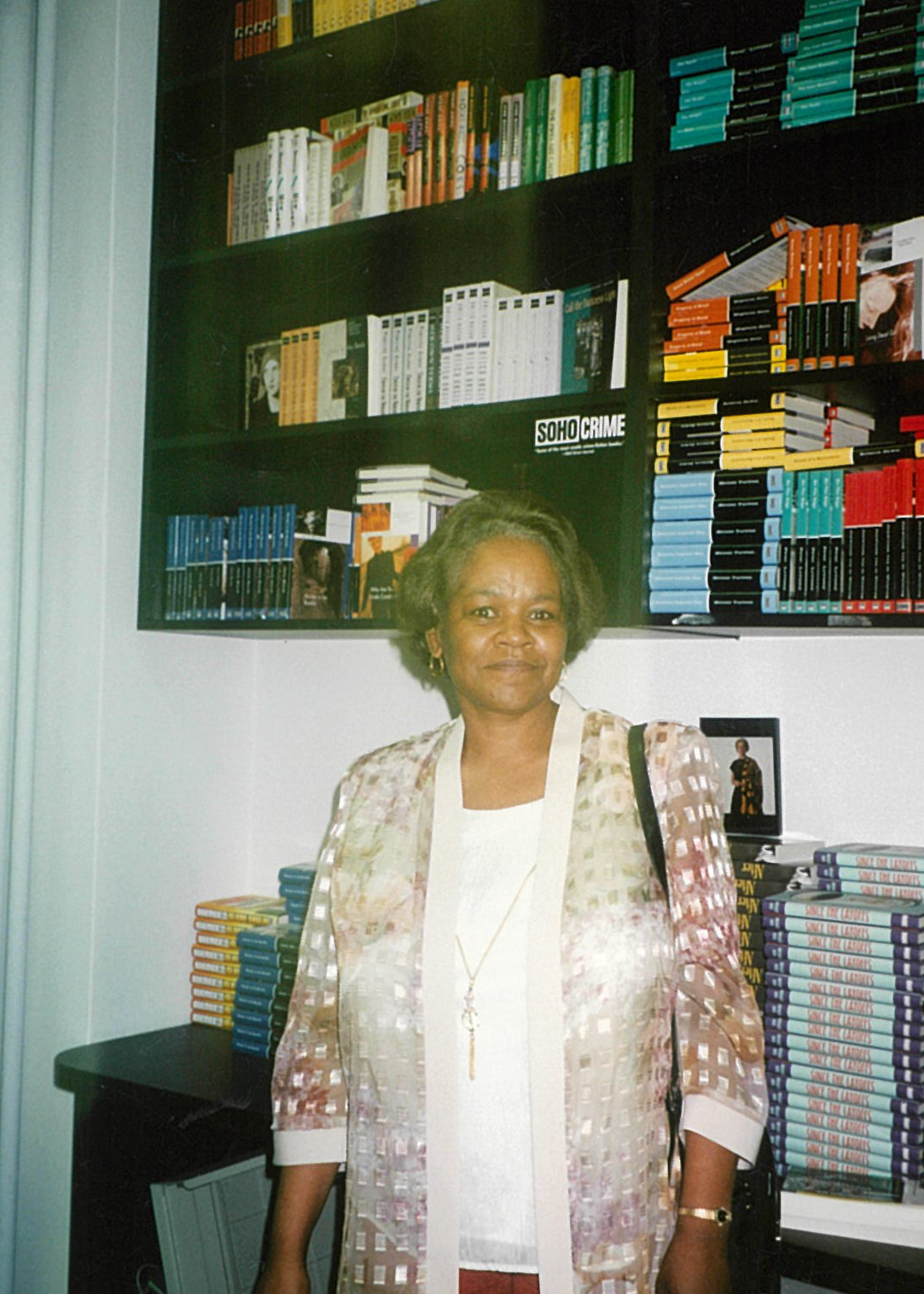
- Picture of Delores Phillips at Soho Press
- Born: September 26, 1950
- Died: June 7, 2014 (aged 63)
- Occupation: Poet; novelist; short story writer
- Notable works: The Darkest Child (2005); Stumbling Blocks and Other Unfinished Work (2023, posth.)

Delores Phillips (26 September 1950 – 7 June 2014) was an American author who is known for her acclaimed debut novel, The Darkest Child (Soho Press, 2005).

== Bio ==
Born in Georgia, Phillips explores the racial dynamics of the 1950s rural South in her book. She graduated from Cleveland State University and worked as a nurse in a facility for abused women and children in Cleveland. Her poetry has appeared in Jean’s Journal, Black Times, and The Crisis. She died at the age of 63.

== Publications ==
- The Darkest Child. Soho Press, 2005. ISBN 9781569473788
  - The Darkest Child. Soho Press, 2018. ISBN 9781616958725 (New Edition with introduction by Tayari Jones.)
- Stumbling Blocks and Other Unfinished Work (2023, posth.)
