= Dana Johnson =

American writer

- Born: 1967 (age 58–59); Los Angeles
- Education: University of Southern California; Indiana University

Dana Johnson (born 1967) is an American writer and Associate Professor at the University of Southern California. Honors include the Flannery O'Connor Award for Short Fiction, and being named a nominee for the Hurston/Wright Legacy Award. Her writing has appeared in Callaloo, The Iowa Review, and elsewhere.

== Life ==
Dana Johnson was born in Los Angeles in 1967, daughter to two working-class people who came from Tennessee looking for a better life. When she was nine, Dana and her parents moved. She grew up in what was then called South Central Los Angeles, on the corner of 80th and Vermont, and moved to the suburbs. Here, she experienced the huge difference between the various parts of California. This would later provide the writer with inspiration and creativity to write, even though this profession would make her the odd one out in her working-class family. In her twenties, Dana left Los Angeles to study at Indiana University, majoring in print journalism at University of Southern California with a minor in creative writing. Dana started writing seriously when she started her classes at University of California, Los Angeles extension and later when she went to graduate school at Indiana University to get her Master of Fine Arts. She returned to her hometown after completing her studies, settling at the then newly gentrified Echo Park. She is happily married to her husband, who is from Alabama. Dana is also a huge baseball fan, supporting the Dodgers in true Los Angeles spirit, a club she had gotten to know because her father had started taking her to games long before she even knew what she was looking at. Dana Johnson is now a celebrated author and a professor of English at the University of Southern California. She also serves as director of the PhD in Creative Writing and Literature Program. She was first published in the American Literary Review (University of North Texas) and the Missouri Review (University of Missouri).

== Writing style ==
Johnson’s works are partly based on her own experiences with living in different parts of Los Angeles and its surrounding areas. With her works she wants to show the varied sides of Los Angeles that are not usually given attention. Race, class consciousness and gender are major themes in her works. Throughout her works, she specifically focuses on the ways race, class and gender can intersect and inform a person’s identity and on the identity crisis that can come with this. Other topics that feature prominently in her works are assimilation, income inequality, gentrification and homelessness.

Although a lot of her work is about African-American people, she does not want to be put in a box: "I reject the idea that as a black woman, I'm relegated to writing black women exclusively. That is not what being a writer is for me." She simply wants to write about humans.

Johnson has been greatly influenced by Lou Matthews about whom she has said: [He] “was the first to encourage me, who told me I had some skills. I've known him for more than 25 years and he continues to be someone I look to.” Other authors that have inspired her are

James Baldwin, Raymond Carver, Studs Terkel, John Edgar Wideman, Mary Gaitskill, Junot Díaz, bell hooks, John Fante, Helena María Viramontes, Toni Cade Bambara and Chris Ware.

== Books ==
Break Any Woman Down: Stories (2001)

Johnson’s first book, Break Any Woman Down, which was published while she was at graduate school at the University of Indiana, earned her the Flannery O’Connor Award for short fiction. Break Any Woman Down is a collection of nine short stories. Most, but not all, of the stories center around African-American women from Southern California who are trying to find their own identity. Struggles they encounter include problems with fitting in within the suburbs and problems in romantic relationships with white men.

Elsewhere, California (2012)

Elsewhere, California, Johnson’s first novel, continues the story of Avery who also featured in two short stories in Break Any Woman Down. The novel is about one day in the life of Avery as an adult but this main narrative is interspersed with flashbacks to her childhood to show how she got to where she is now. Avery struggles with an identity crisis that stems from the fact that she is an African-American woman from a working-class family who has generally succeeded in life and has become middle class. She is also married to an Italian man which further complicates her identity.

In the Not Quite Dark: Stories (2016)

In the Not Quite Dark is Johnson's most recent publication, a collection of eleven stories that take place in and around Los Angeles. In the short stories, Johnson uses various characters to explore and discuss issues central to society such as race, class, and love. In order to do this, she picks the non-polished LA as a backdrop, and chooses to tell the stories that otherwise would get lost in the jumble of the city.

== Honors ==
- Nominee, Hurston/Wright Legacy Award (2013; for Elsewhere, California)
- Finalist, Patterson Fiction Prize (2002)
- Nominee, Hurston/Wright Legacy Award (2002; for Break Any Woman Down)
- Special Mention, Pushcart Prize (2002; for short story "Melvin in the Sixth Grade")
- Flannery O’Connor Award for Short Fiction (2001; for Break Any Woman Down)

== Bibliography ==
- Elsewhere, California (Counterpoint; 2012)
- Break Any Woman Down, stories (Anchor; 2001)
- In the Not Quite Dark: Stories (2016)
