= Sheri Booker =

American author and poet

- Born: Baltimore, Maryland, United States
- Occupations: Author, poet
- Writing career
- Notable awards: NAACP Image Award
- Website: www.sheribooker.com

Sheri Booker is an American author, poet, spoken word artist, and teacher. She is the author of Nine Years Under: Coming of Age in an Inner-City Funeral Home, a memoir about the near-decade she spent working at an inner-city funeral home in West Baltimore. Following the book's publication, she won an NAACP Image Award in the category of "Outstanding Literary Work from a Debut Author." She was nominated for the 2014 Hurston/Wright Legacy Award in the category of nonfiction.

== Early life and education ==
Booker grew up in Baltimore, Maryland. She began working at the Wylie Funeral Home in West Baltimore in 1997, when she was 15, partly to help her cope with her grief after the death of her aunt. Shortly thereafter, her mother was diagnosed with multiple myeloma.

Booker attended Notre Dame of Maryland University, where she earned a bachelor's degree in political science. She received a master's degree in creative nonfiction from Goucher College.

== Career ==
While studying for her master's degree, Booker began writing the memoir, Nine Years Under: Coming of Age in an Inner-City Funeral Home, which was published in 2013. Her other published works include One Woman, One Hustle (2003) and the video book I Am the Poem (2011). In 2007, she lived in South Africa, where she helped teach young African women the fundamental skills of journalism and worked as an editorial assistant for an international literary magazine.
