= Nafissa Thompson-Spires =

American writer

Nafissa Thompson-Spires (born 1983) is an African American writer. Her first book, Heads of the Colored People (2019), won the Los Angeles Times Art Seidenbaum Award for First Fiction, the PEN Open Book Award, a Hurston/Wright Legacy Award for fiction, and an Audie Award. Her debut novel, The Four Wives and Five Deaths of Richard Milford, is forthcoming in 2026 from Scribner.

== Early life ==
She was born in San Diego, California, in 1983. She earned a PhD in English from Vanderbilt University and an MFA in creative writing from University of Illinois and Vanderbilt University.

== Career ==
Her first book, Heads of the Colored People, won the Los Angeles Times Art Seidenbaum Award for First Fiction, PEN Open Book Award, and a Hurston/Wright Legacy Award for fiction, among other prizes. Heads of the Colored People has been translated into Italian, Turkish, and Portuguese.

She also won a 2019 Whiting Award. She was longlisted for the 2018 National Book Award.

Her fiction and creative nonfiction have appeared in New York, The Cut, The Root, The Paris Review, The White Review, Ploughshares, and many other places. Her short piece, “Unbought, Unbossed, Unbothered,” is included in The 1619 Project.

In 2020, she served as a judge for PEN America.

Thompson-Spires lives with endometriosis, about which she has written in The Paris Review and The Root.

In October 2018, she appeared on Late Night with Seth Meyers, alongside David Cross and Wanda Sykes.

== Works ==
- —— (2019). Heads of the Colored People (1st ed.). London: Vintage Books. ISBN 9781784706586.
