= Bernice McFadden =

American novelist

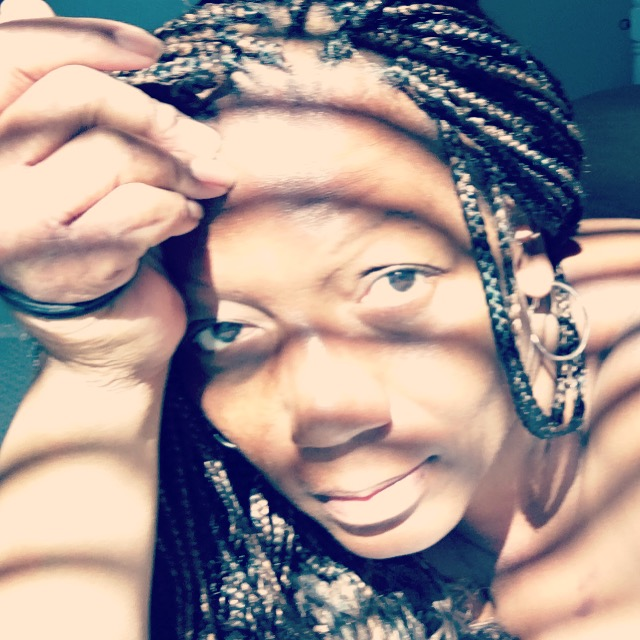
- Bernice McFadden
- Born: September 26, 1965 (age 61); Brooklyn, New York, U.S.
- Education: St. Joseph's College
- Writing career
- Pen name: Geneva Holliday
- Genre: novel

Bernice L. McFadden (born September 26, 1965) is an American novelist. She has also written humorous erotica under the pseudonym Geneva Holliday. Author of fifteen novels, she is an Assistant Professor of Creative Writing at Tulane University in New Orleans.

== Life ==
Bernice L. McFadden was born and raised in Brooklyn, New York.

In April 2005 McFadden was a MacDowell Colony Fellow in New Hampshire. She received an El Gouna Writers’ Residency in Egypt in June 2011. In April 2013 she was Serenbe Artist-in-Residence in Georgia.

In 2016 McFadden was awarded an MFA from The Writer's Foundry at St. Joseph's College in Brooklyn, NY.

In 2022, Bernice McFadden created and copyrighted the word: Angelcestor n A divine ancestor who serves as guide and protector of the living. (U.S. Serial Number: 97288112)

Mark: ANGELCESTOR

https://angelcestor.com

== Works ==
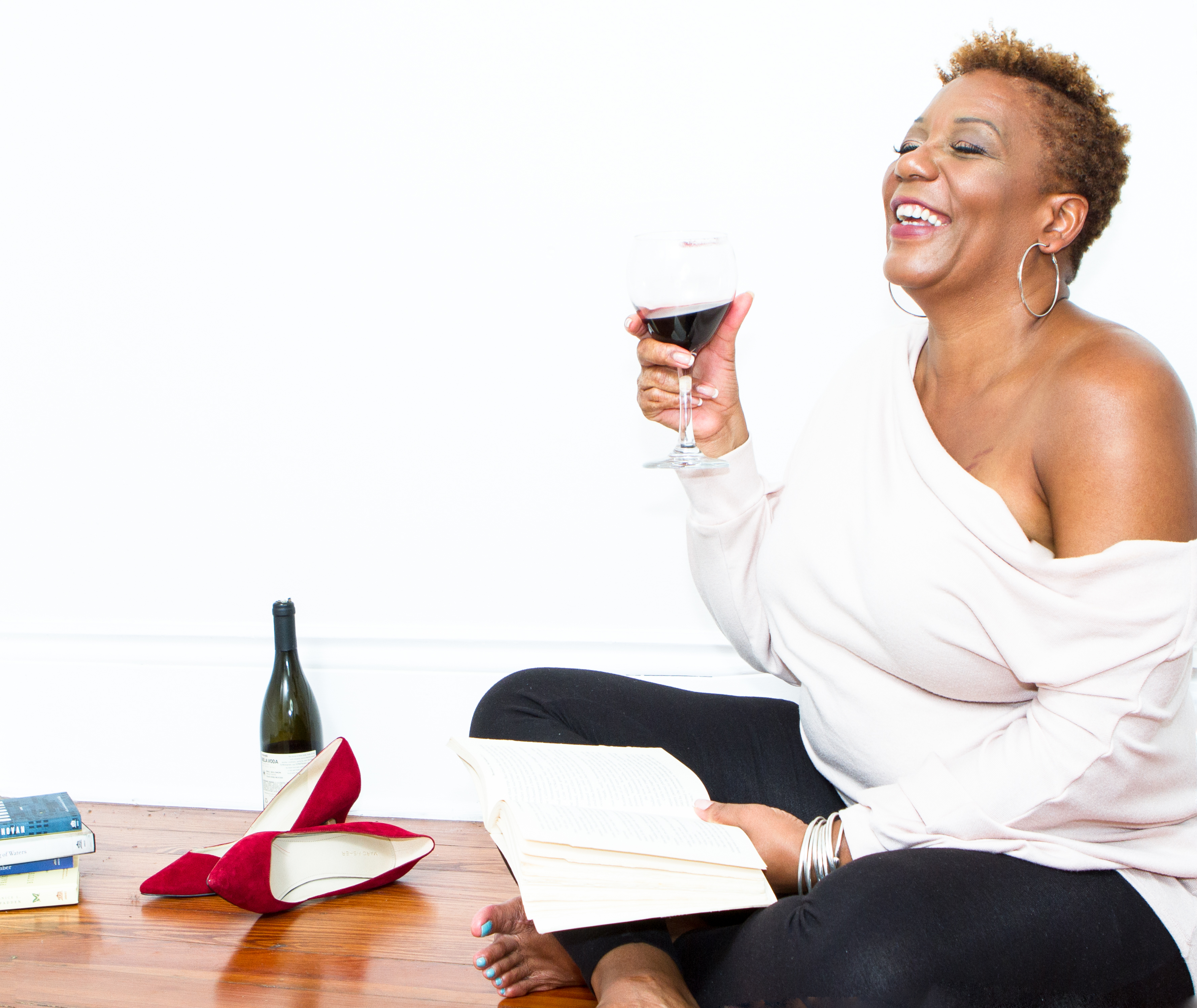
Bernice L. McFadden

- Sugar: A Novel. Dutton Publishers. 2000, ISBN 9780452282209, OCLC 881425318 (UK: Random House UK, Vintage. ISBN 9781784877316
- The Warmest December. Dutton Publishers. 2001, ISBN 9780525945642, OCLC 44391576
- This Bitter Earth. Dutton Publishers. 2002, ISBN 9780452283817
- Loving Donovan. Dutton Publishers. 2003, ISBN 9780525947066, OCLC 966238817
- Camilla's Roses. Dutton Publishers. 2004, ISBN 9780786267927
- Nowhere is a Place. Dutton Publishers. 2006, ISBN 9780525948759
- Glorious. Brooklyn, NY: Akashic Books, 2010, ISBN 978-1-936070-78-7, OCLC 456177974
- Gathering of Waters. New York: Akashic Books, 2012 ISBN 978-1-61775-031-1 OCLC 777863209
- Praise Song for the Butterflies, Brooklyn, New York: Akashic Books, 2018. ISBN 9781617755750, OCLC 1021874825 (UK: Jacaranda Books, ISBN 9781909762886)
- The Book of Harlan. Brooklyn, New York: Akashic Books, 2016 ISBN 978-1-61775-454-8, OCLC 923553504 (UK: Jacaranda Books, ISBN 9781909762435)

Writing as Geneva Holliday:

- Groove. Random House. 2005
- Fever. Random House. 2006
- Heat. Random House. 2007
- Seduction. Random House. 2008
- Lover Man. Random House. 2009

Short fiction

- "Keeper of Keys", USA Today Open Book Series. July 2001 (USA)
- "Luscious", Gumbo: A Literary Rent Party. Marita Golden, ed. Doubleday, 2002 (USA)
- "One Night Stand", Black Silk. Retha Powers, ed. Warner Books, 2002 (USA)
- "Sit", Brown Sugar II. Carol Taylor, ed. Washington Square Press, 2003 (USA)
- "Black Power", On The Line. Donna Hill, ed. Sepia Books, 2008 (USA)
- "Coming to America", Time Out New York. October 2014 (USA)
- "OBF Inc.", Cutting Edge: New Stories of Mystery and Crime by Women Writers. Joyce Carol Oates, ed. Akashic Books, 2019 (USA)
- "God's Work," Nicotine Chronicles. Lee Childs, ed. Akashic Books, 2020 (USA)
- "Tisoy.," Audible Originals, 2021 (USA)

Creative Non-fiction

- "Forward, Prologue & Preface". Black Boy. Richard Wright, Everbind Anthologies, 2003 (USA)
- "Superman Has His Cape." The Washington Post, March 19, 2006
- "The Power of Prayer." Black Pain. Terrie Williams, ed. Scribner, 2008 (USA)
- "Black Writers in a Ghetto of the Publishing Industry's Making," The Washington Post. June 26, 2010
- Review of If Sons, Then Heirs by Lorene Cary. The Philadelphia Inquirer. May 22, 2011
- "Life in Egypt." Crisis Magazine. December 2011
- Review of The Last Runaway by Tracy Chevalier. The Washington Post. January 10, 2013
- "Barbados", The New York Times (Travel Section). November 10, 2013
- "Bernice L. McFadden Introduces her New Novel, The Book of Harlan", October 10, 2016, www.foyles.co.uk. Retrieved November 15, 2020
- "15." What My Mother and I Don't Talk About. Michele Filgate, ed. Simon and Schuster (2019)
- "What Didn't Kill Her." Longreads June 4, 2020 (USA)
- "Zora Neale Hurston." Four Hundred Souls. Ibram X. Kendi, ed., Keisha N. Blain, ed. One World, 2021 (USA)
- "My Seat at the Table." Longreads, August 5, 2021(USA)
- "Love in the Time of King Cake", Oldster Magazine, November 15, 2021
- Where to start with Toni Morrison, The Guardian, July 21, 2022
- Add "Angelcestor" to your Vocabulary Oldster Magazine, June 19, 2023

== Awards, Honors, Recognitions, Mentions ==
- 2023 Librarians recommend their favorite books of all time https://www.libbylife.com/2023-07-24-librarians-recommend-their-favorite-books-of-all-time (Sugar)
- 2023 Beach Reads to Keep Arkansas on Your Mind https://onlyinark.com/homegrown/beach-reads-to-keep-arkansas-on-your-mind/ (Sugar)
- 2023 Opinion: A map of 1,001 novels to show us where to find the real America https://www.latimes.com/opinion/story/2023-05-28/american-novels-1001-literary-geography-map-states (Sugar)
- 2022 Black Book Canon https://medium.com/ballasts-for-the-mind/the-100-best-books-by-black-authors-4f91042b8a65 (Sugar, Loving Donovan)
- 2022 Born Free: A Renaissance Reading List https://www.nypl.org/blog/2022/08/08/born-free-renaissance-reading-list (Sugar)
- 2022 Battle Creek Reads (The Book of Harlan)
- 2021: Longreads Best of 2021 (My Seat at the Table)
- 2021: Richard and Judy Book Club pick (Sugar)
- 2020: Mary Cadden and others, USA Today, "100 Black novelists and fiction writers you should read, from Abi Daré to Zora Neale Hurston"
- 2019: Essence Magazine "Best Books of the Decade" (Gathering of Waters)
- 2019: Longlist, Women's Prize for Fiction (Praise Song for the Butterflies)
- 2019: BCALA Honor Award (Praise Song for the Butterflies)
- 2019; Go On Girl Book Club Author of the Year (The Book of Harlan)
- 2017: American Book Award (The Book of Harlan)
- 2017: Winner 2017 NAACP Image Award for Outstanding Literary Work (The Book of Harlan)
- 2016: Washington Post Notable Books of 2016 (The Book of Harlan)
- 2016: Historical Novel Society "November Editor’s Choice" (The Book of Harlan)
- 2016: National Reading Group Month/ Great Group Reads Selection (The Book of Harlan)
- 2016: Award for Excellence in Literature, Art Sanctuary, The Celebration of Black Arts Legacy Awards
- 2013: Finalist, Hurston Wright Legacy Award in Fiction (Gathering of Waters)
- 2013: National Reading Group Month/Great Group Reads Selection (Nowhere is a Place)
- 2012: The New York Times 100 Notable Books (Gathering of Waters)
- 2012: Washington Post 50 Best Books (Gathering of Waters)
- 2012: The New York Times "Editor’s Choice" (Gathering of Waters) February 17, 2012
- 2011: Finalist, Hurston Wright Legacy Award in Fiction (Glorious)
- 2011: Black Caucus of the American Library Association, Fiction Award (Glorious)
- 2011: Nominated for the 2011 NAACP Image Award for Outstanding Literary Work (Glorious)
- 2010: New York Times Book Review (Glorious)
- 2010: Debut Selection for The One Book, One Harlem Program (Glorious)
- 2010: O Magazine "Book to Watch" (Glorious)
- 2010: Historical Novel Society "Editor’s Choice" (Glorious)
- 2007: Short-listed for the Hurston Wright Legacy Award in Fiction (Nowhere is a Place)
- 2007: National Book Club Conference BeBe Moore Campbell Memorial Literary Award
- 2006: Washington PostBest Fiction (Nowhere is a Place)
- 2004: Subject of The Lifetime Television 20th Anniversary Commercial
- 2004: Black Caucus of the American Library Association, Fiction Honor Award (Loving, Donovan)
- 2002: Shortlisted for the Hurston Wright Legacy Award in Fiction (The Warmest December)
- 2002: Zora Neale Hurston Society Award for Creative Contribution to Literature
- 2001: Black Caucus of the American Library Association, Fiction Honor Award (Sugar)
- 2001: Black Writer's Alliance, Gold Pen Award, Best Mainstream Fiction (Sugar)
- 2001: Black Writer's Alliance, Gold Pen Award, Best New Author
- 2001: Go On Girl Book Club New Author of the Year Award (Sugar)
- 2000: New York Times Book Review (Sugar)
- 2000: Barnes & Noble Discover Great New Writers (Sugar)
