= Naomi Jackson =

American author

- Born: A. Naomi Jackson; Brooklyn, New York, United States
- Education: Williams College; University of Cape Town
- Occupation: Author
- Notable work: The Star Side of Bird Hill

A. Naomi Jackson is an Caribbean-American author most known for her novel The Star Side of Bird Hill, which was nominated for the NAACP Image Award and was a finalist for the 2016 Hurston/Wright Legacy Award. The novel was also longlisted for the Center for Fiction First Novel Prize, along with the John Leonard Award from National Book Critics as well as the International Dublin Literary Award. She is a Fulbright recipient, and a graduate of the Iowa Writers' Workshop. She owns an apartment in Brooklyn and a house in the Bronx.

Jackson's first novel, The Star Side of Bird Hill, was received positively by critics. It boasts recommendations by Entertainment Weekly, Oprah.com, The Huffington Post, Kirkus Reviews, Travel & Leisure, Bustle, Publishers Weekly, Gawker, Minnesota Public Radio, and For Harriet.

== Early life and education ==
A. Naomi Jackson was born and raised in Brooklyn, New York, United States, to West Indian parents. Jackson describes herself as "pan-Caribbean mongrel" as her father is from Antigua, her mother is from Barbados and her stepmother is from Jamaica. In Harper's Magazine, Jackson talks openly about her struggles with mental health and her journey to recovery.

Jackson is an graduate from Williams College and earned her MA degree in Creative writing through the University of Cape Town on a Fulbright scholarship. After several years of poetry and fiction workshops at Cave Canem and Frederick Douglass Creative Arts Center. Jackson, just shy of turning 30, was accepted into the Iowa Writers' Workshop to obtain her MFA.

== The Star Side of Bird Hill (2015) ==
Jackson's debut novel The Star Side of Bird Hill, published by Penguin Books in June 2015, follows two sisters, Dionne (16) and Phaedra (10) through their summer in Bible Camp in Barbados with their grandmother when their mother was unable to care for the two as she struggles with her own mental health. Jackson goes on to describe one theme in the novel was based around a family of women, as it explores motherhood, girlhood, sexuality and generational wounds. Jackson explains that the reason for the theme was draw upon based on her personal life, having survived, as she describes, 'Vacation Bible School in Antigua and a former acolyte in the Epsicopal Church in Brooklyn'. Jackson takes inspiration in writing her novels through reading Jamaica Kincaid's novels, especially Annie John.

== Reception ==
Naomi Jackson's debut novel, The Star Side of Bird Hill, was met immediately with high praise. Highly recommended by Gawker and The Huffington Post, NPR's book review "A Lyrical Coming Of Age Tale In 'Bird Hill'" was more critical. In this piece critic Michael Schaub call "[Star Side of Bird Hill] excellent for a debut novel, though it's not entirely without its flaws." He criticizes it for its treatment of supporting characters and a plot which, he writes, "seems to get away from her towards the end." However, these flaws, "are hardly mortal sins, especially for a first-time novelist." Throughout his review, he praises the writing of the character, Phaedra, which he says makes the book worth reading.

Isabella Biedenharn with Entertainment Weekly gave it a more positive review, calling it, "so poetic in its descriptions and so alive with lovable, frustrating, painfully real characters, that your emotional response to it becomes almost physical." She goes on to praise Jackson's treatment of Dionne, Hyacinthe, and Errol, as well as Phaedra.

== Honors and awards ==
- Scholar-in-Residence, Schomburg Center for Research in Black Culture, Fall 2021
- Early Career Research Fellowship, Institute for the Study of Global Racial Justice, Rutgers University, 2021–2022
- Juno Grant, The Freya Project, Summer 2021
- Bronx Recognizes its Own (BRIO) Award, Bronx Council on the Arts, 2020
- Finalist, Jerome Foundation Individual Artist Fellowship, 2019 & 2020
- Notable Essay, Best American Essays 2018, selected by Hilton Als
- New York Foundation for the Arts/New York State Council on the Arts Fellowship, 2018
- Djerassi Artist Residency, Summer 2018
- MacDowell Colony Fellowship, Winter 2017 & Winter 2019
- Headlands Artist in Residence Program, Alternate, December 2016
- 2017 International Dublin Literary Award (formerly IMPAC award) Long List, November 2016
- The Star Side of Bird Hill - Official Selection, City of New York's Gracie Book Club, Fall 2016
- Winner, Late Night Library Debut-litzer Prize in Fiction, August 2016
- Brooklyn Public Library Brooklyn Eagles Literary Prize in Fiction Long List, July 2016
- Hurston/Wright Legacy Award in Debut Fiction Nomination, June 2016
- Fiction Fellowship, 2016 Bread Loaf Writers’ Conference
- Honor Book for Fiction, Black Caucus of the American Library Association, January 2016
- National Book Critics Circle John Leonard Prize for First Book Long List, December 2015
- NAACP Image Award Nomination, Outstanding Literary Work – Debut Author, December 2015
- 2015 Center for Fiction First Novel Prize Long List, July 2015
- Camargo Foundation Fellowship, Cassis, France, Fall 2014

== Publications ==
=== Books ===
- The Star Side of Bird Hill, novel, Penguin Press, June 30, 2015 (paperback, August 30, 2016). Extracted in New Daughters of Africa, edited by Margaret Busby, 2019.

=== Stories and articles ===
- "Her Kind", Harper's (December 2021)
- "One in a Million: An Elegy for Aaliyah", Harper's Bazaar (August 2021)
- Review of Zakiya Dalila Harris's The Other Black Girl, Washington Post (June 2021)
- Review of Monica West's Revival Season, Washington Post (May 2021)
- "I Wanted to Celebrate My 40th Birthday at Crop Over. COVID-19 Had Other Plans", Harper's Bazaar (February 2021)
- Review of Ladee Hubbard's The Rib King, Washington Post (January 2021)
- Review of Robert Jones, Jr.’s The Prophets, Washington Post (January 2021)
- “The Confounding Insistence on Innocence: A Conversation with Danielle Evans", Poets & Writers (November/December 2020)
- "A Litany for Survival: Giving Birth as A Black Woman in America", Harper's (September 2020)
- Review of Ingrid Persaud’s Love After Love, Washington Post (August 2020)
- Review of Zora Neale Hurston's Hitting a Straight Lick with a Crooked Stick, Washington Post (January 2020)
- “Joy Comes in the Morning: Finding Sanctuary in the Wake of Pulse", Virginia Quarterly Review (June 2017)
- "Minding the Gap: On Sex & Love & the In-Between", Tin House (#69, Fall 2016)
- "Making the Road by Walking: From Brooklyn to the Iowa Writers’ Workshop", Poets & Writers (September/October 2016)
- “Falling in Love with Bahia & Brazil: On Blackness, Saudade & Surrender", Words Without Borders (July 2016)
- "To Be Young, Gifted and Black: A Travelogue of Black Women Artists in France and America", Apogee (May 2015)
- Digital essays for BuzzFeed, Elle.com, espnW, LitHub, and New York Magazine's The Cut (2015–2016)
- "Bumpers", Kweli (August 2014)
- "Fever", Caribbean Beat (July/August 2005)
