= Ravi Howard =

American novelist

Ravi Howard is an American novelist and a professor at Florida State University. His first novel Like Trees, Walking was published in 2007 and inspired by the lynching of Michael Donald. In 2008, Howard was a finalist for the PEN/Hemingway Award for Debut Novel and won the Ernest J. Gaines Award for Literary Excellence. His second novel, Driving the King, was published in 2014 and is about the friendship between Nat King Cole and his friend Nat Weary. In The New York Times, critic Janet Maslin called Driving the King "a thoroughly convincing story" and a "warmly enveloping book." In 2021, Howard's short story "The Good Thief," originally published in Alabama Noir, was included in the anthology Best American Mystery and Suspense 2021.

During his time in television, he won a Sports Emmy Award for writing for the show Inside the NFL.
