= Walk Through Darkness =

2002 novel by David Anthony Durham

- Cover of first edition (hardcover)
- Author: David Anthony Durham
- Language: English
- Genre: Historical fiction novel
- Publisher: Doubleday
- Publication date: 2002
- Publication place: United States
- Media type: Print (Hardback and paperback)
- Pages: 304 pp
- ISBN: 0-385-49925-6
- OCLC: 48038420
- Dewey Decimal: 813/.6 21
- LC Class: PS3554.U677 W35 2002

Walk Through Darkness is a 2002 novel by American author David Anthony Durham.

== Publication details ==
- Written by David Anthony Durham
- First published: Doubleday, United States, 2002.
- Also published in Portuguese

== Plot summary ==
When he learns that his pregnant wife has been spirited off to a distant city, William responds as any man might—he drops everything to pursue her. But as a fugitive slave in antebellum America, he must run a terrifying gauntlet, eluding the many who would re-enslave him while learning to trust the few who dare to aid him on his quest.

Among those hunting William is Morrison, a Scot who as a young man fled the miseries of his homeland only to discover more brutal realities in the New World. Bearing many scars, including the loss of his beloved brother, Morrison tracks William for reasons of his own, a personal agenda rooted in tragic events that have haunted him for decades.

Walk Through Darkness is a provocative meditation on racial identity, freedom and equality. It followed Durham's award-winning Gabriel's Story and preceded his bestselling Pride of Carthage.

== Awards and honors ==
- New York Times Notable Book
- Best of 2002 selection from The San Francisco Chronicle, Black Issues Book Review and The Atlanta Journal Constitution
- Summer Reading Pick from The Washington Post
- Editor's Choice for Summer Reading from The Wall Street Journal
- 2004 selection for the Chicago Public Library's Book Club.
- For reviews see: San Francisco Chronicle (May 5, 2002), The New York Times (May 16, 2002), The New York Times Book Review (June 9, 2002), The Washington Post (July 16, 2002), and the Tavis Smiley Show on National Public Radio (August 9, 2002).
