= Central Library (Indianapolis) =

Library building in Indianapolis, Indiana, US

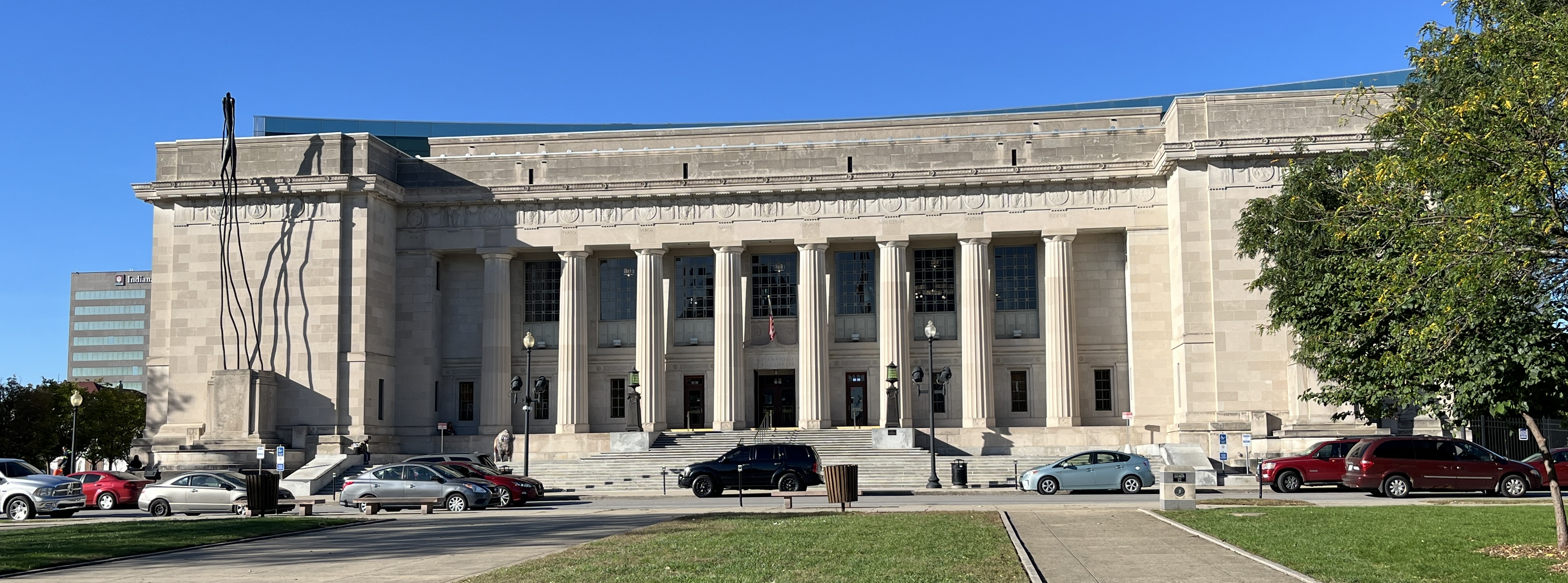
- Central Library in 2024

General information
- Location: Indianapolis, Indiana, 40 E. St. Clair St., U.S.
- Coordinates: 39°46′42″N 86°9′24″W
- Opened: October 8, 1917; 109 years ago
- Renovated: 1975, 2007
- Owner: Indianapolis Public Library

Technical details
- Floor count: 6
- Floor area: 293,000 square feet (27,200 m^{2})

Design and construction
- Architect: Paul Philippe Cret
- Architecture firm: Zantzinger, Borie & Medary

Renovating team
- Architect: Woollen, Molzan and Partners

Other information
- Parking: 397 spaces
- Public transit: 39; Indiana Pacers Bikeshare

Website
- www.indypl.org/locations/central-library
- Central Library (Indianapolis–Marion County Public Library)
- U.S. National Register of Historic Places
- Area: 1 acre (0.40 ha)
- NRHP reference No.: 75000045
- Added to NRHP: August 28, 1975

Central Library is the main branch of the Indianapolis Public Library in Indianapolis, Indiana, United States. Central Library opened to the public on October 8, 1917. It was added to the National Register of Historic Places as Central Library (Indianapolis–Marion County Public Library) on August 28, 1975.

The original building was designed by Philadelphia-based architect Paul Philippe Cret (with Zantzinger, Borie and Medary). It was constructed in Greek Doric style architecture, faced with Indiana limestone on a Vermont marble base. A modern glass and steel addition was completed in 2007. It is the third-oldest library in Indianapolis still used for its original purpose, preceded by the East Washington (1911) and Spades Park branches (1912).

== History ==
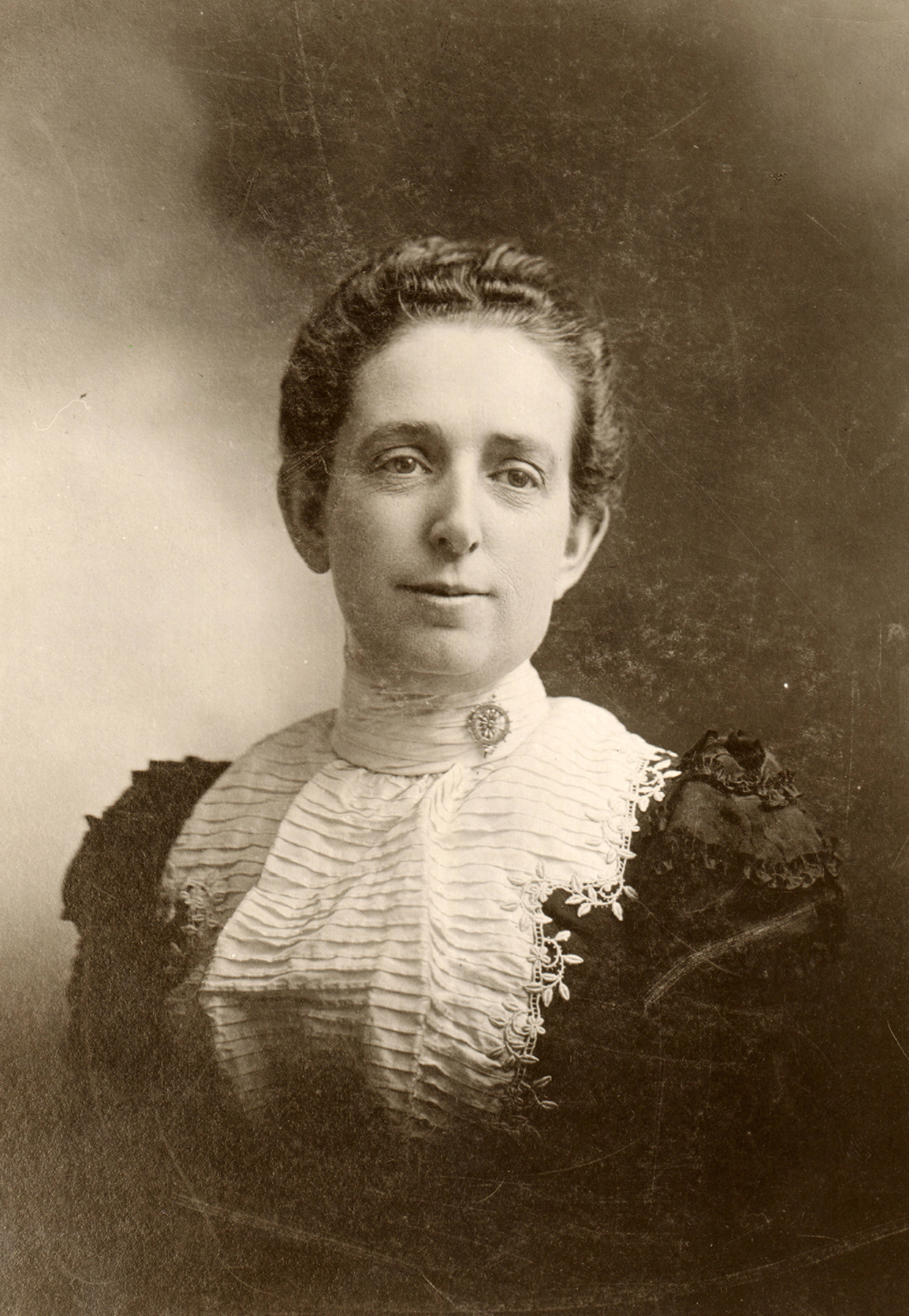
Library director Eliza Gordon Browning oversaw the opening of Central Library in 1917

Central Library was built on land donated by the poet James Whitcomb Riley. The library opened on October 7, 1917.

Central Library has undergone a number of expansions and renovations over the years. A 40,000-square-foot (3,700 m^{2}) annex to the Central Library was completed in 1975 and the restoration of historically significant architecture was completed in the 1980s.

Central Library temporarily relocated to Old Indianapolis City Hall from December 2002 to December 2007 while expansion construction commenced.

On October 7, 2017, the Indianapolis Public Library commemorated Central Library's 100th anniversary with the opening of a time capsule, musical performances, and a birthday cake.

== Collections ==
=== Center for Black Literature & Culture ===
The 3,800-square-foot (350 m^{2}) Center for Black Literature & Culture opened in 2017, provided by $1.3 million in grant funding from the Lilly Endowment. The center houses some 10,000 books, magazines, DVDs, and e-books with plans to qruple the collection to 40,000 items over the next five years. The center's window banners pay tribute to local Black figures, including former Indiana Fever basketball player, Tamika Catchings, poet and playwright, Mari Evans, and Congresswoman Julia Carson. Phase II of the project commenced after an Indianapolis City-County Council committee issued $5.3 million in bonds for facility upgrades and projects in July 2020.

=== Chris Gonzalez Collection ===
In 2019, the Indianapolis Public Library, in partnership with Indy Pride and others, dedicated the Chris Gonzalez Collection, named for LGBTQ activist and Indiana Youth Group co-founder Christopher T. Gonzalez. The collection of 7,000 items relating to local and national LGBTQ+ history and culture was merged with the Central Library collection.

=== Nina Mason Pulliam Indianapolis Special Collections Room ===
The Indianapolis Special Collections Room is named for newspaper executive Nina Mason Pulliam. The collection contains various archival adult and children's materials, both fiction and nonfiction books by local authors, photographs, scrapbooks, typescripts, manuscripts, autographed editions, letters, newspapers, magazines, and realia. The collection features Kurt Vonnegut, May Wright Sewall, the Woollen family, James Whitcomb Riley, and Booth Tarkington.

== Architecture ==
=== Cret building ===
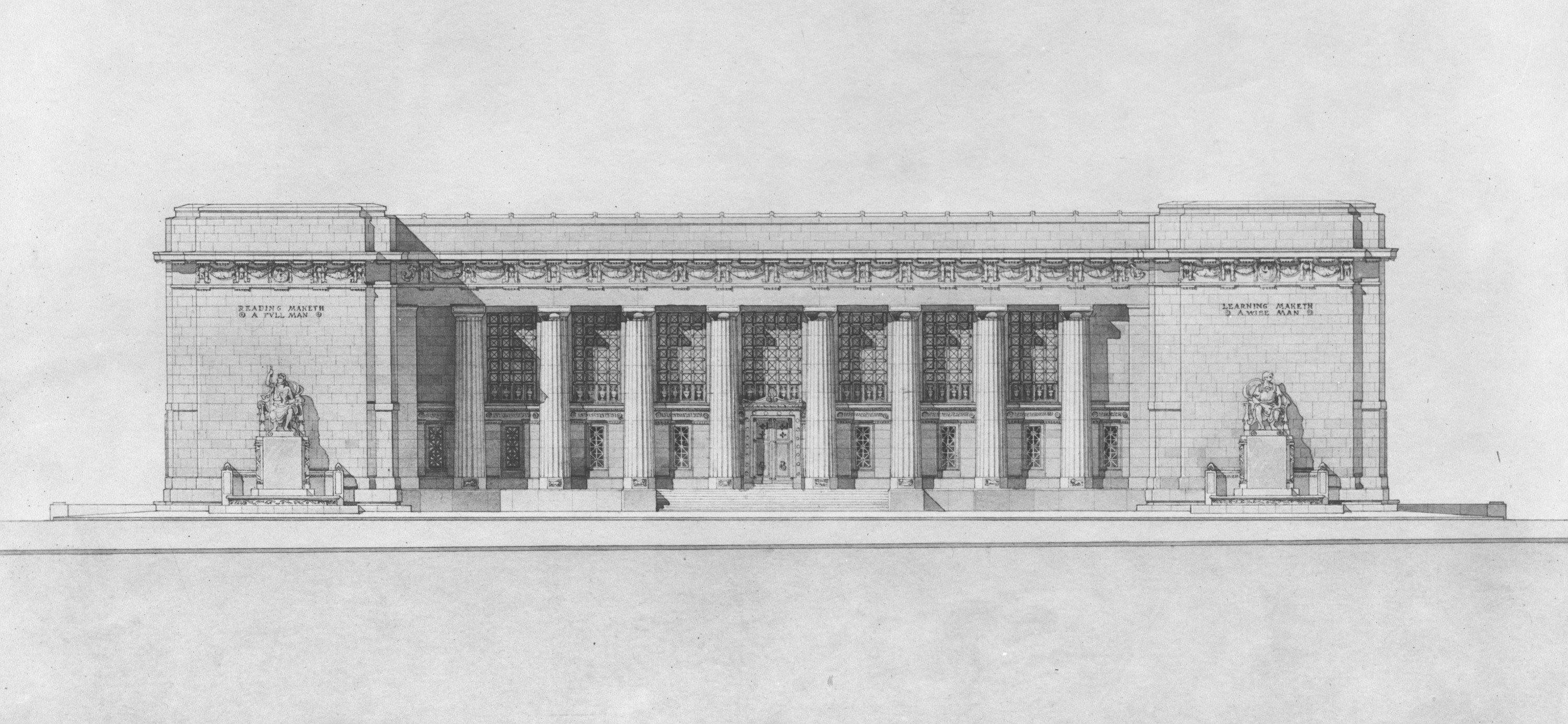
Architectural rendering of the Central Library's south elevation from 1913

Central Library contains a number of distinguished architectural design elements. The main reading room 100 feet (30 m) by 45 feet (14 m) inside the main entrance has two flights of Maryland marble stairs, two 30 feet (9.1 m) diameter bronze light fixtures, and an ornamental ceiling designed by Clarence C. Zantzinger. The ceiling includes oil-on-canvas medallions and printers' colophons accompanied by a series of bas-relief plaster plaques depicting early-Indiana history. Reading rooms at the top of each staircase have wood paneling above oak bookcases and large leaded glass windows. Central Library was added to the National Register of Historic Places on August 28, 1975.

Writing for Architectural Forum in 1918, architect Ralph Adams Cram described Central Library as "one of the most distinctive and admirable contributions to architecture that have been made in America."

=== Woollen building ===
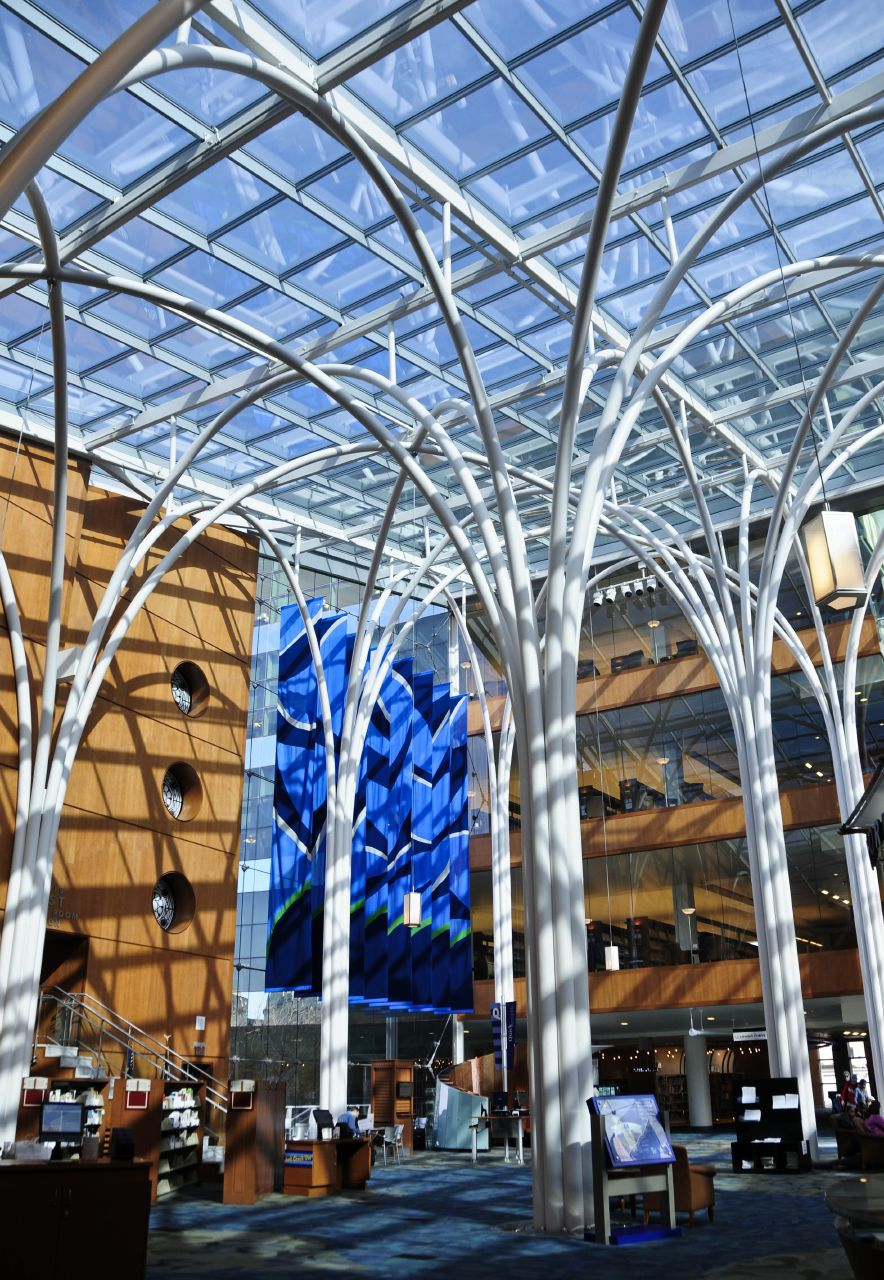
Atrium of the library's contemporary wing in 2008

In 2001, Indianapolis-based architectural firm Woollen, Molzan and Partners was commissioned to renovate the historic building, expand with a six-story addition, and incorporate an underground parking garage. The new curved glass curtainwall façade and atrium would connect to the Cret-designed building, replacing the annex built in the 1970s. Evans Woollen III, principal architect, conceptualized the library's design as a secondary terminus to the Indiana World War Memorial Plaza immediately south.

The $104 million project doubled the size of the library but proved controversial due to a number of design and construction flaws. The renovated Central Library and its new atrium addition opened on December 9, 2007, two years behind schedule and over budget.

Clowes Auditorium is a 329-seat theater on the library's northwest side.

== Art ==
=== Public art ===
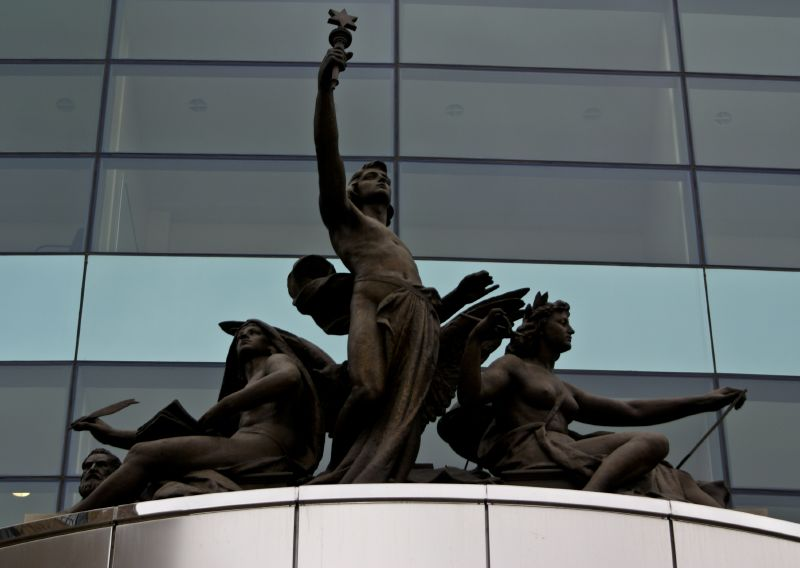
Arts, Sciences and Letters adorns the north entrance to Central Library

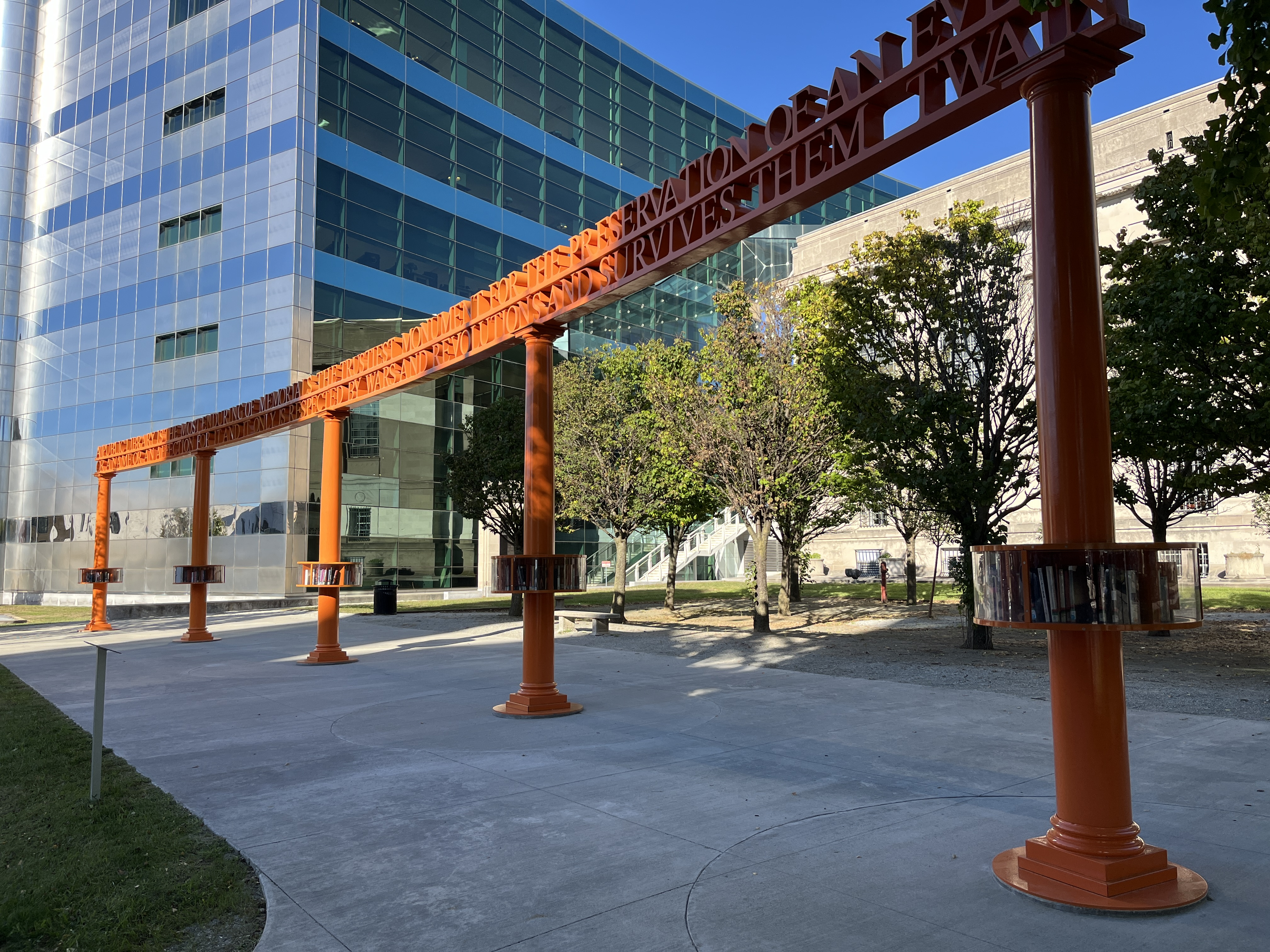
Monument on the Meridian Street side of the building

- Arthur St. Clair Memorial (1938), bronze tablet set in limestone commissioned by the Daughters of the American Revolution to honor of Arthur St. Clair (artist unknown)
- Arts, Sciences and Letters (1893), bronze sculpture by Richard Bock
- The Book of Life: The People We Know, the Experiences We Have, and the Conditions under Which We Live (2008), mural by Tom Torluemke
- Light, Words, Life (2007) by Arlon Bayliss and Joyce Brinkman
- Monument (2015), installation art by Brian McCutcheon
- Peace Dove (2014), sculpture by Ryan Feeney
- RIOS (Random Information Organization System) (2007), wall relief by Ed Francis
- thinmanlittlebird (2009), two-piece sculpture by Peter Shelton

In response to the George Floyd protests, a coalition of Indianapolis cultural leaders organized a grassroots public art project matching 22 Black artists with businesses interested in displaying messages of racial justice. In total, 24 pieces were painted on plywood-covered windows in downtown Indianapolis. To ensure their preservation, each mural was photographed and printed onto 3-foot (0.91 m)-by-5-foot (1.5 m) vinyl banners and exhibited at Central Library's Center for Black Literature and Culture. The banners are available for loan to the public for educational purposes.

=== "Meet the Artists" ===
During Black History Month, Central Library hosts "Meet the Artists," an annual art exhibition showcasing work by local African American artists. The idea for an exhibition was prompted by artist-in-residence Anthony Radford's firsthand experiences finding few spaces in the city featuring the work of Black artists. Radford pitched his idea to the library's African American History Committee in 1988, earning their support. The first exhibition in 1989 included 11 artists and drew 200 visitors.

"Meet the Artists" has grown to include an opening night gala of music, workshops, and a fashion show, followed by a month-long exhibition, regularly drawing more than 1,500 participants. More than 400 Black visual artists, poets, dancers, authors, and musicians have been featured since the event's establishment.

== See also ==
- List of attractions and events in Indianapolis
- National Register of Historic Places listings in Center Township, Marion County, Indiana
