= Indianapolis Public Library =

Public library system in Marion County, Indiana, US

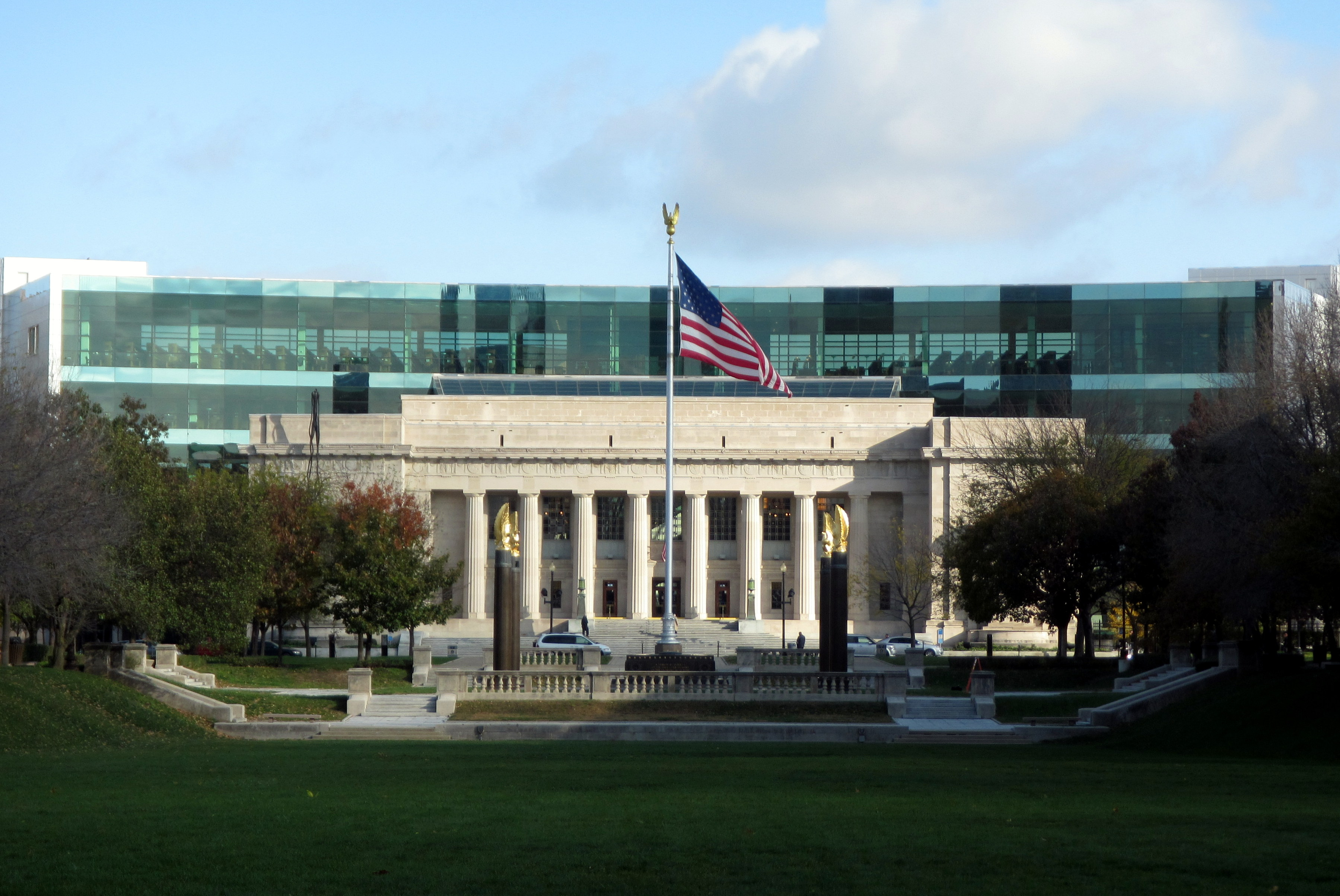
- Indianapolis Public Library's Central Library from the American Legion Mall
- Location: Indianapolis, Indiana, U.S.
- Established: 1873; 153 years ago
- Branches: 24

Access and use
- Circulation: 7,077,479
- Population served: 952,389

Other information
- Budget: $60,087,318
- Director: Gregory A. Hill
- Employees: 600+
- Website: www.indypl.org

The Indianapolis Public Library (IndyPL), formerly known as the Indianapolis–Marion County Public Library, is the public library system in Indianapolis, Indiana, United States, and serves communities throughout Marion County. The library was founded in 1873 and has grown to include its flagship Central Library and 24 branch libraries located throughout the county. In 2021, the public library system circulated 7.1 million items and hosted more than 2,500 programs for its 282,000 cardholders.

== History ==
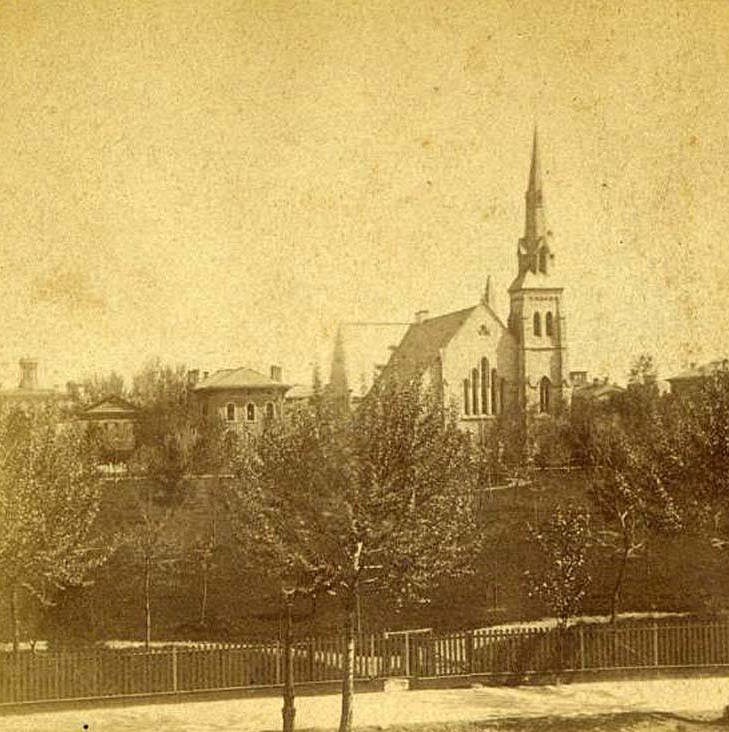
Memorial Presbyterian Church (ca. 1873), the site of Rev. Edson's sermon ignited the movement for a public library in Indianapolis.

The Indianapolis Public Library system attributes its beginnings to a Thanksgiving Day, 1868, sermon by Hanford A. Edson, pastor of the Memorial Presbyterian Church (which would later become Second Presbyterian Church), who issued a plea for a free public library in Indianapolis. As a result, 113 residents formed the Indianapolis Library Association on March 18, 1869. In 1870, under the leadership of the superintendent of public schools, Abram C. Shortridge, citizens drafted a revision of Indiana school law to provide public libraries controlled by a board of school commissioners. The bill passed the Indiana General Assembly, allowing school boards to levy taxes to establish and maintain public libraries.

In 1872, the public library committee of the school board hired Cincinnati librarian William Frederick Poole to begin a collection for the new library and appointed Charles Evans as the first librarian. Indianapolis' first public library opened in one room of the Indianapolis High School building at the northeast corner of Pennsylvania and Michigan streets on April 8, 1873. Upon opening, the library's collection numbered 13,000 volumes and registered 500 borrowers. By the end of its first full year of operation, some 3,000 patrons borrowed more than 100,000 books. Later, as the need for more space grew, the library moved to the Sentinel Building on Monument Circle (1876–1880) and the Alvord House at Pennsylvania and Ohio streets (1880–1893).

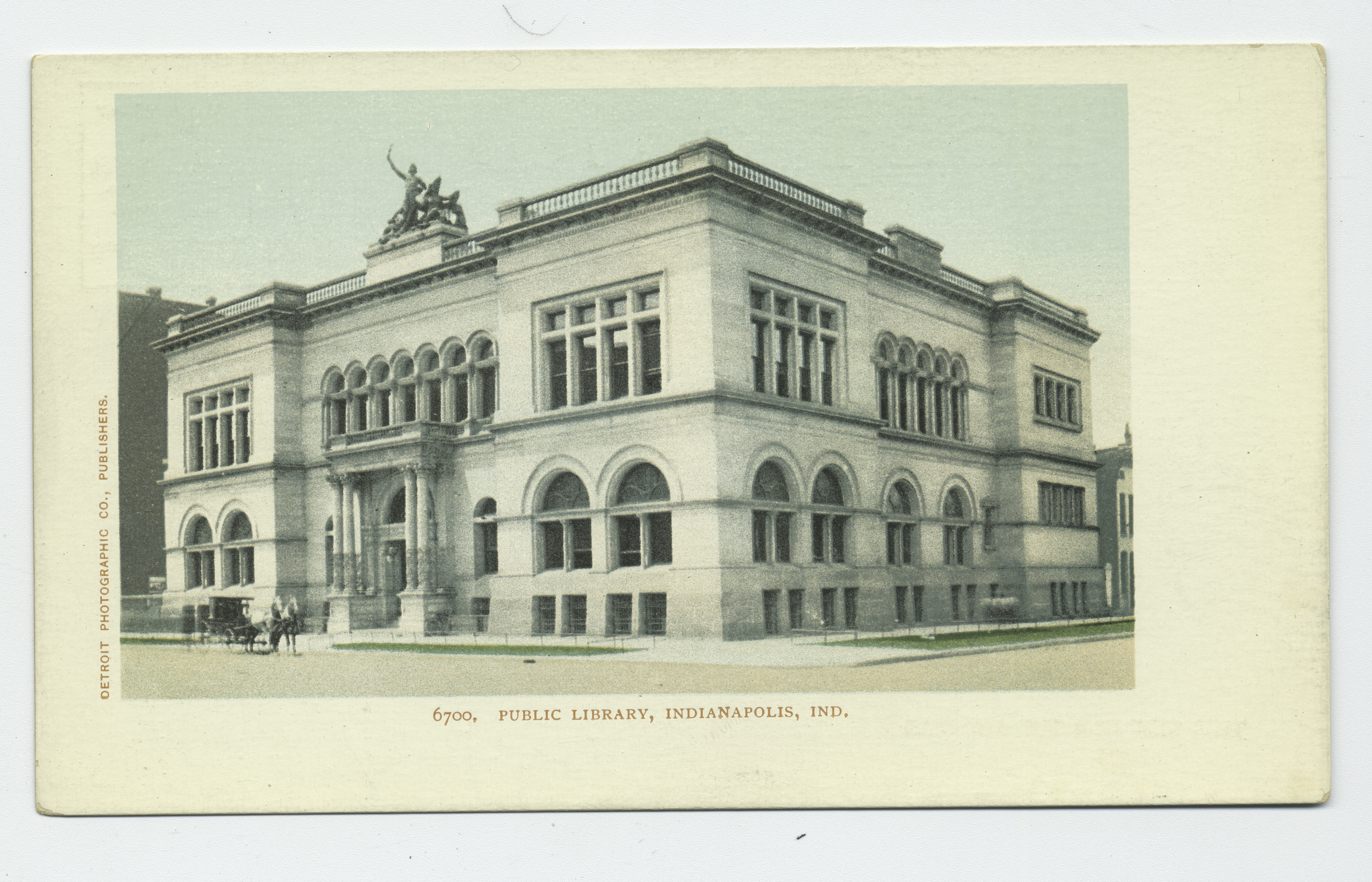
Postcard depicting the Indianapolis Public Library's location at Meridian and Ohio streets (ca. 1902–1903).

Evans served as librarian until 1878, and again from 1889 to 1892. Evans' successors were Albert B. Yohn (1878–1879), Arthur W. Tyler (1879–1883), and William deM. Hooper (1883–1889). Eliza G. Browning succeeded Evans in his second tenure, holding the position from 1892 to 1917. During her leadership, the library moved to the first building constructed solely for its purpose, located on the southwest corner of Ohio and Meridian streets in 1893, and opened its first library branch opened in 1906 on Clifton Street in the Riverside neighborhood. Between 1910 and 1914, another five library branches were built with $120,000 donated by Andrew Carnegie. As of 2020, two of these libraries—East Washington and Spades Park—are still active branches. Before her resignation, Browning initiated work on a new Central Library located partially on land donated by Hoosier poet James Whitcomb Riley in 1911.

Charles E. Rush succeeded Browning, serving as librarian from 1917 until 1927. His successors were Luther L. Dickerson (1927–1944) and Marian McFadden (1944–1955). During this period, eight new branch libraries were opened, and the system's collections expanded to include films, newspapers on microfilm, and phonorecords. Additionally, bookmobile service began in 1952.

Harold J. Sander, who served as director from 1956 to 1971, presided over the opening of ten new branch libraries and undertook a reorganization of the Central Library in 1960 that departmentalized services. Before 1966, the library system served only those areas of the city under the jurisdiction of Indianapolis Public Schools, leaving more than 200,000 Marion County residents without access to free public library services. From 1966 to 1968, the newly formed Marion County Public Library Board contracted with the Indianapolis Public Library for service to county residents. In 1968, the Indianapolis Board of School Commissioners relinquished responsibility for library service, allowing the city and county library systems to merge. This established the Indianapolis–Marion County Public Library as a municipal corporation serving all Marion County residents, except for Beech Grove and Speedway.

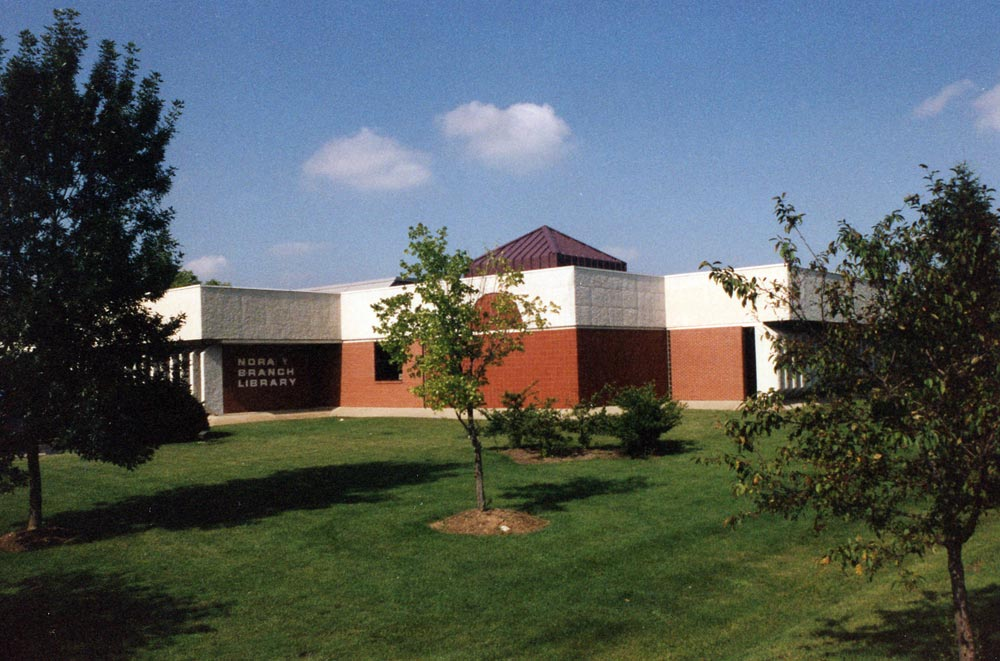
Established in 1971, Nora Branch Library (pictured in 1998) was one in a wave of new branch openings following the formation of the Marion County Public Library Board in 1966.

Raymond E. Gnat succeeded Sander as library director in 1972. Essential library services were computerized between 1982 and 1991. By the early 1990s, the public library system encompassed 21 branches and three bookmobiles. In 1991, some seven million items were circulated among 470,000 registered borrowers and 3.4 million inquiries were answered. At this time, the library collection contained nearly 1.7 million materials staffed by 410 full-time employees. Ed Szynaka served as director from 1994 until 2003, presiding over capital improvements to eight branch libraries, including the relocation of the Broad Ripple Branch to the Glendale Town Center. The Glendale Branch opened in 2000 as the first full-service library at a major shopping center in the U.S. Laura Johnston served in an interim role from 2003 to 2004 until the appointment of Linda Mielke, who served from 2004 until 2007. She was succeeded by Laura Bramble. Following the Great Recession and a successful state ballot measure to cap property taxes in 2008, the Indianapolis Public Library faced a budget shortfall of $4 million in 2010. After considering closing six branches, officials decided to reduce branch hours by 26 percent, layoff 37 employees, and increase fines.

Jackie Nytes served as the chief executive officer from 2012 until 2021, when she stepped down from her position. During Nytes' leadership in 2014, the library board received approval from the Indianapolis City-County Council to issue $58.5 million in bonds to renovate and relocate existing branches and construct new ones during the following decade. In April 2016, the boards of the Indianapolis and the Beech Grove public libraries voted to merge. Beech Grove's library becoming the twenty-third branch of the Indianapolis system on June 1, 2016. In 2021, the Indianapolis Public Library terminated its late fee policy, waiving fines for more than 87,000 accounts for overdue items.

Jackie Nytes resigned from the position of CEO following protests and allegations of racism. John Helling was named interim chief executive officer at the August 23, 2021. Helling served until March 2022, when Nichelle Hayes was appointed as interim CEO. Although Hayes was a finalist for the position of CEO, a divided board appointed Gregory Hill to the position on April 24, 2023.

== Services ==
=== Website and digital holdings ===
The library website provides access to the library's catalog, online collections, digital archives, and subscription databases. The Bibliocommons catalog allows users to search the library's holdings of books, journals, and other materials. It also enables cardholders to request books from any branch and have them delivered to any branch for pickup.

IndyPL gives cardholders free access from home to thousands of current and historical magazines, newspapers, journals, and reference books in subscription databases, including EBSCOhost, which contains the full text of major magazines, the Indianapolis Star (1903–present), and the New York Times (1851–present). E-books (including downloadable audiobooks) are more popular than physical items, with five electronic resources being checked out for each one printed book, CD, or other physical resource. In 2023, the most checked-out item in the IPL system was electronic copies of The New Yorker magazine, which were borrowed 6,800 times; the most popular e-book was Spare.

The Indianapolis Public Library Digital Archives (Digital Indy) is a freely accessible database of over 200,000 digital images and recordings of cultural and historical interest. The collections in this archive highlight Indianapolis schools, arts organizations, neighborhoods, governmental institutions, and other groups.

The library offers the Encyclopedia of Indianapolis, a free-access, web-based encyclopedia providing comprehensive social, cultural, economic, historical, political, and physical descriptions of Indianapolis. The updated Encyclopedia of Indianapolis was created in partnership with The Polis Center at Indiana University Indianapolis and several other major historical and cultural institutions and builds on the information featured in the original print encyclopedia published by The Polis Center in 1994.

=== Shared System ===
The public library offers library services to Indianapolis schools and museums through its Shared System services. The system allows members and students to use their IndyPL library cards to borrow materials from their library as well as IndyPL's collection through the library's catalog. Local museums and special libraries sharing the catalog include the Eiteljorg Museum of American Indians and Western Art, the Indiana Medical History Museum, the Indianapolis Museum of Art at Newfields, the BJE Maurer Jewish Community Library, and Riley Hospital for Children.

== Central Library ==
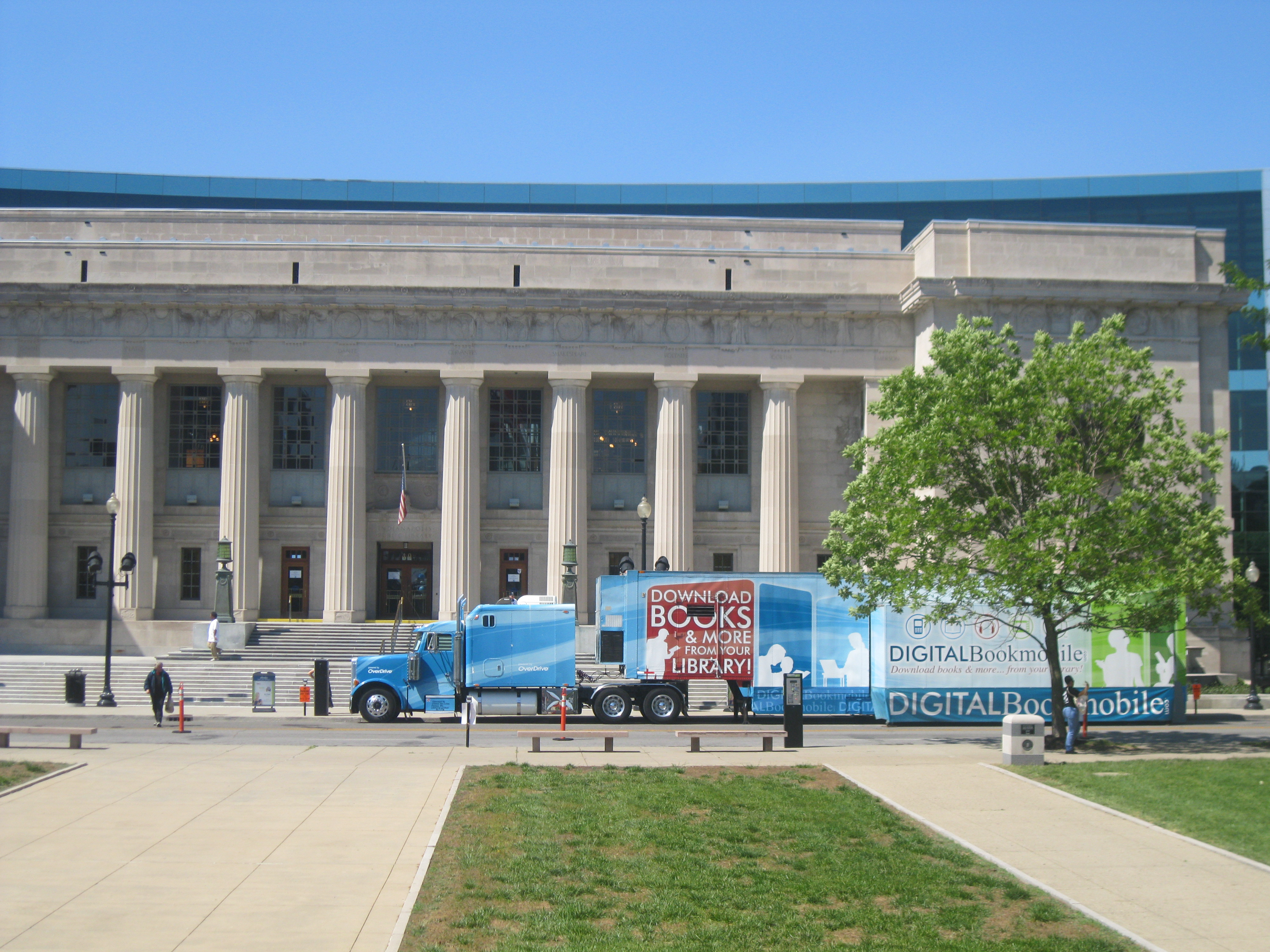
Indianapolis Public Library Digital Bookmobile outside Central Library

Located in downtown Indianapolis, the Central Library building was designed by architect Paul Philippe Cret (with Zantzinger, Borie and Medary). The library opened in 1917 and was added to the National Register of Historic Places in 1975. Central Library has undergone many renovations and expansions throughout its history; the largest and most recent project was completed by Woollen, Molzan and Partners in 2007.

=== Special collections ===
Central Library's sixth floor includes the Indianapolis Special Collections Room, named for newspaper executive Nina Mason Pulliam. The collection contains a variety of archival adult and children's materials, both fiction and nonfiction books by local authors, photographs, scrapbooks, typescripts, manuscripts, autographed editions, letters, newspapers, magazines, and realia. The collection features Kurt Vonnegut, May Wright Sewall, the Woollen family, James Whitcomb Riley, and Booth Tarkington.

The 3,800-square-foot (350 m^{2}) Center for Black Literature & Culture opened at Central Library in 2017, provided by $1.3 million in grant funding from the Lilly Endowment. The center houses some 10,000 books, magazines, DVDs, and e-books with plans to quadruple the collection to 40,000 items over the next five years. The center's window banners pay tribute to local Black figures, including former Indiana Fever basketball player, Tamika Catchings, poet and playwright, Mari Evans, and Congresswoman Julia Carson. Phase II of the project commenced after an Indianapolis City-County Council committee issued $5.3 million in bonds for facility upgrades and projects in July 2020.

In 2019, the Indianapolis Public Library, in partnership with Indy Pride and others, dedicated the Chris Gonzalez Collection, named for LGBTQ activist and Indiana Youth Group co-founder Christopher T. Gonzalez. The collection of 7,000 items relating to local and national LGBTQ+ history and culture was merged with the Central Library collection.

== Branches ==
The Indianapolis Public Library system operates 24 branch libraries and provides bookmobile services.

| Name | Est. | Built | Location | Notes | Image |
|---|---|---|---|---|---|
| Beech Grove | 1951 | 1953 | 39.7219°N 86.0946°W | The branch is located in the city of Beech Grove. It was absorbed by the Indianapolis Public Library in 2016. | |
| College Avenue | 1924 | 2000 | 39.8320°N 86.1455°W | Until its relocation in 2000, the library was named the Broadway Branch. | |
| Decatur | 1967 | 1990 | 39.6868°N 86.2786°W | Until its relocation in 1990, the library was named the Marwood Branch. | |
| Eagle | 1960 | 2019 | 39.8262°N 86.2554°W | | |
| East 38th Street | 1957 | 2003 | 39.8257°N 86.0762°W | Until its relocation in 2003, the library was named the Emerson Branch. | |
| East Washington | 1911 | 1911 | 39.7686°N 86.1158°W | Established as Indianapolis Public Library Branch No. 3, it is one of two Carnegie library buildings in Indianapolis still used for its original purpose. | |
| Fort Ben | 2023 | 2023 | 39.8558°N 86.0034°W | The branch is located in the city of Lawrence. | |
| Franklin Road | 1969 | 2000 | 39.6875°N 86.0192°W | Until its relocation in 2000, the library was named the Wanamaker Branch. | |
| Garfield Park | 1918 | 1965 | 39.7319°N 86.1400°W | Until 2011, the library was named the Shelby Branch. | |
| Glendale | 1949 | 2024 | 39.8693°N 86.1066°W | The library was established as the Broad Ripple Branch, adopting the Glendale name when it relocated to a storefront at Glendale Town Center in 2000. A new standalone library branch opened in 2024. | |
| Haughville | 1896 | 2003 | 39.7744°N 86.1974°W | | |
| InfoZone | 2000 | 2000 | 39.8110°N 86.1580°W | The branch is located on the second floor of The Children's Museum of Indianapolis. | |
| Irvington | 1903 | 2001 | 39.7703°N 86.0709°W | The branch was established at the Bona Thompson Memorial Center. It was known as the Brown Branch from 1956 until its relocation in 2001. | |
| Lawrence | 1967 | 1983 | 39.8979°N 86.0338°W | | |
| Martindale–Brightwood | 1901 | 2020 | 39.8031°N 86.1027°W | Until its relocation in 2020, the library was named the Brightwood Branch. | |
| Michigan Road | 2018 | 2018 | 39.8687°N 86.2013°W | | |
| Nora | 1971 | 1971 | 39.9130°N 86.1415°W | | |
| Pike | 1967 | 1986 | 39.8748°N 86.2588°W | Until its relocation in 1986, the library was named the Westlane Branch. | |
| Southport | 1967 | 1974 | 39.6509°N 86.1175°W | | |
| Spades Park | 1912 | 1912 | 39.7849°N 86.1289°W | Established as Indianapolis Public Library Branch No. 6, it is one of two Carnegie library buildings in Indianapolis still used for its original purpose. | |
| Warren | 1974 | 1974 | 39.7961°N 85.9955°W | | |
| Wayne | 1969 | 1983 | 39.7612°N 86.2898°W | | |
| West Indianapolis | 1897 | 1986 | 39.7507°N 86.1946°W | | |
| West Perry | 2021 | 2021 | 39.6659°N 86.1876°W | | |

== See also ==
- List of libraries
- Government of Indianapolis
- Hawthorne Branch Library No. 2

== Notes ==
1.This is based on the 2019 population estimate of Marion County, Indiana, subtracting the populations of the Town of Speedway, Indiana. Residents of Speedway are ineligible to be cardholders of the Indianapolis Public Library as the town maintains its own public library.
