= Acacia: The War with the Mein =

Book by David Anthony Durham

Acacia: The War With the Mein
- Cover of first edition (hardcover)
- Author: David Anthony Durham
- Language: English
- Series: Acacia Trilogy
- Genre: Fantasy
- Publisher: Doubleday
- Publication date: 2007
- Publication place: United States
- Media type: Print (hardback & paperback)
- Pages: 592
- ISBN: 0-385-50606-6
- OCLC: 71312844
- Dewey Decimal: 813/.6 22
- LC Class: PS3554.U677 A33 2007
- Followed by: The Other Lands

Acacia: The War with the Mein is a 2007 fantasy novel by American author David Anthony Durham. It marks his first foray into epic fantasy, although the novel shares some characteristics of his other works such as the historical novel Pride of Carthage. It was followed by two sequels, The Other Lands in 2009 and The Sacred Band in 2011.

Acacia: The War with the Mein has been translated into French, German, Italian, Polish, Portuguese, Brazilian Portuguese, Russian, Spanish, Swedish and has been published in the United Kingdom.

== Premise ==
The novel is notable for the complexity of Durham's imagined setting, one in which political and economic forces influence the fates of the ethnically and culturally diverse population. Leodan Akaran, ruler of the Known World, has inherited generations of peace and prosperity, won ages ago by his ancestors. He presides over an empire called Acacia, after the idyllic island from which he governs. The four royal children of the Akaran dynasty know little of the world outside their opulent island paradise, including the dark realities of drugs and human trafficking, on which their status depends. Leodan hopes that he might change this, but powerful forces stand in his way. When a deadly assassin sent from an exiled people called the Mein strikes at the heart of Acacia, Leodan puts into motion a plan for his children to escape. Forced to flee to distant corners, the royal children must navigate a web of hidden allegiances, illicit trade, foreign invaders, and ancient magic that will challenge their very notion of who they are.

== Awards and honors ==
- Winner of the John W. Campbell Award for Best New Writer of Science Fiction and Fantasy
- One of Kirkus Reviews Ten Best Works of Fiction in 2007
- One of Publishers Weekly's Best Books of 2007
- Nominated for a Romantic Times 2007 Reviewers' Choice Award
- A Fantasy Magazine Recommended Fantasy Read of 2007

== Film adaptation ==
In 2008 it was optioned for adaptation as a feature film by Relativity Media, with Michael De Luca to produce and Andrew Grant to write the screenplay.
