= Sixbeastsandtwomonkeys =

2009 series of sculptures by Peter Shelton in Los Angeles, California, U.S.

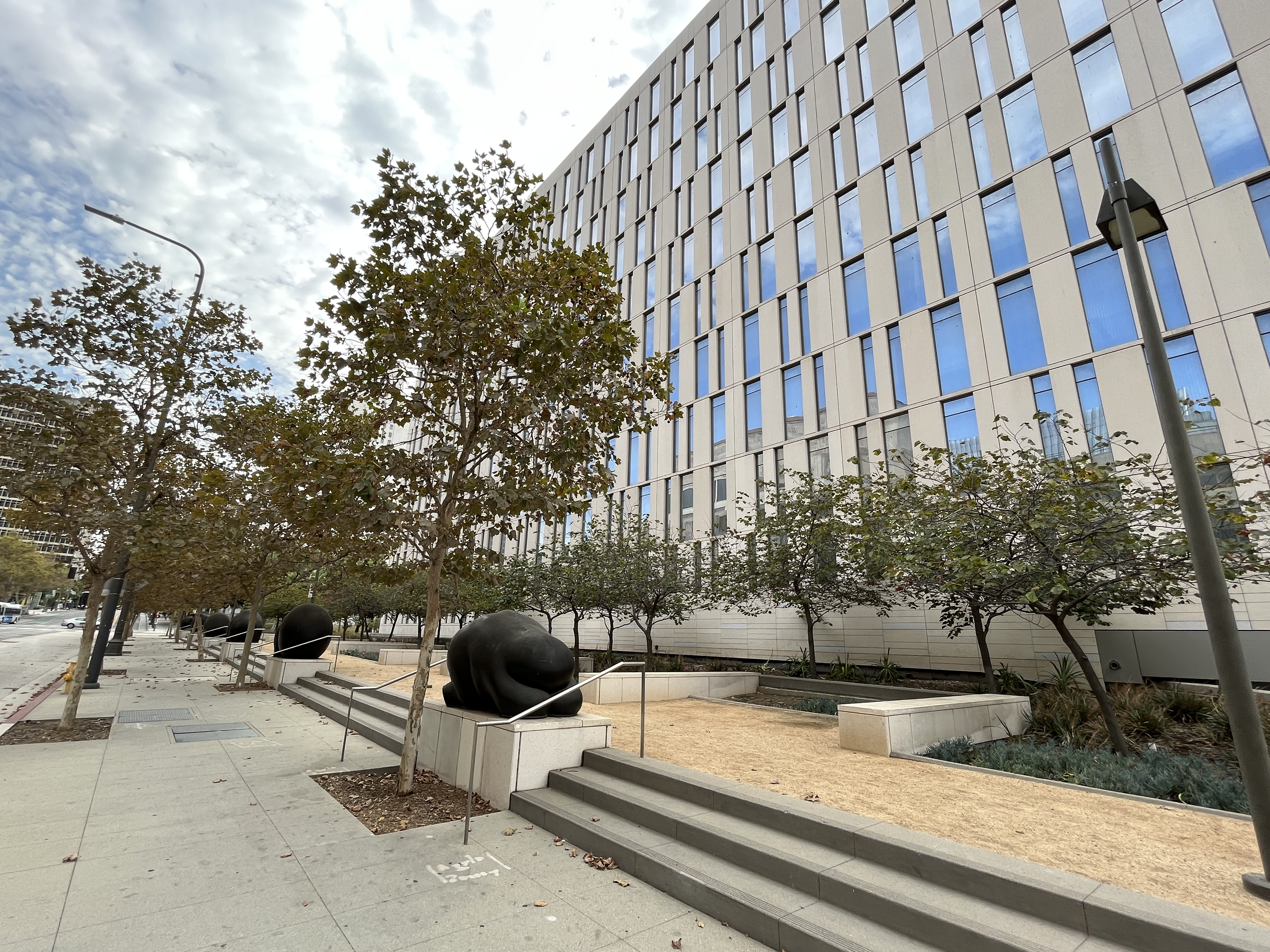
- Part of the sculpture series, 2022
- Artist: Peter Shelton
- Medium: Bronze sculpture
- Subject: Animals
- Location: 1411 Spring St., Los Angeles, California

sixbeastsandtwomonkeys (2009) is a series of eight bronze sculptures by artist Peter Shelton, commissioned for the Police Administration Building in downtown Los Angeles, in the U.S. state of California. The sculptures depict six beasts and two monkeys.

The eight semi-abstract sculptures, each on its own pedestal, are placed along the sidewalk on Spring Street directly opposite the LA Times building.

The cost of the project was created through the Los Angeles' Percent-For-Art program and cost $512,000. In 2010, Americans for the Arts included it on the list of the forty best public artworks in the U.S.

== Reception ==
After the installation of the eight sculptures in Los Angeles Police Plaza, the active police chief at the time, William J. Bratton said the sculptures looked like "some sort of cow splat".
