= Indianapolis Public Library Branch No. 3 =

Historic library building in Indiana, US

- U.S. National Register of Historic Places
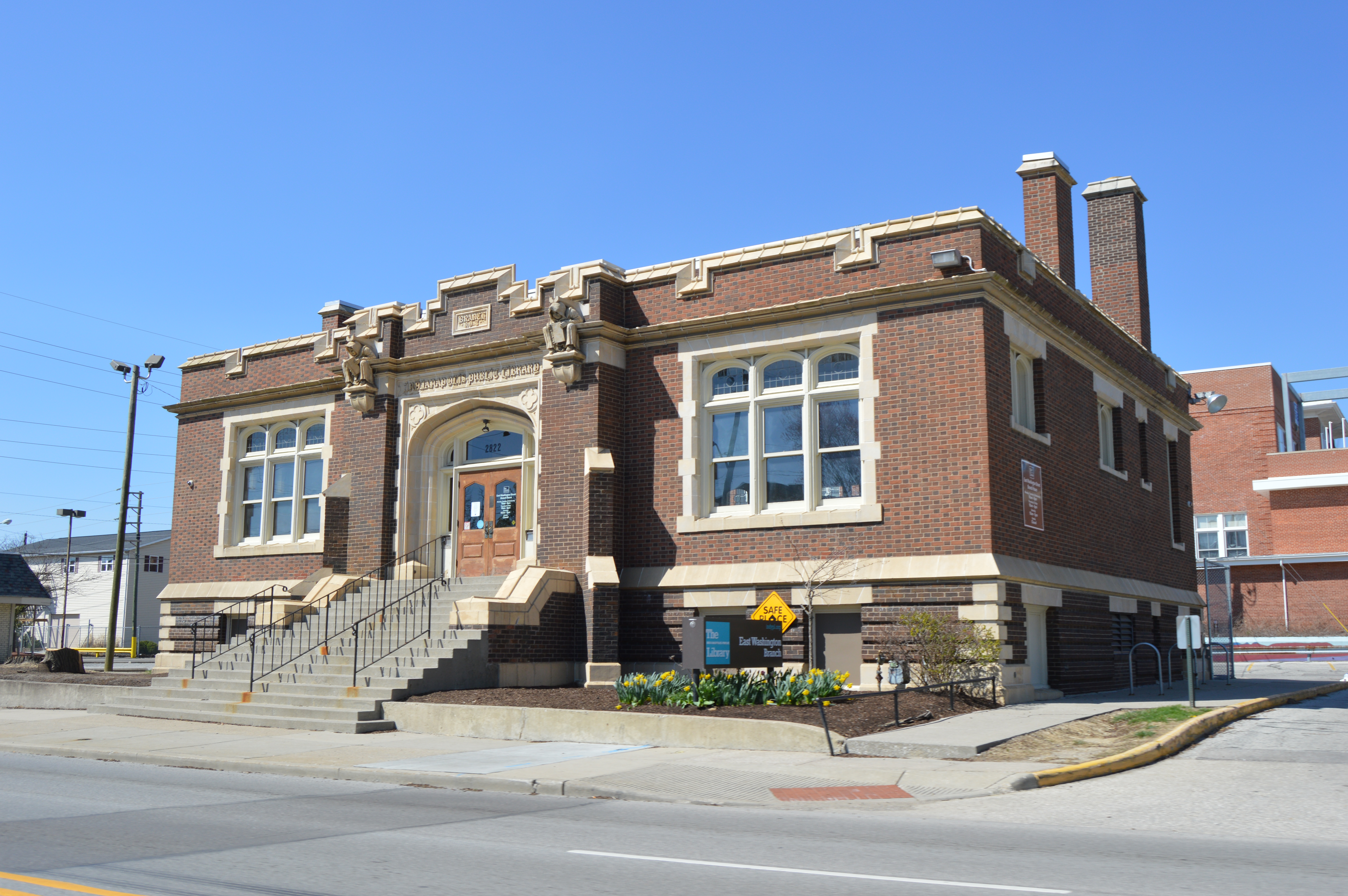
- Indianapolis Public Library Branch No. 3, April 2016

- Location within Indianapolis Location within Indiana Location within the United States
- Location: 2822 E. Washington St., Indianapolis, Indiana
- Coordinates: 39°46′07″N 86°06′57″W
- Area: Less than 1 acre (0.40 ha)
- Built: 1909-1911
- Architect: Foltz and Parker
- Architectural style: Tudor Revival
- NRHP reference No.: 16000077
- Added to NRHP: March 15, 2016

Indianapolis Public Library Branch No. 3, also known as East Washington Branch Library, is a historic Carnegie library located in Indianapolis, Indiana. It was built between 1909 and 1911, and is a one-story, rectangular, Tudor Revival style dark red brick building on a raised basement. It has a truncated hipped roof behind a castellated parapet, and features terra cotta details and two hooded monk sculptures by Alexander Sangernebo. It was one of five libraries constructed from the $120,000 the Carnegie Foundation gave the city of Indianapolis in 1909 to be used towards the construction of six branch libraries. The other buildings include the Indianapolis Public Branch Library No. 6 (now the Spades Park Branch Library) and the Hawthorne Branch Library No. 2. A full renovation of the library was carried out in 1978 at a cost of $200,000. During a 2003 renovation, the interior was recarpeted and the metal entry doors, which were put in during the 1978 renovation, were replaced with custom oak doors modeled after the original doors. Indianapolis Public Library Branch No. 3 retains a high level of architectural integrity and continues to serve the community in its original role. The library remains in operation as the East Washington Branch of the Indianapolis Public Library.

The building was listed on the National Register of Historic Places in 2016. The library was closed for renovation in 2016 and reopened in February 2017. The $2.4 million renovations included an addition at the rear of building that included a 2,200-square-foot (200 m^{2}) computer room and an elevator to make the library compliant with the American Disabilities Act, the last branch in the library system to become compliant. The project also created community space in the basement and updated the restrooms.

== See also ==
- List of Carnegie libraries in Indiana
- National Register of Historic Places listings in Center Township, Marion County, Indiana
