= The Sacred Band (novel) =

2011 novel by David Anthony Durham

- Cover of first edition (hardcover)
- Author: David Anthony Durham
- Language: English
- Series: Acacia Trilogy
- Genre: Fantasy fiction novel
- Publisher: Doubleday
- Publication date: 2011
- Publication place: United States
- Media type: Print (hardback & paperback)
- Pages: 576 pp
- ISBN: 0-307-73968-6
- Preceded by: The Other Lands

The Sacred Band is a 2011 novel by American author David Anthony Durham, published by Doubleday. It concludes his Acacia Trilogy, which began with Acacia: The War With The Mein and was followed by The Other Lands.

== Plot summary ==
Acacia: The Sacred Band follows the Akaran siblings as they each deal with a different theater in the coming war with the Auldek, invaders from the Other Lands that are marching across the north pole and down into Acacia.

Queen Corinn has worked an act of magic, resurrecting a character from an earlier book to aid her. The person she has brought back, however, doesn't wish to be molded to her needs. Mena Akaran has gone north with the small army sent out to have first contact with the invaders. The novel chronicles the brutal, Arctic campaign fought on the ice and in the skies above it. Dariel Akaran, still in the Other Lands (Ushen Brae) finds himself dealing with the turmoil of the Auldek's having abandoned their slaves, the Quota children that have been a feature of all three books.

There are also a host of minor characters. Rialus Neptos is dragged along with the Auldek as they invade his homeland. Kelis returns to Acacia, having retrieved Aliver Akaran's daughter, Shen. Barad the Lesser continues to struggle with the spell Corinn has trapped him with. Also, there is another invasion to deal with. The Santoth sorcerers have found a way to break their long exile, to dire consequences. All of the major plot threads are resolved in this volume.

This series is notable for the complexity of Durham's imagined world, one in which political, economic, mythological and morally ambiguous forces all influence the fates of the ethnically and culturally diverse population.

== Publication history ==
- 2011, USA, Doubleday ISBN 0307739686, Pub date October 4, 2011, hardcover
- The Sacred Band has been published in France by Le Pré aux Clercs as L'alliance sacrée.
- It is scheduled for publication in German and in Portuguese.
- The audio version is narrated by Dick Hill.
