= The Other Lands =

2009 novel by David Anthony Durham

- Author: David Anthony Durham
- Language: English
- Series: Acacia Trilogy
- Genre: Fantasy novel
- Publisher: Doubleday
- Publication date: 15 September 2009
- Publication place: United States
- Media type: Print (hardcover)
- ISBN: 0-385-52332-7
- Preceded by: Acacia: The War with the Mein
- Followed by: The Sacred Band

The Other Lands is a fantasy novel by American author David Anthony Durham. It is a sequel to Acacia: The War With The Mein. It was followed by the sequel The Sacred Band.

== Plot introduction ==
=== Explanation of the novel's title ===
The Other Lands refers to the land of the Lothan Aklun, as it is called in The Known World, primary setting of the first novel. According to the summary, we are given our first view of The Other Lands in this book.

== Plot summary ==
Several years have passed since the demise of Hanish Mein. Corinn Akaran rules with an iron grip on the Known World's many races. She hones her skills in sorcery by studying The Book of Elenet, and she dotes on her young son, Aaden – Hanish's child – raising him to be her successor. Mena Akaran, still the warrior princess she became fighting the eagle god Maeben, has been battling the monsters released by the Santoth's corrupted magic. In her hunt she discovers a creature wholly unexpected, one that awakens emotions in her she has long suppressed. And Dariel Akaran, once a brigand of the Outer Isles, has devoted his labors to rebuilding the ravaged empire brick by brick. Each of the Akaran royals is finding their way in the post-war world. But the queen's peace is difficult to maintain, and things are about to change.

When the League brings news of upheavals in the Other Lands, Corinn sends Dariel across the Grey Slopes as her emissary. From the moment he sets foot on that distant continent, he finds a chaotic swirl of treachery, ancient grudges, intrigue and exoticism. He comes face to face with the slaves his empire has long sold into bondage. His arrival ignites a firestorm that once more puts the Known World in threat of invasion. A massive invasion. One that dwarfs anything the Akarans have yet faced.

== Publication history ==
- Audiobook narrated by Dick Hill
- 2009, USA, Doubleday ISBN 0-385-52332-7, Pub date 15 September 2009, hardcover

== Sources, references, external links, quotations ==
- Official website
