= Nichelle Hayes =

American library director

- Education: Indiana University, MLS
- Occupation: Librarian
- Board member of: Indiana Black Librarians Network, President 2018-2020 Black Caucus of the American Library Association (BCALA), President 2022-2024
- Awards: Library Journal Movers & Shakers, 2021

Nichelle M. Hayes is a librarian from Indianapolis. She led the Center for Black Literature & Culture (CBLC) at the Indianapolis Public Library and later served as the interim CEO of the library. Hayes was not hired as CEO. The decision resulted in protests from supportive library staff and community members.

== Early life and education ==
Hayes was named after Nichelle Nichols, one of the first Black actresses to play a character on Star Trek: The Original Series.

She earned her Library Science degree from Indiana University and participated in Indiana Librarians Leading in Diversity Fellowship Program (I-ILID).

== Career ==
As a librarian, Hayes has specialized in genealogy, special collections, Black history, and library leadership.

Hayes started her employment at the Indianapolis Public Library as the founder and director of the Center for Black Literature & Culture in 2017. In 2022, with unanimous support from the board, she was appointed to the position of Interim CEO of the Indianapolis Public Library. Hayes followed John Helling's term as Interim CEO.

Behind closed doors, the library's board of trustees appointed George Hill to the position of CEO instead of hiring Hayes. The decision faced opposition from library employees, union members, and the community.

Hayes continued her employment at the public library following the appointment of Hill, but later left the library to pursue other opportunities.

In June 2024, Hayes began working as the Interim Executive Director of the Hurston/Wright Foundation.

== Community roles ==
Hayes served president of the Indiana Black Librarians Network from 2018 to 2020. She also served as the vice president and president elect of the Black Caucus of the American Library Association (BCALA) from 2020 to 2021. She then served as president of the organization from 2022 to 2024.

== Awards and recognition ==
Hayes received the Library Journal Movers & Shakers recognition in 2021.
