= Gabriel's Story =

2001 Western novel by David Anthony Durham

- Cover of first edition (hardcover)
- Author: David Anthony Durham
- Language: English
- Genre: Historical fiction novel
- Publisher: Doubleday
- Publication date: 2001
- Publication place: United States
- Media type: Print (hard and paperback)
- Pages: 304 pp
- ISBN: 978-0-385-49814-2
- OCLC: 43567440
- Dewey Decimal: 813/.6 21
- LC Class: PS3554.U677 G33 2001

Gabriel's Story is a novel by American author David Anthony Durham published by Doubleday in 2001.

== Plot summary ==
Durham made his literary debut with a novel which, in the tradition of Cormac McCarthy's All the Pretty Horses, views the American West through an original lens. Set in the 1870s, the novel tells the tale of Gabriel Lynch, an African American youth who settles with his family in the plains of Kansas. Dissatisfied with the drudgery of homesteading and growing increasingly disconnected from his family, Gabriel forsakes the farm for a life of higher adventure. Thus begins a forbidding trek into a terrain of austere beauty, a journey begun in hope, but soon laced with danger and propelled by a cast of brutal characters. By writing about African American characters, Durham gave voice to a population seldom included in our Western lore.

== Reception ==
Maria Russo wrote in The New York Times that the "novel has flaws", and "aspects of the plot don't quite make sense ... and some of its machinations strain credibility". She also criticized the dialogue for sounding a "little too modern", but regardless, she says the book is "both artistically impressive and emotionally satisfying".

== Awards and honors ==
- Legacy Award for Debut Fiction from the Hurston/Wright Foundation
- 2002 Alex Award from the American Library Association
- 2001 First Novel Award from the Black Caucus of the American Library Association
- The New York Times Notable Book
- Los Angeles Times Best of 2001
