= Eliza G. Browning =

Indianapolis librarian

Eliza Gordon Browning
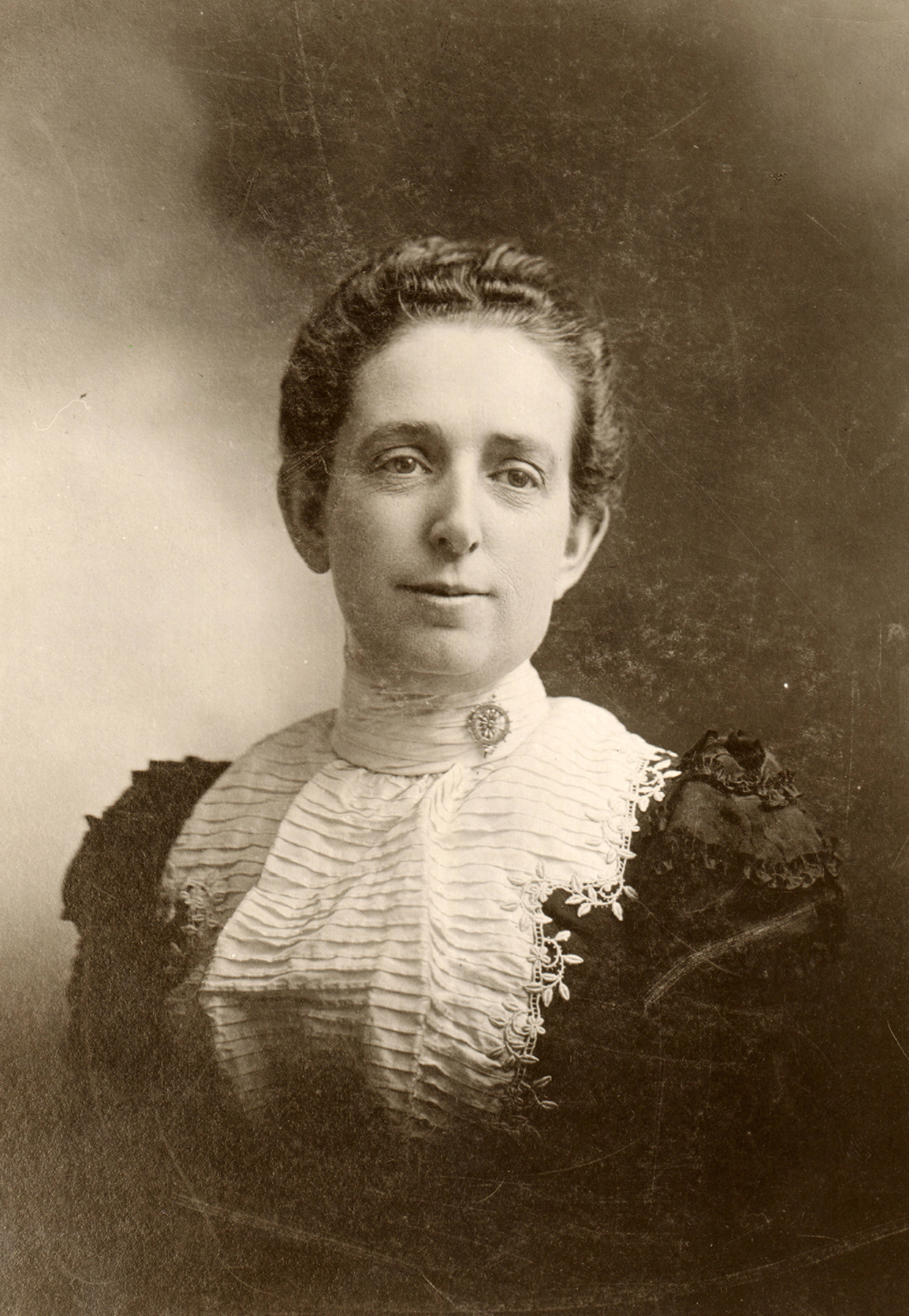
- Born: November 23, 1856; Fortville, Indiana
- Died: May 17, 1927 (aged 70); Indianapolis, Indiana
- Burial place: Crown Hill Cemetery, Indianapolis, IN
- Known for: Librarianship and overseeing the construction of the Central Library in Indianapolis, Indiana

Eliza Gordon Browning (September 23, 1856 - May 17, 1927) oversaw the construction of the Central Library in Indianapolis, Indiana. She was the first female member of the Indiana Historical Society and founder of the General Arthur St. Clair Daughters of the American Revolution chapter.

== Early life ==
Eliza Browning was born in Fortville, Indiana on September 23, 1856, to Woodville and Mary Ann (Brown) Browning. The family moved to Indianapolis shortly after her birth. Browning attended public school in Indianapolis.

== Career ==
In May 1880, Browning joined the staff of the Indianapolis Public Library as an apprentice, and assisted with moving the Library from the Circle to the Alvord House (at Pennsylvania and Ohio Streets). In May 1880 Browning became an apprentice at the library. was appointed as a junior assistant and between 1888 and 1889, she served as the interim acting librarian between two administrations. In May 1892, she was appointed chief librarian, a position she held until July 1917, when she voluntarily became assistant librarian to her successor, Charles E. Rush. In 1893, Browning oversaw the moving of the Library to the first building constructed primarily for its use located on Meridian and Ohio Streets. Browning launched the creation of branch libraries across the city, with the first branch opening in 1896, and five more branches opened between 1910 and 1914 with a $100,000 grant from Andrew Carnegie. In 1917, Browning oversaw the fundraising for and construction of the present Central Library location. Browning worked for the Indianapolis Public library for 47 years. Browning believed the library should be "...a live thing in the whole town. There should be heart cooperation between the library and community."

Browning was admitted as the first female member of the Indiana Historical Society. She was active in the Indiana Library Association, the American Library Association, the Fortnightly Literary Club of Indianapolis, the Society of Indiana Pioneers, and served as state historian for the Daughters of the American Revolution. Browning served as joint editor of the Year Book of the Daughters of the American Revolution in Indiana with Harriet Foster and with Mrs. John Newman Carey, she co-founded the General Arthur St. Clair Chapter in Indianapolis of the Daughters of the American Revolution. She was on the board for the Girl Scouts, YWCA, and the Indianapolis Children's Museum.

== Death and legacy ==
The chapter of the Daughters of the American Revolution that Browning founded, donated an exhibit case in her honor to the Indianapolis Public Library. Browning worked at the library until her death May 18, 1927. Leading up to her death, Browning had been in poor health for several months, but ultimately passed at Methodist Hospital in Indianapolis. Central Library and all library branches and associated services closed during her funeral.
