= David Anthony Durham =

American novelist

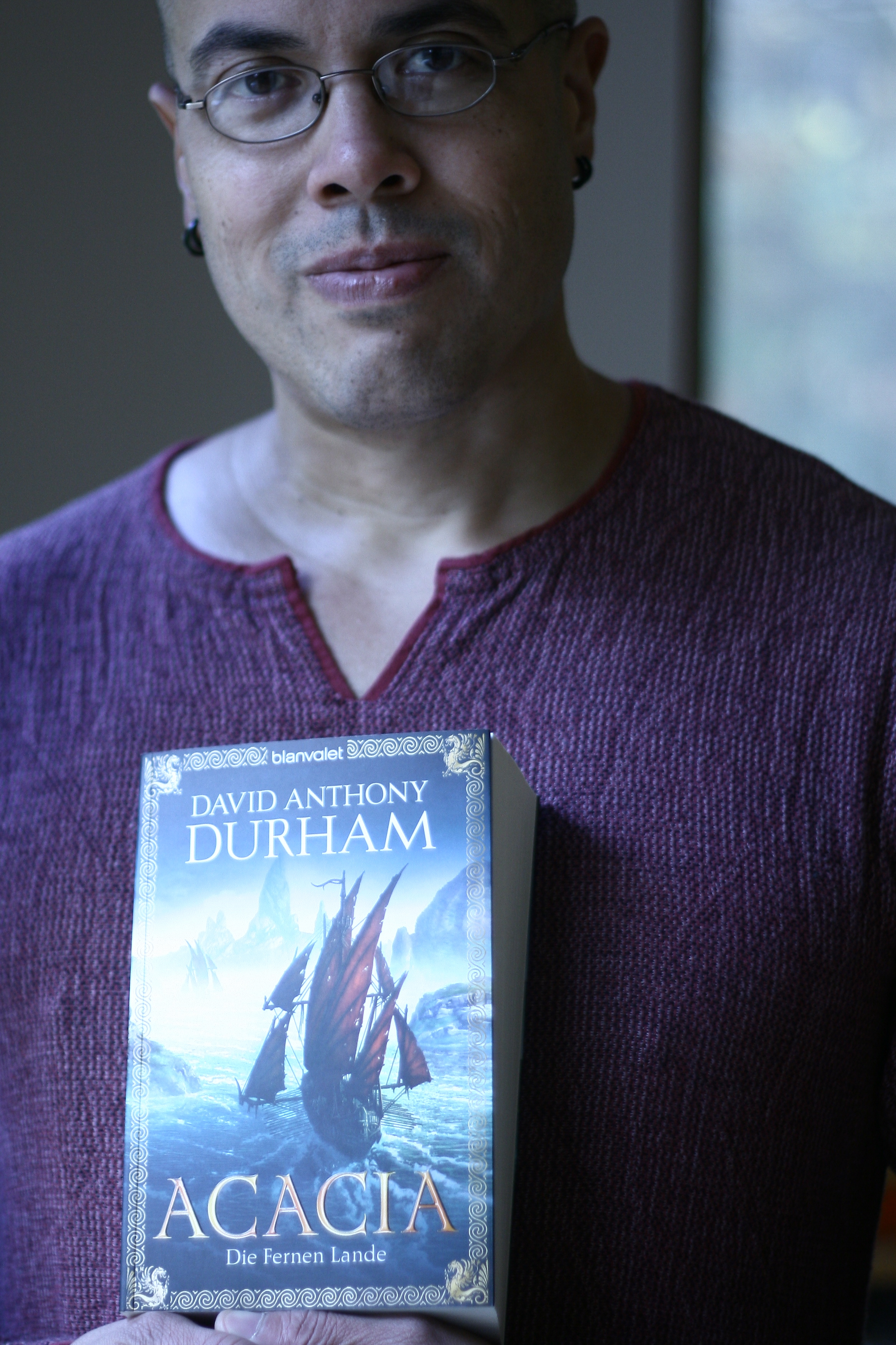
- October 2012
- Born: New York City, U.S.
- Education: University of Maryland, College Park (MFA)
- Occupations: Novelist, associate professor
- Website: www.davidanthonydurham.com

David Anthony Durham is an American novelist, author of historical fiction and fantasy.

Durham's first novel, Gabriel's Story, centered on African American settlers in the American West. Walk Through Darkness followed a runaway slave during the tense times leading up to the American Civil War. Pride of Carthage focused on Hannibal Barca of Ancient Carthage and his war with the Roman Republic. His novels have twice been New York Times Notable Books, won two awards from the American Library Association, and been translated into eight foreign languages. Gabriel's Story, Walk Through Darkness and Acacia: The War with the Mein are all in development as feature films. A third book, Acacia: The Sacred Band, concludes his epic fantasy Acacia Trilogy. In 2016, Durham returned to historical fiction with the publication of The Risen: A Novel of Spartacus.

== Life ==
Born to parents of Caribbean ancestry, Durham has lived in Scotland for a number of years. He has worked as an Outward Bound Instructor, and as a whitewater raft guide and kayak instructor. After receiving an MFA from the University of Maryland, College Park in 1996, he taught at the University of Maryland and University of Massachusetts Amherst. He was the MacLean Distinguished Visiting Writer at The Colorado College and was an associate professor at Cal State University, Fresno and an adjunct professor at Hampshire College. He won the Zora Neale Hurston/Richard Wright Fiction Award in 1992, the 2002 Legacy Award for Debut Fiction and was a Finalist for the 2006 Legacy Award for Fiction. In 2009, he won the John W. Campbell Award for Best New Writer. He currently teaches for the Stonecoast MFA Program in Creative Writing and was an assistant professor of creative writing at the University of Nevada, Reno before leaving to write for television.

== Novels ==
- Gabriel's Story (2001)
- Walk Through Darkness (2002)
- Pride of Carthage (2005)
- Acacia Trilogy:
1. Acacia: The War with the Mein (2007)
2. Acacia: The Other Lands (2009)
3. Acacia: The Sacred Band (2011)
- The Risen: A Novel of Spartacus (2016)
- Shadow Prince Series:
1. The Shadow Prince (2021)
2. The Longest Night in Egypt (2023)
3. A Rage of Lions (2025)

== Articles and short stories ==
- "Those About to Die" (story), (Lowball, edited by George R. R. Martin, Tor, Summer 2014).
- "Snake Up Above", "Snake In The Hole" and "Snake On Fire" (stories), (Fort Freak, edited by George R. R. Martin, Tor, June 2011).
- "An Act of Faith" (story), (It’s All Love, edited by Marita Golden, Doubleday, February 2009).
- "Appreciation: The Green House, by Mario Vargas Llosa" (book recommendation, with commentary), (The Top Ten: Writers Pick Their Favorite Books, edited by J. Peder Zane, W. W. Norton, January 2007).
- "Recommendation: A Scot’s Quair, by Lewis Grassic Gibbon" (book recommendation, with commentary), (Post Road, 2005).
- "An Act of Faith" (story), (Intimacy: Erotic Stories of Love, Lust, and Marriage by Black Men, edited by Robert Fleming, Plume, February 2004).
- "The Boy-Fish" (story), (Gumbo: A Celebration of African American Writing, edited by Marita Golden and E. Lynn Harris, Harlem Moon Press, October 2002).
- "The She-Ape and the Occasional Idealist" (short story), (QWF (UK), June/July 2000).
- "One Room Like a Cave" (story), (Staple: New Writing (UK), 1998).
- "The Boy-Fish" (story), (Catalyst, Spring 1992).
- "All the Girls Love Michael Stein" (story), (Unfettered, 2013)
