= Peter Shelton (sculptor) =

American sculptor (born 1951)

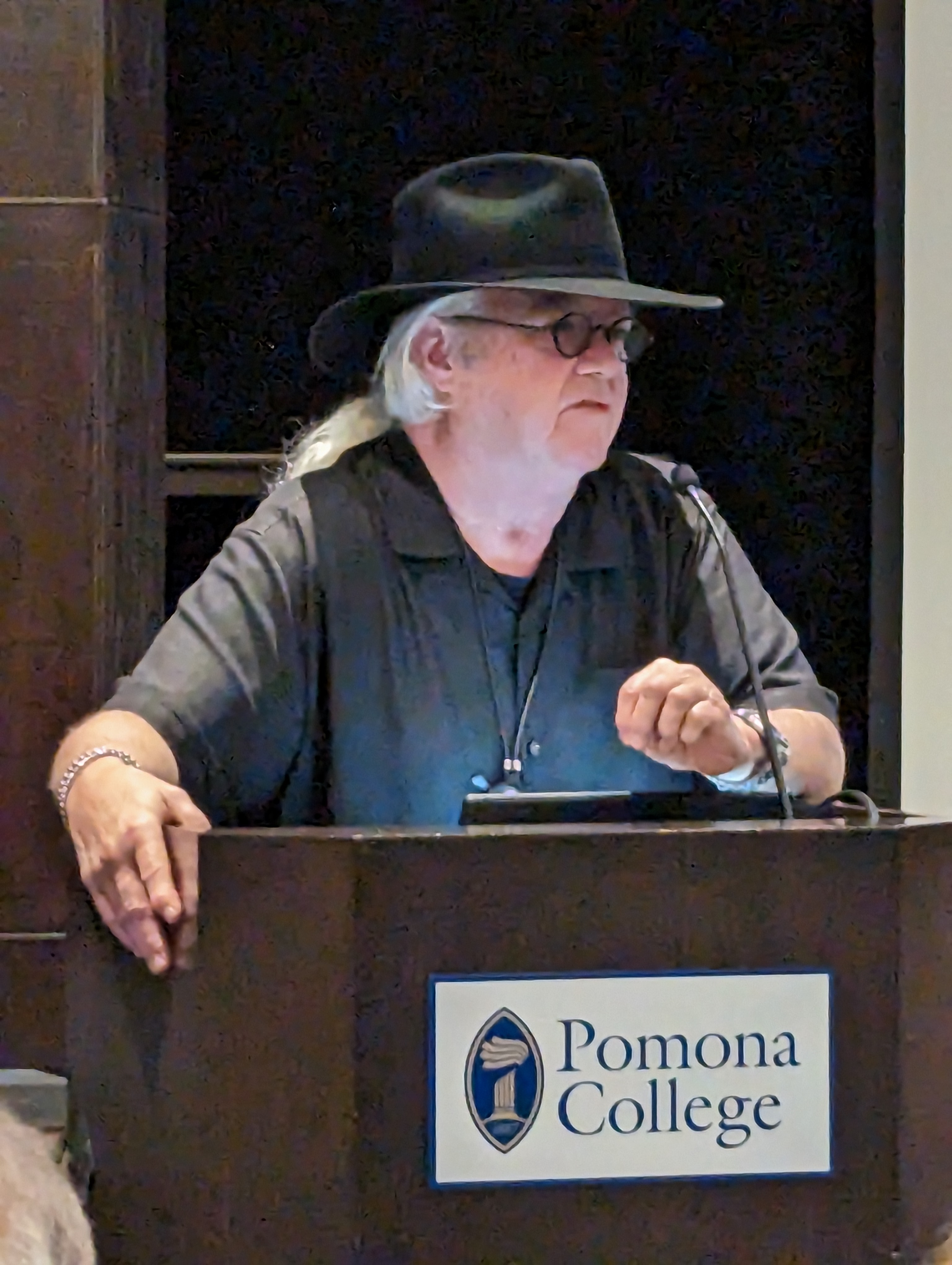
- Shelton at Pomona College in 2023
- Born: Peter Shelton; January 18, 1951 (age 75); Troy, Ohio
- Education: Pomona College, Claremont, CA; Hobart School of Welding Technology, Troy, Ohio; University of California, Los Angeles
- Known for: Sculpture
- Movement: Postminimalism

Peter Shelton is a contemporary American sculptor born in 1951 in Troy, Ohio.

Shelton works in both large and small scale, in various metals (steel, iron, lead, bronze), glass, cement, water, paint and a variety of the fiberglass and resin composites first adopted by artists in the late 1960s. His sculptures incorporate both abstracted and figurative forms along with anatomical and architectural motifs.

Shelton has exhibited extensively, including solo shows at the Whitney Museum of American Art, New York, 1987; the Los Angeles County Museum of Art, 1994; University of California, Berkeley 1998; the Irish Museum of Modern Art 1998-1999; and Portland Art Museum, 2011. He has participated in group exhibitions at the Berkeley Art Museum and Pacific Film Archive, University of California, 2009; Museum of Contemporary Art, North Miami, FL; the Allen Memorial Art Museum, Oberlin College, 2004; Museo Nacional Centro de Arte Reina Sofía, Madrid, Spain, 2004; Tate Gallery Liverpool, England, 1998; and Centre Pompidou, Paris, France, 2006.

Shelton has maintained his studio in Los Angeles since 1975. He lives in Venice, California.

== Early life and education ==
Peter Shelton was born in Troy, Ohio, on January 18, 1951.

Shelton spent his early school years in Tempe, Arizona. He was a pre-medical student at Pomona College, Pomona, CA studying sociology, anthropology and theatre, before he received his B.A. in Fine Art in 1973. Shelton went on to earn a trade certificate in welding from the Hobart School of Welding Technology in Troy, Ohio, in 1974, and his M.F.A. from the University of California, Los Angeles in 1979.

== Work ==
Shelton's biography page at the Getty Museum notes that he "draws from a vocabulary both figural and abstract, anatomical and architectural."

Shelton himself describes his work as follows:

I like to think of my work as a threshold between in and out, object and space, heavy and light. How far away from a corner in a room is it no longer a corner? If you are in a pocket, at what point do you pass when you are no longer in the pocket? Language tries to cope with these questions, and often, poorly. ... When I was a young boy, I would ask friends one of my favorite riddles, "What is the difference of an orange?" When my question was met only with puzzled, distorted faces, even irritated silence, I would happily answer "the peel!" What interests me most in my work is the "peelness" of it...

== Awards and grants ==
Awards include Louis Comfort Tiffany Foundation Grant, 1987; John S. Guggenheim Memorial Foundation Fellowship; Henry Moore Sculpture Trust, 1989; Flintridge Foundation Visual Artists Award, 1999/2000; and the St. Gaudens Memorial Fellowship, 2000. Shelton is part of collections such as Museum of Modern Art, New York; Smithsonian American Art Museum, Washington, D.C.; Getty Museum, Los Angeles; Los Angeles County Museum of Art; the Museum of Contemporary Art, Los Angeles; Walker Art Center, Minneapolis; the Museum of Fine Arts, Houston; Panza Foundation, Milan, Italy; and Museum of Modern Art, Lodz, Poland. Public commissions include ‘’sixbeastsandtwomonkeys’’ for the Police Administration Building in downtown Los Angeles, 2008-2009, ‘’thinmanlittlebird’’ for the Indianapolis-Marion County Public Library, 2008-2009, and ‘’cloudsandclunkers’’ at the Seattle-Tacoma International Airport (Concours A), Seattle, WA, 2003.

Saint-Gaudens Memorial Fellowship, 2000
Flintridge Foundation Visual Artists Award, 1999-2000
Individual Artist Fellowship Grant, National Endowment for the Arts, 1994, 1984, 1982, 1980
John Simon Guggenheim Memorial Foundation Fellowship, 1989
Louis Comfort Tiffany Foundation Grant, 1987
Young Talent Award, Los Angeles County Museum of Art, 1985

== Solo exhibitions and major projects ==
Peter Shelton has exhibited internationally in museums and galleries in over fifty-five solo exhibitions and over one hundred and twenty group shows, including:

- powerhousefrenchtablenecklaces, 2012. Sperone Westwater, New York, NY.
- eyehand: Selected Sculpture from 1975–2011, 2011. L.A. Louver, Venice, CA.

-Between 1984 and 2011, Shelton was presented in twenty-four solo and over forty-five total exhibitions at L.A. Louver, Venice, California, and Louver Gallery New York, NY.

- redpocket, blackslot, uheader, and drawings, 2011. Portland Art Museum, Portland, OR.
- blackelephanthouse, 1998. Henry Moore Sculpture Trust, Halifax, England (1998–99).
- "sixtyslippers, 1997. L.A. Louver, Venice, CA (1997). University of California Berkeley, Berkeley, CA (1998). Madison Arts Center, Madison, WI (1999). Contemporary Arts Museum, Houston, TX (1999).
- godspipes, 1989-98. Irish Museum of Modern Art, Dublin, Ireland (1998). L.A. Louver, Venice, CA (2006). Herron Galleries, Herron School of Art and Design, Indianapolis, IN (2008).
- bottlesbonesandthingsgetwet, 1994. Los Angeles County Museum of Art, Los Angeles, CA.
- Peter Shelton: Drawings and Sculptures, 1990-92. L.A. Louver, Venice, CA (1990). Arts Club of Chicago, Chicago, IL (1992).
- thingsgetwet, 1989-2012. Louver Gallery New York, NY (1993). Los Angeles County Museum of Art, Los Angeles, CA (1994). Museum of Contemporary Art, San Diego, CA (1997). Sperone Westwater, New York, NY (2012).
- waxworks, 1989-99. Des Moines Art Center, Des Moines, IA (1988). Museum of Contemporary Art, San Diego, CA (1989). San Jose Museum of Art, San Jose, CA (1989).
- BLACKVAULTfalloffstone, 1988, The Walker Art Center, Minneapolis, MN.
- STRETCHspread, 1987. Lannan Museum, Lake Worth, FL (1988). Henry Art Gallery, University of Washington, Seattle, WA (2001).
- TUBtubesandpipes, 1987. Whitney Museum of American Art, New York, NY (1987). Irvine Fine Arts Gallery, University of California, Irvine, CA (1989).
- HARDSTRETCHdroop, 1987. Whitney Museum of American Art, New York, NY.
- floatinghouseDEADMAN, 1985-86. University of Massachusetts, Amherst, MA (1986). Wight Gallery, University of California, Los Angeles, CA (1987). Herron Galleries, Herron School of Art, Indianapolis, IN (1989). Louver Gallery New York, NY (1990).
- pipegutwaterseatandSTANDSTILL, 1983-84. Portland Center for the Visual Arts, Portland, OR (1984).
- MAJORJOINTShangersandsquat, 1983. Center of Contemporary Art, Seattle, WA (1983). L.A. Louver and Malinda Wyatt Galleries, Los Angeles, CA (1984).
- whiteroundHEAD, 1982. Artists Space, New York, NY.
- trunknutsWHITEHEADfloater, 1981-82. Open Space Gallery, Victoria, British Columbia, Canada (1982).
- NECKWALLfootscreensleeper, 1981. Malinda Wyatt Gallery, Los Angeles, CA.
- BROWNROOMS, 1977-78. Los Angeles Contemporary Exhibitions, Los Angeles, CA (1980).
- BIRDHOUSEholecan, 1980. Chapman College, Orange, CA, in conjunction with the L.A. Institute of Contemporary Art, Los Angeles, CA.
- HEADROOMfootspace, 1980. Artpark, Lewiston, NY.
- SWEATHOUSEandlittleprincipals, 1977-81. Wight Gallery, University of California, Los Angeles, CA (1979). Contemporary Arts Forum in Santa Barbara, CA (1982).

== Major permanent commissions ==
- sixbeastsandtwomonkeys (2009), Los Angeles, California (2008–09)
- thinmanlittlebird (2008-2009), Indianapolis County Public Library, Indianapolis, Indiana
- cloudsandclunkers (2003-2006), Seattle-Tacoma International Airport, Seattle, Washington
- ROCKshadow(2002), Seattle, Washington

== Selected bibliography ==
- Ollman, Leah. "Peter Shelton." Art in America. Mar. 2012: 173, illus.
- Melrod, George. “Interview: Peter Shelton.” art ltd. May/June 2012: 50-54, illus.
- Doktorczyk-Donohue, Marlena. “Simple Simply Isn’t, a Conversation with Peter Shelton.” Sculpture. April 2012 Vol. 31: 38-45, illus.
- McGrew, Rebecca; Phillips, Glenn, eds. (August 31, 2011). It Happened at Pomona: Art at the Edge of Los Angeles 1969-1973. Claremont: Pomona College Museum of Art. pp. 292–97. ISBN 978-0-9818955-8-1.
- Burlingham, Cynthia. Outside the Box, Edition Jacob Samuel, 1988-2010. Los Angeles: Hammer Museum and Los Angeles Museum of Art, 2010. illus.
- Firmin, Sandra Q. Artpark 1974-1984. Princeton: Princeton Architectural Press and State University of New York, University at Buffalo Art Galleries, 2010. 134, illus.
- Betinski, Elizabeta, Lyn Kienholz, and Corinne Nelson. L.A. Rising Art and Artists Before 1980. Los Angeles: California International Art Foundation, 2010. 415, illus.
- Franciolli, Marco, and Manuela Kahn-Rossi. Donate Panza di Biumo. Lugano: Museo Cantonale d’Arte, 2010. 61-62, illus.
- Westwater, Angela. HUNTERS & GATHERERS. Sent: Gian Enzo Sperone Gallery, 2010. 8, illus.
- Thomas, Elizabeth. Matrix/Berkeley: A Changing Exhibition of Contemporary Art. Berkeley: University of California, Berkeley Art Museum and Pacific Film Archive, 2009. 372-73, illus.
- Zelevansky, Lynn. The Broad Contemporary Art Museum at the Los Angeles County Museum of Art. (BCAM/LACMA/2008) Los Angeles: Los Angeles County Museum of Art, 2008. 181-82, illus.
- Momin, Shamim M., and Adam D. Weinberg. Whitney Museum of American Art at Altria 25 Years. New York: Whitney Museum of American Art, 2008. 25, illus.
- Bostrom, Antonia, ed. The Fran and Ray Stark Collection of 20th Century Sculpture at the J. Paul Getty Museum. Los Angeles: J. Paul Getty Museum, 2008. xi, 1, 11, 151-153, illus.
- Hoppe, David. “Public Icons, Peter Shelton’s library sculptures cast Indy in a new light.” NUVO [Indianapolis, IN] 29 Apr. 2009: cover, 10-12, 17, illus.
- Collins, Judith. Sculpture Today. London: Phaidon Press, 2007. 373-74, illus.
- Fox, Howard N, and Catherine Grenier. Los Angeles 1955-1985: Birth of an Art Capital. Paris: Centre Pompidou, 2006. 46, 302, 317, 328, 354, illus.
- Rochette, Anne, and Wade Saunders. “Place Matters: Los Angeles Sculpture Today.” Art in America. Nov. 2006: 180-81, illus.
- Rose, Barbara. Monocromos de malevich al presente, Museo Centro de Arte Reina Sofia. Madrid, 2004. 19, 94, 95, illus.
- Belli, Gabriella. Le Stanze dell’Arte, Figure e Immagini del XX Secolo. Trento: Museo di Arte Moderna e Contemporanea di Trento e Roverto, 2002. 7, illus.
- Panza di Biumo, Giuseppe. The Panza Collection. Varese: Villa Menafoglio Litta Panza, 2002. 222, illus.
- Minola, Anna, Maria Cristina Mundici, Francesco Poli, and Maria Teresa Roberto. Gian Enzo Sperone: Torino Roma New York. Torino: hopefulmonster editore, 2000. 421, illus.
- Baker, Kenneth. “End of the Century Art: Production in Los Angeles.” Panza: The Legacy of a Collector. Los Angeles: Museum of Contemporary Art, 1999. 130-139, illus.
- Brooks, Rosetta. “Peter Shelton.” Artforum. Mar 1998: 105-106, illus.
- Neuman, David. Spatiotemporal Mars 10. Stockholm: Magasin 3 Stockholm Konsthall, 1998.
- Baas, Jacquelynn. sixtyslippers. Berkeley: Berkeley Art Museum, University of California, 1998. illus.
- Knight, Christopher. “bodyknowledge.” godspipes blackelephanthouse. Dublin and Leeds: Irish Museum of Modern Art and Henry Moore Sculpture Institute, 1998. illus.
- Biggs, Lewis and Robert Hopper. leaving tracks: arttranspennine ‘98. Liverpool and Leeds: Tate Gallery Liverpool and Henry Moore Sculpture Institute, 1998. 182-185, illus.
- Panza di Biumo, Giuseppe. “La Exposicio a Sa Llonja.” Colleccio Panza di Biumo: Anys 80 i 90. La Laja: Govern Balear, Conselleria d’Educacio, Cultura i Esports, 1997. 9, 20, 22, 102-107, 150-151, illus.
- Smith, Edward Lucie. Art Today. London: Phaidon Press, 1995. 60, illus.
- Eliel, Carol. bottlesbonesandthingsgetwet. Los Angeles: Los Angeles County Museum of Art, 1994. illus.
- Kienholz, Edward. Peter Shelton. Hope: Faith and Charity in Hope Gallery, 1992. illus.
- Eliel, Carol S. PETERSHELTONasculptor’sDRAWINGS. Chicago: The Arts Club of Chicago, 1992. illus.
- O’Douherty, Brian. Twenty-Seven Installations: Portland Center for the Visual Arts. Portland: Oregon Art Institute, 1989. illus.
- Princenthal, Nancy. “The Body in Question.” Sculpture. Sept./Oct. 1989: 24 - 29, illus.
- Friedman, Martin. Sculpture, Inside and Outside. Minneapolis: Rizzoli, Walker Art Center, 1988. 7, 12, 16, 17, 216-231, illus.
- Butler, Cornelia. Peter Shelton - Waxworks. Des Moines: Des Moines Art Center, 1988. illus.
- Clearwater, Bonnie. Abstract Expressions in Recent Sculpture. Lake Worth: Lannan Museum, 1987. illus.
- Monaghan, Kathleen. Elements: Five Installations. New York: Whitney Museum of American Art, 1987. illus.
- Fox, Howard. Avant-Garde in the Eighties. Los Angeles: Los Angeles County Museum of Art, 1987. 97,98, illus.
- Tonelli, Dr. Edith A. floatinghouseDEADMAN. Los Angeles: University of California, Wight Art Gallery, 1987. illus.
- Pietrantonio, Giancito Di. “I Luoghi Mobili Dell Indefinito: Neoinformale, Postastrazione E Neominimalismo.” Anniottanta. Milano: Mazzotta, 1985. 123, 152, 161, illus.
- Caroli, Flavio. “Pittura Veloce, Post-Astrazione E Post- Naturalismo,” Catalogo Generale 1984, La Biennale di Venezia. Venice: Edizioni la Biennale, 1984. 201, 213, illus.
- Knight, Christopher. Peter Shelton Sculpture. British Columbia: Open Space Gallery, 1982. illus.
