= Pride of Carthage =

2005 novel by David Anthony Durham

- Cover of first edition (hardcover)
- Author: David Anthony Durham
- Language: English
- Genre: Historical fiction novel
- Publisher: Doubleday
- Publication date: 2005
- Publication place: United States
- Media type: Print (Hardback and paperback)
- Pages: 592 pp
- ISBN: 0-385-72249-4
- OCLC: 63040992

Pride of Carthage is a 2005 novel about the Second Punic War by American author David Anthony Durham. It was first published by Doubleday, in the United States, 2005. The book was translated into Italian, Polish, Portuguese, Romanian, Russian, Spanish, and Swedish.

== Plot summary ==
The novel is a retelling of the assault on the Roman Republic by the Carthaginian general Hannibal. It begins in Ancient Spain, where Hannibal sets out with tens of thousands of soldiers and 30 elephants. After conquering the Roman-allied city of Saguntum, Hannibal accepts Rome's declaration of war. He befriends peoples disillusioned by Rome and outwits the opponents who believe the land route he has chosen is impossible. Hannibal's troops suffer brutal losses as they pass through the Pyrenees Mountains, ford the Rhone River, and make a winter crossing of the Alps, before descending to fight battles at the Trebia River, Lake Trasimene, Cannae and Zama. The novel ends roughly where the war ends, although Hannibal lived on for some years as both a political figure and a mercenary soldier.

The novel features a wide cast of characters of many nationalities, from famous generals down to infantrymen and camp followers, from Numidians to Macedonians. Durham draws a complex portrait of Hannibal, both as a warrior and as a husband and father.

== Awards and nominations ==
- Finalist for the 2006 Legacy Award for Fiction from the Hurston/Wright Foundation.
- Book Sense 76 pick
- Black Issues Book Review’s Best Books of 2005
- Book Sense Extended Bestseller List
- For reviews see: Black Issues Book Review (January–February 2005), The Christian Science Monitor (January 11, 2005), The New York Times Book Review (February 6, 2005), The San Francisco Chronicle (February 13, 2005), “All Things Considered” on National Public Radio (February 15, 2005), The News and Observer (February 20, 2005), The Washington Post (March 30, 2005).

== Further reading (non-fiction) ==
- Bradford, E, Hannibal, London, Macmillan London Ltd., 1981
- Caven, B., Punic Wars, London, George Werdenfeld and Nicholson Ltd., 1980
- Cottrell, Leonard, Hannibal: Enemy of Rome, Da Capo Press, 1992, ISBN 0-306-80498-0
- Daly, Gregory, Cannae: The Experience of Battle in the Second Punic War, London/New York, Routledge, 2002, ISBN 0-415-32743-1
- Delbrück, Hans, Warfare in Antiquity, 1920, ISBN 0-8032-9199-X
- Hoyos, Dexter: Hannibal's Dynasty: Power and Politics in the Western Mediterranean, 247–183 B.C. (Routledge: London & New York, 2003; paperback edition with maps, 2005) - has much discussion of strategy and warfare.
- Hoyos, Dexter, Hannibal: Rome's Greatest Enemy, Bristol Phoenix Press, 2005, ISBN 1-904675-46-8 (hbk) ISBN 1-904675-47-6 (pbk)
- Lamb, Harold, Hannibal: One Man Against Rome, 1959.
- Lancel, Serge, Hannibal, Blackwell Publishing, 1999, ISBN 0-631-21848-3
- Livy, and De Selincourt, Aubery, The War with Hannibal: Books XXI-XXX of the History of Rome from its Foundation, Penguin Classics, Reprint edition, July 30, 1965, ISBN 0-14-044145-X (pbk)(also )
- Prevas, John, Hannibal Crosses the Alps: The Invasion of Italy and the Second Punic War, 2001, ISBN 0-306-81070-0, questions which route he took
- Talbert, Richard J.A., ed., Atlas of Classical History, Routledge, London/New York, 1985, ISBN 0-415-03463-9
