= Marita Golden =

American writer (born 1950)

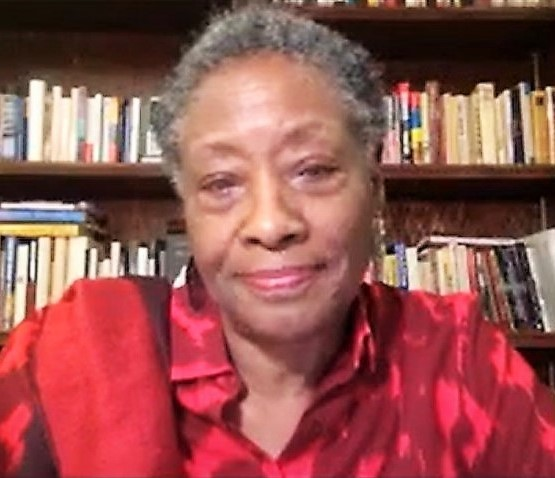
- Golden in 2020
- Born: April 28, 1950 (age 76); Washington, D.C., U.S.
- Education: American University (BA); Columbia University (MSc)
- Known for: Co-founder of the Hurston/Wright Foundation
- Writing career
- Years active: 1983–present
- Notable awards: 2002 Authors Guild Award for Distinguished Service to the Literary Community, 2001 Barnes & Noble Writers for Writers Award presented by Poets and Writers; Woman of the Year Award from Zeta Phi Beta
- Website: maritagolden.com

Marita Golden (born April 28, 1950) is an American novelist, nonfiction writer, professor, and co-founder of the Hurston/Wright Foundation, a national organization that serves as a resource center for African-American writers.

== Background and career ==
Marita Golden was born in Washington, D.C., in 1950 and attended the city's public schools. She received a B.A. degree in American Studies and English from American University and a M.SC. in Journalism from Columbia University.

After graduating from Columbia, she worked in publishing and began a career as a freelance writer. She has written articles and essays for many magazines and newspapers, including Essence Magazine, The New York Times, The Washington Post, and The Root.

Golden's first book, Migrations of the Heart (1983), was a memoir based on her experiences coming of age during the 1960s and her political activism as well as her marriage to a Nigerian and her life in Nigeria, where she lived for four years.

Among her subsequent books are the novels A Woman's Place (1986), Long Distance Life (1989), And Do Remember Me (1992), and The Edge of Heaven (1999), as well as non-fiction titles such as Migrations of the Heart (1983), Saving Our Sons: Raising Black Children in a Turbulent World (1994), and A Miracle Everyday: Triumph and Transformation in the Lives of Single Mothers (1999). She was included in the collections Breaking Ice: An Anthology of Contemporary African American Fiction (1990), edited by Terry McMillan, and Daughters of Africa: An International Anthology of Words and Writings by Women of African Descent (1992), edited by Margaret Busby.

Golden has taught at many colleges and universities, including the University of Lagos in Lagos, Nigeria, Roxbury Community College, Emerson College, American University, George Mason University, and Virginia Commonwealth University. She holds the position of Writer in Residence at the University of the District of Columbia, in Washington, D.C. She has held previous Writer-in-Residence positions at Brandeis University, University of the District of Columbia, Hampton University, Simmons College, Columbia College, William and Mary, Old Dominion University and Howard University.

As a literary activist, she co-founded the Washington, D.C.–based African-American Writers Guild, as well as the Hurston/Wright Foundation, named in honor of Zora Neale Hurston and Richard Wright, which serves the national and international community of Black writers and administers the Hurston/Wright Legacy Award.

== Works ==
=== Novels ===
- A Woman's Place (1986)
- Long Distance Life (1989)
- And Do Remember Me (1992)
- The Edge of Heaven (1999)
- After (2006)
- The Wide Circumference of Love (2017)

=== Nonfiction ===
- Migrations of the Heart (1983)
- Saving Our Sons Raising Black Children in a Turbulent World (1994)
- A Miracle Everyday: Triumph and Transformation in the Lives of Single Mothers (1999)
- Don't Play in the Sun – One Woman's Journey Through The Color Complex. Knopf Doubleday Publishing Group. 2004. ISBN 9780307425607.
- The Strong Black Woman: How a Myth Endangers the Physical and Mental Health of Black Women. 2021. ISBN 978-1642506839

=== Anthologies ===
- Wild Women Don't Wear No Blues: Black Women Writers on Love, Men and Sex (1993)
- Skin Deep: Black and White Women on Race. Knopf Doubleday Publishing Group (1994). 2011. ISBN 9780307794789.
- Gumbo: A Celebration of African American Writing (2002)
- It's All Love: Black Writers on Soul Mates Family and Friends (2009)

== Awards ==
- 2001: Barnes & Noble Writers for Writers Award presented by Poets & Writers
- 2002: Distinguished Service Award from the Authors Guild
- 2007: Award for Fiction from the Black Caucus of the American Library Association (for her novel After)
- 2008: Maryland Author Award from the Association of Maryland Librarians
- 2018: NAACP Image Award nominee for Outstanding Literary Work – Fiction (her second nomination)
- Inducted into the International Literary Hall of Fame of Writers of African Descent at the Gwendolyn Brooks Center at Chicago State University
- Honorary Doctorate from the University of Richmond
- Woman of the Year Award from Zeta Phi Beta
- Distinguished Alumni Award from American University
