= Hurston/Wright Foundation =

U.S. literary nonprofit organization

- Founded: 1990; 36 years ago
- Founder: Marita Golden and Clyde McElvene
- Type: Nonprofit, private foundation
- Tax ID no.: 52-1706969
- Purpose: "to discover, mentor, and honor black writers."
- Location: Washington, D.C., United States
- Region served: Worldwide
- Key people: Cyndee Landrum (board chair)
- Website: hurstonwright.org

The Zora Neale Hurston/Richard Wright Foundation is an American literary nonprofit organization that supports the development and careers of black writers. The Foundation provides classes, workshops, an annual conference, and offers the Hurston/Wright Legacy Award and the North Star Award, among others. Writer Marita Golden and cultural historian Clyde McElvene founded the organization in 1990.

== History ==
The Hurston/Wright Foundation was founded in Washington, D.C., in 1990 by writer Marita Golden and cultural historian Clyde McElvene. Golden used $750 of her own money to found the organization, which she wanted in part "to address the dearth of black graduate students in literature that she found while teaching at several area universities". The stated mission is to help develop the careers of black writers and to increase the representation within the literary field. The organization is named after prolific black writers Zora Neale Hurston and Richard Wright. Toni Morrison previously sat on the advisory board. The executive director is Nichelle M. Hayes.

== Activities ==
The Foundation provides classes, workshops, public readings, and awards. Previous writing workshop participants include Imani Perry and Jericho Brown. It also holds an annual literary conference in D.C., which was virtual in 2020 and 2021 due to COVID-19. The Legacy Awards are announced annually at a ceremony.

== Awards ==
=== Hurston/Wright Legacy Awards ===
The Legacy Awards were created in 2001 to recognize outstanding black writers in the United States and across the diaspora. The awards are offered in four categories: fiction, debut fiction, nonfiction, and poetry. The 2020 winners were Jeffrey Colvin, Curdella Forbes, Ladan Osman, and Albert Woodfox.

=== College Awards ===
The College Awards recognize excellence in fiction and poetry written by undergraduate students. Past winners include Briit Bennett, Natalie Baszile, Brit Bennett, David Anthony Durham, and Joy Priest.

=== Crossover Award ===
The Crossover Award was created in 2020 in partnership with The Undefeated, to recognize emerging literary nonfiction writers. The inaugural winner was Melanie Farmer for the essay "Rolling: A Ladies’ Guide to Brazilian jiu-jitsu".

=== North Star Award ===
The Award is named in reference of the importance of the North Star for African Americans, and is given for lifetime literary achievement. Recipients of the North Star Award include Chinua Achebe (2002), Sonia Sanchez (2007), Alice Walker (2012), Edwidge Danticat (2015), and Ernest J. Gaines (2019).

=== Ella Baker Award ===
The Ella Baker Award is given to writers for work that supports social justice. Wil Haygood, whose reporting inspired the film The Butler, received the award in 2014.

Madam C.J. Walker Award

Introduced in 2005, the Madam C.J. Walker Award is given to people, organizations, or businesses that have shown exceptional innovation in supporting and sustaining black literature. The Calabash International Literary Festival received the Madam C.J. Walker Award in 2021.
