= Indianapolis Public Library Branch No. 6 =

Historic library building in Indianapolis, Indiana, US

- U.S. National Register of Historic Places
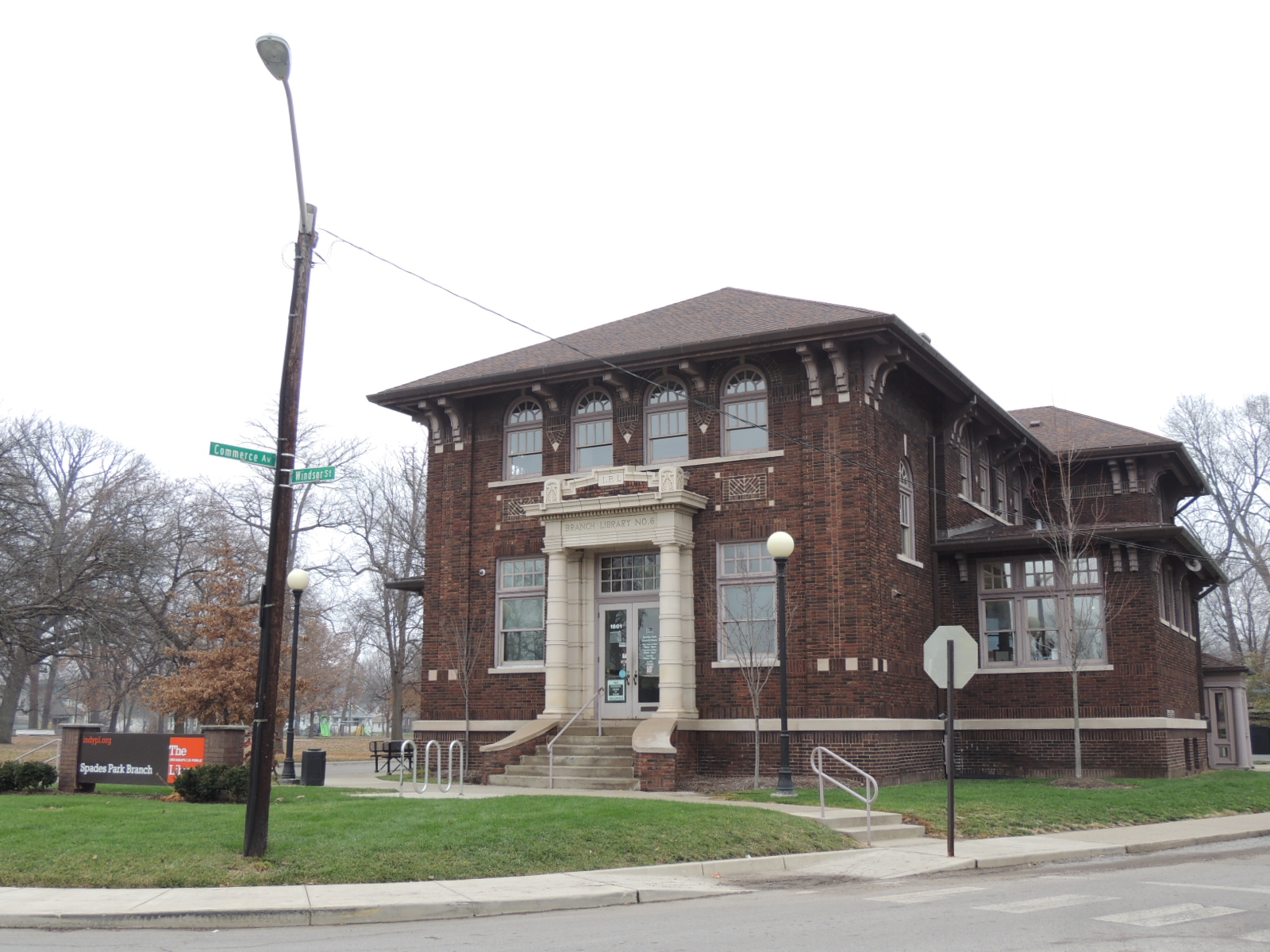
- Spades Park Branch, December 2015

- Location within Indiana Location within the United States
- Location: 1801 Nowland Ave., Indianapolis, Indiana, U.S.
- Coordinates: 39°47′06″N 86°07′45″W
- Area: Less than 1 acre (0.40 ha)
- Built: 1911-1912
- Architects: Parker, Wilson B.
- Architectural style: Renaissance Revival, Craftsman, Arts and Crafts
- NRHP reference No.: 16000078
- Added to NRHP: March 15, 2016

Indianapolis Public Library Branch No. 6, also known as Spades Park Library (Carnegie), is a historic Carnegie library located in Indianapolis, Indiana, United States. It was built in 1911–1912, and is a two-story, L-shaped, Italian Renaissance style masonry building on a raised basement. It has a terra cotta tile hipped roof, decorative brickwork, limestone accents, and elements of American Craftsman and Arts and Crafts style decorative elements. It was one of five libraries constructed from the $120,000 the Carnegie Foundation gave the City of Indianapolis in 1909 to be used towards the construction of six branch libraries. The library remains in operation as the Spades Park Branch of the Indianapolis Public Library.

The Spades Library underwent an extensive restoration in 1987. It was listed on the National Register of Historic Places in 2016.

== See also ==
- List of Carnegie libraries in Indiana
- National Register of Historic Places listings in Center Township, Marion County, Indiana
