= Hawthorne Branch Library No. 2 =

- U.S. National Register of Historic Places
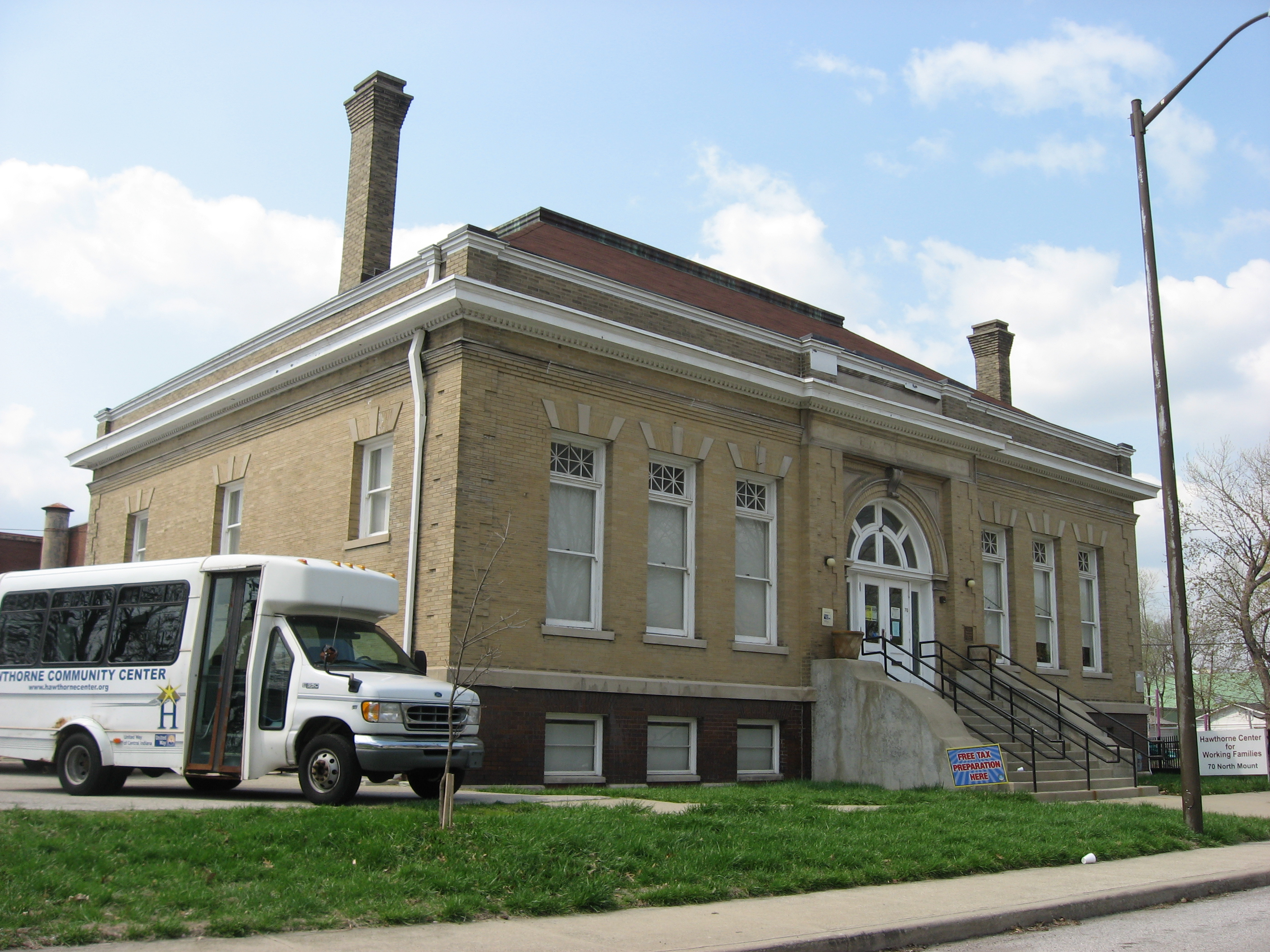
- Hawthorne Branch Library No. 2, April 2011

- Location within Indianapolis Location within Indiana Location within the United States
- Location: 70 N. Mount St., Indianapolis, Indiana
- Coordinates: 39°46′3″N 86°12′6″W
- Area: 1.9 acres (0.77 ha)
- Built: 1909-1911
- Architect: Bohlen & Son
- Architectural style: Classical Revival
- NRHP reference No.: 00000499
- Added to NRHP: May 18, 2000

Hawthorne Branch Library No. 2, also known as Hawthorne Education Annex, is a historic Carnegie library building located in Indianapolis, Indiana. Built in 1909–1911, with funds provided by the Carnegie Foundation, it is a one-story, rectangular, Classical Revival style brick and limestone building on a raised basement. It has a truncated hipped roof and features a slightly projecting pavilion housing a round arch. It was renovated in 1955, after its closure as a library, and again in 1999.

The building was added to the National Register of Historic Places in 2000. The building no longer contains a public library. Since 2000, it houses the offices of the Hawthorne Social Services Association, a local non-profit.

== See also ==
- List of Carnegie libraries in Indiana
- National Register of Historic Places listings in Marion County, Indiana
