= The Fire This Time =

The Fire This Time may refer to:

- "The Fire This Time" (Law & Order), an episode of Law & Order
- The Fire This Time (book), an essay and poetry anthology
- The Fire This Time: U.S. War Crimes in the Gulf, a non-fiction book by Ramsey Clark
- "The Fire This Time", a song by Marisa Anderson from Still, Here
- The Fire This Time (album), a 1992 album by Lester Bowie's Brass Fantasy
- The Fire This Time, a 1994 album by Cyril Neville and the Uptown Allstars
- The Fire This Time (audio documentary), a 2002 audio documentary with accompaniment by various IDM and ambient artists
- America 1968: The Fire This Time, a work of reportage by Max Hastings

== See also ==
- The Fire Next Time, a 1963 non-fiction book by James Baldwin
