= Turning (novel) =

2022 young adult novel by Joy L. Smith

- First edition cover
- Author: Joy L. Smith
- Publisher: Denene Millner Books
- Publication date: March 1, 2022
- Pages: 352
- ISBN: 978-1-5344-9582-1

Turning is a young adult novel by Joy L. Smith, published in 2022 by Denene Millner Books, an imprint of Simon & Schuster. The novel centers around Genie, a talented ballerina whose career is ended after a paraplegia-causing accident.

== Summary ==
Turning follows Genie, a promising Black ballerina, following a career-ending fall from a rooftop caused her to become paraplegic. Now, instead of focusing on her career, Genie now attends physical therapy regularly, deals with accessibility issues, and manages interpersonal relationships, such as those with her toxic ex-boyfriend and her overbearing mother. As the novel progresses, Genie meets Kyle, a former gymnast with a traumatic brain injury, in physical therapy, and she begins considering a new future in choreography.

== Characters ==
- Genie: the protagonist
- Genie's mom: a recovering alcoholic who had Genie when she was a teenager
- Genie's father: estranged and abusive
- Hannah: Genie's former best friend, along with Maya, and a Latinx ballerina
- Maya: Genie's former best friend, along with Hannah
- Nolan: Genie's Black, toxic ex-boyfriend
- Kyle: a brown-skinned former gymnast with a traumatic brain injury Genie meets in physical therapy

== Themes ==
Turning explores themes related to "family, identity, and discrimination in ballet".

== Reception ==
School Library Journal's Mindy Rhigor called Turning "a compelling and emotional story" that "deftly handles complex topics such as accessibility, race, abortion, domestic violence, and sobriety/recovery". Kirkus Reviews added that the novel "provides "a nuanced portrayal of disability, dance, and starting over".

Publishers Weekly highlighted how "Smith depicts via an unbridled first-person narration [Genie's] growing proficiency adjusting to her emotional and physical needs, her deep-rooted love of dance, and her recurring disbelief at how swiftly her life changed, while suspensefully revealing the nature of Nolan's role in Genie's fall".

Multiple reviewers discussed Genie's character, with Kirkus noting that her "voice realistically alternates between snarky and vulnerable". Similarly, Rhiger found that Genie's "grief" and "anger ... are raw and real". However, Publishers Weekly indicated that "Genie can come across as one-note".

Booklist also reviewed the novel.
