= Jesmyn Ward =

American writer (born 1977)

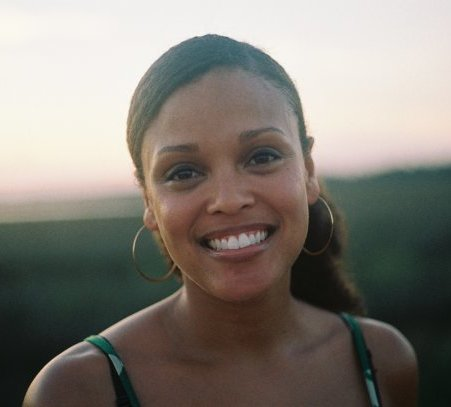
- Ward in 2011
- Born: April 1, 1977 (age 49); Berkeley, California, U.S.
- Education: Stanford University (BA, MA); University of Michigan (MFA)
- Occupations: Writer, professor
- Writing career
- Language: English
- Genres: Fiction, memoir
- Notable works: Salvage the Bones; The Fire This Time (ed.); Sing, Unburied, Sing
- Notable awards: National Book Award for Fiction (2011, 2017); MacArthur "Genius" Fellowship (2017)
- Website: jesmimi.blogspot.com

Jesmyn Ward (born April 1, 1977) is an American novelist and a professor of English at Tulane University, where she holds the Andrew W. Mellon Professorship in the Humanities. She won the 2011 National Book Award for Fiction for her second novel Salvage the Bones, a story about familial love and community in facing Hurricane Katrina. She won the 2017 National Book Award for Fiction for her novel Sing, Unburied, Sing.

She is the only woman and only African American to win the National Book Award for Fiction twice. All of Ward's first three novels are set in the fictitious Mississippi town of Bois Sauvage. In her fourth novel, Let Us Descend, the main character Annis perhaps inhabits an earlier Bois Sauvage when she is taken shackled from the Carolina coast and put to work on a Mississippi sugar plantation near New Orleans.

== Early life and education ==
Jesmyn Ward was born in 1977 in Berkeley, California. When she was three, her parents returned to DeLisle, Mississippi, where they were originally from. She reportedly developed a love-hate relationship with her hometown after having been bullied by classmates both at public school and while attending a private school paid for by her mother's employer.

The first in her family to attend college, Ward earned a Bachelor of Arts in English in 1999, and a Master of Arts in media studies and communication in 2000, both at Stanford University. Ward chose to become a writer to honor the memory of her younger brother, who was killed by a drunk driver in October 2000, just after Ward had completed her master's degree. The driver responsible was not charged for her brother's death, only for leaving the scene of the car accident.

In 2005, Ward earned a Master of Fine Arts in Creative Writing from the University of Michigan. Shortly afterwards, she and her family were impacted by Hurricane Katrina. With their house in DeLisle flooding rapidly, the Ward family set out in their car to get to a local church, but ended up stranded in a field full of tractors. When the owners of the land eventually checked on their possessions, they refused to invite the Wards into their home, claiming they were overcrowded. The family was eventually given shelter by another family down the road.

Ward went on to work at the University of New Orleans, where her daily commute took her through the neighborhoods ravaged by the hurricane. Empathizing with the struggle of the survivors and coming to terms with her own experience during the storm, Ward was unable to write creatively for three years – the time it took her to find a publisher for her first novel, Where the Line Bleeds.

== Career ==
In 2008, just as Ward had decided to give up writing and enroll in a nursing program, Where the Line Bleeds was accepted by Agate Publishing. The novel was picked as a book club selection by Essence magazine and received a Black Caucus of the American Library Association (BCALA) Honor Award in 2009. It was shortlisted for the VCU Cabell First Novelist Award and the Hurston/Wright Legacy Award. Starting on the day twin protagonists Joshua and Christophe DeLisle graduate from high school, Where the Line Bleeds follows the brothers as their choices pull them in opposite directions. Unwilling to leave the small rural town on the Mississippi Coast where they were raised by their loving grandmother, the twins struggle to find work, with Joshua eventually becoming a dock hand and Christophe joining his drug-dealing cousin. In a starred review, Publishers Weekly called Ward "a fresh new voice in American literature" who "unflinchingly describes a world full of despair but not devoid of hope."

From 2008 to 2010, Ward had a Stegner Fellowship at Stanford University. She was the John and Renée Grisham Writer in Residence at the University of Mississippi for the 2010–2011 academic year.

In her second novel, Salvage the Bones, Ward homed in once more on the visceral bond between poor black siblings growing up on the Mississippi Coast. Chronicling the lives of pregnant teenager Esch Batiste, her three brothers, and their father during the 10 days leading up to Hurricane Katrina, the day of the storm, and the day after, Ward uses vibrant language steeped in metaphors to illuminate the fundamental aspects of love, friendship, passion, and tenderness. Explaining her main character's fascination with the Greek mythological figure of Medea, Ward told Elizabeth Hoover of The Paris Review: "It infuriates me that the work of white American writers can be universal and lay claim to classic texts, while black and female authors are ghetto-ized as 'other'. I wanted to align Esch with that classic text, with the universal figure of Medea, the antihero, to claim that tradition as part of my Western literary heritage. The stories I write are particular to my community and my people, which means the details are particular to our circumstances, but the larger story of the survivor, the savage, is essentially a universal, human one."

On November 16, 2011, Ward won the National Book Award for Fiction for Salvage the Bones. Interviewed by CNN's Ed Lavandera on November 16, 2011, she said that both her nomination and her victory had come as a surprise, given that the novel had been largely ignored by mainstream reviewers. "When I hear people talking about the fact that they think we live in a post-racial America, ... it blows my mind, because I don't know that place. I've never lived there. ... If one day, ... they're able to pick up my work and read it and see ... the characters in my books as human beings and feel for them, then I think that that is a political act", Ward stated in a television interview with Anna Bressanin of BBC News on December 22, 2011.

Ward received an Alex Award for Salvage the Bones on January 23, 2012. The Alex Awards are given out each year by the Young Adult Library Services Association to ten books written for adults that resonate strongly with young people aged 12–18. Commenting on the winning books in School Library Journal, former Alex Award committee chair Angela Carstensen described Salvage the Bones as a novel with "a small but intense following – each reader has passed the book to a friend."

From 2011 to 2014, Ward was an assistant professor of creative writing at the University of South Alabama. Ward joined the faculty at Tulane in the fall of 2014.

In July 2011, Ward wrote that she had finished the first draft of her third book, calling it the hardest thing she had ever written. It was a memoir titled Men We Reaped and was published in 2013. The book explores the lives of her brother and four other young black men who lost their lives in her hometown.

In August 2016, Simon & Schuster released The Fire This Time: A New Generation Speaks About Race, edited by Ward. The book takes as its starting point James Baldwin's The Fire Next Time, his classic 1963 examination of race in America. Contributors to The Fire This Time include Carol Anderson, Jericho Brown, Garnett Cadogan, Edwidge Danticat, Rachel Kaadzi Ghansah, Mitchell S. Jackson, Honorée Fanonne Jeffers, Kima Jones, Kiese Laymon, Daniel José Older, Emily Raboteau, Claudia Rankine, Clint Smith, Natasha Trethewey, Wendy S. Walters, Isabel Wilkerson, Kevin Young, and Jesmyn Ward herself.

In 2017, she was the recipient of a MacArthur "genius grant" from the John D. and Catherine T. MacArthur Foundation.

Her third novel, Sing, Unburied, Sing, was released in 2017

Set in Ward's fictitious Mississippi town, Bois Sauvage, the novel is narrated from three perspectives mainly within a rural family. Jojo, a young African-American boy, navigates a maturation from childhood to adulthood. His mother, Leonie, struggles with addiction and the challenges of raising children. Finally, Richie, a wayward ghost from the Mississippi State Penitentiary, haunts Jojo and pleads with his family to help him find closure.

The novel won the 2017 National Book Award for fiction.

Ward thus became the first woman and first Black American to win two National Book Awards for Fiction. The novel also won an Anisfield-Wolf Book Award.

In 2018, Ward contributed her Prologue from Men We Reaped to a special edition of Xavier Review (Vol.38. No.2), which includes a foreword by Thomas Bonner Jr. an afterword by Robin G. Vander (both editors of the volume), a chronology, and fifteen essays by scholars, including Trudier Harris and Keith Cartwright. At the time this was the first book-length publication on Ward.

Ward is a contributor to the 2019 anthology New Daughters of Africa, edited by Margaret Busby.

In 2020, Simon & Schuster published Ward's Navigate Your Stars, adapted from a speech the author made at Tulane's 2018 commencement.

Ward's personal essay, "On Witness and Respair: A Personal Tragedy Followed by Pandemic", about the death of her husband, her grief, the spreading of the COVID-19 pandemic, and the resurgent Black Lives Matter movement, appeared in the September 2020 issue of Vanity Fair, guest-edited by Ta-Nehisi Coates.

In 2022, the U.S. Library of Congress selected Ward as the winner of the Library's Prize for American Fiction. At age 45, Ward is the youngest person to receive the Library's fiction award for her lifetime of work.

In July 2024, she was one of only three authors (with Elena Ferrante and George Saunders) to have the most books (three) in "The 100 Best Books of the 21st Century", a New York Times survey of 503 literary figures.

== Personal life ==
Ward lives in Mississippi and has three children. Her husband, Brandon R. Miller, died in January 2020 of acute respiratory distress syndrome at the age of 33. Ward wrote about his death in an article for Vanity Fair.

== Recognition ==
=== Literary prizes ===
Year	Title	Award	Category	Result	Ref.
2008	Where the Line Bleeds	First Novelist Award	—	Finalist	
2009	Where the Line Bleeds	Hurston/Wright Legacy Award	Fiction	Nominated	
2011	Salvage the Bones	National Book Award	Fiction	Won	
2012	Salvage the Bones	Alex Awards	—	Won	
2012	Salvage the Bones	Dayton Literary Peace Prize	Fiction	Finalist	
2012	Salvage the Bones	Hurston/Wright Legacy Award	Fiction	Nominated	
2012	Salvage the Bones	Young Lions Fiction Award	—	Finalist	
2013	Men We Reaped	National Book Critics Circle Award	Autobiography/Memoir	Finalist	
2014	Men We Reaped	Chicago Tribune Heartland Prize	Non-Fiction	Won	
2014	Men We Reaped	Dayton Literary Peace Prize	Nonfiction	Finalist	
2014	Men We Reaped	Hurston/Wright Legacy Award	Nonfiction	Nominated	
2017	Sing, Unburied, Sing	Goodreads Choice Awards	Fiction	Nominated—7th	
2017	Sing, Unburied, Sing	Kirkus Prize	Fiction	Finalist	
2017	Sing, Unburied, Sing	Los Angeles Times Book Prize	Fiction	Finalist	
2017	Sing, Unburied, Sing	National Book Award	Fiction	Won	
2017	Sing, Unburied, Sing	National Book Critics Circle Award	Fiction	Finalist	
2017	Sing, Unburied, Sing	Reading Women Award	Fiction	Shortlisted	
2018	Sing, Unburied, Sing	Andrew Carnegie Medals for Excellence	Fiction	Finalist	
2018	Sing, Unburied, Sing	Anisfield-Wolf Book Award	Fiction	Won	
2018	Sing, Unburied, Sing	Aspen Words Literary Prize	—	Shortlisted	
2018	Sing, Unburied, Sing	BCALA Literary Awards	Fiction	Honor	
2018	Sing, Unburied, Sing	Dayton Literary Peace Prize	Fiction	Finalist	
2018	Sing, Unburied, Sing	Hurston/Wright Legacy Award	Fiction	Nominated	
2018	Sing, Unburied, Sing	Indies Choice Book Awards	Adult Fiction	Won	
2018	Sing, Unburied, Sing	NAACP Image Awards	Fiction	Shortlisted	
2018	Sing, Unburied, Sing	PEN/Faulkner Award for Fiction	—	Finalist	
2018	Sing, Unburied, Sing	Women's Prize for Fiction	—	Shortlisted	
2019	Sing, Unburied, Sing	International Dublin Literary Award	—	Longlisted	
2019	Sing, Unburied, Sing	Mark Twain American Voice in Literature Award	—	Won	
2023	Let Us Descend	Kirkus Prize	Fiction	Finalist	
2023	Let Us Descend	Libby Book Award	Adult Fiction	Finalist	
2023	Let Us Descend	Libby Book Award	Historical Fiction	Won	
2024	Let Us Descend	Andrew Carnegie Medals for Excellence	Fiction	Finalist	
2024	Let Us Descend	Aspen Words Literary Prize	—	Longlisted	
2024	Let Us Descend	NAACP Image Awards	Fiction	Shortlisted	
2024	Let Us Descend	Southern Book Prize	Fiction	Finalist	

=== Other ===
- 2018 Time 100
- 2022 Library of Congress Prize for American Fiction

== Works ==
=== Fiction ===
- —— (2008). Where the Line Bleeds (paperback ed.). Chicago: Agate Publishing. ISBN 9781932841381.
- —— (2011). Salvage the Bones (hardcover 1st ed.). New York: Bloomsbury Publishing. ISBN 9781608195220.
- —— (2017). Sing, Unburied, Sing (hardcover 1st ed.). New York: Scribner. ISBN 9781501126079.
- —— (2023). Let Us Descend (hardcover 1st ed.). New York: Scribner. ISBN 9781982104498.

=== Nonfiction ===
- —— (2013). Men We Reaped (hardcover 1st ed.). New York: Bloomsbury Publishing. ISBN 9781608195213.
- —— (2016). The Fire This Time: A New Generation Speaks About Race (hardcover 1st ed.). New York: Scribner. ISBN 9781501126345.
- —— (2020). Navigate Your Stars (hardcover 1st ed.). New York: Scribner. ISBN 9781982131326.
- —— (2026). On Witness and Respair. Scribner. ISBN 9781668064269.
