= Kima Jones =

Writer and literary publicist

- Born: 1981 or 1982 (age 43–44); Harlem, New York
- Occupations: Writer, poet, book publicist
- Organization: Jack Jones Literary Arts

Kima Jones (born c. 1982) is an American writer, poet and literary publicist. She is the founder of the Jack Jones Literary Arts, a literary publicity firm.

== Early life and education ==
Jones was born circa 1982 in Harlem, New York (in particular, the Sugar Hill neighborhood), the oldest of eight siblings. Her grandfather was a Southern Baptist minister and her father an imam. Jones took an early interest in writing, winning a poetry contest in elementary school to give a reading at the Schomburg Center for Research in Black Culture with children's author Walter Dean Myers. In this period, Jones lived in foster care but at 12 was reunited with her family, moving to Poughkeepsie, New York. Her mother and stepfather especially encouraged her reading. The latter, a professor at Marist College, gave her boxes of his extra books; one of these included Mary Helen Washington's collection Black-Eyed Susans and Midnight Birds: Stories by and about Black Women and after reading the anthology cover to cover, Jones turned to the book's index to create another reading list for herself.

Jones attended Dutchess Community College, then Sarah Lawrence College, though she ultimately left without finishing a degree.

== Career ==
Jones moved to Los Angeles, California, when she won PEN Center USA Emerging Voices fellowship in 2013. In 2015, she founded Jack Jones Literary Arts literary publicity firm, specializing in working with writers from historically underrepresented backgrounds, predominantly writers of color. Jones has said that her own background as "a queer black girl from Harlem" made the work of women of color like Sandra Cisneros and Toni Morrison especially important to her growing up. Her first two clients were Tananarive Due and Dolen Perkins-Valdez. From there, her roster expanded to include Tyehimba Jess, representing his poetry collection Olio for which he won the Pulitzer Prize; Angie Thomas, for her bestselling debut young adult novel The Hate U Give; Rion Amilcar Scott, who won the 2017 PEN America Robert W. Bingham Emerging Fiction Prize for his book Insurrections; and Desiree Cooper, who won the 2017 Midland Authors Award in Adult Fiction for Know the Mother. Jones's firm also runs an annual writers retreat for women of color.

Jones has been a recipient of the MacDowell, Yaddo and Lambda Literary fellowships. She contributed the 2014 anthology Long Hidden: Speculative Fiction from the Margins of History and to Roxane Gay's 2018 online anthology Unruly Bodies. Her poem "Homegoing AD" was published in Jesmyn Ward's collection The Fire This Time: A New Generation Speaks About Race, then anthologized in The Best American Non-Required Reading 2017, edited by Sarah Vowell.

In 2018, Jones was named to The Root 100, The Root's "annual list of the most influential African Americans, ages 25 to 45."

In 2021, Triangle House Literary announced its hire of Jones as literary agent.

In 2020, it was announced that Knopf had purchased Jones' debut memoir, Butch. It is set to be released in fall 2023. She is the 2022 recipient of the Granum Foundation Prize.
