= How the Word Is Passed =

2021 book by Clint Smith

How the Word Is Passed: A Reckoning with the History of Slavery Across America
- Author: Clint Smith
- Language: English
- Genre: African American History
- Publisher: Little, Brown
- Publication date: June 1st, 2021
- Publication place: United States
- Pages: 352
- ISBN: 978-0316492935

How the Word Is Passed: A Reckoning with the History of Slavery Across America is a 2021 nonfiction book written by author Clint Smith and published by Little, Brown. The work examines slavery in America. The text includes visits to a variety of historical landmarks/monuments and describes how each entity depicts the history of American slavery. Smith was awarded the National Book Critics Circle Award for Nonfiction (2021), the Stowe Prize (2022), the Dayton Literary Peace Prize (2022) and the Hillman Prize for Book Journalism (2022) for the book.

== Summary ==
How the Word Is Passed features journeys to Monticello Plantation, Whitney Plantation, Angola Prison, Blandford Cemetery, Galveston, Texas, New York City, and Goree Island. With each visit, Smith analyzes how preservative structures within American society (monuments, road names, holidays, neighborhoods, etc.) can reflect deep, conflicting, foundational truths within America’s past. Smith also considers how the cumulative writing and rewriting of history affects the current societal perception of American slavery.

== Honors and awards ==
- Winner of the Stowe Prize (2022)

- Winner of Hillman Prize for Book Journalism (2022)

- Winner of the Dayton Literary Peace Prize (2022)

- Winner of the National Book Critics Circle Award for Nonfiction (2021)

- New York Times’ “10 Best Books of 2021”

- Time Magazine’s "10 Best Nonfiction Books of 2021”
