= Sing, Unburied, Sing =

2017 novel by Jesmyn Ward

- First edition cover
- Author: Jesmyn Ward
- Language: English
- Genre: Southern Gothic, Suspense, coming-of-age, literary fiction
- Publisher: Scribner
- Publication date: September 5, 2017
- Publication place: United States
- Media type: Print (hardback & paperback)
- Pages: 285
- Preceded by: Men We Reaped

Sing, Unburied, Sing is the third novel by the American author Jesmyn Ward and published by Scribner in 2017. It focuses on a family in the fictional town of Bois Sauvage, Mississippi. The novel received overwhelmingly positive reviews, and was named by The New York Times as one of the 10 Best Books of 2017. The novel won the 2017 National Book Award for Fiction.

== Plot ==
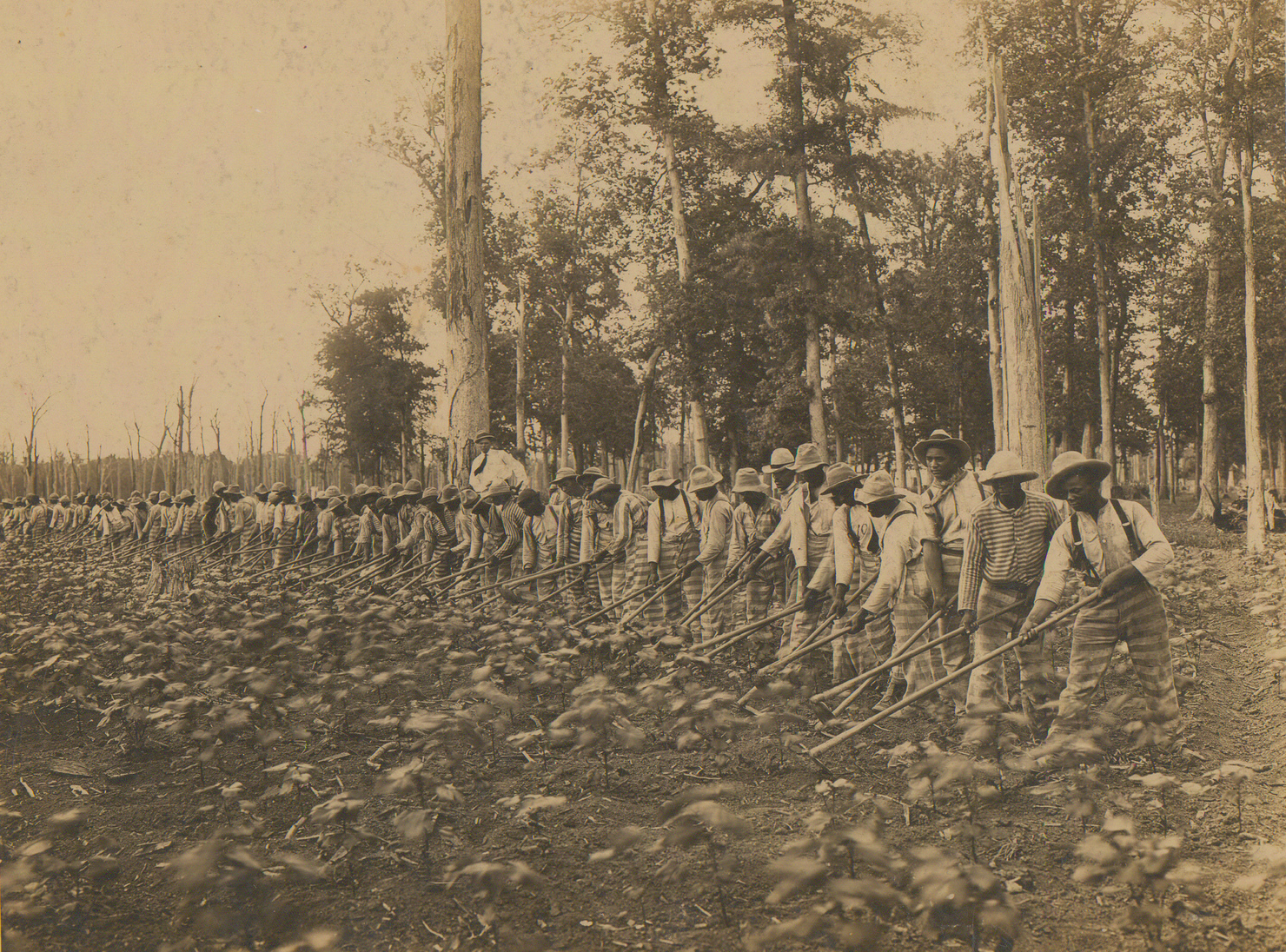
African-American inmates working in the Parchman penitentiary, 1911

The novel begins on Jojo's thirteenth birthday. Jojo tries to help his grandfather, Pop, kill a goat but he is sickened by the slaughter. While Pop is cooking the goat stew, he tells Jojo about how he was sent to Parchman prison with his older brother, Stag, where Pop met Richie a 12-year-old inmate.

Leonie receives a call from Michael, Jojo and Kayla's father, informing Leonie that he is being released from prison. The next day Leonie argues with Pop about whether she should take Jojo and Kayla with her on the trip to get Michael. At Mam's suggestion Leonie invites her coworker Misty, whose boyfriend is also incarcerated in Parchman. While she talks to her mom, Leonie realizes that Mam's cancer is getting worse.

Leonie makes a stop at the house of a white woman, where Jojo finds a man cooking meth. Misty leaves the woman's house with a bag of meth that she tries to hide from Jojo and Kayla.

Back in the car, Kayla begins to get sick. Leonie remembers Mam teaching her about plants that help with an upset stomach. Leonie needs wild strawberries but is only able to find wild blackberries. Jojo holds Kayla and tries to comfort her by telling her stories. Eventually, they stop for the night at the house of Al, Michael's lawyer. Leonie tries to make a medicinal recipe with the blackberry leaves. Jojo doesn’t trust Leonie and doesn’t think the wild blackberries will help, but he is afraid Leonie will hit him if he says anything. After Leonie, Misty, and Al leave the room, Jojo forces Kayla to throw up Leonie's mixture.

In the morning they drive to Parchman and check Michael out of prison. When Michael comes out, he embraces Leonie. He tries to hold Kayla but she doesn’t recognize him. Kayla throws up again. Jojo looks outside the car and sees the ghost of Richie.

The next chapter is narrated by Richie. He recognizes Jojo as Pop's child and recalls how Pop protected him while they were in Parchman. No one in the car except for Jojo and Kayla can see Richie.

Returning to the present car ride, the group is pulled over by a police officer. There is no time to hide the meth, so Leonie swallows it. Leonie tells the officer that they are coming back from Parchman. The officer handcuffs Leonie and Michael. Jojo exits the car with Kayla and the officer handcuffs him too. When the officer handcuffs and pulls his gun on Jojo Misty drops Kayla, who runs to Jojo and wraps herself around him. Kayla throws up on the officer who lets everyone go.

When they arrive back at Michael's parents' house, his mother is at first civil and urges Michael's dad, Big Joseph, to do the same. However, Big Joseph is unable to restrain himself and calls Leonie a slur. Michael head-butts Big Joseph, and they start fighting. Unwelcome at Michael's family home they drive back to Pop and Mam's house. Leonie goes to see Mam, who tells her to gather necessary items to perform a ritual to summon Maman Brigitte, a death loa in voodoo. Richie sees Pop and tries to talk to him, but Pop is unable to see him.

Jojo asks Pop about what happened to Richie, so Pop finally tells Jojo. A man named Blue raped one of the female inmates at Parchman. Richie caught Blue in the act and escaped Parchman with him. While they were running, Blue happened upon a white girl and ripped her dress. The girl then reported this incident, so the local white population decided to seek revenge by lynching Blue. Pop knew that the white men wouldn't make a distinction between Blue and Richie. When the white men caught up with Blue and Richie, they skinned Blue alive and cut off parts of his body. To protect Richie from the same fate, Pop stabbed him in the neck, killing him quickly. Pop has been haunted by this action ever since. After he tells Jojo the story, he breaks down in tears, and Jojo consoles him. Richie's ghost screams and disappears.

Leonie enters Mam's room to find her in a terrible state. Mam tells Leonie that it is too late. Mam sees a vengeful Richie on the ceiling. Richie shouts at Mam, urging her to come with him, but Given shouts at him that Mam is not his mother. Jojo and Pop run in and Leonie jumps into action and begins saying the litany to summon Maman Brigitte. Jojo tells Richie to leave because nobody owes him anything anymore. Richie leaves and Given takes Mam with him. Mam dies. Michael comes back, and he and Leonie leave together.

In the final chapter, Jojo explains that he sleeps in Leonie's bed now. Leonie and Michael only come home a few days a week. They are described as "fish-thin" as a result of their worsening addictions. Pop sleeps in Mam's room now and talks to himself at night, searching for Mam. Jojo is not able to see the ghosts of Mam and Given; he only sees Richie. He also sees other ghosts depicted in the branches of a large tree who have all died through violent means. Kayla tells the ghosts to go home, but they don’t listen to her. She begins to sing and they all smile with relief.

== Characters ==
Joseph "Jojo" is a main character and one of three narrators. Named after his paternal grandfather, he is the child of Michael, who is white, and Leonie, who is Black. The story starts on his thirteenth birthday at his maternal grandparents' house in the fictional town of Bois Sauvage, Mississippi. Throughout the book, Jojo often acts as a parent to his younger sister Kayla because his mother, Leonie, is not always present. Because of his strained relationship with his mother, Jojo looks up to his grandfather, who has been more of a paternal figure while Jojo's father was in prison, and wishes to be like him. Throughout the book, Jojo has many conversations with spirits while helping them move on to the afterlife.

Leonie Stone is the daughter of River and Philomène and mother to Jojo and Kayla. She is the second of three narrators of the story. Leonie became pregnant at 17, not certain she wanted to be a mother. The trauma of her younger life leads Leonie to cope by turning to drugs. The high from the drugs gives her the ability to see her deceased brother, Given. Leonie is consumed by her love for Michael and is inattentive to the needs of her children. Leonie and Michael previously had plans to move to California together which were interrupted by the birth of Jojo, creating a rift between the two. She is also jealous of her children's relationship because it reminds her of the brother she lost too early in life and her failures as a mother, since Jojo takes on more of her parental role.

River (Pop) Stone is Jojo's and Kayla's maternal grandfather. He is the father of Leonie and Given. He is the main parental figure in Jojo's life, which makes him the role model Jojo looks up to. He is quietly dignified and capable. Pop spent some time in Parchman prison when he was young and developed a "care giver" relationship with another inmate, Richie. Pop shares pieces of his stories with Jojo about Richie and Parchman throughout the book. In prison, he was known as River Red.

Philomène (Mam) Stone is Jojo and Kayla's maternal grandmother. She is the mother of Leonie and Given. She comes from a long line of women who can heal and communicate with dead people. This gift was not passed on to her daughter, Leonie, but instead to her grandchildren. Mam steps up to look after Jojo and Kayla when she realizes Leonie does not care enough for her children. Mam is sick with cancer when the novel begins and becomes bedridden from chemotherapy treatments, which ultimately forces Leonie to step up as a motherly figure.

Misty is Leonie's white friend from work. Misty and Leonie are bound to each other by their drug addiction and their bond over both being in interracial relationships. Misty joins Leonie on a road trip to Parchman prison to pick up Michael after his release.

Michael Ladner is Leonie's boyfriend and the father of Jojo and Kayla. He is white and comes from a racist family that doesn’t accept his relationship with Leonie or their kids. Michael, however, is not racist. At the beginning of the novel, he is incarcerated in the Mississippi State Penitentiary, also known as Parchman Farm, for drug trafficking. He then rejoins his family after Leonie and their children pick him up. Like Leonie, Michael is an absent parent who also has a drug addiction issue. Before he was incarcerated, Michael worked as a rig welder on the Deepwater Horizon. He survived the explosion but knew the eleven men that were killed. His experiences on the oil rig impacted him greatly and cause him nightmares.

Michaela (Kayla) is Jojo's three-year-old little sister, named after her father Michael. She interacts with Jojo as a parental figure and prefers him to her mother, Leonie. Kayla, like Jojo, is able to see ghosts. Kayla is given the final word of "shh" to her brother. Kayla is emblematic of the future. Through Kayla's voice in the final scene, Ward ends this novel on an optimistic note.

Given Stone is Leonie's older brother who was murdered on a hunting trip by Michael's cousin when he was a senior in high school. Given played football in high school and was thought to have a promising college athletic career ahead of him. Leonie sees Given's ghost throughout the novel, especially when she uses drugs. It is not until the penultimate chapter that Given's ghost is freed, and Leonie does not see him anymore.

Richie knows River from their time spent together in Parchman. He was imprisoned in Parchman at twelve years old for stealing food to feed his nine siblings. Richie tried to escape later with an inmate named Blue, who was skinned and killed during their failed attempt. River killed Richie to spare him from any further pain he would face as a result of the white mob that would have inevitably killed him in a similar manner to Blue. Richie's ghost follows Jojo back to Pop after Jojo arrives to pick up his father from Parchman. Richie is the third narrator of the story and he struggles to understand and accept his death.

Big Joseph Ladner is Michael's father. He does not have a good relationship with his son and the rest of the family because Michael is in a relationship with Leonie, a Black woman. Big Joseph was present at the trial for his nephew after shooting Leonie’s brother prior to her and Michael’s relationship which adds to Leonie’s discomfort with Big Joseph. When Michael, Leonie, Jojo, and Kayla visit him, it results in Big Joseph and Michael physically fighting.

Maggie Ladner is Michael's mother. She, also, does not have a healthy relationship with her son, but unlike her husband, she tries to make an effort. She inhospitably welcomes Michael, Leonie, Jojo, and Kayla into her home in an effort to salvage her relationship with her son, but will not stand up to her husband.

Al is Michael's lawyer. He is assumed to be addicted to drugs, presumably meth.

== Themes ==
Sing, Unburied, Sing is the first of Ward's novels to introduce a supernatural element. A dead boy, Richie, is one of the narrators, and other ghosts are found throughout the novel as they tie the past to the present and future. Likewise, Mam and Pop project a belief in spirituality through gris-gris bags, which contain objects of nature that are assumed to administer power for humans. In the novel, the spiritual connection between nature and man is prevalent through their African-based traditions.

The novel demonstrates the afterlife of slavery in America. Songs and storytelling play a role in building resilience. Singing to the restless spirits at the end of the story, Kayla represents hope for the future. This theme is also represented through the prison system in which many black people, especially black men, are imprisoned unethically and forced to do hard labor in the fields of Parchman which was once a plantation but was turned into a Prison. Parchman has been described as “the quintessential penal farm, the closest thing to slavery that survived the civil war.” Even though the 13th Amendment abolished slavery and involuntary servitude, it created a loophole that allowed for the continued exploitation of incarcerated people, who were then and now, disproportionately Black. Both Pop (River) and Richie's stories share the haunting reality of this unjust recreation of slavery within Southern America.

Another theme is family, for it offers differing insights into the roles of parenting. In the beginning, we see that Jojo refers to his parents by their first names, Leonie and Michael. Though they care for Jojo and Kayla, Leonie and Michael are absent mother and father figures. They tend to dissociate themselves from their responsibilities through drug usage. Thus, Jojo looks to his Pop and Mam as the family's caretakers. Jojo also takes on the task of being Kayla's guardian, protecting her in any way he can. This also shows distrust between members of the family. When Leonie gives Kayla the blackberry mixture, Jojo later forces her to throw it up. He does not trust Leonie to take care of Kayla, because he believes that is his role. Jojo exemplifies parentification, a common feature in abused children or children with absent parents in which the roles are reversed and the children serve the primary parental role in their family.

Racial relations are also discussed throughout the novel through the family's interracial dynamics. Though Michael appears to love Leonie despite their differing skin colors, his family sternly disapproves of the life he leads. Michael's father, Big Joseph, showcases the lingering tensions of white supremacy in the South. He protects Michael's cousin after killing Given, since the cousin was upholding Southern ideals of Black inferiority. In the same manner, Big Joseph rejects his own son, Michael, for defying this tradition with his bi-racial children.

Life versus Death is a reoccurring theme throughout the story beginning with Jojo's story. He opens the story with the line, “I like to think I know what death is. I like to think it is something I could look at straight.” This is followed by a scene where Jojo helps Pop slaughter a goat. This scene reminds us of Jojo's innocence as a child even though he has to act grown up in this world. This death scene immediately presents over the rest of the story, looms over the characters, reminding them of the constant presence of death in their lives and how it continues to affect them and eventually will take them from this world. The presence of the ghosts, Richie and Given, play with the theme of death in relation to the afterlife. Although both characters are actually dead, they continuously live through the other characters and through Pop's stories of Richie. Their interactions with each of the characters influence the character's thoughts and actions, especially Jojo's, as his life parallels with Richie's story. Mam's looming sickness and eventual passing also reveal the influence of death over each of her family's lives as they have to cope with a passing that they knew was coming. The moment when she is brought to the afterlife by Given is also a pivotal moment between the interaction of life and death.

Song and singing are also important themes throughout the novel. As the book's title indicates, singing also plays a powerful role as a symbol and metaphor. The song of the world represents the spirit that, according to the book, haunts it all. Mam and Pop describe the song of the world as a symbol of the "spirit" which lives in everything on Earth. We see the song connecting the natural and supernatural world at the end of the novel through Kayla. At the end of the novel, Kayla sings to the spirits to go home which is her way of connecting with them. This scene also is a play on the title, because it is telling these spirits who died of violence to sing and tell their stories. Once they have sung or told their stories, then they can ascend to the spiritual world, which is what Richie was intending to do. Also, from a cultural perspective, singing is an important element of African-American history, as it played a part in the transmission of African culture by enslaved people and their descendants.

The theme of the relationship between humans and animals plays a major role in this novel. The novel focuses on the differences between animals and humans and at times blurs the lines between the two. Often in the novel characters are given animal-like descriptions. One example comes after Richie has been whipped "When that whip cracked in the air and came down on his back he sounded like a puppy." Another comes when Kayla grows ill on the car ride to Parchman, and Jojo says, "Kayla is her most animal self, a worm-ridden cat in my arms." Passages like these call into question the divide between humans and animals. They ask if humans are treated like animals and whether there is any real divide between the two. Additionally, it forces the reader to be conscious of the tragic nature of an animal's life, in particular farm animals, and what these lives might mean in connection with human lives.

This theme of human-animal relationships is first introduced in the opening scene as Jojo and Pop kill a goat, and it is also reflected throughout the novel as characters like Blue are slaughtered in the same way an animal might be. Ward uses the similarities between the way humans treat animals and the way they treat one another to introduce a larger theme of mercy in the novel. Pop shows mercy towards Richie by giving him a much swifter and painless death than the one waiting for him, but this act of mercy only brings Pop guilt. Ward raises questions about the ties between mercy and death when Mam requests a merciful death from Leonie and when Pop "wrestles the goat like it's a man" before giving it a quick death.

Finally, the theme of water is significant throughout the novel. Water symbolizes the processes of nurturing and developing. Those with water, like River and Mam (who is referred to as the saltwater woman) are able to bloom. Meanwhile, those without water, like those in "Parchman," are withering away without subsistence, unable to find peace and stability. Jojo frequently mentions being thirsty while he, Kayla, Leonie, and Misty drive to Parchman to get his father. He steals drinks and food to feed himself and Kayla but makes sure to provide for Kayla first. When Mam is dying, Leonie gives her a glass of water, and when Leonie is passed out after ingesting drugs in the car, she dreams she and her family are drowning. Even the setting in the Mississippi Delta may suggest the importance of water in the novel.

== Reception ==
Reviewing the novel for The Washington Post, Ron Charles compared it to George Saunders's Lincoln in the Bardo and Toni Morrison's Beloved; at NPR, Annalisa Quinn found it "reminiscent of As I Lay Dying" by William Faulkner.

The novel was selected by Time and The New York Times as one of the top ten novels of 2017. It is also acclaimed as one of the best novels of the year by the New Statesman, the Financial Times, and BBC, all of which are located in London. Former U.S. President Barack Obama included the novel on a list of the best books he read in 2017. Literary Hub ranked it as the second best book of the 2010s, behind only Claudia Rankine’s Citizen: An American Lyric (2014).

The novel won the 2017 National Book Award for Fiction, making Ward the only woman in the prize's history to win twice.

In 2024, The New York Times included Sing, Unburied, Sing on its list of best books of the 21st century, at number 30.

== Awards ==
Year	Award	Category	Result	Ref.
2017	Goodreads Choice Awards	Fiction	Nominated—7th	
2017	Kirkus Prize	Fiction	Finalist	
2017	National Book Award	Fiction	Won	
2017	National Book Critics Circle Award	Fiction	Finalist	
2017	Reading Women Award	Fiction	Shortlisted	
2018	Andrew Carnegie Medals for Excellence	Fiction	Finalist	
2018	Anisfield-Wolf Book Award	Fiction	Won	
2018	Aspen Words Literary Prize	—	Shortlisted	
2018	BCALA Literary Awards	Fiction	Shortlisted	
2018	Dayton Literary Peace Prize	Fiction	Finalist	
2018	Hurston/Wright Legacy Award	Fiction	Shortlisted	
2018	Indies Choice Book Awards	Adult Fiction	Won	
2018	NAACP Image Awards	Fiction	Shortlisted	
2018	PEN/Faulkner Award for Fiction	—	Finalist	
2018	Women's Prize for Fiction	—	Shortlisted	
2019	International Dublin Literary Award	—	Longlisted	
2019	Mark Twain American Voice in Literature Award	—	Won	
