= Clint Smith (writer) =

American poet and teacher (born 1988)

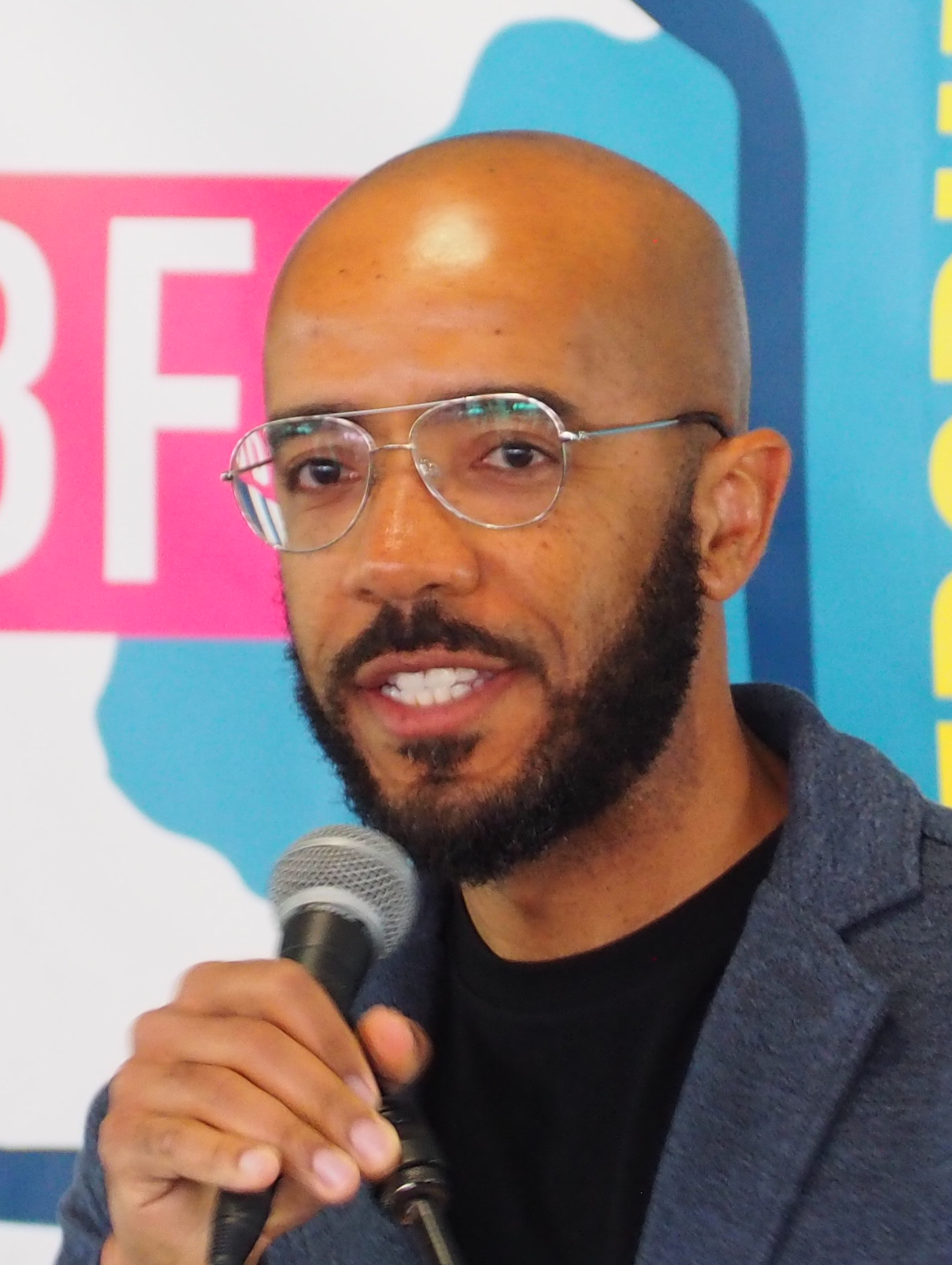
- Smith at the 2024 Gaithersburg Book Festival
- Born: Clinton Smith III; August 25, 1988 (age 38); New Orleans, Louisiana, U.S.
- Education: Davidson College (BA); Harvard University (MA, PhD)
- Website: Official website

Clinton Smith III (born August 25, 1988) is an American writer, poet and scholar. He is the author of the number one New York Times Best Seller How the Word Is Passed, which won the 2021 National Book Critics Circle Award for Nonfiction and was named one of the top ten books of 2021 by the New York Times. He is also the author of two poetry collections, Counting Descent, which was published in 2016, and Above Ground, which was published in 2023.

== Early life and education ==
Of African American heritage, Smith grew up Catholic in New Orleans, where he went to Benjamin Franklin High School for his first three years of high school and later attended the Awty International School in Houston, Texas for his senior year because he and his family fled New Orleans due to Hurricane Katrina. He attended Davidson College, graduating in 2010 with a BA in English, and subsequently obtained a PhD from Harvard University.

== Career ==
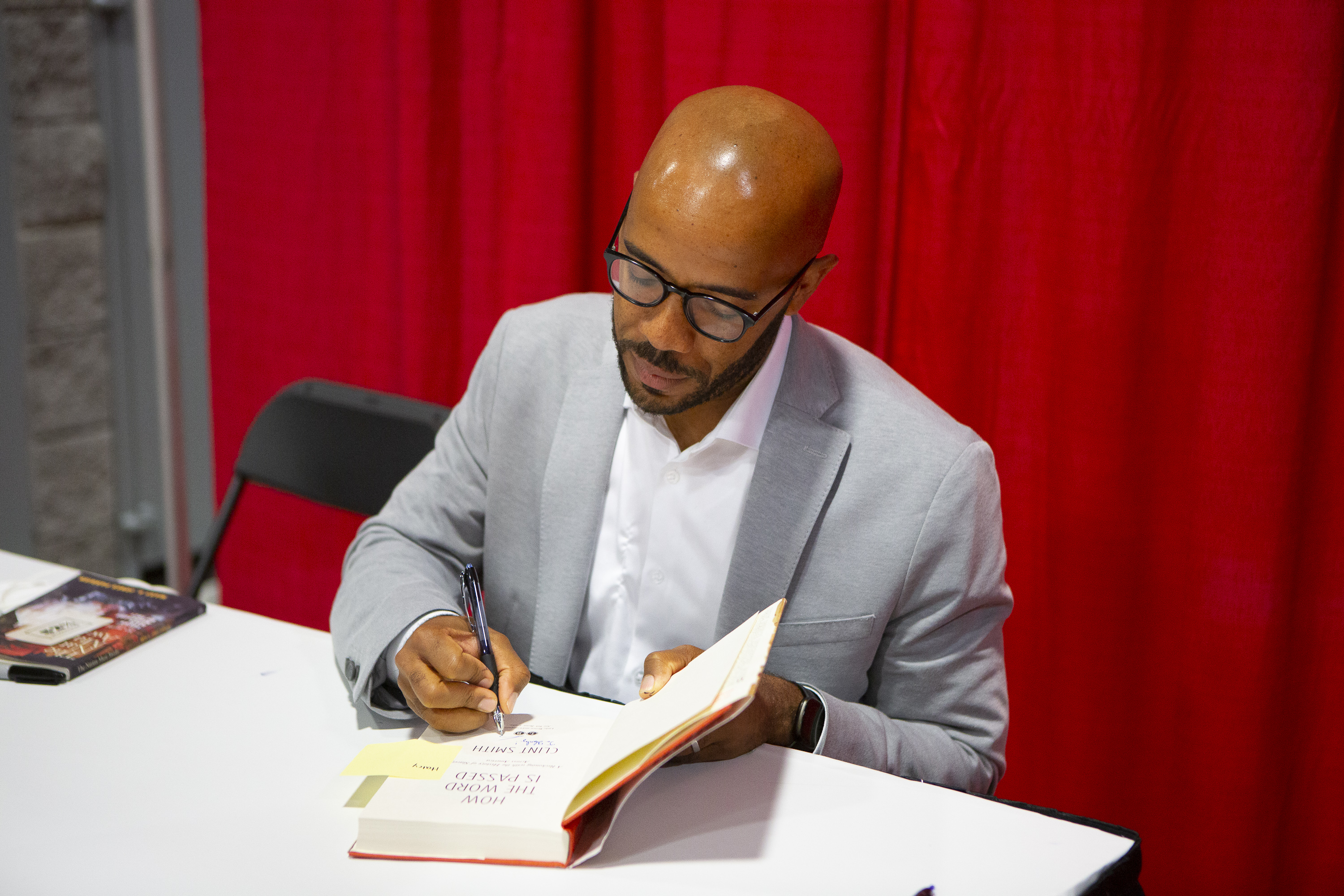
Smith at the National Book Festival in 2022

Smith taught high school English in Prince George's County, Maryland, where he was named the Christine D. Sarbanes Teacher of the Year by the Maryland Humanities Council. He then pursued doctoral work at the Harvard Graduate School of Education with a concentration in Culture, Institutions, and Society, earning his PhD in 2020 with his dissertation focusing how children sentenced to life without parole experience educational programming while they are incarcerated.

He was part of the winning team at the 2014 National Poetry Slam and was a 2017 recipient of the Jerome J. Shestack Prize from The American Poetry Review. Smith published his first book of poetry, Counting Descent, in 2016. It won the 2017 Literary Award for Best Poetry Book from the Black Caucus of the American Library Association and was a finalist for the NAACP Image Award for Outstanding Literary Work – Poetry. He was on the 2018 Forbes 30 Under 30 list and Ebony's 2017 Power 100 list.

Smith has also been a contributor to The New Yorker magazine. His work is included in the anthology The Fire This Time: A New Generation Speaks about Race (2016), edited by Jesmyn Ward. Smith's second book, How the Word Is Passed, was published by Little, Brown and Company on June 1, 2021. It was selected for The New York Times Book Review's "10 Best Books of 2021" list, and it won the Dayton Literary Peace Prize for nonfiction. It was named one of the 50 best twenty-first-century books of literary journalism by GQ magazine and one of the 10 best nonfiction books of 2021 by Time magazine. Smith is set to publish a nonfiction book on untold stories of World War II through Random House in 2027.

He currently serves as a staff writer at The Atlantic, where his piece "Monuments to the Unthinkable" was featured as the cover story in December 2022. The article was also named a finalist for the 2023 National Magazine Awards. He hosted Crash Course's Black American History series, which ran from 2021 until late 2022.

A fan of the Arsenal F.C. association football club and a former college soccer player, Smith has written several essays on the sport.

== Awards and honors ==
- 2014 National Poetry Slam Winner
- 2017 Ebony Power 100 List
- 2017 Black Caucus of the American Library Association Literary Award for Best Poetry Book
- 2017 NAACP Image Award for Outstanding Literary Work – Poetry Finalist
- 2018 Art for Justice Grantee
- 2018 Forbes 30 Under 30
- 2020 New America Emerson Fellow
- 2021 Andrew W. Mellon Foundation Fellow-in-Residence
- 2021 The Root 100
- 2021 National Book Critics Circle Award for Nonfiction
- 2022 Hillman Prize for Book Journalism
- 2022 Stowe Center for Literary Activism Prize for Literary Activism
- 2022 Dayton Literary Peace Prize for Nonfiction
- 2024 NAACP Image Award for Outstanding Literary Work – Poetry Finalist

== Personal life ==
Smith resides in Maryland with his wife and two children.
