= Barbara Grunes =

American writer (born 1931)

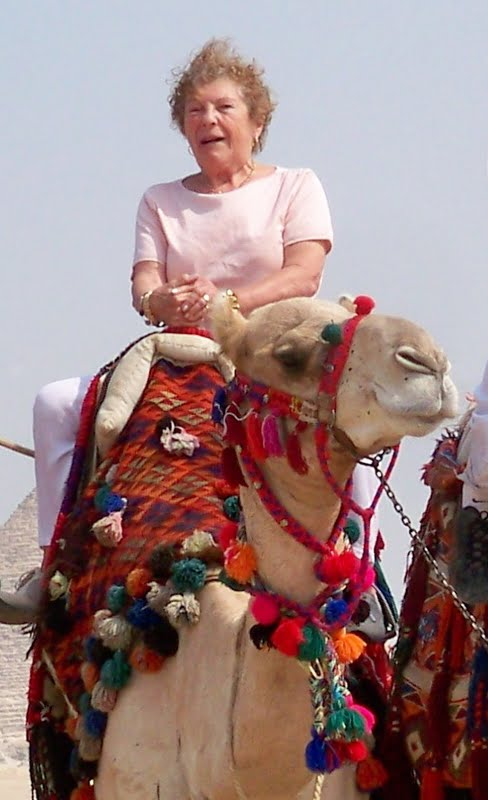
- 2009 Great Pyramids Egypt
- Born: June 12, 1931 (age 95); Boston, Massachusetts, U.S.
- Education: Lesley College, Cambridge, Massachusetts
- Writing career
- Subjects: Grilling; desserts; flourless chocolate cake; Midwest roots and grains; Asian cuisine

Barbara Grunes (born June 12, 1931) is an American food writer based in Chicago. She is the author or co-author of 50+ cookbooks, including an entire series on grill cooking. A food consultant and historian, Grunes has also written on food and dining for the Chicago Sun Times and food consultant to the State of Illinois.

== Early and personal life ==
Barbara Grunes was born in Boston, Massachusetts on June 12, 1931. As a girl she learned how to cook at her mother's side in her family's home in Revere, Massachusetts. She began her career as an education psychologist.

Grunes has five children.

== Career ==
As a newlywed, she asked her husband what he liked to eat. To which he responded, "I quite like Chinese food". After cooking lessons and research her first cookbook, she published her first cookbook, Cuisine de Chine, in 1974 through Dorothy Press in 1974.

== Publications ==
=== Author ===
- Food Processor Cookbook (1969) ISBN 0-8249-3006-1
- Cuisine De Chine Pub. Dorothy Press (1974) ASIN: B00071I2KW
- Oriental Express; Chinese Menus for the Food Processor Good Food Books (1978) ISBN 0-932398-01-4
- The Ultimate food processor cookbook: international recipes & menus. A Fireside book. New York: Simon and Schuster. 1979. ISBN 978-0-671-24591-7.
- Mexican Cookbook Ideals Publishing Corp (1981)
- Dining in--Chicago: a collection of gourmet recipes for complete meals from the area's finest restaurants. Dining in--the great cities. Mercer Island, Wash: Peanut Butter Pub. 1982. ISBN 978-0-89716-108-4. - editor
- Dining in Chicago Volume III (Dining in Series) (1983) Peanut Butter Publishing ISBN 0-89716-125-4
- The Chef's Kitchen Companion (1984)
- Homemade Cookies Pub. Ideals Publishing Corp (1984)
- Lunch and Brunch Cookbook Pub. Ideals Cook Books (1985)
- Fish and Seafood Cookbook Pub. Ideals Cook Books (1985)
- The American Regional Cookbook (1986)
- Joy of BakingIdeals Publishing (1986) ISBN 0-8249-3060-6
- Soups and Stews Pub. Ideals Cook Books (1988)
- Indoor Grilling (A Collection of Recipes Developed for the Burton Stove Top Grills) (1990)
- The Beef Lover's Great Grill Book/Favorite Recipes for Hot and Sizzlin Grilled Beef—As Well As Pork, Veal, Lamb, Game and More (1991)
- Puddings and Pies: Traditional Desserts for a New Generation (1991) ISBN 0-89909-329-9
- Grill It In! A Collection of Recipes Developed for the Burton Stove Top Grills (1991)
- The Home & Grill Cookbook Pub. Cole Publishing (1991)
- Appetizers on the Grill: Innovative Hors D'Oeuvres, Pizzas, Gourmet Sandwiches, and Light Entrees (1992)
- Kabobs on the Grill (1992)
- Skinny Seafood (1st ed.). Chicago: Surrey Books. 1993. ISBN 978-0-940625-59-4.
- Skinny Potatoes - Over 100 Delicious New Low-fat Recipes For The World's Most Versatile Vegetable (1993)
- Heartland Food Society Cookbook Pub. Cole Group (1994)
- Skinny Grilling: Over 100 Inventive Low-Fat Recipes for Grilling Meats, Fish, Poultry, Vegetables, and Desserts (1995)
- Skinny Pizzas: Over 100 Healthy Low-Fat Recipes for America's Favorite Fun Food Pub. The Popular Skinny Cookbook Series, Surrey Books (1996)
- The Heartland Food Society Cookbook: New and Traditional Cuisine (1996) ISBN 978-1-56426-564-7
- Meatless Diabetic Cookbook: Over 100 Easy Recipes Combining Great Taste with Great Nutrition (1997)
- Grill: Cookbook Pub. Williams-Sonoma Cookware (1999)
- Cooking Vegetarian: The Lazy Way Pub. Macmillan Lifestyles Guide (1999)
- All Holidays Menus (Book IV) (2000)
- Healthy Grilling : Sizzling Favorites for Indoor and Outdoor Grills (2001) ISBN 0-9669701-3-6
- Think Thin Pizzas (2002)
- Williams-Sonoma: Roasting (2002) ISBN 978-0-7432-2681-3
- Essentials of Grilling (Williams-Sonoma) (2003) ISBN 0-8487-2757-6
- Al Horno: Roasting, Spanish-Language Edition Pub. Coleccion Williams-Sonoma (Spanish Edition) (2004)
- Diabetes Snacks, Treats, and Easy Eats for Kids: 130 Recipes for the Foods Kids Really Like to Eat with R.D. Linda R. Yoakam (2010) ISBN 1-57284-085-4
- Healthy Grilling: Sizzling Favorites for Indoor and Outdoor Grills (2011) Kindle eBook

== Co-authored ==
- Inside the convection oven. Maplewood, N.J: Good Food Books. 1979. ISBN 978-0-932398-02-4. with Maxine Horowitz and Sandra Kunze
- Food Processor Cookbook with Julie Hogan (1981)
- A Treasury For All Seasons Cookbook - Grill & Barbecue Cooking; Old-fashioned Family Cookbook; Light Menus; All Holiday Menus with L Clarice and Louise Mariano (1984)
- Fish on the Grill: More Than 70 Elegant, Easy, and Delectable Recipes with Phyllis Magida (1986) ISBN 0-8092-3618-4
- Chicago Epicure: A Menu Guide to the Chicago Area's Finest Restaurants with Barbara Revsine Pub. E. Wolf Series of Distinctive Dining (1986)
- The Southwestern Sampler with Phyllis Magida (1987)
- Shellfish on the Grill with Phyllis Magida (1988)
- Gourmet Fish on the Grill: More Than 90 Easy Recipes for Elegant Entertaining with Phyllis Magida (Paperback – Apr 1989) ISBN 0-8092-4596-5
- The Complete Fish Cook/100 Delicious Recipes for Grilling, Sauteing, Broiling, Pan Frying, Smoking, and More with Phyllis Magida (1990)
- Roots: the underground cookbook (1st ed.). Chicago, Ill: Chicago Review Press. 1993. ISBN 978-1-55652-174-4. with Anne Elise Hunt
- Chocolate Classics with Phyllis Magida (1993)
- The Complete Fish on the Grill with Phyllis Magida (1994) ISBN 1-55832-181-0
- Skinny Chocolate/over 100 Sinfully Delicious-Yet Low-Fat-Recipes for Cakes, Cookies, Savories, and Chocoholic Treats with Phyllis Magida (1994) ISBN 978-0-940625-80-8
- All-American Vegetarian: A Regional Harvest of 200 Low-Fat Recipes with Virginia Van Vynckt (1995) ISBN 0-8050-3509-5
- The Great Big Cookie Book: Over 200 Scrumptious Recipes for Cookie Lovers with Virginia Van Vynckt (1996) ISBN 978-0-7615-0674-4
- All-American Waves of Grain: How to Buy, Store, and Cook Every Imaginable Grain with Virginia Van Vynckt (May 1997)
- The Ultimate Cookie Cookbook with Virginia Van Vynckt (1999)
- The Complete Idiot's Guide to Grilling with Virginia Van Vynckt (1999)
- Complete Grilling Cookbook (Williams Sonoma Kitchen Library) co-author (2001)
- Wok Every Day with Sheri Giblin and Virginia Van Vynckt (2003) ISBN 0-8118-3195-7
- The Best Bake Sale Ever Cookbook with Susie Cushner (2007)
- The Williams-Sonoma Baking Book coauthor (2009) Pub. Weldon Owen Inc. ISBN 978-1-60320-107-0
- Very Merry Cookie Party: How to Plan and Host a Christmas Cookie Exchange with Virginia Van Vynckt (2010)
- Diabetes Cooking 101 coauthor (2011) Pub. Agate Publishing ISBN 1-57284-127-3
