= Men We Reaped =

2013 memoir by Jesmyn Ward

- First edition
- Author: Jesmyn Ward
- Language: English
- Genre: Memoir
- Published: September 17, 2013
- Publisher: Bloomsbury
- Publication place: United States
- Pages: 256
- ISBN: 978-1-608-19521-3

Men We Reaped is a memoir by the African-American writer Jesmyn Ward. The book was published by Bloomsbury in 2013. The memoir focuses on Ward's own personal history and the deaths of five Black men in her life over a four-year span between 2000 and 2004. Men We Reaped won the Heartland Prize for non-fiction, and was nominated for the National Book Critics Circle Award for Autobiography and the Hurston/Wright Legacy Award for Nonfiction.

== Source of the title ==
The book's title comes from a Harriet Tubman quotation, on the occasion of the unsuccessful assault of the all-Black 54th Massachusetts Volunteer Infantry upon the Confederate forces at Fort Wagner during the American Civil War:

"We saw the lightning and that was the guns; We heard the thunder and that was the big guns; We heard the rain falling and that was the blood falling; and when we came to get in the crops, it was dead men that we reaped."

== Synopsis ==
Five men in Ward's life die in the space of four years. All are Black men between the ages of 19–32, including her brother, Joshua, killed by a white drunk driver. Though seemingly unconnected, Ward takes her readers on a journey—personal, familial and communal—showing how they were in reality bonded by identity and place, and how race, poverty, and gender predetermined the outcome of their lives.

Ward was born in California when her mother was 18 and her father 20. She was born premature and was a sickly child, not expected to survive. Her family later moves to Mississippi, where her parents are from. Ward describes growing up in the poor, small towns of DeLisle and Pass Christian, where her family, like the community around them, experiences a lack of opportunities and an abundance of violence, including from the police, leading many to sink into abuse of drugs and alcohol. She also recounts how in her family, her mother raised her children on her own due to infidelity and abandonment by her husband. Ward contrasts their lives, choices, and experiences, and her own life zig-zagging between them: "What it meant to be a woman: working, dour, full of worry. What it meant to be a man: resentful, angry, wanting life to be everything but what it was."

Ward learns at an early age how girls are treated differently than boys when she gets into trouble for doing things her cousins do freely (smoking), and also seeing how her father gets to spend the family money on a motorcycle and then ride away on it, while her mother works extra hard to put food on the table. She also learns that for her male relatives, being Black is dangerous in America, as her mother and grandmother worry about them being arrested or experiencing violence.

As her mother works long hours as a maid, Ward is expected to care for her younger siblings and the household. She has depression. At school, she experiences bullying. Her mother's rich, white employer offers to pay Ward's tuition for private school. There, however, she must deal with being the only Black girl in a white environment. Attending the private school, she experiences racism and rejection.

Ward's father is now living in New Orleans. When Ward and her siblings visit, their mother sends them with groceries because she doesn't trust him to feed the children. Her brother Joshua moves in with him, and Ward later learns that he is dealing crack to help his father pay bills.

Ward heads out of state for university, to Stanford, becoming the first member of her family to attend college. Her grief for the loss of her brother never leaves her, but she knows it will change over time. Ward closes with her memory of riding in a car with Joshua, declaring, "I don't ride like that anymore", and imagining that when her life is over, Joshua will ride up and ask her to go for one more ride.

The men "reaped" in the book, narrated in reverse of the order in which they died:

- Roger: Ward meets Roger through her sister Charine. Roger dies from a heart attack brought on by a combination of cocaine and pills.
- Demond: Ward meets Demond through her sister Nerissa. Unlike most of the boys she knows, he grew up in stable home with both parents. After testifying in court against a murderer and a drug dealer, Demond is shot in his front yard coming home from work one night.
- C.J.: Ward's cousin. An athletic young man, loyal and protective but who also exhibits erratic behavior and does drugs. He is killed when his car is hit by a train at a crossing with broken signal lights.
- Ronald: A camper at a camp where Ward is a counselor. As an adult, Ronald is seemingly happy and confident, but as it turns out, he is severely depressed and struggles with addiction. Ronald dies by suicide.
- Joshua: Ward's brother and the first of the men to die, shortly after Ward completes her master's degree. Joshua is hit by a drunk driver, a white man who is let off with a token sentence.

== Reception ==
Men We Reaped was enthusiastically received by critics, and was named one of the best books of 2013 by The New York Times Book Review, Publishers Weekly, Time, and Vogue.

In 2024, the New York Times listed Men We Reaped at number 97 on its list of 100 Best Books of the 21st Century.

The Guardian review states that the book is "not for the light-hearted", including as it does "a suicide, two car accidents, a drug overdose and a shooting: tragic tales of young people's lives cut short are interwoven with the disintegration of Ward's parents' marriage and her own sense of drift and isolation." Quoting Ward's assessment of this, "That's a brutal list, in its immediacy and its relentlessness, and it's a list that silences people. It silenced me for a long time", reviewer Gary Younge is thankful she found her voice: "by virtue of a restrained but rich style and gift for storytelling, her book does not read like the litany of woe that one might expect. Melancholic and introspective rather than morbid and self-indulgent, it is really a story of what it is like to grow up smart, poor, black and female in America's deep south." Younge lauds how Ward creates out of the Mississippi Gulf Coast a sort of character in the book, with a vulnerability of its own, as revealed by the devastation of Hurricane Katrina, shortly after the last death recounted in the book. The review concludes: "Anyone who emerges from America's black working-class youth with words as fine as Ward's deserves a hearing. As such The Men We Reaped is an eloquent account of a psychological, sociological and political condition all too often dismissed as an enduring pathology."

The New York Times review acknowledges that Men We Reaped could have been a straightforward memoir of Ward's life, approving of how she narrates her life history; however, lauds how Ward "loops around, again and again" to talk about race and gender in the South, about masculinity, and how it cost her the lives of the five men she lost, about her mother's work as a maid, and heading of the household while her father was absent; about infidelity; and about how she felt as the only Black girl in an all-while school; about the economics of poverty, treatment by the police, and how drugs come to play such a central part in the deaths at the heart of the book. The review notes that on occasion, Ward seems to press upon issues "too hard", but concludes that Men We Reap reaffirms her considerable talent, and calls it "an elegiac book that's rangy at the same time."

NPR's Richard Torres calls Men We Reaped a "superb memoir", that takes the reader behind the statistics of Black deaths, on an ambitious journey into the history of the small deep-south town, Ward's own community and family, and the individual stories, intertwining them capably and sensitively. He writes, "Ward's deceptively conversational prose masks her uncommon skill at imagery. She makes you feel the anguish of each lost life, as well as her survivor's guilt, with its ever-present haunt of memory," and lauds how Ward is "candid enough to paint the flaws in the deceased as well as their good qualities. (In other words, Ward humanizes instead of canonizes.) She's also talented enough to turn such prose into poetry."

Kirkus Reviews summarizes Men We Reaped as "a modern rejoinder to Black Like Me, Beloved and other stories of struggle and redemption—beautifully written, if sometimes too sad to bear", while Publishers Weekly calls it "riveting", and declares that "Ward has a soft touch, making these stories heartbreakingly real through vivid portrayal and dialogue."

== Awards ==
- Chicago Tribune Heartland Prize for Nonfiction (2014)
- Dayton Literary Peace Prize Nominee for NonFiction (2014)
- National Book Critics Circle Award Nominee for Autobiography (2013)
- Hurston/Wright Legacy Award Nominee for Nonfiction (2014)
- Mississippi Institute of Arts and Letters Award for Nonfiction (2014)
- Media for a Just Society Book Award (2014)
