= Where the Line Bleeds =

2008 debut novel by American writer Jesmyn Ward

- 2008 cover from Agate Bolden Books
- Author: Jesmyn Ward
- Language: English
- Genre: Literary fiction
- Publisher: Agate Publishing
- Publication date: November 1, 2008
- Publication place: United States
- Media type: Print
- Pages: 230 pp.
- ISBN: 9781932841381
- OCLC: 223918265

Where the Line Bleeds is the debut novel by American writer Jesmyn Ward. It was published in 2008 by Agate Publishing.

== Background and publication history ==
Ward needed help finding a publisher for the novel. Between this and the low pay she received from her job as a composition instructor, Ward considered abandoning writing to pursue a career in nursing. Before pursuing a different career, Doug Siebold of Agate Publishing accepted the novel, and the company published it in 2008. Shortly after, Ward was awarded a Stegner Fellowship, allowing her to continue writing. The book was reissued by Scribner in 2018.

Some of the characters from the novel later appeared in other books by Ward.

== Plot ==
Where The Line Bleeds follows twin brothers Joshua and Christophe, who were raised by their blind grandmother and had just graduated from high school on the Gulf Coast of Mississippi. Poor and Black, they find few economic opportunities as they struggle to undertake their adult lives.

== Reception ==
The novel received positive reviews. Reviews from Kirkus Reviews and Publishers Weekly praised the novel as a strong debut. In The Austin Chronicle, Elizabeth Jackson compared Ward's style to William Faulkner's. She noted the potential in "a female, black author invoking the (white) father of Southern letters to explore the world of a poor, rural, black family," calling it "an exciting proposition, with original and subversive implications." However, Jackson expresses some reservation, saying Ward's potential remains just that—potential, with some overwritten scenes that Jackson anticipates will improve in future work—but says "this reviewer would rather read such a distinctive voice portraying an underexplored landscape than another white author talking about ivory-tower malaise, any day."

== Awards ==
The novel was shortlisted for the First Novelist Award and the Hurston/Wright Legacy Award.

Year	Award	Category	Result	Ref.
2008	First Novelist Award	—	Finalist	
2009	Hurston/Wright Legacy Award	Fiction	Nominated	
