= Anthony Terlato =

American wine expert (1934–2020)

Anthony Terlato (May 11, 1934 – June 29, 2020) was an Italian-American wine executive who was chairman of Terlato Wines, a Lake Bluff, Illinois-based wine importer, producer and marketer. He has been called "The Father of Pinot Grigio" for his early role in bringing the now-ubiquitous varietal to the American market in the late 1970s when it was practically unknown outside Europe. He has been credited as a key figure in the shift in American wine tastes from "mass-produced, sweet, fortified jug wines ... to the likes of classified-growth Bordeaux, top Italian estates, and the best wineries in California that are enjoyed by many today."

== Early life and education ==
Terlato was originally from Brooklyn. Terlato's career in wine began in 1955 on Chicago's North Side at his father’s wine and spirits store, Leading Liquor Marts. While there, he saw an emerging market for fine wines in the United States.

== Career ==
In 1956, Terlato joined his father-in-law’s wine-bottling firm, Pacific Wine Company. He soon established relationships with Alexis Lichine and Frank Schoonmaker – two pioneer importers. At age 29, Terlato was named president of Pacific Wine Company. In the late 1960s, Terlato expanded Paterno Imports, which imported olive oil, to import fine wines. In 1979, he introduced Santa Margherita Pinot Grigio to the United States and over the next 25 years turned it into one of the most successful wine imports in American history – it was the most popular imported wine in Wine & Spirits magazine's annual restaurant poll from 1995 to 2008. The popularization of this Pinot Grigio helped to make pinot grigio a synonym for a glass of white at innumerable bars and restaurants.

In the late 1980s, Terlato began adding wines from producers throughout Europe. In 1996, he made the family’s first winery purchase: Rutherford Hill Winery in Napa Valley. In 2000, the Terlato family purchased Chimney Rock Winery, also in Napa Valley, and in 2002, they added Sanford Winery in the Sta Rita Hills appellation of Santa Barbara County to their portfolio of wineries.

For his role in introducing Italian wines to America, Terlato was conferred the decoration of Cavaliere Ufficiale, Motu Proprio in 1984, the first American in the wine industry to receive this decoration.

== Personal life ==
In the course of his career, Terlato was exposed to and/or befriended many of the wine and food industry’s notable participants and innovators, including winemakers Baron Phillippe de Rothschild and his daughter Baroness Philippine de Rothschild, Christian Moueix, Jean Michel Cazes, Angelo Gaja, Michel Chapoutier, Michael Twelftree and Robert Mondavi and chef/restaurateurs Julia Child, Jean Joho, Charlie Trotter and Lidia Bastianich.

Terlato died on the morning of June 29, 2020, aged 86.

== Honors and awards ==
- Cavaliere Ufficiale, Motu Proprio, Government of Italy, 1984
- Wine Enthusiast’s Man of the Year Award, 2002
- Wine Spectator’s Distinguished Service Award, 2004
- Horatio Alger Award, 2006
- American Chamber of Commerce in Italy Wine Excellence Award, 2010
- Wine Enthusiast's Lifetime Achievement Award, 2015

== Books ==
Terlato's memoir, TASTE: A Life in Wine was published in 2008 by Agate Publishing. (ISBN 978-1-57284-097-3)

== See also ==
- List of wine personalities
- Kermit Lynch
- Robert Mondavi
