= Salvage the Bones =

2011 novel by Jesmyn Ward

- Author: Jesmyn Ward
- Language: English
- Genre: Fiction
- Publisher: Bloomsbury (US)
- Publication date: August 30, 2011
- Publication place: United States
- Media type: Print (hardback & paperback)
- Pages: 261
- ISBN: 9781608195220
- Preceded by: Where the Line Bleeds
- Followed by: Men We Reaped

Salvage the Bones is the second novel by American author Jesmyn Ward and published by Bloomsbury in 2011. The novel explores the plight of a working-class African-American family in Mississippi as they prepare for Hurricane Katrina and follows them through the aftermath of the storm.

Ward, who lived through Katrina, wrote the novel, after being very "dissatisfied with the way Katrina had receded from public consciousness". The novel was the 2011 recipient of the National Book Award for Fiction.

In an interview with The Paris Review, Ward said she drew inspiration from Medea and the works of William Faulkner.

== Plot summary ==
The novel follows a working-class African-American family living in southern Mississippi in 2005. The Batiste family consists of Daddy (Claude), his daughter Esch (the narrator), and his sons Randall, Skeetah (Jason), and Junior. Their mother died while giving birth to Junior. Skeetah has a close relationship with his pit bull dog China, who gives birth to a litter of puppies at the beginning of the novel. Esch finds out she is pregnant by Manny, a friend of the family's who is dating another girl, Shaliyah. Skeetah and Manny have an altercation at one of Randall's basketball games, and they agree to resolve it through a dog fight. China prevails over Manny's cousin's dog after a vicious fight.

Soon afterwards, Hurricane Katrina hits. The family is forced into the attic and eventually onto the roof as water begins to flood into their home. As the water continues to rise, they make a desperate bid to swim to another house on a hill, but in the maelstrom China and her puppies are lost. After the end of the storm, the entire town has been leveled, Manny refuses to take responsibility for Esch's baby, and Skeetah still holds out hope that he will find China.

== Reception ==
As a winner of the National Book Award for Fiction, the novel received a largely positive reception. The Los Angeles Times described the novel as an "under-the-radar" second novel, which deserves the award. The reviewer described the book as a successful depiction of Southern life and culture and "an intense book, with powerful, direct prose that dips into poetic metaphor". Similarly The New York Times Book Review called the novel "a taut, wily novel, smartly plotted and voluptuously written". Ron Charles of The Washington Post wrote that "it’ll be a long time before its magic wears off" and that the novel has the "aura of a classic about it".
