= Can I Get a Witness? The Gospel of James Baldwin =

- Music: Meshell Ndegeocello
- Setting: Church service
- Basis: The Fire Next Time
- Premiere: December 2016: Harlem Stage, Harlem, New York, United States

Can I Get a Witness? The Gospel of James Baldwin is a 2016 musical theatrical tribute to writer James Baldwin created by musician Meshell Ndegeocello, it debuted in December 2016 at the Harlem Stage in Harlem, New York.

The 2016 world premiere of the show was directed by Charlotte Brathwaite.

== Overview ==
The piece is inspired by James Baldwin's book The Fire Next Time and presents it as a church service.
