= Agate Publishing =

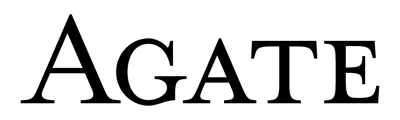
- Status: Active
- Founded: 2002
- Founder: Doug Seibold
- Country of origin: United States
- Headquarters location: Evanston, Illinois
- Distribution: Publishers Group West
- Key people: Doug Seibold, Diana Slickman, Perrin Davis, Kate DeVivo
- Publication types: Trade books, Educational material (Agate Development)
- Nonfiction topics: African-American memoir, Business, Food and Wine, Regional (Midwestern United States)
- Fiction genres: African-American literature
- Imprints: B2, Bolden, Surrey, Midway, Agate Digital
- Official website: www.agatepublishing.com

Agate Publishing is an independent small press book publisher based in Evanston, Illinois, United States. The company, incorporated in 2002 with its first book published in 2003, was founded by current president Doug Seibold. At its inception, Agate was synonymous with its Bolden imprint, which published exclusively African-American literature, an interest of Seibold's and a product of his time working as executive editor for the defunct African-American publisher Noble Press.

Agate has since expanded to include five additional imprints alongside Bolden and its memoir subsidiary Bolden Lives: B2, for business books; Surrey, for cookbooks; Midway, for books with a Midwest/Chicago theme or focus; and Agate Digital, for e-books. Agate additionally publishes customized educational texts by contract under the name Agate Development, formerly known as ProBooks.

== Accolades ==
Agate Publishing, and its founder Doug Seibold, have been singled out among various Chicago publications as emblematic of the city's burgeoning independent publishing scene. Seibold regularly appears on NewCity Lit's "Lit 50: Who Really Books in Chicago," a list of the fifty most influential people in Chicago's literary scene. Starting in 2009, he represented Agate at #24; in 2011, #16; in 2013, #7; and in 2015, his rank improved again to #6. Agate's rising prominence was recognized by the Chicago Reader in its Best of 2014 issue, where it was awarded the superlative "Best Use of Start-Up Mode by a Press No Longer in Start-Up Mode."

=== Critical reception ===
Agate typically releases about twenty books a year, with several achieving national recognition, acclaim, or awards. Freshwater Road, by Denise Nicholas, won the Hurston/Wright Legacy Award for Debut Fiction in 2006. In 2013, Leonard Pitts's Freeman won the Black Caucus of the American Library Association award for best fiction.

Agate titles have also been nominated for multiple NAACP Image Awards, the Believer Book Award, and the International Association of Culinary Professionals Food Writing Award, among others. Jesmyn Ward, who published her debut novel Where the Line Bleeds with Agate, went on to win the National Book Award in 2012.

Hot Doug's: The Book, a Midway nonfiction title by Doug Sohn, the owner and proprietor of the eponymous Chicago "encased meat emporium," was named one of the "Best books of 2013 (so far)" by The A.V. Club. In his writeup, Eric Thurm calls it "the rare successful book that makes you want to put it down: In this case, to catch a plane/train/walk to Hot Doug's."

In particular, Long Division, a Bolden novel by Kiese Laymon, has received substantial attention from the critical and literary communities. It garnered generally positive reviews from all of the "big four" advance review outlets—Kirkus, Publishers Weekly, Library Journal, and Booklist. Additionally, literary journals such as the Los Angeles Review of Books, The Paris Review, and the Boston Review praised the novel. Alyssa Rosenberg of ThinkProgress and The Washington Post wrote that "If Laymon's novel runs into some plotting problems over the course of its run, it succeeds in doing something more emotionally moving, producing a series of crystalline moments when City comes to a clearer understanding of the world he lives in–and the kind of man he wants to be in it." Novelist, professor, and social commentator Roxane Gay, in a piece for The Nation, called Long Division "[an] ambitious novel, and though it is raw and flawed, it is the most exciting book I've read all year. There's nothing like it, both in terms of the scope of what the book tackles and the writing's Afro Surrealist energy." In 2014, the novel was chosen for The Morning News Tournament of Books, but was eliminated in the first round by The Goldfinch, by Donna Tartt in a verdict rendered by Hector Tobar.

== Notable Agate authors ==
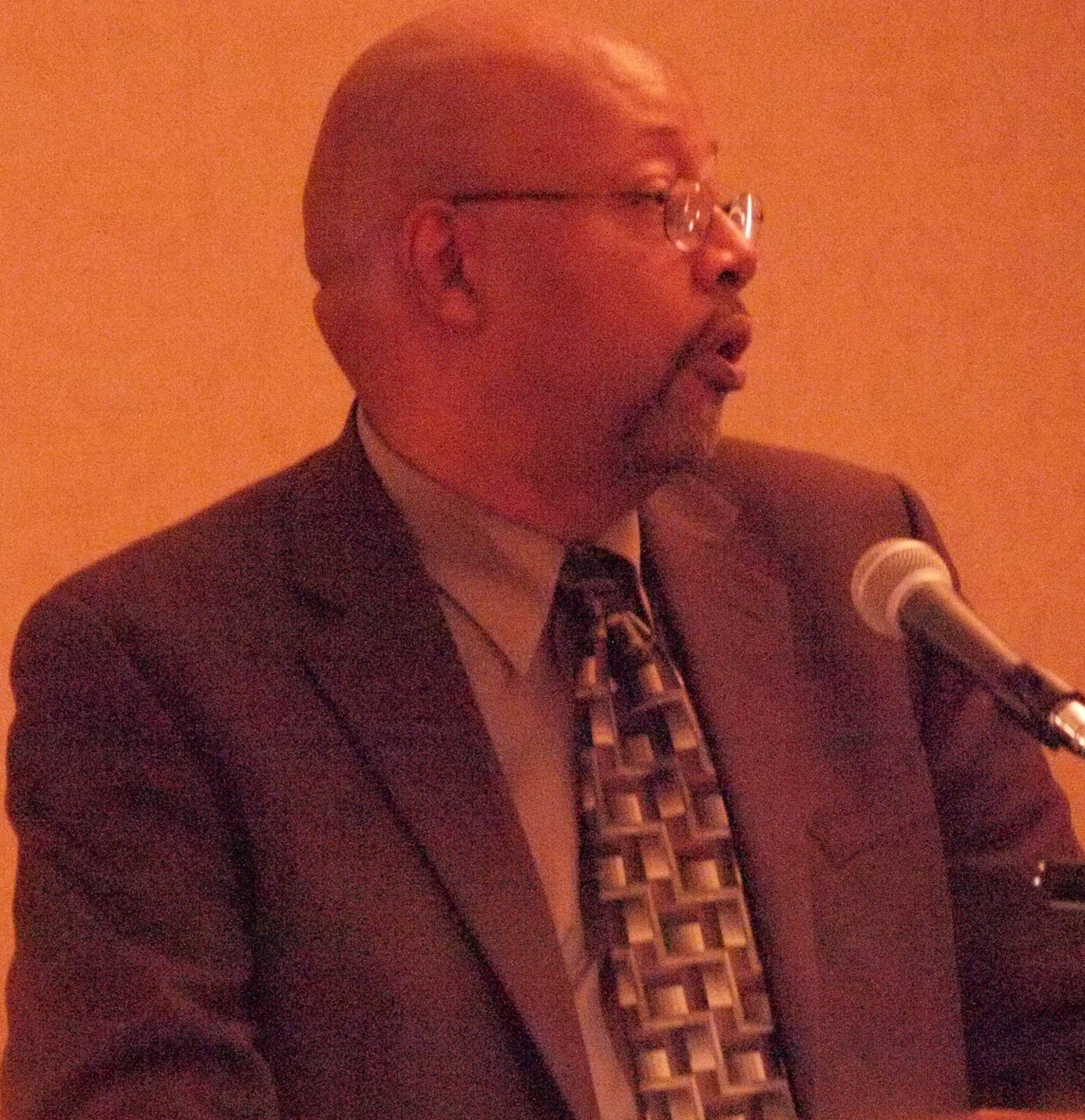
Journalist and commentator Leonard Pitts has published four books with Agate to date.

- Jabari Asim
- Fred Cook, CEO of Golin
- Amy Dickinson
- Barbara Grunes
- Charlayne Hunter-Gault
- Alaya Dawn Johnson
- Kiese Laymon
- Regina Louise
- Deborah Mathis
- Steve McDonagh and Dan Smith
- Jill Nelson
- Denise Nicholas
- Monica Pedersen
- Leonard Pitts
- Gil Robertson IV
- Mary Schmich
- Freda Love Smith, of the Blake Babies
- Doug Sohn, of Hot Doug's
- Anthony Terlato
- Lynn Toler
- Johan Van Overtveldt
- Jesmyn Ward
