= Kandis Williams =

American artist, writer, & publisher

- Born: Park Heights, Baltimore, U.S.
- Education: Cooper Union School of Art; BFA, 2009
- Occupations: artist, editor, publisher, writer
- Website: www.cassandrapress.org

Kandis Williams is an artist, writer, editor, and publisher stationed both in Berlin and Los Angeles. Williams has received critical acclaim for her collage art, performance art, and publishing work. She is best known for her art exploring racial issues, nationalism, and many other categories.

== Biography ==
=== Youth and Education ===
Williams was born in 1985 in Baltimore, Maryland. Due to her love of painting, she would go on to study art in high school at a local art high school and be accepted in to the Cooper Union School of Art in 2003. She found her time there to be a struggle as professors were not as receptive to a black student making art of black people. Many of her professors dismissed the idea of making art of black people just to make art of black people. She would quickly be disillusioned by the white artist scene and the conceptual art focus her professors had. in 2009, Williams would graduate with her Bachelors of Fine Arts from Cooper Union.

After college, Williams completed a couple residences. Her first was in 2016 at the Ace Hotel's art residency, where artist are invited to turn one of the hotel rooms into their studio for a month. This is where Williams created reader, Culture of Fuccboi. Her next residency would be at the Institute of Contemporary Art in Los Angeles, and she stayed there from May 10–June 19, 2021. During this same year, she would also complete a residency at Cassandra Classrooms.

=== Career ===
After William's time in college, she went on to work as a teach in non-profit that taught undeserving youth in community centers and shelters. Her time there opened her eyes to different art practices and visual language of violence through the lens of her students. Some time after, she would move to Berlin, Germany for about twelve years before moving to Los Angeles. She would become a visiting faculty member at California Institute of the Arts in 2019 and ending her time there in 2021. Additionally, she would start teaching in Cassandra Classrooms during 2020 which she teaches at to this day. After ending her time at California Institute of the Arts, she would become a workshop instructor at Haus der Kulturen Der Welt Illiberal Arts Workshop.

During her teaching career and artist practice, Williams would give artist talks and performances all over America and Europe in the years 2014 to 2021.

== Artistic Practice ==
Kandis Williams' work often explores contemporary critical theory including, but not limited to, racial-nationalism, authority, and eroticism. Many of these topics draw from her experiences growing up in Baltimore and her time teaching, and she will incorporated it with historic paintings such as The Slav Epic. She collages images pulled from magazines and archival material to create heavily structured visual dialogues. Additionally, she often goes on production trips to Mexico to manufacture collage elements, and these trips also inspire her works. To this day, she is still inspired by El Lissitzky and Dziga Vertov. Likewise, her performance art explores Institutional racism through a process she calls experimental Pedagogy.

=== Solo Exhibitions ===
- A Line, 52 Walker, New York, New York (2021)

This was her debut show in New York at the David Zwirner gallery in Tribeca.

A Line features large-scale collages of archival photographs of dancers and choreographers featuring icons, such as Alvin Ailey, George Balanchine, and Martha Graham, in addition to Williams own photographs. Some of these collages are annotated with William's thoughts about performance and politics. In addition, there was a video installation presented on old school monitors, and it shows a dancer working through a dance William's choreographed. There is an archival video that flickers on a background screen within each screen. Large artificial plants are scattered across the gallery, and some leaves are covered in flesh tones to return attention to the body.

- A Field, Virginia Commonwealth University Institute for Contemporary Art, Richmond, Virginia (2020 - 2021)

This was her first solo show, and it ran from November 6, 2020 - September 12, 2021.

A Field is a green house filled with plant sculptures made of collages pasted on wire forms. The collages featured on the plant leaves and backdrops are of action shots of laboring bodies. She uses photos from archival documentation of Mississippi chain gangs, images from Vintage Magazines, and depictions of Uruguayan tango dancers. The work as a whole comments on the relation between labor, performance, and sexualization. In addition to the plants, there is a live video, Annexation Tango (2020), that is a combination of photography and found footage. The backgrounds of the video are the former Lorton Reformatory and Virginia State Prison Farm, where prisoners worked as condition for their sentence.

- The Rivers of Styxx, Cooper Cole, Toronto, Canada (2018)
- Eurydice, 219 Madison, Brooklyn, New York (2018)
- Works on Paper, Vienna (2017)
- Soft Colony, Night Gallery, Los Angeles (2016)
- Disfiguring Traditions, SADE, Los Angeles, CA (2016)
- Inner States, St. Charles Projects, Baltimore, Maryland 2016)
- Red Square, OTTOZOO Project, Milan, Italy (2012)
- The Vesica Dialectic, Ficken 3000, Berlin, Germany (2009)

=== Events, Performances, Workshops ===
- Fragile, Berlin (2019)
- A Woman's Work, a PopRally event at MoMA organized by Rachel Kaadzi Ghansah - (2018)
- Human Resources Los Angeles - (2016)

=== Notable Group Exhibitions ===
- Strong, Bright, Useful & True: Recent Acquisitions and Contemporary Art From Baltimore, Irene and Richard Frary Gallery, Johns Hopkins Bloomberg Center in Washington, DC (2025)
- Death of A, The Whitney Biennial 2022, Whitney Museum of American Art, Los Angeles (2022)
- Affect: Network: Territory, The Underground Museum, Los Angeles (2016)
- Stains in the Cowshed, Neu West, Berlin (2015)
- A Constellation, The Studio Museum in Harlem, New York (2015)
- The Oracle, The Underground Museum, Los Angeles (2014)
- Artist Talk 68, Projects, Berlin (2014)
- The Breeder, Athens Greece (2013)

== Cassandra Press ==
Williams co-founded the non-profit Cassandra Press in 2016 with Taylor Doran, and Jordan Nassar. The organization distributes lo-fi activist and academic texts, flyers, posters, pamphlets, and readers as well as offer classes and exhibitions. They also offer artist zines at an affordable price on their website. The mission statement of the organization is to spread ideas and language, propagate dialogue centering ethics, femme-driven activism, and black scholarship.

The name is a reference to the Trojan princess Cassandra, who was said to have accurately foretold the future yet no one would believe her.

To this day, Williams works as a publisher and as an editor for the Cassandra Press. Notable works include: Misogynoir, Reparations, Double Consciousness Then and Now, Libidinal Economy, and Faces of the Colonizer.

== Select Awards and Recognition ==
- 2021 Mohn Award (Hammer Museum) — $100,000
