= Hot Doug's =

Restaurant in Illinois, US

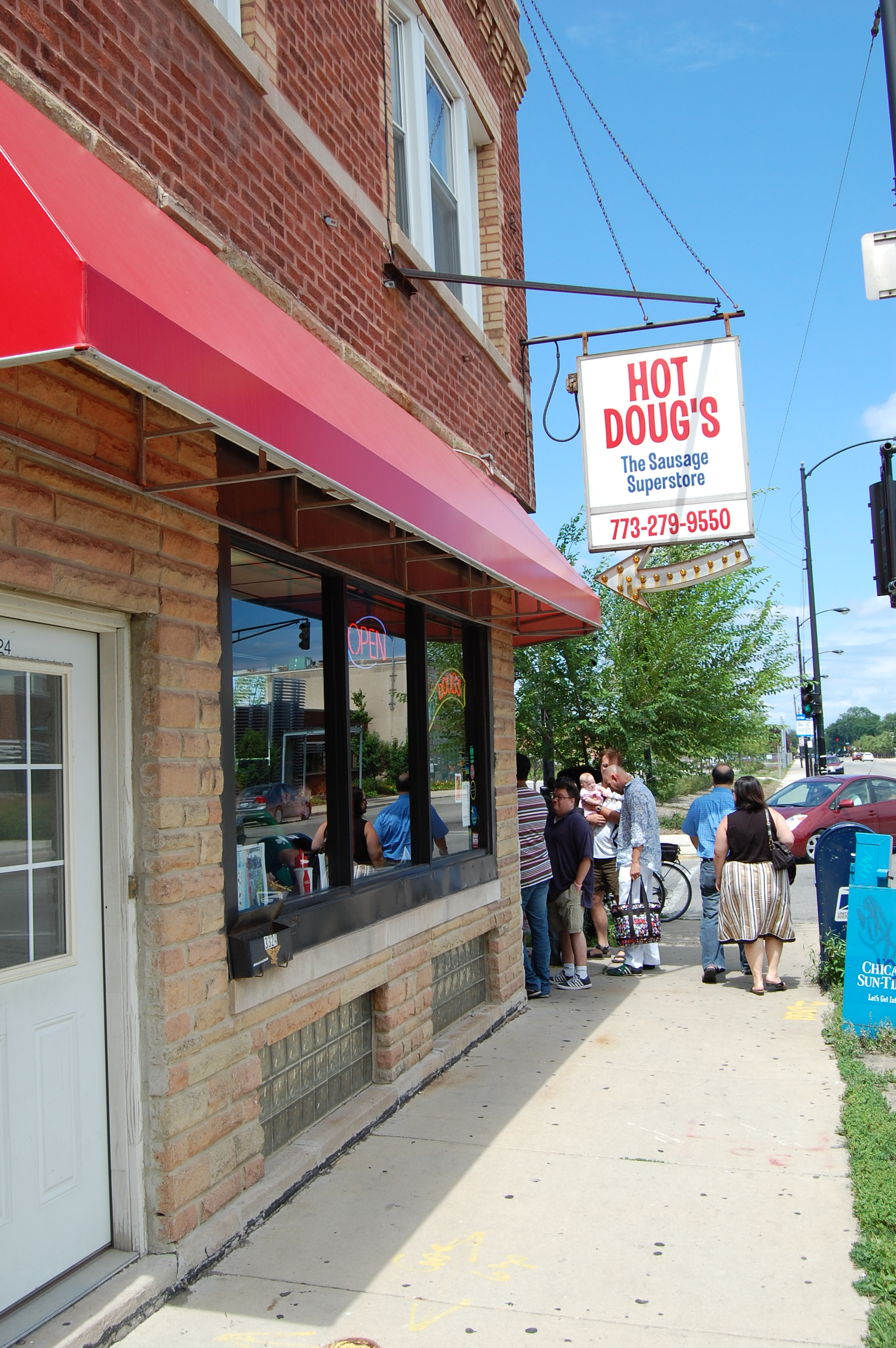
- Hot Doug's exterior
- Interactive map of Hot Doug's

Restaurant information
- Established: 2001
- Closed: October 3, 2014
- Previous owner: Doug Sohn
- Head chef: Doug Sohn
- Food type: Hot Dogs
- Dress code: Casual
- Location: 3324 N California Ave, Chicago, Cook, IL
- Coordinates: 41.94267°N 87.698136°W
- Seating capacity: 45
- Reservations: No
- Website: hotdougs.com

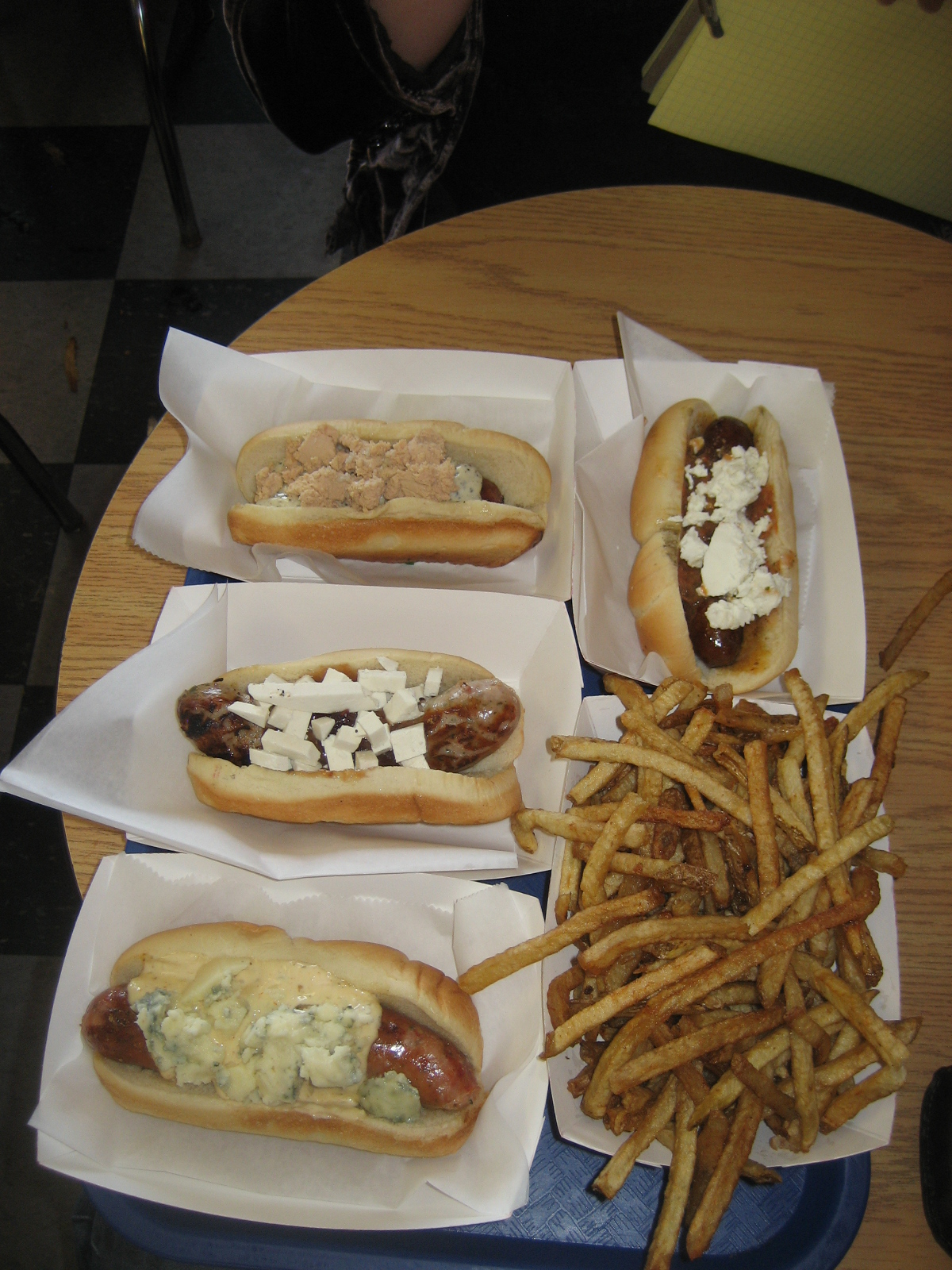
Hot Doug's food: Alligator, Snake, Foie Gras, Lamb Sausages and Duck Fat Fries

Hot Doug's was a Chicago, Illinois-based restaurant specializing in a variety of hot dogs and sausages. The self-proclaimed "Sausage Superstore and Encased Meat Emporium" was in its second location at 3324 North California Avenue in the city's Avondale neighborhood before it closed on October 3, 2014. Its first location, on Roscoe Street, closed after a 2004 fire. Hot Doug's was frequently featured in local and national media for its unique menu, and its purveyor and head chef, Doug Sohn, has been noted for his work to create affordable gourmet food. The restaurant was an extremely popular dining destination among both locals and tourists, and at lunch time and throughout much of the weekend customers could expect to wait in lines sometimes exceeding 4 hours just to get in the door.

The names attached to the permanent menu items were changed frequently but usually maintain a consistent theme: iconic Hollywood sex symbols, legendary comedians, famous Chicago Cubs baseball players, and so on. Hot Doug's was also notable for its duck fat fries, served on Fridays and Saturdays only, in which the potatoes are deep fried in rendered duck fat.

Hot Doug's is the subject of the 2016 documentary Hot Doug's: The Movie.

== Accolades ==
Hot Doug's won a 2006 Good Eating award from the Chicago Tribune, which noted the restaurant's "cult status" among hot dog aficionados. Hot Doug's has been featured as a Critics Pick on CBS, NBC, ABC, and the Travel Channel, and was featured in the Chicago episode of Anthony Bourdain: No Reservations. He has also been featured in The New York Times, USA Today, Bon Appetit, The Chicago Tribune, The Sun Times, Time Out Chicago and many other publications. Hot Doug's is highly rated by The Zagat Survey and is included in many of its Top Lists including Food Tops and Best Buys. Bon Appetit listed it as one of the 50 Best Restaurants on the Planet. The editors of Citysearch Chicago named Hot Doug's the 2006 Editorial Winner for Best Chicago Hot Dog. The restaurant also received a 2007 Best Hot Dog honors in a reader poll conducted by the magazine Time Out Chicago.

== Foie gras controversy ==
In 2006, Hot Doug's garnered media attention when it continued to serve various foie gras-based sausages and condiments following the banning of foie gras by the city of Chicago. The ban had been proposed by Alderman Joe Moore, inspired by Chicago chef Charlie Trotter's announcement that he had stopped serving foie gras on animal-cruelty grounds. Sohn flagrantly flouted the law by developing a "celebrity" dog made with foie gras, naming it after Moore and selling the "Joe Moore" during the ban. Sohn, the owner of Hot Doug's, was eventually fined $250 and 30 pounds of foie gras were confiscated from the restaurant. While Sohn may not have entered the argument to drum up sales, the restaurant did benefit from the controversy as it served as free publicity. Sohn was the first in the city to be fined, though a city spokesman stated that enforcement of the ordinance was "one of our lowest priorities". The ban was repealed in May 2008 and the foie gras items were brought back into the restaurant's rotating menu lineup. Hot Doug's specialty duck fat fries weren't affected by the ban.

== Closing ==
On May 6, 2014, Doug Sohn announced that he would be permanently closing Hot Doug's on Friday, October 3, 2014. Sohn decided to end operations as "it was time to do something else" and get out of the restaurant business. On the last day, the line was so long, additional customers were turned away at 6:30am, 4 hours before the restaurant was to open. A charity auction was planned to sell off some of the memorabilia from the restaurant.
