= The Fire This Time (anthology) =

2016 poetry and essay anthology edited by Jesmyn Ward

- First edition
- Editor: Jesmyn Ward
- Language: English
- Genre: Essays, poetry
- Publisher: Scribner
- Publication date: August 2, 2016
- Publication place: United States
- Pages: 288

The Fire This Time: A New Generation Speaks About Race is an essay and poetry collection edited by the American author Jesmyn Ward and published by Scribner in 2016. The title, The Fire This Time, alludes to James Baldwin's seminal 1963 text, The Fire Next Time.

== Publication history ==
The book was published by Scribner on August 2, 2016.

== Content ==
The Fire This Time is an anthology of 18 writers contributing essays and poetry to three movements entitled "Legacy", "Reckoning", and "Jubilee". The writers include, Carol Anderson, Rachel Kaadzi Ghansah, Jericho Brown, Edwidge Danticat, Kevin Young, Claudia Rankine, Garnette Cadogan, Mitchell S. Jackson, Kima Jones, Kiese Laymon, Daniel Jose Older, Emily Raboteau, Clint Smith, Isabel Wilkerson, Natasha Trethewey, Wendy S. Walters, and Honorée Jeffers.

In an interview with NPR, Ward shared that the urgency to put together such a book, specifically one which builds on the legacy of Baldwin's contributions to literature, was a newfound sense of change in the 2010s, specifically precipitated by police brutality in the United States:

I feel like there's a certain sense of mobilization now. People are not afraid to be activists, to be vocal. And I think back to my years in college and that wasn't the case. I was in college in the late '90s, early 2000s, and it didn't feel like now. It was muffled. It was definitely muffled. It didn't feel as sort of young people with sort of big ideas. Like it didn't feel like we had any sort of voice, or even a part in the conversation. And that's very different now. And I think it's a great thing. I think it's a wonderful thing. And it's part of what I wanted to tap into with the book.

Reviewing the collection for The New York Times, Jamil Smith described the anthology as, "deal[ing] with everything from the Charleston church shooting to OutKast’s influence to Rachel Dolezal’s chicanery, all through a black lens that is still too rare in literature and elsewhere. The pain of black life (and death) often inspires flowery verse, but every poem and essay in Ward’s volume remains grounded in a harsh reality that our nation, at large, refuses fully to confront. In the spirit of Baldwin’s centering of black experiences, they force everyone to see things our way."

== Reception ==
Writing for the San Francisco Chronicle, Imani Perry described Ward's collection as, "a composition made by someone who is as careful a reader as she is a writer. Ward is attuned to the spirit of this moment and she is its conductor, gifting insight to us all." Dwight Garner particularly praised contributions by Ward, Rachel Kaadzi Ghansah, Carol Anderson, Kevin Young, and Garnette Cadogan, saying their works are "[e]ach ... so alive with purpose, conviction and intellect that, upon finishing their contributions, you feel you must put this volume down and go walk around for a while."

Kirkus Reviews called it an "insightful" and "important collection" with "Timely contributions to an urgent national conversation." In a starred review, Publishers Weekly similarly stated that "Ward’s remarkable achievement is the gift of freshly minted perspectives on a tale that may seem old and twice-told. Readers in search of conversations about race in America should start here."

Dwight Garner, for The New York Times called it a "powerful book". Jamil Smith, also writing for The New York Times, said, of the book and its namesake derived from Baldwin, "It seeks not to repeatedly dig up Baldwin’s legacy, but to provide a model for contextualizing and building upon it so that, perhaps, the man can finally rest in peace. This volume has found a new generation to carry the weight".
