= The Fire Next Time =

1963 non-fiction book by James Baldwin

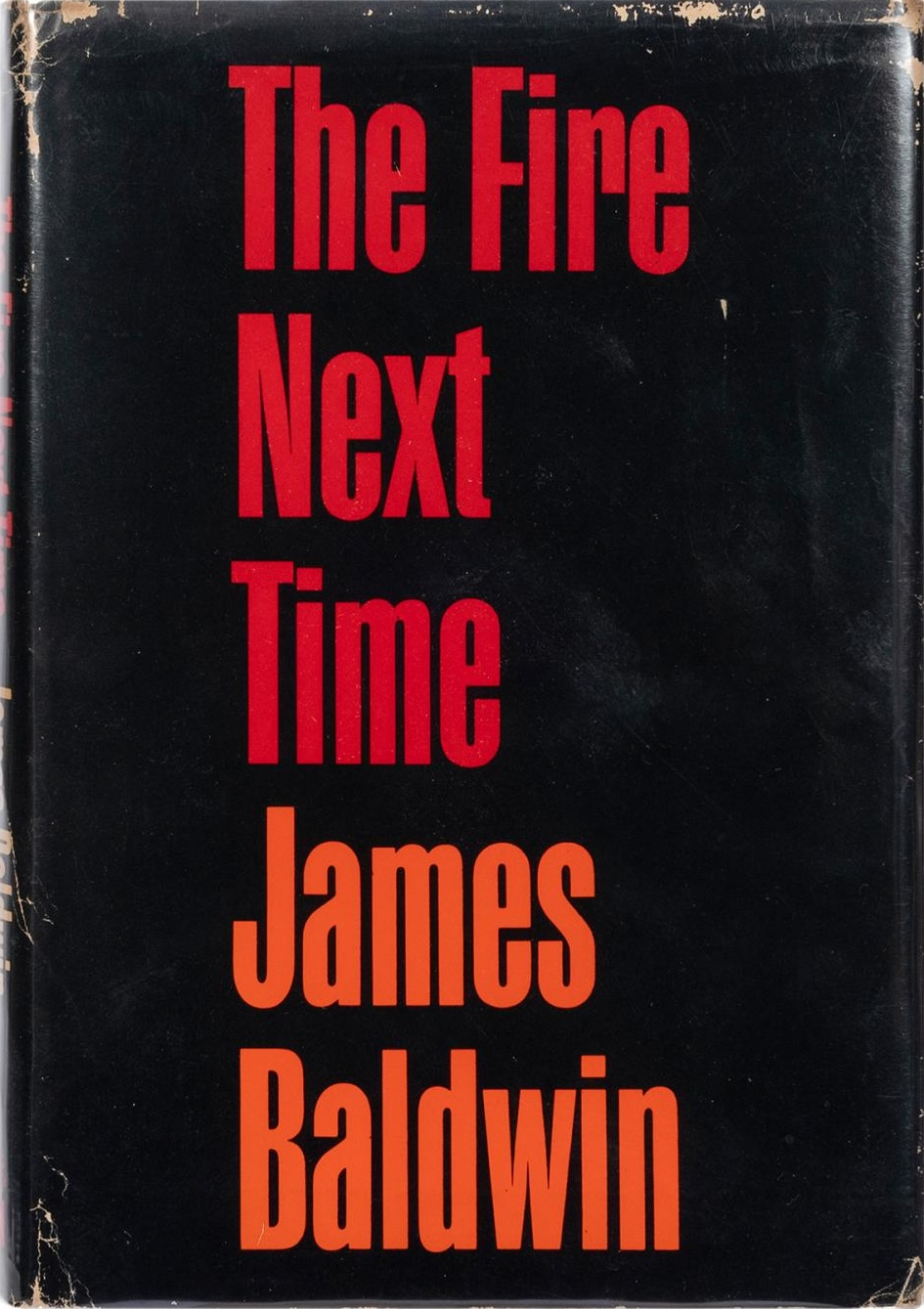
- First edition cover
- Author: James Baldwin
- Language: English
- Genre: Essays
- Publisher: Dial Press
- Publication date: 1963
- Publication place: United States
- Media type: Hardcover
- Pages: 128
- ISBN: 0-679-74472-X (Vintage Books, 1994)

The Fire Next Time is a 1963 non-fiction book by James Baldwin, containing two essays: "My Dungeon Shook: Letter to my Nephew on the One Hundredth Anniversary of the Emancipation" and "Down at the Cross: Letter from a Region of My Mind".

The first essay, written in the form of a letter to Baldwin's 14-year-old nephew, discusses the central role of race in American history. The second essay, which takes up the majority of the book, deals with the relations between race and religion, focusing in particular on Baldwin's experiences with the Christian church as a youth, as well as the Nation of Islam's ideals and influence in Harlem.

The two essays were first published separately in American magazines in late 1962: "Letter from a Region in My Mind" in The New Yorker, and "My Dungeon Shook" in The Progressive. They were combined and published in book form in 1963 by The Dial Press, and in 1964 in Britain by Penguin Books. The book was enthusiastically received by critics, and is considered one of the most influential books about race relations in the 1960s. It was released as an audiobook in 2008, narrated by Jesse L. Martin.

== Title ==
The book's title comes from a couplet in an African-American spiritual entitled "Got a Home in That Rock" or "God Gave Noah the Rainbow Sign":

God gave Noah the rainbow sign
No more water, the fire next time

This couplet is sometimes erroneously referred to as being from a different spiritual, "Mary Don't You Weep". but this lyric appears to be a later interpolation popularized by Pete Seeger.

The first line is based on Genesis 9:8–17, where God shows Noah a rainbow as the sign of his covenant to not destroy the world again by flooding. The second line is based on 2 Peter 3:6–7: after being destroyed by water once, the world is preserved for the fire of the day of judgement. Fire is also used for the day of judgement in prophetic texts, as in Malachi 4 and the lake of fire in Revelation 20.

== Content ==
The two essays were written in the 1960s during a time of segregation between White and Black Americans. In his essays, Baldwin's purpose was to reach a mass white audience and help them to better understand Black Americans' struggle for equal rights. Looking at the time period in which Baldwin's essays were published shows how purposefully each essay was constructed. At the time, the Civil Rights Movement was beginning to recognize the need for publicity, in particular "story-telling that would generate public support for the movement's people and goals". This was the context in which Baldwin's essays were first published.

What made Baldwin's essays effective is that they were testimonial. Giving testimonial evidence about how racism in America has operated in real people's lives is an effective strategy for connecting with an audience that is otherwise unaware. The book met both the need of the Civil Rights Movement for publicity and an unspoken need of white audiences who did not understand the movement or the lives of the people involved. Although many of the ideas that Baldwin writes about in his essays were not novel to black intellectualism, the way in which they were presented to their audience was. Baldwin's writings profoundly "provoked and challenged the dominant white American frame for understanding race relations" during the time that they were first published.

=== "My Dungeon Shook" ===
The first essay, originally appearing in The Progressive magazine in 1962 and titled "My Dungeon Shook: Letter to My Nephew on the One Hundredth Anniversary of the Emancipation", is a letter to Baldwin's nephew in which he compares his nephew to the men in their family including Baldwin's brother and father. He tells his nephew about America's ability to destroy Black men and challenges his nephew to convert his anger due to mistreatment as a Black man into having a passionate and broad outlook on the African-American experience.

=== "Down at the Cross: Letter from a Region in my Mind" ===
The second essay originally appeared in The New Yorker (1962) under the title "Letter from a Region in My Mind".

Titled in the book as "Down at the Cross: Letter from a Region in my Mind", the essay addresses the detriment of Christianity on the Black community and Baldwin's journey from being a teen pastor to completely pulling away from the church because it felt like a repression of his full experience of humanity. He then recounts his dinner with Elijah Muhammad where Muhammad educated Baldwin on the Nation of Islam in the hope of getting him to join the movement. In this section Baldwin describes how Black Muslims have made a "black god" to avoid the oppression of a "white god" that Christianity has established within the Black community.

== Responses ==
Jacquelyn Dowd Hall wrote an article that focused on the civil rights movement, led by Martin Luther King Jr., building on Baldwin's work. Baldwin's piece examined the issue of racism mainly in his area of Harlem, New York, and Hall emphasized that the racial issue they confronted in America was not a sectional but a national problem.

Another article that expands on Baldwin's new religious view was written by Jon Nilson, a theology professor. In The Fire Next Time, Baldwin focused on how Christianity was corrupted. Observing that Baldwin challenged the Catholic Church, Nilson said that the April 1968 assassination of Martin Luther King Jr. had almost seemed like The Fire Next Time had come true.

In December 2016, Can I Get a Witness? The Gospel of James Baldwin, a 2016 musical theatrical tribute to Baldwin by the musician Meshell Ndegeocello and based on The Fire Next Time was premiered at the Harlem Stage in Harlem.

In July 2015, Ta-Nehisi Coates wrote an article in The Atlantic as an updated version of Baldwin's letter to his nephew called "Letter to My Son", and later published an entire book called Between the World and Me that talks about the modern Black experience in America.

The title was alluded to in Max Hastings' book America, 1968: The Fire This Time.

It was also alluded to in the 2016 anthology The Fire This Time: A New Generation Speaks About Race, edited by Jesmyn Ward.

== Controversy ==
According to Pen America, The Fire Next Time has been banned or removed from libraries in Clay County, Florida school districts since 2022.

== See also ==
- James Baldwin: A Soul on Fire
- The New Jim Crow
- Between the World and Me
- Timeline of the civil rights movement
