= Rachel Kaadzi Ghansah =

American essayist

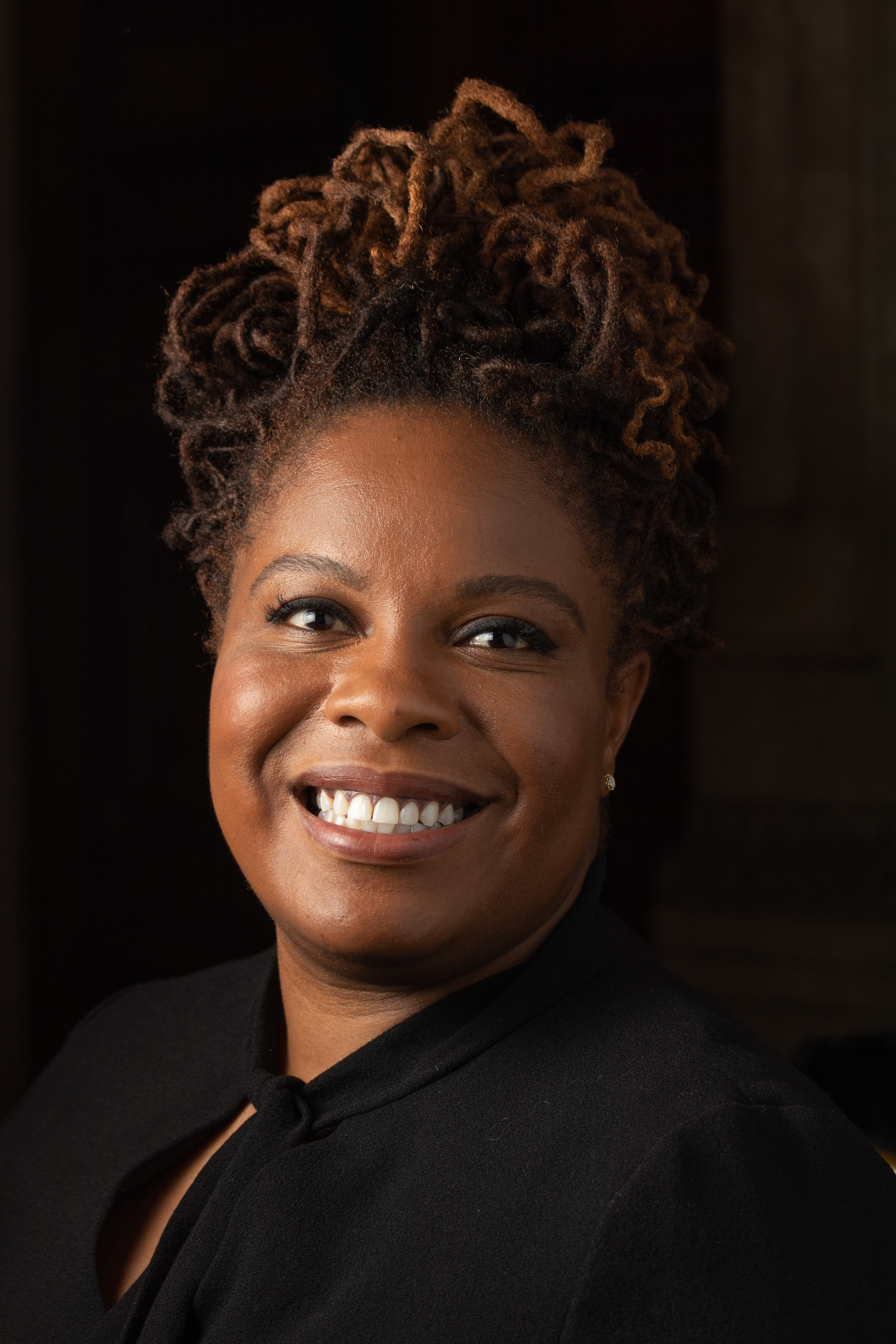
- Ghansah at the 2018 Pulitzer Prizes
- Born: 1982 (age 43–44)
- Education: Columbia University
- Occupation: Essayist
- Website: The Uncollected Works of RKG

Rachel Kaadzi Ghansah (born 1982) is an American essayist. She won a Pulitzer Prize for Feature Writing in 2018 for her profile of white supremacist and mass murderer Dylann Roof, as well as a National Magazine Award. She was also a National Magazine Award finalist in 2014 for her profile of elusive comedian Dave Chappelle. Her first book, The Explainers and the Explorers, is forthcoming from Random House.

== Early life ==
Ghansah spent her early childhood in Indiana and then moved to Philadelphia for elementary school. She attended Greene Street Friends School. Her mother's family is from Louisiana—Ghansah's maternal grandmother moved from Louisiana to live with them in Philadelphia while Ghansah was growing up—while her father is Ghanaian, from the Fanti and Ga family, although his mother moved to London in the 1920s. Ghansah’s mother is a professor.

== Career ==
=== Early career and education ===
Early in her career, Ghansah worked for Rich Nichols and The Roots as well as dream hampton; Tariq Trotter (Black Thought) was an early mentor in her writing career, giving her practical advice while still a teenager about getting a thesaurus and building a vocabulary. She credits her time working with rappers for teaching her cadence. She then became a public school teacher, but eventually returned to writing, becoming the first African-American intern at Harper's Magazine. She graduated from Columbia University's MFA program in writing in 2011, and has taught at Columbia University, Harvard University, Yale University, Bard College, and Eugene Lang College.

=== Journalism ===
Ghansah has drawn particular recognition for her longform profiles of subjects such as Kendrick Lamar (in the Los Angeles Review of Books), Missy Elliott, Jean-Michel Basquiat, Chirlane McCray, and Toni Morrison—which Flavorwire recommended as "necessary, even recuperative"—as well as essays on Beyoncé's fans, Jimi Hendrix's Electric Lady Studios, and James Baldwin's historic home in southern France.

Her Baldwin essay was anthologized in The Best American Essays series for 2017 as well as the 2016 Baldwin-inspired collection, The Fire This Time; in The New York Times, Dwight Garner described Ghansah's contribution as "alive with purpose, conviction, and intellect" and one of the "five excellent reasons to buy this book." In a review of that same collection for New York Review of Books, Darryl Pinckney, wrote that, "Baldwin didn't want to be [Richard] Wright's heir, any more than Rachel Kaadzi Ghansah wanted to be Baldwin's."

Her writing has earned praise from The Atlantic, The New Yorker, and Brooklyn Magazine whose editors wrote that "if we wanted to compile a reading list of the best journalism in the last couple of years, we'd begin with basically all the work of Rachel Kaadzi Ghansah." KQED has called Ghansah "one of the most brilliant essayists writing in America today." Longreads described her as being "an unparalleled architect of the profile. She can strike an ideal balance between scene and exposition, lyricism and plot. She can bring a subject to life with fresh insight, and keep herself in the narrative in a way that is unobtrusive and necessary." And in a 2016 Elle UK feature, "Zadie Smith On The Young Writer Who Teaches Her Everything," novelist Smith said Ghansah "always understood that to make your writing stand out online you just need to write better than everyone else. And she does."

In 2014, Ghansah's profile in The Believer of elusive comedian Dave Chappelle was a National Magazine Award finalist and collected in 2014 edition of The Best American Nonrequired Reading as well as The Believer's anthology Read Harder (2014). Writing in the New York Times, Evan Hughes reviewed her essay's appearance in that collection as "more forceful work ... [a] searching profile." New York called her Chappelle essay a "classic." The critic Stephanie Fields later wrote that, those early "profiles established not only her nuanced style of long form writing with extensive bibliographies, but a context for black art and black life. A consistent theme of Ghansah's work is how black artists have shaped their own narratives through an exertion of autonomy not usually afforded to black people. She then weaves those threads of resistance into the larger tapestry of black history."

For the MoMA, in 2018, Ghansah curated a PopRally event entitled "Woman's Work" a celebration of black womanhood and black female genius that featured the work of Julie Dash, Kandis Williams, and dream hampton, music from Helado Negro, readings from Greg Tate, Saeed Jones, Darryl Pinckney, and a performance from Steffani Jemison and Sharifa Rhodes-Pitts as FORT.

In 2019, Ghansah was a recipient of the American Mosaic Journalism Prize, a $100,000 award from the Heising-Simons Foundation for her "deeply reported and essayistic writing pushes the form of longform journalism, ranging from a poignant profile of master painter Henry Taylor to a searing exposé of the hotbed of racism and white supremacy that fueled the heinous murder of nine African-Americans in Charleston, South Carolina. Her power of observation and nuanced writing both shines light on Black Americans and dares us to look at the forces that shape race in America."

==== Pulitzer Prize ====
In the fall of 2016, Ghansah spent three months in Charleston, South Carolina, covering the federal trial of Dylann Roof for GQ. Her reporting on the making of Dylann Roof and the rise of white nationalist violence was described by the Columbia Journalism Review to be "deserving of all the praise it is getting" and a demonstration of "what apex reporting on the white supremacy beat would look like". In The Guardian, Jessica Valenti praised the essay for being "an incredible piece of reporting". Kevin Sack, writing in The New York Times, called the piece "expansive and intimate", saying "Ghansah guides us through what is known of the life this young man who remains 'safeguarded by his knowledge that white American terrorism is never waterboarded for answers.'"

In 2018, this piece and her profile of Missy Elliott were both selected as finalists for the National Magazine Awards, with the GQ story winning the award for best feature. The GQ story won the 2018 Pulitzer Prize for Feature Writing. "For an unforgettable portrait of murderer Dylann Roof, using a unique and powerful mix of reportage, first-person reflection and analysis of the historical and cultural forces behind his killing of nine people inside Emanuel AME Church in Charleston, S.C." However, Adam Lankford, a criminology and criminal justice professor at the University of Alabama who researches mass shootings, said he respects Ghansah and her skillful work, since in-depth investigations like this story can help academics find patterns and make antidotes to America's mass shooting epidemic, but he also wishes Ghansah knew how dangerous it is to publish mass shooters' names and photos.

=== The Explainers and the Explorers ===
Ghansah is at work on her first book, The Explainers and the Explorers. Examining "how black America will define itself in the 21st century", the two-volume series will be published in the U.S. by Random House.

== Selected works ==
- "He Shall Overcome: Jay-Z Is $450M Beyond The Marcy Projects. Where Does He Go From Here?", Observer, 2010.
- "If He Hollers Let Him Go: Searching for Dave Chappelle ten years after he left his own show", The Believer, 2013. Anthologized in The Best American Nonrequired Reading (2014) and Read Harder (2014).
- "When the Lights Shut Off: Kendrick Lamar and the Decline of the Black Blues Narrative", Los Angeles Review of Books, 2013.
- "How Sweet It Is To Be Loved By You: The BeyHive", NPR, 2014.
- "Chirlane McCray and the Limits of First-Ladyship", The New York Times Magazine, 2016.
- "A River Runs Through It: A Biography of Jimi Hendrix's Electric Lady Studios, Its Ownership, and Other Black Memories", The Believer, 2015.
- "The Radical Vision of Toni Morrison", The New York Times Magazine, 2015.
- "The Weight of James Arthur Baldwin", Buzzfeed, 2016. Anthologized in The Fire This Time: A New Generation Speaks About Race (2016) and The Best American Essays (2017).
- "Her Eyes Were Watching the Stars", Elle, 2017.
- "A Most American Terrorist: The Making of Dylann Roof", GQ, 2017.
- "Henry Taylor’s Wild Heart Can’t Be Broken", Vulture, 2018.
