= National Book Foundation's 5 Under 35 =

Annual American literary prize

The National Book Foundation's 5 Under 35 prize, established in 2006, is an annual honor presented by the National Book Foundation to five authors under the age of 35 who released their debut novel in the previous five years. Honorees are nominated by authors who were previously honored with a National Book Award or 5 Under 35 nomination. Honorees receive a $1,250 prize.

== Honorees ==
5 Under 35 honorees
Year	Honoree	Work	Nominator	Ref.
2006	Amity Gaige	O My Darling (Other Press)	Christopher Sorrentino	
2006	Samantha Hunt	The Seas Picador (Picador)	René Steinke	
2006	Bret Anthony Johnston	Corpus Christi: Stories (Random House)	Adam Haslett	
2006	Rattawut Lapcharoensap	Sightseeing (Grove Atlantic)	Joan Silber	
2006	ZZ Packer	Drinking Coffee Elsewhere (Riverhead Books, 2003)	Edward P. Jones	
2007	Kirstin Allio	Garner (Coffee House Press, 2005)	Dana Spiotta	
2007	Dinaw Mengestu	The Beautiful Things That Heaven Bears (Riverhead Books, 2007)	Jess Walter	
2007	Asali Solomon	Get Down: Stories (Farrar, Straus and Giroux, 2006)	Jennifer Egan	
2007	Anya Ulinich	Petropolis (Viking Press, 2007)	Ken Kalfus	
2007	Charles Yu	Third Class Superhero (Harcourt, 2006)		
2008	Matthew Eck	The Farther Shore (Milkweed Editions)	Joshua Ferris	
2008	Keith Gessen	All the Sad Young Literary Men (Viking Press, 2008)	Jonathan Franzen	
2008	Sana Krasikov	One More Year: Stories (Spiegel & Grau)	Francine Prose	
2008	Nam Le	The Boat (Knopf)	Mary Gaitskill	
2008	Fiona Maazel	Last Last Chance (FSG)	Jim Shepard	
2009	Ceridwen Dovey	Blood Kin (Viking)	Rachel Kushner	
2009	C. E. Morgan	All the Living (FSG)	Christine Schutt	
2009	Lydia Peelle	Reasons for and Advantages of Breathing (HarperCollins)	Salvatore Scibona	
2009	Karen Russell	St. Lucy's Home for Girls Raised by Wolves (Vintage)	Dan Chaon	
2009	Josh Weil	The New Valley (Grove Press)	Lily Tuck	
2010	Sarah Braunstein	The Sweet Relief of Missing Children (Norton, 2011)	Sarah Shun-lien Bynum	
2010	Grace Krilanovich	The Orange Eats Creeps (Two Dollar Radio, 2010)	Scott Spencer	
2010	Téa Obreht	The Tiger’s Wife (Random House, 2011)	Colum McCann	
2010	Tiphanie Yanique	How to Escape from a Leper Colony (Graywolf, 2010)	Jayne Anne Phillips	
2010	Paul Yoon	Once the Shore (Sarabande, 2009)	Kate Walbert	
2011	Shani Boianjiu	The People of Forever Are Not Afraid (Hogarth, 2013)	Nicole Krauss	
2011	Danielle Evans	Before You Suffocate Your Own Fool Self (Riverhead, 2010)	Robert Stone	
2011	Mary Beth Keane	The Walking People (Mariner, 2009)	Julia Glass	
2011	Melinda Moustakis	Bear Down, Bear North: Alaska Stories (University of Georgia Press, 2011)	Jaimy Gordon	
2011	John Corey Whaley	Where Things Come Back (Atheneum Books, 2011)	Oscar Hijuelos	
2012	Jennifer duBois	A Partial History of Lost Causes (Dial Press, 2012)	Jennifer duBois	
2012	Stuart Nadler	The Book of Life (Reagan Arthur, 2011)	Edith Pearlman	
2012	Haley Tanner	Vaclav & Lena (Dial Press, 2012)	Téa Obreht	
2012	Justin Torres	We the Animals (Houghton Mifflin Harcourt, 2011)	Jessica Hagedorn	
2012	Claire Vaye Watkins	Battleborn (Riverhead, 2012)	Julie Otsuka	
2013	Molly Antopol	The UnAmericans (Norton, 2014)	Jesmyn Ward	
2013	NoViolet Bulawayo	We Need New Names (Reagan Arthur, 2013)	Junot Díaz	
2013	Amanda Coplin	The Orchardist (Harper, 2012)	Louise Erdrich	
2013	Daisy Hildyard	Hunters in the Snow (Jonathan Cape, 2013)	Kevin Powers	
2013	Merritt Tierce	Love Me Back (Doubleday, 2014)	Ben Fountain	
2014	Yelena Akhtiorskaya	Panic in a Suitcase (Riverhead, 2014)	Aleksandar Hemon	
2014	Alex Gilvarry	From the Memoirs of a Non-Enemy Combatant (Viking, 2012)	Amy Bloom	
2014	Phil Klay	Redeployment (Penguin, 2014)	Andrea Barrett	
2014	Valeria Luiselli	Faces in the Crowd (Coffee House, 2014)	Karen Tei Yamashita	
2014	Kirstin Valdez Quade	Night at the Fiestas (Norton, 2015)	Andre Dubus III	
2015	Colin Barrett	Young Skins (Black Cat, 2015)	Paul Yoon	
2015	Angela Flournoy	The Turner House (Houghton Mifflin Harcourt, 2015)	ZZ Packer	
2015	Megan Kruse	Call Me Home (Hawthorne Books, 2015)	Phil Klay	
2015	Tracy O’Neill	The Hopeful (Ig Publishing, 2015)	Fiona Maazel	
2015	Azareen Van der Vliet Oloomi	Fra Keeler (Dorothy, 2012)	Dinaw Mengestu	
2016	Brit Bennett	The Mothers (Riverhead, 2016)	Jacqueline Woodson	
2016	Yaa Gyasi	Homegoing (Knopf, 2016)	Ta-Nehisi Coates	
2016	Greg Jackson	Prodigals (FSG)	Lauren Groff	
2016	S. Li	Transoceanic Lights (Harvard Square Editions)	Karen Bender	
2016	Thomas Pierce	Hall of Small Mammals (Riverhead)	Amity Gaige	
2017	Lesley Nneka Arimah	What It Means When a Man Falls from the Sky: Stories (Riverhead)	Chris Bachelder	
2017	Halle Butler	Jillian (Curbside Splendor)	Lydia Millet	
2017	Zinzi Clemmons	What We Lose (Viking, 2017)	Angela Flournoy	
2017	Leopoldine Core	When Watched: Stories (Penguin)	Karan Mahajan	
2017	Weike Wang	Chemistry (Knopf, 2017)	Sherman Alexie	
2018	Nana Kwame Adjei-Brenyah	Friday Black (Mariner, 2018)	Colson Whitehead	
2018	Hannah Lillith Assadi	Sonora (Soho Press)	Claire Vaye Watkins	
2018	Akwaeke Emezi	Freshwater (Grove Atlantic, 2018)	Carmen Maria Machado	
2018	Lydia Kiesling	The Golden State (MCD Books)	Samantha Hunt	
2018	Moriel Rothman-Zecher	Sadness Is a White Bird (Atria)	Bill Clegg	
2019	Anelise Chen	So Many Olympic Exertions (Kaya Press)	Dana Spiotta	
2019	Isabella Hammad	The Parisian (Grove Press)	Viet Thanh Nguyen	
2019	Johannes Lichtman	Such Good Work (S&S)	Garth Greenwell	
2019	Bryan Washington	Lot: Stories (Riverhead Books)	Nafissa Thompson-Spires	
2019	Ashley Wurzbacher	Happy Like This (University of Iowa Press)	Brandon Hobson	
2020	K-Ming Chang	Bestiary (One World)	Justin Torres	
2020	Naima Coster	Halsey Street (Little A)	Tayari Jones	
2020	Raven Leilani	Luster (FSG, 2020)	Susan Choi	
2020	Fatima Farheen Mirza	A Place for Us (SJP for Hogarth, 2018)	Tommy Orange	
2020	C Pam Zhang	How Much of These Hills Is Gold (Riverhead Books, 2020)	Marlon James	
2021	Caleb Azumah Nelson	Open Water (Black Cat, 2021)	Brit Bennett	
2021	Nathan Harris	The Sweetness of Water (Little, Brown and Company, 2021)	Charmaine Craig	
2021	Lee Lai	Stone Fruit (Fantagraphics, 2021)	Bryan Washington	
2021	Claire Luchette	Agatha of Little Neon (Farrar, Straus and Giroux, 2021)	Elizabeth McCracken	
2021	Dantiel W. Moniz	Milk Blood Heat (Grove)	Rumaan Alam	
2022	Alexandra Chang	Days of Distraction (Ecco)	Jason Mott	
2022	Joseph Han	Nuclear Family (Counterpoint Press)	Azareen Van der Vliet Oloomi	
2022	Crystal Hana Kim	If You Leave Me (William Morrow)	Min Jin Lee	
2022	Clare Sestanovich	Objects of Desire: Stories (Knopf)	Anthony Doerr	
2022	Alyssa Songsiridej	Little Rabbit (Bloomsbury)	Julia Phillips	
2023	Mateo Askaripour	Black Buck (Mariner Books)	Robert Jones Jr.	
2023	Chelsea T. Hicks	A Calm & Normal Heart (Unnamed Press)	Louise Erdrich	
2023	Morgan Talty	Night of the Living Rez (Tin House Books)	Karen Russell	
2023	Jenny Xie	Holding Pattern (Riverhead Books, 2023)	Kirstin Valdez Quade	
2023	Ada Zhang	The Sorrows of Others (A Public Space)	Jamil Jan Kochai	
2024	Antonia Angress	Sirens & Muses (Ballantine Books)	Charles Baxter	
2024	Maya Binyam	Hangman (Farrar, Straus and Giroux, 2023)	Alejandro Varela	
2024	Zain Khalid	Brother Alive (Grove Press, 2022)	Laila Lalami	
2024	Tyriek White	We Are a Haunting (Astra House)	Tiphanie Yanique	
2024	Jenny Tinghui Zhang	Four Treasures of the Sky (Flatiron Books)	Adam Johnson	
2025	Stacie Shannon Denetsosie	The Missing Morningstar and Other Stories (Torrey House Press)	Mona Susan Power	
2025	Megan Howell	Softie (West Virginia University Press)	Deesha Philyaw	
2025	Maggie Millner	Couplets: A Love Story (Farrar, Straus and Giroux)	C Pam Zhang	
2025	Alexander Sammartino	Last Acts (Scribner)	George Saunders	
2025	Jemimah Wei	The Original Daughter (Doubleday)	Morgan Talty	
2026	Megan Kamalei Kakimoto	Every Drop Is a Man’s Nightmare (Bloomsbury Publishing)	Kali Fajardo-Anstine	
2026	Anika Jade Levy	Flat Earth (Catapult)	Sigrid Nunez	
2026	Carrie R. Moore	Make Your Way Home: Stories (Tin House Books)	Danielle Evans	
2026	Maggie Su	Blob: A Love Story (Harper Collins)	Charles Yu	
2026	Stephanie Wambugu	Lonely Crowds (Hachette Book Group)	Kaveh Akbar	
