= The Best American Short Stories 2022 =

2022 short story collection

- Editor: Andrew Sean Greer and Heidi Pitlor
- Language: English
- Series: The Best American Short Stories
- Published: 2022
- Publisher: Mariner Books
- Media type: Print (hardback & paperback)
- ISBN: 9780358724407 (hardback)
- Preceded by: The Best American Short Stories 2021
- Followed by: The Best American Short Stories 2023

The Best American Short Stories 2022 is a volume in the annual Best American Short Stories anthology. It was edited by series editor Heidi Pitlor and guest editor and Pulitzer Prize winner Andrew Sean Greer. The collection of 20 short stories selected from leading magazines in the U.S. was published in November 2022 with a print run of 75,000. It was also issued as an audiobook spoken by five voice actors.

== Short stories included ==
Author	Title	First published
Leslie Blanco	"A Ravishing Sun"	New Letters (Vol.87, No. 1-2)
Yohanca Delgado	"The Little Widow from the Capital"	The Paris Review (No. 236)
Kim Coleman Foote	"Man of the House"	Ecotone (Vol.16, no. 2)
Lauren Groff	"The Wind"	The New Yorker (January 25, 2021)
Greg Jackson	"The Hollow"	The New Yorker (November 22, 2021)
Gish Jen	"Detective Dog"	The New Yorker (November 15, 2021)
Claire Luchette	"Sugar Island"	Ploughshares (Spring 2021)
Elizabeth McCracken	"The Souvenir Museum"	Harper's Magazine (January 2021)
Alice McDermott	"Post"	One Story (Issue 280, August 26, 2021)
Kevin Moffett	"Bears Among the Living"	McSweeney's (Issue 63)
Gina Ochsner	"Soon the Light"	Ploughshares (Winter 2020–21)
Okwiri Oduor	"Mbiu Dash"	Granta (Issue 156, July 29, 2021)
Alix Ohlin	"The Meeting"	Virginia Quarterly Review (Spring 2021)
Kenan Orhan	"The Beyoğlu Municipality Waste Management Orchestra"	The Paris Review (Issue 237, Summer 2021)
Karen Russell	"The Ghost Birds"	The New Yorker (October 4, 2021)
Sanjena Sathian	"Mr. Ashok's Monument"	Conjunctions (Issue 76, Spring 2021)
Erin Somers	"Ten Year Affair"	Joyland (February 1, 2021)
Héctor Tobar	"The Sins of Others"	Zyzzyva (Issue 120)
Louise Wagner	"Elephant Seals"	AGNI (Issue 93, April 15, 2021)
Bryan Washington	"Foster"	The New Yorker (June 7, 2021)
