= The Best American Short Stories 2024 =

2024 short story collection

- Editor: Lauren Groff and Heidi Pitlor
- Language: English
- Series: The Best American Short Stories
- Published: 2024
- Publisher: Mariner Books
- Media type: Print (hardback & paperback)
- ISBN: 9780063275959 (hardback)
- Preceded by: The Best American Short Stories 2023
- Followed by: The Best American Short Stories 2025

The Best American Short Stories 2024 is a volume in the annual Best American Short Stories anthology. It was edited by the series editor, Heidi Pitlor, and guest editor Lauren Groff. The collection was published in October 2024 with a print run of 75,000 copies.

== Short stories included ==
Author	Title	First published
Shastri Akella	"The Magic Bangle"	Fairy Tale Review
Selena Gambrell Anderson	"Jewel of the Gulf of Mexico"	McSweeney's
Marie-Helene Bertino	"Viola in Midwinter"	Bennington Review
Jamel Brinkley	"Blessed Deliverance"	Zoetrope: All-Story
Alexandra Chang	"Phenotype"	Electric Literature
Laurie Colwin	"Evensong"	The New Yorker
Katherine Damm	"The Happiest Day of Your Life"	The Iowa Review
Molly Dektar	"The Bed & Breakfast"	The Harvard Review
Steven Duong	"Dorchester"	The Drift
Madeline ffitch	"Seeing Through Maps"	Harper's Magazine
Allegra Hyde	"Democracy in America"	The Massachusetts Review
Taisia Kitaiskaia	"Engelond"	Virginia Quarterly Review
Jhumpa Lahiri	"P's Parties"	The New Yorker
Daniel Mason	"A Case Study"	The Paris Review
Lori Ostlund	"Just Another Family"	New England Review
Jim Shepard	"Privilege"	Ploughshares
Susan Shepherd	"Baboons"	The Kenyon Review
Azareen Van der Vliet Oloomi	"Extinction"	Electric Literature
Suzanne Wang	"Mall of America"	One Story
Paul Yoon	"Valley of the Moon"	The New Yorker
