= The Best American Short Stories 2023 =

2023 short story collection

- Editor: Min Jin Lee and Heidi Pitlor
- Language: English
- Series: The Best American Short Stories
- Published: 2023
- Publisher: Mariner Books
- Media type: Print (hardback & paperback)
- ISBN: 9780063275911 (hardback)
- Preceded by: The Best American Short Stories 2022
- Followed by: The Best American Short Stories 2024

The Best American Short Stories 2023 is a volume in the annual Best American Short Stories anthology. It was edited by the series editor, Heidi Pitlor, and guest editor and National Book Award finalist, Min Jin Lee.

== Short stories included ==
Author	Title	First published
Cherline Bazile	"Tender"	The Sewanee Review
Maya Binyam	"Do You Belong to Anybody?"	The Paris Review
Tom Bissell	"His Finest Moment"	Zyzzyva
Taryn Bowe	"Camp Emeline"	Indiana Review
Da-Lin	"Treasure Island Alley"	New England Review
Benjamin Ehrlich	"The Master Mourner"	The Gettysburg Review
Sara Freeman	"The Company of Others"	The Sewanee Review
Lauren Groff	"Annunciation"	The New Yorker
Nathan Harris	"The Mine"	Electric Literature
Jared Jackson	"Bebo"	The Kenyon Review
Sana Krasikov	"The Muddle"	The New Yorker
Danica Li	"My Brother William"	The Iowa Review
Ling Ma	"Peking Duck"	The New Yorker
Manuel Muñoz	"Compromisos"	Electric Literature
Joanna Pearson	"Grand Mal"	The Kenyon Review
Souvankham Thammavongsa	"Trash"	The New Yorker
Kosiso Ugwueze	"Supernova"	New England Review
Corinna Vallianatos	"This Isn't the Actual Sea"	Idaho Review
Azareen Van der Vliet Oloomi	"It Is What It Is"	Electric Literature
Esther Yi	"Moon"	The Paris Review
