= Kakimoto =

Kakimoto (written: 柿本) is a Japanese surname. Notable people with the surname include:

- Megan Kamalei Kakimoto (born 1993), Japanese/Native Hawaiian writer.
- Fuka Kakimoto (柿本 風香, born 1984), Japanese professional wrestler, mixed martial artist and model.
- Michiaki Kakimoto (柿本 倫明, born 1977), Japanese footballer.
