= Ecotone (disambiguation) =

Ecotone may refer to:

- Ecotone, transition area between two adjacent ecological communities (ecosystems)
- Ecotone (company), (formerly Royal Wessanen). A French multinational food company
- Ecotone (Six Feet Under episode), the title of Episode 60 of Six Feet Under
- Ecotone (magazine), a literary magazine published by the University of North Carolina Wilmington
