= The Best American Short Stories 2019 =

2019 short story collection

- Editor: Anthony Doerr and Heidi Pitlor
- Language: English
- Series: The Best American Short Stories
- Published: 2019
- Publisher: Houghton Mifflin Harcourt
- Media type: Print (hardcover & paperback)
- ISBN: 9781328465825 (hardcover)
- Preceded by: The Best American Short Stories 2018
- Followed by: The Best American Short Stories 2020

The Best American Short Stories 2019 is a volume in the annual The Best American Short Stories anthology series. It was edited by the series editor, Heidi Pitlor, and guest editor and Pulitzer Prize for Fiction winner Anthony Doerr.

== Short stories included ==
Author	Title	First published
Nana Kwame Adjei-Brenyah	"The Era"	Guernica (April 2, 2018)
Kathleen Alcott	"Natural Light"	Zoetrope: All-Story (vol.22, no.1)
Wendell Berry	"The Great Interruption: A Story of a Famous Story of Old Port William and How It Ceased to Be Told (1935–1978)"	Threepenny Review (no.155)
Jamel Brinkley	"No More Than a Bubble"	LitMag (no.2)
Deborah Eisenberg	"The Third Tower"	Ploughshares (vol.44, no.1)
Julia Elliott	"Hellion"	The Georgia Review (vol.72, no.2)
Jeffrey Eugenides	"Bronze"	The New Yorker (February 5, 2018)
Ella Martinsen Gorham	"Protozoa"	New England Review (vol.39, no.4)
Nicole Krauss	"Seeing Ershadi"	The New Yorker (March 5, 2018)
Ursula K. Le Guin	"Pity and Shame"	Tin House (vol.19, no.4)
Manuel Muñoz	"Anyone Can Do It"	ZYZZYVA (no.113)
Sigrid Nunez	"The Plan"	LitMag (no.2)
Maria Reva	"Letter of Apology"	Granta (no.145)
Karen Russell	"Black Corfu"	Zoetrope (vol.22, no.2)
Saïd Sayrafiezadeh	"Audition"	The New Yorker (September 10, 2018)
Alexis Schaitkin	"Natural Disasters"	Ecotone (no.24)
Jim Shepard	"Our Day of Grace"	Zoetrope (Vol.22, no.1)
Mona Simpson	"Wrong Object"	Harper's Magazine (November 2018)
Jenn Alandy Trahan	"They Told Us Not to Say This"	Harper's Magazine (September 2018)
Weike Wang	"Omakase"	The New Yorker (July 18, 2018)

== Reception ==
In a review of The Best American Short Stories 2019 in the New York Journal of Books, Anjanette Delgado stated that the collection's stories are "unabashedly political, aware of their context, of the times we live, and understand their role in this particular time and age." She wrote that over the years critics have commented on each guest editor in the series, and their sometimes "controversial choices", but in this selection Delgado said "the quality of the writing is never in dispute."

Writing in AudioFile magazine, Leslie B. Fine remarked that the stories in this collection "provides glimpses of worlds, minds, and dreams that are tragic, wistful, disturbing, and thought-provoking." She said that the authors exploit the short form to the fullest, and Fine called their characters "outstanding" in the way they bring each story to life. Kirkus Reviews described the book as "[a] fine celebration of the many guises a short story can take while still doing its essential work". It called Adjei-Brenyah's story "The Era" the highlight of the collection.
