= Joseph Han =

Joseph Han may refer to:

- Joseph Han Yingjin (born 1958), Chinese Roman Catholic bishop in Sanyuan (Shaanxi)
- Joseph Han Zhihai (born 1966), Chinese Roman Catholic bishop in Lanzhou
- Joseph Han (writer), Korean American writer
