= Objects of Desire =

Objects of Desire may refer to:

- Objects of Desire (album), a 1982 album by Michael Franks
- Objects of Desire (short story collection), a 2021 short story collection by Clare Sestanovich
