= Uprise Books Project =

American non-profit

The Uprise Books Project
- Founded: 2011
- Founder: Justin Stanley
- Dissolved: 2016
- Type: Nonprofit
- Location: Vancouver, Washington

Uprise Books Project was a non-profit organization in the United States that provided banned books to underprivileged teenagers. It was created in 2011 with the support of a $10,000 Kickstarter campaign, and announced its closure in 2016.

The organization was based in Vancouver, Washington. It was run by Justin Stanley and was open to students aged 13–18 who would be means-tested to confirm their eligibility. Students would then check the list of available books, choose the book they wished to read and a donor would supply it. Available books were based on lists from groups such as ALA and ACLU. In May 2013, the Uprise Books Project was selected as one of the National Book Foundation's Innovations in Reading Prize winners.

Over its nearly four and a half years of operations, the Uprise Books Project said it supplied banned books to 4,000 underprivileged teens and raised almost $25,000 in donations. The organization announced it was ceasing operations in a 2016 blog post attributed to Stanley, in which he said the volunteer endeavor lacked "the time, energy, or funding" to continue.

== Sources ==
- Young, Ginger (April 4, 2012). "Getting books in kids' minds". The News & Observer.
- Hetherington, Susan (February 8, 2012). "Forbidden fruit". 612 ABC Brisbane. Australian Broadcasting Corporation. Archived from the original on March 4, 2016.
- Coren, Michael J. (January 20, 2012). "How To Get Kids To Read? Give Them Banned Books". Co.Exist. Fast Company.
- Hoppen, Natascha Helena Franz (2011). "O adolescente contemporâneo e seus interesses literários" [The teenager and their contemporary literary interests] (in Spanish). Universidade Federal do Rio Grande do Sul. p. 75.
- Hallett, Alison (December 22, 2011). "Creatively Constructive - Four Local Organizations Combine Outreach and Art". The Portland Mercury.
- Abrams, Dennis (October 4, 2011). "UpRise Books Project: Bringing Banned Books To Those in Need". Publishing Perspectives.
- Yin, Maryann (October 3, 2011). "Kickstarter Project to Give Teens Access to Banned Books". Galleycat. Mediabistro.com. Archived from the original on October 28, 2011.
- Habash, Gabe (September 27, 2011). "Uprise Aims to Bring Banned Books to Underprivileged Teens". Publishers Weekly.
- "Banned books eyed to get teens reading". Bits 'n' Pieces. The Columbian. September 26, 2011.
- Hallett, Alison (September 22, 2011). "The Uprise Books Project - Putting Banned Books in the Hands of Underprivileged Teens". The Portland Mercury.
- "Innovations in Reading Prize Winners, 2013, National Book Foundation, Presenter of National Book Awards". May 2013.
