= Samantha Hunt =

American novelist (born 1971)

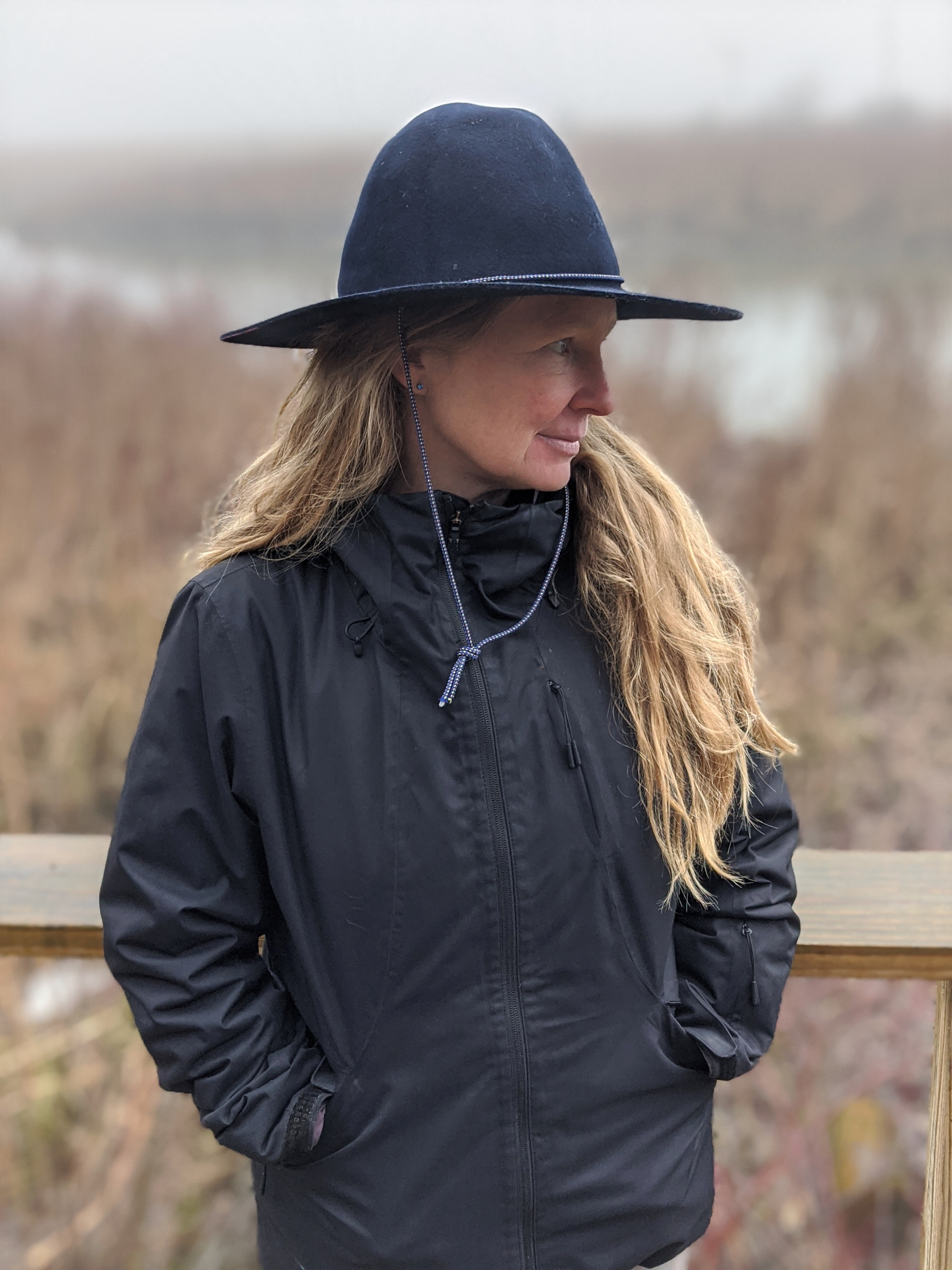
- Born: May 15, 1971 (age 55)
- Education: Warren Wilson College (MFA)
- Occupation: Novelist
- Writing career
- Language: English
- Notable works: The Seas , The Dark Dark,Mr. Splitfoot,The Invention of Everything Else, The Unwritten Book
- Notable awards: St. Francis College Literary Prize
- Website: www.samanthahunt.net

Samantha Hunt (born May 15, 1971) is an American novelist, essayist and short story writer.

She is the author of The Dark Dark and The Unwritten Book, published by Farrar, Straus, Giroux; The Seas, published by MacAdam/Cage and Tin House; and the novels Mr. Splitfoot and The Invention of Everything Else, published by Houghton Mifflin Harcourt.

== Early life ==
Hunt was born the youngest of six children in 1971. Her father was an editor, her mother is a painter. She moved in 1989 to attend the University of Vermont, where she studied literature, printmaking and geology. She received her MFA from Warren Wilson College, before moving to New York City in 1999.

== Career ==
=== Books ===
Hunt's debut novel, The Seas, first published in 2004, is a magical-realist novel about a young girl in a Northern town who believes herself to be a mermaid. The book was voted one of the Village Voice Literary Supplement's Favorite Books of 2004, and won the National Book Foundation award for 5 Under 35 in 2006. In 2018, The Seas was republished by Tin House Books in 2018 with a foreword by Maggie Nelson.

In 2008, she published her second novel, The Invention of Everything Else through Houghton Mifflin Harcourt. The novel provides a fictionalized account of the final days of inventor Nikola Tesla. It won both the Bard Fiction Prize in 2010, and was shortlisted for the Orange Prize.

Her other novels include Mr. Splitfoot (2016), a ghost story, and The Dark Dark: Stories (2017), a collection of short stories.

Hunt's short stories and essays have appeared in The New Yorker, New York Times Magazine, McSweeney's, The Atlantic, A Public Space, Cabinet, Esquire, The Believer, Blind Spot, Harper’s Bazaar, The Village Voice, Seed Magazine, Tin House, New York Magazine, on the radio program This American Life and in a number of anthologies including Trampoline edited by Kelly Link. Hunt's play, The Difference Engine, a story about the life of Charles Babbage, was produced by the Theater of a Two-Headed Calf.

=== Awards ===
Hunt won the Bard Fiction Prize, the National Book Foundation's 5 Under 35 award, the St. Francis College Literary Prize and was a finalist for the Orange Prize. In 2017, she received a Guggenheim Fellowship for fiction.

=== Literary influences ===
Hunt's credits her experiences growing up one of six children for her interest in literature, her dialogue, and her fictional portrayals of motherhood.

=== Profession ===
Hunt is a professor of writing at the Pratt Institute in Brooklyn, NY.

== Bibliography ==
=== Books ===
- The Unwritten Book (2022)
- The Dark Dark: Stories (2017)
- Mr Splitfoot (2016)
- The Invention of Everything Else (2008) Reading at Google
- The Seas (2004)
- My Inventions and Other Writings by Nikola Tesla and Samantha Hunt (introduction - 2011)

=== Online texts ===
==== Short stories ====
- "A Love Story", The New Yorker, 22 May 2017
- "The Yellow", The New Yorker, 21 November 2010
- "Three Days", The New Yorker, 8 January 2016
- "Go Team", The Atlantic, March 2020

==== Essays ====
- "There Is Only One Direction", New York Magazine, 12 May 2015
- "Queer Theorem", Lapham's Quarterly, Vol. 10, No. 2, Spring 2017
- "Terrible Twins", The New York Times Magazine, 1 April 2011
- "Swiss Near-Miss", This American Life, 11 June 2014
- "A Brief History of Books That Do Not Exist", Lithub, 4 January 2016
