= The Invention of Everything Else =

2008 novel Samantha Hunt

- Author: Samantha Hunt
- Language: English
- Genre: Novel
- Publisher: Houghton Mifflin Harcourt
- Publication date: 2008
- Publication place: United States
- Media type: Print (Hardcover & Paperback)
- Pages: 272 pp
- ISBN: 978-0-618-80112-1
- OCLC: 85822630
- Dewey Decimal: 813/.6 22
- LC Class: PS3608.U585 I58 2008

The Invention of Everything Else is a 2008 novel written by American author Samantha Hunt. The novel presents a fictionalized account of the last days in the life of Nikola Tesla, the Serbian-American electrical engineer. Other fictionalized versions of historical characters include Thomas Edison (a rival), George Westinghouse, and Mark Twain. Tesla is the novel's protagonist along with a chambermaid named Louisa with whom he shares some common interests including science and pigeons. Much of the book takes place in the New Yorker Hotel. The book also includes elements of science fiction, namely time travel.

The author, Samantha Hunt, received a National Book Foundation award for authors under 35, for her previous novel, The Seas. The Invention of Everything Else was shortlisted for an award from Believer magazine and shortlisted for the Orange Prize. She won the Bard Fiction Prize for 2010.
