= C Pam Zhang =

Chinese American writer

- 张辰极
- Born: Zhang Chenji; 1990 (age 35–36); Beijing, China
- Education: Brown University; Cambridge University; Iowa Writers' Workshop
- Occupation: Writer
- Writing career
- Genres: fiction, nonfiction
- Notable works: How Much of These Hills Is Gold (2020); Land of Milk and Honey (2023)
- Notable awards: 5 Under 35 Honoree (2020); California Book Award (2020); MacDowell Fellow (2023)
- Website: cpamzhang.com

C Pam Zhang
- Traditional Chinese: 張辰極
- Simplified Chinese: 张辰极
Transcriptions
Standard Mandarin
- Hanyu Pinyin: Zhāng Chénjí

C Pam Zhang (born 1990) is an American novelist and essayist. She is the author of the novels How Much of These Hills Is Gold and Land of Milk and Honey. In 2020, Zhang was named a "5 Under 35" Honoree by the National Book Foundation.

== Early life and education ==
Zhang was born in Beijing in 1990 and moved to the United States, where her parents were already living, when she was four years old. Zhang's mother took part in the 1989 Tiananmen Square protests. According to Zhang, she has very little memory of her early life in China, having also lost full fluency in her native Chinese since her parents mostly spoke to her in English. Before emigrating, she lived with her grandparents, who taught her classic Chinese poems while she was still a toddler, with Zhang able to recite several works by memory by the time she was three years old.

The C in her pen name stands for her Chinese name, Chenji.

After living in Lexington, Kentucky, for four years, Zhang's family moved to Salinas, California, and by the time Zhang was eighteen, she had moved a total of ten times within the country. She attended high school in the Albany Unified School District.

Zhang attended Brown University and studied at Cambridge University. She was a 2017 Truman Capote Fellow at the Iowa Writers' Workshop, where she received her Master of Fine Arts in Creative Writing in 2019.

== Career ==
Zhang has been awarded support from Tin House, Bread Loaf, and Aspen Words. Her writing has appeared in The Cut, The New Yorker, Esquire, Kenyon Review, and The New York Times. Her work has been translated into twelve languages.

In 2020, Zhang was named a "5 Under 35" Honoree by the National Book Foundation. She was a 2022-2023 Cullman Center Fellow at the New York Public Library. She is the recipient of a 2023 MacDowell Fellowship in Literature.

Zhang's essay "The Taste of Her Care", published in Esquire in 2023, was a finalist for the James Beard Award.

She was the 2026 Stein Visiting Writer at Stanford University.

=== How Much of These Hills Is Gold (2020) ===
Zhang's debut novel, How Much of These Hills Is Gold, published in 2020, follows two recently orphaned children of immigrants on the run, trying not just to survive but to find a home. The novel is set against the twilight of the American gold rush. How Much of These Hills Is Gold is inspired by Zhang's childhood of moving homes often. It reckons with the grief she experienced after losing her father when she was twenty-two. The novel began as a passion project not meant for publication while she lived in Bangkok.

The New York Times said, "C Pam Zhang’s arresting, beautiful first novel is filled with myths of her own making as well as sorrows and joys." The San Francisco Chronicle wrote that Zhang's novel is "a fully immersive epic drama packed with narrative riches and exquisitely crafted prose … . Zhang captures not only the mesmeric beauty and storied history of America's sacred landscape, but also the harsh sacrifices countless people were forced to make in hopes of laying claim to its bounty."

The novel won the Academy of Arts and Letters Rosenthal Award, the Asian/Pacific Award for Literature, and the California Book Award. It was longlisted for the Booker Prize and was a finalist for the Lambda Literary Award for Bisexual Fiction.

=== Land of Milk and Honey (2023) ===
Zhang's second novel, Land of Milk and Honey, published in 2023, is set in a near-future ecological crisis where a global smog has wiped out biodiversity and collapsed agriculture. The protagonist, a 29-year-old unnamed Asian American chef, leaves collapsed England to work in a secluded elite research facility in the Italian Alps. The mountain enclave, owned by a reclusive capitalist, is one of the few places where food still grows. It serves as both a biobank and a sanctuary for investors and scientists developing genetically engineered plants and animals. The chef is hired to prepare elaborate meals from rare and extinct ingredients for wealthy backers. Her culinary work is used to evoke emotion and secure financial support. The book explores moral dilemmas about resource hoarding, scientific elitism, and survival amid collapse.

The novel was listed in The New York Times 100 Notable Books for 2023. It was longlisted for the 2024 Aspen Words Literary Prize and the 2024 Carol Shields Prize for Fiction.

== Personal life ==
She has maintained residency between San Francisco, California and Brooklyn, New York. She previously spent time in the United Kingdom.

== Awards ==
Year	Work	Award	Category	Result	Ref
2020	How Much of These Hills Is Gold	Booker Prize	—	Longlisted	
2020	How Much of These Hills Is Gold	Booklist Best First Novels on Audio	—	Top 10	
2020	How Much of These Hills Is Gold	California Book Award	First Fiction (Gold)	Won	
2020	How Much of These Hills Is Gold	Center for Fiction First Novel Prize	—	Shortlisted	
2020	How Much of These Hills Is Gold	Goodreads Choice Award	Debut Novel	Nominated	
2020	How Much of These Hills Is Gold	Reading Women Award	Fiction	Nominated	
2021	How Much of These Hills Is Gold	American Academy of Arts and Letters Rosenthal Family Foundation Award	—	Won	
2021	How Much of These Hills Is Gold	Asian/Pacific American Award for Literature	Adult Fiction	Won	
2021	How Much of These Hills Is Gold	Lambda Literary Award	Bisexual Fiction	Shortlisted	
2021	How Much of These Hills Is Gold	National Book Critics Circle Award	John Leonard Prize	Shortlisted	
2021	How Much of These Hills Is Gold	PEN/Hemingway Award	—	Shortlisted	
2021	How Much of These Hills Is Gold	Young Lions Fiction Award	—	Finalist	
2023	Land of Milk and Honey	Goodreads Choice Awards	Science Fiction	Nominated	
2024	Land of Milk and Honey	Aspen Words Literary Prize	—	Longlisted	
2024	Land of Milk and Honey	Audie Award	Fiction Narrator	Shortlisted	
2024	Land of Milk and Honey	BookTube Prize	Fiction	Octofinalist	
2024	Land of Milk and Honey	Carol Shields Prize for Fiction	—	Longlisted	
2024	Land of Milk and Honey	Young Lions Fiction Award	—	Finalist	
2024	"The Taste of Her Care"	James Beard Award	Personal Essay	Finalist	

== Selected texts ==
=== Novels ===
- —— (2020). How Much of These Hills Is Gold. New York: Riverhead. ISBN 9780593189290.
- —— (2023). Land of Milk and Honey. New York: Riverhead. ISBN 9780593538241.

=== Anthologies ===
- Jesmyn Ward; Heidi Pitlor, eds. (2021). The Best American Short Stories 2021. Mariner Books. ISBN 9781328485397.
- Padma Lakshmi; Jaya Saxena, eds. (2024). The Best American Food and Travel Writing 2024. Mariner Books. ISBN 9780063370647.
