= The Book of Life =

The Book of Life may refer to:

- Book of Life, in Judaism and Christianity, a book in which God records the names of every person who is destined for Heaven and the world to come

== Film ==
- The Book of Life (1998 film), a 1998 American film directed by Hal Hartley
- The Book of Life (2014 film), a 2014 American animated film directed by Jorge Gutierrez

== Literature ==
- The Book of Life, a 1921 book by Upton Sinclair
- The Book of Life, a 2011 short story collection by Stuart Nadler
- The Book of Life (Harkness novel), a 2014 novel by Deborah Harkness
- The Book of Life: An Illustrated History of the Evolution of Life on Earth, a 1993 book edited by Stephen Jay Gould
- The Book of Life: Daily Meditations with Krishnamurti, a 1995 book by Jiddu Krishnamurti

== Music ==
- The Book of Life of the Doukhobors, a hymnal of the Doukhobors
- Book of Life (album), a 2007 album by I Wayne
- The Book of Life, a compilation album by Eric B. & Rakim, included on Rakim's 1997 album The 18th Letter
