= Crimes Against Humanity (film) =

- Directed by: Jerzy Rose
- Written by: Halle Butler; Jerzy Rose
- Starring: Mike Lopez; Lyra Hill; Ted Tremper
- Cinematography: Robert Cauble
- Edited by: Jerzy Rose
- Music by: Joshua Dumas
- Production company: Tarwathie Films
- Release date: 18 January 2014 (Slamdance Film Festival)
- Running time: 77 minutes
- Country: United States
- Language: English

Crimes Against Humanity is a 2014 American comedy film directed by Jerzy Rose, starring Mike Lopez, Lyra Hill and Ted Tremper.

== Cast ==
- Mike Lopez as Lewis Henry
- Lyra Hill as Brownie Fromm
- Ted Tremper as Rory O'Rear
- Adebukola Bodunrin as Frenchie Sessions
- Adam Paul as John Folder
- Tommy Heffron as Prof. Henson Bower
- Jim Trainor as Dean Christian Manlow
- Chris Sullivan as Officer Courtney Dolan
- Jared Larson as Alvin Henry
- Joshua Dumas as Prof. Sydney Pond
- Salome Chasnoff as Helen Cormick
- Lori Felker as Ester Candle

== Reception ==
Jessica Brice Young of Orlando Weekly rated the film 4 stars out of 5 and wrote that it "comes on like an Iris Murdoch novel transposed to the here and now, each character fully realized and finely drawn." She praised the performances of Hill, Bodunrin, Larson, Heffron and Dumas.

Alexander Ortega of SLUG Magazine wrote: "It’s not a banger, but this film is worth a gander if not for its darkly comedic tone and Brownie’s gleeful yet hopeful quasi-triumph in the end."

Nina Metz of the Chicago Tribune wrote that while the film "has a languorous quality that borders on uncertainty", Hill's "wide-eyed, increasingly mangled deadpan gaze is worthy of a silent comedy all its own."

Dennis Harvey of Variety wrote that the film has "a lot of snark but not much actual amusement".
