= Zinzi Clemmons =

American writer (born 1985)

- Born: 1985 (age 40–41)
- Education: Brown University; Columbia University (MFA)
- Occupation: Writer
- Notable work: What We Lose (2017)
- Spouse: André Naffis-Sahely
- Relatives: Phife Dawg (cousin)
- Website: zinziclemmons.com

Zinzi Clemmons (born 1985) is an American writer. She is known for her 2017 debut novel What We Lose.

== Personal life ==
Born in 1985 to a multi-ethnic South African mother from an upper-middle-class family in Johannesburg and African-American father raised in Jamaica, Queens, Zinzi Clemmons grew up in Swarthmore, Pennsylvania and spent summers in South Africa. Rapper Phife Dawg, of the group A Tribe Called Quest, was her cousin.

Clemmons attended Brown University as an undergraduate, studying critical theory, then earned an MFA in fiction at Columbia University, where she worked with Paul Beatty. In 2012 she moved home and paused the novel she was working on to care for her mother who was dying of cancer. She began keeping a diary of the experience, which later served as some of the source material for her first novel.

Clemmons is married to poet and translator André Naffis-Sahely. They live in Culver City, near Los Angeles.

== Career ==
While still at Columbia, Clemmons founded Apogee, an online magazine focused on art engaged with issues of identity.

Clemmons' debut novel What We Lose was published by Viking in 2017. The book was loosely based on Clemmons' own experience being the primary caregiver for her mother when she died of cancer, and was described by The Guardian as "highly experimental, told in intimate vignettes including blogposts, photos, hand-drawn charts and hip-hop lyrics". It received broad critical acclaim, with Vogue calling What We Lose the best debut novel of the year. Writing in The New Yorker, Doreen St. Félix situated the book as part of the literary canon of the black diaspora, noting its thematic emphasis on haunting.

In 2017, the National Book Foundation named Clemmons to its annual 5 Under 35 list, selected by Angela Flournoy. The same year, she announced she would no longer write for the Lenny Letter and asked other women of color to join her after Lenny's founder Lena Dunham issued a statement defending coworker Murray Miller, who had been accused of rape by Aurora Perrineau, a biracial actress.

In May 2018, Clemmons accused the writer Junot Díaz of sexual harassment at a workshop when she was a graduate student, following a confrontation with Díaz at the Sydney Writers' Festival. Díaz later denied the allegations. The public response sparked some controversy among feminist academics regarding how race and ethnicity affects the handling of sexual harassment allegations in the context of the Me Too movement. After an investigation, it was determined that Díaz kissed her on her cheek.

=== Awards ===
Awards for What We Lose
Year	Award	Result	Ref.
2017	Goodreads Choice Award for Debut Goodreads Author	Finalist	
2018	Andrew Carnegie Medal for Fiction	Longlist	
2018	Aspen Words Literary Prize	Shortlist	
2018	Hurston/Wright Legacy Award for Debut Novel	Finalist	

=== Publications ===
- What We Lose (2017)
- Well-Read Black Girl: Finding Our Stories, Discovering Ourselves, edited by Glory Edim (2018)
- Freedom: Essays (2026)
