= Sana Krasikov =

Ukrainian-born writer in the United States

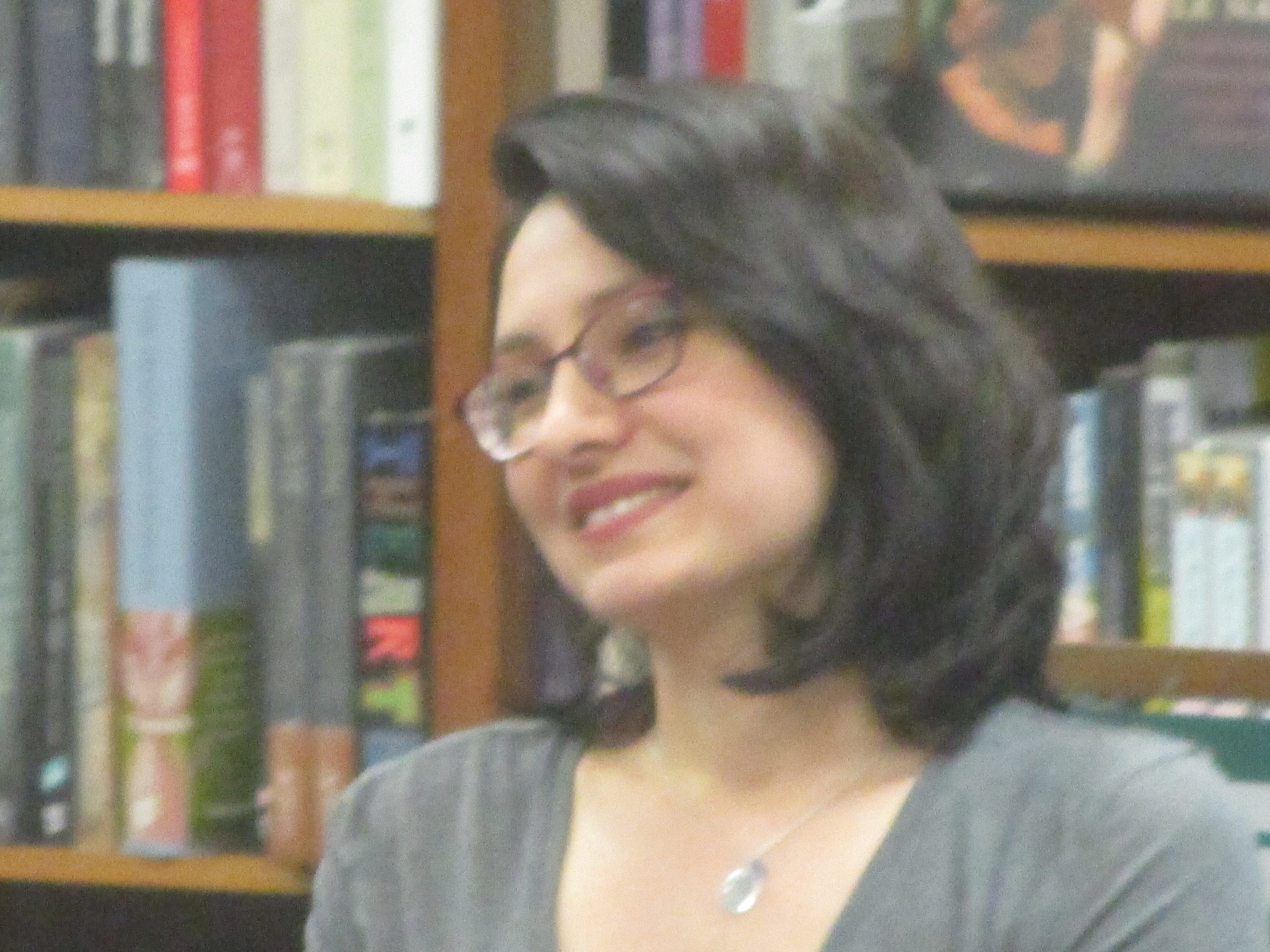
- Krasikov in 2017
- Education: Cornell University; Iowa Writers' Workshop
- Occupation: Writer
- Spouse: Gregory Warner (m. 2009)
- Writing career
- Genres: novel, short story
- Website: sanakrasikov.com

Sana Krasikov is a Ukrainian-born writer living in the United States, best known for One More Year (2008) and The Patriots (2017). She grew up in the Republic of Georgia, as well as the United States. She graduated from Cornell University in 2001, living at the Telluride House during her time there, and from the Iowa Writers' Workshop. In 2017 she was named one of Granta's Best Young American Novelists. In 2019 The Patriots won France's Prix du Premiere Roman Etranger, an award for best first novel in translation.

== Career ==
Krasikov is the author of the novel The Patriots, which explores the tangled relationship between Russia and America through the perspectives of one American family moving back and forth between continents over three generations. The novel's main character, Florence Fein, makes a reverse immigration from Brooklyn to Moscow during the Great Depression. The story also touches on Russia's state-supported oil and gas industry. The Spectator has written, "as an intelligent literary commentary on Russo-American relations of the past century, it's unparalleled." The Patriots has been praised as 'timely', 'current' and 'urgently relevant' by The New York Times, Tablet, The Guardian, and other publications.

Krasikov's debut short story collection, One More Year, released in 2008, first drew critical acclaim for its exploration of the lives of Russian and Georgian immigrants who had settled in the United States. It received favorable reviews from the San Francisco Chronicle, The Boston Globe, Oprah Magazine, Entertainment Weekly, The New York Times, and The New York Sun. It was later named a finalist for the 2009 PEN/Hemingway Award and the New York Public Library's Young Lions Fiction Award, received a National Book Foundation's 5 Under 35 Award, and won the 2009 Sami Rohr Prize for Jewish Literature. In her stories, which appeared first in The New Yorker, The Atlantic, Zoetrope and other magazines, one catches a glimpse of the new twenty-first century moment that followed the collapse of the Soviet Union. The short story "Companion", won an O.Henry Award, and was longlisted for The Best American Short Stories, as were two other stories in the collection. The story "Asal", which appeared in The Virginia Quarterly, garnered a National Magazine Award nomination. One More Year has gone on to be translated into eleven languages.

"The Muddle" was first published in The New Yorker in 2022, only a few months after the Russian invasion of Ukraine and selected for 2023 edition of The Best American Short Stories anthology series. It depicts divisions among friends and a multigenerational family, including a Russian-Ukrainian mixed marriage.

== Personal life ==
Krasikov has been married to radio journalist Gregory Warner since 2009. In 2016 Warner and Krasikov conceived and developed a narrative podcast called Rough Translation. The show which takes topics familiar to Americans—fake news, affirmative action, dating, surrogacy—and examines them through a new cultural lens. Rough Translation is currently hosted by Gregory Warner for NPR. Krasikov continues to assist in story-shaping and editing of episodes.

== Awards ==
=== Literary awards ===
Year	Work	Award	Category	Result	Ref
2009	One More Year	PEN/Hemingway Award	—	Shortlisted	
2009	One More Year	Sami Rohr Prize for Jewish Fiction	—	Won	
2009	One More Year	Young Lions Fiction Award	—	Shortlisted	
2009	"Asal"	National Magazine Award	—	Nominated	
2019	The Patriots	Prix du Premier Roman	Etranger	Won	
N/A	"Companion"	O. Henry Award	—	Won	

=== Honors ===
- 2008 National Book Foundation's "5 Under 35"
- 2017 Granta's Best Young American Novelists
- 2019-2020 Cullman Fellowship (Rona Jaffe Foundation Fellow) from the New York Public Library

== Works ==
- —— (2008). One More Year. London: Portobello. ISBN 9781846271786.
- —— (2017). The Patriots. Random House Inc. ISBN 9780385524414.

=== Anthologized contribution ===
- Krasikov, Sana (2023). "The Muddle". The Best American Short Stories 2023. Marine Books: 145–164. ISBN 9780063275911. Originally published in The New Yorker, Aug 15, 2022.
