= Morgan Talty =

American writer (born 1991)

- Born: 1991 (age 34–35)
- Education: Dartmouth University (BA); University of Southern Maine (MFA)
- Occupation: Writer
- Writing career
- Language: English
- Years active: 2022-present
- Notable works: Night of the Living Rez (2022); Fire Exit (2024)
- Notable awards: 2022 NEA Fellowship; 2022 John Leonard Prize; 2023 PEN/Robert W. Bingham Prize; 2023 Sue Kaufman Prize for First Fiction

Morgan Talty (born 1991) is a Penobscot writer and an assistant professor of English in Creative Writing and Native American and Contemporary Literature at the University of Maine in Orono. In 2022, he received a fellowship from the National Endowment for the Arts. In 2023, Talty was named a "5 Under 35" Honoree by the National Book Foundation.

== Early life and education ==
Morgan Talty was born in Bridgeport, Connecticut, and lived there until he was six. He and his mother moved to the Penobscot Indian Nation in Maine, where he lived until the age of eighteen. He started studying creative writing in community college.

Talty graduated from Dartmouth College with a BA in Native American studies. He later received his MFA in fiction from the Stonecoast MFA Program in Creative Writing at the University of Southern Maine.

== Career ==
He teaches at Stonecoast and at the University of Maine. His work has appeared in Narrative Magazine, Granta, RED INK, and The Georgia Review.

=== Night of the Living Rez (2022) ===
Talty's first book, Night of the Living Rez, a collection of twelve short stories, was published July 5, 2022 by Tin House Books.

Night of the Living Rez was widely covered by periodicals and literary magazines. The book received starred reviews from Booklist, Kirkus Reviews, and Publishers Weekly. Publishers Weekly named it one of the top ten works of fiction published in 2022. It won the 2022 New England Book Award for Fiction and was a runner-up for the Barnes & Noble Discover Prize. A finalist for The Story Prize, it won the 2023 John Leonard Prize, awarded by the National Book Critics Circle for a first book in any genre, and was shortlisted the 2023 Andrew Carnegie Medal for Excellence in Fiction.

=== Fire Exit (2024) ===
Talty's debut novel, Fire Exit, was published June 4, 2024 by Tin House Books.

Fire Exit was nominated for numerous awards, including the 2024 Center for Fiction First Novel Prize, 2025 VCU Cabell First Novelist Award, and the 2025 PEN/Hemingway Award for Debut Novel. It won the 2025 Housatonic Book Award for Fiction.

== Personal life ==
Talty is married and has one son named Charlie.

== Awards ==
Year	Work	Award	Category	Result	Ref.
2021	—	Narrative Prize	—	Won	
2022	Night of the Living Rez	Barnes & Noble Discover Great New Writers Award	Fiction	Shortlisted	
2022	Night of the Living Rez	National Book Critics Circle Award	John Leonard Prize	Won	
2022	Night of the Living Rez	New England Book Award	Fiction	Won	
2022	Night of the Living Rez	The Story Prize	—	Finalist	
2023	Night of the Living Rez	Andrew Carnegie Medals for Excellence	Fiction	Shortlisted	
2023	Night of the Living Rez	Ignyte Award	Anthology/Collection	Shortlisted	
2023	Night of the Living Rez	Maine Literary Award	Fiction	Won	
2023	Night of the Living Rez	Mark Twain American Voice in Literature Award	—	Shortlisted	
2023	Night of the Living Rez	PEN/Jean Stein Book Award	—	Longlisted	
2023	Night of the Living Rez	PEN/Robert W. Bingham Prize	—	Won	
2023	Night of the Living Rez	Sue Kaufman Prize for First Fiction	—	Won	
2024	Fire Exit	Center for Fiction First Novel Prize	—	Shortlisted	
2024	Fire Exit	Maya Angelou Book Award	Fiction	Shortlisted	
2024	Fire Exit	New England Book Award	Fiction	Shortlisted	
2025	Fire Exit	Andrew Carnegie Medals for Excellence	Fiction	Longlisted	
2025	Fire Exit	Housatonic Book Award	Fiction	Won	
2025	Fire Exit	International Dublin Literary Award	—	Longlisted	
2025	Fire Exit	Joyce Carol Oates Prize	—	Finalist	
2025	Fire Exit	Mark Twain American Voice in Literature Award	—	Shortlisted	
2025	Fire Exit	PEN/Hemingway Award for Debut Novel	Debut Novel	Longlisted	
2025	Fire Exit	VCU Cabell First Novelist Award	—	Finalist	

== Publications ==
=== Collections ===
- —— (2022). Night of the Living Rez. Portland: Tin House Books. ISBN 9781953534187.

=== Novels ===
- —— (2024). Fire Exit. Portland: Tin House Books. ISBN 9781959030553.

=== Short stories ===
- "The Prepper" in Never Whistle at Night: An Indigenous Dark Fiction Anthology (September 2023)
