= Holding Pattern =

Holding Pattern or Holding Patterns may refer to:

- Holding pattern, a maneuver to delay an aircraft in flight while keeping it within a specified airspace
- Holding Pattern (novel), by Jenny Xie, 2023
- Holding Patterns, working title of Almost Friends (2016 film)
- Holding Patterns, a 2016 album by Laurence Fox
