= Shani Boianjiu =

Israeli author

- שני בוינג'ו
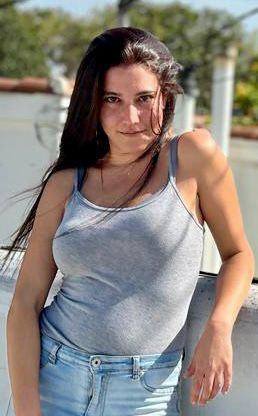
- Shani Boianjiu, 2022
- Born: 30 May 1987 (age 39); Jerusalem, Israel
- Citizenship: Israeli
- Education: Harvard University
- Occupation: Writer
- Writing career
- Language: Hebrew, English

Shani Boianjiu (Hebrew: שני בוינג'ו; born 30 May 1987) is an Israeli author. Her debut novel, The People of Forever Are Not Afraid, was released in 2012, and has been published in 23 countries. In 2011 the National Book Foundation named her a 5 Under 35 honoree.

== Biography ==
Boianjiu was born in Jerusalem to parents of Iraqi and Romanian descent, and grew up in Ma'alot Tarshiha and Kfar Vradim in the Western Galilee. She attended Phillips Exeter Academy, graduating in 2005. After two years of service in the Israel Defense Forces, she attended Harvard, graduating in 2011.

While at Harvard, Boianjiu served as president of the Radcliffe Union of Students, Harvard's feminist organization, and as the co-chair of Quincy House House's Committee. She was a junior research partner at the Radcliffe Institute for Advanced study, working for the scholar Reuven Snir. In the summer of 2008, she attended summer school at Waseda University, Tokyo. In the summer of 2009, she interned at the Association for Civil Rights in Israel. In the summer of 2010, she used the funds she received as an Artist Development Fellowship recipient to rent an apartment right across from Iowa City's jail and write fiction.

She lives in the Western Galilee and is currently completing work on her second novel.

Boianjiu's writing has appeared in The New York Times, The New Yorker, Zoetrope, Vice, The Wall Street Journal, The Globe and Mail, Dazed and Confused, The Guardian, NPR.org, Chatelaine and Flavorwire.

== Awards and recognition ==
Boianjiu was the first Israeli author to be longlisted for the UK's Women's Prize for Fiction, and the youngest nominee that year (2013). Her debut novel was selected as one of the ten best fiction titles of 2012 by The Wall Street Journal, as one of the Pakistani Herald's best books of 2012, as one of the Swedish Sydsvenskan's best books of 2013, and as one of the Israeli Haaretz's best books of 2014.

Boianjiu is the youngest recipient ever of the National Book Foundation's 5 Under 35 award, based on a recommendation from the writer Nicole Krauss. She was a finalist for the 2013 Sami Rohr Prize for Jewish Literature, a semi-finalist for the VCU Cabell First Novelist Award, and selected as one of The Algemeiner's Jewish 100. She was shortlisted for the 2014 Jewish Quarterly Wingate Prize.
