= Savage Tongues =

2021 novel by Azareen Van der Vliet Oloomi

- Author: Azareen Van der Vliet Oloomi
- Publisher: Mariner Books
- Publication date: August 3, 2021
- ISBN: 9780358315063

Savage Tongues is a 2021 novel by Azareen Van der Vliet Oloomi.

== Reception ==
Savage Tongues received mixed reviews from critics.

Positive reviews came from Asian Review of Books, The Washington Post, the Los Angeles Review of Books, and Mountain Times.

Writing for The Asian Review of Books, Jane Wallace called Savage Tongues "brilliant, erotic and piercing," highlighting how "Van der Vliet Oloomi shines new light into how historical oppression, both at a personal and societal level, continues to dominate our present-day thinking."

The Washington Post's Ellen Akins said Savage Tongues is "a novel of ideas if ever there was one". Anita Gill, writing for the Los Angeles Review of Books, highlighted this notion: "Arezu’s narration captures the complexity of how a mind learns to cope. Fragmented memories surface in each chapter, receding and returning numerous times, coming into sharper focus with each pass. This attention to narrative, executed so diligently, allows the reader to witness a mind carefully excavating buried violence [...] Oloomi’s novel examines trauma in a multifaceted way, her characters displaying a layered complexity and their social relationships revealing rich dimensions".

Also highlighting how Van der Vliet Oloomi addresses trauma in the novel, Tom Mayer, writing for Mountain Times, wrote, "Those who have lived through abuse will find either solace or torment in the pages of this revealing novel. Others will find understanding—a beginning comprehension of the attempt to voice the excavation of profound pain".

NPR's Kamil Ahsan provided a mixed review, noting that Savage Tongues "can be moving [...] but it suffers from a sense of repetition and a lack of intrigue. [...] Oloomi's premise itself is fascinating, and her task certainly made difficult by dint of the novel broadly outlining itself so early on. And every so often [...] the book makes a lot out of a little. But mostly it makes a little out of a lot. Such that whenever the rare polemic arrives, one wishes it would stay."

More negative reviews came from Kirkus Reviews and Publishers Weekly, both of whom provided Van der Vliet Oloomi's Call Me Zebra starred reviews. Kirkus Reviews called Savage Tongues "an intense but ultimately claustrophobic book in which a woman can’t get outside her own mind". Publishers Weekly said the "musings on Middle Eastern politics [...] add insight, but in the end, the weighty themes are sunk by portentous delivery."
