= Joseph Han (writer) =

Korean American writer

- Born: Seoul, South Korea
- Education: University of Hawaiʻi at Mānoa (PhD)
- Occupations: Writer, professor
- Honours: National Book Foundation's 5 Under 35
- Website: joseph-han.com

Joseph Han is a Korean American writer and professor. In 2022, he released his debut novel, Nuclear Family, which was published by Counterpoint Press, and was named in the National Book Foundation's 5 Under 35.

== Early life and education ==
Han was born in Seoul, South Korea, after which he grew up in Honolulu, Hawaii with his grandparents; his parents and younger sister joined him years later. His sister, Julie, would later become a member of the K-pop group Kiss of Life in 2023.

In college, Han took an interest in writing, specifically around questions pertinent to the history of the Korean diaspora. He attended the University of Hawaiʻi at Mānoa where he received a Doctor of Philosophy in English and Creative Writing and began working on his debut novel, Nuclear Family.

== Career ==
Han's work has been supported by the Kundiman Fellowship and Tin House. He has also served as an editor for Joyland. His writing—consisting of fiction, nonfiction, and poetry—has been featured in LitHub, Gulf Coast, McSweeney's Internet Tendency, and others. Additionally, after college, Han has taught Asian American literature, fiction writing, and composition at the University of Hawaiʻi at Mānoa and also served as a guest faculty member, in fiction, at the Antioch University Los Angeles' low-residency MFA in Creative Writing program.

In 2022, Han released Nuclear Family, a novel following a Korean family in 2018, months before the false missile alert, living in Hawaii. Han had based it on his own experiences as a Korean immigrant living there and reflected "my own coming into awareness, as a Korean settler on Hawaiian land, of Korea and Hawai'i's entangled histories of US occupation and militarization." It was selected for NPR's Book of the Day and was named an "inventive debut" by the Los Angeles Times. In the same year, Han was named as a National Book Foundation 5 Under 35 honoree; he had been selected by Azareen Van der Vliet Oloomi.

Han is currently at work on his next book, a short story collection titled Monster House.
