= Innovations in Reading Prize =

The Innovations in Reading Prize was an annual award given to organizations and individuals who "developed innovative means of creating and sustaining a lifelong love of reading." The prize was awarded by the National Book Foundation, presenter of the National Book Awards. The Innovations in Reading prize was founded in 2009, and from 2009 to 2014, the National Book Foundation recognized up to five winners, who each received $2,500. Beginning in 2015, the Foundation began recognizing a single $10,000 prize winner each year, as well as four honorable mentions. In 2018, the Foundation began recognizing each honorable mention organization with a $1,000 prize. The final award was given out in 2020.

== Innovations in Reading prize winners ==
2009

- Fathers Bridging the Miles (A Program of Read to Me International)
- Maricopa County Library District
- James Patterson's ReadKiddoRead.com
- readergirlz
- Robert Wilder

2010

- Cellpoems
- 826 Valencia
- Free Minds Book Club & Writing Workshop
- Mount Olive Baptist Church
- United Through Reading

2011

- Burton Freeman for My Own Book
- Kore Press
- Electric Literature/Electric Publisher
- YARN, the Young Adult Review Network

2012

- Bookends: A Television Program for Teens Who Like to Read
- Lilli Leight
- Literacy Chicago for Reading Against the Odds
- Street Books
- Inger Upchurch for Real Men Read Storytime and Mentoring

2013

- City National Bank for Reading Is the Way Up
- Little Free Library
- The Uni Project
- The Uprise Books Project
- Worldreader

2014

- Blue Star Families' Books on Bases
- Books For Kids
- Chicago Books to Women in Prison
- Hopa Mountain's Storymakers Program
- Las Comadres Para Las Americas

2015

- Reach Incorporated

2016

- Next Chapter Book Club

2017

- Barbershop Books

=== 2018 ===
- Teach This Poem

== Innovations in Reading Honorable Mentions ==
2015

- African Poetry Book Fund
- Call Me Ishmael
- Lambda Literary
- MotionPoems

2016

- The Harry Potter Alliance
- LGBT Books to Prisoners
- Limitless Libraries
- Traveling Stories

2017

- Books@Work
- Great Reading Games from Learning Ally
- Poetry-in-Motion
- Reach Out and Read

2018 ===

- The Appalachian Prison Book Project
- Friends of the Homer Library
- Jewish Women International's Library Initiative
- Words Without Borders Campus

2019

- West Philadelphia Alliance for Children (WePAC)

2020

- DIBS for Kids
