= Jennifer duBois =

American novelist

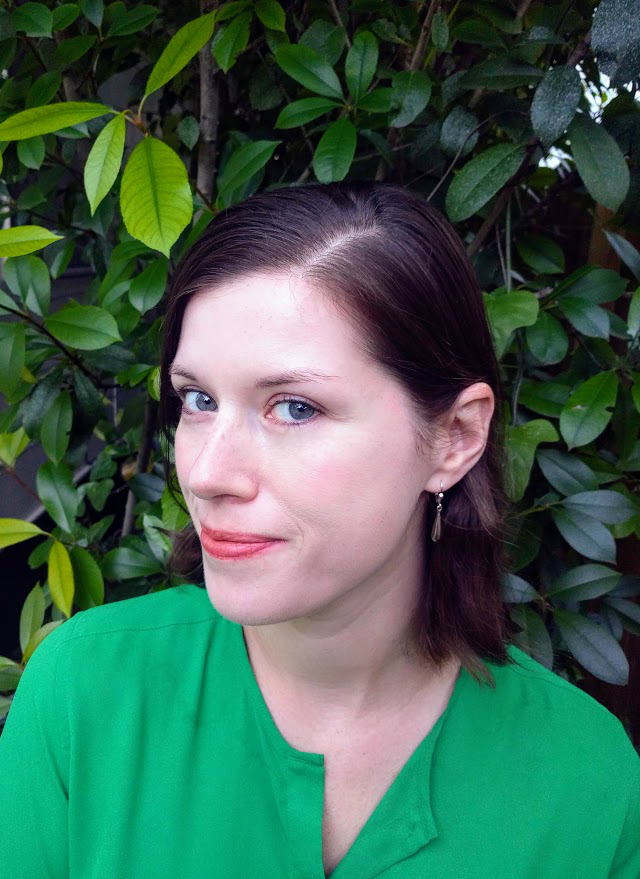
- Jennifer duBois in 2019
- Born: August 25, 1983 (age 43); Northampton, Massachusetts, U.S.
- Education: Tufts University
- Occupation: Novelist
- Writing career
- Notable awards: Whiting Award; Stegner Fellowship

Jennifer duBois (born August 25, 1983) is an American novelist. duBois is a recipient of a Whiting Award and has been named a National Book Foundation's 5 Under 35 honoree.

== Life and work ==
Born in Northampton, MA in 1983, duBois is a graduate of Tufts University with a degree in political science and philosophy, and also attended the Iowa Writers' Workshop. From 2009 to 2011, she was a Stegner Fellow at Stanford University.

Her debut novel, A Partial History of Lost Causes, was the winner of the California Book Award for First Fiction and the Northern California Book Award for Fiction, and was a finalist for the PEN/Hemingway Award for Debut Fiction. Her second novel, Cartwheel, was the winner of the Housatonic Book Award and a finalist for the New York Public Library’s Young Lions Award. In 2018, she received a fellowship from the National Endowment for the Arts for her third novel, The Spectators. Her fourth novel, The Last Language, was published in October of 2023. The story is about the main character exploring how language shapes human connection, interactions, and relationships.

Her short stories, novel excerpts, reviews, and essays have appeared in the New York Times, the Wall Street Journal, Playboy, Narrative, Lapham’s Quarterly, American Short Fiction, The Kenyon Review, The Missouri Review, Salon, Cosmopolitan, ZYZZYVA, and elsewhere.

duBois is a permanent member of the faculty at Texas State University, where she teaches Fiction in the Creative Writing Department. She lives in Austin, Texas.

== Novels ==
- A Partial History of Lost Causes: A Novel. Random House Publishing Group. 2012. ISBN 978-0-679-60474-7.
- Cartwheel: A Novel. Random House Publishing Group. 2013. ISBN 978-0-8129-9587-9.
- The Spectators: A Novel. Random House Publishing Group. 2019. ISBN 978-0812995886.
- The Last Language: A Novel. Milkweed Editions. 2023. ISBN 9781639551088.

== Awards and fellowships ==
- 2009–2011: Wallace Stegner Fellow, Stanford University
- 2012: National Book Foundation "5 Under 35" Honoree
- 2013: California Book Award for First Fiction (for A Partial History of Lost Causes)
- 2013: Northern California Book Award for Fiction (for A Partial History of Lost Causes)
- 2013: Finalist, PEN/Hemingway Prize for Debut Fiction (for A Partial History of Lost Causes)
- 2013: Whiting Award for Fiction
- 2014: Finalist, New York Public Library Young Lions Award (for Cartwheel)
- 2014: Housatonic Book Award (for Cartwheel)
- 2018: National Endowment for the Arts Fellow (for The Spectators)
