= Megan Kamalei Kakimoto =

American Hawaiian author (born 1993)

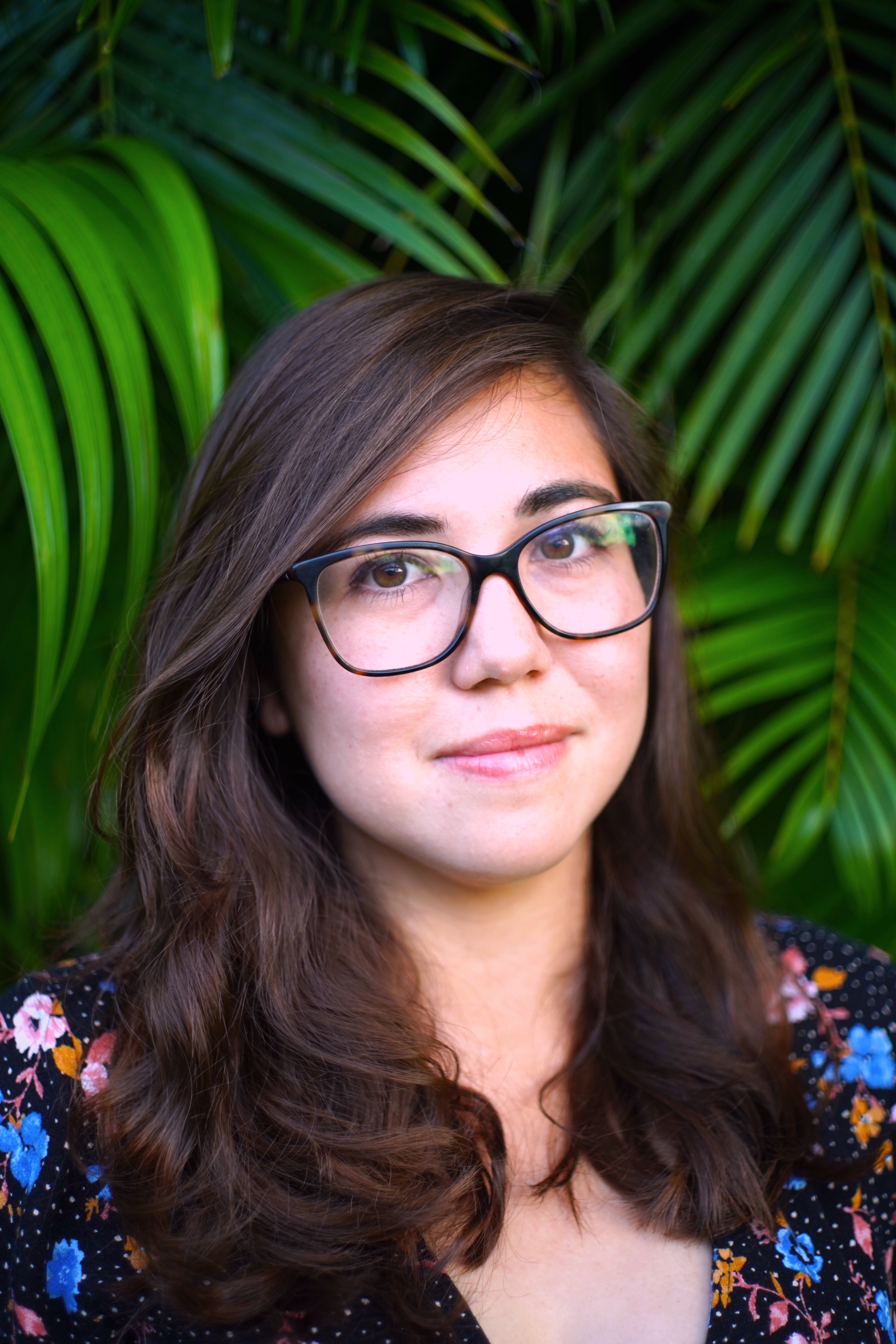
- Born: May 6, 1993 (age 33); Honolulu, Hawai'i
- Education: Kamehameha Schools; Dartmouth College (BA); University of Texas at Austin (MFA)
- Occupation: Author
- Writing career
- Genre: Fiction
- Notable awards: 5 Under 35 Honoree (2026)
- Website: www.megankakimoto.com

Megan Kamalei Kakimoto (born May 6, 1993) is a Japanese and Kanaka Maoli author. She is the author of the story collection Every Drop Is a Man's Nightmare. She was named a 2026 "5 Under 35" Honoree by the National Book Foundation.

== Education ==
Kakimoto graduated from Kamehameha Schools in Honolulu, Hawai'i. She earned a BA in English from Dartmouth College and an MFA in Fiction from the Michener Center for Writers at The University of Texas at Austin.

== Career ==
Her fiction has been featured in Granta, Conjunctions, Joyland, Electric Literature, Black Warrior Review, Boulevard, Southern Humanities Review, and more. She has had essays published in The Guardian, Literary Hub, and elsewhere. Her work has been called "a reset for Hawai‘i literature" in Honolulu Magazine.

Kakimoto's debut story collection, Every Drop Is a Man's Nightmare, was an instant USA Today National Bestseller, named an Indies Introduce title and a September Indie Next pick by the American Booksellers Association, and a "Best Book of 2023" by Powells Books. The collection consists of eleven short stories that interweave Hawaiian mythology and superstition into a surreal contemporary Hawaiian vision.

She is the fiction editor for No Tokens Journal.

Kakimoto is instructor of English at Honolulu Community College, and teaches for Antioch University's MFA Program in Los Angeles. In 2026, she served as the Distinguished Writer in Residence at the University of Hawaiʻi at Mānoa.

== Personal life ==
She lives in Honolulu.

== Awards and honors ==
She was named a 2026 "5 Under 35" Honoree by the National Book Foundation. She was a finalist for the Keene Prize for Literature and has received support from the Rona Jaffe Foundation and the Bread Loaf Writers' Conference. She is the recipient of the 2025 Elliot Cades Award for Literature from the Hawaiʻi Literary Arts Council.

== Bibliography ==
=== Novels ===
- Bloodsick Bloomsbury (forthcoming)

=== Short story collections ===
- Every Drop Is a Man's Nightmare Bloomsbury (2023)

=== Selected stories in literary journals ===
- "Touch Me Like One of Your Island Girls: A Love Story" Granta (Winter 2022)
- "Every Drop Is a Man's Nightmare" Joyland (Spring 2021)
- "Leaving Cynthia" Conjunctions (Spring 2021)
- "Baby's First Lūʻau" Boulevard (Spring 2021)
- "Madwomen" Southern Humanities Review (Winter 2020)
- ""Temporary Dwellers" Qu Literary Magazine (Spring 2019)
