= Clare Sestanovich =

American writer

- Genre: Literary fiction
- Notable awards: National Book Foundation's 5 Under 35

Clare Sestanovich is an American writer.

She was selected as one of the National Book Foundation's 5 Under 35 honorees by Anthony Doerr, for her 2022 short-story collection Objects of Desire. Her debut novel, Ask Me Again, was published by Alfred A. Knopf in 2024.

== Career ==
In the fall of 2024, Sestanovich was an adjunct assistant professor of creative writing at Columbia University School of the Arts.

=== Objects of Desire (2022) ===
Sestanovich's debut collection of short stories, Objects of Desire, was published in June 2021 by Knopf.

=== Ask Me Again (2024) ===
Sestanovich's debut novel, Ask Me Again, was published in June 2024, also by Knopf.

== Works ==
- Objects of Desire (2022)
- Ask Me Again (2024)
