= Jenn Alandy Trahan =

American short story writer

Jenn Alandy Trahan is an American short story writer. Her work has appeared in Harper's Magazine, One Story, and other publications. A former Stegner Fellow, Trahan has taught for several years as a Jones Lecturer at Stanford University.

== Early life ==
Trahan was born in Houston, Texas and raised in Vallejo, California. She was the first in her family to go to college and attended the University of California, Irvine, graduating with a Bachelor of Arts in English. In 2015, Trahan graduated from McNeese State University with an MA in English and MFA in Creative Writing.

== Career ==
Trahan's short story "They Told Us Not To Say This" was published in Harper's Magazine in September of 2018 and was subsequently selected for The Best American Short Stories 2019. It was also included on a recommendation list in Electric Literature. Her short story "The Freak Winds Up Again" was published by One Story in November of 2020 and recommended by The Paris Review.

From 2016 to 2018, Trahan received a Stegner Fellowship, after which she was hired by Stanford University to be a Jones Lecturer. There, she taught classes in fiction, nonfiction, creative expression, and service learning, as well as open workshops for its Writer's Studio program.

In 2020, Trahan was a Writing Downtown fellow, attending a month-long residency near The Writer's Block in Downtown Las Vegas. She also became an alumnus of the Gullkistan Center for Creativity in Iceland the same year.

In 2023, Trahan was selected to be a 2024 Writer in Residency at the Edith Wharton-Straw Dog Writers Guild program at The Mount. At the 2024 AWP conference in Kansas City, Missouri, Trahan was on an Asian Pacific Islander American writers panel with Gina Chung, Jean Kyoung Frazier, Mark Galarrita, and Gene Kwak.

== Personal life ==
An instructor at Stanford University, Trahan is based in Palo Alto, California where she lives with her spouse, daughter, and two dogs.
