= Israela Margalit =

- ישראלה מרגלית
- Born: 1944 (age 81–82); Haifa, Israel
- Education: Hareali, Haifa; Tel-Aviv Academy of Music; Musikhochschule, Munich; Case Western University
- Children: Ilann Maazel; Fiona Maazel
- Writing career
- Notable works: 'CD recording EMI: The 20th Century Anglo-American Chamber Music Series"-Copland, Barbar, Ives, Korngold (Winner Best CD, The British Music Industry Awards,) Delius, Elgar, Walton, Israela Margalit Piano with the soloists of the New York Philharmonic Orchestra and the London Symphony Orchestra. Chandos: Schumann Piano Concerto, Saint-Seans Piano Concerto No 2 with the London Philharmonic Orchestra, Brahms Concerto No 1 and Mendellson Cappriccio Brilliant with the London Symphony Orchestra; Koch: Shostakovich Piano Concerto No 1, and Schnittke Piano Concerto No 2 with the Moscow Philharmonic Orchestra; Grieg Lyrical Pieces for piano solo. Black Box: Rachmaninoff Piano Concerto No 2 with the London Symphony Orchestra. Telarc: Chausson Concerto for violin, piano and a string Quartet with Lorin Maazel Violin, and the soloists of the Cleveland Orchestra. UCJ: Brahms works for 4 hands with Ilann Margalit Maazel. Quartz: Chopin Nocturnes. Chandos: Beethoven Piano Sonatas; Liszt Piano Works. TV Specials: PBS/Transtel/Deutsche Welle: "The Well-Tempered Bach with Peter Ustinov", "The Immortal Beethoven with Peter Ustinov", "Seeking Mozart with Peter Ustinov", "Celebrating Haydn with Sir Peter Ustinov", 2-hour specials with Sir Peter Ustinov, Israela Margalit writer, pianist, (PRIMETIME EMMY nomination; 2 NEA Media Awards, Gold Medal, NY TV and Videos International Festival. Arts & Entertainment: "BEETHOVEN, the prodigy, the titan," Israela Margalit writer, pianist, produced by Curtis Davis. Moonlight Productions: "Music and Tyranny", Israela Margalit producer, writer, director, pianist, Prize winner B\Globe, and Accolades Global Film Music Competition' semi-finalist Brooklyn Shorts Film Awards. Stage plays: "What Kind of Woman" a psychological drama, Winner Best Stage Play New York Script Awards, and Oxford Script Awards; Finalist Bath Scriptwriters & co International Festival, Official Selection Chicago Script Awards; "Forbidden" (Trio), a drama, Best Play, Best Scripts Awards – Londonk London Independent Story Prize, London International Screenplays & Film Festival, LISFF (Productions Moscow, St. Petersburg Russia; Hungary Festival of Theaters, Los Angeles.) "Screwed" a play with music, book and lyrics (a comedy), Israela Margalit, music Oran Eldor, Prize winner Lyrics/Songwriting, Global Music Awards; "First Prize" a drama wrapped in humor, Finalist Oxford Script Awards, Nominated We Script Competition Film Festival, Official Selection the Pasadena International Film Festival; "Night Blooming Jasmine" a drama, Best Stage Play Oxford Script Awards (Productions Tribecca Playhouse, Under St. Marks, New York City). Screenplays: "Calling Card" a thriller, Winner Best Thriller Screenplay, Festigious International Film Festival LA, Official Selection Los Angeles Film Awards, New York Independent Cinema Awards, Thriller/Suspense Festival, California Indies, Scriptmatix. "What Kind of Woman" winner Best Screenplay The New York Film Awards, Paris Independent Film Festival, and Vegas Movie Awards; Finalist Cambridge Script Festival, Semi Finalist Dublin Movie Awards, Nominee Best Original Script Cannes World Film Festival, Official Selection Berlin Independent Art Film Festival (Best Experimental), Toronto International Women Film Festival, London Filmmakers Awards, Manchester Film Festival, Edinburgh Film Awards, Feedback Female Festival, Tokyo Film & Screenplays Awards, Dublin Movie Awards. "SCREWED", Finalist Austin Comedy Film Festival, Portland Comedy Film Festival, Houston Comedy Film Festival, Cambridge Script Festival, Nominated Maverick Movie Awards, London; Official Selection Oxford Script Awards UK, Georgia Comedy Film Festival, Nashville Film Festival, Golden Swan Festival Zurich Best Author, and Best Screenplay, Big Apple Film Festival Screenplay Competition. "First Prize", Runner Up the 16th Annual Williamsburg International Film & Music Competition, Official selection Nashville Independent Filmmakers Festival, Art Film Spirit Awards. "Night Blooming Jasmine", Special Jury Remi Award WorldFest Houston 55. Honorable Mention Best Screenplay FilmCon Awards, LA, Award Screenplay Contest Filmmakers Connect Awards, Finalist - Vancouver Independent Film Festival; Official selection Florida Script Challenge, Big Apple Film and Screenplay Competition, Lebanese Independent Film Festival, LIFF London Lift-Off Film Festival. Short Screenplays: "On the Bench", Winner Best Screenplay Vienna Film Festival; Official Selections, Dublin World Film Festival, Kerry International Film Festival, Manhattan Short Film Festival, Venice Shorts California, Santa Barbara International Screenplay Awards. "Let's go to the Videotape" based on a story by Fiona Maazel, Winner Best Screenplay New York Short Awards; Award Winner Indie Short Fest LA, Toronto Indie Shorts, Dubai Independent Film Festival. [2] 2011, Ted Merwin, The Jewish Week, Sour Notes: Concert pianist-turned-playwright Israela Margalit looks at cutthroat world of classical music in ‘First Prize.’, Accessed 14 June 2014, "..the distinguished Israeli pianist and playwright Israela Margalit suggests ... the classical music world is also saturated with much that is sordid and soul-destroying..."</ref> (1969-19??); Paul Rauch (19??-2012; his death)
- Notable awards: Emmy nomination Honorary Mention Best Play; NY Film & TV festival gold medal NEA Media Awards; British Music Industry award, Best CD (Korngold)

Israela Margalit (Hebrew: ישראלה מרגלית) is an American concert pianist, recording artist, playwright and television writer.

== Career ==
=== Musical career ===
Israela Margalit is a concert pianist and recording artist, a playwright, screenwriter, TV writer and author. Her plays have been produced in New York, Moscow, Los Angeles and Hungary. Her TV specials have been shown on PBS, ZDF, ARD and in more than twenty countries.

She has appeared as a soloist of many of the world's leading orchestras including the Berlin, Munich, London, and Israel Philharmonics and the American Big Five.

== Personal life ==
Israela Margalit is a mother of two from her marriage to conductor Lorin Maazel: Ilann Margalit Maazel, a civil rights lawyer, pianist and composer, and Fiona Maazel, a novelist. She studied music in Tel-Aviv, Paris and Munich. While she was taking a few years' sabbatical from performing to care for her small children, she studied philosophy, political science and literature at Case Western Reserve. She is a recipient of an Honorary Doctorate for Humane Letters from Lake Erie College. She speaks Hebrew, English, French and German, and writes in English. She was born in Palestine in 1944, and lives in New York.
