= Ask Me Again (novel) =

2024 novel by Clare Sestanovich

- Author: Clare Sestanovich
- Language: English
- Genre: Literary fiction, bildungsroman
- Publisher: Alfred A. Knopf
- Publication date: June 11, 2024
- Publication place: United States
- Pages: 303
- ISBN: 9780593318119 (hardcover)
- Dewey Decimal: 813/.6
- LC Class: PS3619.E83 A94 2024

Ask Me Again is a 2024 coming-of-age novel by American author Clare Sestanovich. It is her debut novel and was published by Knopf Publishing Group.

== Plot ==
Eva, a precocious 16-year-old girl from a middle-class south Brooklyn family, befriends Jamie, a teenage boy from a wealthy Upper Manhattan family. As they enter young adulthood, Eva pursues education and a career, while Jamie becomes involved in radical politics.

== Reception ==
In The Guardian, Jonathan Lee praised the novel, writing that "a good coming-of-age novel knows that individuals, like their countries, never really stop coming of age". Ariella Garmaise of The Washington Post also favorably reviewed Ask Me Again, arguing "if Sestanovich’s thematic ambitions are broad — the meaning of life, the coherence of identity, the possibility of principles — her language is cuttingly precise".

Andrew Martin, in The New York Times Book Review, was more mixed on Ask Me Again, writing that "on the scale of a novel, [Sestanovich]'s hesitancy becomes unsatisfying".
