= Halle Butler =

American author (born 1985)

Halle Butler (born 1985) is an American author. She grew up in Bloomington, Illinois and lives in Chicago. After co-writing two independent films, Butler published her first novel, Jillian, in 2015. Her second novel, The New Me, was released in 2019. In 2017, Butler was recognised as one of Granta’s Best of Young American Novelists and honored as one of the National Book Foundation's 5 Under 35.

== Early life and education ==
Originally from Bloomington, Illinois, Butler graduated with a BFA from the School of the Art Institute of Chicago in 2008. As of 2017, Butler was living in Chicago.

== Career ==
Whilst working in a succession of menial jobs, Halle Butler co-wrote two independent films, Crimes against Humanity (2014) and Neighborhood Food Drive (2017).

She released her first novel Jillian in 2015. The plot concerns the obsession of 24-year-old Megan with her 35-year-old co-worker Jillian.

Butler published her second novel The New Me in 2019. It follows a temporary worker called Millie as she goes from job to job. Writing in The Guardian, Rhiannon Lucy Cosslett called it "depressing" and "bleakly funny". Writing for The New Yorker, Jia Tolentino described it as a "definitive work of millennial literature".

Her latest novel, Banal Nightmare, was published in 2024. It follows a 30-something woman who, after a breakup in Chicago, returns to her midwestern hometown.

== Published works ==
- Jillian, Curbside Splendor, 2015. ISBN 978-1940430294
- The New Me, Penguin Books, 2019. ISBN 978-1474612296
- Banal Nightmare, Random House, 2024. ISBN 9780593730355

== Awards and honors ==
- Granta’s Best of Young American Novelists of 2017
- National Book Foundation 5 Under 35 Honoree
