= Lori Ostlund =

American writer

- Education: Minnesota State University Moorhead, University of New Mexico
- Writing career
- Genre: Short story fiction
- Notable awards: Flannery O'Connor Award for Short Fiction

Lori Ostlund (born March 13, 1965) is an American short story writer and novelist. She is the author of two story collections, The Bigness of the World (2009) and Are You Happy? (2025), and the novel After the Parade (2015).

== Early life and education ==
She grew up in a town of 400 people in central Minnesota, where her parents owned a hardware store. She graduated from Minnesota State University Moorhead and from the University of New Mexico with an M.A.

== Career ==
Since 2023, she has been the series editor of the Flannery O'Connor Award for Short Fiction, an award she has previously won. She has taught ESL and Creative Writing. She currently works as a freelance developmental editor.

Her work has appeared in many journals, including The Georgia Review, New England Review, The Kenyon Review, Prairie Schooner, Bellingham Review, Hobart, and Blue Mesa Review. Her story "All Boy" appeared in The Best American Short Stories 2010 and "Just Another Family" appeared in The Best American Short Stories 2024. She has also received an O. Henry Award.

== Personal life ==
She has lived in New Mexico, Spain, Malaysia, North Carolina, and California. She met her wife, the writer Anne Raeff, in New Mexico in 1989, and they have lived in San Francisco, starting 2005.

== Awards ==
| Year | Work | Award | Category | Result | Ref. |
|---|---|---|---|---|---|
| 2009 | The Bigness of the World | California Book Award | First Fiction | Won | |
| 2009 | The Bigness of the World | Flannery O'Connor Award for Short Fiction | — | Won | |
| 2009 | The Bigness of the World | Rona Jaffe Foundation Writers' Award | Fiction | Won | |
| 2010 | The Bigness of the World | Edmund White Award | — | Won | |
| 2010 | The Bigness of the World | Frank O'Connor International Short Story Award | — | Longlisted | |
| 2010 | The Bigness of the World | Lambda Literary Award | Lesbian Debut Fiction | Finalist | |
| 2010 | The Bigness of the World | William Saroyan International Prize for Writing | Fiction | Shortlisted | |
| 2015 | After the Parade | Center for Fiction First Novel Prize | — | Finalist | |
| 2016 | After the Parade | Ferro-Grumley Award | — | Finalist | |
| 2017 | After the Parade | Simpson Family Literary Prize | — | Shortlisted | |

== Selected works ==
=== Novel ===
- —— (2015). After the Parade (hardcover 1st ed.). Scribner. ISBN 9781476790107.

=== Collections ===
- —— (2009). The Bigness of the World (hardcover 1st ed.). University of Georgia Press. ISBN 9780820334097.
- —— (2025). Are You Happy? (hardcover 1st ed.). Astra House. ISBN 9781662603020.

=== Short stories ===
- "Just Another Family", New England Review (Fall 2023); chosen for The Best American Short Stories 2024 (Lauren Groff, guest ed; Heidi Pitlor, series ed)
- "The Bus Driver", STORY (Spring 2023); republished in We Can See into Another Place: Mile-High Writers on Social Justice (Bower House Press, 2024)
- "Are You Happy?", Colorado Review (Summer 2019)
- "A Little Customer Service", ZYZZYVA (Fall 2016); republished in LitHub; included on list of Other Distinguished Stories in The Best American Short Stories 2017
- "The Sunday Rumpus Interview: Anne Raeff" (September 18, 2016). Interviewed Anne Raeff, Flannery O'Connor recipient.
- "The Vice" (novel excerpt), At Length (Sept 2015)
- "Passing through Needles" (novel excerpt), Colorado Review (Summer 2015)
- "Leaving Walter" (novel excerpt), The Common (Spring 2015)
- "The Peeping Toms", The Kenyon Review (Fall 2014)
- "The Gap Year", The Southern Review (Fall 2013); included on list of Other Distinguished Stories in The Best American Short Stories 2014; reprinted in New Stories from the Midwest (2016)
- "Clear As Cake", ZYZZYVA (spring 2013)
- "The Lent Boy", The Iowa Review (Fall 2011)
- "Of All Places", This Land Press (flash fiction commissioned for the series Imaginary Oklahoma, August 2011); reprinted in A Voice Was Sounding: Selected Works from This Land Vol. 1 & 2 (This Land Press, 2012); reprinted in Imaginary Oklahoma: 46 Takes on the 46th State (April 2013)
- "Aaron Englund, July 1970", novel excerpt, Nashville Review (summer 2011)
- "The Day You Were Born", New World Writing, 2011
- "The Excursion", novel excerpt, Bluestem, 2011
- "The Knot", The Wordstock 10
- "All Boy", New England Review (2009); Best American Short Stories 2010, edited by Richard Russo and Heidi Pitlor; Port Magazine (UK); Storyville (reprinted in 2012)
- Bed Death," The Kenyon Review (2009); 2011 PEN/O. Henry Prize Stories, edited by Laura Furman
- "The Bigness of the World", Bellingham Review (2009)
- "Talking Fowl with my Father", New England Review (2009)
- "Nobody Walks to the Mennonites", Blue Mesa Review (2007)
- "Upon Completion of Baldness", Hobart (2009)
- "And Down We Went", Five Chapters (2009)
- "Idyllic Little Bali", Prairie Schooner (2009)
- "Dr. Deneau's Punishment", The Georgia Review (2009)
- "The Children Beneath the Seat", New England Review (2006)
- "In Heat" (novel excerpt), Beloit Fiction Journal (2005)
- "Disconnected", Primavera (2005)
- "Tepezcuintle" (novel excerpt), Northwest Review (2004)
- "Becoming Crystal Sterling", American Literary Review (1998)
