= Amanda Coplin =

American novelist

Amanda Coplin is an American novelist. She was born on 1981, in Wenatchee, Washington, and graduated from the University of Oregon and University of Minnesota.

In 2013 Coplin won a Whiting Writer's Award and was named to the National Book Foundation's 5 Under 35.

Coplin's debut novel, The Orchardist was released through HarperCollins on August 21, 2012. The work deals with an orchardist that takes in two pregnant teenage sisters that are fleeing an abusive pimp that enslaved them in his brothel. The book received praise from NPR, the Denver Post, and The Washington Post. The work went on to win the 2013 American Book Award and Washington State Book Award for Fiction.
