= Fiona Maazel =

American novelist (born 1975)

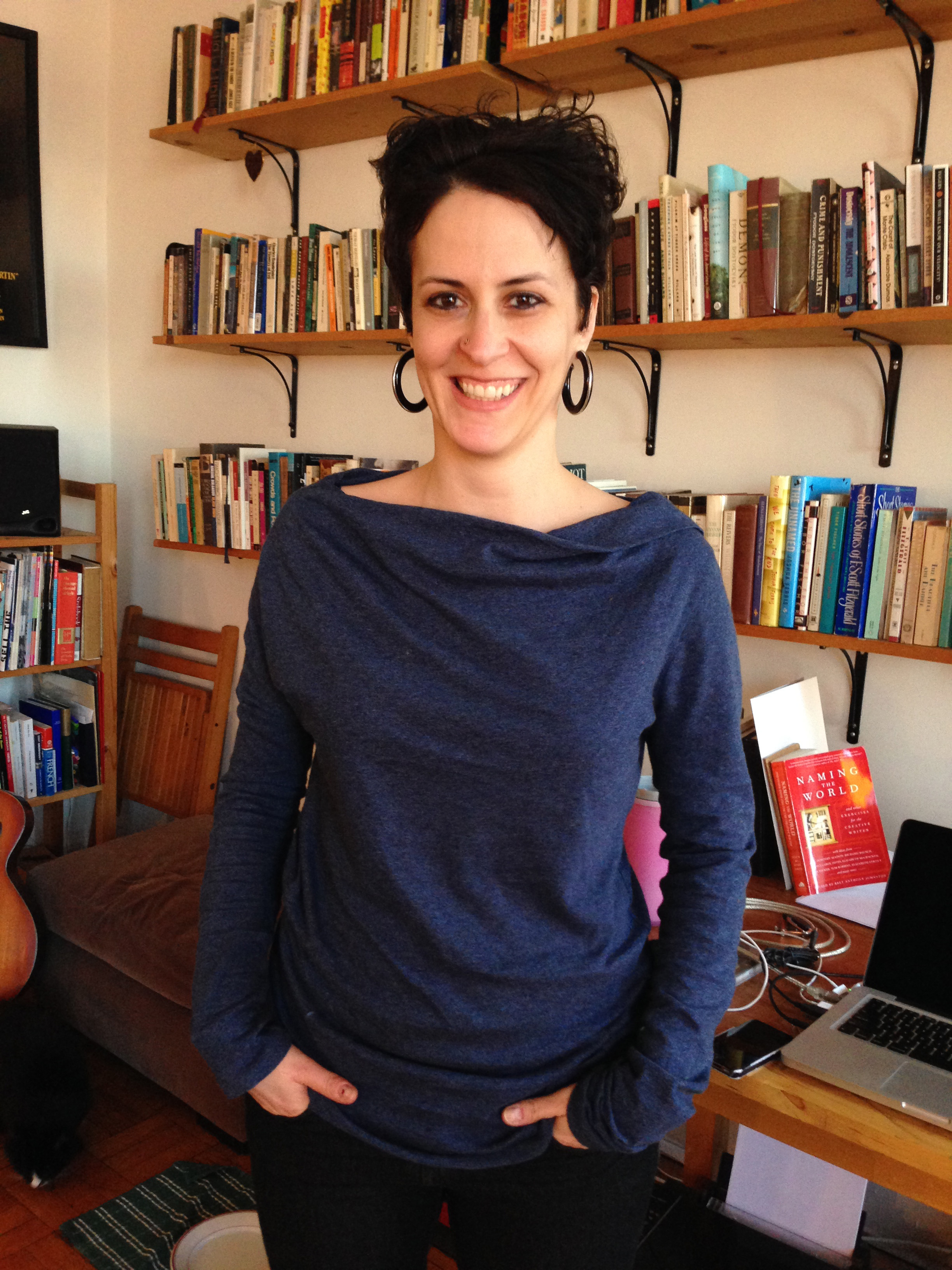
- Fiona Maazel at home
- Born: 1975 (age 50–51); Cleveland, Ohio, U.S.
- Education: Williams College (BA); Bennington College (MFA)
- Occupation: Author
- Writing career
- Genres: fiction, nonfiction
- Notable awards: 5 Under 35 Honoree (2008); Guggenheim Fellowship (2017)

Fiona Maazel (born 1975) is an American author of three novels: Last Last Chance, Woke Up Lonely, and A Little More Human. In 2008, she was named a “5 Under 35” honoree by the National Book Foundation. In 2017, she was awarded a Guggenheim Fellowship.

== Early life and education ==
Maazel was born in Cleveland, Ohio. Her father was conductor Lorin Maazel. Her mother is Israela Margalit, a pianist and scriptwriter. She received a Bachelor of Arts from Williams College in 1997. She earned her Master of Fine Arts from Bennington College in 2002.

== Career ==
Maazel's fiction and non-fiction have appeared in many publications, including Harper's, The New York Times Book Review, The New York Times, Tin House, Bomb, Fence, The Mississippi Review, Conjunctions, The Common, The Yale Review, Anthem, The Village Voice, N+1, This American Life, Selected Shorts, and on Salon.com.

Woke Up Lonely is about a cult leader, his ex-wife, and the four government employees he takes hostage. Last Last Chance tells the story of Lucy Clark, a drug addict with a complicated family and a difficult life. Joshua Henkin of The New York Times said of the book: "Last Last Chance isn’t your average novel, thanks in no small part to Maazel's funny, lacerating prose."

She is a 2008 National Book Foundation "5 Under 35" honoree, winner of the Bard Fiction Prize for 2009, and in 2005 she was awarded a Lannan Literary Fellowship.

She has been the Picador Guest Professor for Literature at the University of Leipzig.

She has taught at Brooklyn College, Columbia University, Princeton University, New York University, and Syracuse University.

She is also the Director of Communications for Measures for Justice.

== Personal life ==
Maazel lives in Brooklyn.

== Works ==
- Last Last Chance New York : Picador/ Farrar, Straus and Giroux, 2008, ISBN 9780312428310, OCLC 243544116
- Woke Up Lonely Minneapolis, Minnesota : Graywolf Press, 2014. ISBN 9781555976729, OCLC 914561269
- A Little More Human Minneapolis, Minnesota: Graywolf Press, 2017, ISBN 9781555977696, OCLC 946693815
