= Anya Ulinich =

American novelist

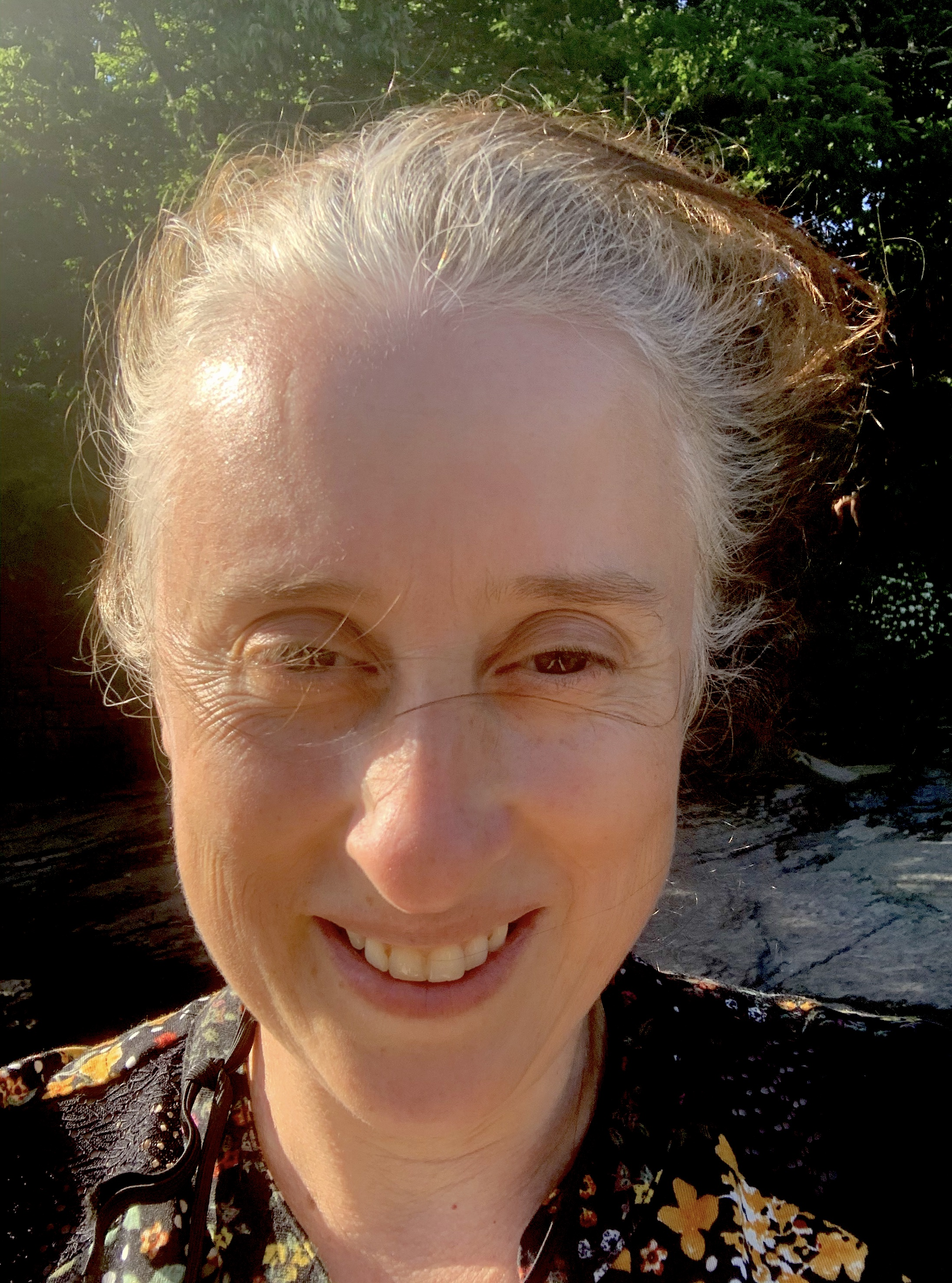
- Born: 1973 (age 52–53); Moscow, USSR
- Occupations: Novelist and artist

Anya Ulinich (born 1973) is a contemporary Russian American writer and visual artist. She is the author of Petropolis (Viking, 2007), and Lena Finkle’s Magic Barrel, a graphic novel (Penguin, 2014).

Petropolis, a Sami Rohr Prize Finalist, presents the American dream as no longer a matter of material success, or even educational opportunities but of “finding a place for one's misfit heart”. Lena Finkle’s Magic Barrel has been described as "a late-life bildungsroman that somehow combines a great Russian heaviness of spirit with invigorating humour, moving effortlessly from Chekhov to OkCupid clichés." Ayelet Waldman's review in the New York Times describes hers as a "rare, indeed magical, talent.”

== Awards ==
- National Book Foundation's 5 Under 35 honoree (2007)

== Selected works ==
- Petropolis (Viking, 2007)
- Lena Finkle's Magic Barrel (Penguin, 2014)
