= Jenny Xie (novelist) =

Chinese-American novelist

- Born: Shanghai, China
- Education: University of California, Berkeley; Johns Hopkins University
- Occupations: Novelist, writer, editor
- Notable work: Holding Pattern
- Awards: National Book Foundation "5 Under 35" (2023)

Jenny Xie is a Chinese-American novelist. In 2023, the National Book Foundation honored her as a "5 Under 35" writer.

Xie was born in Shanghai. She graduated from University of California, Berkeley and received a Master of Fine Arts from the Johns Hopkins University Writing Seminars. She has received a Bread Loaf scholarship and MacDowell Fellowship, and completed residencies with Yaddo, the Virginia Center for the Creative Arts, and Loghaven.

She was an executive editor with Dwell.

Xie has contributed writing to multiple publications, including Apartment Therapy, Architectural Digest, The Atlantic. AGNI, Dwell, Ninth Letter, and Narrative Magazine. Her debut novel, Holding Pattern, was published in 2023.

As of 2023, Xie lived in Brooklyn.

== Publications ==
- Holding Pattern. Penguin. 2023. ISBN 978-0-593-53972-9.
