= Azareen Van der Vliet Oloomi =

Iranian-American writer (born 1983)

- Born: 1983 (age 42–43); Los Angeles, California, U.S.
- Education: University of California, San Diego (BA); Brown University (MFA)
- Occupation: writer
- Writing career
- Notable works: Fra Keeler (2012); Call Me Zebra (2018); Savage Tongues (2021)
- Notable awards: Whiting Award for Fiction (2015); PEN/Faulkner Award for Fiction (2019)
- Website: azareenvandervlietoloomi.com

Azareen Van der Vliet Oloomi (born 1983 in Los Angeles) is an Iranian American writer. She won the 2015 Whiting Award for Fiction and the 2019 PEN/Faulkner Award for Fiction.

== Early life and education ==
Azareen Van der Vliet Oloomi was born in 1983, in Los Angeles, to an Iranian mother and British father. She spent much of her childhood in Iran and Spain but also lived in the United States, Scotland, and the United Arab Emirates. She studied Latin American studies and creative writing at the University of California, San Diego, then completed her Master of Fine Arts in fiction at Brown University. She speaks four languages.

== Career ==
In 2012, Van der Vliet Oloomi published her first novel, Fra Keeler.

In 2015, she was honored as one of the National Book Foundation's 5 Under 35 and won the Whiting Award for Fiction.

Her second book, the unconventional bildungsroman Call Me Zebra, won the 2019 PEN/Faulkner Award for Fiction. According to the judges, the novel "is a library within a library, a Borges-esque labyrinth of references from all cultures and all walks of life". Call Me Zebra also received the John Gardner Award and was longlisted for the PEN Open Book Award.

Her work has appeared in The Paris Review, Granta, Guernica, Bomb, Los Angeles Review of Books and The New York Times, among others. It has been translated into Italian, Turkish, Chinese, Japanese, and Romanian.

In addition to writing, Van der Vliet Oloomi is an associate professor of English at the University of Notre Dame. She also founded "Literatures of Annihilation, Exile & Resistance, a lecture series sponsored by the Kroc Institute for International Peace Studies and the College of Arts and Letters at the University of Notre Dame that brings together Middle Eastern/Southwest Asian and North African writers and artists."

In 2026, Van der Vliet Oloomi was one of five judges on the Translated Literature category of the 77th National Book Awards, the chair of the judges was Christopher Merrill.

== Awards and honors ==
Van der Vliet Oloomi has received fellowships through the Fulbright Program, MacDowell, and Art Omi.

In 2015, the National Book Foundation selected Van der Vliet Oloomi for their annual "5 Under 35" honor.

Over twenty publications named Call Me Zebra one of the best books of 2019.

Her short story "It Is What It Is" was included in The Best American Short Stories 2023.

=== Literary awards ===
Year	Title	Award	Category	Result	Ref.
2015	—	Whiting Award	Fiction	Won	
2019	Call Me Zebra	John Gardner Fiction Book Award	—	Won	
2019	Call Me Zebra	PEN/Faulkner Award for Fiction	—	Won	
2019	Call Me Zebra	PEN Open Book Award	—	Longlisted	

== Publications ==
- Fra Keeler. Dorothy. 2012. ISBN 9780984469345.
- Call Me Zebra. Mariner Books. 2018. ISBN 9780544944602.
- Savage Tongues. Mariner Books. 2021. ISBN 9780358315063.
