= Call Me Zebra =

2018 novel by Azareen Van der Vliet Oloomi

- Author: Azareen Van der Vliet Oloomi
- Publisher: Mariner Books
- Publication date: February 6, 2018
- Awards: PEN/Faulkner Award for Fiction (2019)
- ISBN: 9780544944602

Call Me Zebra is a 2018 novel by Azareen Van der Vliet Oloomi that won the 2019 PEN/Faulkner Award for Fiction.

== Reception ==
Though mostly positive, Call Me Zebra received some mixed reviews from critics. Starred reviews came from Kirkus Reviews and Publishers Weekly.

Kirkus wrote, "This is a brilliant, demented, and bizarro book that demands and rewards all the attention a reader might dare to give it." Publishers Weekly called it "a sharp and genuinely fun picaresque, employing humor and poignancy side-by-side to tell an original and memorable story."

Liesel Shillinger, writing for The New York Times Book Review, compared Call Me Zebra to the works of Roberto Bolaño and Jorge Luis Borges, a comparison that Irina Dumitrescu, writing for the Los Angeles Review of Books, also drew. Shillinger further highlighted how, "with intricacy and humor, Van der Vliet Oloomi relays Zebra’s brainy, benighted struggles as a tragicomic picaresque". Shelf Awareness's Bruce Jacobs also referred to the novel as "picaresque" while also calling is a "rambling" and "wildly imaginative story" that is "as quirky and funny as its rambunctious narrator".

Nathan Scott McNamara, also writing for the Los Angeles Review of Books, called to mind previous works, as well, noting that "what Maggie Nelson’s The Argonauts did for gender and sexuality, Call Me Zebra does for the experience of exile, deftly threading the narrative with theory while also using theory to pull the reader in. Though Call Me Zebra happens to be fiction, both books are stuffed with complex ideas made irresistible and lyric. Both symbiotically use philosophy to clarify and amplify the human story."

The Millions' Nur Nasreen Ibrahim said this "novel about a difficult, funny, and troubled woman is at its heart a novel about the powerful role of literature in self-discovery."

Michael Valinsky, writing for Bomb Magazine, wrote, "Oloomi effectively creates a fictional universe that thrives in its heavy-handedness: readers might get fed up with Zebra’s over-expressive hyper-intellectualism since much of her narration is filled with elegiac diction and hyperbolic discourse. Yet to stop there is to miss the realization that the beauty of Zebra’s character lies in the very fact that literature is hyperbolic."

In a mixed review, The Boston Globe's Laura Collins-Hughes noted that Van der Vliet Oloomi "knows exactly what she’s doing in creating a narrator-protagonist who lives almost entirely in her head [...] The trouble, for the reader, is that this very two-dimensionality makes Zebra seem less a character than a thought experiment infused with literary homages. That impression persists through most of the book’s first 180 pages [...] Oloomi, in her rigor, asks us to inhabit Zebra’s airless, intellectualized existence without the compensations of, say, extraordinary prose or arresting atmospherics. (Those do come later.) It makes for tiresome reading, though it’s relieved whenever Ludo is around, which is not nearly enough in that first chunk of the book".

LA Review of Books' Dumitrescu also noted that "despite its lively prose, the story occasionally drags, as Zebra keeps traveling while never seeming to reach her goal." Unlike Collins-Hughes, however, Dumitrescu concluded that "in denying readers some common pleasures of reading — absorption, escapism, empathy — Van der Vliet Oloomi conveys the cold loneliness of Zebra’s grief all the better."

Booklist also reviewed the novel.

Library Journal's Wendy Galgan reviewed the audiobook edition, saying, "Leila Buck's narration, which brings Zebra's story to life in all its complexity, is a perfect fit."

== Awards and honors ==
Over twenty publications named Call Me Zebra one of the best books of 2019. It won the 2019 PEN/Faulkner Award for Fiction and was longlisted for the PEN Open Book Award.
