= The People of Forever Are Not Afraid =

2012 novel by Shani Boianjiu

- First edition cover
- Author: Shani Boianjiu
- Language: English
- Genre: Literary Fiction
- Publisher: Hogarth Press
- Publication date: September 2012
- Publication place: United States
- Media type: Print (Hardcover)
- Pages: 352
- ISBN: 978-0-307-95595-1

The People of Forever Are Not Afraid is a 2012 novel by the Israeli writer Shani Boianjiu.

== Plot ==
The People of Forever Are Not Afraid tells the story of three young Israeli women - Lea, Avishag and Yael - following them from their high school years in a small northern village, through their enlistment in the Israeli Defence Force where they train marksmen, guard a border and man a checkpoint, and on to their twenties. The book describes the progress of the three women in a series of vignettes.

== Editions ==
- American (hardcover): The People of Forever Are Not Afraid. Hogarth. September 11, 2012. ISBN 978-0-307-95595-1.
- American (paperback): The People of Forever are not Afraid. Random House. 7 February 2013. ISBN 978-1448139637.
- Brazilian: O Povo Eterno não tem Medo. Alfaguara. 2013. ISBN 978-8579622175. Translated by Débora Landsberg.
- Canadian: The People of Forever Are Not Afraid. Anchor. ISBN 978-0385676915.
- Croatian: Vječne ratnice. Znanje. December 3, 2012. ISBN 978-9533246895. Translated by Marta Klepo.
- Czech: Věčný národ se strachy netřese. Jota. ISBN 978-8074623400. Translated by Tomáš Suchomel.
- Danish: Det evige folk har ingen frygt. Gyldenal. September 2013. ISBN 978-8702125764.
- Dutch: Het eeuwige volk kent geen angst. Anthos. January 2013. ISBN 978-9041421036. Translated by Auke Leistra.
- French: Nous faisions semblant d'être quelqu'un d'autre. Robert Laffont. August 2014. ISBN 978-2-221-13138-1. Translated by Annick le Goyat.
- German: Das Volk der Ewigkeit kennt keine Angst. Kiepenheuer & Witsch. 10 September 2013. ISBN 978-3462045581. Translated by Maria Hummitzsch and Ulrich Blumenbach
- Hebrew: עם הנצח לא מפחד. Kinneret Zmora-Bitan. June 2013. ISBN 978-965-552-856-5. Translated by the author.
- Hungarian: Bátraké a mennyország. Libri. ISBN 978-9633101360. Translated by Gitta Tóth.
- Icelandic: Fólkið frá öndverðu óttast ekki. Bjartur |Neon. September 2013. ISBN 978-9935454102. Translated by Jón Hallur Stefánsson.
- Italian: La gente come noi non ha paura. Rizzoli. 1 January 2013. ISBN 978-8817064415. Translated by F. Pedone.
- Korean: 영원의 사람들은 두려워하지 않는다 . November 2013.
- Norwegian: Evighetens folk kjenner ingen frykt. Cappelen Damm. 2013. ISBN 978-8202382506. Translated by Johanne Fronth-Nygren.
- Polish: Naród, który nie zna strachu. Sonia Draga. ISBN 978-8375087185. Translated by Urszula Gardner.
- Portuguese: O povo da eternidade não tem medo. Objectiva. September 2013. ISBN 978-9896721886.
- Romanian: Oamenii eternităţii nu se tem niciodată. Polirom. June 2014. ISBN 978-973-46-3786-7.
- Serbian: Večni narod se ne boji. Laguna. 18 February 2013. ISBN 978-8652111435. Translated by Marko Mladenović.
- Spanish: La gente como nosotros no tiene miedo. Alfaguara. 4 September 2013. ISBN 978-8420414928. Translated by Eugenia Vázquez Nacarino.
- Swedish: Det eviga folket är inte rädda. Natur & Kultur. 20 April 2013. ISBN 978-9127133631. Translated by Erik MacQueen.
- United Kingdom: The People of Forever Are Not Afraid. Hogarth. February 2013. ISBN 978-1781090091.
