= Greg Jackson (writer) =

American writer

Greg Jackson is an American writer. He is best known for his book of short stories Prodigals (2016), for which he was a National Book Foundation's 5 Under 35 honoree and the Bard College Fiction Prize. His debut novel The Dimensions of a Cave came out in 2023. In 2017, Jackson was named one of the best young American novelists by Granta magazine. His fiction and essays have appeared in a wide range of journals, among them The New Yorker, The New York Times, Granta, the Virginia Quarterly Review, the Los Angeles Times, the Los Angeles Review of Books, and The Guardian.
