= What We Lose =

2017 novel by Zinzi Clemmons

- First edition (US)
- Author: Zinzi Clemmons
- Language: English
- Publisher: Viking (US); Fourth Estate (UK)
- Publication date: July 11, 2017
- Pages: 277
- ISBN: 978-1-4328-4641-1

What We Lose is the 2017 debut novel of American author Zinzi Clemmons. It is loosely based on her own experiences caring for her mother who was dying of cancer.

== Background ==
Clemmons was a graduate student in the fiction MFA program at Columbia University, working on a novel, when her mother was diagnosed with breast cancer. She finished her degree but set aside the novel, instead writing journals of her experiences caring for and ultimately grieving her mother's death. These became the basis of a more experimental project than her unfinished linear novel, a fragmentary and chronologically disrupted "exercise in autofiction".

== Plot ==
Thandi, the daughter of a South African mother and an American father, comes of age in Pennsylvania. When she is in college, her mother is stricken by cancer and dies, causing Thandi's life to fall apart as she struggles to process her grief.

Shortly thereafter, Thandi discovers she is pregnant by her boyfriend Peter. She decides to carry the pregnancy to term and has a son she names Mahpee. She and Peter quickly marry and he moves to New York City to be with her and their child. However their marriage quickly falls apart and after she cheats on him, she decides to ask for a separation.

Thandi begins to forget her mother and slowly begins to heal, though she realizes her mother's death will haunt her for the rest of her life.

== Style ==
In The Guardian, Marta Bausells described What We Lose as "highly experimental, told in intimate vignettes including blogposts, photos, hand-drawn charts and hip-hop lyrics". In Vogue, Megan O'Grady notes the book's "boldly innovative and frankly sexual" style, noting "the collage-like novel mixes hand-drawn charts, archival photographs, rap lyrics, sharp disquisitions on the Mandelas and Oscar Pistorius, and singular meditations on racism’s brutal intimacies." O'Grady compared Clemmons to authors like Karl Ove Knausgaard, Meghan O’Rourke, and Claudia Rankine.

Clemmons cites Toni Morrison's 1970 first novel The Bluest Eye as a significant influence for What We Lose.

== Reception ==
What We Lose received overwhelmingly positive reviews. The New York Times review said: "The book’s distinctive form and voice give it an unusual capacity to show how individuals connect deep feeling to broad political understanding — an experience too rarely rendered in fiction." The Guardian called "a debut of haunting fragments". The Telegraph praised it as an "Intelligently and impressively conceived, and beautifully told" novel.

Awards for What We Lose
Year	Award	Result	Ref.
2018	Hurston/Wright Legacy Award for Debut Novel	Finalist	
2018	Andrew Carnegie Medal for Fiction	Longlist	
2017	Goodreads Choice Award for Debut Goodreads Author	Finalist	
2018	Aspen Words Literary Prize	Shortlist	
