= How Much of These Hills Is Gold =

2020 novel by C Pam Zhang

- First edition cover
- Author: C Pam Zhang
- Language: English
- Publisher: Riverhead Books
- Publication date: April 7, 2020 (1st ed.)
- Publication place: United States
- Pages: 288
- ISBN: 978-0525537205
- OCLC: 1085621460
- Dewey Decimal: 813/.6
- LC Class: PS3626.H35 H69 2020

How Much of These Hills Is Gold is a 2020 debut novel by American author C Pam Zhang. It was longlisted for the Booker Prize and won the Asian/Pacific American Award for Literature for Adult Fiction. The book was published by Riverhead Books in North America and by Virago Press in the United Kingdom and Commonwealth.

== Development and writing ==
Zhang began the novel after waking up with the opening sentence in her head. She did not originally intend to write a novel, and after completing the first chapter, Zhang stopped working on the project for a period of time. The novel takes place in the American West, a setting explored in novels Zhang read when young, including East of Eden, Lonesome Dove, and Little House on the Prairie. The first chapter was written without conducting research, as Zhang did not want research to "stifle" her writing.

Though this novel was the first published by Zhang, she says that she has another "drawer" novel "that will never see the light of day".

== Reception ==
=== Reviews ===
How Much of These Hills is Gold received reviews from Kirkus, Library Journal,The New York Times Book Review, and many other publications.

Critics highlighted the lyrical quality of Zhang's writing. In his review of the book for The Irish Times, Oliver Farry wrote that the book's prose was "reminiscent" of authors Cormac McCarthy and Toni Morrison. Alexis Burling, writing for the San Francisco Chronicle, called the author's prose "exquisitely crafted," saying that "Zhang captures not only the mesmeric beauty and storied history of America’s sacred landscape, but also the harsh sacrifices countless people were forced to make in hopes of laying claim to its bounty." Kirkus called the book "[a]esthetically arresting and a vital contribution to America’s conversation about itself."

NPR's Annalisa Quinn provided a mixed review, stating, "Zhang's style can be densely, airlessly lovely. Self-conscious lyricism fills the page like all that California dust, sometimes making it hard to breathe." The Asian Review of Books also proffered a mixed review.

The audiobook, narrated by Catherine Ho and Joel de la Fuente, received a starred review from Booklist's Jane Philbrick, who stated, "The discrimination the family experiences brings an almost constant feeling of danger; Ho leans into its menace by emphasizing slurs, threats, or speeding through the adrenaline of violence. De la Fuente['s] ... tired drawl reflects that history’s toll. "

The New York Times listed Zhang's novel as one of "100 Notable Books of 2020." Barack Obama listed the novel as one of his favorite books of 2020.

Kirkus and NPR named How Much of These Hills is Gold one of the best books of 2020.

=== Awards ===
Year	Awards	Category	Result	Ref.
2020	Booker Prize	—	Longlisted	
2020	Booklist Best First Novels on Audio	—	Top 10	
2020	California Book Award	First Fiction (Gold)	Won	
2020	Center for Fiction First Novel Prize	—	Shortlisted	
2020	Goodreads Choice Award	Debut Novel	Nominated	
2020	Reading Women Award	Fiction	Nominated	
2021	American Academy of Arts and Letters Rosenthal Family Foundation Award	—	Won	
2021	Asian/Pacific American Award for Literature	Adult Fiction	Won	
2021	Lambda Literary Award	Bisexual Fiction	Finalist	
2021	National Book Critics Circle Award	John Leonard Prize	Shortlisted	
2021	PEN/Hemingway Award	—	Shortlisted	
2021	Young Lions Fiction Award	—	Finalist	

== Film adaptation ==
In June 2025, Ang Lee was announced to direct a film adaptation of the novel entitled Old Gold Mountain for Fifth Season. Chang-Rae Lee has written the screenplay. The film will begin shooting in spring 2026 at northern California. A cast was announced in May 2026 before filming began, which included Zine Tseng and Owen Teague.
