= Claire Luchette =

American author

Claire Luchette is an American author. They published their first novel, Agatha of Little Neon, in 2021, a book featuring Sisters of the Catholic church. Luchette was honored with a "5 under 35" designation by the National Book Foundation in 2021 and was a 2020 National Endowment for the Arts Fellow and a 2020 James Merrill House Fellow in Stonington, CT. Before publishing their first novel, Luchette's short story "New Bees" won a 2020 Pushcart Prize. They are the recipient of the 2025 Whiting Award in Fiction.

Luchette attended Brown University as an undergraduate where they studied English. Later, Luchette received a Master of Fine Arts degree from the University of Oregon. They are a Chicago native and currently live in New York.

== Published works ==
=== Novels ===
- Agatha of Little Neon. New York: Farrar, Straus and Giroux. 2021. ISBN 978-0-374-26526-7.
