= Ecotone (magazine) =

American literary journal

- Editor-in-chief: David Gessner
- Categories: Literary magazine
- Frequency: Biannual
- Circulation: 2,500 to 5,000
- Publisher: Emily Louise Smith
- Founded: 2005
- Company: University of North Carolina Wilmington
- Country: USA
- Based in: Wilmington, North Carolina
- Language: English
- Website: ecotonemagazine.org
- ISSN: 1553-1775 (print); 2165-2651 (web)

Ecotone is an American literary magazine established in 2005 at the University of North Carolina Wilmington by David Gessner, Kimi Faxon Hemingway, and Heather Wilson. It is based at the Department of Creative Writing and produced by faculty and students in the Master of Fine Arts program at the university. The magazine publishes two issues per year, focussing on different aspects of place-based writing and art. Each issue endeavors to bring together ""the literary and scientific, the personal and biological, the urban and rural." Issues include fiction, non-fiction, poetry, and comics.

The magazine has received numerous grants from the National Endowment for the Arts.

== Reception ==
Works published in the magazine have been chosen for inclusion in anthologies, such as the Pushcart Prize, The Best American Short Stories 2008, The Best American Short Stories 2019, The Best American Short Stories 2022, as well as The Best American Poetry and The Best American Essays.

In 2014 an anthology of selections from the magazine's first ten years was published by Lookout Books.

=== Awards and honors ===
- 2023 Firecracker Award, winner in the category Magazines/General Excellence
- 2022 AWP Small Press Publisher Award, Winner
- 2020 AWP Small Press Publisher Award, Finalist
