= Antonia Angress =

American novelist

Antonia Angress is an American novelist. Her first novel, Sirens and Muses, was published in 2022 by Ballantine Books. Antonia was the recipient of a 2024 National Endowment for the Arts Fellowship in Creative Writing.

She studied at Brown University for a BA in literature, with Ottessa Moshfegh, and at University of Minnesota for an MFA in fiction.

== Works ==
- Sirens & Muses. 2022.
