= Hangman (novel) =

2023 novel by Maya Binyam

- Author: Maya Binyam
- Language: English
- Publication date: 2023

Hangman is a 2023 debut novel by the American writer Maya Binyam. It was published by Macmillan. The novel is a surreal story about an exile returning home to Sub-Saharan Africa to visit his sick brother. It explores the themes of empathy, foreign aid, social responsibility, hospitality, and injustice.

== Reception ==
For Hangman, Binyam received the National Book Foundation 5 Under 35 Award, the Bard Fiction Prize, the Rosenthal Family Foundation Award, the 2025 Women's Prize for Fiction longlist, and the Dublin Literary Award. The novel was reviewed by The New York Times, The New Yorker, and The Guardian.
