= Agatha of Little Neon =

2021 literary fiction novel by Claire Luchette

- Author: Claire Luchette
- Language: English
- Genre: Literary fiction
- Publisher: Farrar, Straus and Giroux
- Publication date: August 3, 2021
- Publication place: United States
- Pages: 288
- ISBN: 978-0-374-26526-7
- OCLC: 1240264841

Agatha of Little Neon is a 2021 literary fiction novel by American author Claire Luchette. Agatha of Little Neon was praised upon its debut and was included in several best of 2021 lists.

== Plot summary ==
Agatha of Little Neon features Agatha, a sister of the Catholic Church, in 2005. Agatha entered the convent seven years earlier, after the death of her mother. She has become inseparable from three other young sisters—Frances, Mary Lucille, and Therese—who took their vows at the same time, and they are all devoted to their Mother Roberta.

At the beginning of the novel, Agatha and her three sisters are all 29 years old. They have spent much of their 20s working at their church in Lackawanna, New York, and running a daycare center. When the parish goes broke, the four sisters are transferred to Woonsocket, Rhode Island, where they are in charge of a halfway house. The house is "the color of Mountain Dew" which prompts the nickname "Little Neon".

At the halfway house, they care for a small group of broken, lost, and healing adults, including Tim Gary and Lawnmower Jill. During the day, Agatha is sent to teach geometry at a local Catholic girls' high school.

For her entire adult life, her three sisters have been her family, and the church her home. But as Agatha forges new relationships in the halfway house and at the school, and as the Catholic Church sexual abuse scandal grows, she begins to question her religion and her identity. By the end of Agatha of Little Neon, Agatha comes of age and forges a new path for herself.

== Reception ==
Vogue and The A.V. Club both included the novel in their "best of 2021" book lists, and Vogue additionally placed it in their monthly list of best books in August 2021. NPR featured Agatha of Little Neon as their book of the day for December 23, 2021.

In individual reviews, Kirkus Reviews called Agatha of Little Neon "a charming and incisive debut" from Luchette. While the Chicago Review of Books lightly chastised the novel for being "too spartan and easily accessible a novel" for some individuals, they praised it for reaching "that goal which all novels fundamentally pursue—saying something authentic and essential about the human experience—and [doing] so with verisimilitude and the grace that comes with living simply." The Star Tribune lauded Luchette's work, writing that Luchette "develops every person so fully, so effectively, that even those who briefly cross the page are memorable." Indeed, NPR praised Agatha of Little Neon's adherence to the show, don't tell writing principle.

Additional positive reviews were published by Publishers Weekly, The New York Times Book Review, Booklist, America, and Refinery29.

== See also ==
- Matrix (Groff novel), a nun-focused novel published around the same time as Agatha of Little Neon
