= The Orchardist =

2012 novel by Amanda Coplin

- First edition
- Author: Amanda Coplin
- Language: English
- Genre: Fiction
- Publisher: HarperCollins
- Publication place: United States
- Pages: 448
- ISBN: 978-0-06-218852-6
- OCLC: 898064848

The Orchardist (2012) is a novel by American author Amanda Coplin set in the Pacific Northwest at the turn of the 20th century.

== Synopsis ==
Haunted by the disappearance of his younger sister forty years earlier, William Talmadge has taken refuge in the careful tending of his isolated apple orchard. His solitary life is shared only with the local midwife, Caroline Middey, and Clee, a Nez Perce horseman and childhood friend. Then two half-wild, starving and very pregnant teen-aged girls arrive. They are Jane and Della, sisters who have escaped the abuse of a brothel and its proprietor Michaelsen. Curious, but respectful of their wariness, Talmadge patiently cultivates their trust and creates a haven for them among his trees. A series of tragedies leaves Jane's baby daughter, Angelene, in Talmadge's care and sets Della on a lifelong journey to reconcile her own demons.

== Awards ==
- 2013 American Book Award
- 2013 Washington State Book Award for Fiction
- 2012 Barnes & Noble Discover Award

== Bibliography ==
- Amanda Coplin (August 21, 2012). The Orchardist. HarperCollins. ISBN 978-0-06-218852-6.
