= Holding Pattern (novel) =

Novel by Jenny Xie

- Author: Jenny Xie
- Audio read by: Annie Q.
- Language: English
- Genre: Literary fiction
- Publisher: Riverhead Books
- Publication date: June 20, 2023
- Publication place: United States
- ISBN: 9780593539705

Holding Pattern is a 2023 debut novel written by Jenny Xie. The novel explores themes of immigration, belonging, mother-daughter relationships, and the diverse ways people learn to support one another.

== Plot ==
Holding Pattern follows 28-year-old Kathleen Cheng, a doctoral student who drops out of school and moves back home after her engagement breaks. Her mother, Marissa, immigrated from China and has a surprising new love interest. As Kathleen gets involved in helping her mother plan her wedding to a tech entrepreneur, she also takes on a job at an unconventional start-up. Throughout this process, Kathleen and Marissa explore their shared history, leading to a profound understanding of how they can support each other in their personal growth while also recognizing the obstacles that unknowingly held them back in their relationship.

== Critical reception ==
NPR's Manuela López Restrepo highlighted how "the novel touches on the commodification of intimacy, when Kathleen takes work as a professional cuddler, and the cultural boundaries that make her mother hesitant to accept this line of work."

Tammy Tarng, writing for The New York Times Book Review, called the novel "exquisite and wise" while Publishers Weekly referred to it as "funny and sharp".

Kirkus Reviews called the novel "an engaging and heartwarming story," writing, "Xie is a deft chronicler of the ways power shifts between people. What emerges is a novel offering a lucid examination of a range of relationships: those between a mother and daughter, old friends, and more passing acquaintances".

Booklist's Sabrina Szos similarly highlighted how Holding Pattern "is full of mother-daughter emotions and beautiful moments of love and light".

Sarah Neilson, writing for Shondaland, said, "Xie is a brilliant writer, taking the reader inside Kathleen’s world while also exploring the notion of identity and home in late-stage capitalist America". Neilson further noted that the "characters are hard not to get attached to". Alta's Eva Recinos further noted that "Xie crafts a complex mother-daughter relationship, exploring the muddiness of care and connection between two very different people."

Booklist also reviewed the audiobook narrated by Annie Q.
