= Objects of Desire (short story collection) =

2021 debut short story collection by Clare Sestanovich

Objects of Desire: Stories
- Author: Clare Sestanovich
- Publisher: Knopf
- Publication date: June 29, 2021
- Pages: 224
- ISBN: 978-0593318096

Objects of Desire is a 2021 debut short story collection by New Yorker editor Clare Sestanovich. With eleven stories total, mainly concerning the lives of women, the book was published by Knopf.

== Stories ==
Title	Original publication
"Annunciation"	Harper's Magazine
"By Design"	The Paris Review
"Terms of Agreement"	
"Objects of Desire"	
"Old Hope"	The New Yorker
"Security Questions"	
"Make Believe"	
"Wants and Needs"	
"Brenda"	
"Now You Know"	
"Separation"	

== Critical reception ==
Publishers Weekly called the book "intelligent" and with "a gift for pithy detail that encapsulates the whole of a character's personality or era of lived experience," ultimately lauding Sestanovich's control and demonstration of language. Kirkus Reviews called Sestanovich a "taciturn" writer with "images and sentences of delicate beauty" albeit with the caveat that her writing left "much, perhaps too much, unspoken." Entertainment Weekly gave the book an A grade, stating that Sestanovich wrote with "a kind of bracing cold-plunge clarity."

Chicago Review of Books noted the gender dynamics of the book, namely the ways in which women are left with unfulfilled lives while their male counterparts are able to achieve their dreams, ultimately stating: "Sestanovich writes with precise prose and winnows the narratives into the most meaningful moments in the lives of her characters. Her skill as a storyteller is drawing out subtle emotional responses even as she crafts broader narratives."

NPR stated that Sestanovich's stories were not plot-driven in a traditional sense but nonetheless "contain plot insomuch as real life contains plot: we make sense and meaning out of what we're given... The book's tiny moments are what create layers atop the unexceptional."

Harvard Review noted that several of the stories had to do with "art and artmaking. Several of the stories here feature painters, creative writing instructors, MFA graduates, and filmmakers." The reviewer also found that rather than proceeding along the plot, the stories moved by digression, which, as a substitute, still provided them with a sense of drama.

The Guardian observed the topicality of Sestanovich's stories: "Workplace misogyny fuels tweets and meditation apps chime; marriages are open and complexities cultivated. Nostalgia, fame, and authenticity become recurring preoccupations." Ultimately, the reviewer found the book to be a solid look into modern urban life in the United States. Another reviewer at The Guardian similarly stated that "These stories of women in a very particular place and time in the American 21st century—pre-Covid, wealthy, liberal, coastal metropolitan—are full of privilege and of lostness; of anxiety, and waste, and the anxiety of waste, where the waste is more often than not of their own hot-housed potential."

The Times Literary Supplement found Sestanovich's prose "poised. Her clean and polished storytelling underscores the fine line between how we wish to be seen and how to appear." The reviewer also observed her skills in dialogue and tone.
