= Wise Men (Nadler novel) =

2013 novel by Stuart Nadler

- Author: Stuart Nadler
- Language: English
- Genre: Fiction
- Publisher: Reagan Arthur Books
- Publication date: February 5, 2013
- Pages: 335
- ISBN: 978-0-316-12648-9
- OCLC: 793580297

Wise Men is the debut novel of Stuart Nadler. It was published by Reagan Arthur Books on February 5, 2013. The plot of the novel follows Hilly Wise, who falls in love with Savannah, the niece of a black caretaker. Wise Men has received varied reviews from literary critics.

== Plot ==
Hillard (Hilly) Wise gives the novel first-person narration. Wise Men is broken into three sections: 1947–52, during Hilly's adolescence; 1972; and the present. Hilly grows up in New Haven, Connecticut, where the Wises are Jewish in a non-Gentile community. Arthur Wise, Hilly's father, is an ambulance chaser who becomes very wealthy from class-action lawsuits involving airplane crashes. From Arthur's wealth, the family decides to move to the WASP community of Bluepoint, Cape Cod. Included in the deal is a black caretaker, Lem Dawson. The family hires Lem for $8 per week.

Lem and Hilly form a friendship despite Arthur's dis-allowance; as a result, Hilly must keep the relationship secret. Lem introduces him to his niece, Savannah, and Hilly falls in love with her. Hilly meets Savannah's father Charles Ewing, a baseball player cut from the Milwaukee Braves due to race. Savannah wants to run away with Lem. Hilly originally wants to join them, but he changes his mind and disrupts their attempt. Later, Arthur proffers Hilly $70 million, which he rejects on moral grounds. Now working as a "race relations" reporter for a Boston newspaper, Hilly travels to Iowa for a story about Ewing, which he thinks may have to do with Savannah.

Carolyn Cooke compared the general plot of Wise Men to the general plot of John Cheever novels, as both are about "men behaving badly through the second half of the 20th century". The timespan has been compared to Gabriel García Márquez's Love in the Time of Cholera.

== Reception ==
Wise Men has received varied reviews from literary critics. The New York Times writer Janet Maslin called the novel's title, setting, and central romance "whoppingly bland," but then added, "It becomes a bigger, more surprising book that it initially seems to be." Editorial director of Amazon.com Sara Nelson picked the novel as Best Book of the Month and said, "Think Harper Lee crossed with Philip Roth: This is a truly Great American Novel. Kate Tuttle of The Boston Globe called it "genuinely moving." Cooke criticized the first-person narrative and the overuse of red herrings. Oprah.com, however, named Wise Men a "Book of the Week". In a review for The Daily Beast, Nicholas Mancusi praised the novel for its "surprise ending". People Magazine called it "a historical novel with the gusto of Gatsby." Kevin Nguyen of Grantland called it "the second coming of John Cheever." And New York Journal of Books called it "a powerful tale dealing with familial dysfunction and racial differences, touching the heart of raw human emotion with insight and depth.". Nancy Carty Lepri said, "Wise Men is a powerful tale dealing with familial dysfunction and racial differences, touching the heart of raw human emotion with insight and depth." On November 12, 2012, the National Book Foundation named Nadler a "5 Under 35 Honoree".
