= New England Review =

Literary magazine

- Cover of Vol. 32, No. 3 (2011)
- Editor-in-chief: Carolyn Kuebler
- Former name: New England Review and Bread Loaf Quarterly (1982–1990)
- Former editors: Stephen Donadio
- Categories: Literary magazine
- Frequency: Quarterly
- Format: print
- Founded: 1978, in Hanover, New Hampshire
- First issue: Autumn 1978
- Company: Middlebury College
- Country: United States
- Language: English
- Website: www.nereview.com
- ISSN: 1053-1297
- OCLC: 1030840063

The New England Review (NER) is an American quarterly literary magazine established in 1978. It was founded in Hanover, New Hampshire, by Sydney Lea and Jay Parini and moved to Middlebury College in Middlebury, Vermont four years later. In its early years, the magazine struggled financially, until the college agreed to sponsor its annual budget in 1987. From 1982 until 1990, the magazine was named New England Review and Bread Loaf Quarterly, reverting to its original name in 1991.

NER publishes poetry, fiction, translations, and nonfiction (including personal essays, travelogues, and cultural criticism) by distinguished and debut authors. Carolyn Kuebler has served as the magazine's editor since 2014.

The magazine's branding has been described as "focused towards formality with an overtone of introspective eccentricism."

The New England Review Award for Emerging Writers provides a full scholarship to the Bread Loaf Writers' Conference for an emerging writer in any genre, who offers an unusual and compelling new voice and who has been published in that year by the magazine. The awardee is selected by the editorial staff and the director of the conference.

Authors published in New England Review include Raven Leilani, Victoria Chang, Lisa Taddeo, Terrance Hayes, May Lee Chai, Carl Phillips, Christine Sneed, Lori Ostlund, Kim McLarin, Castle Freeman Jr., Ada Limón, and Valeria Luiselli.

== See also ==
- Bread Loaf School of English
- List of literary magazines
