= National Book Foundation =

American nonprofit organization

- Founded: July 1989; 37 years ago
- Type: Non-profit
- Headquarters: New York City, U.S.
- Services: Celebrating literary achievements
- Fields: Literary Prize
- Key people: Ruth E. Dickey, Executive Director; David Steinberger, Chairman
- Staff: 8 staff, 18 board members
- Website: nationalbook.org

The National Book Foundation (NBF) is an American nonprofit organization established with the goal "to raise the cultural appreciation of great writing in America". Established in 1989 by National Book Awards, Inc., the foundation is the administrator and sponsor of the National Book Awards, a set of literary awards inaugurated in 1936 and continuous from 1950. It also organizes and sponsors public and educational programs.

The National Book Foundation's board of directors comprises representatives of American literary institutions and the book industry. In 2009, the board included the president of the New York Public Library, the chief merchandising officer of Barnes & Noble, the president/publisher of Grove/Atlantic, Inc., and others. In 2021, Ruth Dickey succeeded Lisa Lucas as the foundation's fourth executive director.

== Awards ==
=== National Book Awards ===
Founded in 1950, the National Book Awards are a series of annual literary prizes awarded to recognize outstanding American literature. Although other categories have been recognized in the past, the awards currently recognize the best works in the following published each year:

- Fiction
- Nonfiction
- Poetry
- Translated Literature
- Young People's Literature

Non-citizens of the United States were ineligible for the National Book Award until 2018, when a petition process was introduced.

The honored titles in each category are decided by an independent panel of writers, librarians, booksellers, and critics. These panels of five judges in each category select a longlist of ten titles per category, which is then narrowed down to five finalists. Winners are announced at the National Book Awards Ceremony and Benefit Dinner in November.

=== 5 Under 35 ===
The 5 Under 35 program was started in 2005 in order to honor five debut fiction writers, all under the age of thirty-five. The honorees are all chosen by previous National Book Awards–honored writers or 5 Under 35 honorees. Each award comes with a cash prize of $1,000. The 5 Under 35 Ceremony has been hosted by Questlove, Carrie Brownstein, LeVar Burton and others.

=== Science + Literature ===
Started in 2022 by the NBF and the Alfred P. Sloan Foundation, the Science + Literature program awards three books published in the US annually that "deepen readers' understanding of science and technology."

=== Lifetime Achievement ===
In addition to the five National Book Awards presented each year, the foundation presents two lifetime achievement awards: the Medal for Distinguished Contribution to American Letters and the Literarian Award for Outstanding Service to the American Literary Community.

== Other programs ==
=== Education programs ===
==== BookUp ====
BookUp, the National Book Foundation's flagship educational program, connects middle- and high-school students with local authors and runs free reading groups. Since its start in 2007, BookUp has given away over 35,000 free books. The program currently serves students at over 20 different sites in New York City, Detroit, Los Angeles, and Huntsville, TX, helping approximately 500 students to build their home libraries as well as their literacy skills each year.

==== Book Rich Environments ====
The Book Rich Environments initiative connects families living in public housing communities with reading-related resources including free, high-quality books, library activities, and educational programming. The program is conducted in 37 HUD-assisted communities nationwide. Since 2017, the program has distributed over two million free books to children and families.

==== NBF Teacher Fellowship ====
The National Book Foundation (NBF) Teacher Fellowship aims to support 6th-12th grade public school teachers "using innovative methods to make reading for pleasure a part of their students' school day experience" through professional development, a book buying budget, and a small stipend.

==== Teens Read the National Book Awards ====
Teens Read the National Book Awards, formerly known as “Teen Press Conference,” is an annual event where New York City high school students interview National Book Award nominated authors.

=== Public programs ===
==== NBF Presents ====
NBF Presents programs bring National Book Awards honorees a to libraries, colleges, book festivals, and performance venues across the country for a series of readings and other literary events. The series is partially modeled after the long-running National Book Awards on Campus program, which began in 2005. National Book Awards on Campus brought National Book Award winners and finalists to college campuses at Sam Houston State University, Concordia College, Amherst College, and Rollins College, all of which continue to host NBF Presents events each year.

==== Literature for Justice ====
Literature for Justice (LFJ) is a campaign that seeks "to contextualize and humanize the experiences of incarcerated people in the United States" by selecting and promoting a list of five books, chosen annually by a group of authors and advocates for the incarcerated to the American reading public.

=== Past Programs ===
Recent past programs include Author in Focus; Eat, Drink & Be Literary; the Innovations in Reading Prize; Notes from the Reading Life; Raising Readers; and Why Reading Matters.

== See also ==
- National Book Award

== Citations ==
- National Book Foundation. nationalbook.org.

National Book Foundation: Presenter of the National Book Awards. This home page retrieved 2014-12-06 carries the internal title "2014 National Book Award Winners".
