= Aspen Words Literary Prize =

- Sponsored by: Aspen Words
- Country: United States
- Status: Active
- First award: 2018

The Aspen Words Literary Prize, established in 2018, is an annual literary award presented by Aspen Words, a literary center in Aspen, Colorado. The prize is presented to an author for "an influential work of fiction that illuminates a vital contemporary issue and demonstrates the transformative power of literature on thought and culture.” Winners receive a US$35,000 prize.

The award is open to authors of any nationality whose novels or short story collections are published by a U.S. trade publisher. The judging process specifically focuses on works that address vital social issues, such as violence, racial injustice, immigration, gender, and the environment. The prize money has consistently been US$35,000, making it one of the largest literary prizes in the United States focused exclusively on fiction with a social impact. Past winners include the inaugural recipient Mohsin Hamid (2018) for his novel Exit West, Tayari Jones (2019) for An American Marriage, and Tommy Orange (2025) for Wandering Stars.

== Recipients ==
Aspen Words Literary Prize winners and finalists
Year	Author	Title	Result	Ref.
2018	Mohsin Hamid	Exit West	Winner	
2018	Lesley Nneka Arimah	What It Means When a Man Falls from the Sky	Shortlist	
2018	Zinzi Clemmons	What We Lose	Shortlist	
2018	Samrat Upadhyay	Mad Country	Shortlist	
2018	Jesmyn Ward	Sing, Unburied, Sing	Shortlist	
2018	Alain Mabanckou	Black Moses	Longlist	
2018	Weike Wang	Chemistry	Longlist	
2018	Roxane Gay	Difficult Women	Longlist	
2018	Rowan Hisayo Buchanan	Harmless Like You	Longlist	
2018	Shanthi Sekaran	Lucky Boy	Longlist	
2018	Vaddey Ratner	Music of the Ghosts	Longlist	
2018	Hala Alyan	Salt Houses	Longlist	
2018	Bandi	The Accusation	Longlist	
2018	Jean Hanff Korelitz	The Devil and Webster	Longlist	
2018	Megan Hunter	The End We Start From	Longlist	
2018	Curtis Dawkins	The Graybar Hotel	Longlist	
2018	Lisa Ko	The Leavers	Longlist	
2018	Jonathan Dee	The Locals	Longlist	
2018	Viet Thanh Nguyen	The Refugees	Longlist	
2018	Achy Obejas	The Tower of the Antilles	Longlist	
2019	Tayari Jones	An American Marriage	Winner	
2019	Nana Kwame Adjei-Brenyah	Friday Black	Shortlist	
2019	David Chariandy	Brother	Shortlist	
2019	Jennifer Clement	Gun Love	Shortlist	
2019	Tommy Orange	There There	Shortlist	
2019	Elaine Castillo	America Is Not the Heart	Longlist	
2019	Will Mackin	Bring Out the Dog	Longlist	
2019	Akwaeke Emezi	Freshwater	Longlist	
2019	Nafissa Thompson-Spires	Heads of the Colored People	Longlist	
2019	Neel Patel	If You See Me, Don't Say Hi	Longlist	
2019	Jamel Brinkley	Lucky Man	Longlist	
2019	Ling Ma	Severance	Longlist	
2019	Gaël Faye	Small Country	Longlist	
2019	Sharon Bala	The Boat People	Longlist	
2019	R. O. Kwon	The Incendiaries	Longlist	
2019	Brandon Hobson	Where the Dead Sit Talking	Longlist	
2020	Christy Lefteri	The Beekeeper of Aleppo	Winner	
2020	Nicole Dennis-Benn	Patsy	Shortlist	
2020	Brian Allen Carr	Opioid, Indiana	Shortlist	
2020	Valeria Luiselli	Lost Children Archive	Shortlist	
2020	Bryan Washington	Lot	Shortlist	
2020	Steph Cha	Your House Will Pay	Longlist	
2020	Angie Cruz	Dominicana	Longlist	
2020	Kali Fajardo-Anstine	Sabrina & Corina	Longlist	
2020	Laila Lalami	The Other Americans	Longlist	
2020	Beth Piatote	The Beadworkers	Longlist	
2020	Melissa Rivero	The Affairs of the Falcóns	Longlist	
2020	Maurice Carlos Ruffin	We Cast a Shadow	Longlist	
2020	Rion Amilcar Scott	The World Doesn't Require You	Longlist	
2020	Ocean Vuong	On Earth We're Briefly Gorgeous	Longlist	
2020	Colson Whitehead	The Nickel Boys	Longlist	
2020	Jacqueline Woodson	Red at the Bone	Longlist	
2021	Louise Erdrich	The Night Watchman	Winner	
2021	Susan Abulhawa	Against the Loveless World	Shortlist	
2021	Rumaan Alam	Leave the World Behind	Shortlist	
2021	Danielle Evans	The Office of Historical Corrections	Shortlist	
2021	Randall Kenan	If I Had Two Wings: Stories	Shortlist	
2021	Brit Bennett	The Vanishing Half	Longlist	
2021	Diane Cook	The New Wilderness	Longlist	
2021	Juliana Delgado Lopera	Fiebre Tropical	Longlist	
2021	Akwaeke Emezi	The Death of Vivek Oji	Longlist	
2021	Yaa Gyasi	Transcendent Kingdom	Longlist	
2021	Lydia Millet	A Children's Bible: A Novel	Longlist	
2021	Jennifer Nansubuga Makumbi	A Girl Is a Body of Water	Longlist	
2021	Tola Rotimi Abraham	Black Sunday	Longlist	
2021	Brandon Taylor	Real Life	Longlist	
2021	Bryan Washington	Memorial	Longlist	
2022	Dawnie Walton	The Final Revival of Opal & Nev	Winner	
2022	Hala Alyan	The Arsonists' City	Shortlist	
2022	Myriam J. A. Chancy	What Storm, What Thunder	Shortlist	
2022	Omar El Akkad	What Strange Paradise	Shortlist	
2022	Kirstin Valdez Quade	The Five Wounds	Shortlist	
2022	Nawaaz Ahmed	Radiant Fugitives	Longlist	
2022	Tahmima Alam	The Startup Wife	Longlist	
2022	Peter Ho Davies	A Lie Someone Told You About Yourself	Longlist	
2022	Linda Rui Feng	Swimming Back to Trout River	Longlist	
2022	Kaitlyn Greenidge	Libertie	Longlist	
2022	Jakob Guanzon	Abundance	Longlist	
2022	Honorée Fanonne Jeffers	The Love Songs of W.E.B. Du Bois	Longlist	
2022	Jason Mott	Hell of a Book	Longlist	
2022	Eric Nguyen	Things We Lost to the Water	Longlist	
2022	Richard Powers	Bewilderment	Longlist	
2022	Karen Tucker	Bewilderness	Longlist	
2023	Jamil Jan Kochai	The Haunting of Hajji Hotak and Other Stories	Winner	
2023	Angie Cruz	How Not to Drown in a Glass of Water	Finalist	
2023	Oscar Hokeah	Calling for a Blanket Dance	Finalist	
2023	Sarah Thankam Mathews	All This Could Be Different	Finalist	
2023	Manuel Muñoz	The Consequences	Finalist	
2023	Fatimah Asghar	When We Were Sisters	Longlist	
2023	NoViolet Bulawayo	Glory	Longlist	
2023	Jonathan Escoffery	If I Survive You	Longlist	
2023	Mohsin Hamid	The Last White Man	Longlist	
2023	Ladee Hubbard	The Last Suspicious Holdout	Longlist	
2023	Talia Laskshmi Kolluri	What We Fed to the Manticore	Longlist	
2023	Chinelo Okparanta	Harry Sylvester Bird	Longlist	
2023	Tara M. Stringfellow	Memphis	Longlist	
2023	Alejandro Varela	The People Who Report More Stress	Longlist	
2024	Isabella Hammad	Enter Ghost	Winner	
2024	Nana Kwame Adjei-Brenyah	Chain-Gang All-Stars	Finalist	
2024	Aaliyah Bilal	Temple Folk	Finalist	
2024	Jamel Brinkley	Witness	Finalist	
2024	James McBride	The Heaven & Earth Grocery Store	Finalist	
2024	Stephen Buoro	The Five Sorrowful Mysteries of Andy Africa	Longlist	
2024	Sonora Jha	The Laughter	Longlist	
2024	Claire Jiménez	What Happened to Ruthy Ramirez	Longlist	
2024	R. F. Kuang	Yellowface	Longlist	
2024	Rebecca Makkai	I Have Some Questions for You	Longlist	
2024	Jennifer Maritza McCauley	When Trying to Return Home: Stories	Longlist	
2024	Alejandro Varela	The People Who Report More Stress: Stories	Longlist	
2024	Jesmyn Ward	Let Us Descend	Longlist	
2024	C Pam Zhang	Land of Milk and Honey	Longlist	
2025	Tommy Orange	Wandering Stars	Winner	
2025	Percival Everett	James	Finalist	
2025	Afabwaje Kurian	Before the Mango Ripens	Finalist	
2025	Ruben Ryes Jr.	There Is a Rio Grande in Heaven	Finalist	
2025	Yael van der Wouden	The Safekeep	Finalist	
2025	Chelsea Bieker	Madwoman	Longlist	
2025	Cebo Campbell	Sky Full of Elephants	Longlist	
2025	Xochitl Gonzalez	Anita de Monte Laughs Last	Longlist	
2025	Shilpi Somaya Gowda	A Great Country	Longlist	
2025	Fabienne Josaphat	Kingdom of No Tomorrow	Longlist	
2025	Samuel Kọ́láwọ́lẹ́	The Road to the Salt Sea	Longlist	
2025	Eric Rickstad	Lilith	Longlist	
2025	Morgan Talty	Fire Exit	Longlist	
2025	John Vercher	Devil Is Fine	Longlist	
2026	Maria Reva	Endling	Winner	
2026	Rabih Alameddine	The True True Story of Raja the Gullible (and His Mother)	Finalist	
2026	Sonora Jha	Intemperance	Finalist	
2026	Charlotte McConaghy	Wild Dark Shore	Finalist	
2026	Jess Walter	So Far Gone	Finalist	
2026	S. A. Cosby	King of Ashes	Longlist	
2026	Angela Flournoy	The Wilderness	Longlist	
2026	Bruce Holsinger	Culpability	Longlist	
2026	Wally Lamb	The River Is Waiting	Longlist	
2026	Michelle Lerner	Ring: A Novel	Longlist	
2026	Claire Lynch	A Family Matter	Longlist	
2026	Mia McKenzie	These Heathens: A Novel	Longlist	
2026	Dolen Perkins-Valdez	Happy Land	Longlist	
2026	Princess Joy L. Perry	This Here Is Love	Longlist	
2026	Kionna Walker LeMalle	Behind the Waterline	Longlist	
