= Chain-Gang All-Stars =

2023 novel by Nana Kwame Adjei-Brenyah

- Author: Nana Kwame Adjei-Brenyah
- Cover artist: Kimberly Glyder
- Language: English
- Genre: Speculative fiction; science fiction; dystopian
- Published: May 2, 2023 (Pantheon Books)
- Publication place: United States
- Pages: 367
- ISBN: 978-0593317334
- OCLC: 1410911242

Chain-Gang All-Stars is the debut novel of American author Nana Kwame Adjei-Brenyah, published by Pantheon Books on May 2, 2023. It was a finalist for the 2023 National Book Award for Fiction, as well as other awards. The novel is set in an imagined America, where convicted wards of state are offered an alternative path to death row or 25-plus years sentences and participate in televised death matches under the "Criminal Action Penal Entertainment (CAPE)" program. The story centers around Loretta Thurwar and Hamara "Hurricane Staxxx" Stacker, two of CAPE's most famous combatants and partners in life and battle.

Adjei-Brenyah critiques the carceral system, capitalist society, and commodification of human suffering.

== Plot ==
Chain Gang All Stars is a work of speculative fiction about the carceral system in the United States, in which inmates can enroll in the CAPE (Criminal Action Penal Entertainment) program. CAPE participating prisoners may be either High or Low Freed (released or killed, respectively) through surviving a number of years as members of a futuristic version of a chain gang called a "Chain," where each prisoner serves as a "Link." They travel the states competing in gladiator matches. As part of the CAPE program, inmates are under constant, publicly-broadcast surveillance that serves as a popular form of entertainment across the nation. Many join after enduring harsh conditions while incarcerated, such as forced silence, solitary confinement, and prison brutality.

The novel follows the Angola-Hammond Chain, composed of Hamara "Hurricane Staxxx" Stacker, Loretta "Blood Mama" Thurwar, Randy Mac, and other Links including the recently deceased Sunset Harkless. It opens with Hurricane Staxxx and Loretta Thurwar, the novel's romantically-involved main protagonists, as they defeat their respective opponents in battle. We briefly meet eventual members of another Chain, Hendrix Young and Simon J. Craft. The battles draw a large crowd, including a couple that voyeuristically consumes all Chain Gang content and a group of protestors that oppose the CAPE program.

The second act opens with Simon J. Craft held in solitary confinement and subjected to a futuristic form of police brutality through the use of the Influencer. We then go back to the activist Mari, Sunset Harkless's daughter, who is in a meeting with the abolitionist group Coalition to End Neo-Slavery to decide if they should support the broadcaster Tracy Lasser who protested CAPE on the air. It is then revealed when we get back to the primary chain that Thurwar has a bad knee, just as the chain is brought into a "Melee" with another chain. After a short discussion and before the fight can begin, a man from the other chain commits suicide so that the two Chains do not need to come to blows and risk Thurwar being injured. We are taken to a boardroom where the board votes in favor of a new rule for season 33 that means Staxxx and Thurwar will fight each other.

We are then taken back to Simon J. Craft, whose mental state has deteriorated due to solitary confinement and influencing and is pressured into murdering a man in a staged brawl. A flashback takes us through the life of the inventor of the influencer device, a device whose origins lie in attempting to eradicate pain but instead amplifies it. The inventor burns down the lab she works in and is imprisoned. Hendrix is then introduced to his chain, where he is accepted by Bells, Razor, and Eighty, and racially mocked by the white supremacist Eraser triplets. Simon is introduced to this chain where he kills all the links except Hendrix, who does not retaliate. Thurwar and Staxxx spar, seeing each other as opponents for the first time. The A-Hamm chain marches to Old Taperville, Staxxx's hometown, to give a sports presser and participate in a farmer's market as part of community service. A protest overwhelms the market and causes Staxxx and Thurwar to reveal personal secrets to one another.

Staxxx recounts a night where Sunset Harkless addresses the rest of the A-Hamm chain off camera. He tells them to forgive themselves and be better people. After the meeting, Sunset removes himself from the rest of the group, bringing Staxxx with him away from the others so that they remain unseen. He informs Staxxx of the upcoming rule change for Season 33 and subsequently asks her to help him commit suicide because he cannot forgive himself.

The book then transitions to the development of Hendrix and Craft as a duo, establishing their dynamic as warden and ward.

Thurwar and Staxxx prepare Randy Mac for his fight, which they expect will end with his demise. It is revealed that Mari is attending the battle, where she sees Randy Mac's death. Before the doubles match, Mari storms the field with a sign that reads "Where Life Is Precious, Life Is Precious." Guards seize her and use the Influencer on her before she is taken off the field. In the battle, Singer is slain first, causing Craft to rush over to his body. This allows Staxxx to finish the fight by killing Craft.

Before the first fight of Season 33, Thurwar and Staxx have a heart to heart during another night off camera, leaving both uneasy about their upcoming fight. During their match, Thurwar addresses the crowd for the first time in months. Thurwar ultimately becomes High Freed by killing Staxxx, her lover.

== Development ==
I didn't always know it would be a novel. Originally, I wanted it to be a short story in Friday Black. But there was just too much to say once I got started. By the time the book comes out, the idea will be eight years old, so I've had it in my head for a while now.

— Adjei-Brenyah, on the novel's conception

Adjei-Brenyah originally conceived Chain Gang All-Stars as a short story in his collection Friday Black. He did extensive research for the novel, such as food in prisons and children affected by parents who are incarcerated.

He explained its purpose, "I've been interrogating this idea that is sort of hard-baked in so much of our media, so many of our police procedurals, that there are good people and bad people, and bad people deserve to be punished or bad things happen to them. And I think abolition in this book are really trying to get us to interrogate those ideas and see if we can move towards something a little bit more nuanced and elevated."

The novel is dedicated to his father, who was a criminal defense attorney. In the epigraph, he quotes American rapper Kendrick Lamar's "The Art of Peer Pressure": "I hope the Universe love you today," from Good Kid, M.A.A.D City (2012). He named the rapper as a major influence on him, who "says things that matter". He intentionally used footnotes to break the narrative, calling this an "ethical decision" as readers could forget what Chain-Gang is commentating on.

== Themes ==
Adjei-Brenyah tackles themes of systemic racism, the prison-industrial complex, exploitation, and the spectacle of violence in media. Chain-Gang All-Stars reflects on society's capacity for both dehumanization and resilience, challenging readers to examine where entertainment, profit, and justice intersect in harmful ways.

== Reception ==
Chain-Gang All-Stars received starred reviews from Booklist, Kirkus Reviews, Library Journal, and Publishers Weekly.

Kirkus Reviews compared the novel to "a rowdy, profane, and indignant blues shout" version of The Hunger Games. In The Wall Street Journal, Sam Sacks also compared the novel to The Hunger Games, as well as to Squid Game, Battle Royale, and Invisible Man, though Sacks' review was more mixed, noting that "since the novel assails the exploitation of black prisoners for entertainment, it cannot be freely entertaining itself, and a dampening sense of shame and reluctance permeates the scenes, which are often interrupted by footnotes dispensing sobering statistics about the prison system—not the one in the novel but the real one." Sacks concluded: "A straightforwardly realistic novel about prisons would be infinitely more damning—though, paradoxically, it would never be selected for book clubs."

Contrary to Sacks's review, Booklist's Terry Hong said that "Adjei-Brenyah's reality-adjacent tale could ultimately, terrifyingly, prove prescient." Hong explained: "What might seem to be a dystopian nightmare is even more terrifying because Adjei-Brenyah brilliantly broadcasts such irrefutable truths as the U.S. having the world's highest rate of incarceration, with disproportionate numbers of Black and POC prisoners. His chilling footnotes shrewdly interrupt his fiction with real names and stark statistics, exposing racism, inequity, corruption, suicide, and abuse." Hong concluded: "Given the rampant, explicit brutality, all should heed a character's warning, 'I'll tell you and I can't untell you, you understand?'"

Similarly, Publishers Weekly highlighted how "the author delivers insightful critiques of the prison-industrial complex, capitalism, and the ways in which Hollywood and celebrity culture exploit Black talent," while also indicating that "both the political allegory and the edge-of-your-seat action work beautifully."

Library Journal's Sarah Hashimoto called Chain-Gang All-Stars "an unforgettable book reverberating with alarming truths and providing an uncomfortable look at an all-too-imaginable future".

Jennifer M. Brown, writing for Shelf Awareness, called Chain-Gang All-Stars a "powerful, imaginative debut novel" that "pulls no punches in the parallels he draws between incarceration and slavery, unpaid labor and power imbalance". Brown concluded, "The story may be fiction, but Adjei-Brenyah delivers the truth."

Bidisha Mamata, writing for The Observer, called the novel "crushingly painful" with "loaded and on-the-nose commentary on racism, exploitation, inequality and the legacy and loud echoes of slavery in the US." Like Sacks, Mamata felt that

the richness of the conceit makes it tiresome to read [...] Even though the ideas are big and bold, the novel is a slog. In its characters' endless cycle of violence, misery, trauma and rumination, all light and shade is lost. There is action in spades, but little real plot; dialogue, but little psychological nuance. We are told many of the condemned characters' tragic backstories, often in poignantly throwaway footnotes....we do not feel them or feel for them. The main characters glower like video game characters and talk like CGI bounty hunters.

Mamata indicated that "Adjei-Brenyah is clearly a writer of substance, with something to say" but thought readers should "skip" reading Chain-Gang All-Stars "and wait instead for pop culture to eat itself, shed all irony and churn out the inevitable Netflix adaptation".

Ron Charles of The Washington Post called the novel, "a devastating indictment of our penal system and our attendant enthusiasm for violence." Charles further stated, "Adjei-Brenyah's book presents a dystopian vision so upsetting and illuminating that it should permanently shift our understanding of who we are and what we're capable of doing."

== Awards and honors ==
The New York Times named Chain-Gang All-Stars one of the top ten books of 2023. Kirkus Reviews and Shelf Awareness also included it on their list of the year's best books. Booklist included it on their list of the top ten debut novels of the year.

Year	Award	Result	Result	Ref.
2023	Barnes & Noble Discover Great New Writers Award	Fiction	Finalist	
2023	Center for Fiction First Novel Prize	—	Longlisted	
2023	Goodreads Choice Awards	Science Fiction	Nominated	
2023	Goodreads Choice Awards	Debut	Nominated	
2023	Gordon Burn Prize	—	Longlisted	
2023	National Book Award	Fiction	Finalist	
2023	Waterstones Debut Fiction Prize	—	Shortlisted	
2024	Alex Awards	—	Finalist	
2024	Andrew Carnegie Medals for Excellence	Fiction	Longlisted	
2024	Arthur C. Clarke Award	—	Finalist	
2024	Aspen Words Literary Prize	—	Shortlisted	
2024	Chautauqua Prize	—	Shortlisted	
2024	International Dublin Literary Award	—	Longlisted	
2024	Locus Award	First Novel	Finalist	
2024	Mark Twain American Voice in Literature Award	—	Longlisted	
2024	Publishing Triangle Awards	Ferro-Grumley Award	Finalist	
2024	Young Lions Fiction Award	—	Finalist	
