= I Don't Blame You =

Song by Cat Power

from the album You Are Free
- Published: February 18, 2003
- Recorded: 2002
- Genre: Indie rock
- Length: 3:05
- Label: Matador
- Songwriter: Chan Marshall

"I Don't Blame You" is a song by the American singer-songwriter Cat Power, also known as Chan Marshall. It is the first song on her sixth album, You Are Free, released in February 2003.

== Origin and recording ==
"I Don't Blame You" was the last song written for You Are Free. "I remember when I was at the piano and we were mixing and I kept playing it over and over and over while no one was there," Marshall revealed in a 2003 Pitchfork interview. "They were playing ping-pong and stuff. So I just asked, 'Can I record this song real quick?'" In the same interview, Marshall revealed that "I Don't Blame You" was her favorite song on the album because "it's the freshest in my memory."

Three years later, Marshall's affection for the song had not diminished, and she cited it as her favorite song to perform live, in an interview with Salon.

In an interview with Helter Skelter, Marshall revealed that she wanted "I Don't Blame You" to be a single. However, no single was released for the song, and a music video was never made.

A live version of the song, performed by Marshall on electric guitar in a forest in New York, appears on the 2004 Cat Power DVD, Speaking for Trees: A Film by Mark Borthwick.

== Composition and lyrics ==
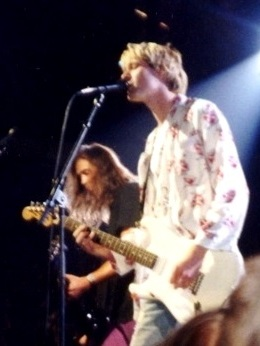
In a 2012 interview with The Guardian, Marshall confirmed that "I Don't Blame You" was written about Kurt Cobain, the late vocalist and guitarist of American rock band, Nirvana

The song tells the story of a rock star who is destroyed by fame. For years, Marshall refused to comment on the commonly held theory that it was written about Kurt Cobain, the late singer, songwriter and guitarist of the American rock band Nirvana, who committed suicide in 1994. When asked who the song was about in an interview with Helter Skelter, she replied, "You'll have to take a guess." When asked specifically if it was about Cobain, she replied, "It could be anybody!"

In a 2012 interview with The Guardian, however, Marshall confirmed that the song was about Cobain. "I've never told anybody this," she told interviewer Hermione Hoby, "but that is about Kurt Cobain. It's about him blowing his head off."

Years before confirming it was about Cobain, Marshall offered a less specific explanation of the song's meaning. "I'll never tell you what that song is about," she told Salon in 2006. "That feeling of not being understood, but supposedly being understood by everyone ... being inside of a spectacle, it's like being a prisoner of war. I don't know if that makes sense. It would be like being in an insane asylum, where you are who you are, and the only person you've ever been is yourself, but then they want you to be someone else."

== Reception ==
"I Don't Blame You" was ranked # 159 on Pitchfork's "Top 500 Tracks of the 2000s" in 2009.
