= Things We Lost to the Water =

2021 debut novel by Eric Nguyen

- Author: Eric Nguyen
- Language: English; Vietnamese
- Publisher: Alfred A. Knopf
- Publication date: May 4, 2021
- Pages: 304
- ISBN: 9780593317952
- Dewey Decimal: 813/.6
- LC Class: PS3614.G864

Things We Lost to the Water is the 2021 debut novel by American author Eric Nguyen.

== Synopsis ==
The novel is told from multiple perspectives between 1978 and 2005. Most of the story takes place in the lower income neighborhoods of New Orleans, Louisiana. Hương comes to New Orleans with her five-year-old son Tuấn and baby Bình at the beginning of the story from a Singaporean refugee camp. Her husband, Công, had chosen to stay in Vietnam. And she chooses to tell her children that he had died trying to leave North Vietnam. His absence punctuates the rest of the novel.

The children eventually look to grow out of their mother's overcompensating behavior. Tuấn, who seeks to connect with his roots, joins the local Vietnamese gang, whereas Bình (later adopting the name Ben), who was born in the refugee camp and has no ties to the past, is guided to pursue literature by a professor. Tuấn later recognizes that empathy is a measure of masculinity and Ben realizes that his life is not intrinsically more meaningful because he is allowed more freedom.

== Style and themes ==
Nguyen often blends English with Vietnamese in the novel.

Thúy Đinh for NPR likens Hương to "The Woman from Nam Xương," a Vietnamese folk tale about a mother who creates a symbolic father for her son in the absence of the real father during wartime. She notes the novel's connection to Nước, the Vietnamese word for country and water, and the different ways in which the Vietnamese community is affected by both via displacement, whether that be from the Vietnamese refugee crisis or Hurricane Katrina. Đinh further comments on the temporality of displacement by likening it to the 蒼海桑田 proverb—"everything will turn in time, as the blue seas will turn into mulberry fields.".

== Production ==
Nguyen had wanted to explore his parents' history in Vietnam and why they had chosen to leave in the 1970s. However, due to the lack of a Vietnamese community where he lived in the suburbs of Washington, the topic never came up. He became inspired to write the novel after visiting the Vietnamese community in New Orleans in 2012 and began writing the novel while pursuing his MFA at McNeese State University.

== Reception ==
=== Reviews ===
Bryan Washington for The New York Times wrote, "Nguyen’s narrative strikes a very elusive balance: vast in scale and ambition, while luscious and inviting — enchanting, really — in its intimacy." Thúy Đinh for NPR wrote, "'Things We Lost to the Water' gracefully manages to be both panoramic and specific, allegorical and literal." Kirkus Reviews wrote, "Debut author Nguyen movingly portrays the way adopted homes can become as cherished and familiar as ancestral ones...but also the truth that new loves can never quite heal old wounds.'

=== Awards and honors ===
The novel was selected as one of 11 books on Barack Obama's summer 2021 reading list.

The novel was longlisted for the 2021 Aspen Words Literary Prize and the 2022 Andrew Carnegie Medal for Excellence in Fiction.
