= Cool Aid =

Kool-Aid is a brand of flavored drink mix owned by Kraft Foods

Kool-Aid or Cool Aid may also refer to:

== Music ==
- Coolaid, 2016 album by Snoop Dogg
- Kool-Aid (album), the 1990 studio album from British musical group Big Audio Dynamite
- "Cool Aid", song by Paul Humphrey and His Cool Aid Chemists
- "Cool Aid", song by Phil Woods from Pairing Off
- "Cool Aid", song by The Movement from Set It Off
- "Kool-Aid" (song), a 2024 song by Bring Me the Horizon

== Other uses ==
- Kool-Aid McKinstry (born 2002), American football player
- Cool Aid: The National Carbon Test, Australian TV show by Network Ten
- Koolaids: The Art of War, a 1998 novel by Rabih Alameddine

== See also ==
- Drinking the Kool-Aid, an American term for blind adherence to a bad idea
