= Claire Jiménez =

Puerto Rican writer

Claire Jiménez is a Puerto Rican writer who grew up in Brooklyn and Staten Island, New York. She is the author of the short story collection Staten Island Stories (2019) and the novel What Happened to Ruthy Ramirez (2023), which won the PEN/Faulkner Award for Fiction.

What Happened to Ruthy Ramirez was favorably reviewed by the Associated Press, USA Today, and Kirkus Reviews. Jiménez was also named a finalist for the International Latino Book Awards, and the novel was named Best Latino Book of 2019 by NBC News.

Jiménez co-founded the Puerto Rican Literature Project in 2019.

In 2019, her book Staten Island Stories won the Hornblower Award for a first book from the New York Society Library.

Jiménez has an MFA from Vanderbilt University, and in 2022 she earned a Ph.D. in English with a concentration in ethnic studies and digital humanities from University of Nebraska–Lincoln.

Jiménez is an assistant professor and McCausland Faculty Fellow at University of South Carolina.

Her essays have appeared in Afro-Hispanic Review and The Rumpus.

== Awards ==
| Year | Title | Award | Category | Result | Ref. |
|---|---|---|---|---|---|
| 2019 | Staten Island Stories | New York City Book Award | First Book | Won | |
| 2023 | What Happened to Ruthy Ramirez | Booklist Editor's Choice | Adult Books | Selected | |
| 2024 | What Happened to Ruthy Ramirez | Aspen Words Literary Prize | — | Longlisted | |
| 2024 | What Happened to Ruthy Ramirez | PEN/Faulkner Award for Fiction | — | Won | |

== Biblio ==
- Staten Island Stories (Johns Hopkins University Press, 2019)
- Happened to Ruthy Ramirez (Grand Central, 2023)
