= An Unnecessary Woman =

2014 novel by Rabih Alameddine

First edition (publ. Grove Press)

An Unnecessary Woman is a 2014 novel by the Lebanese American writer Rabih Alameddine. The book was nominated for the National Book Award for Fiction. The novel focuses on the experiences of an isolated 72-year-old widow, Aaliya Saleh, who is a shut-in in Beirut. She reads widely and deeply, translates favorite novels, and has a rich inner life to explore daily events.

== Themes ==
Saleh secretly translates Western literature, such as Anna Karenina and Austerlitz, into Arabic. She repeatedly refers to such contemporary authors as Italo Calvino. Within this context the novel focuses on the role of the reader in engaging and examining literature. As The Independent describes, "Aaliyah keeps company with her writers – living and dead" instead of people. The Washington Post said, "Literature is Aaliya's religion and much of the wonderful humor in 'An Unnecessary Woman' comes from her pithy contempt for those who fail to live up to its sacred precepts."

== Reception ==
The NPR critic noted that the plot is relatively limited, but praised the writing, stating that, "I can't remember the last time I was so gripped simply by a novel's voice."

The Guardian's reviewer, American novelist Claire Messud, similarly highlighted how the novel has a very "elastic" voice, as the author narrates the novel with both interior dialogue and other narrative strategies. The Guardian concludes positively, writing that, "precisely in its strangeness, a genuine literary pleasure: a complicated one."

Open Letters Monthly reviewer Steve Donoghue described the novel as "infinitely strange" but "smarter and more assured" than Alameddine's last novel The Hakawati. The Washington Post reviewer said the novel was as "epic as its predecessor". The Independent gave the novel a very positive review concluding, "read it once, read it twice, read other books for a decade or so, and then pick it up and read it anew. This one’s a keeper."
