= Nana Kwame Adjei-Brenyah =

American author (born c. 1991)

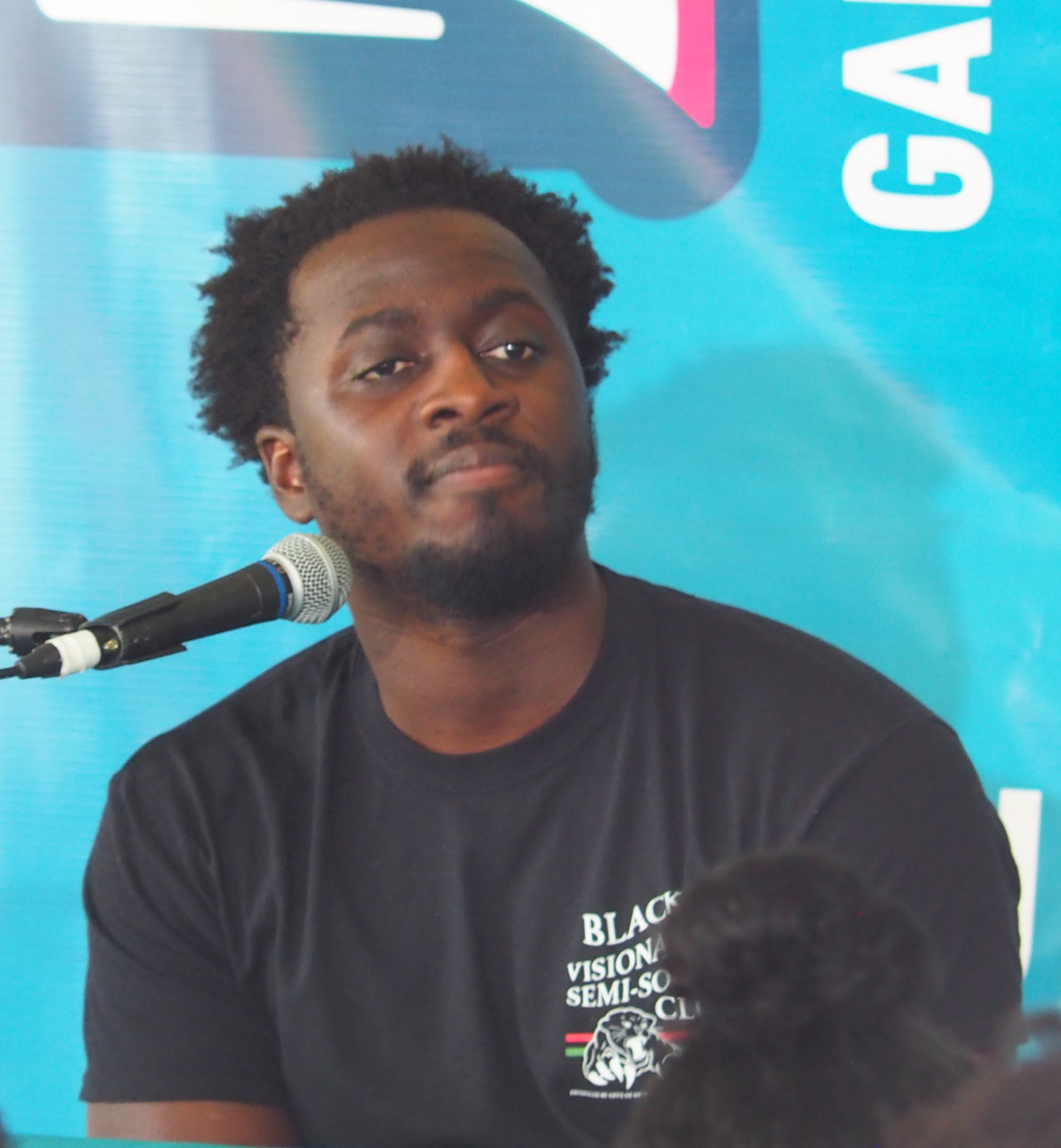
- Adjei-Brenyah in 2019
- Born: 1990 or 1991 (age 35–36); The Bronx, New York, U.S.
- Education: University at Albany; Syracuse University
- Writing career
- Language: English
- Genre: Speculative fiction
- Notable works: Friday Black (2018); Chain-Gang All-Stars (2023)
- Notable awards: PEN/Jean Stein Book Award (2019); Guggenheim Fellowship (2025)
- Website: nanakwameadjei-brenyah.com

Nana Kwame Adjei-Brenyah (born 1990 or 1991) is an American speculative fiction author who wrote the short-story collection Friday Black (2018) and the novel Chain-Gang All-Stars (2023). He was named a "5 under 35" honoree by the National Book Foundation in 2018 and won the PEN/Jean Stein Book Award in 2019. Chain-Gang All-Stars was shortlisted for the 2023 National Book Award for Fiction and named one of the 10 Best Books of 2023 by The New York Times. In 2025, he received a Guggenheim Fellowship.

== Early life and education ==
Adjei-Brenyah was born in The Bronx, New York, but grew up in Spring Valley, New York. Both of his parents are from Ghana. His father was a defense attorney and his mother was a kindergarten teacher. Adjei-Brenyah started writing from a young age and wrote for his high school's literature magazine.

Adjei-Brenyah went to the University at Albany for his undergraduate degree, where he studied with Lynne Tillman. He attended the graduate writing program at Syracuse University with the goal to study with George Saunders in the creative writing program. Saunders later became his thesis adviser and mentor.

After college, Adjei-Brenyah became interested in prison abolition and worked at the Rockland Coalition to End the New Jim Crow.

== Career ==
Adjei-Brenyah's published works are set in near-future dystopias. They often explore the topics of exploitation, capitalism, and the societal acceptance of violence. His non-fiction writing includes a foreword to How a Game Lives, a collection of critical essays by Jacob Geller.

In 2026, Adjei-Brenyah became the William H.P. Jenks Chair in Contemporary Letters at the College of the Holy Cross. Adjei-Brenyah has also taught in the graduate writing program at Syracuse University, Columbia University, and The New School.

=== Friday Black ===
Adjei-Brenyah's debut book is a collection of 12 satirical short stories exploring many topics, including racism in modern-day America, consumerism, school shootings, and intergenerational cycles of violence. Vulture described the book as "an irreverent, genre-bending approach to ripped-from-the-headlines subject matter".

=== Chain-Gang All-Stars ===
Adjei-Brenyah's first novel is set in a dystopian America where imprisoned people have the choice to leave prison by joining a gladiatorial system called the Criminal Action Penal Entertainment (CAPE) program, where they take part in televised duels to the death as part of alliances called Chain Gangs. If they survive three years of battles, then they are freed. The book has a large cast and is written from the perspectives of multiple people participating in the program, as well as activists fighting against it, fans, and the people running it.

The book is a fictional novel but features footnotes citing current real-life laws and factual statistics about incarceration in the United States.

Chain-Gang All-Stars started as a short story for inclusion in Friday Black but became too long. Adjei-Brenyah has said that he developed it into a novel because he felt he needed to spend more time exploring the main character, Loretta Thurwar.

Chain-Gang All-Stars was shortlisted for the 2023 National Book Award for Fiction. Kirkus Reviews gave it a starred review and chose the novel as one of the best books of 2023. The New York Times named it one of the 10 best books of 2023.

== Awards and nominations ==
Awards for Adjei-Brenyah's writing
Year	Work	Award	Result	Result	Ref.
2018	Friday Black	National Book Critics Circle Award	John Leonard Prize	Finalist	
2018	Friday Black	National Book Foundation	5 Under 35	Won	
2019	Friday Black	Aspen Words Literary Prize	—	Shortlisted	
2019	Friday Black	Dylan Thomas Prize	—	Shortlisted	
2019	Friday Black	PEN/Jean Stein Book Award	—	Won	
2020	Friday Black	William Saroyan International Prize for Writing	—	Won	
2023	Chain-Gang All-Stars	Barnes & Noble Discover Great New Writers Award	Fiction	Finalist	
2023	Chain-Gang All-Stars	Center for Fiction First Novel Prize	—	Longlisted	
2023	Chain-Gang All-Stars	Goodreads Choice Awards	Science Fiction	Nominated	
2023	Chain-Gang All-Stars	Goodreads Choice Awards	Debut	Nominated	
2023	Chain-Gang All-Stars	Gordon Burn Prize	—	Longlisted	
2023	Chain-Gang All-Stars	National Book Award	Fiction	Finalist	
2023	Chain-Gang All-Stars	Waterstones Debut Fiction Prize	—	Shortlisted	
2024	Chain-Gang All-Stars	Alex Awards	—	Finalist	
2024	Chain-Gang All-Stars	Andrew Carnegie Medals for Excellence	Fiction	Longlisted	
2024	Chain-Gang All-Stars	Arthur C. Clarke Award	—	Finalist	
2024	Chain-Gang All-Stars	Aspen Words Literary Prize	—	Shortlisted	
2024	Chain-Gang All-Stars	Chautauqua Prize	—	Shortlisted	
2024	Chain-Gang All-Stars	International Dublin Literary Award	—	Longlisted	
2024	Chain-Gang All-Stars	Locus Award	First Novel	Finalist	
2024	Chain-Gang All-Stars	Mark Twain American Voice in Literature Award	—	Longlisted	
2024	Chain-Gang All-Stars	Publishing Triangle Awards	Ferro-Grumley Award	Finalist	
2024	Chain-Gang All-Stars	Young Lions Fiction Award	—	Finalist	

== Publications ==
- —— (2018). Friday Black. Mariner/HarperCollins. ISBN 978-1-328-91124-7.
- —— (2023). Chain-Gang All-Stars. Pantheon/Knopf/Random House/PRH. ISBN 978-0-593-31734-1.
