= Sky Full of Elephants =

2024 novel by Cebo Campbell

- Author: Cebo Campbell
- Publisher: Simon & Schuster
- Publication date: 2024
- Pages: 304
- ISBN: 978-1-6680-3492-7

Sky Full of Elephants is the debut novel of American writer Cebo Campbell, published in 2024 by Simon & Schuster. It follows a father and daughter as they navigate a world in which all the white people disappear, and Black folk content with rebuilding, as well as healing from their collective history of violence, racism, and enslavement. In July 2026, Campbell confirmed that a film adaptation of the novel is in active development with Laurence Fishburne’s Cinema Gypsy Productions.

== Plot ==
The novel is set in a speculative near-future United States in which nearly all white Americans have died, leaving a vastly changed world.

Charlie Brunton, a Black man who spent twenty years in prison after being falsely convicted, is contacted by Sidney, the 19-year-old daughter he did not know he had. Sidney's white mother, Elizabeth, and all her immediate family are dead. Sidney is alone and desperate to find her remaining white relatives, who she believes have gone to Orange Beach, Alabama. Though she believes Charlie abandoned her after committing some unspecified wrongdoing, she demands that he help her.

The trip is complicated by Sidney's feelings toward Charlie and the apocalyptic event. She was raised to understand herself as white, leaving her with little connection to Black culture and difficulty accepting her Black identity. A pilot named Sailor agrees to fly them toward Alabama, where they are intercepted at the border and taken to Mobile, which has become the center of a new Black society in which conventional American institutions have been replaced by communal systems of work, education and governance, ruled by King and Queen Hosea and Vivian.

While Charlie becomes interested in Mobile, Sidney remains focused on finding her white relatives. Nona, Hosea and Vivian's daughter, befriends Sidney and helps her confront her unfamiliarity with Black culture and her own racial identity

Charlie discovers a machine constructed by Hosea. Hosea explains that he developed it after traveling to Haiti and studying collective historical memory and trauma. When he activated it before the events of the novel, it transmitted the accumulated emotional force of generations of Black experience. White people throughout the United States responded by drowning themselves. Charlie becomes troubled by the destructive consequences of the machine and the possibility that it could be used again.

Sidney leaves Mobile, and finds her aunt Agnes in Orange Beach, part of a religious community in which surviving white people prepare to drown themselves as part of a spiritual practice. Agnes expects Sidney to drown herself. Sidney learns the truth about Charlie's imprisonment. Charlie and Elizabeth had been romantically involved, but after Elizabeth's brother discovered the relationship, Elizabeth accused Charlie of rape. Charlie was convicted and imprisoned despite his innocence. Elizabeth later wrote him a letter expressing remorse but never attempted to correct the accusation. Sidney reads the letter and learns how much of her life is build upon racism and lies.

Sidney travels west to the Pacific Ocean. She enters the water and floats, releasing Elizabeth's letter into the ocean.

Meanwhile, in Mobile, Charlie decides to use Hosea's machine for a different purpose. During Mardi Gras, he activates it with himself as its power source, intending to return the collective Black consciousness to Black people rather than directing it outward, against white people. The resulting transmission reaches across the country, including Sidney at the Pacific Ocean.

== Reception ==
The book received a starred review in Publishers Weekly, calling it a "captivating near-future fantasy" that evokes Cormac McCarthy's novel The Road, and maintaining that its plot is a "stunning allegory" that will spark much discussion. It received a more critical review in Kirkus Reviews, which described it as a "plodding" novel weighed down by its "often too-florid prose and unrealistic dialogue".

Serena Puang, in her The Advocate review, calls Campbell's premise as daring and thought-provoking "as it is openly jarring", while acknowledging that like many speculative novels "the premise can get muddled". She maintains, however, that readers "willing to suspend their disbelief will see a version of utopia that doesn't include White people, and this is radical. So often, America's conceptualization of diversity is based on Whiteness." She lauds Campbell's ability to present a Black society that doesn't measure itself against whiteness or focus on trauma and the legacy of racism, and lists Toni Morrison and Suzan-Lori Parks as intellectual predecessors who "also made the argument in their work and other writings that Black people have their own narratives outside of racial conflict and the White gaze". Puang concludes that "the novel doesn't quite stick the landing right at the end, but it’s more than worth the journey".

== Awards and nominations ==
- Mark Twain American Voice in Literature Award 2025: Long list
- Aspen Words Literary Prize 2025: Long list
- Crook’s Corner Book Prize: Finalist 2025/2026
- Goodreads Choice Award for Favorite Debut Novel: Nominee/finalist
