= Sonora Jha =

American author and academic (born 1968)

- Jha in 2025
- Born: 1968 (age 57–58)
- Occupations: Author, journalist, professor
- Writing career
- Notable awards: 2026 Aspen Words Literary Prize, Finalist; 2024 Aspen Words Literary Prize, Longlist; 2024 Washington State Book Award for Fiction; AutHer Award for Fiction; Shakti Bhatt Prize, Finalist; the Hindu Prize, Finalist; DSC Prize for South Asian Literature, longlist

Sonora Jha is an American author, academic and journalist. Born in India in 1968, she worked for the Times of India before moving to Singapore and then the United States, where she is a professor of communications at Seattle University. She is the author of four books.

== Career ==
Jha published her first essay in the Times of India when she was 18, and eventually became Chief of Bureau and Special Correspondent. She covered crime, politics and culture in India before leaving for Singapore then the United States. In the U.S., she earned a PhD in Media and Public Affairs from Louisiana State University in 2003, and eventually became a professor of Communications at Seattle University, where she teaches public affairs reporting, international journalism, persuasive writing and blogging, media literacy and international cinema.

She has written four books: Intemperance (2025), The Laughter (2023), How to Raise a Feminist Son (2021) and Foreign (2013).

Her debut novel Foreign, is about the Indian farmer's suicide crisis. The Laughter won the 2024 Washington State Book Award for Fiction, was longlisted for the 2024 Aspen Words Literary Prize, and was named one of the Best Books of the Year by The New Yorker and NPR. Intemperance, a book about a twice-divorced woman holding a swayamvar, was a finalist for the 2026 Aspen Words Literary Prize and for the Washington State Book Award 2026, and was labeled one of the best books of 2025 by the Library Journal, the Los Angeles Public Library, Book Page and Ms. Magazine.

Her research covers social justice movements on social media, especially related to racial and gender justice, Feminism and social protest coverage in the press. She directs a study abroad trip covering mass media in India, and was the former advisor for The Spectator, Seattle University's campus newspaper.

== Personal life ==
Jha was born in India in 1968. Her father's ancestral village is in Bihar, India. She last visited there when she was two years old, until her return during the process of writing Intemperance.

In 2001, at 33 years old, while getting her PhD at the University of Louisiana, she was involved in a hit-and-run accident with her 6 year old in the car. While he was uninjured, her leg was severely injured. Her mother and sister flew from India to help her recover while her husband stayed in Singapore, and multiple facets of the local community came to help when they left.
