= Alejandro Varela (writer) =

American writer

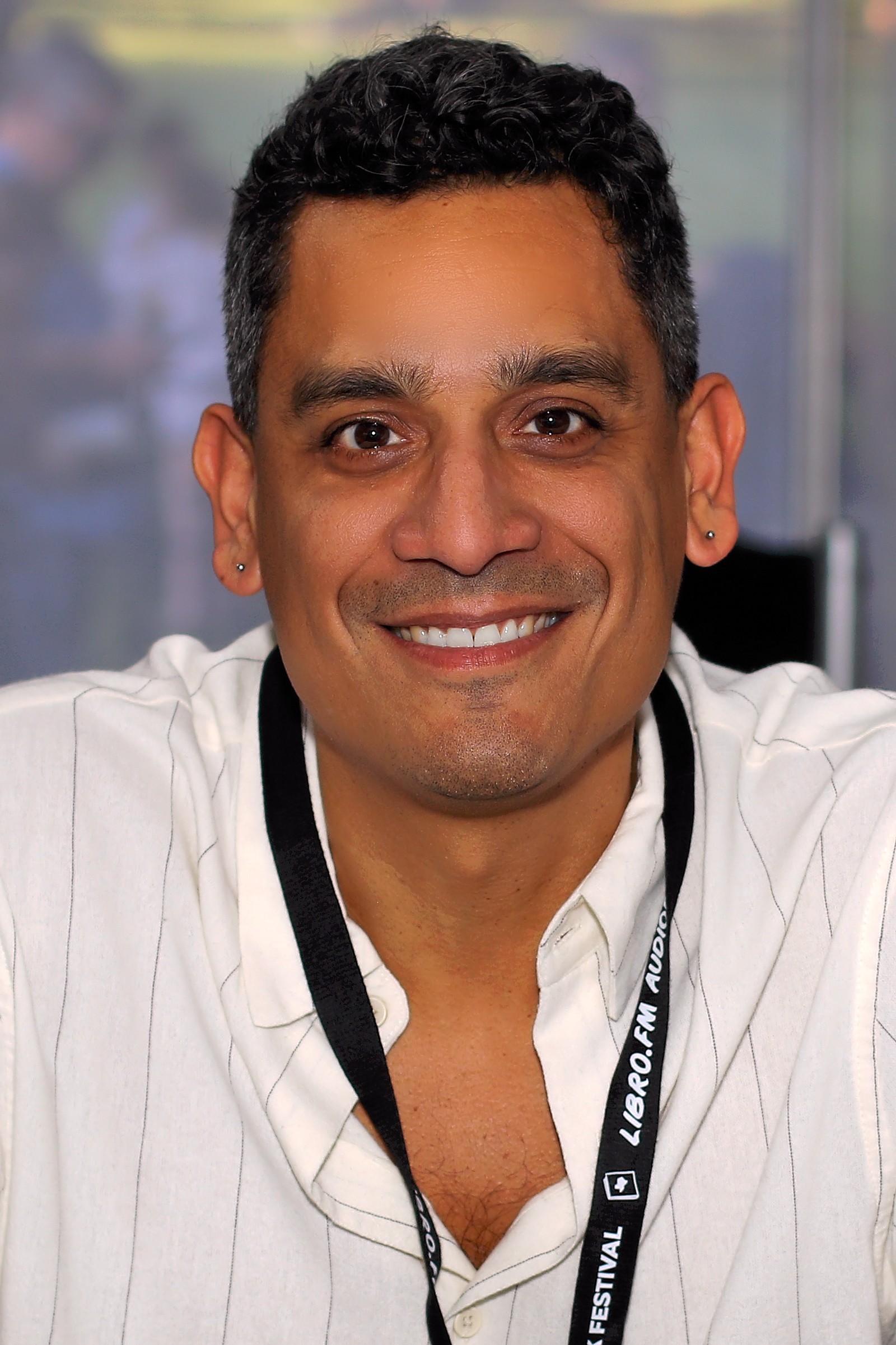
- Varela at the 2025 Texas Book Festival
- Born: 1979 (age 46–47); New York City, U.S.
- Occupation: Author
- Notable work: The Town of Babylon (2022)
- Website: alejandrovarela.work

Alejandro Varela (born 1979) is an American fiction writer. His novel The Town of Babylon was a finalist for a National Book Award for Fiction in 2022.

== Career ==
Varela graduated from Cornell with a Bachelor of Arts and the University of Washington with a Masters in Public Health. After graduating, he worked on an HIV study for the New York City Blood Center and managed cancer screening studies at Mount Sinai in Manhattan. Varela taught graduate-level public health policy and advocacy at Long Island University before beginning to write full time. He has published short stories in The Yale Review, The Georgia Review, and Harper's Magazine.

Varela was working in a skyscraper two blocks way from the World Trade Center on September 11, 2001. He detailed his experience on that day to Nicole Chung in The Atlantic, "I don’t know when the nightmares started, but after that, it was a long time before I could fly again."

Varela's debut novel, The Town of Babylon, was published in 2022, and was a finalist for the National Book Award for Fiction. The judges for the award said, "With this urgent, vivid novel, Varela has given us a modern classic and an indelible portrait of our times."

His second book, The People Who Report More Stress, a short story collection, was published in 2023. The New York Times called it "a master class in analyzing the unspoken... Varela illuminates our society’s Gordian knots with a seemingly effortless wit and empathy." The book was longlisted for the Aspen Words Literary Prize.

Varela's third book, Middle Spoon, a novel, was published in 2025. The Boston Globe described it as "...[a] decidedly modern examination of polyamory, family, individual neurosis, and pop culture. A multifaceted gem of a novel."

== Personal ==
Varela is gay and lives in New York City. His parents are from Colombia and El Salvador.

== Awards and honors ==
=== Literary prizes ===
Year	Work	Awards	Category	Results	Ref.
2022	The Town of Babylon	National Book Award	Fiction	Finalist	
2023	The Town of Babylon	Aspen Words Literary Prize	—	Longlisted	
2023	The Town of Babylon	PEN Open Book Award	—	Longlisted	
2023	The Town of Babylon	International Latino Book Awards	The Isabel Allende Award	Finalist	
2023	The Town of Babylon	International Latino Book Awards	Best First Book - Fiction	Finalist	
2023	The People Who Report More Stress	Aspen Words Literary Prize	—	Longlisted	
2023	The People Who Report More Stress	International Latino Book Awards	Short Stories	Silver Medal	
2023	The People Who Report More Stress	The Story Prize	—	Longlisted	
2024	The People Who Report More Stress	PEN/Jean Stein Book Award	—	Longlisted	
2025	Middle Spoon	Joyce Carol Oates Literary Prize		Longlisted	

== Bibliography ==
- —— (2022). The Town of Babylon. Astra House. ISBN 9781662601033.
- —— (2023). The People Who Report More Stress: Stories. Astra House. ISBN 9781662601071.
- —— (2025). Middle Spoon. New York: Viking. ISBN 9780593835173.
