= Dawnie Walton =

American journalist and novelist

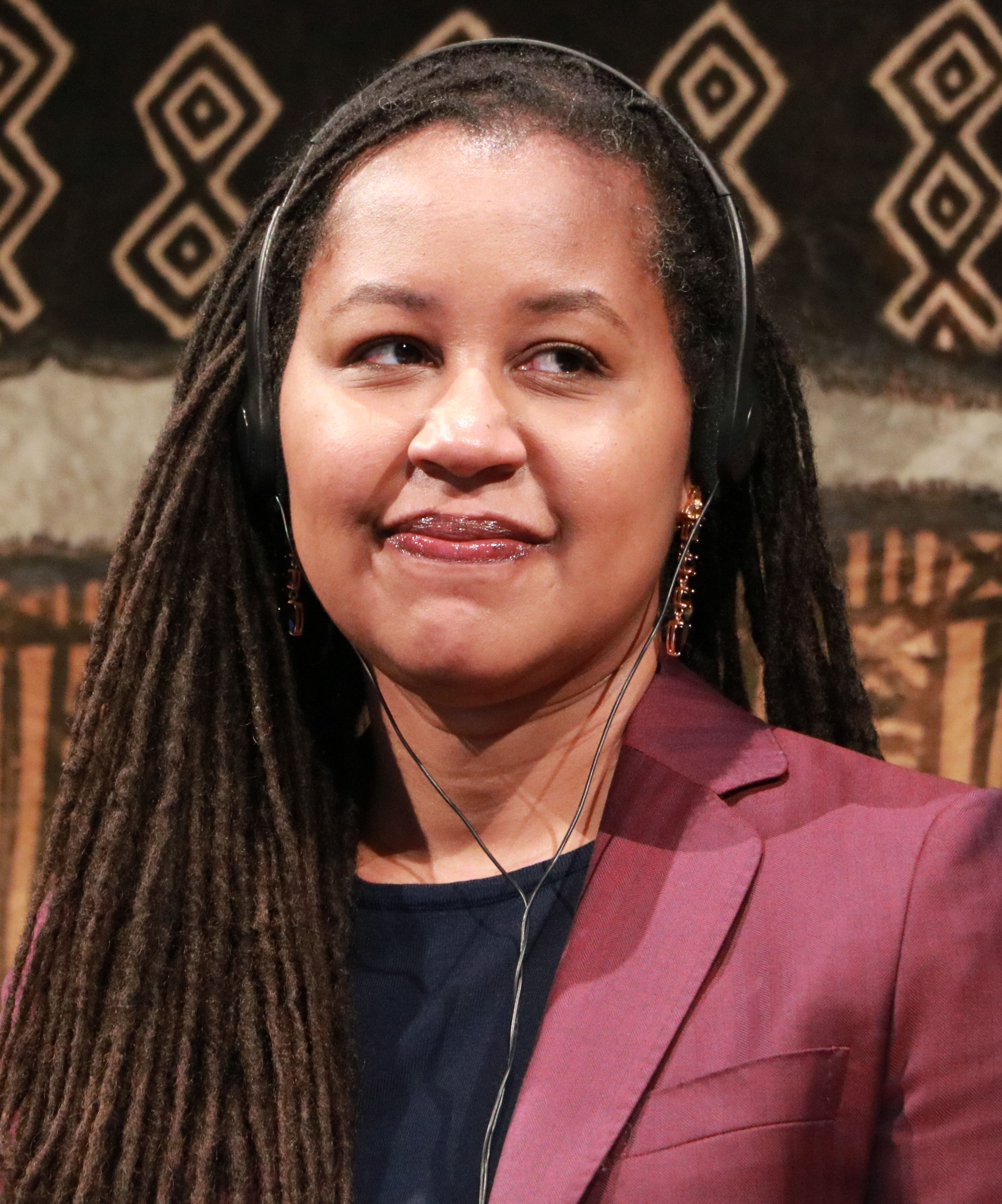
- Dawnie Walton in 2024
- Education: University of Iowa
- Occupations: Novelist; journalist
- Writing career
- Notable work: The Final Revival of Opal & Nev
- Notable awards: Aspen Words Literary Prize (2022)
- Website: dawniewalton.com

Dawnie Walton (born 1976 or 1977) is an American journalist and novelist. She is known for her novel, The Final Revival of Opal & Nev, which won the 2022 Aspen Words Literary Prize and the 2022 VCU Cabell First Novelist Award, and was longlisted for the Women's Prize for Fiction.

== Education and life ==
Walton was born in the 1970s and grew up in Jacksonville, Florida, where she attended Stanton College Preparatory School. She went to college at Florida A&M University in Tallahassee, a historically Black university, and she received her MFA from the Iowa Writers' Workshop.

She lives in Brooklyn with her husband.

== Career ==
=== Journalism ===
In 1994, Walton began her career in journalism after graduating high school interning for The Florida Times-Union — she wrote for the Teen Rap section of the paper that existed at the time. Her journalism career continued after college at The Oregonian in Portland and The Washington Post in D.C. She then moved to New York City, where she worked as a magazine editor for a number of publications, including Essence, Entertainment Weekly, Getty Images, and LIFE.

=== Writing ===
Walton published her debut novel, The Final Revival of Opal & Nev, in 2021 to critical acclaim. The book covers the fictionalized oral history of a 1970s interracial rock duo. She was inspired to write the book after seeing the documentary 20 Feet from Stardom about backing vocalists. It features Lynn Mabry and Ednah Holt singing with the Talking Heads.

Walton wrote this novel over seven years, for much of that time working on it before or after her day job. Walton was working as the deputy managing editor at Essence in 2015 when she decided to leave her job to work on the novel full-time.

While working on this novel, Walton attended writing residencies at MacDowell Colony and the Tin House Summer Workshop, and she received her Master of Fine Arts degree from the Iowa Writers' Workshop in 2013.

The novel won the 2022 VCU Cabell First Novelist Award, the 2022 Mark Twain American Voice in Literature Award, and the 2022 Aspen Words Literary Prize. The book was named one of the best books of 2021 by The Washington Post, NPR, Esquire, and Barack Obama. The audiobook version of the novel won the 2022 Audie Award for Fiction.

=== Short story startup ===
After publishing her first novel, Walton co-founded a new startup with Longreads founder Mark Armstrong and author Deesha Philyaw. The startup, called Ursa, aims to celebrate and promote short fiction by underrepresented authors through a website, a podcast, and publishing—including publishing audio stories. Walton and Philyaw host the podcast together.

== Awards and honors ==
In 2021, Barack Obama and Booklist included The Final Revival of Opal & Nev on their lists of the year's best books.

Awards for Walton's writing
Year	Title	Award	Category	Result	Ref.
2021	The Final Revival of Opal & Nev	Brooklyn Public Library Literary Prize	Fiction	Longlisted	
2021	The Final Revival of Opal & Nev	Goodreads Choice Award	Debut Novel	Nominated—13th	
2021	The Final Revival of Opal & Nev	Goodreads Choice Award	Historical Fiction	Nominated—13th	
2022	The Final Revival of Opal & Nev	Aspen Words Literary Prize	—	Won	
2022	The Final Revival of Opal & Nev	Audie Award	Best Fiction	Won	
2022	The Final Revival of Opal & Nev	First Novelist Award	—	Won	
2022	The Final Revival of Opal & Nev	Hurston/Wright Legacy Award	—	Nominated	
2022	The Final Revival of Opal & Nev	Mark Twain American Voice in Literature Award	—	Won	
2022	The Final Revival of Opal & Nev	Women's Prize for Fiction	—	Longlisted	

== Publications ==
- The Final Revival of Opal & Nev (2021)
