= Migrations (novel) =

2020 novel by Charlotte McConaghy

Migrations is a 2020 climate dystopian adventure novel by Charlotte McConaghy, first published by Flatiron Books in the US. Since then the novel has been translated into multiple languages such as German, Polish, Finnish and Swedish. By Chatto & Windus in the UK, as well as some other publications, the novel is called The Last Migration.

== Plot summary ==
Four years ago Fanny Lynch was in a car crash. She wanted to destroy herself but accidentally killed her husband and an innocent woman instead. In order to be punished, she confessed to murder. 12 months ago she was released on parole and a promise to stay in Ireland. Her husband's mom shows her his grave and she finds out how he actually wanted to rest. He wanted his ashes scattered with the arctic terns.

Fanny travels to Greenland to mark terns so she can follow them on their final migration to Antarctica and scatter her husband's ashes there. She meets the crew of a fishing boat named the Shaghani at a pub. After some persuasion she manages to get Ennis, the captain, to let her join them at sea.

On the boat she practices knots and other necessities when fishing. She feels at peace working hard because her head shuts up and she is able to sleep.

After a few weeks at sea a storm picks up and one of the crew members is hit by a cable which causes his heart to stop beating. Thanks to a defibrillator he survives but needs care. He is from Newfoundland, so they change course to take him to a hospital. When they go ashore she notices a man looking at her strangely.

During their stay the authorities prohibit fishing due to shortage of fish in the oceans. When Fanny leaves a bar she sees the man that looked at her strangely when they arrived. He pulls her into a dark street and tries to rape her because of what she and “her” crew do to the seas. However, she kicks him which makes him loosen his grip on her. She pulls out a knife from her shoe and stabs him in the neck. Ennis arrives and drags her away and towards the boat and they, together with the rest of the crew, flee.

Back at sea, they have a problem, things break and they cannot stop anywhere because of the new rules. Everything falls apart - the autopilot, navigation, water pumps and the computer she tracks the terns on. After a while they have no choice but to stop at a port. When they do, the police arrive and search for Fanny but the crew covers for her so she and Ennis jump into the water and swim to the shore.

At the shore they steal a yacht and continue to Antarctica.

They reach Antarctica’s coast and travel along it but eventually the yacht will not carry them any further. They walk on the ice during the final stretch of their journey. On the third day they are met with hundreds of terns covering the ice in front of them. Ennis starts to walk back to the boat so she can spread the ashes and say farewell in peace. She spreads the ashes as her husband wished. Afterwards she slides in the cold water with the purpose to die. In the water she changes her mind when she hears her husband's voice inside her head. She will show her husband that some endangered animals can be saved, because it is not over. A helicopter saves her.

Six years later she is released from prison a second time and drives to Scotland with her dad.

== Development history ==
Charlotte McConaghy had only written young-adult novels before she wrote Migrations, and felt stuck in her writing. She travelled to Iceland and was inspired by nature and the climate changes that made themself visible. She saw when ice fell from the glaciers and was captivated by it. When she got home from the trip, she started writing and did not stop for 2 ½ years.

She says “I was in Ireland when the ides for The Last Migration first came to me. The landscapes are so inspiring, and the arts culture is such a joy! I realised I wanted to try my hand at something very different – a novel for adults.”

In an interview with the Los Angeles Times she said that she sometimes when writing reminded herself of her reason for writing the novel: “I was getting to a place of hope. I wanted to energize people and myself to come out of the other side of despair and apathy and into a place of hope, love, and action.”

== Literary significance and reception ==
The Guardian’s Fiona Wright writes a mixed, but mostly positive review :

“The broody, otherworldly quality of the book’s atmosphere, but it does, at times, begin to feel a bit laboured and mannered – especially as the novel progresses. So too is there a neatness to the ending that seems an uncomfortable fit with the ambiguity and slipperiness of the rest of the book.” despite that she thinks “The Last Migration is nonetheless an aching and poignant book, and one that’s pressing in its timeliness. It’s often devastating in its depictions of grief, especially the wider, harder to grasp grief of living in a world that has changed catastrophically, where governments and scientists are scrambling to ameliorate what harm they can – choosing, for example, which particular animals are the most important to try to save (pollinators, like insects and bats), and which to let disappear forever.”

Hillary Kelly for the Los Angeles Times: “McConaghy has a gift for sketching out enveloping, memorable characters using only the smallest of strokes, which makes Franny’s time with the crew of the Saghani the novel’s strongest and most vibrant thread.”

Michael Christie for The New York Times: “Migrations” is a nervy and well-crafted novel, one that lingers long after its voyage is over. It's a story about our mingling sorrows, both personal and global, and the survivor’s guilt that will be left in their wake.” and “This novel’s prose soars with its transporting descriptions of the planet’s landscapes and their dwindling inhabitants, and contains many wonderful meditations on our responsibilities to our earthly housemates.”

== Awards and nominations ==
- Migrations was nominated for the Dublin Literary Award in 2022.
- Migrations is in second place on “Amazon Editor’s Best books of 2020.
- Migrations is on TIME Magazine’s “The 100 Must-Read Books of 2020”.
