= Jennifer Maritza McCauley =

American writer

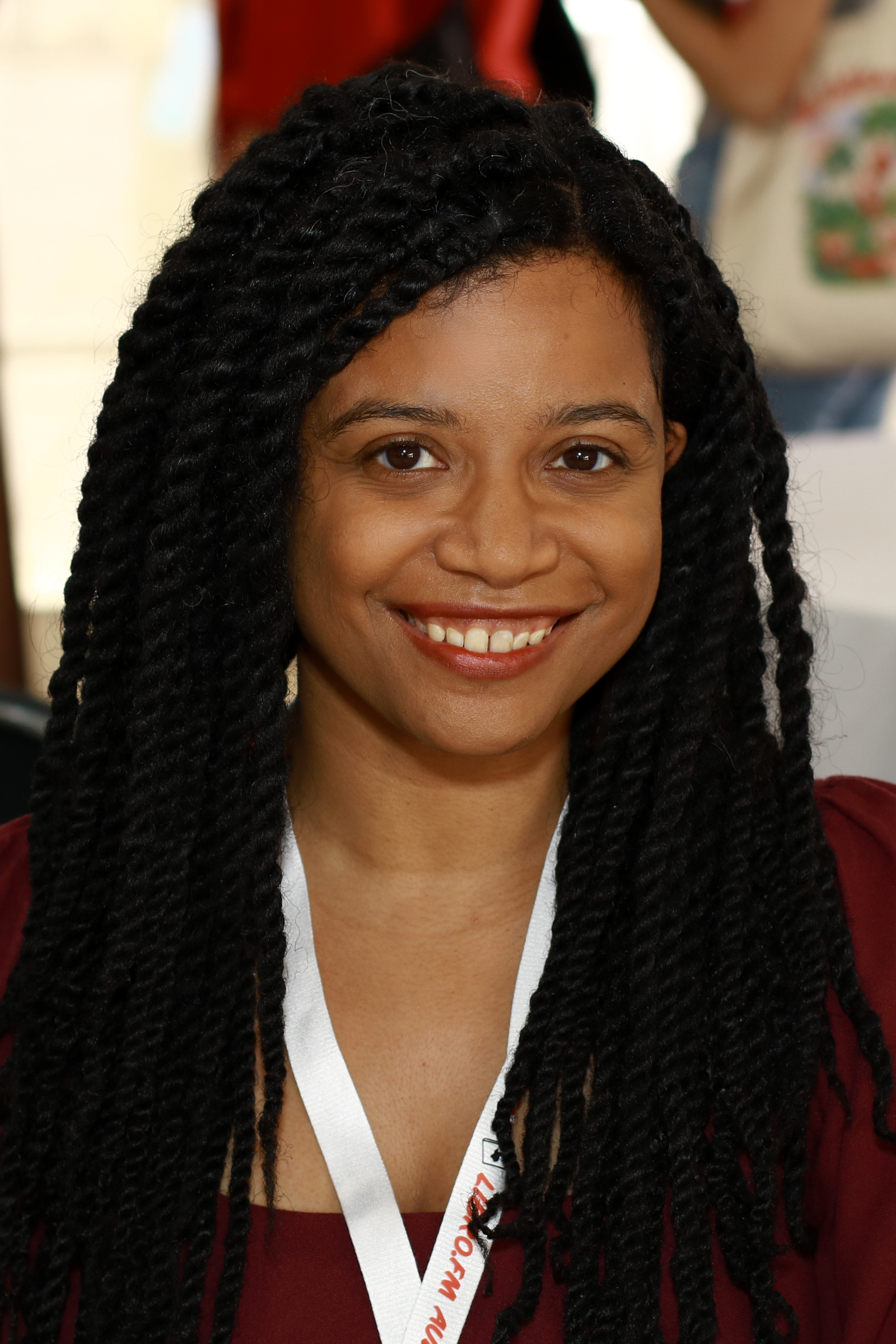
- McCauley at the 2024 Texas Book Festival.
- Born: Pittsburgh, Pennsylvania, U.S.
- Education: University of Pittsburgh (BA); Florida International University (MFA); University of Missouri (PhD)
- Occupation: Writer
- Website: www.jennifermaritzamccauley.com

Jennifer Maritza McCauley is an American writer.

Born and raised in Pittsburgh, Pennsylvania, Jennifer Maritza McCauley is the daughter of a Black American father and a Puerto Rican mother. She graduated from the University of Pittsburgh with a BA in English Writing, with an MFA in fiction from Florida International University, and she received a PhD in creative writing and literature from University of Missouri.

McCauley received a National Endowment for the Arts fellowship in 2018 and her short story collection When Trying to Return Home was longlisted for the 2024 Aspen Words Literary Prize.

== Works ==
- —— (2026). Neon Steel (paperback 1st ed.). Stevens Point: Cornerstone. ISBN 9781968148232.
- —— (2016). Scar On/Scar Off (paperback 1st ed.). Santa Fe: Stalking Horse Press. ISBN 9780999115206.
- —— (2023). When Trying to Return Home (hardcover 1st ed.). Counterpoint Press. ISBN 9781640095687.
- —— (2024). Kinds of Grace (paperback 1st ed.). FlowerSong Press. ISBN 9781963245288.
