= I, the Divine: A Novel in First Chapters =

- Author: Rabih Alameddine
- Language: English
- Publication date: 2001

I, the Divine: A Novel in First Chapters is a 2001 novel by American writer Rabih Alameddine.
