= Abundance (novel) =

2021 novel by Jakob Guanzon

- First edition (publ. Graywolf Press)
- Author: Jakob Guanzon
- Language: English
- Publisher: Graywolf Press
- Publication date: 2021

Abundance is a 2021 novel by Jakob Guanzon about wealth inequality and human worth. It was published by Greywolf Press and is Guanzon's first novel. It covers concepts including inherited medical debt, poverty, food security, criminal justice system, and illegal drug trade. In 2021, the novel was longlisted for the National Book Award for Fiction and the Aspen Words Literary Prize.
