= Memorial (novel) =

2020 debut novel by Bryan Washington

- First edition cover
- Author: Bryan Washington
- Audio read by: Bryan Washington; Akie Kotabe
- Language: English
- Set in: Houston and Osaka
- Publisher: Riverhead Books
- Publication date: October 27, 2020
- Publication place: United States
- Media type: Print (hardcover), e-book, audiobook
- Pages: 320
- ISBN: 978-0-593-08727-5 (hardcover)
- OCLC: 1128065538
- Dewey Decimal: 813/.6
- LC Class: PS3623.A86737 M46 2020
- Website: brywashing.com/memorial/

Memorial is the debut novel by Bryan Washington. It was published by Riverhead Books on October 27, 2020, to acclaim from book critics.

== Plot ==
Benson lives with Mike in Houston. Mike goes to Osaka to take care of his estranged father who is dying. Meanwhile, Mike's mother Mitsuko is visiting and staying at his place in Houston, with Benson.

== Characters ==
- Benson – Black day care teacher
- Mike – Japanese-American chef at a Mexican restaurant
- Mitsuko – Mike's mother
- Eiju – Mike's father
- Lydia – Benson's sister

== Reception ==
In its starred review, Kirkus Reviews called it "vividly written" and wrote, "Washington's novel is richly layered and thrives in the quiet moments between lovers and family members." In its starred review, Publishers Weekly wrote that Washington applied "nuance in equal measure to his characters and the places they're tied to". Michael Schaub of NPR called the novel a "masterpiece" and praised Washington's "ability to draw the reader's attention to what's not said as much as what is". Ron Charles of The Washington Post praised the novel's narration, writing, "Washington inhabits these two men so naturally that the sophistication of this form is rendered entirely invisible, and their narratives unspool as spontaneously and clearly as late-night conversation."

In December 2020, Emily Temple of Literary Hub reported that the novel had made 14 lists of the best books of 2020. The following year, it was longlisted for the Aspen Words Literary Prize.

== Awards and nominations ==
- Longlist, 2021 Andrew Carnegie Medal for Excellence in Fiction
- Longlist, 2021 Aspen Words Literary Prize
- Honor, 2021 Stonewall Book Award - Barbara Gittings Literature Award Honor

== Television adaptation ==
On October 13, 2020, A24 announced it had purchased the rights to adapt the novel for television, with Washington adapting his novel.
