= The Final Revival of Opal & Nev =

2021 historical fiction novel by Dawnie Walton

- Author: Dawnie Walton
- Audio read by: Janina Edwards, Bahni Turpin, James Langton, Gabra Zackman, Dennis Boutsikaris, Steve West, André De Shields, Matthew Lloyd Davies, David Sadzin, Fiona Hardingham, George Newbern, Leon Nixon, Ines del Castillo, Jackie Sanders, Pete Simonelli, Priya Ayyar, and Robin Miles
- Language: English
- Genre: Historical fiction
- Publisher: 37 INK
- Publication date: March 30, 2021
- Media type: Print
- Pages: 368
- ISBN: 9781982140168

The Final Revival of Opal & Nev is a 2021 historical fiction novel by Dawnie Walton published by 37 Ink. It received the 2022 Virginia Commonwealth University, Cabell First Novelist Award, the 2022 Aspen Words Literary Prize, and was nominated for the Women's Prize for Fiction.

== Reception ==
=== Reviews ===
The Final Revival Of Opal & Nev was well-received by critics, including starred reviews from Booklist, Library Journal, and Publishers Weekly.

Multiple reviewers highlighted aspects of the novel related to race and gender. Kirkus Reviews called the book an "intelligently executed love letter to Black female empowerment and the world of rock music," while Publishers Weekly called it "a firecracker," saying, "Walton pumps up the volume with a fresh angle on systemic racism and freedom of expression." Booklist said it is a "cinematic, stereophonic, and boldly imagined story of race, gender, and agency in art." NPR's Maureen Corrigan noted, "The Final Revival of Opal & Nev is itself anything but 'regular.' A deep dive into the recent past, [the novel] also simultaneously manages to be a rumination on up-to-the-minute themes like cultural appropriation in music, and the limits of white allyship." Writing for The Washington Post Danielle Evans wrote, "It is refreshing to read a book that centers a Black woman who has this many layers, a book that seeks neither to save her from nor punish her for the flaws that make her human."

Reviewers also commented on the book's realism. Library Journal wrote, "The characters seem so real that readers will find themselves searching the internet, hoping to find that Opal and Nev are actual people. Walton has penned a true wonder of a debut novel, bringing real events into her story." Corrigan indicated that she "had to stop and double check to make sure that this wasn't a true account of a real-life rock duo from the 1970s." The New York Times Book Review said the book "feels truer and more mesmerizing than some true stories."

Also highlighted was Walton's writing style and the atypical format of the book. Entertainment Weekly explained, "Walton's debut novel uses oral history as the form for her kaleidoscopic tale, though she can hardly be contained by it. The book bursts with fourth wall breaks and clear-eyed takes on race, sex, and creativity that Walton unfurls in urgent, endlessly readable style." Library Journal said, "Walton has a true storytelling voice, and her writing is impeccable. The New York Times Book Review said the book is "[i]ngeniously structured."

=== Awards and honors ===
In 2021, Barack Obama and Booklist included The Final Revival of Opal & Nev on their list of the year's best books.

In 2022, Walton won the VCU Cabell First Novelist Award for The Final Revival of Opal & Nev.

Awards for The Final Revival of Opal & Nev
Year	Award	Result	Ref.
2021	Brooklyn Public Library Literary Prize for Fiction	Longlisted	
2021	Goodreads Choice Award for Debut Novel	Nominated	
2021	Goodreads Choice Award for Historical Fiction	Nominated	
2022	Aspen Words Literary Prize	Won	
2022	Audie Award for Best Fiction	Won	
2022	First Novelist Award	Won	
2022	Hurston/Wright Legacy Award	Nominated	
2022	Mark Twain American Voice in Literature Award	Won	
2022	Women's Prize for Fiction	Longlisted	
