= Charlotte McConaghy =

Australian writer

- Born: 1988 (age 37–38); Darwin, Northern Territory, Australia
- Citizenship: Australian
- Occupations: Novelist and screenwriter
- Writing career
- Notable work: Wild Dark Shore (2025)
- Website: charlottemcconaghy.com

Charlotte McConaghy is an Australian novelist and screenwriter. She is the author of Migrations (2020), Once There Were Wolves (2021), and Wild Dark Shore (2025). Her novels explore subjects related to the climate.

McConaghy attended the Australian Film, Television and Radio School, from which she received a master's degree in 2012.

== Awards and honours ==
Once There Were Wolves and Wild Dark Shore were New York Times bestselling novels.

Awards for McConaghy's work
Year	Title	Award	Result	Ref.
2022	Once There Were Wolves	Davitt Award for Best Adult Crime Novel	Winner	
2026	Wild Dark Shore	Aspen Words Literary Prize	Finalist	
2026	Wild Dark Shore	Stella Prize	Longlist	
2026	Wild Dark Shore	Women's Prize for Fiction	Longlist	
2026	Wild Dark Shore	Literary Fiction Book of the Year, Australian Book Industry Awards	Winner	

== Publications ==
- Migrations. Flatiron Books. 2020. ISBN 978-1-250-20402-8.
- Once There Were Wolves. Flatiron Books. 2021. ISBN 978-1-250-24414-7.
- Wild Dark Shore. Flatiron Books. 2025. ISBN 978-1-250-24414-7.
