= Afro-Hispanic Review =

English-Spanish academic journal

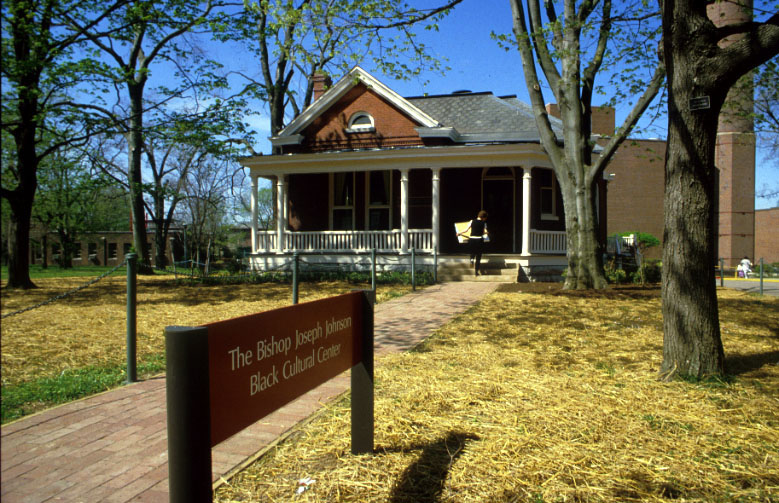
- The Bishop Joseph Johnson Black Cultural Center at Vanderbilt University, which houses the journal.
- Discipline: Afro-Hispanic studies
- Language: English, Spanish
- Edited by: William Luis

Publication details
- History: 1982–present
- Frequency: Biannually

Standard abbreviations
- ISO 4: Afro-Hisp. Rev.

Indexing
- ISSN: 0278-8969 (print); 2327-9648 (web)

Links
- Journal homepage

The Afro-Hispanic Review is an English-Spanish bilingual peer-reviewed academic journal published by Vanderbilt University's Department of Spanish and Portuguese and the Bishop Joseph Johnson Black Cultural Center. The journal focuses on the study of Afro-Latino literature and culture, both in the United States and internationally. Published twice annually, it has been described as the "premier literary journal in Afro-Hispanic studies." Its editor-in-chief is William Luis (Vanderbilt University).

The journal was established in January 1982 at Howard University, with Stanley Cyrus as its founding editor. Beginning in 1986, it was published at the University of Missouri, as a collaboration between the departments of Black studies and Romance languages. It was transferred to Vanderbilt and its Bishop Joseph Johnson Black Cultural Center in 2005.
