= Brian Allen Carr =

American writer (born 1979)

- Born: 1979 (age 46–47); Austin, Texas
- Occupation: Writer
- Writing career
- Genre: Literary fiction
- Website: shortbusbook.com

Brian Allen Carr (born 1979 in Austin, Texas) is an American writer. He is the author of the short story collection Short Bus (2011) and was the winner of the inaugural Texas Observer Story Prize as judged by Larry McMurtry in 2011. Carr was also a finalist for the 2011 Texas Institute of Letters Steven Turner Award for First Fiction. His stories have appeared in Annalemma, Boulevard, Fiction International, Hobart, Keyhole, and Texas Review, among other publications.

== Bibliography ==
- Short Bus (2011, Texas Review Press)
- Vampire Conditions (2012, Holler Presents)
- Edie & the Low-Hung Hands (2013, Small Doggie Press)
- Motherfucking Sharks (2013, Lazy Fascist Press)
- The Last Horror Novel in the History of the World (2014, Lazy Fascist Press)
- Sip (2017, Soho Press)
- Opioid, Indiana (2019, Soho Press)
- Bad Foundations (2024, CLASH Books)
