= Hermione Hoby =

British writer

- Born: 1985 (age 40–41)
- Occupations: Novelist, journalist, critic
- Writing career
- Language: English
- Notable work: Neon in Daylight

Hermione Hoby (born 1985) is a British author, journalist, and cultural critic. As a journalist, she writes on books, music, theatre and feminism. She is the author of the novels Neon in Daylight and Virtue.

== Early and personal life ==
Hoby was born and raised in South London. She is named for the character Hermione in Shakespeare's The Winter's Tale. She studied at Pembroke College, Cambridge, and graduated in English literature in 2007.

== Career ==
Hoby worked at The Guardian until moving to New York City in 2010 to become a freelance culture writer. She has profiled writers, actors, musicians, and other public figures, including Toni Morrison, Naomi Campbell, and Meryl Streep.

In 2016, Hoby began writing "Stranger of the Week", a column for The Awl, in which she observed the wider state of culture, life, and politics based on character studies culled from real-life encounters.

=== Neon in Daylight ===
Published on 1 January 2018 by Catapult, Hoby's debut novel, Neon in Daylight, is set in New York during the months leading up to Hurricane Sandy. The book follows the intertwining lives of a middle-aged writer, his rebellious daughter, and a newly transplanted English woman. Reviewing the novel in the Los Angeles Review of Books, Bradley Babendir called it "luminous and wonderful...[Hoby's] style has a delicious, raucous quality." In The New York Times, Parul Sehgal compared Neon in Daylight to Joan Didion's Play It as It Lays, writing, "precision—of observation, of language—is Hoby's gift. Her sentences are sleek and tailored. Language molds snugly to thought." The book was named recommended reading by Vanity Fair, Fast Company, and Bustle.

==== Virtue ====
Published on 20 July 2021 by Riverhead, with advance praise from Rachel Kushner, Jia Tolentino, Leslie Jamison and others, Hoby's second novel is narrated by a young man arriving in New York internship at an elite but fading magazine. The novel follows his relationships with an attractive and wealthy white couple—Paula, a prominent artist, and Jason, her filmmaker husband—and his fellow intern, Zara. The New York Times called it "intense and addictive . . . With a touch as light as a single match, Hoby scorches the earth beneath hollow social activism and performative outrage." Sigrid Nunez reviewed the novel for The New York Review of Books, writing, "I took such delight in Hoby's prose. ... Luca and Paula and Jason are skillfully drawn, each possessing a distinctive, nuanced personality and a complicated psyche, and Hoby's gift for sensual description makes us feel we know them viscerally." The novel was shortlisted for the 2022 Mark Twain American Voice in Literature Award.
