= Koolaids: The Art of War =

1998 novel by Rabih Alameddine

- Cover of the first edition
- Author: Rabih Alameddine
- Language: English
- Genre: Novel
- Publisher: Picador
- Publication date: 15 April 1998
- Publication place: United States
- Media type: Print (Hardback & Paperback)
- Pages: 256 pp
- ISBN: 0-312-18693-2
- OCLC: 38200152
- Dewey Decimal: 813/.54 21
- LC Class: PS3551.L215 K6 1998

Koolaids: The Art of War is a novel by Rabih Alameddine, an author and painter who lives in both San Francisco and Beirut. He grew up in the Middle East, in Kuwait and Lebanon. Published in 1998, Koolaids is Alameddine's first novel. The majority of the story takes place in San Francisco and Beirut, the sites of two very different "wars". San Francisco from the mid-1980s into the 1990s is the main site of the AIDS epidemic, especially among the gay community, while Beirut is the site of a brutal civil war.

== Plot summary ==
The novel deals with issues such as the AIDS epidemic, sex, the Lebanese civil war, death, and the meaning of life. It is a postmodern novel told from the point of view of numerous narrators. Koolaids breaks from the traditional novel style in that the whole book is a non-linear narrative. Koolaids is written in a creative style, with short paragraphs and sentences that have deep meanings. In fact, the whole novel is a series of short sections, or vignettes. Each vignette is part of a stream of consciousness from one of the multiple narrators. The different types of vignettes include diary entries, e-mails, newspaper articles, holy texts/prayers, and dialogues to name a few. Also, there is a multitude of characters who make quick appearances in different spots throughout the novel. The randomness and fragments of thought add to the overall theme of chaos, and the meaninglessness of everything in life. The main sub-themes of the novel are death, AIDS, war, art, and violence. The novel also offers narratives on the inadequate representation of the realities of AIDS and the Lebanon civil war in the mass media. Alameddine achieves this by citing fictional examples told from the first person point of view on the exploitation of the sick and the disregard for human life in war. These examples help reflect the insufficiency of monolithic narratives of AIDS and war. Often, people's harrowing personal experiences are not accounted for in the news or in history books. Alameddine's central purpose for this novel is to portray the meaninglessness of life and to show that the only thing that is certain in life is death.

== Characters ==
In Koolaids, Rabih Alameddine includes numerous characters that are connected through a series of short narrations. There are four main narrators, Mohammad, Samir, Samir's mother, and Kurt, that the readers are introduced to. The narrations seem to be laid out sporadically because Alameddine alternates between each of these four, and they are not given in chronological order. He also includes several subplots and various vignettes. Although the narrators are the main characters of the book, there are several dialogues in which celebrities interact with gods from other cultures. These correspond to the randomness of the passages well. A recurring trend with most of the characters is that they die throughout the course of this novel; the main causes of death being AIDS or the violence of the war. None of Alameddine's characters have ever existed, and as a confirmation, the author did state, “I anticipate readers who will imagine characters herein to correspond to real persons. They do not. Everything is a creation of my twisted imagination” (vii).

=== Narrators ===
- Mohammad: Arguably the main narrator of the four in this book. His narration is the first of the four narrators the reader encounters in the beginning, and also the last of the four at the end of the story. Other characters view him as a man with a sense of humor and a dynamic personality. He is a talented, famous Lebanese-American artist that has been diagnosed with the HIV/AIDS virus. Mohammad is a gay character that uses his talent of painting to cope with the war and other conflicts that he faces in his life. He creates both abstract and realistic works, but the book focuses mainly on his paintings of the villages in Lebanon. He is the only character that directly communicates with the reader at times in his narrations, allowing the audience to assume that it is indeed him that is the backbone of the novel. For example, there are several instances in which he talks about wanting to write a book. “When I first started seeing my friends die, I wanted to write a book where all the characters died in the beginning, say in the first twenty-five pages or so” (18). Through this quote, the reader can infer that Alameddine created Mohammed as a character that is somewhat in his image.
- Samir Bashar: Samir's full name is Emir Samir Basil Bashar. He was also a gay character that was born in Washington, D.C. and has been infected with the HIV/AIDS virus. He is of Lebanese descent and moved to Beirut soon after his birth until he went to college in France, then returned to Washington, D.C. for graduate school. Through his narrative, it seems as though he is focused mainly on his individual identity, his prized national identity, and finding the meaning of his life and life in general.
- Samir's Mother: A Lebanese woman who lives in Beirut, and whose contribution to this book is her diary entries. Though she remains nameless, one can assume that she is Samir's mother because of the events that she addresses in her entries, and the countless times in which she refers to Samir. Her story is one of the few that, though the entries are sporadic, remains in chronological order. Her main focus is generally of the violence, death, and war that affect her and her family and also the AIDS virus that is having a major impact on her son. Alameddine introduces her as a compassionate individual who engages the readers through introducing controversial issues and posing poignant questions.
- Kurt: A gay character that has a positive view on his life and a firm belief in an afterlife. He has also been a victim of the HIV/AIDS virus. After being diagnosed with this virus, other characters noted a change in his personality. He took up painting and searched desperately for Mohammad's approval of his work. It wasn't until he experienced the pain of his mother passing away that Mohammad felt that he had talent and he soon became a well-respected artist as well.

=== Characters in dialogues ===
These dialogues between famous people from different cultures take place four different times throughout the novel. In each of these dialogues, there are six characters that appear every time, Arjuna, Krsna, Eleanor Roosevelt, Krishnamurti, Julio Cortázar, and Tom Cruise. Other characters that are seen in these dialogues are Jesus, Mame Dennis, and Jalaleddine Rumi. The main theme of each of these dialogues is the search for the meaning of life. Before each of the dialogues, the same phrase appears, “An hour later. Arjuna and his charioteer, Krsna, on the battlefield. They are now joined by Eleanor Roosevelt, Krishnamurti, Julio Cortázar, and Tom Cruise, who looks a little lost” (37).

- Arjuna- Hindu warrior prince from the Mahābhārata. His major dilemma is regarding the purpose of war. His character closely relates to the book because he is constantly in search of the meaning of life and war, much like Alameddine's main theme throughout the novel.
- Krsna- Arjuna's charioteer who guided him and provided him with spiritual teachings through a war.
- Eleanor Roosevelt- (1884–1962) Wife of President Franklin D. Roosevelt and First Lady of the United States from 1933 to 1945.

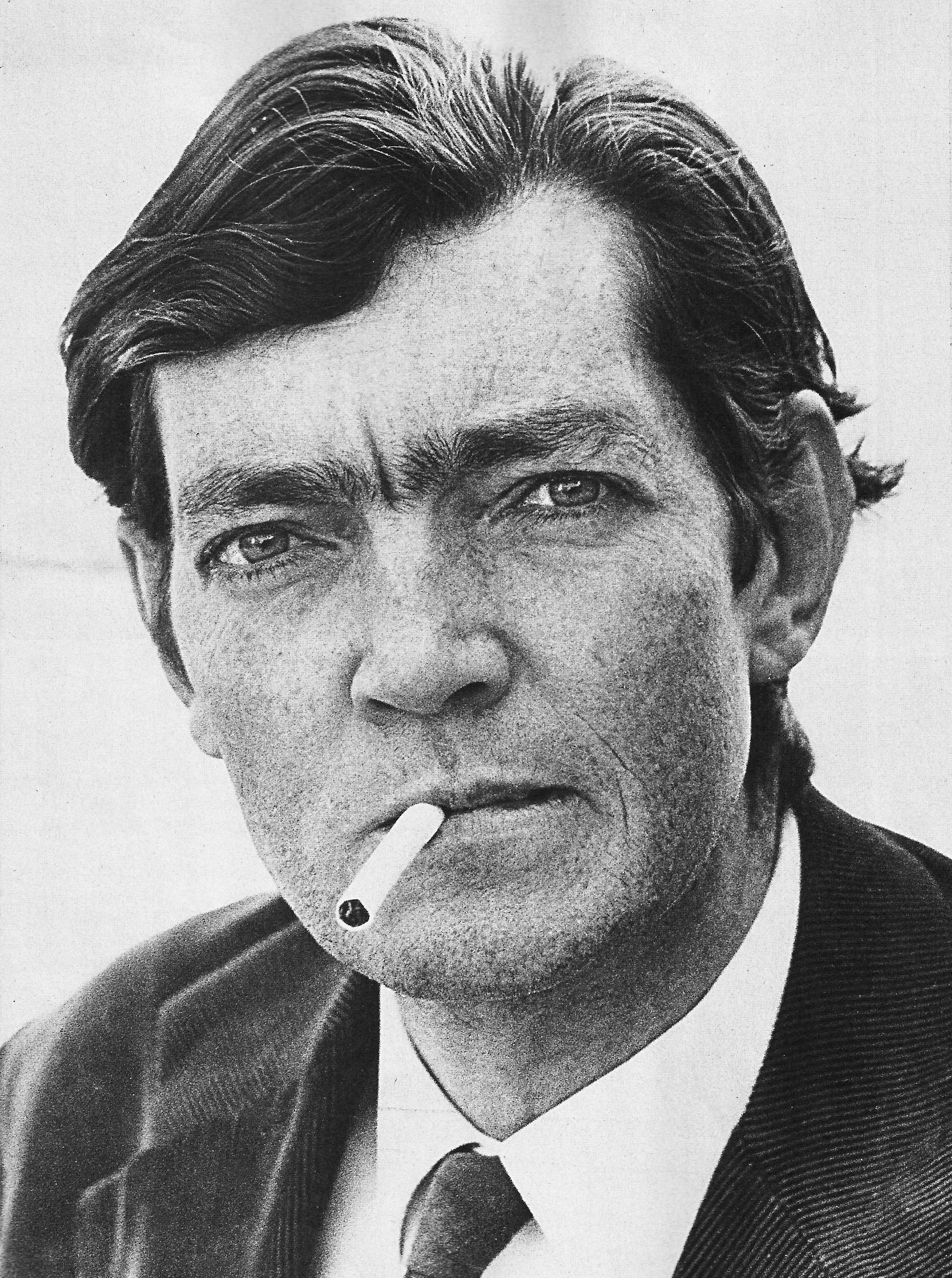
Julio Cortázar

- Krishnamurti- (1895–1986) Full name is Jiddu Krishnamurti. He is well known for his philosophies regarding the mind and human relationships.
- Julio Cortázar- (1914–1984) Argentine writer whose writing style is similar to Alameddine's in that it is known to “follow the logic of hallucinations and obsessions.” Recurring themes in his works are identity and reality. Cortázar is mentioned one other time in the novel (pages 105–107) where the author is having a conversation with him, and the reader is able to see how Alameddine feels that he relates to Cortázar.
- Tom Cruise- A celebrity who, in this novel, seemed to take on a role as being lost and somewhat unaware in the dialogues.
- Jesus- A prominent spiritual figure in several different religions. His role in these dialogues is to represent other religions that claim to have "the answer" to the meaning of life.
- Mame Dennis- The main character of a book by Patrick Dennis about a Bohemian woman living during the Great Depression. Alameddine uses her famous quote in one of the dialogues: "Life is a banquet and most poor suckers are starving to death" (137).
- Jalaleddine Rumi- (1207–1273) A well-known Persian poet that was seen as a spiritual guide. His full name is Mevlana Jalaleddine Rumi, and his main teachings were of peace and tolerance. Jalaleddine Rumi is referred to one other time in the book, when Alameddine directly states, "Jaleleddine Rumi wrote much better than I ever could, in the thirteenth century no less" (159).

=== Other important characters ===
In no particular order:

- Scott: Kurt's boyfriend, Mohammad's ex-boyfriend/best friend, AIDS victim
- Nawal: Mohammad's sister
- Marwa: Nawal's friend, a former neighbor from Beirut
- James: One of Mohammad's best friends
- Ben Baxter: Diagnosed with the AIDS virus and became what all characters agree to have been a bad painter
- Karim: Loved by Samir and was his best friend but died before any romantic relations could take place
- Mark: Samir's lover, also infected with HIV/AIDS
- Nick and Samia: the main characters of one of the very few heterosexual relations/affairs in this book. Their story is also one of the few that occurs in chronological order
- Georges: Lebanese man that introduced Samir to bisexuality
- Bashir Salaheddine: Samir's great-great uncle who supported and embraced Samir's homosexuality and confessed his being gay to Samir as well. The only time the reader is introduced to him is through his letter addressed to Samir.

== Themes and motifs ==
=== Death ===
The novel centers around wars in Lebanon as well as the AIDS epidemic in the United States, two fronts where death occurs on a regular basis. Alameddine talks about death in various ways, describing the deathbeds of those suffering from AIDS as well as the sometimes instant deaths of those in Lebanon. Alameddine talks about death in his novel often in peculiar ways, which is similar to the peculiar set up of the book. For instance, in three different cases Alameddine writes about death in very different ways. "I am back in Beirut. In a stable, hiding. He asks me what I am doing. I tell him I killed him. He is lying on the ground, dead. We both look at his body" (p. 75). In this vignette, which is almost a complete tangent, like many of the vignettes throughout the story are, the narrator has a dream in which he kills his father. This surreal experience is not uncommon throughout the book, nor is its correlation to death. The narrator seems to be almost fascinated at the sight of his dead father's body and the experience seems to be treated lightly. Often Alameddine treats situations of death with humor. This can be seen on page 158 where the narrator talks about a poem he wanted to write on his deathbed and then makes a comment about how he is unable to because he could not write as good as thirteenth century writer Jalaleddine Rumi. Another notion of death touched on in the novel is the idea of the living dead. On page 95 there is a vignette about an AIDS patient with a brainstem issue, with the narrator saying "Brain stem, you say? By that definition Juan should have been declared dead long before he even got to the hospital". Again on page 159 a similar scenario comes up. "Kurt was snoring. I sat next to his bed. I did not want to disturb him. He looked dead already. He opened his eyes suddenly." In these two quotes Alameddine brings up the idea of death as a subjective topic. In a way Alameddine lets the reader decide, or at least stokes the fires of debate as to what death means scientifically, emotionally, and otherwise. It seems that in Alameddine's eyes death is not something determined by doctors, but can come sooner and often does. Another mention of death in the novel comes in the form of the four horsemen of the apocalypse from the book of revelation. The four horsemen take part in several dialogues throughout the book which at times are humorous, another look at Alameddine's sometimes comedic take on the subject.

=== AIDS vs. war ===
The two major settings in Alameddine's novel are Lebanon and San Francisco, both of which were facing distinct cultural crises at the time being described in the novel. Lebanon was ravished with civil war while San Francisco was ravished with the AIDS epidemic. Throughout the novel certain parallels are made but the author also makes a point to let the reader know that the problems happen in both places. More specifically, he makes it known that AIDS and issues with homosexuality affect people in Lebanon and the war affects people outside of the war zone. One very important comparison that Alameddine makes throughout the book is the idea of control in regards to AIDS and Lebanon. With the AIDS patients the reader is taken through the sickness and the complete loss of control that the patients face with their bodies basically shutting down from within. This is eerily similar to the loss of control that the citizens of Lebanon face as their country is divided from within while outside forces like Syria and Israel take advantage of their situation much like the virus and consequent illnesses that actually end up killing the patients.

=== Sex ===
The relation of sex to danger and violence, whether it be through the war in Lebanon or through AIDS is ever present throughout the book. The first sexual experience that we read about is Samir's loss of virginity, which is not only graphic but uses language illustrating painful sex. In the garage of the apartment building, described as "dark, damp, and putrid" (15) and Samir "felt a wet finger penetrate him. It felt uncomfortable." (15) Georges tells Samir that "he is a natural" and Samir repeats, "I like it. I try to help him, but it gets too painful" (15). As Georges climaxes "the sound of gunfire erupts again" (15). The scene conjures the image of a boy living everyday life in a conflicted environment. In physical pain from the penetration but excited at what is happening with Georges, he doesn't quite know what to so but is learning as he goes. The gunfire being simultaneous with Georeges's orgasm is significant of the war being ever present. Samir then runs upstairs to watch the war from the roof and is almost struck by a bullet flying at his crotch. It could have been about to hit him anywhere, but the author chooses to have it almost strike him there. Inevitably this reference is linked to the sex moments earlier, calling to question if the author's statement is about gay sex being unsafe at this time, like dodging a bullet. If the author is discussing sex between gay men as dangerous it is because of the danger of having sex in relation to the AIDS epidemic. The epidemic was random in terms of who lived and who died, kind of like war. Survival in relation to the disease and the war was a matter of luck, not based on precautions or actions.

When Mohammad meets Scott he had a thing for him and desires him greatly. He takes him to his art studio and shows him his paintings. Watching as Scott was admiring his work Mohammad says that "the scene was turning him on" (13) but Scott starts talking and describing the painting, relating to Mohammad's life, so he no longer wanted to have sex; in fact they "never fucked, ever" (13). However, Mohammad loves Scott more than anyone in the world and Scott's last words were of his love for Mohammad. In this instance of intense love we see desire but then no sex. Alalmeddine is perhaps implying that relationships, of the most significant kind, are about more than sex, and that sex is in fact not necessary in a deep loving relationship.

The one straight sexual relationship the we read of is in the context of an affair in Lebanon between a powerful political figure's wife and a warlord. She falls in love with him and he seems to love her, but still the war and violence is the theme of their relationship and sex. At one point they are lying in bed and she feels a gun under the pillow, and he tells her that he has many more guns. He takes five and lays them on her stomach and says she has to take one. With the loaded gun he "massages her" (181) and "the barrel penetrates...he explores with the gun...he looks into her eyes. She is his" (181). When she points the gun at his head he smiles and performs fellatio on the gun. Then "she looks into his eyes. He is hers...she orgasms" (181). This scene is again, like the loss of virginity scene, dangerous and has conflicting images but still expresses love. The fact that they are using a loaded gun as a sex toy can speak to the questionable aspect of the affair, the pretenses of their love; or just that he is a warlord depending on one's reading of the scene. Regardless, even in heterosexual sex we see the link between violence and sex.

If ever there was a doubt to the narrator's intentions we are given a quote by Norman Mailer saying, "There is nothing safe about sex. There never will be" (178). Linking sex to the dangers of AIDS, not just war, there is a scene in which the narrator walks to the Badlands to find someone to have sex with and "walked out with a boy...took him home and fucked him silly" (176). Just the notion of going to find a random person to have sex with is risky, but in the novel it coincides with the culture. The use of the word "fuck"as opposed to "make love" or "have sex" makes the act purely physical and takes the emotion out of it. The next morning the boy wakes up and realizes he has slept with an HIV-positive man and gets really upset, saying that he did not know. In an act of defiance, the narrator goes to the tattoo parlor and has an "HIV+" tattooed on his chest, so that "now no one can claim [he] never told them" (177). Art News asked him to pose for a picture of the tattoo thinking that it was an artistic statement. This example of confusion and repercussion gives the reader incite into the domination of the disease on daily life. Furthermore, we are shown an example of how the outside community cannot understand the struggles of a gay man with AIDS, even when he attempts to make it very clear.

=== Art ===
Art in the novel illustrates the struggle with AIDS, a community, and a means of identity. Perhaps the simplest connection to AIDS is in the fear of death and the creation of immortality. As an artist, one can be remembered, leaving something physical behind that will be protected or kept. Samir visits Mohammad and Scott and is inspired by Mo (a nickname given to him by other characters that he dislikes) and paints a portrait of their friend Juan, who just died (140). He then paints Steve, who also just died (140). By painting people who have just died, the painter preserves the subject. Regardless of the quality, the paintings are a tribute to their memory. Scott acknowledges this ability in art and asks Mo to use his ashes in a painting specifically so that he may be immortal (103). He is not only going to carry on through an image but knows that people will look at a painting of him and it will most likely be appreciated and never destroyed. In asking for his ashes on canvas, he will be able to actually physically remain a part of people's lives. Granted, this is a hard task for Mo, who ultimately paints his best friend into a peaceful lotus blossom. Scott epitomizes the theory behind using art as a refuge and as preserving oneself. Art is a part of Kurt's death wish as well when he asks Mo to take his paintings. He says "I know they're not worth much. You can take them while I go on my trip" (140). Kurt, lying on his death bed, leaves his work to Mo, who is his lover, but also in the same situation. As a part of the gay art community, Mo knows that Kurt means he cannot take his paintings after he dies, but that he wants them to remain somewhere. Through looking at the fact that the characters of the art community think about where there art will end up after their death gives the feeling that perhaps while alive they were thinking of the same thing, that to an extent the art could preserve them.

Regarding the art community, there is a whole community of characters with shared experiences who all either paint or attend shows and exhibitions and admire each other's artwork. The community provides a place to express emotion, meet peers, and reconcile life to an extent. Samir goes to one of Mohammad's exhibits in DC with his lover Mark and is the only one to understand the subjects of the paintings. He tells the art dealer that he has never seen Mohammad's abstract paintings, but the dealer is confused because the thinks that these paintings are abstract. Samir replies "but they are the sides of our houses...he painted them beautifully" (101). He says that "he had captured Lebanon" (101). Mohammad jokingly is upset with Samir for ruining his secret but is also excited to have found someone to relate to. The scene shows first, that the community developed through art and second, another way in which art is used. These pictures are not preserving a dead friend's memory, but they are preserving Mohammad and Samir's war-torn homeland without violence involved. Through the exhibit scene, one is shown again the ignorance of an outside culture looking in by the viewers' willingness to assume that the pictures were abstract as opposed to merely asking for a description, which Mohammad says no one did.

Art is also used to show acceptance and exclusion in society. On pages 48 to 49, Mohammad is describing showing a picture to his father who asks him "how come you always draw men...come back and show me when you have drawn some women (49)." Mohammad follows his father's advice and eagerly draws a copy of Goya's "Nude Maja". He does not know how to draw the face and decides to improvise, and then returns to show his father. His father slaps him because the face looks like Mohammad's mother. Mohammad is called a pervert by his father at age seven for his attempt to replicate a painting and using his own concepts of reality to create his artwork. Later his painting sold for $300,000 and was titled My Mother as the Nude Maja. Almadene gives a character who uses classic art and makes it his own but is rejected for it. One sees Mohammad's inability to really own a shared culture without being critiqued, as well as sexuality again affecting Mohammad negatively.

== Style and structure ==
Koolaids is a very complicated novel both stylistically and in terms of its structure. The book is divided into a series of vignettes that are presented in a seemingly disjointed manner that serves to reflect the great chaos brought by the Lebanese Civil War and the AIDS epidemic. The main vignettes deal with the main characters such as Mohammed and Samir, but there are many others that introduce, and reintroduce characters creating a disjointed reading experience not found in many novels. Many of these small episodes do not even deal with tangible characters but rather figments of one of the other characters' imagination. Other times the vignettes contain detailed accounts of personas, such as the lovers from opposite sides of the conflict in Beirut, who persistently remain unidentified. The reader really does not get a true idea of how all the scenes relate to each other until the end of the book and no more new information is being presented.

=== Stream of consciousness ===
The novel, though stylistically unique, has very much in common with the modernist literary style Stream of Consciousness, pioneered by authors such as James Joyce, William Faulkner, and Virginia Woolf. Stream of consciousness is effectively an unending interior monologue that tries to portray the constant thought process of the lead character. Sensory stimuli that the character encounters or random thoughts that might pop into his head are all incorporated into the narration to create a story that gives the reader a better impression of the character's state of mind than other styles. Books that fall into this category are often very liberal in terms of syntax and grammar to reflect the characters rambling thought patterns. Koolaids fits many of these criteria but takes the notion of a stream of consciousness to a new level. Well known stream of consciousness works usually follow very few characters, such as Virginia Woolf's Mrs. Dalloway, which follows two character, Clarissa Dalloway and Septimus Warren Smith, through an average day in their lives. Other novels, such as Faulkner's The Sound and the Fury, follow a team of characters that are closely linked, in this case all associated with a single southern plantation. Koolaids follows more than just a team of characters. As stated above, there are the identifiable main characters, Mohammed and Samir. These characters do know each other and interact, but there are many others that are followed that only have in common the fact that their lives were impacted by either AIDS or the Lebanese Civil War. Whereas a novel like Mrs. Dalloway follows more than one character in order to contrast the minds of sane person with a person on the brink of mental illness, Koolaids does not have such an understandable reason for having multiple and often unidentified narrators. This conforms to the book's theme of chaos, the loss of identity experienced in modern Lebanese society and the San Francisco gay community following the civil war and the AIDS epidemic.

Another way Koolaids differs from established stream of conscious literature is through its lack of structurally sequenced time. Established stream of consciousness works, such as The Sound and the Fury, may be literarily complicated, but they generally have some identifiable chronology. Koolaids goes back and forth over the course of more than twenty years, from the childhoods of various characters, through to the death of Mohammed occurring in the present. This can be confusing at times, but like the other vignettes, it can be understood at the end and a unified story becomes apparent. A place where Koolaids does seem to conform to the style of stream of consciousness is in its lack of a conclusion. The novel ends with Mohammed dying unceremoniously, much as The Sound and the Fury ends abruptly with the Compsons driving around town in a decaying carriage.

=== Postmodern literature ===
The link between the style of Koolaids and stream of consciousness literature makes more sense when the novel's status as a postmodernist work is taken into account. Postmodern literature, as suggested by its name, was a reaction to the norms of modernist literature, but drew much influence from the stream of conscious style. These books tend to explore multiple levels of an inner state of consciousness, reject a distinction between high and low culture, and an acknowledgement that more and more of society is becoming commoditized and fetishized. They also reject the modernist notion that all existence has an underlying meaning or cause (see existentialism), such as the notion that the decay of the Compsons in The Sound and the Fury was related to the fall of the American South. Many works also employ a sense of intertextuality and self-referentiality not found in the literature of previous generations.

Koolaids falls into many of the postmodern criteria. The following of multiple, seemingly unrelated characters’ streams of consciousness relates to trying to display multiple levels of inner consciousness. The novel contains various extremely graphic sexual scenes that sit alongside beautifully narrated accounts of the characters lives. By implying that sexual and violent scenes can be incorporated into a respectable novel, Alameddine is effectively erasing any notion that high and low art should be kept separate and stating that all is connected. Another way that Koolaids conforms to the postmodern ideal is in its lack of a deeper current unifying all the tragedy it contains. The only thing unifying the events in the book is the notion of chaos, the very opposite of meaning and order. A final way that Alameddine's novel conforms to postmodern literature is through the self-referentiality of some of the narrators. An example of this is on page 114, where the narrator says, "Hey you!" in a direct call to the reader. Another, more subtle, self-reference begins on page 221 and continues through page 231. In this, the narrator describes a play he wanted to write that described the workings of Lebanese society in a very concise way. The "play" that follows seems to make references to actual characters spoken about in other parts of the novel, a nod to the great intertextuality found within postmodernist works. The book may effectively be considered a postmodern stream of conscious novel. Stylistically it draws heavily from that modernist technique, but at the same time it rejects the ideals of modernism in favor of the postmodernist standard. Koolaids remains very hard to classify due to its intricate plots and vignettes masterfully crafted by Alameddine. Its existentialist message can at times be very hard to decipher.

== Cultural and political references ==
=== HIV/AIDS in Koolaids ===
One of the major cultural references in the novel Koolaids is the disease HIV/AIDS. Almost every character in the story is related to the disease in some way. Alameddine's characters constantly refer to HIV/AIDS related terms and the disease itself throughout the novel. Sometimes it is slight and other times it is quite obvious. The characters seem to have a non-chalant way of approaching the disease. At times it even seems like they do not care to inform the reader of the terms they use.

The first reference to HIV/AIDS is a “KS lesion” which is found on page 8. A “KS legion” is a Kaposi's sarcoma lesion, which form on various places of a person in a later stage of HIV/AIDS. The lesions are most visible and recognizable on skin, and therefore give away the HIV/AIDS status of the person who has them. Those who read the book and have no former experience with HIV/AIDS may not understand the terms. In this way of writing, Alammedine has a select audience that he writes to. Other HIV/AIDS vocabulary used throughout the novel are CMV retinitis (Cytomegalovirus retinitis), in which the infected person loses his or her eyesight. One of the narrators refers to this condition when talking of his friend who was an artist who stopped painting due to CMV retinitis. In this reference he sort of describes the condition by saying that his friend, “couldn't see worth shit due to CMV retinitis” (10). One of the most impactful references to HIV/AIDS in the novel is short, nine sentences long. It says:

“So Billy Shakespeare was queer. Ronnie was the greatest president in history, right up there on Mount Rushmore. AIDS is mankind's greatest plague. Israel only kills terrorists. American never bombed Lebanon. Jesus was straight. Judas and he were just friends. Roseanne's parents molested her as an infant. Menachem Begin and Yasser Arafat deserved their Nobles. And Gaetan Dugas stated the AIDS epidemic”(12).

This short paragraph gives a good take on the controversies of society's view of history, especially of HIV/AIDS . The lines are meant to encourage the reader to challenge these assumptions or accept them. For example, Shakespeare's sexuality is a debate that has been raging for years. Ronnie is Ronald Reagan and the statement of him being the best president is very contentious. In Koolaids, Reagan is regularly referenced, and not in a positive light. The Gaetan Dugas sentence reflects on how many people and some falsely still think that Dugas started the entire epidemic. With these obviously inflammatory remarks, Alameddine grabs the reader's attention and starts the novel off with an interesting section, which sets the mood for much of the book.

HIV/AIDS seems to just pop up throughout the novel and its notation is just as sporadic as other subjects in Koolaids. Treatments and symptoms are mentioned without serious thought and have a dark tone. The narrators talk about HIV/AIDS as if it is this modern day Apocalypse, that everyone will soon have. When oxygen saturation is referenced the narrator says, “Ox sat. I bet you don't know what ox sat is. Oxygen saturation” (47). Yet, again it is mentioned in a way that excludes some readers. Perhaps the narrators do not want to include the readers, and all of the terms are meant for us to not even look up, but just accept.

One of the themes in the novel seems to be self-awareness of HIV/AIDS. For example, after an incident involving Christopher, who is HIV positive, sharing his food with his sister sparks outrage. His brother-in-law, Dennis, becomes very upset and accuses Christopher of possibly infecting his sister with HIV/AIDS. In response to Dennis' anger Christopher's partner, Joe, makes his position to Dennis, and possibly to the reader, very clear, “Neither Christopher, nor I are here to be your HIV or AIDS education service” (109). Perhaps Alameddine wants the readers to realize that the responsibility of being informed about HIV/AIDS is your own. Although Alameddine does not provide anything on the prevention of HIV/AIDS, the inclusion of HIV/AIDS vocabulary allows the reader to be exposed to the reality of the disease. Alameddine's approach is to intrigue readers to learn more about HIV/AIDS by not explaining everything to them. By planting curiosity within the readers minds, they will seek the knowledge.

Another concept about HIV/AIDS throughout the novel is the ignorance of HIV/AIDS by American society. When the epidemic started out as Gay-related immune deficiency (GRID) in the late 70s, early 80s, the disease only infected homosexual men. As we read further into the book, criticisms and notes on HIV/AIDS in popular culture become more prevalent. There is a certain section of the book, almost right in the middle where there is a mock Walton scene. At first the narrator says “I love you to all” of these characters, who presumably already died. Then he goes on to talk about a movie called Longtime Companion, that he believes was a joke, and “could have been called The Waltons Do AIDS” (114). The movie is said to have been unrealistic and it appears that all the characters sort of died off one by one. Another movie referenced in this montage is Philadelphia (film), which has a bad reception as well. At the end of this scene the narrator says, “Ask the reader. They have an objective view of this whole thing. Okay. Hey you! Hey you! Do you think this is enough?” (114). The anger within the voice of the character radiates off the page. Perhaps it is to ask the reader if the pop culture reaction to HIV/AIDS has been significant, or if it has been ignored. Due to the constant cultural references in the book when HIV/AIDS is presented it is obvious that HIV/AIDS was and has been ignored by the “majority” for a while.

This concept is visited again and the message is more obvious when the narrator states, “When did the last AIDS story make a newspaper's front page? My friends die. They keep dying, but people forget. Life goes on” (152). The statement most likely is a reflection of the portrayal of the disease. It is often ignored in the media and because of this ignorance, more people believe lies about HIV/AIDS and are not familiar with any terms or medication that those with HIV/AIDS use.

Alameddine appears to have written Koolaids as a reference for readers to learn more about many taboo topics, especially HIV/AIDS. This novel provides a resource for a unique perspective on HIV/AIDS, and creates intrigues for the reader to learn more about the topics in the novel.

=== The Lebanese Civil War ===
One of the main components of Alameddine's novel and one of the few linear components are the diary entries of Samir's mother, written during the Lebanese Civil War. She gives detailed accounts of her life as a result of the war and how it affects those around her. The first diary entry we are given, dated March 20, 1976, gives an account barely a year after the war began (April 1975). We receive a first hand account of how innocent people are injured and killed as a result of the war, but we are never really given any background information on the war.

The Lebanese Civil War extended over a 15-year period of time from April 1975-October 1990. The causes of the war are based on the planned arrangement of political power amongst various ethnic and religious groups, stemming from when the country gained its independence from France in 1943. At the time, Maronite Christians were sited as the largest single group. However, the country also included Sunni Muslims, Shia Muslims, and Greek Orthodox Christians. In 1943, once independence was achieved, the National Pact was formed between the Maronites and Shia Muslims, ensuring that those groups will always be in the most powerful political positions. The problem was that this type of government, known as a confessional democracy, left political power in the hands of the same elite families that had power under the French rule. By the early 60s, the majority of people in Lebanon were Muslim, yet the country was still ruled by the Maronite Christians.

During the late 1950s, pan-Arabism became widespread but Lebanon's Maronite president, Camille Chamoun, held pro-Western views, which led to his isolation in the Middle East. In May 1958, a civil war erupted. This, in combination with other events occurring simultaneously in the Middle East, led the United States to send troops to the Middle East. This three-week war killed up to 4,000 Lebanese.

But the most important part of this conflict in terms of Koolaids stems from the attack of the militia of the Christian Phalange faction on Palestinians in East Beirut on April 13, 1975. Innocent deaths were ubiquitous - as Samir's mother states in her first diary entry, Najwa's husband and three sons die just sitting in their apartment. During these first few years, the Lebanese National Movement (LNM) fought for the abolition of the National Pact and their partner, the PLO (Palestine Liberation Organization) was expelled from Lebanon. However, this war quickly grew to involve more surrounding countries, as leaders in other countries realized the effects this civil war would have on the rest of the Middle East. Both Syria and Israel supported one of the Christian factions, but Syria quickly changed its allegiance to the National Liberal Party - a Muslim, pro-Palestinian group. The PLO attacked Israel and in June 1982, Israel bombed Lebanon.

War continued until the Fall of 1989 when remaining members of the Lebanese parliament met in Saudi Arabia to draft the National Reconciliation Charter, commonly known as the Taif Agreement. Power was now equally split amongst Christians and Muslims. However another rebellion was launched in 1990 but was suppressed by Syria, thus ending the 15-year civil war.

Overall, nearly 200,000 Lebanese died during these years. And although the Lebanese government was now reformed, it is still based on religious and ethnic quotas.

=== Gaëton Dugas ===
Gaëtan Dugas, during the time in which Koolaids takes place, was considered to be patient zero of AIDS. He was a flight attendant who was falsely thought to have carried the disease from Africa to the Western World. Even though he claimed to have more than 2,500 sexual partners, there is little support that he was the sole person involved in the spread of AIDS epidemic. He is mentioned near the beginning of this novel where lists of famous and historical figures who were arguably homosexual are written.

=== Ronald Reagan ===
Ronald Reagan, although not immediately, promoted U.S. involvement in the Lebanese Civil War. Although he planned to keep troops in Lebanon after the Beirut barracks bombing, that plan was later aborted. He kept troops in Lebanon for less than a year. In addition to criticism for his lack of involvement in the crises in Lebanon in "Koolaids," his administration is also criticized for its extraordinarily slow response to the HIV-AIDS epidemic that occurred during his presidency. In April 1984, the Center for Disease Control announced nearly 2,000 deaths in America, yet Reagan still said nothing. By the time he finally addressed the issue in 1987, 20,849 Americans had died from AIDS. Many people still question how much the death toll and research regarding treatments would have changed had he acknowledged the disease when it first arose in America.

== Title ==
The title Koolaids: The Art of War is a combination of the fruit drink Kool-Aid and Sun Tzu's book The Art of War.

Alameddine directly mentions Kool-Aid within the text of the novel twice. It makes its first appearance as one of the narrative blurbs on page 99. He writes:

Death, when it approaches, ought not to take one by surprise. It should be part of the full expectancy of life. Without an ever-present sense of death, life is insipid. You might as well live on the whites of eggs. You might as well drink Kool-Aid.

This phrase, "drinking the Kool-Aid" has a particular significance, meaning to accept an argument or philosophy completely or blindly. The term originated from the Jonestown Massacre, in which 913 People's Temple cultists committed mass suicide by drinking potassium cyanide laced Flavor Aid, a product similar to Kool-Aid.

The second use of Kool-Aid is on page 191, following a vignette about Marwa. In this story, while living in France as teenagers, Mohammad's sister asks a teen magazine for a pen pal from the U.S. She receives a letter from Sarah Miller, a girl who tells her all about her life in Des Moines, Iowa, which Marwa finds funny. Later, a highly exaggerated and fictional essay about growing up in war-torn Beirut written by Marwa and Nawal gets published in several newspapers, and the girls send it to Sarah as a reply. Sarah's next letter expresses her shock and includes a slice of fruitcake to "ease the pain." Marwa and Nawal never reply, but Sarah continues to send them letters, containing more empathy, more daily happenings, and more gifts to "ease the pain," which include a No. 2 pencil, a Mickey Mouse eraser, and a cookie. These letters continue to come, at least once every six months, always with a gift till the present day of the novel, when Mohammad overhears Nawal talking to Marwa about Sarah on the phone. Having never heard of Sarah before, he picks up the letter to find out about Sarah's newest deliberations and doings, along with her gift to ease their pain, which turns out to be a single packet of blue lemonade Kool-Aid.

Given that many of the characters in the novel are HIV+ and are dying from AIDS, the name "Koolaids", linking "cool" and "AIDS" together, may also be an attempt at black humor.

Sun Tzu and The Art of War are also mentioned in Koolaids, at the end of one of the narrator's editorials on military conflicts in the Middle East. The narrator describes Israel and Hizballah firing at each other, and how each of them seem to be unable to hit anything but civilian targets. He concludes on page 97, saying:

So there you have it, a brief history of the Middle East version of "The Art of War". Who needs poor old Sun?

== Cover art ==
There are three versions of Koolaids covers available. Two feature self-portraits of Rabih Alameddine, which come from a series of 270 different paintings "based on the same image". This image is a closeup of a man's face, focusing on the eyes, eyebrows, nose, and mouth. The Koolaids cover only uses one version of the self-portrait, but varies in the font of the title and the shade of the painting. For this particular self-portrait, the man's features are slightly fuzzily drawn, with very thick black lines. The rest of the painting, the skin of the face, is a mottled and faded yellow-green. There are a series of miniature sketches of the main face scaled down underneath the right eye, and several sketches of men running diagonally from above the nose to the left cheek. These sketches are mostly simple headshots with minimal detail. One however, contains more than just a head and shoulders. He is drawn down to the waist, and has more hair than the others.

The other cover is a quote from Amy Tan reviewing the book:

"Rabih Alameddine's "Koolaids is the companion guide to The Tibetan Book of the Dead, The Diary of Anne Frank, and the history of the world. It is hysterical in both senses, hilarious and loudly disturbing. (Where else does Krishnamurti meet Eleanor Roosevelt and Tom Cruise?) Like Zen koans, Koolaids issues pronouncements while pointing out the absurdities of any kind of truth. It contemplates the meaning of death while redefining the meaninglessness of life. It looks at the great cycle of history, destiny, and literature and puts them on spin and recycle. This is an absolutely brilliant book - daring in its somersault of literary feats and allusions, an antidote for anyone who suffers from the blahs or an excess of self-satisfaction. I hope it's widely read." -Amy Tan

This quote is printed in black text, with Rabih Alameddine's name and the second usage of Koolaids printed in red. There is nothing else on the cover, just a white background.

== Reception ==
Koolaids: The Art of War generally received positive critical reviews; Kirkus Reviews called it:

A wildly uneven, but powerful and original portrayal of cultural and sexual displacement, alienation, and--in its admirably gritty way--pride.

The Portland Oregonian, Publishers Weekly, and writer Amy Tan all wrote favorably of it as well. The New York Times, however, found it mediocre, saying:

[M]ost readers will wind up wishing Alameddine himself had more literary flair. Despite some interesting ideas and memorable imagery, his book demonstrates little feel for narrative. In fact, there is hardly any dramatic urgency in this collage of observations, thoughts and vignettes... ...An accomplished novelist can keep his readers' interest in a topsy-turvy story. But Alameddine has a long way to go before he can pull off that trick.
