= Rabih Alameddine =

American painter and writer

- Rabih Alameddine at Politics and Prose in 2026
- Born: 1959 (age 66–67); Amman, Jordan
- Education: University of California at Los Angeles
- Occupation: Novelist

Rabih Alameddine (Arabic: ربيع علم الدين; born 1959) is a Lebanese painter and writer. His 2021 novel The Wrong End of the Telescope won the 2022 PEN/Faulkner Award for Fiction. He also won the 2025 National Book Award for Fiction for his novel The True True Story of Raja the Gullible (and His Mother).

== Early life ==
Alameddine was born in Amman, Jordan to Lebanese Druze parents. (Alameddine identifies as an atheist).

He grew up in Kuwait and Lebanon, which he left at age 17 to live first in England and then in California to pursue higher education. He earned a degree in engineering from the University of California at Los Angeles (UCLA) and a Master of Business in San Francisco. Alameddine is gay.

== Career ==
Alameddine began his career as an engineer, then moved to writing and painting. His debut novel Koolaids, which touched on both the AIDS epidemic in San Francisco and the Lebanese Civil War, was published in 1998 by Picador.

The author of six novels and a collection of short stories, Alameddine was the recipient of a Guggenheim Fellowship in 2002. His queer sensibility has added a different slant to narratives about immigrants within the context of what became known as Orientalism.

He has lived in San Francisco and Beirut.

== Awards and honors ==
In 2014, Alameddine was a finalist for the National Book Critics Circle Award and he won the California Book Awards Gold Medal Fiction for An Unnecessary Woman.

Alameddine is best known for this novel, which tells the story of Aaliya, a Lebanese woman and translator living in war-torn Lebanon. The novel "manifests traumatic signposts of the [Lebanese] civil war, which make it indelibly situational, and accordingly latches onto complex psychological issues."

In 2017, Alameddine won the Arab American Book Award and the Lambda Literary Award for Gay Fiction for The Angel of History.

In 2018 he was teaching in the University of Virginia's creative writing program, in Charlottesville.

He was shortlisted for the 2021 Sunday Times Short Story Award for his story, "The July War".

Alameddine's novel The Wrong End of the Telescope won the 2022 PEN/Faulkner Award for Fiction. His novel The True True Story of Raja the Gullible (and His Mother) won the 2025 National Book Award for Fiction.

== Works ==
- Koolaids: The Art of War (1998)
- The Perv: Stories (1999)
- I, the Divine: A Novel in First Chapters (2001)
- The Hakawati (2008)
- An Unnecessary Woman (2014)
- The Angel of History: A Novel (2016)
- The Wrong End of the Telescope (2021)
- Comforting Myths: Concerning the Political in Art (2024)
- The True True Story of Raja the Gullible (and His Mother) (2025)
