= Wild Dark Shore =

2025 novel by Charlotte McConaghy

- Author: Charlotte McConaghy
- Publisher: Flatiron Books
- Publication date: 2025
- Pages: 320
- ISBN: 978-1-250-82795-1

Wild Dark Shore is a 2025 novel by Australian writer Charlotte McConaghy, published by Flatiron Books. In the novel, a woman named Rowan is shipwrecked and washes ashore on Shearwater Island, a remote isle near Antarctica that houses a research station with a seed vault.

The novel was inspired by Macquarie Island, which McConaghy visited.

== Reception ==
Wild Dark Shore was a New York Times and IndieBound bestseller. The novel received starred reviews from Booklist and Kirkus Reviews. Library Journal named it one of the best novels of 2025.

Leah Rachel von Essen of the Chicago Review of Books called it "an exceptional book that hands readers a bittersweet helping of sorrow and joy, sounding a clarifying call towards a symbiotic survival that prioritizes our need to do more than simply subsist: to put trust in each other and in the nature that surrounds us."

Matt Bell of the New York Times wrote that the novel "abounds with evocative nature writing, including precocious Orly's moving monologues about the dandelion, the buzzy burr, the dinosaur tree and other model specimens of natural resilience."

Publishers Weekly writes that "McConaghy ratchets up the tension as the characters’ paranoia and mutual suspicion increases and their motives are revealed, though she scuttles the momentum with predictable romantic subplots, and a late-stage plot twist strains credulity. For the most part, though, McConaghy blends entertainment with a sobering message about conservation and the impacts of geographic isolation."

Wild Dark Shore was also reviewed by Book Reporter, Shelf Awareness, and The Washington Post.

The audiobook, narrated by Cooper Mortlock and a full cast, received a starred review from Booklist, whose Heather Booth highlighted how "the full cast narration adds another layer of intrigue and connection to the characters while making it clear how isolated each is from one another".
