= Bryan Washington =

American writer

- Born: April 22, 1993 (age 33); Kentucky, U.S.
- Education: University of Houston (BA); University of New Orleans (MFA)
- Occupations: Writer; scholar
- Writing career
- Genre: Fiction
- Notable works: Lot; Memorial; Palaver
- Notable awards: 5 Under 35 Honoree (2019); Ernest J. Gaines Award for Literary Excellence (2019); Dylan Thomas Prize (2020); Young Lions Fiction Award (2020); MacArthur Fellowship (2026)

Bryan Washington (born April 22, 1993) is an American author from Houston, Texas. His debut short story collection, Lot, won the 2020 Young Lions Fiction Award. His third novel, Palaver, won the 2025 Los Angeles Times Book Prize for Fiction. He is a frequent contributor to The New Yorker. His writing has also appeared in Granta, The New York Times Magazine, Time, GQ, Esquire, and more.

In 2019, he was name a "5 Under 35" Honoree by the National Book Foundation. He received a MacArthur Fellowship in 2026.

== Early life and education ==
Washington was born 1993 in Kentucky. His family moved to Katy, Texas, 30 miles west of Houston, when he was 3 years old. Washington knew that he was gay at a young age but did not formally come out, fearing stigmatization. He graduated from James E. Taylor High School in Katy in 2011.

Washington graduated from the University of Houston with a BA in English. He continued his education at the University of New Orleans, where he earned a Master of Fine Arts in Creative Writing.

== Career ==
Washington's first book, Lot, is a series of 13 interconnected short stories set in Houston published in 2019 by Riverhead. The book centers in part on Nicolás, a young man of mixed African American and Latino American descent who works in his family's restaurant while coming to terms with his sexuality. The book won the 2019 Ernest J. Gaines Award for Literary Excellence, the 2020 Dylan Thomas Prize, and the 2020 Lambda Literary Award for Gay Fiction.

Washington's debut novel, Memorial, was published in 2020. It was longlisted for the Aspen Words Literary Prize, the Andrew Carnegie Medal for Excellence in Fiction, and the Center for Fiction First Novel Prize. Memorial was selected as a New York Times Notable Book. Prior to publication, A24 purchased the rights to adapt the novel for television, with Washington to write the screenplay adaptation.

His second novel, Family Meal, won the 2024 Lambda Literary Award for Gay Fiction.

Washington's fourth book, Palaver, was a finalist for the 2025 National Book Award for Fiction and won the 2025 Los Angeles Times Book Prize for Fiction.

Washington previously lectured in English at Rice University. In July 2020, he was made George Guion Williams Writer in Residence and Scholar in Residence for Racial Justice. He is currently based in Tokyo, Japan.

== Awards ==
Year	Title	Award	Category	Result	R
2019	Lot	Ernest J. Gaines Award for Literary Excellence	—	Won	
2020	Lot	Texas Institute of Letters Award	Sergio Troncoso Award	Won	
2020	Lot	Aspen Words Literary Prize	—	Shortlisted	
2020	Lot	Crook's Corner Book Prize	—	Shortlisted	
2020	Lot	Dylan Thomas Prize	—	Won	
2020	Lot	Edmund White Award	—	Shortlisted	
2020	Lot	Lambda Literary Awards	Gay Fiction	Won	
2020	Lot	Young Lions Fiction Award	—	Won	
2020	Memorial: A Novel	Center for Fiction First Novel Prize	—	Longlisted	
2020	Memorial: A Novel	National Book Critics Circle Award	Fiction	Shortlisted	
2021	Memorial: A Novel	Andrew Carnegie Medals for Excellence	Fiction	Longlisted	
2021	Memorial: A Novel	Aspen Words Literary Prize	—	Longlisted	
2021	Memorial: A Novel	Heartland Booksellers Award	Fiction	Won	
2021	Memorial: A Novel	Ferro-Grumley Award	LGBTQ Fiction	Finalist	
2021	Memorial: A Novel	VCU Cabell First Novelist Award	—	Finalist	
2022	Memorial: A Novel	James Tait Black Memorial Prize	—	Shortlisted	
2022	Memorial: A Novel	William Saroyan International Prize for Writing	Fiction	Shortlisted	
2024	Family Meal: A Novel	Lambda Literary Award	Gay Fiction	Won	
2025	Palaver	National Book Award	Fiction	Finalist	
2025	Palaver	Los Angeles Times Book Prize	Fiction	Won	

== Bibliography ==
=== Short story collection ===
- —— (2019). Lot: Stories (1st ed.). Riverhead Books. ISBN 978-0-525-53367-2.

=== Novels ===
- —— (2020). Memorial: A Novel. Riverhead Books. ISBN 978-0-593-08727-5.
- —— (2023). Family Meal: A Novel (1st ed.). Riverhead Books. ISBN 978-0-593-42109-3.
- —— (2025). Palaver (1st ed.). Farrar, Straus and Giroux. ISBN 978-0-374-60907-8.

=== Fiction and essays ===
- —— (August 8, 2019). "How Many". Flash Fiction. The New Yorker.
- —— (August 3, 2020). "Heirlooms". Fiction. The New Yorker.
- —— (June 14, 2021). "Foster". Fiction. The New Yorker.
- —— (July 18, 2022). "Arrivals". Fiction. The New Yorker.
- —— (September 16, 2024). "Last Coffeehouse on Travis". Fiction. The New Yorker.
- —— (March 23, 2025). "Hatagaya Lore". Fiction. The New Yorker.
- —— (September 15, 2025). "Voyagers". Fiction. The New Yorker.
