= The Hakawati =

Novel by Rabih Alameddine

The Hakawati ("storyteller" in Arabic) is a novel written by Rabih Alameddine and published by Alfred A. Knopf in 2008. The novel explores Lebanese families and cultures, and was well received by critics.

== Plot summary ==
Set in 2003, a young man travels from Los Angeles, California to his father's death-bed in Beirut, Lebanon. He and relatives share contemporary stories and parables during the vigil.

== Characters ==
- Afreet Jehanam
- Baybars
- Elie
- Farid al-Kharrat
- Fatima
- Ismail
- Lina
- Mariella
- Osama al-Kharrat
- Othman
- Uncle Jihad
