= William Luis =

American professor of Spanish

William Luis is the Gertrude Conaway Vanderbilt Professor of Spanish at Vanderbilt University, where he has held a faculty appointment since 1991.

== Early life and education ==
He was born and raised in New York City to parents of Afro-Cuban and Chinese heritage. He received a bachelor of arts degree from Binghamton University in 1971, followed by a master of arts degree in Ibero-American Studies from the University of Wisconsin-Madison and a master of arts degree from Cornell University. He graduated from Cornell with Ph.D. in 1980.

== Career ==
At Vanderbilt University, Luis served as the director of Latino and Latina Studies and is the editor of the Afro-Hispanic Review. He has also taught at Dartmouth College, Washington University in St. Louis, Binghamton University, and Yale University. He was a Guggenheim Fellow (2012–2013).

== Published works ==
Luis has published 14 books, 5 introductions to books, and more than 120 scholarly articles, among other publications. Here is a short list of his most referenced work.

- Literary bondage: slavery in Cuban narrative. University of Texas Press, 1990.
- "The Politics of Memory and Miguel Barnet's The Autobiography of a Run Away Slave." MLN 104.2 (1989): 475-491.
- Culture and customs of Cuba. Bloomsbury Publishing USA, 2000.
- "A Search for Identity in Julia Alvarez's How the García Girls Lost Their Accents." Callaloo 23.3 (2000): 839-849.
- Dance between two cultures: Latino Caribbean literature written in the United States. Vanderbilt University Press, 2001.
- Lunes de Revolución: Literatura y cultura en los primeros años de la Revolución Cubana. Editorial Verbum, 2003.
- Manzano, Juan Francisco. Autobiografía Del Esclavo Poeta Y Otros Escritos. (Edition by Luis). Iberoamericana; Vervuert, 2007.
