= The True True Story of Raja the Gullible (and His Mother) =

2025 novel by Rabih Alameddine

- First edition
- Author: Rabih Alameddine
- Publisher: Grove Press
- Publication date: September 2, 2025
- Media type: Print (hardback)
- Pages: 326
- ISBN: 978-0-8021-6647-0

The True True Story of Raja the Gullible (and His Mother) is a 2025 dark comedic novel by Rabih Alameddine which recounts six decades in the life of a Lebanese family. It won the 2025 National Book Award for fiction.

It has a non-linear format, told through a series of nested stories through the eyes of a gay 63-year-old philosophy teacher who confronts his past, his relationship with his mother, and his homeland. It covers the Lebanese Civil War, Lebanon's 2019 liquidity crisis, the COVID-19 pandemic, and the 2020 port explosion in Beirut, which killed more than 200 and injured thousands more.

== Contents ==
I (2023)

II (2001 - 2021)
The Banking Crisis
The Covid Pandemic

III (1960 - 1975)
Pre-Civil War

IV (1975)
The Civil War

V (1975-2021)
The Port Explosion

VI (2021)
Virginia

VII (2025)

== Origins ==
The book is inspired in part by Alameddine's own relationship with his aging mother, who was losing her memory.

== Sources ==
- Alameddine, Rahib. 2025. The True True Story of Raja the Gullible (and His Mother). Grove Press, New York. ISBN 978-0-8021-6647-0
