= Linda Rui Feng =

Canadian author and academic

Linda Rui Feng is a Chinese-Canadian writer and academic, whose debut novel Swimming Back to Trout River was longlisted for the 2021 Giller Prize.

Born in Shanghai, China, she lived in the United States for several years before moving to Toronto, Ontario, where she is a professor of Chinese cultural history at the University of Toronto. She previously published the academic work City of Marvel and Transformation: Changan and Narratives of Experience in Tang Dynasty China in 2015.
