= Friday Black =

2018 short story collection by Nana Kwame Adjei-Brenyah

- Author: Nana Kwame Adjei-Brenyah
- Language: English
- Publisher: Mariner Books
- Publication date: October 23, 2018
- Publication place: United States
- Pages: 208
- ISBN: 978-1-328-91124-7
- OCLC: 1056493398

Friday Black is the 2018 debut book by author Nana Kwame Adjei-Brenyah. The collection of short stories explores themes surrounding black identity as it relates to a range of contemporary social issues. The stories are set in a variety of twisted near-future and dystopian settings. The book received an overall positive reception, including the naming of Adjei-Brenyah as one of the "5 Under 35 Authors" for 2018 by the National Book Foundation.

== Content ==
Story	Originally published in
"The Finkelstein 5"	Printers Row, July 2016
"Things My Mother Said"	Foliate Oak Literary Magazine, September 2014, "in slightly different form"
"The Era"	Guernica, (April 2, 2018), reprinted in The Best American Short Stories 2019
"Lark Street"	Original
"The Hospital Where"	Original
"Zimmer Land"	Original
"Friday Black"	Original
"The Lion & the Spider"	Original
"Light Spitter"	Original
"How to Sell a Jacket as Told by IceKing"	Original
"In Retail"	Compose: A Journal of Simply Good Writing, Fall 2014
"Through the Flash"	Original

== Overview ==
The book's titular work takes its title from the consumer holiday Black Friday, which takes place in the US on the Friday following Thanksgiving. It follows its protagonist, a department store salesman, as he copes with "vicious, insatiable Black Friday shoppers" who become violent and animalistic in their desire to shop. The protagonist attempts to win a sales contest among employees in order to give an expensive jacket to his mother as a gift. "How to Sell a Jacket as Told by IceKing" and "In Retail" take place in the same department store.

The opening piece, "The Finkelstein 5", concerns Emmanuel, who has to "dial his blackness" up or down depending on his situation: down to 1.5 for an interview with a prospective employer, comfortably at 4.0 with the aid of a necktie and wing-tipped shoes, and up to 10 when his sense of vengeance bursts forth over the killing of five black children by a chainsaw-wielding white man.

The work continues to explore a range of topics, from issues of race in the United States criminal justice system, to the plight of a teenager working to support their family after their father's disappearance, school shootings, and "a dystopian Groundhog Day in which victims of an unexplained weapon relive a single day and resort to extreme violence to cope". In "Zimmer Land", referencing George Zimmerman, the black protagonist struggles to change the narrative in a theme park where mostly white patrons savagely relish their racial prejudices under the guise of "problem-solving, judgement and justice." "The Era" presents a schoolboy's dilemmas in a dystopian society where self-confidence comes only through the use of drugs.

== Themes ==
Adjei-Brenyah has said he sought to use a form of "magical realism" as a tool for exploring issues such as "race and the depravities of consumer culture and our collective habituation to violence" in his writing. Speaking to the Wall Street Journal Adjei-Brenyah reflected,

I like to work in that space where, "Is it hyperbole? I don't know." When you kill someone with a gun or a chainsaw, they're just as dead either way. When I say 'chainsaw,' you have to pay attention.

As the Wall Street Journal observed, these narratives take place in "prosaic settings", such as malls, hospitals or residential areas, but which are rendered "unfamiliar by adding a surreal, disorienting twist," and employed in the exploration of contemporary issues such as abortion, racism, commercialism, and cyclical violence.

Throughout, the book variously explores the theme of black experience, in a way that works primarily to inspire "empathy for the marginalized and the feared".

== Reception ==
Publishers Weekly along with the New York Post listed Friday Black as one of the best books of the week. BuzzFeed and The Huffington Post both named it among the top releases of Fall 2018.

In a starred review, Kirkus Reviews described the book as a work where "edgy humor and fierce imagery coexist ... with shrewd characterization and humane intelligence, inspired by volatile material sliced off the front pages," while Newsday praised it as "caustically inventive", with a pervasive anger communicated through "nuance, grace and a probing empathy". Writer George Saunders dubbed the work as "an excitement and a wonder: strange, crazed, urgent and funny."

In response to Friday Black, the National Book Foundation named Nana Kwame Adjei-Brenyah among their "5 Under 35 Authors" for 2018, chosen by author Colson Whitehead. The book was included on the long list for the Andrew Carnegie Medals for Excellence in Fiction and Nonfiction.

Friday Black is the recipient of the $75,000 2019 PEN/Jean Stein Book Award and shortlisted for the 2019 Dylan Thomas Prize.
