= Mark Twain American Voice in Literature Award =

- Awarded for: A work of fiction from the previous calendar year that defines contemporary America
- Sponsored by: David Baldacci, Michelle Baldacci, and Bank of America
- Country: United States
- Presented by: Mark Twain House
- Reward: US$25,000
- First award: 2017; 9 years ago
- Currently held by: Ben Shattuck
- Website: Official website

The Mark Twain American Voice in Literature Award is a literary prize given annually by the Mark Twain House. It celebrates writing that represents "modern voices that define our current America," similarly to how Adventures of Huckleberry Finn played an iconic role in "establishing a uniquely American voice in literature."

T. C. Boyle received the inaugural honor in 2017 for The Harder They Come, and writers received the accolade annually since then, picked from shortlists of approximately five authors per year. The most recent winner is Alice McDermott, who obtained US$25,000 as cash prize.

== Winners and shortlist ==
* Winners

| Year | Author | Work | Ref. |
|---|---|---|---|
| 2017 | T. C. Boyle* | The Harder They Come | |
| 2018 | Bill Beverly* | Dodgers | |
| 2018 | Stuart Nadler | The Inseparables | |
| 2018 | Don DeLillo | Zero K | |
| 2019 | Jesmyn Ward* | Sing, Unburied, Sing | |
| 2020 | Ocean Vuong* | On Earth We're Briefly Gorgeous | |
| 2020 | Kiley Reid | Such a Fun Age | |
| 2020 | Ben Lerner | The Topeka School | |
| 2021 | Stephen Graham Jones* | The Only Good Indians | |
| 2021 | James McBride | Deacon King Kong | |
| 2021 | Amity Gaige | Sea Wife | |
| 2021 | Brit Bennett | The Vanishing Half | |
| 2022 | Dawnie Walton* | The Final Revival of Opal & Nev | |
| 2022 | Ash Davidson | Damnation Spring | |
| 2022 | Kirstin Valdez Quade | The Five Wounds | |
| 2022 | Hermione Hoby | Virtue | |
| 2023 | Jennifer Haigh* | Mercy Street | |
| 2023 | Ling Ma | Bliss Montage | |
| 2023 | Barbara Kingsolver | Demon Copperhead | |
| 2023 | Elizabeth McCracken | The Hero of This Book | |
| 2023 | Andrew Holleran | The Kingdom of Sand | |
| 2023 | Jacinda Townsend | Mother Country | |
| 2023 | Morgan Talty | Night of the Living Rez | |
| 2023 | Tess Gunty | The Rabbit Hutch | |
| 2023 | Gabrielle Zevin | Tomorrow, and Tomorrow, and Tomorrow | |
| 2023 | Hernan Diaz | Trust | |
| 2024 | Alice McDermott* | Absolution | |
| 2024 | Richard Ford | Be Mine | |
| 2024 | Kathleen Alcott | Emergency | |
| 2024 | Jayne Ann Phillips | Night Watch | |
| 2024 | Daniel Mason | North Woods | |
| 2024 | James McBride | The Heaven & Earth Grocery Store | |
| 2024 | Paul Harding | This Other Eden | |
| 2024 | Ann Patchett | Tom Lake | |
| 2024 | Yiyun Li | Wednesday's Child | |
| 2024 | Kelly Link | White Cat, Black Dog | |
| 2025 | Ben Shattuck* | The History of Sound | |
| 2025 | Karen Outen | Dixon, Descending | |
| 2025 | Rufi Thorpe | Margo's Got Money Troubles | |
| 2025 | J. Malcolm Garcia | Out of the Rain | |
