= Young Lions Fiction Award =

American literary award

The Young Lions Fiction Award is an annual US literary prize of $10,000, awarded to a writer who is 35 years old or younger for a novel or collection of short stories. The award was established in 2001 by Ethan Hawke, Jennifer Rudolph Walsh, Rick Moody, Hannah McFarland, and the New York Public Library. Each year, five young fiction writers are selected as finalists by a reading committee of Young Lions members (a New York Public Library membership aimed at people in their 20s and 30s), writers, editors, and librarians. A panel of judges selects the winner.

== Recipients ==
Year	Author	Title	Result	Judges
2001	Mark Z. Danielewski	House of Leaves	Winner	Michael Chabon, A.M. Homes, Francine Prose
2001	David Ebershoff	The Danish Girl	Finalist	Michael Chabon, A.M. Homes, Francine Prose
2001	Myla Goldberg	Bee Season	Finalist	Michael Chabon, A.M. Homes, Francine Prose
2001	Heidi Julavits	The Mineral Palace	Finalist	Michael Chabon, A.M. Homes, Francine Prose
2001	Akhil Sharma	An Obedient Father	Finalist	Michael Chabon, A.M. Homes, Francine Prose
2001	Darin Strauss	Chang and Eng	Finalist	Michael Chabon, A.M. Homes, Francine Prose
2002	Colson Whitehead	John Henry Days	Winner	Andrea Barrett, Mark Z. Danielewski, Jonathan Lethem
2002	David Czuchlewski	The Muse Asylum	Finalist	Andrea Barrett, Mark Z. Danielewski, Jonathan Lethem
2002	Allegra Goodman	Paradise Park	Finalist	Andrea Barrett, Mark Z. Danielewski, Jonathan Lethem
2002	Peter Orner	Esther Stories	Finalist	Andrea Barrett, Mark Z. Danielewski, Jonathan Lethem
2002	Brady Udall	The Miracle Life of Edgar Mint	Finalist	Andrea Barrett, Mark Z. Danielewski, Jonathan Lethem
2003	Anthony Doerr	The Shell Collector	Winner	Joyce Carol Oates, Caryl Phillips, Colson Whitehead
2003	Jonathan Safran Foer	Everything Is Illuminated	Winner	Joyce Carol Oates, Caryl Phillips, Colson Whitehead
2003	Adam Johnson	Emporium	Finalist	Joyce Carol Oates, Caryl Phillips, Colson Whitehead
2003	Ben Marcus	Notable American Women	Finalist	Joyce Carol Oates, Caryl Phillips, Colson Whitehead
2003	Peter Rock	The Ambidextrist	Finalist	Joyce Carol Oates, Caryl Phillips, Colson Whitehead
2004	Monique Truong	The Book of Salt	Winner	Anthony Doerr, Jonathan Safran Foer, Maureen Howard
2004	Jordan Ellenberg	The Grasshopper King	Finalist	Anthony Doerr, Jonathan Safran Foer, Maureen Howard
2004	Susan Choi	American Woman	Finalist	Anthony Doerr, Jonathan Safran Foer, Maureen Howard
2004	Lara Vapnyar	There Are Jews in My House	Finalist	Anthony Doerr, Jonathan Safran Foer, Maureen Howard
2004	Maile Meloy	Liars and Saints	Finalist	Anthony Doerr, Jonathan Safran Foer, Maureen Howard
2005	Andrew Sean Greer	The Confessions of Max Tivoli	Winner	Siri Hustvedt, Colum McCann, Monique Truong
2005	Marc Bojanowski	The Dog Fighter	Finalist	Siri Hustvedt, Colum McCann, Monique Truong
2005	Sarah Shun-lien Bynum	Madeleine Is Sleeping	Finalist	Siri Hustvedt, Colum McCann, Monique Truong
2005	Stephen Elliott	Happy Baby	Finalist	Siri Hustvedt, Colum McCann, Monique Truong
2005	Aaron Gwyn	Dog on the Cross	Finalist	Siri Hustvedt, Colum McCann, Monique Truong
2006	Uzodinma Iweala	Beasts of No Nation	Winner	Rick Moody, Edmund White, Andrew Sean Greer
2006	Rattawut Lapcharoensap	Sightseeing	Finalist	Rick Moody, Edmund White, Andrew Sean Greer
2006	Kelly Link	Magic for Beginners	Finalist	Rick Moody, Edmund White, Andrew Sean Greer
2006	Ander Monson	Other Electricities	Finalist	Rick Moody, Edmund White, Andrew Sean Greer
2006	Eric Puchner	Music Through the Floor	Finalist	Rick Moody, Edmund White, Andrew Sean Greer
2007	Olga Grushin	The Dream Life of Sukhanov	Winner	Kathryn Harrison, Jeff Talarigo, Uzodinma Iweala
2007	Chris Adrian	The Children's Hospital	Finalist	Kathryn Harrison, Jeff Talarigo, Uzodinma Iweala
2007	Kevin Brockmeier	The Brief History of the Dead	Finalist	Kathryn Harrison, Jeff Talarigo, Uzodinma Iweala
2007	Tony D'Souza	Whiteman	Finalist	Kathryn Harrison, Jeff Talarigo, Uzodinma Iweala
2007	Karen Russell	St. Lucy's Home for Girls Raised by Wolves	Finalist	Kathryn Harrison, Jeff Talarigo, Uzodinma Iweala
2008	Ron Currie, Jr	God Is Dead	Winner	Olga Grushin, Han Ong, Helen Schulman
2008	Ellen Litman	The Last Chicken In America	Finalist	Olga Grushin, Han Ong, Helen Schulman
2008	Peter Nathaniel Malae	Teach the Free Man	Finalist	Olga Grushin, Han Ong, Helen Schulman
2008	Dinaw Mengestu	The Beautiful Things That Heaven Bears	Finalist	Olga Grushin, Han Ong, Helen Schulman
2008	Emily Mitchell	The Last Summer of the World	Finalist	Olga Grushin, Han Ong, Helen Schulman
2009	Salvatore Scibona	The End	Winner	André Aciman, Lore Segal, Ron Currie, Jr.
2009	Jon Fasman	The Unpossessed City	Finalist	André Aciman, Lore Segal, Ron Currie, Jr.
2009	Rivka Galchen	Atmospheric Disturbances	Finalist	André Aciman, Lore Segal, Ron Currie, Jr.
2009	Sana Krasikov	One More Year	Finalist	André Aciman, Lore Segal, Ron Currie, Jr.
2009	Zachary Mason	The Lost Books of the Odyssey	Finalist	André Aciman, Lore Segal, Ron Currie, Jr.
2010	Wells Tower	Everything Ravaged, Everything Burned	Winner	Amy Hempel, Rick Moody, Salvatore Scibona
2010	Jedediah Berry	The Manual of Detection	Finalist	Amy Hempel, Rick Moody, Salvatore Scibona
2010	Katie Kitamura	The Longshot	Finalist	Amy Hempel, Rick Moody, Salvatore Scibona
2010	Philipp Meyer	American Rust	Finalist	Amy Hempel, Rick Moody, Salvatore Scibona
2010	C. E. Morgan	All the Living	Finalist	Amy Hempel, Rick Moody, Salvatore Scibona
2011	Adam Levin	The Instructions	Winner	Maile Chapman, Andrew Sean Greer, Kelly Link
2011	John Brandon	Citrus County	Finalist	Maile Chapman, Andrew Sean Greer, Kelly Link
2011	Patricia Engel	Vida Suzanne	Finalist	Maile Chapman, Andrew Sean Greer, Kelly Link
2011	Suzanne Rivecca	Death Is Not an Option	Finalist	Maile Chapman, Andrew Sean Greer, Kelly Link
2011	Teddy Wayne	Kapitoil	Finalist	Maile Chapman, Andrew Sean Greer, Kelly Link
2012	Karen Russell	Swamplandia!	Winner	Álvaro Enrigue, A.M. Homes, Adam Levin
2012	Teju Cole	Open City	Finalist	Álvaro Enrigue, A.M. Homes, Adam Levin
2012	Benjamin Hale	The Evolution of Bruno	Finalist	Álvaro Enrigue, A.M. Homes, Adam Levin
2012	Ben Lerner	Leaving the Atocha Station	Finalist	Álvaro Enrigue, A.M. Homes, Adam Levin
2012	Jesmyn Ward	Salvage the Bones	Finalist	Álvaro Enrigue, A.M. Homes, Adam Levin
2013	Claire Vaye Watkins	Battleborn	Winner	Karen Russell, John Wray, Peter Nathaniel Malae
2013	Ramona Ausubel	No One Is Here Except All of Us	Finalist	Karen Russell, John Wray, Peter Nathaniel Malae
2013	Joshua Cohen	Four New Messages	Finalist	Karen Russell, John Wray, Peter Nathaniel Malae
2013	Katie Kitamura	Gone to the Forest	Finalist	Karen Russell, John Wray, Peter Nathaniel Malae
2013	Kevin Powers	The Yellow Birds	Finalist	Karen Russell, John Wray, Peter Nathaniel Malae
2014	Paul Yoon	Snow Hunters	Winner	Téa Obreht, Colm Tóibín, Claire Vaye Watkins
2014	Matt Bell	In the House Upon the Dirt Between the Lake and the Woods	Finalist	Téa Obreht, Colm Tóibín, Claire Vaye Watkins
2014	Jennifer duBois	Cartwheel	Finalist	Téa Obreht, Colm Tóibín, Claire Vaye Watkins
2014	Anthony Marra	A Constellation of Vital Phenomena	Finalist	Téa Obreht, Colm Tóibín, Claire Vaye Watkins
2014	Chinelo Okparanta	Happiness, Like Water	Finalist	Téa Obreht, Colm Tóibín, Claire Vaye Watkins
2015	Molly Antopol	The UnAmericans	Winner	Ayana Mathis, Rebecca Mead, Paul Yoon
2015	Jesse Ball	Silence Once Begun	Finalist	Ayana Mathis, Rebecca Mead, Paul Yoon
2015	Catherine Lacey	Nobody Is Ever Missing	Finalist	Ayana Mathis, Rebecca Mead, Paul Yoon
2015	Andrew Ladd	What Ends	Finalist	Ayana Mathis, Rebecca Mead, Paul Yoon
2015	Ben Lerner	10:04	Finalist	Ayana Mathis, Rebecca Mead, Paul Yoon
2016	Amelia Gray	Gutshot	Winner	Molly Antopol, Joseph O'Neill, Alejandro Zambra
2016	Angela Flournoy	The Turner House	Finalist	Molly Antopol, Joseph O'Neill, Alejandro Zambra
2016	Alexandra Kleeman	You Too Can Have a Body Like Mine	Finalist	Molly Antopol, Joseph O'Neill, Alejandro Zambra
2016	Helen Phillips	The Beautiful Bureaucrat	Finalist	Molly Antopol, Joseph O'Neill, Alejandro Zambra
2016	Kirstin Valdez Quade	Night at the Fiestas	Finalist	Molly Antopol, Joseph O'Neill, Alejandro Zambra
2017	Karan Mahajan	The Association of Small Bombs	Winner	Amelia Gray, Susan Minot, Salvatore Scibona
2017	Clare Beams	We Show What We Have Learned	Finalist	Amelia Gray, Susan Minot, Salvatore Scibona
2017	Brit Bennett	The Mothers	Finalist	Amelia Gray, Susan Minot, Salvatore Scibona
2017	Nicole Dennis-Benn	Here Comes the Sun	Finalist	Amelia Gray, Susan Minot, Salvatore Scibona
2017	Kaitlyn Greenidge	We Love You Charlie Freeman	Finalist	Amelia Gray, Susan Minot, Salvatore Scibona
2018	Lesley Nneka Arimah	What It Means When a Man Falls from the Sky	Winner	Carys Davies, Lynn Lobash, Karan Mahajan
2018	Venita Blackburn	Black Jesus and Other Superheroes	Finalist	Carys Davies, Lynn Lobash, Karan Mahajan
2018	Gabe Habash	Stephen Florida	Finalist	Carys Davies, Lynn Lobash, Karan Mahajan
2018	Emily Ruskovich	Idaho	Finalist	Carys Davies, Lynn Lobash, Karan Mahajan
2018	Jenny Zhang	Sour Heart	Finalist	Carys Davies, Lynn Lobash, Karan Mahajan
2019	Ling Ma	Severance	Winner	Lesley Nneka Arimah, Tayari Jones, Marisa Silver
2019	Nana Kwame Adjei-Brenyah	Friday Black	Finalist	Lesley Nneka Arimah, Tayari Jones, Marisa Silver
2019	Nick Drnaso	Sabrina	Finalist	Lesley Nneka Arimah, Tayari Jones, Marisa Silver
2019	Akwaeke Emezi	Freshwater	Finalist	Lesley Nneka Arimah, Tayari Jones, Marisa Silver
2019	Laura van den Berg	The Third Hotel	Finalist	Lesley Nneka Arimah, Tayari Jones, Marisa Silver
2020	Bryan Washington	Lot	Winner	Ethan Hawke, Mitchell Jackson, Ling Ma
2020	Steph Cha	Your House Will Pay	Finalist	Ethan Hawke, Mitchell Jackson, Ling Ma
2020	Julia Phillips	Disappearing Earth	Finalist	Ethan Hawke, Mitchell Jackson, Ling Ma
2020	Kiley Reid	Such a Fun Age	Finalist	Ethan Hawke, Mitchell Jackson, Ling Ma
2020	Xuan Juliana Wang	Home Remedies	Finalist	Ethan Hawke, Mitchell Jackson, Ling Ma
2021	Catherine Lacey	Pew	Winner	Hernan Diaz, Emma Straub, Yahdon Israel
2021	Meng Jin	Little Gods	Finalist	Hernan Diaz, Emma Straub, Yahdon Israel
2021	Hilary Leichter	Temporary	Finalist	Hernan Diaz, Emma Straub, Yahdon Israel
2021	Brandon Taylor	Real Life	Finalist	Hernan Diaz, Emma Straub, Yahdon Israel
2021	C Pam Zhang	How Much of These Hills Is Gold	Finalist	Hernan Diaz, Emma Straub, Yahdon Israel
2022	Kalani Pickhart	I Will Die in a Foreign Land	Winner	Venita Blackburn, Jonas Hassen Khemiri, Catherine Lacey
2022	Mateo Askaripour	Black Buck	Finalist	Venita Blackburn, Jonas Hassen Khemiri, Catherine Lacey
2022	Alexandra Kleeman	Something Under the Sun	Finalist	Venita Blackburn, Jonas Hassen Khemiri, Catherine Lacey
2022	Tom Lin	The Thousand Crimes of Ming Tsu	Finalist	Venita Blackburn, Jonas Hassen Khemiri, Catherine Lacey
2022	Dantiel W. Moniz	Milk Blood Heat	Finalist	Venita Blackburn, Jonas Hassen Khemiri, Catherine Lacey
2023	Zain Khalid	Brother Alive	Winner	Jessamine Chan, Claire Luchette, Kalani Pickhart
2023	Fatimah Asghar	When We Were Sisters	Finalist	Jessamine Chan, Claire Luchette, Kalani Pickhart
2023	Elaine Hsieh Chou	Disorientation	Finalist	Jessamine Chan, Claire Luchette, Kalani Pickhart
2023	Reyes Ramirez	The Book of Wanderers	Finalist	Jessamine Chan, Claire Luchette, Kalani Pickhart
2023	David Sanchez	All Day Is a Long Time	Finalist	Jessamine Chan, Claire Luchette, Kalani Pickhart
2024	E. J. Koh	The Liberators	Winner	A. M. Homes, Caoilinn Hughes, Zain Khalid
2024	Nana Kwame Adjei-Brenyah	Chain Gang All-Stars	Finalist	A. M. Homes, Caoilinn Hughes, Zain Khalid
2024	Monica Brashears	House of Cotton	Finalist	A. M. Homes, Caoilinn Hughes, Zain Khalid
2024	Eskor David Johnson	Pay as You Go	Finalist	A. M. Homes, Caoilinn Hughes, Zain Khalid
2024	C Pam Zhang	Land of Milk and Honey	Finalist	A. M. Homes, Caoilinn Hughes, Zain Khalid
2025	Alexander Sammartino	Last Acts	Winner	Adam Levin, A.M. Homes, Álvaro Enrigue
2025	'Pemi Aguda	Ghostroots	Finalist	Adam Levin, A.M. Homes, Álvaro Enrigue
2025	Eliza Barry Callahan	The Hearing Test	Finalist	Adam Levin, A.M. Homes, Álvaro Enrigue
2025	Santiago Jose Sanchez	Hombrecito	Finalist	Adam Levin, A.M. Homes, Álvaro Enrigue
2025	Karla Cornejo Villavicencio	Catalina	Finalist	Adam Levin, A.M. Homes, Álvaro Enrigue
2026	Carrie R. Moore	Make Your Way Home	Winner	Raven Leilani, Alexander Sammartino, Nana Kwame Adjei-Brenyah
2026	Ariel Courage	Bad Nature	Finalist	Raven Leilani, Alexander Sammartino, Nana Kwame Adjei-Brenyah
2026	Kyle Edwards	Small Ceremonies	Finalist	Raven Leilani, Alexander Sammartino, Nana Kwame Adjei-Brenyah
2026	Harris Lahti	Foreclosure Gothic	Finalist	Raven Leilani, Alexander Sammartino, Nana Kwame Adjei-Brenyah
2026	Stephanie Wambugu	Lonely Crowds	Finalist	Raven Leilani, Alexander Sammartino, Nana Kwame Adjei-Brenyah
