= Wang Xuan =

Wang Xuan may refer to:

- Wang Xuan (Second Zhou) (fl. 692–703), prime minister during Wu Zetian's reign
- Wang Xuan (computer scientist) (1937–2006), Chinese computer scientist
- Xuan Juliana Wang (王轩, Wáng Xuān, born 1985), Chinese-American writer
- Wang Xuan (water polo), (born 2002), Chinese water polo player
