= Battleborn =

Battleborn or Battle Born may refer to:

- Nevada, a U.S. state nicknamed the 'Battle Born State' due to being admitted into the union during the American Civil War
- Battleborn (video game), by Gearbox Software, 2016
- Battleborn (book), a short story collection by Claire Vaye Watkins, 2012
- Battle Born (album), by the Killers, 2012, or the title track
- "Battle Born" (song), a song by Five Finger Death Punch, 2013
- Battle Born Studios, a recording studio owned by the Killers in Las Vegas, Nevada
