= Bubblegum (disambiguation) =

Bubble gum is a type of chewing gum.

Bubblegum may also refer to:

== Music ==
- Bubblegum music, a type of pop music

=== Albums and mixtapes ===
- Bubblegum (Mark Lanegan album), 2004
- Bubblegum (Clinic album), 2010
- Bubblegum (mixtape), 2023 mixtape by Biig Piig

=== Songs ===
- "Bubblegum" (B.G. & Chopper City Boyz song), 2008
- "Bubblegum" (Jason Derulo song), 2014
- "Bubblegum", a song by Mystery Jets, 2016
- "Bubblegum", a song by All Time Low from Everyone's Talking!, 2025
- "Bubblegum", a song by The Stunners, 2009
- "Bubblegum", a single by Cigarettes After Sex, 2023
- "Bubblegum", a 2004 single by Silver Sun from Disappear Here
- "Bubble Gum" (NewJeans song), 2024
- "Bubble Gum", a single by Clairo, 2018

== Other entertainment ==
- Bubble Gum (TV series), a South Korean tvN television series
- Bubble Gum (film), a 2011 Hindi film
- Bubblegum (novel), a 2020 novel by Adam Levin
- Bubblegum (film), a 2023 Telugu film

== Persons both real and fictional ==
- Bubblegum (wrestler) (born 1984), ring name for British professional wrestler Phil Blitz
- Princess Bubblegum of the animated television series Adventure Time

== See also ==
- Bubble Gang, a sketch comedy show
