= The Möbius Book =

2025 book by Catherine Lacey

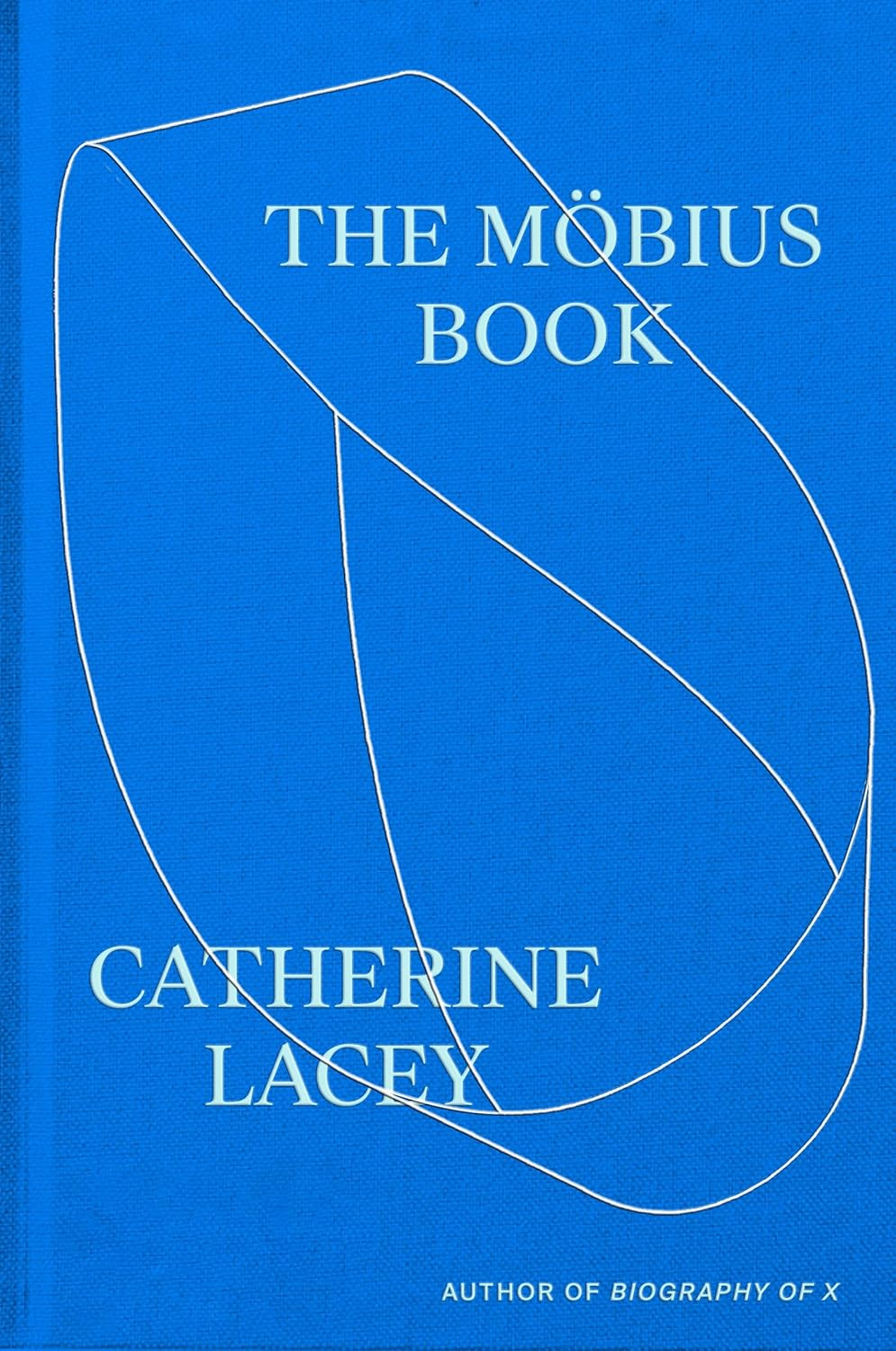
- Book cover
- Author: Catherine Lacey
- Audio read by: Gabra Zackman
- Subject: Depression, Anorexia
- Genre: fiction, nonfiction
- Published: 2025
- Publisher: Farrar, Straus and Giroux
- Publication place: United States
- Media type: Print, eBook, Audio
- Pages: 240
- Awards: 2025 Most anticipated book by multiple media outlets
- ISBN: 9780374615406
- OCLC: 1493079431
- Website: Official website

The Möbius Book is a hybrid work consisting of a memoir and novella written by the author Catherine Lacey. It was published on June 17, 2025 by Farrar, Straus and Giroux. The impetus for the book was a breakup followed by a depression.

== Reception ==
Kirkus Reviews gave The Möbius Book a starred review and called the work "a genre-bending book that grapples with the diffuse and uncategorizable enormity of personal loss...There are no easy endings in this doubled book, just an infinity loop of questions and possibilities, a twinned bank of pay phones ringing in the night, waiting for someone to answer."

It was a finalist for the 2026 Lambda Literary Award for Bisexual Nonfiction.
