= Ron Currie Jr. =

American novelist

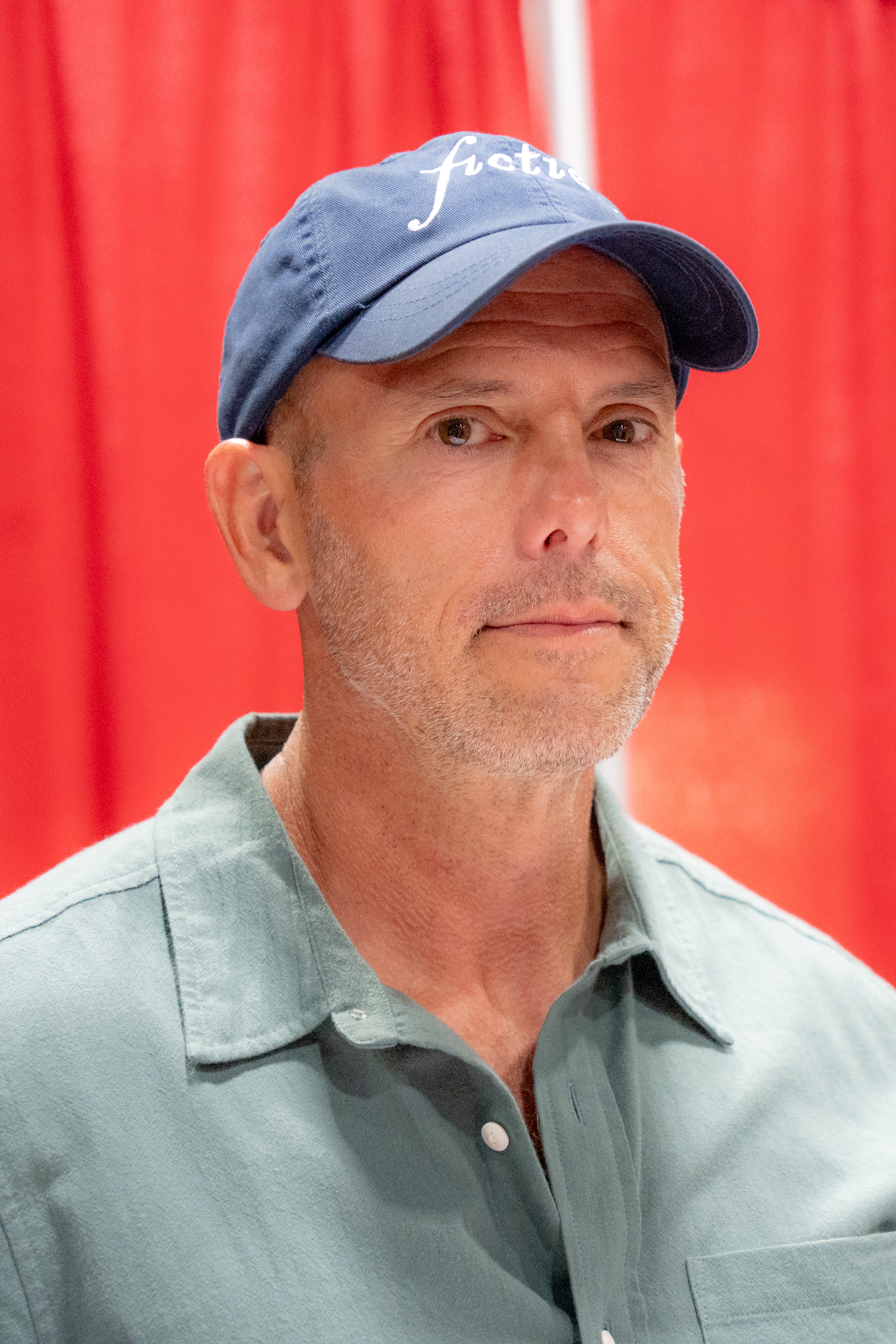
- Currie at the National Book Festival 2025
- Born: 1975 (age 50–51); Waterville, Maine
- Occupation: Novelist
- Writing career
- Genre: Literary Fiction
- Website: www.roncurrieauthor.com

Ron Currie Jr. is an American author.

== Background and education ==
Currie was raised in Waterville and lives in Portland, Maine. He attended Clemson University and withdrew before graduation.

== Career ==
Currie's first book, God is Dead, was published to critical acclaim in 2007, earning Currie comparisons to Kurt Vonnegut and Raymond Carver. God is Dead received the Young Lions Fiction Award from the New York Public Library, as well as the Metcalf award from the American Academy of Arts and Letters. Critics praised the book's daring mix of dark humor and earnest sentiment. Andrew Ervin, writing in The Believer, said "few authors would dare to depict the near rape and death of God amid a horrendous genocidal war, and fewer still could make it so bladder-threateningly hilarious." Bookpage said "Each of the chapter-length stories seem to have emerged from a fever dream, sampling alternate futures that spring up like mutant weeds." God is Dead was named a notable book of 2007 by the San Francisco Chronicle.

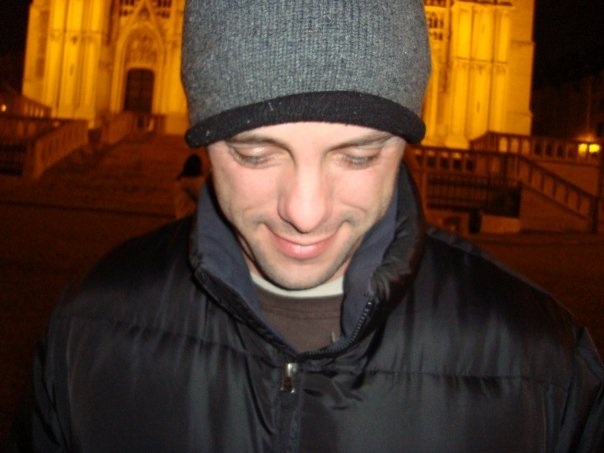
Currie in 2009

Currie published his first full-length novel, Everything Matters!, in 2009. The winner of an Alex Award from the American Library Association, Everything Matters! made several best-of lists for 2009, including the Los Angeles Times, National Public Radio, and Amazon.com. Writing in the New York Times, Janet Maslin called Currie a "startlingly talented writer" who "survives the inevitable, apt comparisons to Kurt Vonnegut and writes in a tenderly mordant voice of his own."

Currie's third book, the novel Flimsy Little Plastic Miracles, was published by Viking in February, 2013. The New Yorker called it the writer's "most grounded work yet and perhaps his darkest." "Anything does seem possible in Currie's fantastical fiction...Currie's gorgeously questioning prose explores the deeper meanings things gain after they're gone."

Currie is also a screenwriter, most recently working on the Apple TV+ series Extrapolations.

== Awards and honors ==
Currie's writing has won the New York Public Library Young Lions Award, the Addison M. Metcalf Award from the American Academy of Arts and Letters, and the Alex Award from the American Library Association.

== Selected works ==
- God Is Dead (2007)
- Everything Matters! (2009)
- Flimsy Little Plastic Miracles (2013)
- The One-Eyed Man (2017)
- The Savage, Noble Death of Babs Dionne (2025)
- We Will See You Bleed (2026)
