= Catherine Lacey (author) =

American writer (born 1985)

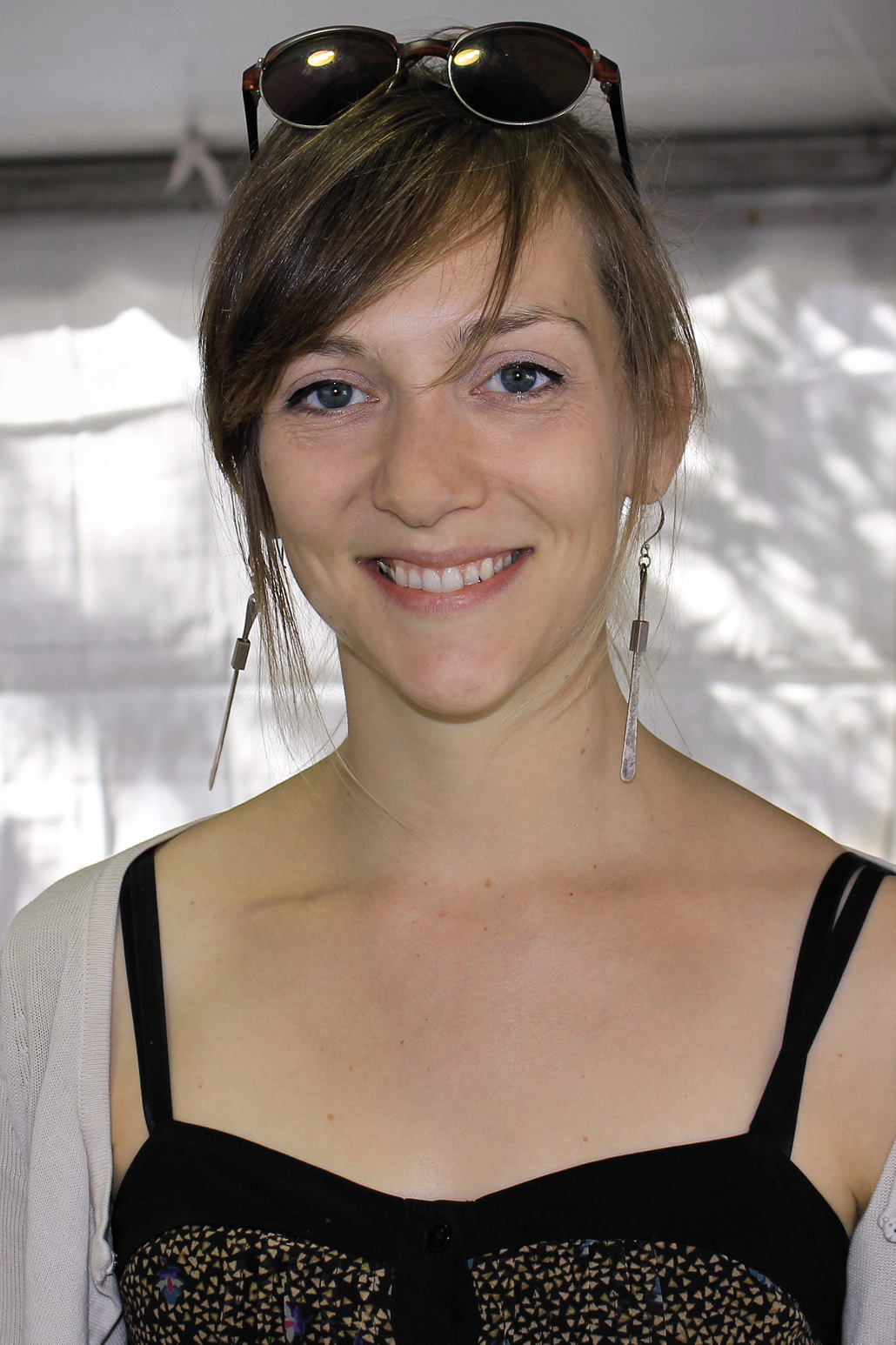
- Lacey in 2015
- Born: April 9, 1985 (age 41); Tupelo, Mississippi, U.S.
- Education: Loyola University New Orleans (BA); Columbia University (MFA)
- Occupation: Novelist
- Partner: Daniel Saldaña París
- Writing career
- Language: English
- Notable works: Biography of X Pew
- Notable awards: Whiting Award (2016); Guggenheim Fellowship (2019); Young Lions Fiction Award (2021); Lambda Literary Award (2024)
- Website: www.catherinelacey.com

Catherine Lacey (born April 9, 1985) is an American writer. She is the author of the award winning novels Biography of X and Pew. She is the recipient of a 2016 Whiting Award and 2019 Guggenheim Fellowship for fiction.

== Early life and education ==
Lacey was born in Tupelo, Mississippi. She received her undergraduate degree from Loyola University New Orleans, where she majored in visual arts and writing. She earned a Master of Fine Arts in Creative Nonfiction from Columbia University in 2010.

== Career ==
Lacey was a founding member of 3B, a cooperatively owned and operated bed and breakfast in downtown Brooklyn, where she lived while she wrote her first novel. In 2012, Lacey won an Artists' Fellowship from the New York Foundation for the Arts that she credits for giving her the financial freedom to finish Nobody Is Ever Missing.

Nobody Is Ever Missing was published by Farrar, Straus and Giroux. In The New York Times, Dwight Garner called Lacey's prose "dreamy and fierce at the same time." Time Out named it "the (hands down) best book of the year." It also made The New Yorker's list of the best books of 2014. It has been translated into Dutch, Spanish, Italian, French, and German. The novel was a finalist for the New York Public Library's 2015 Young Lions Fiction Award.

In 2017, Lacey was named one of Granta's Best of Young American Novelists. Her second novel, The Answers (2017), was also published by Farrar, Straus and Giroux. It received several favorable reviews and comparisons to Don DeLillo and Margaret Atwood. In an interview with Vogue, Lacey said: "Even the person who wrote Nobody Is Ever Missing, I can't really speak on her behalf anymore. The text is kind of what's left of that person, and that person doesn't exist anymore. It both makes me very uncomfortable and very relaxed, because who you are and what you think that you're attached to vanishes very quickly."

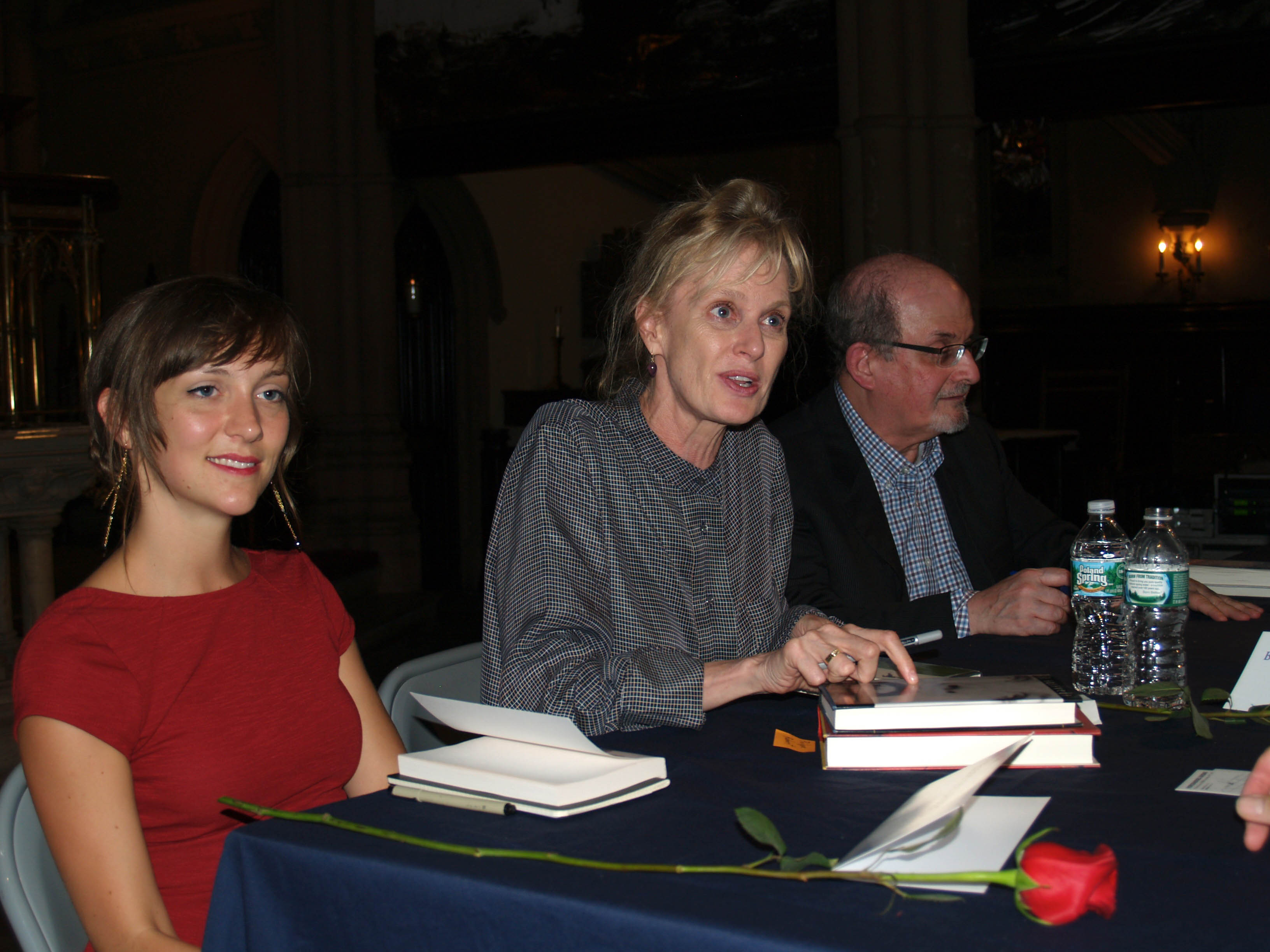
From left: Lacey, Siri Hustvedt, and Salman Rushdie at a panel on "The Writer's Life" at the 2014 Brooklyn Book Festival

Lacey's 2020 novel Pew was shortlisted for the 2021 Dylan Thomas Prize. It won the New York Public Library's 2021 Young Lions Fiction Award. In a starred review, Kirkus Reviews wrote: "Setting her third novel in a placid town built on a foundation of unspeakable violence, Lacey—spare and elegant as ever—creates a story that feels at the same time mythological and arrestingly like life. Darkly playful; a warning without a moral."

Lacey's fourth novel, Biography of X, a fictional biography and alternative history, was published in 2023. The New Statesman said the book "thrillingly subverts the conventions of life-writing." Time named it one of "the 100 must-read books of 2023." The novel was shortlisted for the 2024 Dylan Thomas Prize. It won the 2024 Lambda Literary Award for Lesbian Fiction. Kirkus Reviews (starred review) wrote, "Breathtaking in its scope and rigor, this unforgettable novel pushes contemporary fiction to dizzying heights."

Lacey's hybrid memoir/fiction novella, The Möbius Book, was released in June 2025. Kirkus Reviews gave it a starred review, calling it "a genre-bending book that grapples with the diffuse and uncategorizable enormity of personal loss." The Möbius Book was a finalist for the 2026 Lambda Literary Award for Bisexual Nonfiction.

Lacey's second short-story collection, My Stalkers, is set for release in January 2027. The book received a starred review from Publishers Weekly, which called it "a bracing and discomfiting collection of nine stories that range from the nearly realistic to the wildly surreal."

== Personal life ==
In August 2015, Lacey married actor and teacher Peter Musante; they divorced the next year. Lacey was partnered with writer Jesse Ball from 2016 to 2021. As of 2024, she is married to the writer Daniel Saldaña París. The couple live in Mexico City.

Lacey has taught in the writing program at Columbia University's School of the Arts.

== Bibliography ==
=== Novels ===
- —— (2014). Nobody Is Ever Missing (paperback 1st ed.). New York: Farrar, Straus and Giroux. ISBN 9780374711283.
- —— (2017). The Answers (hardcover 1st ed.). New York: Farrar, Straus and Giroux. ISBN 9780374100261.
- —— (2020). Pew (hardcover 1st ed.). New York: Farrar, Straus and Giroux. ISBN 9780374230920.
- —— (2023). Biography of X (hardcover 1st ed.). New York: Farrar, Straus and Giroux. ISBN 9780374606176.

=== Collections ===
- —— (2018). Certain American States: Stories. Farrar, Straus and Giroux. ISBN 9780374714352.
- —— (2027). My Stalkers: Stories. Farrar, Straus and Giroux. ISBN 9780374615444.

=== Hybrid (memoir/novella) ===
- —— (2025). The Möbius Book. New York: Farrar, Straus & Giroux. ISBN 978-0374615406.

=== Nonfiction ===
- —— (2017). The Art of the Affair: An Illustrated History of Love, Sex, and Artistic Influence. Illustrated by Forsyth Harmon. Bloomsbury. ISBN 9781632866554.
