= Biography of X =

2023 novel by Catherine Lacey

- First edition cover
- Author: Catherine Lacey
- Language: English
- Publisher: Farrar, Straus and Giroux
- Publication date: 2023
- Awards: Lambda Literary Award (2024)

Biography of X is a 2023 alternative history novel by American writer Catherine Lacey published by Farrar, Straus and Giroux.

== Plot summary ==
The novel purports to be a 2005 biography of the musician and artist X, written by her widow, C.M. Lucca, as a response to an unauthorized and apparently inaccurate biography of her wife written after her death. The novel takes place in an alternate timeline in which the Southern states of the United States seceded in 1945 after building a wall segregating them from the rest of the country.

== Writing and publication ==
Lacey initially wanted to write a biography of a living person, but was encouraged not to do so by one of her teachers. Lacey ceased working on the biography, and instead decided to work on a fictional biography. The book includes fictional citations and end notes; Lacey, for the most part, devised these as she wrote the novel rather than after she was finished. To track "timelines and characters" as she wrote the book, Lacey utilized a "disorganized document". Copy editors at Farrar, Straus and Giroux assisted Lacey as she produced the novel.

To write the novel, Lacey read a number of biographies and read interviews with artists from different disciplines.

== Reception ==
The novel received starred reviews from Kirkus Reviews, Library Journal, and Publishers Weekly.

Dwight Garner, in a positive review in The New York Times, compared Lacey's writing to that of Renata Adler and Janet Malcolm. Sam Sacks praised the "audacity" of Biography of X in a review published by The Wall Street Journal. Sacks further wrote that the novel was "likely" to give Lacey "a much wider audience" and wrote that she "deserved" a broader base of readers. In a review published by The Los Angeles Times, Jessica Ferri praised Lacey as "one of the most fearless novelists writing today".

Audrey Wollen, writing for The New Yorker, referred to the novel as "[acting] more as a blender than a quilt-maker" in reference to Lacey's inclusion of real-life figures and quotes, re-contextualized in the novel's alternate history.

Publishers Weekly included Biography of X in their list of the top ten books of 2023. In March 2024, The Atlantic included Biography of X in its list of "Great American Novels" that have been published in the past century.

It won the 2023 Brooklyn Public Library Book Prize for fiction and the 2024 Lambda Literary Award for Lesbian Fiction.
