= Carrie R. Moore =

American writer and the author

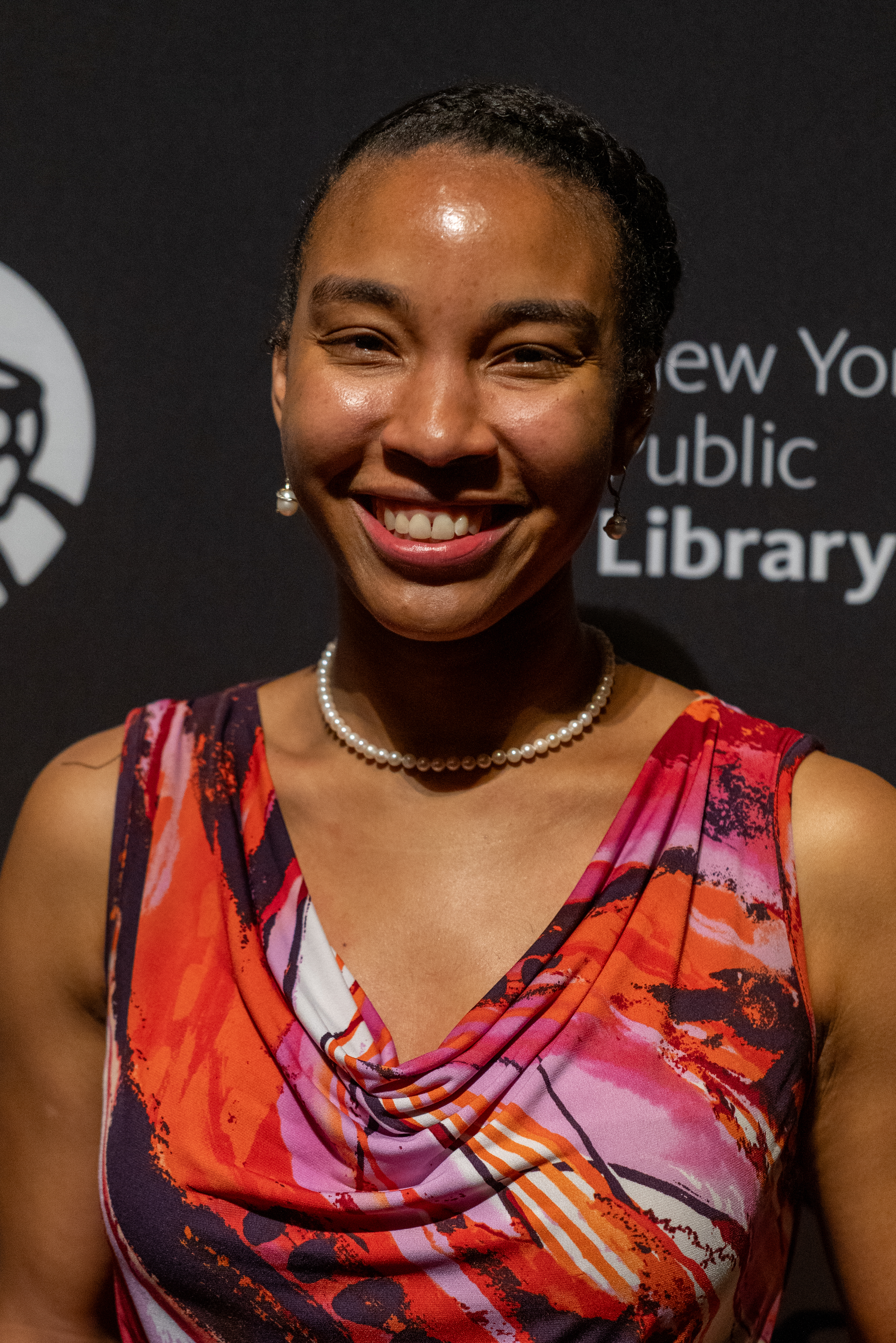
- Carrie R. Moore at 26th Young Lions Fiction Awards 2026
- Born: Atlanta, Georgia, U.S.
- Education: University of Southern California (BA); The University of Texas at Austin (MFA)
- Occupation: Writer
- Awards: 5 Under 35 Honoree (2026); Young Lions Fiction Award (2026)
- Website: www.carriermoore.com

Carrie R. Moore is an American writer and the author of Make Your Way Home, a debut collection of short stories that was published in 2025 by Tin House.

She was named a 2026 "5 Under 35" Honoree by the National Book Foundation.

== Early life and education ==
Moore was born and raised in Atlanta, Georgia. She attended University of Southern California, where she majored in Creative Writing and minored in American Studies. She received her Master of Fine Arts in Fiction from The University of Texas at Austin's Michener Center for Writers.

== Career ==
Her fiction has appeared in One Story, New England Review, The Sewanee Review, Virginia Quarterly Review, The Southern Review, and elsewhere.

In 2023, she was the inaugural fellow at the Steinbeck Writers’ Retreat in Sag Harbor, New York. She has received scholarships and fellowships from the Community of Writers, the Sewanee Writers' Conference, and the Martha Heasley Cox Center for Steinbeck Studies.

Moore's debut collection, Make Your Way Home: Stories, was published by Tin House in 2025. It received a starred review from Kirkus Reviews, describing the book as "An intimate, meticulously crafted, and tenderly rendered tour through the lives of Black women, men, and children seeking solid ground in a mercurial American southland. This stirring collection of 11 short stories is a prism of contemporary African American life... A regional relief map of the human heart."

== Personal life ==
Moore lives in Texas with her husband.

== Awards and reception ==
Moore received the 2021 Keene Prize for Literature from The University of Texas at Austin for her story "The Rest of the Morning."

Make Your Way Home won the 2026 Young Lions Fiction Award and the 2026 Anisfield-Wolf Book Award in Fiction. The book was longlisted for the 2026 PEN/Faulkner Award, 2026 PEN Open Book Award, and 2026 The Story Prize.

== Bibliography ==
=== Short story collection ===
- Make Your Way Home: Stories. Tin House. 2025. ISBN 9781963108286.

=== Anthology (featured) ===
- Celeste Ng; Nicole A. Lamy, eds. (2025). The Best American Short Stories 2025. Mariner Books. ISBN 9780063399808.
