= All Day Is a Long Time =

2022 novel by David Sanchez

All Day is a Long Time
- Author: David Sanchez
- Language: English
- Publisher: Mariner Books
- Publication date: 2022
- Publication place: United States

All Day is a Long Time is a 2022 novel by American writer David Sanchez.

== Writing and publication ==
At the time Sanchez was finishing the book he read novels including War and Peace, The Name of the Rose, A Hundred Years of Solitude, and Rabbit, Run. Sanchez has said "poetic asides" in Rabbit, Run influenced All Day is a Long Time.

== Reception and accolades ==
=== Reception ===
In a review published by The Los Angeles Times, Nathan Deuel praised the novel as a "daring and winning debut".

=== Accolades ===
Sanchez was nominated for the Young Lions Fiction Award for the novel.
