= Gold Fame Citrus =

Novel by Claire Vaye Watkins

- Author: Claire Vaye Watkins
- Language: English
- Genre: Fiction
- Publisher: Riverhead Books
- Publication date: 2015
- Publication place: United States
- Media type: Print (hardback & paperback)
- Pages: 352
- ISBN: 978-0-698-19594-3

Gold Fame Citrus is a 2015 speculative fiction novel by Claire Vaye Watkins. It is her second book, but her first novel. The work received positive reviews.

== Plot ==
The novel is set in a near-future dystopian California ravaged by extreme drought. The landscape of the Southwest is increasingly dominated by the rapidly expanding, ever shifting sands known as the Amargosa Dune Sea. Luz Dunn is a 25 year old former model squatting in Los Angeles, where it has not rained for years. As a newborn, Luz was symbolically adopted by the Bureau of Conservation, who used "Baby Dunn" as a propaganda tool to garner public support for water infrastructure expansion efforts and evacuations. Luz and her boyfriend Ray are united with Ig, a neglected toddler about two years old. The novel explores concepts of industry, environment, cults, enduring love, family, breaking intergenerational patterns, renewal, parenthood, and reclaiming.
