= Alexander Sammartino =

American novelist (born 1991)

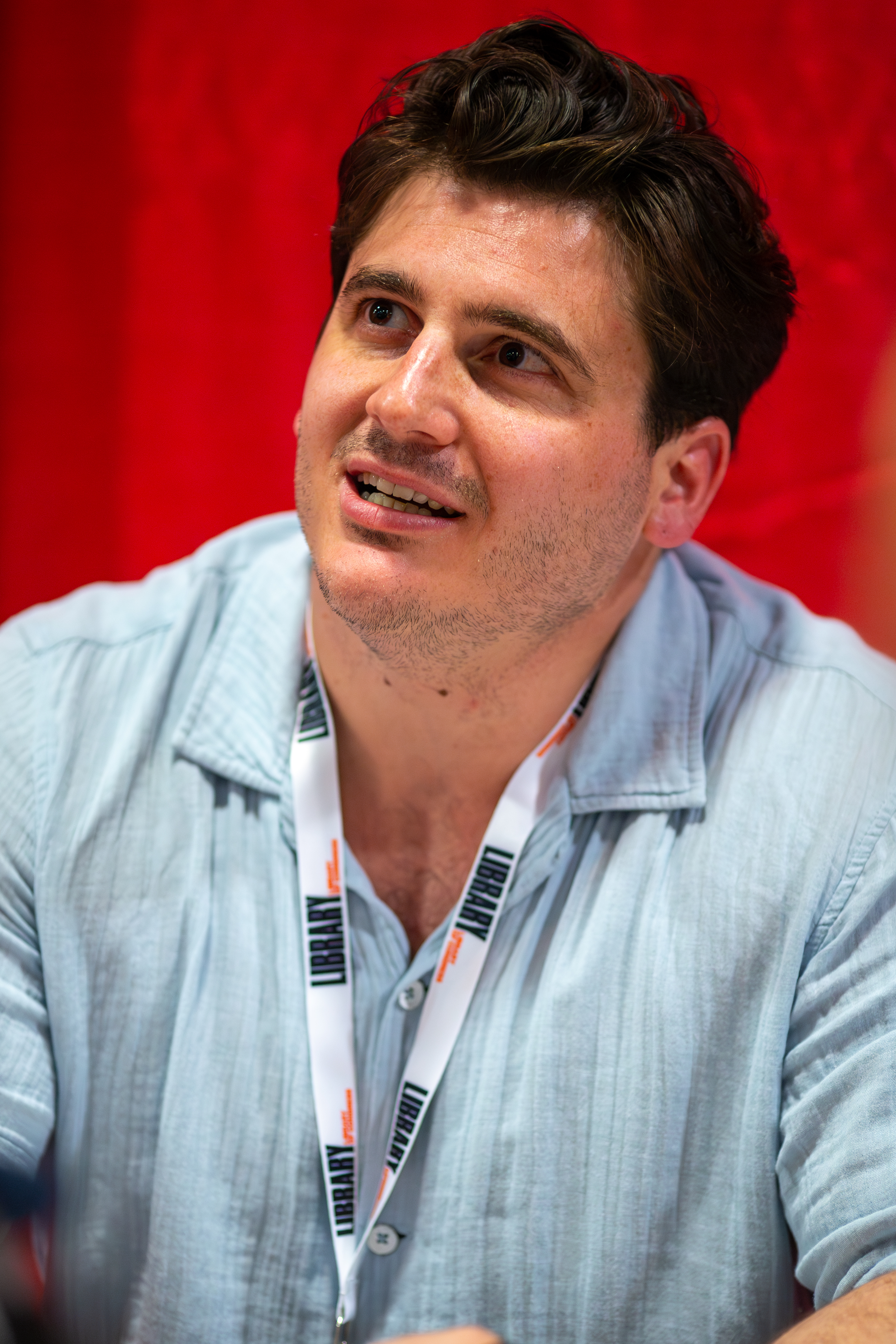
- Sammartino at the 2024 National Book Festival
- Born: 1991 (age 34–35); Providence, Rhode Island, U.S.
- Education: Syracuse University (BA, MFA)
- Occupation: Novelist
- Spouse: Kelley Rowland (m. 2020)
- Awards: 5 Under 35 Honoree (2025); Young Lions Fiction Award (2025)
- Website: alexandersammartino.com

Alexander Sammartino is an American novelist currently living in Brooklyn, New York. In 2024, Sammartino published his debut novel, Last Acts, which the New York Times heralded as hilarious and exceptional. Nylon magazine listed Sammartino's book as a must-read. In 2025, he was a National Book Foundation's 5 Under 35 Honoree.

== Early life and education ==
Sammartino was born in Rhode Island and grew up in Arizona. He majored in Philosophy and English at Syracuse University, where he also received his MFA in Fiction in 2018.

== Career ==
=== Last Acts (2024) ===
Set in Phoenix, Arizona, Last Acts is the satirical story of a father and son with "crackling prose and real depth of feeling." The father, David Rizzo, owns a struggling firearm store that he is on the brink of losing and the son, Nick, is a heroin addict. After a near fatal overdose, Nick reunites with his father and the two embark on a plan to save the father's business. Nick makes a video advertisement for the store, confessing his recent overdose, and promising a percentage of each firearm sale to go to rehabilitation facilities and halfway houses. The advertisement propels the store to local fame and controversy, and hijinks, hope and disaster ensues.

Last Acts addresses several themes in contemporary American society — gun culture, the opioid epidemic, economic uncertainly, polarizing politics, racial inequity, and religious intolerance — with empathy, humanity and grim humor.

=== Gallo (2027) ===
Sammartino's second novel, Gallo, is forthcoming from Scribner/Simon & Schuster in March 2027.

== Personal life ==
He lives in Brooklyn with his wife and their cat, Godot.

== Awards and accolades ==
Last Acts won the 2025 Young Lions Fiction Award and was shortlisted for the 2025 Bollinger Everyman Wodehouse Prize.

Sammartino is the 2026-2027 Mary Ellen von der Heyden Fellow at the New York Public Library's Cullman Center.

== Bibliography ==
=== Novels ===
- Last Acts. Scribner/Simon & Schuster. 2024. ISBN 9781982196769.
- Gallo. Scribner/Simon & Schuster. 2027. ISBN 9781668074374.

=== Short fiction ===
- "Testarossa", Joyland, (2023)
