= Salvatore Scibona =

American novelist and short-story writer (born 1975)

- Born: 1975 (age 50–51); Cleveland, Ohio, U.S.
- Education: St. John's College; Iowa Writers' Workshop (MFA)
- Occupation: Novelist

Salvatore Scibona (born 1975) is an American novelist. He has won awards for his novels as well as short stories, and was selected in 2010 as one of The New Yorker's "20 under 40: Fiction Writers to Watch". His work has been published in ten languages. In 2021 he was awarded the $200,000 Mildred and Harold Strauss Living Award from the American Academy of Arts and Letters for his novel The Volunteer. In its citation the academy wrote, "Salvatore Scibona's work is grand, tragic, epic. His novel The Volunteer, about war, masculinity, abandonment, and grimly executed grace, is an intricate masterpiece of plot, scene, and troubled character. In language both meticulous and extravagant, Scibona brings to the American novel a mythic fury, a fresh greatness."

== Early life and education ==
Salvatore Scibona was born in 1975 in Cleveland, Ohio.

He graduated from St. John's College in 1997 and published an essay about his experience there in The New Yorker. Scibona earned an M.F.A. in 1999 at the Iowa Writers' Workshop at the University of Iowa. The following year he was awarded a Fulbright Fellowship, using it to travel to Italy for research for his first novel, published as The End (2008), which was a finalist for the National Book Award and winner of the Young Lions Fiction Award.

== Career ==
Scibona has written novels, essays, and short stories, the last published in The Threepenny Review, Best New American Voices 2004, The Pushcart Book of Short Stories: The Best Stories from a Quarter-Century of the Pushcart Prize, Harper's Magazine, and The New Yorker.

His work has been recognized by major awards including the Whiting Writers Award and the Guggenheim Fellowship. He was named one of the "20 under 40" writers by The New Yorker in 2010.

From 2004 through 2013 he administered the writing fellowship at the Fine Arts Work Center in Provincetown, Massachusetts. From 2013 to 2016, he taught at Wesleyan University. Since 2017, he has directed the Dorothy and Lewis B. Cullman Center for Scholars and Writers at the New York Public Library.

== Awards ==
=== Literary awards ===
Year	Work	Award	Category	Result	Ref
2008	The End	National Book Award	Fiction	Shortlisted	
2009	The End	Massachusetts Book Award	Must-Read (Longlist)	Longlisted	
2009	The End	Ohioana Book Award	Fiction	Shortlisted	
2009	The End	Young Lions Fiction Award	Fiction	Won	
2009	—	Whiting Award	Fiction	Won	
2020	The Volunteer	Ohioana Book Award	Fiction	Won	
2021	The Volunteer	Mildred and Harold Strauss Living Award	Fiction	Won	

=== Honors ===
- 2000 Fulbright Fellowship
- 2010 The New Yorker's "20 under 40: Fiction Writers to Watch"
- 2010 Guggenheim Fellowship
- 2021 Mildred and Harold Strauss Living Award

== Works ==
=== Novels ===
- —— (2008). The End. Graywolf Press. ISBN 9781555974985.
- —— (2019). The Volunteer. Penguin Books. ISBN 9780525558521.

=== Short stories ===
- —— (June 14, 2010). "The Kid". The New Yorker.
- —— (Summer 2010). "The Woman Who Lived in the House". A Public Space.
- —— (January 2013). "The Hidden Person". Harper's Magazine.
- —— (September 2015). "Tremendous Machine". Harper's Magazine.
- —— (January 21, 2019). "Do Not Stop". The New Yorker.

=== Essays ===
- —— (June 27, 2009). "Think Like a Fish". The New York Times.
- —— (June 13, 2011). "Where I Learned to Read". The New Yorker.

=== Anthologies ===
- John Kulka; John Casey; Natalie Danford, eds. (2004). Best New American Voices. Harcourt. ISBN 9780156007221.
- Bill Henderson, ed. (2004). The Pushcart Prize XXIX. W. W. Norton & Company Limited. ISBN 9781888889390.
- Laura Furman, ed. (2012). The PEN/O. Henry Prize Stories 2012. Anchor. ISBN 9780307947888.
