= Claire Vaye Watkins =

American author and academic (born 1984)

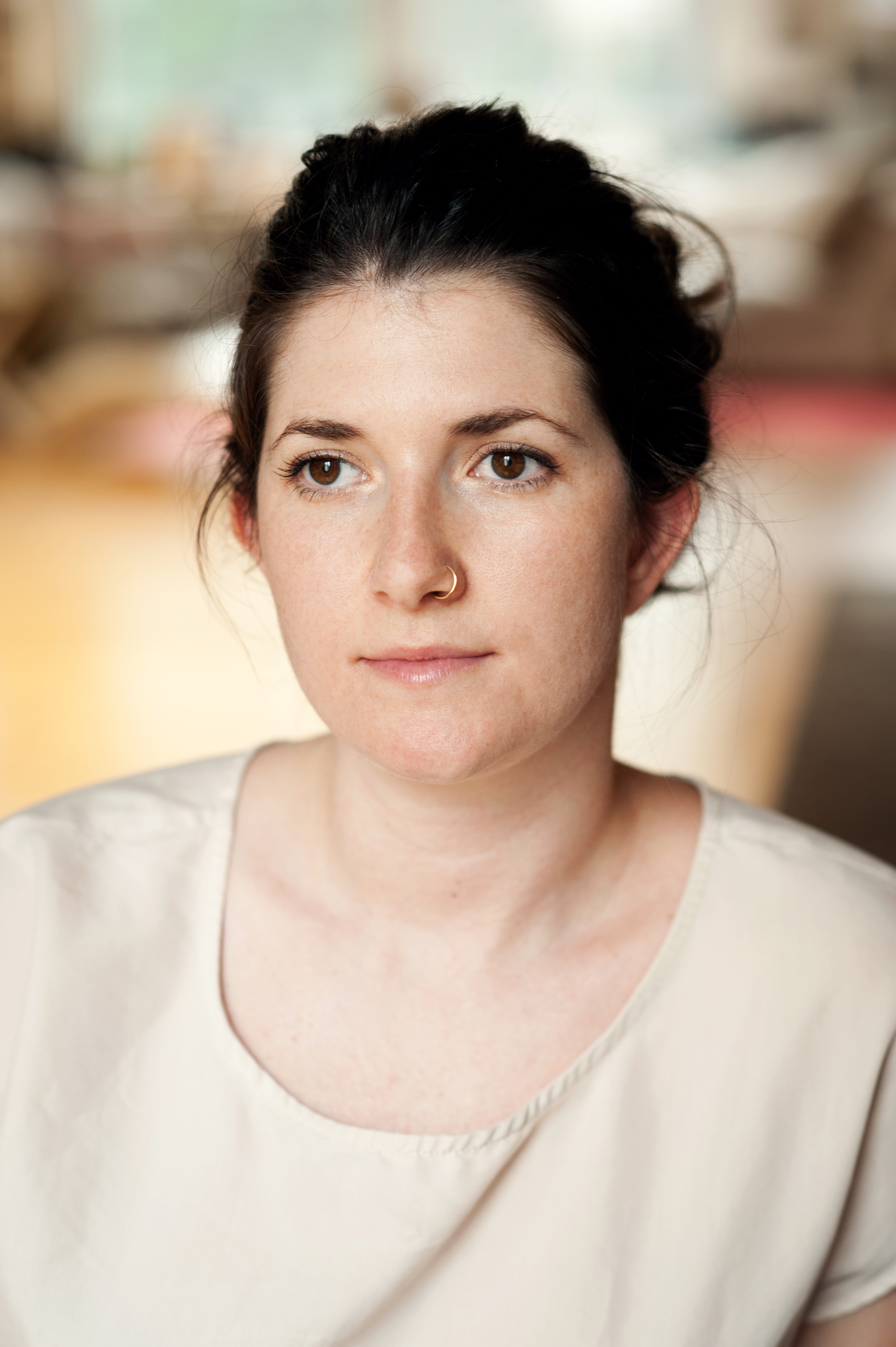
- Born: April 9, 1984 (age 42); Bishop, California, US
- Education: University of Nevada, Reno; Ohio State University
- Occupations: Novelist, short story writer, essayist, college professor
- Relatives: Paul Watkins (father); Martha Watkins (mother)
- Writing career
- Language: English
- Genres: Literary fiction, non-fiction
- Subjects: Landscape, the politics of woman and girlhood, environmental health.
- Notable works: Battleborn (2012); Gold Fame Citrus (2015); I Love You but I've Chosen Darkness (2021); Yellow Pine (2026)
- Notable awards: Guggenheim Fellowship

Claire Vaye Watkins (born April 9, 1984) is an American author and academic.

Her book of short stories Battleborn (Riverhead Books, 2012), won The Story Prize, among other awards. In 2012 the National Book Foundation named her a "5 under 35" honoree. Of her parents' influence on her award-winning collection, Watkins has said, "My father's story is more in the collective subconscious but my mom's is closer to the project." In 2014 Watkins was the recipient of the Guggenheim Fellowship.

Her debut novel, Gold Fame Citrus, was published in 2015, and her second novel, I Love You but I've Chosen Darkness, was published in 2021. Watkins currently teaches creative writing at the University of California, Irvine.

== Life ==
Claire Vaye Watkins was born in Bishop, California in 1984. She is the daughter of Martha Watkins, described by Claire as "this incredible dynamo, a great bullshitter", and Paul Watkins, a former member of the Manson Family and a close collaborator of Charles Manson. Claire Watkins was raised in the Mojave Desert, first in Tecopa, California and then across the state line in Pahrump, Nevada. She received her bachelor's degree from the University of Nevada, Reno and her Master of Fine Arts from Ohio State University where she was a Presidential fellow. Watkins is currently a faculty member at the University of California, Irvine, where she teaches creative writing. She is also on faculty at Bennington Writing Seminars, the M.F.A. program at Bennington College. Previously, she has taught as a visiting assistant professor at Princeton University, an assistant professor at Bucknell University, and an assistant professor at the University of Michigan's Helen Zell Writers' Program.

Watkins and the writer Derek Palacio, who separated in 2018 and then divorced, have a daughter named Esmé.

== Literary career ==
=== Battleborn ===
Watkins published Battleborn, a collection of short stories, in 2012 with publishing house Riverhead. The New York Times reviewed her collection as being "brutally unsentimental," writing that "Watkins's characters wish to make sense of their pain, but also to be assured that they are not alone in it." The New Yorker wrote that Watkins was within a genre entirely new: "Nevada Gothic".Battleborn won many prizes, including The Story Prize, Dylan Thomas Prize, The New York Public Library Young Lions Fiction Award, The Rosenthal Family Foundation Award from the American Academy of Arts and Letters, and The Silver Pen Award from the Nevada Writers Hall of Fame.

=== Gold Fame Citrus ===
Gold Fame Citrus, published in 2015 by Riverhead, is a surrealistic novel inspired by the Californian drought and by the lives of outcasts in the desert. It is Watkins' second book and first novel. The work received positive reviews. Slate called her debut novel, "enthralling," and The Guardian praised Watkins' ability to render landscape as extraordinary. In the New York Times Sunday Book Review, reviewer Emily St. John Mandel wrote that "[a] great pleasure of the book is Watkins's fearlessness." The book received a starred review from Publishers Weekly which said it was "packed with persuasive detail, luminous writing, and a grasp of the history (popular, political, natural, and imagined) needed to tell a story that is original yet familiar, strange yet all too believable." A finalist for the Frank O'Connor International Short Story Award and the PEN/Robert W. Bingham Prize, Watkins was also selected as one of the National Book Foundation's "5 Under 35."

=== "On Pandering" ===
Watkins critically questioned her own motives of publishing Battleborn in the 2016 Winter Issue of Tin House in her essay, "On Pandering," asserting that the book had unconsciously been written for the white male literary establishment aka the white supremacist patriarchy whose values she had internalized, and that only motherhood had delivered her from its burdensome claims. "The whole book's a pander." The essay, which observed that "misogyny is the water we swim in," appeared to critical reception and, according to the New Yorker, was "discussed heatedly for weeks, even months, thereafter." Salon's Mary Elizabeth Williams called it a "must-read essay" and Jia Tolentino of Jezebel.com called it "unusually honest," suggesting "it will be talked about for quite some time." Originally, "On Pandering" was given as a lecture during the 2015 Tin House Summer Writers' Workshop.

=== I Love You but I've Chosen Darkness ===
Watkins' second novel, I Love You but I've Chosen Darkness, was published in 2021 by Riverhead. The novel, considered a work of autofiction, was summarized in the Los Angeles Review of Books as being "...about a young mother refusing to conform to societal expectations, abandoning those who love her in search of herself." The novel is described as "fiercely committed to destroying the idea that personal mythology can be only true or false."

I Love You but I've Chosen Darkness was a 2021 finalist for the Los Angeles Times Book Prize. In their review of the work, the Los Angeles Times describes Watkins as "the most riveting voice of the unsalvageable West."

=== Yellow Pine ===
Yellow Pine, published in 2026 by Riverhead, to critical acclaim is Watkins' fourth book and third novel. Yellow Pine was named a Most Anticipated Book of the Summer by NPR, The New York Times, and the Los Angeles Times. Praised by the LA Times as "striking and vivid" "cut[ting] past narrative traditions and portray[ing] plot and emotion more directly," and the Boston Globe as “Smart, spiky … Watkins deploys incredible grace and rich humor as she populates this stark landscape with her ragtag team of characters infused with inscrutable charm.” Described as "a fresh classic of desert writing, a lament and hymn to the great Mojave, bombed, fenced, airbnb.ed and solarized to near ruin, and to its mysterious ancient and innocent heart, the desert tortoise"

== Bibliography ==
=== Fiction ===
- Battleborn (Riverhead Books, 2012; ISBN 978-1-101-59675-3)
- Gold Fame Citrus (Riverhead Books, 2015; ISBN 978-0-698-19594-3)
- I Love You but I've Chosen Darkness (Riverhead Books, 2021; ISBN 9780593330210)
- Yellow Pine (Riverhead Books, 2026; ISBN 9798217045020)

=== Essays and reporting ===
- "On pandering". Tin House. Winter 2015.
- "A trip of one's own : microdosing has brought back LSD. So why can't mothers join the fun?". The New Republic. 248 (1–2): 50–55. January–February 2017.

== Awards and honors ==
- 2012 NPR Best Short Stories of 2012
- 2012 National Book Foundation "5 Under 35"
- 2012 American Academy of Arts and Letters' Rosenthal Family Foundation Award winner Battleborn
- 2012 The Story Prize winner Battleborn
- 2012 Young Lions Fiction Award winner for Battleborn
- 2013 ALA RUSA Notable Book for Adults winner Battleborn
- 2013 Andrew Carnegie Medals for Excellence in Fiction longlist Battleborn
- 2013 Dylan Thomas Prize winner Battleborn
- 2013 Frank O'Connor International Short Story Award shortlist Battleborn
- 2013 PEN/Robert W. Bingham Prize shortlist Battleborn
- 2021 Los Angeles Times Book Prize finalist for I Love You but I've Chosen Darkness
