= The Answers (Lacey novel) =

2017 novel by Catherine Lacey

- Author: Catherine Lacey
- Language: English
- Publisher: Farrar, Straus and Giroux
- Publication date: 2017

The Answers is a 2017 novel by American writer Catherine Lacey published by Farrar, Straus and Giroux.

== Writing and publication ==
The novel emerged from a combination of two short stories. The character Kurt Sky was not inspired by a particular actor.

== Reception ==
Dwight Garner, in a review published by The New York Times, praised the novel as a book of "intellect and amplitude that deepens as it moves forward". Garner also praised the book as a worthwhile follow-up to Lacey's first novel, Nobody Is Ever Missing.

In a starred review, Kirkus Reviews said "with otherworldly precision and subtle wit, Lacey creates a gently surreal dreamscape that’s both intoxicating and profound. A singular novel; as unexpected as it is rich."

== Adaptation ==
Deadline reported in November 2022 that the novel would be adapted into a television series for channel FX. In November 2022, David Corenswet was reported tapped to star as the male lead in the pilot, with Deadline describing his character 'Christopher Skye' as a charismatic but troubled movie star involved in an enigmatic, futuristic dating experiment.
