= Olga Grushin =

American novelist

- Born: June 1971 (age 55); Moscow, Russia
- Education: Moscow State University; Emory University
- Occupation: Novelist
- Writing career
- Notable awards: Young Lions Fiction Award (2007)
- Website: www.olgagrushin.com

Olga Grushin (born June 1971) is a Russian-American novelist.

== Biography ==
Born in Moscow to the family of Boris Grushin, a prominent Soviet sociologist, Olga Grushin spent most of her childhood in Prague, Czechoslovakia. She was educated at Pushkin Museum of Fine Arts and Moscow State University before receiving a scholarship to Emory University in 1989. She graduated summa cum laude from Emory in 1993. She became a naturalized US citizen in 2002, but retains Russian citizenship. Grushin has worked as an interpreter for Jimmy Carter, as a cocktail waitress in a jazz bar, a translator at the World Bank, a research analyst at a Washington, D.C. law firm, and, most recently, an editor at Harvard University's Dumbarton Oaks Research Library and Collection.

Her first novel, The Dream Life of Sukhanov written in English, was a New York Times Notable Book of 2006, won the 2007 New York Public Library Young Lions Fiction Award, as well as a Top Ten Books of 2006 choice by The Washington Post. The novel is about an artist–turned–party official working for the communist media as an art critic named Sukhanov whose "past catches up with him during the last days of the Soviet Union", and reviewing it in the Chicago Tribune, poet Karl Kirchwey wrote:

Seldom has a first novel so perfectly captured a historical moment that seems most real because it resonates with the disaster of an individual life. There is no escape for Sukhanov, and no going back: There is none for any of us. Time sees to that.

== Novels ==
- The Dream Life of Sukhanov, New York: Putnam's Sons, 2006. ISBN 0-399-15298-9
- The Line (published in the United Kingdom as The Concert Ticket), New York: Putnam's Sons, 2010. ISBN 978-0-399-15616-8
- Forty Rooms, New York: Marian Wood Books/Putnam's Sons, 2016. ISBN 978-1101982334
- The Charmed Wife, New York: Putnam's Sons, 2021.

== Sources ==
- Contemporary Authors Online. The Gale Group, 2006. PEN (Permanent Entry Number): 0000165313.
