= Something New Under the Sun =

2021 novel by Alexandra Kleeman

- Author: Alexandra Kleeman
- Language: English
- Publisher: Hogarth Press
- Publication place: United States

Something New Under the Sun is a 2021 novel by American writer Alexandra Kleeman. The novel takes place in the near future in which California has been rendered nearly uninhabitable by climate change.

== Composition and writing ==
Kleeman wanted to include climate change in her novel in a way that was portrayed it as "[...feeling] more present and bodily". She set the novel in California, inspired by her childhood in the southern portion of the state. Kleeman deliberately wrote the opening of the book as a "realist novel" and made the story more "speculative" as it continued.
