= Lesley Nneka Arimah =

Nigerian writer (born 1983)

- Born: 13 October 1983 (age 43); London, England
- Occupation: Writer
- Writing career
- Genre: Short story
- Notable awards: 2015 Commonwealth Short Story Prize for Africa; 2017 O. Henry Prize; 2017 Kirkus Prize; 2019 Caine Prize
- Website: www.larimah.com

Lesley Nneka Arimah (born 13 October 1983 in London, United Kingdom) is a British writer. She has been described as "a skillful storyteller who can render entire relationships with just a few lines of dialogue" and "a new voice with certain staying power". She is the winner of the 2015 Commonwealth Short Story Prize for Africa, the 2017 O. Henry Prize, the 2017 Kirkus Prize, and the 2019 Caine Prize for African Writing.

== Biography ==
Arimah was born on 13 October 1983 in London. She grew up in both Nigeria and the United Kingdom, but frequently moved around due to her father being in the military. In her early teens, she moved to the United States, where she received her Master of Fine Arts degree in creative writing from Minnesota State University, Mankato in 2010.

In September 2017, the National Book Foundation honored Arimah as one of their "Five Under 35" writers to watch, and in 2019, she was a United States Artists Fellow in Writing.

Arimah currently lives in Las Vegas, Nevada, United States.

== Writing ==
=== Short stories ===
Arimah's work has appeared in The New Yorker, McSweeney's, Granta, Harper's, Per Contra, and several other publications.

=== What It Means When a Man Falls from the Sky (2017) ===
Arimah's debut collection of short stories, What It Means When a Man Falls from the Sky, was published by Riverhead Books and Tinder Press (UK) in April 2017, then republished in Nigeria by Farafina Books in November 2017.

The book centres on women protagonists exposed to a harsh environment that pushes them "to take certain steps to fit in, or make them realize, they just might not fit in", offering "a humanizing portrait of both the Nigerian citizen and first generation young female immigrant", showcasing "their flaws, their desires, their victories, and their attempts at carving out a place in a country whose customs and values diverge from that of their heritage.

The collection explores women's alienation from a number of angles, "including the fraught relationships between mothers and daughters and the complicated dynamics of female friendship". Her writing, The Atlantic observed, "conveys respect for the people who claw their way through relentlessly difficult lives." According to NPR, "It's a truly wonderful debut by a young author who seems certain to have a very bright literary future ahead of her."

The short stories also each work in harmoniously to tell the stories of Nigerian women, life, and their upbringing. The short story in particular that incorporated gender norms of girls compared to what they choose to be are specifically explored in the story "Light" in which the father and mother cannot agree on how to raise their daughter. Relating to these themes, the story "Who Will Greet You At Home" explores the struggles of motherhood, class, expectation, and empathy. The protagonist, Ogechi, tries to fabricate a child out of the materials around her. The titular short story "What it Means When a Man Falls from the Sky" explores what happens when humanity has the power to remove pain and grief through mathematical calculations. This work of science fiction was featured in the first season of the Levar Burton Reads podcast followed by an interview with the author .

This theme of dealing with grief occurs frequently in the collection, and appears in the penultimate story of the collection, entitled: "What is a Volcano". This story takes a folkloric twist, following gods and goddesses dealing with the grief that comes with losing a child. This beautiful story explores the fact that immortal beings can feel very human emotions, noting that grief is a powerful force that can overwhelm anyone, even goddesses.

These short stories explore the genre of magical realism, where a fantastical element is added to realistic fiction. In many of her stories, Arimah takes a plot that could very well just be realism and adds a magical twist. By doing this, she is able to put a new lens on important themes throughout the collection, and allow her readers to understand difficult subjects, such as grief and poverty through magical elements.

== Awards ==
Awards for Arimah's short stories
Year	Story	Award	Category	Result	Ref.
2015	"Light"	Commonwealth Short Story Prize	African Region	Won	
2016	"What It Means When a Man Falls from the Sky"	Caine Prize	—	Shortlisted	
2017	"Glory"	O. Henry Award	—	Won	
2017	"Who Will Greet You at Home?"	Caine Prize	—	Shortlisted	
2017	"Who Will Greet You at Home?"	Nommo Award	Short Story	Won: tied with “The Marriage Plot” by Tendai Huchu	
2019	"Skinned"	Caine Prize	—	Won	

Awards for What It Means When a Man Falls from the Sky
Year	Award	Category	Result	Ref.
2017	Kirkus Prize	Fiction	Won	
2018	9mobile Prize for Literature	—	Shortlisted	
2018	Aspen Words Literary Prize	—	Shortlisted	
2018	Minnesota Book Award	Fiction	Won	
2018	Young Lions Fiction Award	—	Won	

== Publications ==
- —— (2017). What It Means When a Man Falls from the Sky (hardcover 1st ed.). New York: Riverhead. ISBN 9780735211025.
