= Alex Gilvarry =

American writer

- Born: 1981 (age 44–45); New York City, U.S.
- Education: Hunter College
- Occupation: Writer
- Spouse: Alexandra Kleeman

Alex Gilvarry (b. 1981 on Staten Island, NY) is an American writer. He is the author of the novels From the Memoirs of a Non-Enemy Combatant (2012) and Eastman Was Here (2017). In 2009, Gilvarry graduated from CUNY - Hunter College's MFA Program in Creative Writing. He was included on the National Book Foundation's 5 Under 35 list in 2014, and Eastman Was Here was chosen as one of the best books of 2017 by Esquire. He is a professor of Creative Writing at Monmouth University in New Jersey. He lives on Staten Island and is married to the writer Alexandra Kleeman.

== Bibliography ==
- From the Memoirs of a Non-Enemy Combatant (2012)
- Eastman Was Here (2017)
