= Camille Bordas =

Writer and educator

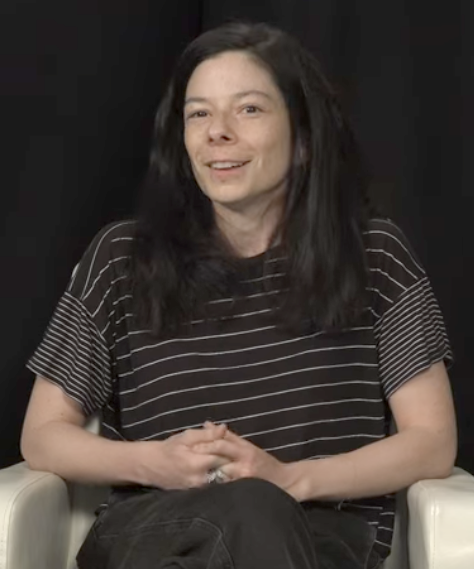
- In a 2025 video
- Born: 1987 (age 38–39); Lyon, France
- Citizenship: French, American
- Occupations: Writer, assistant professor
- Spouse: Adam Levin
- Writing career
- Language: French, English
- Notable awards: Prix du deuxième roman, Guggenheim Fellowship

Camille Bordas (born 1987) is a French and American writer and academic. Her writing has been published in The New Yorker, The Paris Review, Tin House, Chicago Magazine, and LitHub.

== Early life ==
Bordas was born in Lyon and grew up in Mexico City. Her father was an engineer who moved frequently for work, bringing the family with him. She also lived for a time in Paris and near the French Alps . She is the youngest of four children. She studied anthropology, photography, and art history.

== Career ==
Bordas published her first novel, Les treize desserts, in 2009, at the age of 22. It is a coming-of-age story about a young orphan who sets out on a journey in search of her own identity. It won the Prix Jean-Claude-Izzo and the Bourse Thyde-Monnier from the Société des gens de lettres.

Her second novel, Partie commune, was published in 2011, and tells the story of a theater director and his troupe who purchase a home with the hopes of turning it into a theater. It won the Prix du deuxième roman in 2012, and was nominated for the Prix du roman Fnac.

She began writing in English at the suggestion of her husband, Adam Levin, and found that it enabled her to distance herself from the characters. Her first novel in English, How to Behave in a Crowd, was published in 2017. It tells the story an eleven-year-old boy in a family of gifted individuals, who notices things his other family members do not. She translated the novel into French herself. It was released in France in 2019 under the title Isidore et les autres.

Her second novel in English, The Material, was released in 2024. It tells the story of one day in the life of students and faculty members in a fictional MFA program for stand-up comedy at a Chicago university. Bordas translated the novel into French herself, and it was published in France in 2025 under the title Des inconnus à qui parler.

Bordas was awarded a Guggenheim Fellowship in 2024.

In 2026, a collection of her short fiction, One Sun Only, was released.

For several years, she was an assistant professor at the University of Florida. She was the Visiting Blackburn Artist-in-Residence at Duke University for the 2025–26 academic year.

== Personal life ==
Bordas is married to writer Adam Levin, who she met at a reception for the Prix du roman Fnac. She moved to the United States in 2012. She is a fan of the football team Olympique de Marseille and the TV show The Sopranos. She lives in Chicago, and is a naturalized United States citizen.

== Bibliography ==
=== Novels ===
- —— (2009). Les treize desserts (in French). Paris: Joëlle Losfeld. ISBN 9782070787746.
- —— (2011). Partie commune (in French). Paris: Joëlle Losfeld. ISBN 9782072449307.
- —— (2017). How to Behave in a Crowd. New York: Tim Duggan Books. ISBN 9780451497543.
- —— (2024). The Material. New York: Random House. ISBN 9780593729847.

=== Short fiction ===
Collection

- —— (2026). One Sun Only. New York: Random House. ISBN 9780593729885.

Stories

Title	Year	First published	Reprinted/collected	Notes
Most Die Young	2017	"Most Die Young". The New Yorker. 2 January 2017.	One Sun Only, 2026	
The Presentation on Egypt	2019	"The presentation on Egypt". The New Yorker. Vol. 95, no. 13. 20 May 2019. pp. 68–75.	One Sun Only, 2026	
Only Orange	2019	"Only Orange". The New Yorker. 95 (41): 76–83. 23 December 2019.	One Sun Only, 2026	
The Lottery in Almería	2021	"The Lottery in Almería," The Paris Review No. 237, Summer 2021.	One Sun Only, 2026	
Offside Constantly	2021	"Offside Constantly". The New Yorker. 28 June 2021.	One Sun Only, 2026	
One Sun Only	2022	"One Sun Only". The New Yorker. 7 March 2022.	One Sun Only, 2026	
Colorín Colorado	2023	"Colorín Colorado." The New Yorker, 3 July 2023.	One Sun Only, 2026	
Understanding the Science	2025	"Understanding the Science." The New Yorker, 15 December 2025.	One Sun Only, 2026	
