= Everything Matters! =

2009 novel by Ron Currie Jr.

- Original Cover
- Author: Ron Currie Jr.
- Language: English
- Genre: Psychological fiction
- Publisher: Penguin Group
- Publication date: 2009
- Publication place: United States
- Media type: Print (hardback and paperback)
- Pages: 305 pp
- ISBN: 978-0-670-02092-8 (hardcover edition) and ISBN 978-0-14-311751-3 (paperback edition)
- Dewey Decimal: 813'.6-dc22
- LC Class: PS3603.U774E94 2009

Everything Matters! (2009) is American author Ron Currie Jr.'s second novel.

== Summary ==
The novel focuses around the life of an individual who knows from the moment of his birth exactly when and how the world will end. Guided by a seemingly omniscient presence, he struggles to understand if his actions truly matter in the face of an inevitable end. As critic Janet Maslin summarizes the novel,

The voice goes on to outline what the unborn child can expect from life. The child will learn to walk. After that, it's told, "you must learn to run, share, swing a bat and hold a pencil, love, weep, read, tie your shoelaces, bathe and die." Die? Already? How? The voice helpfully proclaims that 36 years and 168 days after the child is born a runaway comet will smash violently into planet Earth.

== Plot ==
Junior Thibodeau is born with the exact details of the end of the world by a comet and grows up with a troubled childhood, surrounded by his quiet but powerful ex-Marine father, his secretly-alcoholic and withdrawn mother, and his drug addict and later baseball-savant brother Rodney, as well as the constant presence of the voice that has stuck with him since birth. As he grows older, he questions the importance of concepts such as love in the face of the inevitable apocalypse and battles various addictions. He falls in love with a classmate named Amy and they begin a relationship, but she leaves him after he informs her of the voices in his head. Later in life, Junior becomes an avid smoker and alcoholic while his brother becomes a major baseball star. Junior and a co-worker later conspire to destroy a social security building. Junior backs out, but the friend blows up the building after giving the occupants a chance to evacuate. Junior is arrested and sent to a Bulgarian gulag. There he meets Sawyer, a government agent who reveals that the major world governments know a massive comet is approaching Earth. Sawyer offers Junior a job, which Junior accepts in exchange for his parents' financial future to be secured. Later Junior hears his father has terminal lung cancer. Working constantly for a week and almost dying, Junior develops a cure for his father and has it sent to him. Junior's father recovers, but later dies after hitting a car while asleep at the wheel. After leaving her boyfriend, Amy decides to travel to Junior's father's funeral. Mid-flight she disables the plane's smoke detector so she can indulge herself with a cigarette. A federal agent discovers what she did and arrests Amy. He reveals he is not going to arrest her and they engage in conversation. It turns out to be a ruse, and the agents locks Amy in an interrogation room. He recounts how she told him she had a relationship with a student at Stanford. The agent tells her how this student later renounced his US citizenship and became a member of the Hezbollah. Believing Amy is a part of a terrorist organization, he tortures her and cuts a pinkie off. Junior arrives and has the agent killed. He and Amy reconcile, but they decide not to leave before the comet hits. Later, Amy changes her mind and goes to sign up for Emigration, but she and many others who plan to sign up are killed by a suicide bomber. At this point, the voices in Junior's head reveal that he can pick another version of himself from another universe and take that self's place. Junior essentially goes back in time to the point where he told Amy of the voices. Instead of telling her, he instigates sex. Later in life, Junior marries Amy and develops a revolutionary irrigation system for use in third-world countries. Junior and Amy later conceive a child named Ruby. While he is very happy, Junior decides not to try to save his father this time. His father dies a painful death from lung cancer. When the comet arrives, Junior and Amy consider killing their daughter to spare her, but decide against it. Junior and his entire family flock to his bedroom and sit there as the comet hits Earth.

== Awards and honors ==
- 2010 Alex Award, American Library Association
- 2009 Amazon Best Books of the Year
