= Adam Levin =

American writer

- Born: 1976/77
- Education: University of Chicago (MA) Syracuse University (MFA)
- Occupation: Writer
- Spouse: Camille Bordas
- Writing career
- Language: English
- Years active: 2010–present
- Genre: Literary fiction

Adam Levin (born 1976/77) is an American fiction author. His short fiction has been published in places like The New Yorker, Timothy McSweeney's Quarterly Concern, and Tin House. He won the NYPL Young Lions Fiction Award in 2011, received a National Endowment for the Arts fellowship, and was a finalist for the 2010 National Jewish Book Award.

== Early life ==
Levin grew up in Buffalo Grove, Illinois, and went to high school at Roycemore School in Evanston. He attended the University of Illinois at Chicago and the University of Chicago, where he received an MA in clinical social work. He received an MFA from Syracuse University, where he studied with George Saunders.

== Career ==
Levin's first novel, The Instructions, was published in 2010 by McSweeney's. It was selected by Powell's Indispensable Book Club and The Rumpus Book Club. Some reviews drew comparisons with David Foster Wallace and Philip Roth. Some reviewers praised the dark humor, the depth of the setting, and the commentary on Jewish identity. Some reviewers criticized the book's length (more than 1000 pages), while others praised it. The Instructions was translated into French (Inculte) and published in France in 2011.

In 2012, McSweeney's published Levin's collection of short stories, Hot Pink. His second novel, Bubblegum, was released on April 14, 2020. It was followed in 2022 by his third novel, Mount Chicago.

== Personal life ==
Levin is married to writer Camille Bordas, who he met at a reception for the Prix du roman Fnac. He worked as a therapist.

== Bibliography ==
=== Novels ===
- —— (2010). The Instructions. San Francisco: McSweeney's. ISBN 9781934781821.
- —— (2020). Bubblegum. New York: Doubleday. ISBN 9780385544962.
- —— (2022). Mount Chicago. New York: Doubleday. ISBN 9780385548243.

=== Short fiction ===
- —— (2012). Hot Pink. San Francisco: McSweeney's. ISBN 9781936365210.
