= The Book of Wanderers =

2022 novel by Reyes Ramirez

- Author: Reyes Ramirez
- Language: English
- Publication place: United States

The Book of Wanderers is a 2022 short story collection by American writer Reyes Ramirez.

== Writing and publication ==
Ramirez chose to set the stories in the collection in Houston in part to "explore" the city as it "remains elusive in the American imagination".

== Accolades ==
Ramirez was nominated for the Young Lions Fiction Award for the short story collection.
