= What It Means When a Man Falls from the Sky =

Anthology by Lesley Nneka Arimah

- First edition (UK)
- Author: Lesley Nneka Arimah
- Language: English
- Genre: fantasy
- Publisher: Riverhead Books (US); Tinder Press (UK)
- Publication date: April 2017
- Publication place: Nigeria
- Media type: Print (Hardcover, Paperback), Ebook

What It Means When a Man Falls from the Sky is a collection of short stories by Nigerian writer Lesley Nneka Arimah, initially published in April 2017 by Riverhead Books and Tinder Press (UK), then republished in Nigeria by Farafina Books in November 2017.

The book won the Kirkus Prize for Fiction, the Minnesota Book Award for Fiction and the New York Public Library's Young Lions Fiction Award. In January 2018, it was shortlisted for the 9mobile Prize for Literature.

== Plot summary ==
The book centers "on female protagonists exposed to a cruel world that pushes them to take certain steps to fit in, or make them realize, they just might not fit in," offering "a humanizing portrait of both the Nigerian citizen and first generation young female immigrant", showcasing "their flaws, their desires, their victories, and their attempts at carving out a place in a country whose customs and values diverge from that of their heritage.

The short stories also each work in harmonic nature to tell the stories of Nigerian women, life, and how they are raised. The short story in particular that incorporated gender norms of what a girl is expected to be compared to what she chooses to be is specifically explored in the story “Light” in which the father and mother cannot agree on what beautiful looks like for their daughter can connect to what society views as the beauty standard for today is and how it is evolving. While the mother in this short story wants her daughter to appeal to more European standards of beauty through perming her hair her father sees that this will in fact dim her light as a person so ultimately wants her to be herself and through this she shines on her own by not living up to the normal expectations put on her as a person from her mother and the society's at large standard of beauty. The short story and title of the book “When a man falls from the Sky” has the characters' world flipped upside down as they discover an equation that they thought was perfect has flaws. While they try to reconcile with this fact, they begin to understand other people's pain as well as to learn from it. This story uses their journey of pain/grief to help us realize the same things that they did. The tale takes place in a future dystopia where climate change has flooded North America and Europe, and the citizens of those countries have become refugees and colonizers in the African continent. The other short stories found in this work are "The Future Looks Good," "War Stories," "Wild," "Second Chances," "Windfalls," "Who Will Greet You At Home," "Buchi's Girls," "Glory," "What Is A Volcano?," and "Redemption."

== Theme ==
The collection "explores women's dispossession from many angles, including the fraught relationships between mothers and daughters and the complicated dynamics of female friendship."

This theme of dealing with grief occurs frequently in the collection, and appears in the penultimate story of the collection, entitled: "What is a Volcano". This story takes a folkloric twist, following Gods and Goddesses who are dealing with the grief that comes with losing a child. This beautiful story explores the fact that immortal beings can feel very human emotions, noting that grief is a powerful force that can overwhelm anyone, even Goddesses.

These short stories explore the genre of magical realism, where a fantastical element is added to realistic fiction. In many of her stories, Arimah takes a plot that could very well just be realism, and adds a magical twist. By doing this, Arimah is able to put a new lens on important themes throughout the collection, and allow her readers to understand difficult subjects, such as grief and poverty through magical elements.

== Reception ==
Before publication, What it Means was named one of the most anticipated books of 2017 by BuzzFeed, The Boston Globe, the Chicago Tribune, Electric Literature, The Millions, the Minneapolis Star-Tribune, Nylon, and TIME.

According to The Atlantic, the collection, "conveys respect for the people who claw their way through relentlessly difficult lives." NPR praised the collection, saying, "It's a truly wonderful debut by a young author who seems certain to have a very bright literary future ahead of her."

=== Awards ===
Awards for What It Means When a Man Falls from the Sky
Year	Award	Result
2017	Kirkus Prize for Fiction	Won
	National Book Foundation "5 Under 35"	Honoree
	National Book Critics Circle Award John Leonard Prize	Finalist
2018	9mobile Prize for Literature	Shortlisted
2018	Aspen Words Literary Prize	Shortlisted
2018	Minnesota Book Award for Fiction	Won
2018	New York Public Library Young Lions Fiction Award	Won
