= Ellen Meloy =

American nature writer

- Born: June 21, 1946; Pasadena, California, U.S.
- Died: November 4, 2004 (aged 58); Bluff, Utah, U.S.
- Education: Goucher College (BFA); University of Montana (MA)
- Occupation: Environmental Writer
- Relatives: Colin Meloy (nephew); Maile Meloy (niece)

Ellen Meloy (June 21, 1946, Pasadena, California – November 4, 2004, Bluff, Utah) was an American nature writer.

== Life ==
She was born Ellen Louise Ditzler in Pasadena, California. She graduated from Goucher College with a degree in art, and from the University of Montana with a master's degree in environmental studies. She married her husband Mark Meloy, a river ranger, in 1985. Her nephew is the musician and writer Colin Meloy and her niece is the writer Maile Meloy.

A prize bearing Meloy's name is presented annually by The Ellen Meloy Fund for Desert Writers.

== Awards ==
- 1997 Whiting Award
- 2003 Pulitzer Prize nomination for The Anthropology of Turquoise Meditations on Landscape, Art & Spirit (2003)
- 2007 John Burroughs Medal Award

== Selected works ==
- "GROUND ZERO". Salon. February 24, 1999. Archived from the original on February 13, 2010.
- Meloy, Ellen (1994). Raven's Exile: A Season on the Green River. H. Holt. ISBN 978-0-8050-2497-5.
- —— (2001). The Last Cheater's Waltz: Beauty and Violence in the Desert Southwest. University of Arizona Press. ISBN 978-0-8165-2153-1.
- —— (2002). The anthropology of turquoise: meditations on landscape, art, and spirit. Pantheon Books. ISBN 978-0-375-40885-4.
- —— (2005). Eating Stone: Imagination and the Loss of the Wild. Pantheon Books. ISBN 978-0-375-42216-4.
- Hunter, Christopher J. (1991). Tom Palmer (ed.). Better trout habitat: a guide to stream restoration and management. Illustrated by ––. Island Press. ISBN 978-0-933280-77-9. "Ellen Meloy."
- —— (2004). Foreword. Sandstone seduction: rivers and lovers, canyons and friends. By Lee, Katie. Big Earth Publishing. ISBN 978-1-55566-338-4.

=== Anthologies ===
- Bill McKibben, ed. (2008). American Earth: environmental writing since Thoreau. Literary Classics of the United States. ISBN 978-1-59853-020-9.
- —— (2007). "Think not of a Tectonic Plate but of a Sumptuous Feast". In Susan Wittig Albert; Susan Hanson (eds.). What wildness is this: women write about the Southwest. University of Texas Press. ISBN 978-0-292-71630-8.
- William Kittredge; John Smart, eds. (1988). Montana spaces: essays and photographs in celebration of Montana. Photography by John Smart. Nick Lyons Books. ISBN 978-1-55821-000-4.
- American Nature Writing: 2000, the volume was devoted to emerging women writers and was edited by John A. Murray, published by Oregon State University Press: Corvallis.
