= Bubblegum (novel) =

2020 science fiction novel by Adam Levin

- First U.S. edition cover
- Author: Adam Levin
- Language: English
- Genre: Science fiction
- Publisher: Doubleday
- Publication date: April 14, 2020
- Publication place: United States
- Media type: Print (hardcover), e-book, audiobook
- Pages: 784
- ISBN: 978-0-385-54496-2 (hardcover)
- OCLC: 1083180693
- Dewey Decimal: 813/.6
- LC Class: PS3612.E92365 B83 2020

Bubblegum is a 2020 science fiction novel by Adam Levin. The novel takes place in Illinois, though in a reality where "curios" — flesh-based robots — are common, and the internet does not exist.

== Background ==
Levin spent approximately a decade writing the novel. Originally, Levin wrote a short story featuring the protagonist of Bubblegum, Belt Magnet, which he has referred to as "terrible". The story was not published, and Levin later combined some of its elements with an instruction manual for the in-universe curios featured in Bubblegum, producing the earliest versions of the book.

== Plot ==
The novel is a first-person narrative told by the protagonist, Belt Magnet, or "Billy." It begins in the 1980s with Belt's childhood memories of growing up near Chicago and developing friendships in school using derogatory family phrases to defend one's honor or to get a laugh. One of Belt's phrases become a hit among the kids in school because of Jonboat, a new blonde-haired rich kid in town. The two decide to make t-shirts and have a detailed discussion of what the shirts should look like - arguing down to the specific grammar on the shirt. This in-depth grammatical discussion is an example of Belt's mental process during his life.

As an adult, Belt still lives with and depends on his father, Clyde. He smokes a large number of cigarettes daily and justifies this as a memorial to his deceased mother who smoked. After his mother's death, Belt wrote a book called No Please Don’t which was not a big hit but is mentioned many times throughout the novel. Belt is always pleasantly surprised when he finds out people have appreciated his work, even if not in the way he intended. Much of Belt's thoughts focus on meditations around family, friendship, and intimate relationships.

Belt believes he can (and possibly actually can) communicate with inanimate objects, called "inans," and as a young teen helps several local swing sets "end their suffering" by bashing them with a baseball bat. No one presses charges after Belt agrees never to do it again and he promises his mother he will not destroy other people's property, even with that property's permission.

Shortly after the last swing set murder, Belt's mother begins having issues due to the tumor growing in her brain and Belt is selected to be among the first people given a new type of pet aimed at helping people with mental health issues.

These pets, called a "Botimal" or "Curio" are a newly engineered flesh-and-bone "robot" that fits in your hand and purports to help people cope with issues like depression. "Cures," as they are eventually called, can dance, do tricks, mimic sounds, are exceedingly cute, and can even clone themselves. Most people believe they are not sentient creatures and Belt develops a significant attachment to his Curio, which he names Blank. There are times when Belt chooses to show off Blank and other times when he refuses to let anyone see it.

Curios become very popular and a huge industry emerges, selling supplies, habitats, and eventually supplemental drugs that can change or enhance the curios or their clones. It seems that everyone owns one or more curios and older ones are worth more money because they keep getting cuter and cuter as they age. Very few live more than a few years, though, since most people view curios as a non-sentient being, and have no qualms in "overloading" on their curios, which is killing them and enjoying the "pain-song" they sing as they die. Belt's curio Blank eventually becomes the oldest living curio in the world but Belt does not allow anyone to know this.

In 2013 (present day), Jonboat has become a billionaire astronaut married to Fondajane Henry, one of the most beautiful people in the world, and his 15-year old son "Triple J" experiments with new and innovative ways to kill and injure curios. Triple J has created a video collage of clips showing Curios being experimented on, tortured, and changed to make them even cuter or to do new things. He accidentally beats up Belt before learning that Belt is the author of his favorite book, and the childhood friend of his father. He reaches out to apologize and later asks Belt to write the transcript of his video collage, which he claims will be a major new work of art when it is presented to the world. Belt is given a video copy of the collage, but he does not watch all the way to the end, which includes video footage from the initial trial he participated in with other children, including a girl named Lissette.

Belt is invited to brunch with Jonboat's family to give feedback on the video collage. Belt's father provides a gift for Belt to give to Jonboat when they meet again: one of the old t-shirts that Jonboat created using Belt's catchphrase. Belt finally hugs his father for the first time in twenty years. After this, Belt tries to watch more of the video collage with his father, but his father leaves and remarks that this sort of video isn't for him. Belt shares the same sentiment but must keep watching to enable his critique. He eventually skips through several clips to get a general idea and hurries off to the brunch.

Belt, Triple J, and Fondajane watch the rest of Trip's collage. When they get to the end, and Belt sees the footage that includes Belt with the other children, Belt runs out of the room to calm himself. He then overhears Triple J being confused about Belt's feelings. Triple J mentions to Fondajane that the last clip was of Belt when he was younger and full of pain but Triple J does not understanding Belt's reaction and Fondajane becoming angry at Trip's ignorance.

Jonboat arrives, and Belt gets to hear about his astronaut adventures and they catch up. We learn that Jonboat was able to explore space but he refuses to provide further information. Belt gets to wear Jonboat's space helmet, but the helmet begs Belt to kill it because it wishes to be in space and not stuck on a shelf in an office. Jonboat writes Belt a check for one hundred thousand dollars for the transcription work he will do for Triple J.

Belt leaves and goes to a tavern, where he tells his father about the exchange and the check he has received. Belt talks to a man named Herb, a private investigator and he hires Herb to try and find Lisette, the girl he knew from the pet therapy trial years ago, along with another girl he knew in Middle School.

Belt finishes writing the transcript for Triple J quickly because he does not enjoy watching the clips. Everything about the clips disgusts him. Belt argues with himself for accepting money at the cost of his morality but continues the work. To calm himself after each day’s viewing, Belt plays games with Blank. But after a while, Belt struggles with the urge to overload on Blank and these thoughts force Belt to limit his contact with his Curio in order to keep it safe.

After finishing the transcript, Belt goes shopping for a gift for Blank. The clerk suggests an “Executioner’s Set,” and Belt clarifies he doesn’t want a toy that’ll harm or kill his Curio. The clerk informs Belt that those items haven’t been sold in years and generally aren’t available. He suggests that Belt buy a sword set and cover the sword with something blunt, like bubblegum. The clerk informs Belt of the latest trend with Curios, AOL (Auto-Overload), in which the Curio is given a drug mixture and a mirror which causes it to commit suicide. Belt is very bothered by the idea and sees several video example of this latest trend.

Belt gifts Blank a new nest, celebrates his achievements with a drink, and plays with the curio, but realizes it is sneezing green goo and rushes it to a vet. The vet informs him Blank has cancer which has probably been caused by Belt's long history of smoking. Belt asks why Blank isn't pain singing, since it must be in pain and the vet clarifies that curios don't pain-sing, they fear-sing. The vet leaves the room, and Belt stands grieving for Blank as the curio rests itself on his shoulder and communicates to Belt that it wants him to kill it. After some time, Belt tilts his head and ends Blank’s suffering.

Clyde is injured at work and retires early. He receives a settlement that pays for all medical expenses and several years' worth of work. Clyde chooses to take a trip to Europe and sends postcards to Belt explaining his adventures including meeting the author of the book, Adam Levin.

Belt delivers the transcript. Jonboat's right hand man informs Belt that Triple J's big screening of the video collage has been canceled because of the release of new AOL-related clips, which obviates Trip’s attempts to innovate new ways of torturing curios.

Herb informs Belt he has found Lisette through one of the doctors that was in charge of their study years before. The doctor tells Belt that Lisette tried repeatedly to contact Belt immediately after he left the study due to his mother's death. Belt learns Lisette lives at the Costello House, a halfway house for recovering drug addicts, which is close by.

Lissette and Belt meet at a McDonald's, but they introduce themselves using different names. They talk about the bubblegum stains on the ground. Lisette describes them as “pavement melanomas”. Lisette mentions she’s excited to meet her old friend Belt and explains their connection and how she wishes to apologize to him. Belt assures her she is forgiven. Lisette goes into the McDonalds to "look for Belt," then sits in a booth and takes out a curio and begins playing with it. She waves at Belt, and Belt nods and waves back.

== Curios ==
One of the primary concepts in this novel is that of "curios," friendly flesh-and-bone robots that are very common, comparable to modern-day iPhones. Belt is given a curio named Blank, which is hatched from a marble, smells like bubblegum, and is smart, cute, and requires body heat (or cuddles) to survive. These curios, or "cures" for short, are very cute and live to connect with their masters and amuse them. Many people become obsessed with cures and see them as disposable pets, and often abuse them for their satisfaction in demented ways. Levin introduces the concept of the owner "overloading," meaning the master is so insanely obsessed with the cure and its cuteness that they go as far as to murder it or squeeze it to death. Curios get cuter as they age, so a new curio is not as cute as one that is a year old. Most curios live up to a year or two before their master overloads and kills it, but Belt Magnet's cure is over twenty years old. Others often torture their curios, which causes them to sing in pain, which is pleasurable to most people. Some have critiqued the novel for sickening scenes such as these, while some admire the imagination and dark humor required to create such a unique and baffling concept.

== Themes and literary elements ==
=== Theme ===
Bubblegum is a dark yet comedic novel with the recurring theme of suffering. Belt suffers from neglect, as his father continually leaves him for days without contacting Belt or leaving him money. His mother eventually dies from a cancerous tumor in her brain, leaving the father alone to raise Belt. At a young age, Belt also hears inanimate objects suffering and tries to put them out of their misery. Throughout a large portion of the novel, these curios that can feel pain live a life of misery inflicted upon them by humans. The novel reminds us that no matter what environment surrounds humankind, there will always be people who cause suffering for their gain. Besides the pain of losing his mother, growing up in a single-parent household, and having a psychological disorder, Belt also struggles to fend for himself and still lives with his father at age 38. Social interaction is very painful for him, and he continues to struggle to do things himself. The primary sources of suffering that the reader observes in the novel are either from Belt's negative inner thoughts or the curios receiving abuse from their owners.

=== Metaphor ===
The metaphor found within the text of comparing the internet to curios is very prevalent. The Internet does not exist in the world of Belt Magnet, as the obvious substitute are the curios. These curios are addicting, and nearly everyone is using them by the end of the novel. They can be used for good and as a comforting pet, but they can also be abused. It shares similarities with the internet; after being popularized, people quickly found a way to abuse it for morally wrong purposes. The internet can help people communicate, entertain people, and create jobs, but it can also create mass hysteria, help traffic innocents, and scam people for their money. No matter the phenomenon, whether it be curios, the internet, or anything else, people can always twist it and distort it.
