= Maile Meloy =

American fiction writer (born 1972)

- Born: February 15, 1972 (age 54); Helena, Montana, U.S.
- Education: Harvard College; University of California, Irvine (MFA)
- Relatives: Colin Meloy (brother); Carson Ellis (sister-in-law); Ellen Meloy (aunt)
- Writing career
- Genre: Fiction
- Notable awards: Guggenheim Fellowship (2004)

Maile Meloy (born January 1, 1972) is an American novelist and short story writer.

== Early life and education ==
Born and raised in Helena, Montana, Meloy received a bachelor's degree from Harvard College in 1994 and an MFA from the University of California, Irvine.

== Career ==
Meloy won The Paris Review's Aga Khan Prize for Fiction for her story "Aqua Boulevard" in 2001; the PEN/Malamud Award for her first collection of short stories, Half in Love, in 2003; and a Guggenheim Fellowship in 2004. In 2007, Granta included her on its list of the 21 "Best Young American Novelists."

Her work has appeared in The New Yorker, and she is a frequent contributor to The New York Times.

Describing how she wrote Half in Love, Meloy is quoted on the Ploughshares web site as saying, "What I wound up with was a book that was set in different decades, partly in Montana—and those stories were some of the hardest to write, because it's the place I’m closest to—and partly in other places, in London and Paris and Greece. So it had very little temporal or geographical unity, but the characters are all caught between one thing and another, half in love with something or someone, when life deals them something they didn’t expect."

In 2015, two stories from Meloy's collection Half in Love ("Tome" and "Native Sandstone") and one story from Both Ways Is the Only Way I Want It ("Travis, B.") were adapted into the movie Certain Women directed by Kelly Reichardt. It premiered at the Sundance Film Festival in January 2016 and was released by IFC Films in October 2016. A story from the book was also featured on This American Life's 2016 Christmas episode, read aloud by Meloy.

Meloy served on the writing staff of the Netflix series The Society, which premiered in 2019.

== Personal life ==
Meloy is the older sister of Colin Meloy, frontman of The Decemberists, solo artist, and author of The Wildwood Chronicles novels. Their aunt, the late Ellen Meloy, was also an author.

She lives in Los Angeles.

== Works ==
- Half in Love: Stories (2002)
- Liars and Saints (2003)
- A Family Daughter (2006)
- Both Ways Is the Only Way I Want It: Stories (2009)
- The Apothecary Series
  - The Apothecary (2011)
  - The Apprentices (2013)
  - The After-Room (2015)
- Do not become alarmed (2017)

=== Short fiction ===
- "Demeter". The New Yorker. Vol. 88, no. 36. November 19, 2012.
- "The Proxy Marriage". The New Yorker. May 21, 2012.
- "Travis, B." The New Yorker. Vol. 78, no. 4003. October 20, 2002.
