= Xuan Juliana Wang =

Chinese American author

Xuan Juliana Wang is a Chinese American writer. She teaches creative writing at the University of California, Los Angeles. Her 2019 short story collection, Home Remedies, won the John C. Zacharis First Book Award and was shortlisted for the Young Lions Fiction Award and the 2020 PEN/Robert W. Bingham Prize. She earned her MFA from Columbia University and received a Stegner Fellowship to study at Stanford University.

== Early life and education ==
Xuan Juliana Wang was born in 1985 Heilongjiang, China. Her family moved to Los Angeles when she was seven years old.

Wang earned her BA from the University of Southern California. She earned her MFA from Columbia University in 2011 and received a Stegner Fellowship to study at Stanford University from 2011 to 2013. She lived in Beijing for two and a half years in her 20s. During the 2008 Summer Olympics she worked as a translator.

== Career ==
Wang's work has been published in the Pushcart Prize Anthology, The Atlantic, Ploughshares, and The Best American Nonrequired Reading. Her debut work was the 2019 short story collection Home Remedies. The collection was shortlisted for the Young Lions Fiction Award and the 2020 PEN/Robert W. Bingham Prize. It won the John C. Zacharis First Book Award.

Wang is a professor at the University of California, Los Angeles and teaches creative writing. She has been a fiction editor at Fence magazine.
