= Tom Lin (writer) =

American novelist

Tom Wentao Lin (born c. 1996) is an American novelist. His debut novel, The Thousand Crimes of Ming Tsu, a Western about a Chinese American outlaw, was published by Little, Brown and Company in 2021 and won the 2022 Andrew Carnegie Medal for Excellence in Fiction.

== Early life and education ==
Lin was born in Beijing, China, and moved to Flushing, Queens, New York City with his family when he was four. He attended Pomona College. As of 2021, he is pursuing a doctorate in English at the University of California, Davis.

== Career ==
Lin's debut novel, The Thousand Crimes of Ming Tsu, was published by Little, Brown and Company on June 1, 2021. It is a Western with supernatural elements set in the 1860s about a Chinese American assassin who pursues vengeance after railroad barons kidnap his lover and conscript him into helping construct the Central Pacific Railroad. Media praised the story's subversion of the white-centric perspective of traditional westerns and its exploration of identity. The novel was awarded the 2022 Andrew Carnegie Medal for Excellence in Fiction, making Lin the youngest Carnegie winner.

Lin's second novel, Babylon, South Dakota, was published by Little, Brown and Company on May 26, 2026. The novel blends the Western with Magical Realism and Science Fiction to tell the story of the Hsiu family, who inherit a farm in South Dakota, one acre of which is purchased by the US Army for use as a Nuclear missile silo.

== Works ==
- The Thousand Crimes of Ming Tsu. Little, Brown and Company. June 1, 2021. ISBN 978-0-316-54217-3.
- Babylon, South Dakota. Little, Brown and Company. May 26, 2026. ISBN 978-0-316-57627-7.
