= God Is Dead (novel) =

2007 novel by Ron Currie Jr.

- Author: Ron Currie Jr.
- Publisher: Viking Press
- Publication date: July 9, 2007
- Pages: 182
- ISBN: 978-0-670-03867-1

God is Dead (2007) is the debut novel of American author Ron Currie Jr. The book is a collection of related shorter stories about a world where God has come to earth and died.

== Plot ==
The book begins in Sudan, where God, disguised as a Dinka woman, attempts to help out around a refugee camp. She speaks with the American diplomats visiting the camp, including former Secretary of State Colin Powell, about finding the missing brother of the body she inhabits. While she is there, the camp is attacked by the Sudanese government, killing everyone, including God. The rest of the book focuses on how things unravel after God's death. A high school graduate watches in horror as a priest commits suicide. Soon after, a group of childhood friends form a suicide pact after all their relatives die in the chaos. People later begin to worship their children in the absence of religion, while the psychiatrists tasked to disrupt such unproductive behavior are the most hated people alive. The dogs who ate God's corpse are revealed to possess a higher knowledge, but this brings only death to all but one of them. The book closes with a view into war in this Godless world, where religious wars have been replaced by ideological wars between supporters of evolutionary psychology versus postmodernism.

== Reception ==
In The Believer, Andrew Ervin called God is Dead "an extraordinary book", while Kirkus Reviews referred to it as "very clever indeed" and compared it to the works of Kurt Vonnegut and Louis-Ferdinand Céline. Ervin described the chapter "My Brother the Murderer" as "beautiful and profound," calling it the book's "obvious highlight."

Publishers Weekly highlighted how "looking at humanity through a warped lens allows the various narrators unusual insight; while sometimes overwrought, these observations are often striking". They concluded that "this novel-in-stories is unsettling and strange, but still easily accessible; despite the ways in which his world has changed, Currie's altered humanity has one foot in ours".
