= You Too Can Have a Body Like Mine =

2015 novel by Alexandra Kleeman

- First edition
- Author: Alexandra Kleeman
- Language: English
- Genre: Literary fiction
- Publisher: HarperCollins
- Publication date: 2015
- Publication place: United States
- Media type: Print (hardback & paperback)
- ISBN: 9780062388674

You Too Can Have a Body Like Mine is the 2015 debut novel by Alexandra Kleeman. It was Kleeman's first novel, and was published by HarperCollins. It was longlisted for the Center for Fiction First Novel Prize, shortlisted for the NBCC Leonard Prize, and won the 2016 Bard Fiction Prize.

== Plot summary ==
The novel concerns a woman, who is unnamed, and her roommate, B, and boyfriend, C.
