= Alexandra Kleeman =

American writer

- Born: 1986 (age 39–40); Berkeley, California, U.S.
- Education: Brown University (BA); Columbia University (MFA)
- Occupations: Author, writer
- Writing career
- Genres: Fiction, short story
- Notable work: You Too Can Have a Body Like Mine (2015)
- Notable awards: The Bard Fiction Prize (2016)

Alexandra Kleeman (born 1986) is an American writer. Winner of the 2020 Rome Prize, her work has been reviewed in The New York Times, The Guardian, Vanity Fair, Vogue, and the Los Angeles Review of Books.

== Early life and education ==
Kleeman was born in Berkeley, California, in 1986 to an American professor of religious studies and a Taiwanese-born professor of Japanese literature. She grew up in Japan and Colorado. Her first language is Japanese. Kleeman studied creative writing and cognitive science at Brown University, and received an MFA from Columbia University in 2012.

== Career ==
In 2010 Kleeman's short story "Fairy Tale" was published in The Paris Review while she was in her first semester of her MFA program. In 2015 her first novel You Too Can Have a Body Like Mine was published. You Too Can Have a Body Like Mine was longlisted for both the New York Book Critics Circle John Leonard Prize and Center for Fiction First Novel Prize. Her short story collection Intimations was published in 2016. Kleeman was the recipient of the 2016 Bard Fiction Prize for promising writers under the age of 40. In August 2021, Hogarth published Kleeman's novel Something New Under the Sun.

Kleeman teaches writing at The New School in New York. She previously taught at Columbia University School of the Arts. She has written for The New Yorker, Paris Review, Harper's, Vogue, Zoetrope, New York Times Magazine, and n+1, among others.

== Personal life ==
Kleeman is married to writer Alex Gilvarry and lives in Staten Island.

== Bibliography ==
- You Too Can Have a Body Like Mine, Harper, 2015, ISBN 9780062388674
- Intimations: Stories, Harper, 2016, ISBN 9780062388704
- Something New Under the Sun 2021
