= Battleborn (book) =

2012 short story collection by Claire Vaye Watkins

- First edition (US)
- Author: Claire Vaye Watkins
- Language: English
- Genre: Literary fiction
- Publisher: Riverhead Books (US); Granta Books (UK)
- Publication date: August 2, 2012
- Publication place: United States
- Media type: Print (hardcover & paperback)
- ISBN: 9781594631450
- OCLC: 761846638

Battleborn (2012) is a short story collection by American author Claire Vaye Watkins.

== Contents ==
Story	Originally published in
"Ghosts, Cowboys"	The Hopkins Review
"The Last Thing We Need"	Granta
"Rondine Al Nido"	The Chicago Tribune Printers Row
"The Past Perfect, the Past Continuous, the Simple Past"	The Paris Review
"Wish You Were Here"	The Sycamore Review
"Man-O-War"	One Story
"The Archivist"	Glimmer Train
"The Diggings"	
"Virginia City"	Las Vegas City Life
"Graceland"	Hobart

== Synopsis ==
=== "Ghosts, Cowboys" ===
A semi-autobiographical narrator tells the story of her father Paul Watkins and his role in the Manson Family.

Additionally, the story details how George Spahn acquired his ranch and the narrator's bond with her half-sister dubbed Razor Blade Baby.

== Awards and honors ==
- 2012 American Academy of Arts and Letters' Rosenthal Family Foundation Award winner
- 2012 The Story Prize winner
- 2012 Young Lions Fiction Award winner
- 2013 ALA RUSA Notable Book for Adults winner
- 2013 Andrew Carnegie Medals for Excellence in Fiction longlist
- 2013 Dylan Thomas Prize winner
- 2013 Frank O'Connor International Short Story Award shortlist
- 2013 PEN/Robert W. Bingham Prize shortlist

== Bibliography ==
- Claire Vaye Watkins (2 August 2012). Battleborn: Stories. Penguin Publishing Group. ISBN 978-1-101-59675-3.
