= Yahdon Israel =

American writer and editor

- Occupations: book and magazine editor
- Organizations: Brooklyn Magazine; Simon & Schuster; CUNY; National Book Critics Circle; Aspen Words Literary Prize
- Website: http://www.yahdonisrael.com/

Yahdon Israel is an American book and magazine editor. He is a senior editor at Simon & Schuster and a former editor-in-chief of the Brooklyn Magazine. He hosts the Brooklyn-based book club Literary Swag and has served on the board of the National Book Critics Circle.

== Career ==
Israel was born to a religious Jewish family in Brooklyn, New York. A graduate of The New School, Israel has regularly published photographs of stylishly dressed book readers on his Instagram account. This led to the creation of what he called the Literary Swag movement, which he has described as an "intersection of fashion and literature", as well as a monthly book club of the same name. He has worked as an instructor at CUNY's master of fine arts program and at the New York City College.

He later became the editor-in-chief of the Brooklyn Magazine, and in March 2021 began working as a senior editor of Simon & Schuster. He has served at the selection committee of the Aspen Words Literary Prize.
