= Nobody Is Ever Missing (novel) =

2014 novel by Catherine Lacey

- Author: Catherine Lacey
- Language: English
- Publisher: Farrar, Straus and Giroux
- Publication date: 2014

Nobody Is Ever Missing is a 2014 debut novel by American writer Catherine Lacey published by Farrar, Straus and Giroux.

== Writing and publication ==
While working toward an MFA in non-fiction writing from Columbia University, Lacey worked on a book for four years, which she eventually abandoned. After she stopped working on that book, she began working on short stories; she eventually turned these into Nobody Is Ever Missing. Lacey had a breakthrough in writing from the point of view of the narrator and central character, Elyria, while writing a specific scene in which she was "narrating a letter to her husband".

The book's title comes from the John Berryman poem "Dream Song 29", published in Berryman's collection The Dream Songs.

== Reception ==
In his review of Lacey's second novel, The Answers, Dwight Garner praised Nobody Is Ever Missing. Garner wrote that strong debut novels make him wary of an author's ability to produce a sophomore work of similar quality but he ultimately found his worries about the quality of The Answers unfounded.

In a review for The Guardian the novel was praised as "wry, surprising, and blackly funny." With the reviewer noting, "Lacey has produced a novel of uncomfortable power."
