= Liars and Saints =

2003 novel by Maile Meloy

- First edition (publ. Scribner)
- Author: Maile Meloy
- Language: English
- Genre: Literary fiction
- Publisher: Scribner
- Publication date: August 1, 2003
- Publication place: USA
- Pages: 272
- ISBN: 0-7432-4435-4

Liars and Saints is a novel by American author Maile Meloy, published in 2003 by Scribner. Meloy's debut novel, it was shortlisted for the 2005 Women's Prize for Fiction.

== Summary ==
The novel follows the story of a family over the course of around 50 years. Key events include teenage pregnancy and the murder of one family member.

== Reception ==
Liars and Saints received positive reviews. The Independent praised the book's "refreshingly conservative" narrative structure.

Kirkus Reviews said the story of Liars and Saints was told "with remarkable compression and precision."

The New Yorker spoke positively of the novel, saying the reader would be likely to wish it were longer.

Booklist also reviewed the novel.

== Awards ==
Liars and Saints was shortlisted for the Women's Prize for Fiction in 2005.
