= Idwal =

Idwal is Welsh for "lord of the wall". As a masculine given name, it may refer to the following people:

== Middle Ages ==
Ordered chronologically

- Idwal Iwrch (reigned c. 655–682), King of Gwynedd
- Idwal or Ithel ap Morgan, 8th century King of Gwent and Glywysing
- Idwal Foel (died c. 942), King of Gwynedd
- Idwal ab Idwal, better known as Ieuaf (ruled 950–969), joint king of Gwynedd (with his father Idwal Foel) and possibly Powys
- Idwal ap Meurig (died 997), King of Gwynedd

== Modern world ==
Ordered alphabetically

- Idwal Davies (footballer) (1899–1980), Welsh footballer
- Idwal Davies (rugby) (1915–1990), Welsh dual-code rugby player
- Idwal H. Edwards (1895–1981), United States Air Force lieutenant general
- Idwal Fisher (1935–2012), Welsh rugby union and rugby league footballer
- Idwal Jones (writer) (1887–1964), novelist and non-fiction writer
- Idwal Jones (novelist) (1887–1964), Welsh-American novelist and non-fiction writer
- Idwal Jones (politician) (1900–1982), Welsh politician
- Idwal Jones (writer) (1895–1937), Welsh schoolmaster, poet and dramatist
- Idwal Pugh (1918–2010), Welsh civil servant
- Idwal Rees (1910–1991), Welsh international rugby union centre
- Idwal Robling (1927–2011), Welsh sports commentator
