= When We Were Sisters =

2022 novel by Fatimah Asghar

- Author: Fatimah Asghar
- Language: English
- Publisher: One World
- Publication date: 2022
- Publication place: United States

When We Were Sisters is a 2022 novel by American writer Fatimah Asghar. The novel follows the lives of three orphaned sisters sent to live with their uncle after their father's death.

== Writing and publication ==
Asghar wrote the novel during a "period of extreme rejection". Before the novel, Asghar had not written fiction, and described writing the book as "one of the hardest artistic endeavors I've ever done". Krista Franklin encouraged Asghar to "write the book however it was coming" while working.

Asghar was inspired by Justin Torres' novel We the Animals.

== Reception and accolades ==
=== Critical reception ===
In a positive review published by Chicago Review of Books, Mary Retta praised Asghar's writing as "lyric, gentle, and fierce". Retta compared the book's content to Asghar's web series Brown Girls, writing that like it, "the novel is committed to an honest portrayal of the lives of queer women of color". Writing for Booklist, Allison Cho also praised Asghar's prose, saying that the novel contains "that same lyricism from her poetry collection". In a review for the New York Times, Nicole Flattery praised Asghar's writing as "distinctive", but wrote that it "serves to mask commonplace observations" and was occasionally unclear.

=== Accolades ===
Asghar was nominated for the 2023 Young Lions Fiction Award for the novel, which was ultimately won by Zain Khalid's Brother Alive. The book won the inaugural Carol Shields Prize for Fiction in 2023.
