= Idwal Jones =

Idwal Jones may refer to:

- Idwal Jones (novelist) (1887–1964), novelist and non-fiction writer
- Idwal Jones (writer) (1895–1937), Welsh schoolmaster, poet and dramatist
- Idwal Jones (politician) (1900–1982), Welsh politician
