= Jan Gay =

German-American author, activist, and researcher (1902–1960)

Jan Gay (born Helen Reitman, 1902–1960) was a German-born American journalist, author, activist, and researcher.

She is known for her pioneering research on the realities of gays and lesbians in 1930s Europe and the US, conducted as part of the Committee for the Study of Sex Variants. Previously, she had visited Magnus Hirschfeld's Institute for Sexual Science.

Gay was also a relevant early figure of nudism in the US, a topic on which she wrote the essay On Going Naked (1932) and the script of the documentary This Naked Age (1932). She also wrote several children's books, some of them in collaboration with her partner Zhenya Gay. Her story gained prominence after the publication of the investigative novel Blackouts (2023) by Justin Torres, the winner of the 2023 National Book Award.

== Early life ==
Jan Gay was born Helen Reitman on February 14, 1902 in Leipzig, Germany to parents Ben Reitman, an American physician, gynecologist, and anarchist who is known for being one of Emma Goldman's lovers, and May Schwartz, an American musician. Reitman abandoned Gay and Schwartz when Schwartz was still pregnant in 1901, a decision that Reitman expressed regret for over the years despite the fact that he and Gay never mended their fraught relationship. Schwartz was institutionalized when Gay was a child, and Gay was raised by several of her mother's relatives in the midwest.

She legally changed her name to "Jan Gay" in 1927. According to her half-sister, the name "Gay" was taken from a maternal grandmother. It is also speculated by researchers that she chose the name "Gay" to allude to her lesbianism, given that her name change took place around the time that the word "gay" started to become adopted by homosexuals.

== Early career ==
Gay worked several different jobs in her early career. She started reporting for Chicago's Herald-Examiner in 1922 after she completed her education at Northwestern University. She then moved on to work for the National Railways of Mexico in the late 1920s as a secretary and translator, traveling to places in Mexico, South America, and Europe. It was also around this time that she met Eleanor Byrnes (her partner of many years who later changed her name to Zhenya Gay), and together the two wrote and published a set of children's books called The Shire Colt.

While in Europe, Gay became interested in the practice of nudism and wrote a book titled On Going Naked (1932) about her experiences with nudism in Europe. The book included photographs of nude people that Gay took during her time there, as well as illustrations by Zhenya. It later served as the basis for a documentary titled This Nude World which Gay wrote the script for. According to Gay, "human bodies are phenomena no more spectacular than trees." Gay opened a nudist resort, the Out-of-Doors Club, in Highland, New York and was therefore credited by Buffalo Evening News as "the leader of nudism in New York".

== Research ==
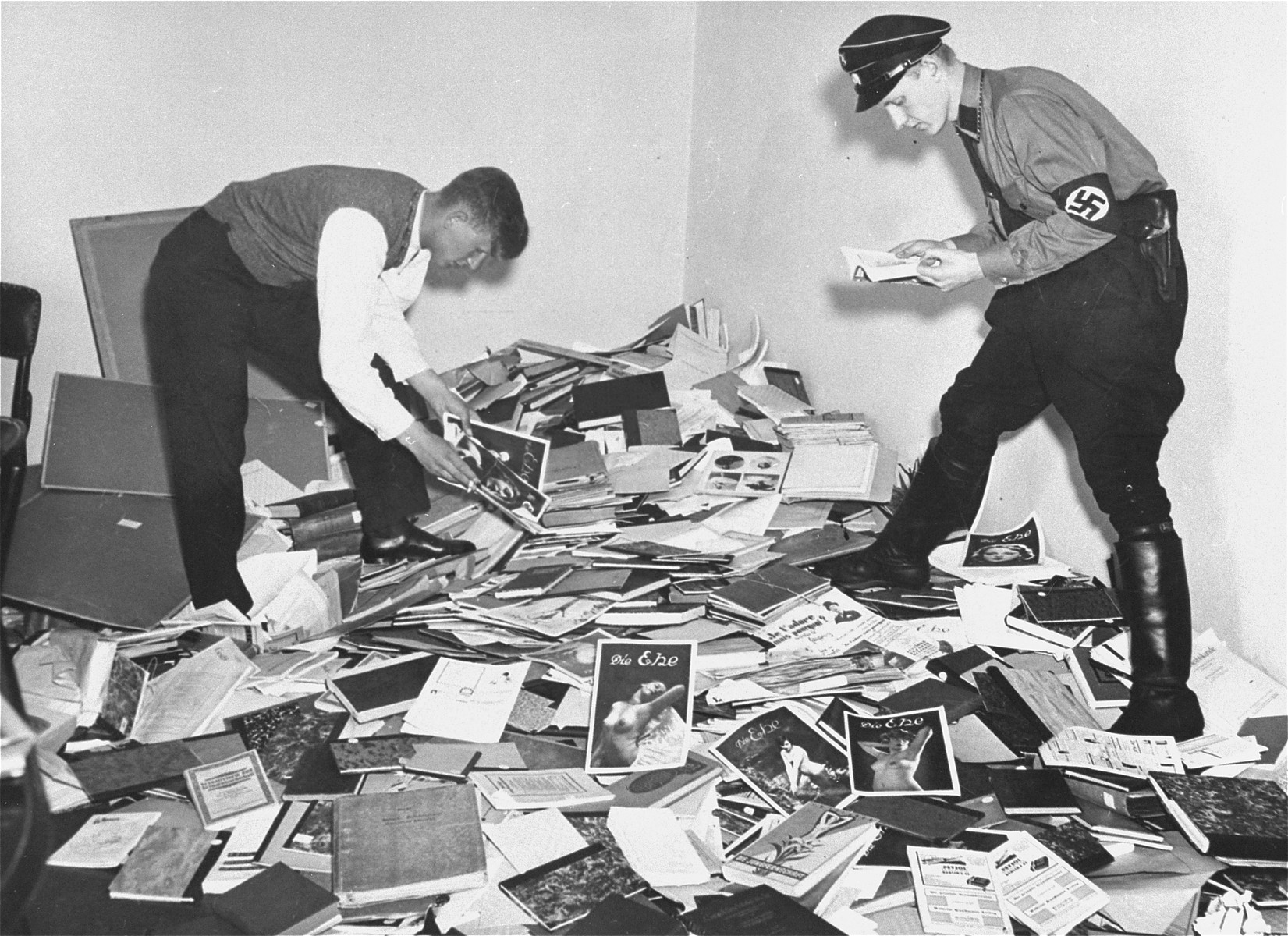
The Institute for Sexual Science in Berlin, which Gay visited and inspired her to pursue her research, was destroyed by Nazi authorities and its library burned down in 1933.

In the 1920s, Gay grew a strong interest in the study of homosexuality. After visiting Magnus Hirschfeld's Institute for Sexual Science in Berlin and learning the methods to conduct a questionnaire on sexuality, Gay embarked on her own career in research. Over the next ten years she garnered over three hundred interviews with lesbians in Europe and New York. The survey included both the participants' general life experiences and their homosexual experiences. Yet, to get published, Gay was forced to have medical backing to confirm her research, leading her to select Robert Latou Dickinson as her research collaborator.

Dickinson was a strong medical advocate for birth control in the 1920s and 30s. His work exploring and studying homosexual cases without the commonly held disdain for it could have intrigued Gay and influenced her choice to collaborate with him. Dickinson saw the potential for Gay's research to perhaps enlighten new ideas about homosexuality. He not only agreed to launch a "large-scale medical investigation of homosexuality", therefore certifying Gay's work for publishing, but also gave her money to start it. Yet, in the process of applying for further sponsorship from the maternal health committee, Dickinson failed to gain approval from the majority of the members, who did not see this research as in line with the committee's overall objectives. This disapproval led Dickinson to create his own committee, "The Committee for the Study of Sex Variants". In the process of recruiting members for the committee, psychiatrist George W. Henry was eventually assigned as Gay's research director.

Gay's sex variants study moved to include men when she met Thomas Painter, another gay researcher, who was studying male prostitution. With his connections to the homosexual world, Painter joined her study. The two of them gathered a group of lesbians and gay men to conduct interviews. The interviews included questions about participants' personal lives, work experiences, sexual habits, and perspectives on homosexuality. The participants' narratives revealed shared experiences and struggles with being gay which were previously hidden in the medical field. One of the participants, an artist named Ellen T., stated "In the beginning I was very silly about homosexuality. Never for a moment did I think it was anything very wrong... I know now that that is stupid." In addition to interviews, Henry also conducted medical examinations on the participants to assess their physical masculine and feminine traits. The result turned out to counter the conventional belief that gay men and lesbians would display physical traits opposite to their biological sex, as Henry reported that four-fifths of the male participants displayed masculine traits such as athletic physique and broad shoulders.

In the process of research, Gay gradually lost control of the study, and was barely mentioned in the acknowledgments of the final publication of the study. In the study, Henry concluded that homosexuals were "socially maladjusted individuals who could not adapt to social laws and conventions", and could be prevented through a set of "occupational, psychiatric, and institutional treatment". Yet, despite Gay's initiative being appropriated and the research data being maneuvered to fit the medical experts' goal of displaying homosexuality as a social problem to be solved, Minton, the author of Departing from Deviance, argues that Gay's effort still held considerable significance to LGBTQ activism. The personal stories collected in the Sex Variants Study, which revealed that a lot of subjects were not ashamed and were even proud of their identities, were significant to the self-attitudes of other gay and lesbian readers of the era, thus serving as a powerful counterpoint to Henry's negative attitudes towards homosexuality in the study.

== Personal life ==
Gay was openly a lesbian, and her identity informed her research interests. She had a long partnership with illustrator Zhenya Gay (born Eleanor Byrnes). The pair lived in New York City together and collaborated on their children's books, as well as the book On Going Naked, which promoted their love for nudism. By the 1940s, Gay and Zhenya had split up. According to Gay's close collaborator on the Sex Variants study, Thomas Painter, Zhenya was the one who "left" Gay. In the 1940s, Gay had a relationship with dancer and activist Franziska Boas. Her relationship with Boas ended in 1950, the same year that Boas moved to Rome, Georgia, and Gay moved to California. Gay died in 1960 at the age of 58.

== In media ==
Jan Gay and the Sex Variants Study play a key role in Justin Torres's 2023 novel Blackouts. Blackouts tells the story of an older man named Juan Gay who discovers a copy of Sex Variants: A Study of Homosexual Patterns. Distressed that Jan Gay's contributions to the study have been largely sidelined, Juan enlists an unnamed narrator to complete her work. Torres's novel acknowledges and attempts to correct how Gay's work has long been erased from modern understandings of queer history.

== Books ==
=== Essay ===
- On Going Naked (1932, 1940). Translated to Spanish as Andando desnudos (1996).
- Sex Variants: A Study of Homosexual Patterns (1941) (only credited in acknowledgments)

=== Children's books ===
- Pancho and His Burro (with Zhenya Gay) (1930)
- The Shire Colt (with Zhenya Gay) (1931)
- The Goat who Wouldn't be Good (with Zhenya Gay) (1931)
- The Mutt Book (with Zhenya Gay) (1932)
- Town Cats. A Book of Drawings (with Zhenya Gay) (1933)
