= We the Animals (film) =

- Theatrical release poster
- Directed by: Jeremiah Zagar
- Screenplay by: Jeremiah Zagar; Dan Kitrosser
- Based on: We the Animals by Justin Torres
- Produced by: Jeremy Yaches; Christina D. King; Andrew Goldman; Paul Mezey
- Starring: Evan Rosado; Raúl Castillo; Sheila Vand; Isaiah Kristian; Josiah Gabriel
- Cinematography: Zak Mulligan
- Edited by: Keiko Deguchi; Brian A. Kates
- Music by: Nick Zammuto
- Production companies: Cinereach; Public Record
- Distributed by: The Orchard
- Release dates: January 20, 2018 (Sundance); August 17, 2018 (United States)
- Running time: 93 minutes
- Country: United States
- Language: English
- Box office: $400,961

We the Animals is a 2018 American coming-of-age drama film, directed by Jeremiah Zagar and written by Zagar and Dan Kitrosser, based on the novel of the same name by Justin Torres. The film marks Zagar's first narrative feature film. The film stars Evan Rosado, Raúl Castillo, Sheila Vand, Isaiah Kristian, and Josiah Gabriel. It premiered at the 2018 Sundance Film Festival and was released on August 17, 2018, by The Orchard.

== Premise ==
Jonah grows up with rambunctious brothers in a working class mixed-race family in upstate New York and must contend with both his volatile father and his emerging homosexuality.

== Cast ==
- Evan Rosado as Jonah
- Raúl Castillo as Paps
- Sheila Vand as Ma
- Isaiah Kristian as Manny
- Josiah Gabriel as Joel
- Giovanni Pacciarelli as Dustin
- Moe Isaac as Dustin's Grandpa
- Michael Pemberton as Foreman George
- Mickey Anthony as Clerk Kevin
- Amelia Campbell as Woman in Van
- Tom Malley as Old Man
- Terry Holland as Televangelist Voice

== Production ==
The film was shot on grainy 16mm film and includes colored pencil animated sequences. The cinematographer, Zak Mulligan, said "there was a lot of effort to create [a] feeling of intimacy" and noted that much of the film was shot at child's-eye-height. The actors who played the brothers and parents lived together during production so they would feel like a real family. The director, Jeremiah Zagar, involved the novel's author Justin Torres throughout the process, saying Torres "was on the set, and he read every draft of the script...He was even in the editing room". The film is dedicated to the memory of Tim Hetherington.

== Reception ==
Critics compared the film to Moonlight and Tree of Life and variously called it impressionistic, intimate, woozy, and evocative. On review aggregator website Rotten Tomatoes, the film holds an approval rating of 92% based on 103 reviews, with an average rating of 7.7/10. The website's critical consensus reads, "Dreamlike and haunting, We the Animals approaches the coming-of-age odyssey with a uniquely documentarian eye." On Metacritic, which assigns a rating to reviews, the film has a weighted average score of 83 out of 100, based on 25 critics, indicating "universal acclaim". The film won the Sundance NEXT Innovator Award and was nominated for five 2019 Independent Spirit Awards.
