= Sam Bailey (director) =

American writer, producer, director, and actress

- Born: Samantha Bailey; 1989 (age 36–37); Chicago, Illinois, U.S.
- Occupations: Writer, director, producer, actress
- Years active: 2015–present
- Notable work: You're So Talented, Brown Girls

Samantha Bailey (born 1989) is an American writer, producer, director, and actress. She is known for the web series You're So Talented and Brown Girls.

== Career ==
Bailey was born and raised in Chicago, Illinois in the Logan Square neighborhood. She began stage acting as a teenager and received her bachelor's degree from Columbia College Chicago.

After graduation, Bailey began acting professionally in the city's theatre community. She was frustrated by the quality of roles she was cast in and used that frustration to inform writing a sketch that would become You're So Talented. She rose to prominence for the self-produced web series, a semi-autobiographical story about a struggling 25-year-old actress in Chicago. It was her first time directing and writing. You're So Talented was nominated for a Gotham Award in 2015.

In 2017 she co-produced the web series Brown Girls with poet Fatimah Asghar, which starred two young women coming to terms with queer identity, and navigating career and relationships. The series received a nomination for a 2017 Primetime Emmy Award for Outstanding Short Form Comedy or Drama Series. Bailey and Asghar signed a deal to develop the series with HBO.

She co-produced the short documentary film Masculine/Masculine with Hank Jones at the 2018 LA Film Fest.

Bailey has directed episodes of the television series Alone Together, First Wives Club, East of La Brea, Grown-ish, Loosely Exactly Nicole, and Dear White People, for which she was also a writer and producer.

In April 2022, Bailey was selected to direct episodes of the superhero streaming series Ironheart, set in the Marvel Cinematic Universe.

== Personal life ==
Bailey resides in Los Angeles.

== Accolades ==
- 2018 – The Root 100 Honoree
- 2018 – Forbes 30 Under 30

== Awards and nominations ==
| Year | Award | Category | Work | Result |
|---|---|---|---|---|
| 2015 | Gotham Awards | Breakthrough Series - Short Form | You're So Talented | Nominated |
| 2017 | Primetime Emmy Awards | Outstanding Short Form Comedy or Drama | Brown Girls | Nominated |
| 2019 | SXSW | Grand Jury Award for Episodic Pilot | East of La Brea | Nominated |
