= Jessica Walsh =

American graphic designer

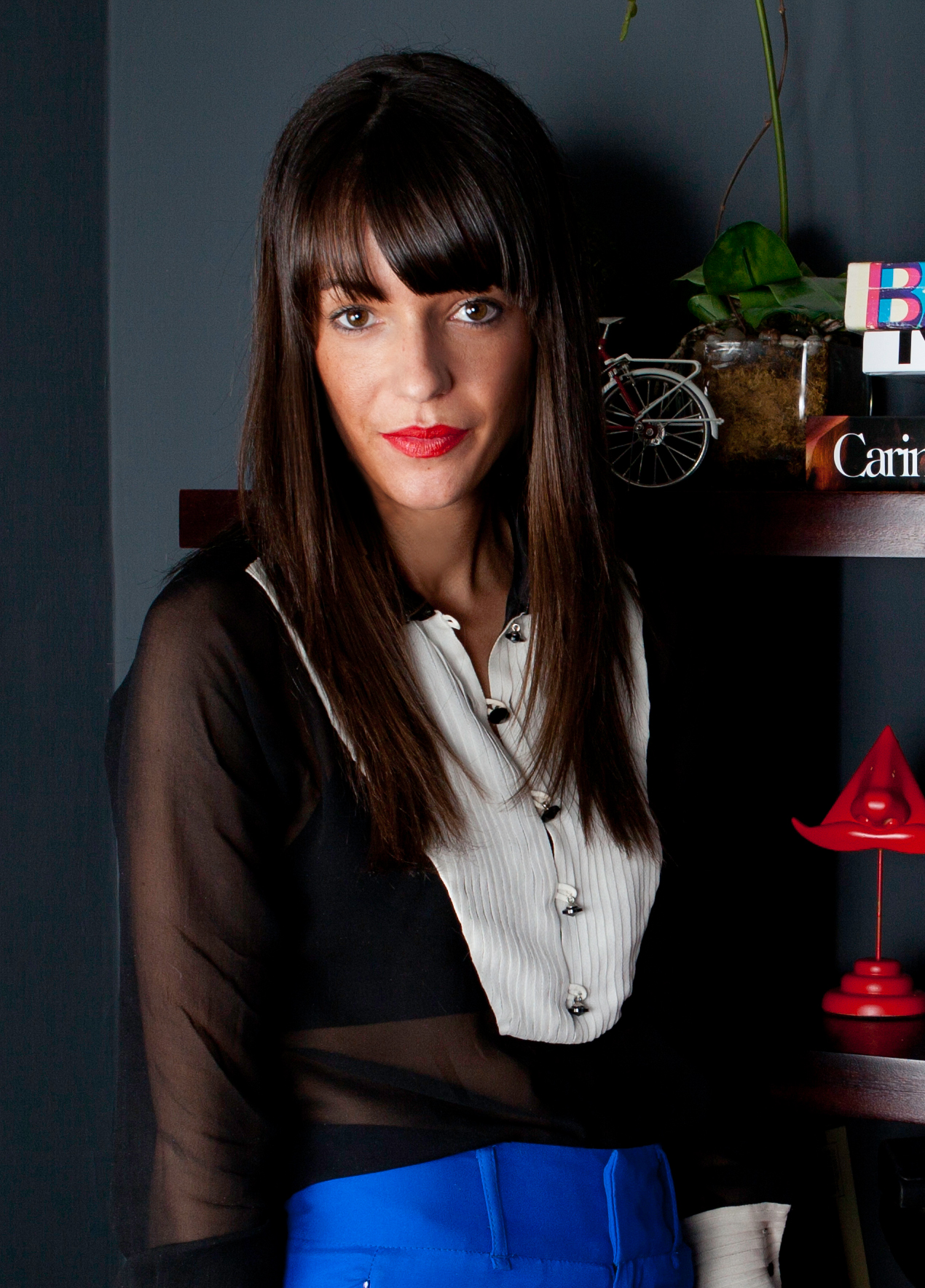
- Walsh (2013)
- Born: October 30, 1986 (age 39); New York, U.S.
- Education: Rhode Island School of Design
- Occupation: Art director
- Years active: 2008–present
- Spouse: Zak Mulligan
- Website: andwalsh.com

Jessica Walsh (born October 30, 1986) is an American designer, art director, illustrator and educator. She is the founder of the creative agency &Walsh based in New York City, and until 2019 was a partner at the design studio Sagmeister & Walsh with Austrian designer Stefan Sagmeister. Walsh has taught at the School of Visual Arts (SVA).

== Early life and education ==
Walsh was born on October 30, 1986, in New York and raised in Ridgefield, Connecticut. She began coding and designing websites at age 11. After a year of making her own websites and blogs, she made a website for kids to learn how to code using HTML and CSS and to make their own websites. Walsh became interested in coding after building a website for her Neopet. Eventually her website had about 50,000 people visiting per day. She put Google Ads on her site and made a couple thousand dollars per month. This was a turning point for Walsh because she realized she could make money from design and websites. To advance her design knowledge, Walsh went on to study graphic design at the Rhode Island School of Design (RISD), where she received a BFA degree in 2008.

== Career ==
After college, Walsh moved to New York City to intern at the design firm Pentagram. She turned down a job at Apple where she was offered nearly $100,000 annually, to accept an internship offer under Paula Scher at Pentagram, where she would stay for nearly a year. Walsh has stated that she turned down the Apple job offer because she knew she would be doing one type of design for one client that already had an established look and feel. She knew her goal was to open her own studio and this job was not on the route to her goal. She then worked as an associate art director at Print magazine and had design work and illustrations appear in the New York Times and New York Times Magazine. In reflections about her time at Print magazine, she identifies it as one of the best things to happen in her career as it was how she found and developed her personal style.

=== Sagmeister & Walsh ===
In February 2010, Jessica Walsh sent Stefan Sagmeister a “super-long, emotional email, unsure of where to go in life.” Walsh had never met Sagmeister before and the email only had the intention of trying to get some guidance. They soon met up and Sagmeister looked through Walsh's portfolio and offered her a job. Two years later in 2012, she became partners with Stefan Sagmeister to form Sagmeister & Walsh. Walsh primarily worked with clients while Sagmeister traveled and focused on his films. In homage to a nude self-portrait Sagmeister had sent out to announce the formation of his own firm 19 years prior, the new partners released a photo of themselves naked in their office to announce the renaming of the firm to Sagmeister & Walsh.

Blending handcraft, photography and painting with digital design, Walsh works primarily on branding, typography, website design and art installations. Her style has been described as "bold, emotional and provocative" with the occasional surrealistic flourish, and her art has been said to look "hand-made and at times quite daring." Walsh and Sagmeister collaborated on Six Things: Sagmeister & Walsh, an exhibition that opened at the Jewish Museum in March 2013, and ran for five months. For the exhibit, an exploration of happiness, they created a sound-activated sculpture and five short films.

==== Clients ====
Walsh has worked on projects for clients including Levi's, Aizone, Adobe and Colab Eyewear, and rebranding efforts for The Jewish Museum of New York and the Aldrich Contemporary Art Museum in Connecticut. Other clients Walsh has worked with include BMW, Snapchat, Barneys New York and Parle Argo, “the Coca-Cola of India.”

=== &Walsh ===
In July 2019, Walsh announced she was going to leave Sagmeister & Walsh to form her own studio, &Walsh. Walsh has said that the studio is a fulfillment of her dreams as a teen to run her own business and the studio will become one of 36 female-led creative studios in the United States. &Walsh is one of the .1% of creative agencies owned by women. The company works with brands in early stages with main focus on branding, advertising, and digital design. Walsh has said that its creative approach helps brands "find their weird," which means finding and highlighting unique and unusual traits in brand identity and visual communication.

=== Other work ===
Walsh teaches design and typography at the School of Visual Arts in New York. She is represented by Creative Artists Agency.

== Selected works ==
=== 40 Days of Dating ===
In 2013, Walsh and fellow designer and friend Tim Goodman decided to date for 40 days to see if they could overcome their relationship issues and fall in love. They documented the social experiment on a website, 40 Days of Dating, launched in July 2013. The website is a blog and has entries from both Walsh and Goodman everyday answering the same questions throughout the 40 days. This project got a lot of attention online and has been used as an example of how digital platforms can be used to combine personal stories with design and social experiments.

They answered the same questions each day which were:

- Did you see (the other person) today?
- What did y’all do together?
- Did anything interesting happen?
- Did you learn anything new about (the other person)?
- Did you learn anything about yourself?
- How do you feel about this relationship/project right now?
- Is there anything you want to do differently?
- Additional comments?

In support of the blog, which earned more than 5 million unique visitors in less than a year, they appeared in segments on talk shows Today and The View. In September 2013, Warner Brothers purchased the film rights, with a screenplay to be written by Lorene Scafaria, and Michael Sucsy attached to direct. Walsh and Goodman were to serve as consulting writers on the script, but the rights subsequently lapsed. The two also wrote a book for Abrams, 40 Days of Dating: An Experiment, in 2015.

=== 12 Kinds of Kindness ===
In 2016, Walsh and Goodman began a second project together, which they described as a "12-step experiment designed to open [their] hearts, eyes, and minds". They set up twelve tasks in which they displayed kindness to people and recorded the results. The experiment ran from January 13 until March 15, 2016.

==== Let's Talk About Mental Health ====
Walsh has a project called Let's Talk About Mental Health that is on her 12 Kinds of Kindness website. This project tackles the stigma of sharing struggles with mental health. It contains posts of different people's honest accounts of dealing with mental illness. This project was inspired by Walsh's 12 Kinds of Kindness’ Step four: learning to forgive yourself for something in your past. In step four, Walsh writes about her past struggles with anorexia, depression and self-harm. Not only did she share her past struggles but so did her friends and colleagues. She published the stories on the website and invited everyone to add their stories through the website.

=== Ladies, Wine and Design ===
Walsh started Ladies, Wine & Design, a nonprofit organization to encourage women and non-binary people to work together rather than compete, in 2016. Walsh created Ladies, Wine and Design in response to the statistic that in the creative industry only three percent of women are in leadership positions. This organization was born out of Walsh's personal experiences with sexism in the design industry, from both men and other women. Ladies, Wine and Design started out as eight women in Walsh's apartment drinking wine, talking about design, and discussing their careers as women in the industry. As of 2022, LWD has grown to have 280+ local chapters around the world. Each chapter is free to join and the events are free and accessible to all. LWD offers free mentorship circles, talks, and networking events around the world. The long term goal for the organization is to take their initiative to underserved high schools to foster the future of women, non-binary and underrepresented people in creative communities. This project has grown into an international network that offers women and non-binary creatives mentorship, community support, and chances to grow professionally.

=== Type of Feeling ===
Walsh started Type of Feeling, a type foundry that took about five years to make, in 2024. The project is about making typefaces that make people feel certain things, which is a new area for her that goes beyond branding.

=== #SorryIHaveNoFilter ===
Walsh worked on a project throughout the years called #SorryIHaveNoFilter. This project started out when she worked at Sagmeister & Walsh. The project was based on Walsh's Instagram series with the same name that continued to grow with her throughout her career.

== Design style ==
Walsh's work is distinguished by vivid colors, experimental typography, and the incorporation of photography, illustration, and hand-crafted elements. She has said that her creative approach encourages brands to "find their weird" by focusing on finding and highlighting the unique traits that make up a brand's identity and visual communication. Walsh's work has also looked at themes of identity and self-perception through experimental projects that mix design with personal stories.

== Honors and awards ==
- New Star of Design, Computer Arts, 2010
- Society of Publication Designers award, 2010
- Young Gun Award, Art Directors Club, 2011
- New Visual Artist Award, Print magazine, 2011
- The Envy Index: 25 Under 25, The L Magazine, 2011
- Type Director's Club Award, Les Arts Décoratifs poster, 2012
- Graphis, Design Annual 2012, Gold
- 25 People Shaping the Future of Design, Complex, 2013
- People to Watch, GD USA, 2013
- Webby Award, Best Home/Welcome Page, Sagmeister & Walsh, 2014
- Graphis, Photography Annual 2015, Gold
- Forbes “30 Under 30: Art & Style” List, 2015
- President’s Award, Design and Art Direction (D&AD), 2024

== Personal life ==
Walsh lives in New York City with her husband, cinematographer Zak Mulligan. Walsh's sister, Lauren Walsh, works with Jessica at &Walsh, running operations and new business. Both Jessica and her sister Lauren suffer from migraines.
