= Open Heart (film) =

- Directed by: Kief Davidson
- Produced by: Kief Davidson
- Cinematography: Zak Mulligan
- Distributed by: ShortsHD; HBO
- Release date: 2012

Open Heart is a 2012 short documentary film directed by Kief Davidson about eight Rwandan children who leave their families to receive heart surgery. The film was nominated for the 2013 Academy Award for Best Documentary (Short Subject).

After being nominated for an Academy Award the film was released along with all the other 15 Oscar-nominated short films in theaters by ShortsHD.
