= Zak Mulligan =

American cinematographer

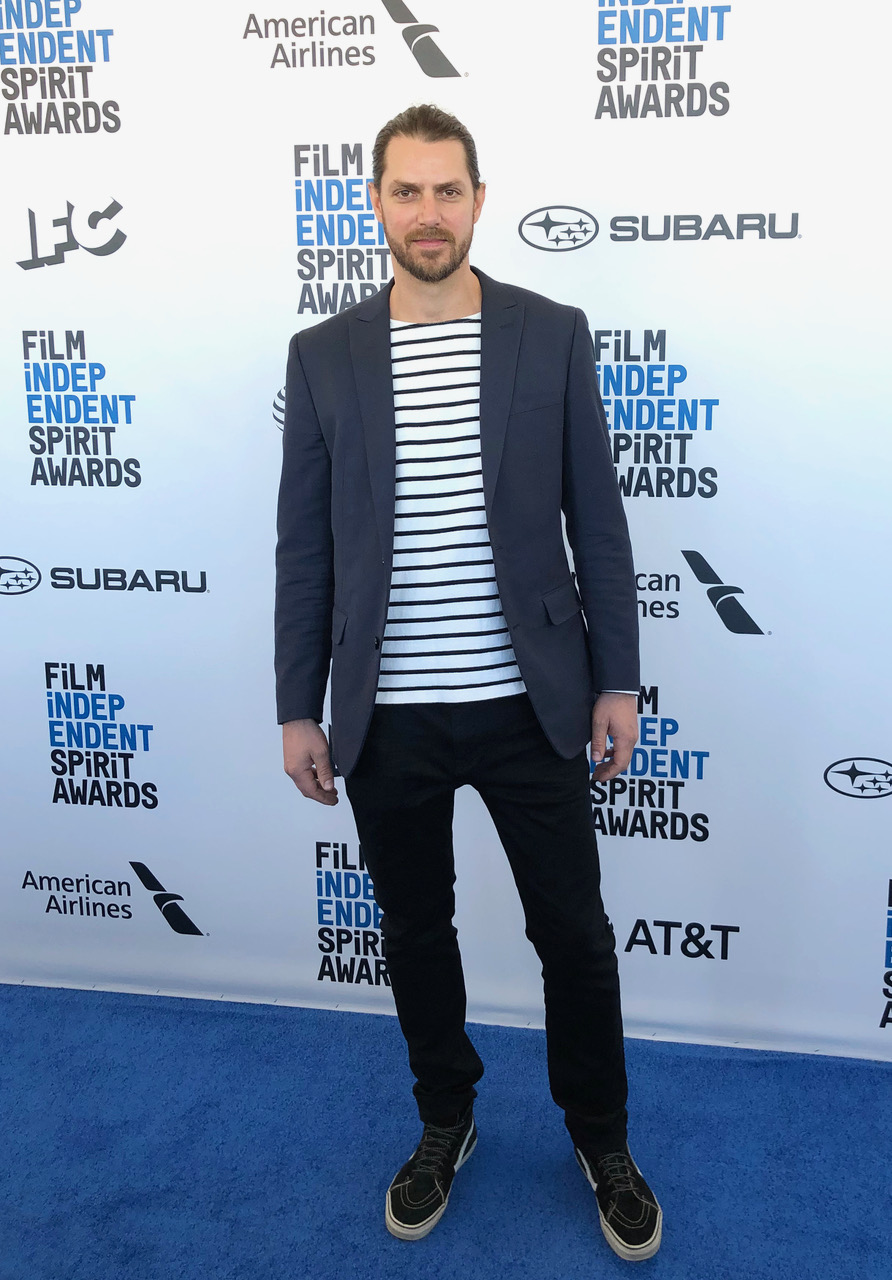
- Born: Toledo, Ohio, U.S.
- Occupation: Cinematographer
- Years active: 2006–present
- Spouse: Jessica Walsh

Zak Mulligan is an American film and television cinematographer. He is best known for his work on Hustle, We the Animals, The Outsider, and Open Heart.

== Career ==
Mulligan was born and raised in Ohio. He started his film career in New York City shortly after studying Photography at Arizona State University. In 2010 he won Best Cinematography at the Sundance Film Festival for his film Obselidia. In 2015, Variety listed him as one of the "10 Cinematographers to Watch". His TV work includes the Jason Bateman and Ben Mendelsohn HBO series, The Outsider. He collaborated with director Jeremiah Zagar on the Adam Sandler film Hustle (2022) and We the Animals (2018) which premiered at Sundance and was nominated for Best Cinematography at the Independent Spirit Awards. He is a member of the International Cinematographers Guild (ICG) and Academy of Motion Picture Arts and Sciences (AMPAS).

== Personal life ==
Mulligan lives in New York City with his wife, designer Jessica Walsh.

== Filmography ==
- 2026 – Killing Castro
- 2025 – Happy Gilmore 2
- 2022 – Hustle
- 2020 – The Most Dangerous Animal of All
- 2020 – The Outsider
- 2020 – Sundays at the Triple Nickel
- 2018 – We the Animals
- 2018 – Julian Got the Part
- 2018 – ReMastered: Who Shot the Sheriff?
- 2017 – Traces: Hypnotized
- 2016 – Custody
- 2015 – For Justice
- 2015 – Bleeding Heart
- 2014 – House of Cards
- 2014 – The Sisterhood of Night
- 2014 – 7 Deadly Sins
- 2013 – King Theodore Live
- 2013 – Blumenthal
- 2013 – Always a Fire
- 2013 – Futurestates
- 2012 – Open Heart
- 2012 – Emergency
- 2012 – Chappo: 5-0
- 2012 – Future Weather
- 2011 – I'm Not Me Film
- 2010 – Obselidia
- 2009 – ReRun
- 2009 – You're Gonna Feel Funny After
- 2007 – Coney Island
- 2007 – Getting Back
- 2007 – A Piece of America
- 2006 – Underdogs
- 2006 – Pillow Talk
- 2006 – Promenade
- 2006 – The Rehearsal
- 2006 – Killing Killian
- 2006 – Purity
