= Whistlers' Van =

1936 children's book by Idwal Jones

- Author: Idwal Jones
- Illustrator: Zhenya Gay
- Publisher: Viking
- Publication date: April 1, 1936
- Pages: 235

Whistlers' Van is a 1936 children's novel written by Idwal Jones and illustrated by Zhenya Gay. Set in post-World War I rural Wales, it tells the story of a young farmboy, Gwilym, who spends one summer traveling with the gypsies. The novel was a Newbery Honor recipient in 1937. Kirkus Reviews called the book "sheer enchantment", and the New York Times review called it a "distinguished book" that "will appeal [...] to readers of any age".
