= Stefan Sagmeister =

Austrian artist

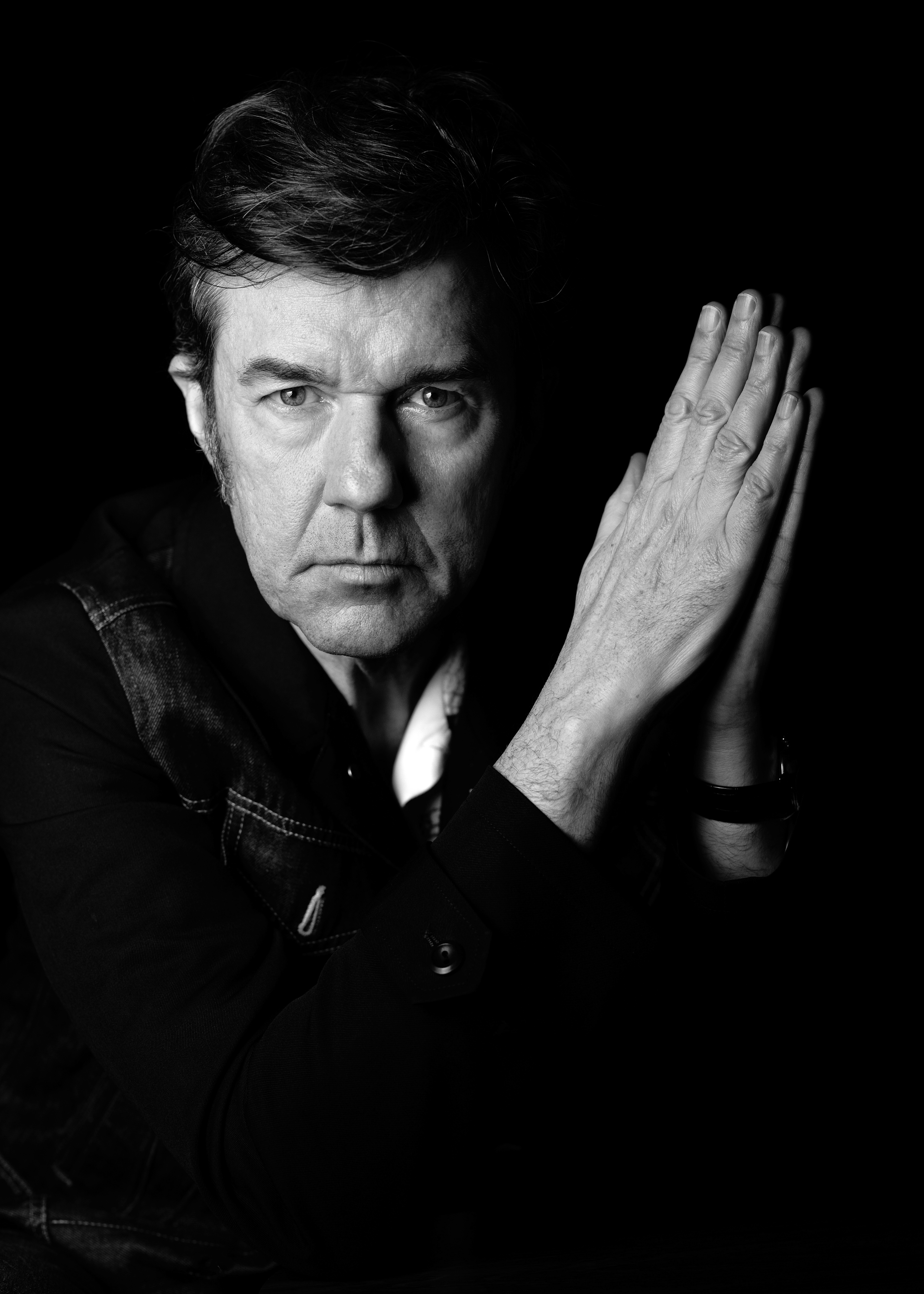
- Sagmeister in 2026
- Born: August 6, 1962 (age 64); Bregenz, Austria
- Education: Hochschule fuer Angewandte Kunst, Vienna, Pratt Institute, New York City
- Known for: Graphic design, film
- Website: sagmeister.com

Stefan Sagmeister (born August 6, 1962) is an Austrian graphic designer, storyteller, and typographer based in New York City. In 1993, Sagmeister founded his company, Sagmeister Inc., to create designs for the music industry. He has designed album covers for Lou Reed, OK Go, The Rolling Stones, David Byrne, Jay Z, Aerosmith, Talking Heads, Brian Eno and Pat Metheny. From 2011 until 2019 he partnered with Jessica Walsh under the name Sagmeister & Walsh Inc.

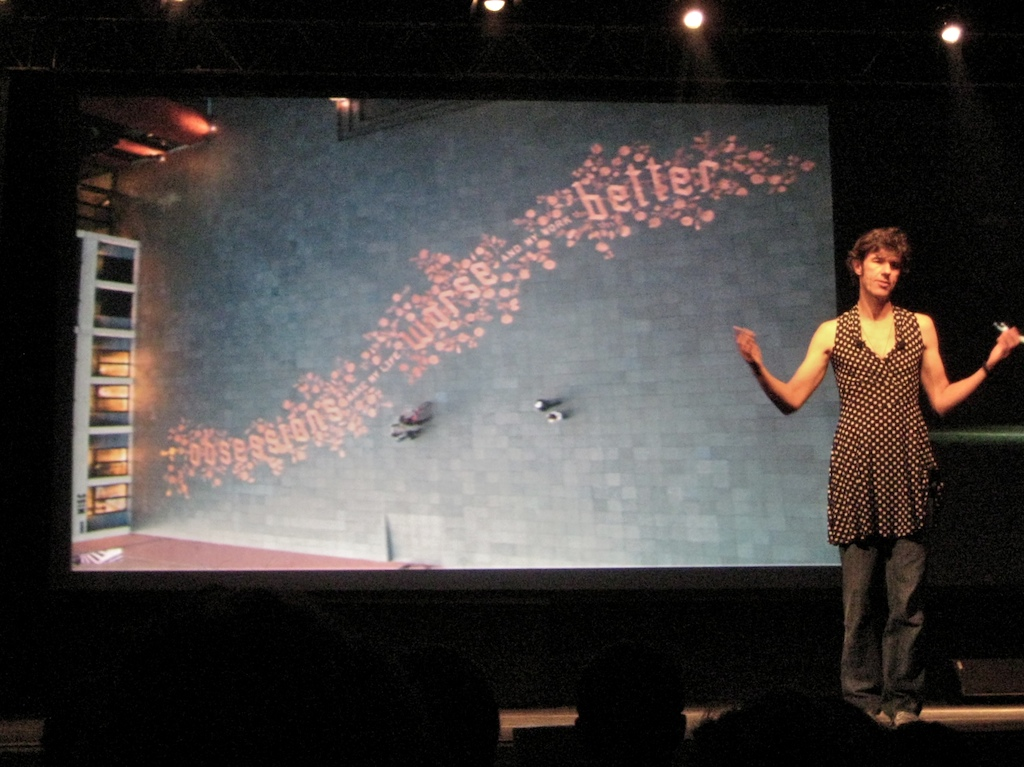
Stefan Sagmeister dressed as "La Sciùra Maria" at OFFF 2009 in Oeiras, Portugal.

== Early life and education ==
He began his design career at the age of 15 at "Alphorn", an Austrian Youth magazine, which is named after the traditional Alpine musical instrument. Sagmeister studied graphic design at the Hochschule fuer Angewandte Kunst, Vienna, graduating in 1986. He later won a Fulbright scholarship to study at the Pratt Institute in New York, where he received a Master of Fine Arts degree.

== Design career ==
In 1991, Sagmeister worked with Leo Burnett's Hong Kong Design Group. In 1993, he returned to New York to work with Tibor Kalman's M & Co. design company. In 1993, he set up his company Sagmeister Inc in New York. He has since designed branding, graphics, and packaging for clients as diverse as the Rolling Stones, HBO, the Guggenheim Museum and Time Warner. He is the author of the design monograph "Made You Look" which was published by Booth-Clibborn editions. He teaches in the graduate design department of the School of Visual Arts in New York and was previously the Frank Stanton Chair at the Cooper Union School of Art, New York.

== Works and projects ==
Stefan Sagmeister has produced multiple exhibitions that blend graphic design with research, interactive installation, and thematic inquiry. His exhibitions often combine visual communication with broader questions about human experience, perception, and data.

=== The Happy Show ===
The Happy Show is a thematic exhibition centered on Sagmeister’s ten‑year exploration of happiness and how it can be understood and shaped. First presented in 2012 at the Institute of Contemporary Art in Philadelphia, it subsequently toured major institutions including the Design Exchange in Toronto, Museum of Contemporary Art, Los Angeles, and the Museum Angewandte Kunst in Frankfurt am Main in 2016.

The show features a mix of experimental typography, infographics, film, print, sculpture and interactive installations that encourage visitors to engage directly with concepts related to happiness. Sagmeister incorporated personal experiments such as tests of meditation, cognitive behavioural therapy, and mood enhancers alongside scientific and social data from psychologists and researchers like Daniel Gilbert, Steven Pinker, and Jonathan Haidt, placing individual experience in a broader context.

=== Sagmeister & Walsh: Beauty ===
Presented in 2019, Sagmeister & Walsh: Beauty was developed in collaboration with designer Jessica Walsh and shown at venues including the Museum Angewandte Kunst in Frankfurt/Main and the MAK in Vienna.

His multimedia exhibition examined the concept of beauty through examples from graphic design, product design, architecture, and urban planning. The show aimed to explore why people are drawn to beauty and how aesthetic qualities influence perception and everyday experience, arguing that beauty is not merely decorative but can have functional value.

The exhibition included around 70 object groups and installations across themed sections such as “What is Beauty,” “The Eye of the Beholder,” and “Transformational Beauty,” inviting visitors to engage with beauty in varied contexts.

=== Now Is Better ===
Now Is Better is a long‑term project that Sagmeister and his studio have developed since 2019, with major public showings in 2023 and 2024. It visualizes long‑term statistical data including trends in democracy, war and peace, health, and literacy by embedding contemporary graphic compositions into 18th‑ and 19th‑century historical paintings.

The exhibition debuted at Patrick Parrish Gallery in New York and has toured internationally, including at the GGG Gallery in Tokyo and at venues in Seoul, South Korea.

=== It’s Getting Better ===
In 2024, Sagmeister presented It’s Getting Better at the K11 Museum in Shanghai, an expanded iteration of the Now Is Better concept. The exhibition featured more than 100 works spread over 850 m² of gallery space.

In addition to data‑derived visual works, his exhibition included documentary materials and everyday objects such as water glasses and apparel connected to the exhibit’s themes. He designed to provide a comprehensive view of the long‑term trends represented in the project and to encourage visitors to consider shifts in global conditions over time.

=== Better and Better (Besser und Besser) ===
Better and Better (German: Besser und Besser) is a site‑specific installation presented at an altitude of over 3,000 metres in Sölden, Tyrol, Austria.

This project situates Sagmeister’s visual interventions in a high‑altitude location, integrating historic paintings with contemporary graphic inserts that often visualize local Austrian data. The setting the Ice Q glass cube at the mountaintop emphasizes the context of the works and the long‑term perspective that Sagmeister’s exhibitions explore.

=== Finally, Something Good ===
In October 2026, Sagmeister collaborated with German footwear brand Ekn on two shoe designs incorporating data visualization, with one depicting the distribution of renewable electricity sources and the other illustrating homelessness rates across six countries. The exhibition is located at La Gaîté Lyrique in Paris through Spring 2027.

== Awards ==
Sagmeister received a Grammy Award in 2005 in the Best Boxed or Special Limited Edition Package category for art directing Once in a Lifetime box set by Talking Heads. He received a second Grammy Award for his design of the David Byrne and Brian Eno album Everything That Happens Will Happen Today in the Grammy Award for Best Recording Package category on January 31, 2010.

In 2005, Sagmeister won the National Design Award for Communications from the Cooper-Hewitt National Design Museum. He received the 2009 Lucky Strike Designer Award. In 2013 Sagmeister was awarded the Golden Medal of Honor of the Republic of Austria.

In 2018, he was voted Austrian of the Year by the Austrian newspaper Die Presse.

== Exhibitions ==
- 2000 Design Biannual, Cooper-Hewitt National Design Museum, New York
- 2001 Stealing Eyeballs, Kunstlerhaus, Vienna; Solo exhibition, Gallery Frédéric Sanchez, Paris
- 2002 Solo exhibition, Museum of Applied Arts, Vienna 2003 Solo exhibition, Museum fur Gestaltung, Zurich, Switzerland; Solo exhibition, DDD Gallery Tokyo
- 2012 The Happy Show, Institute of Contemporary Art, Philadelphia
- 2013 The Happy Show, Design Exchange, Toronto
- 2013 The Happy Show. MOCA, at Pacific Design Center, Los Angeles
- 2013 Six Things: Sagmeister & Walsh, Jewish Museum, New York
- 2013 The Happy Show, Chicago Cultural Center
- 2013 The Happy Show, Paris, Gaite Lyrique
- 2015 The Happy Show, Museum of Applied Arts, Vienna
- 2015 The Happy Show, The Museum of Vancouver, Vancouver, Canada
- 2015 The Happy Show, Museum für angewandte Kunst Frankfurt
- 2018/2019 Sagmeister & Walsh: Beauty, Museum of Applied Arts, Vienna
- 2019 Sagmeister & Walsh: Beauty, Mak Frankfurt
- 2019 Sagmeister & Walsh: Beauty Museum für Kunst und Gewerbe Hamburg
- 2021 Sagmeister & Walsh: Beauty Fondation d’entreprise Martell
- 2021 Beautiful Numbers, Thomas Erben Gallery
- 2022 Sagmeister & Walsh: Beauty Vorarlberg Museum, Bregenz, Austria
- 2024 Better and Better, Ice Q, Austria
- 2024 It’s Getting Better, K11 Museum, Shanghai
- 2024 Besser, Galerie Maximilian Hutz, Austria
- 2024 This will be Boring, A4x Museum, Chengdu, China
- 2024 Master exhibit, SVA Gallery Chelsea, New York
- 2024 Beautiful Numbers, Lviv, Ukraine
- 2025 Por Fin, Algo Bueno, MAZ Museo, Guadalajara, Mexico
- 2025 My Butter is Better, Galeria Hilario Galguera, Madrid, Spain
- 2026 Finally, Something Good., Paris, La Gaîté Lyrique

== Filmography ==
- The Happy Film (2016, documentary)

== See also ==
- Category:Albums with cover art by Stefan Sagmeister
