= Blackouts (novel) =

2023 book by Justin Torres

- Author: Justin Torres
- Language: English
- Publisher: Macmillan Publishers
- Publication date: 2023
- Publication place: United States
- Pages: 320
- ISBN: 9780374716677

Blackouts is a 2023 historical fiction novel by Justin Torres, published by Macmillan Publishers. The book uses historical documents including the 1941 report Sex Variants: A Study of Homosexual Patterns by the Committee for the Study of Sex Variants in addition to historical photographs and illustrations to supplement the narrative. The real life Sex Variants study was based on the research of journalist Helen Reitman (who was also known as Jan Gay), who conducted hundreds of interviews with gay and lesbian people in Europe and New York City in the 1920s and 30s. Eighty of these interviews and case histories were eventually included in the 1941 Sex Variants study, published by Dr. George W. Henry, which concluded that homosexuality is a pathological condition. Excerpts from these firsthand accounts, in redacted form (redacted by Torres for literary effect), are interspersed throughout the book.

The book won the 2023 National Book Award for Fiction.

== Narrative ==
The book tells the story of Juan Gay, an old man who is living in an isolated institution known as The Palace. He is visited by the unnamed narrator (known affectionately by the nickname Nene) who has an interest in the life of Gay. Nene and Juan met briefly about a decade before when both were institutionalized at a mental hospital. And now Nene, suffering from gaps in his memory due to mental fugues, seeks the advice of Juan, whom he feels he can confide in. Gay had earlier discovered a copy of the 1941 medical book Sex Variants: A Study of Homosexual Patterns and is distraught that the work of Jan Gay, the journalist who conducted the interviews featured in the book, has been co-opted by medical professionals who described homosexuality in a derisive way. Juan, who is nearing death, tasks the narrator with completing the work of Jan Gay as well as his own work; formulating a new narrative of queer identity and history to pass onto future generations.

== Reception ==
Regarding the novel's unconventional narrative, Charles Arrowsmith of The Washington Post stated: "In some ways it’s more like collage, an ingenious assemblage of research, vignette, image and conceit. Its 'Blinkered Endnotes,' 'Postface' and picture credits point to a thousand avenues of further interest." Writing for The New York Times, Joshua Barone stated that the novel is "A dreamy novel that unfurls among mixed media and Socratic dialogues, moving freely between fact and fiction as it proposes and complicates questions about how history is made..." Also writing for The New York Times, historian Hugh Ryan commended Torres for his ability to metaphorically depict how queer identity has been suppressed from the records throughout history, stating: "The supreme pleasure of the book is its slow obliteration of any firm idea of reality — a perfect metaphor for the delirious disorientation that comes with learning queer history as an adult."

== Awards ==
Year	Award	Category	Result	Ref.
2023	Goodreads Choice Awards	Fiction	Nominated—19th	
2023	Los Angeles Times Book Prize	Fiction	Shortlisted	
2023	National Book Award	Fiction	Won	
2023	National Book Critics Circle Award	Fiction	Shortlisted	
2024	Commonwealth Club of California Book Awards	Fiction	Gold Medal	
2024	Commonwealth Club of California Book Awards	Fiction	Shortlisted	
2024	Lambda Literary Awards	Gay Fiction	Shortlisted	
2024	Mark Twain American Voice in Literature Award	—	Longlisted	
2024	Orwell Prize	Political Fiction	Shortlisted	
2025	International Dublin Literary Award	—	Longlisted	
