= Zhenya Gay =

American author and illustrator

- Born: Eleanor F. Byrnes; September 16, 1901; Norwood, Massachusetts, U.S.
- Died: August 3, 1978 (age 76)
- Other name: Eleanor Byrnes Reitman
- Occupations: Writer, illustrator
- Partner: Jan Gay

Zhenya Gay (born Eleanor F. Byrnes) (September 16, 1901 – August 3, 1978) was an American writer and illustrator, best known for her children's books.

== Early life and education ==
Eleanor Byrnes was born in 1901 in Norwood, Massachusetts, the daughter of Charles W. Byrnes and Alice Bell Smith Byrnes. She attended Columbia University, where she studied with Solon Borglum and Winold Reiss.

== Career ==
As a young woman, Gay created movie posters, newspaper advertisements, and costume designs for theater productions. She spent several years traveling and living in Europe, Mexico, and Central America. Her illustrations for The Poems of Catullus (1933) "caught the bacchanalian decadence" of the texts, according to one reviewer. In 1954, she left New York City for the Catskill Mountains, and lived on a farm in Saugerties, New York. In addition to her book illustrations, Gay also created standalone artworks, including aquatints, lithographs, and etchings, and wrote poetry and stories for children, often featuring animal characters, especially cats.

In 1941 Gay appeared as "guest story teller" at a children's library in Springfield, Massachusetts. She spoke at the Greenville Public Library in South Carolina in 1956. In 1961, she met with an audience of children at the Napa County Library in California.

== Selected works ==
Gay's works are held in the permanent collections of several museums, including the University of Michigan Museum of Art, the Fine Arts Museums of San Francisco, and the Seattle Art Museum. The Kerlan Collection at the University of Minnesota holds much of her work, as does the de Grummond Children's Literature Collection at the University of Southern Mississippi.

=== As author and illustrator ===
- Pancho and His Burro (1930)
- The Shire Colt (1931, with Jan Gay)
- Town Cats (1932, with Jan Gray)
- Sakimura (1936)
- Manuelito of Costa Rica (1940 with Pachita Crespi)
- Look! (1952)
- Jingle Jangle (1953)
- Wonderful Things! (1954)
- Bits & Pieces (1958)
- Small One (1958)
- The Dear Friends (1959)
- The Nicest Time of Year (1960)
- I'm Tired of Lions (1961)
- Who's Afraid? (1965)

=== As illustrator ===
- Anatole France, The Crimes of Sylvestre Bonnard (1931, translated by Lafcadio Hearn)
- The Poems of Catullus (1933, translated by Horace Gregory)
- Frances Clarke Sayers, Mr. Tidy Paws (1936)
- Whistlers' Van (1937)
- Oscar Wilde, The Ballad of Reading Gaol (1937)
- Agnes Fisher, Once upon a time; folk tales, myths and legends of the United Nations (1943)
- Christine Von Hagen, Chico of the Andes (1943)
- Arkady Gaidar, Timur and his Gang (1943, translated by Zina Voynow)
- Irving R. Melbo, Young neighbors in South America (1944)
- Irma Simonton Black, Toby, a Curious Cat (1948)
- Thomas De Quincey, Confessions of an English Opium-Eater (New York: The Heritage Press, 1950)
- Alfred Lewis, Treasure in the Andes (1952)
- Joseph E. Chipperfield, Beyond the Timberland Trail (1953)
- Miriam E. Mason, The Major and His Camels (1953)
- Miriam E. Mason, The Sugarbush Family (1954)

== Personal life ==
From 1927 until the 1940s, Gay was in a relationship with Jan Gay (born Helen Reitman, daughter of Ben Reitman), a children's book writer and sexuality researcher. Zhenya Gay died in 1978, at the age of 76.
