= We the Animals =

Book by Justin Torres

- First edition
- Author: Justin Torres
- Language: English
- Genre: Bildungsroman
- Publisher: Houghton Mifflin Harcourt
- Publication date: September 2, 2011
- Publication place: United States
- Media type: Print (hardcover), audiobook, ebook
- Pages: 144 pp.
- ISBN: 978-0-547-57672-5 (hardcover 1st ed.)
- OCLC: 694830162
- Dewey Decimal: 813/.6

We the Animals (2011) is the debut novel by American author Justin Torres. It is a bildungsroman about three wild brothers of white and Puerto Rican parentage who live a rough and tumble childhood in rural upstate New York during the 1980s. The youngest brother, protagonist of the story, eventually breaks away from the rest of the family.

The novel is semi-autobiographical and is loosely based on Torres's own life growing up in upstate New York.

== Plot ==
The young, unnamed narrator, a boy, grows up in a tight-knit family with two older brothers, Manny and Joel. His parents, who were teenagers when the boys were conceived, have an abusive and unhappy marriage but still feel love for each other.

In a series of vignettes, the narrator describes how his parents struggle to keep the family afloat and how his father, and eventually his brothers, are abusive towards his mother who is deeply unhappy and longs for a better life.

As the narrator grows up, he senses a difference between himself and his brothers, which is partially caused by his love of literature and partially caused by the fact that he is gay. After his parents discover his journal, which is filled with erotic imaginings and fantasies, the narrator lashes out, violently attacking his parents and sibling, after which he is committed to a psychiatric ward.

== Reception ==
=== Critical response ===
We the Animals received generally positive reviews, including warm notices from The New York Times and Kirkus Reviews, and praise from novelists and writers like Michael Cunningham, Dorothy Allison and Paul Harding.

=== Awards ===
Year	Award	Category	Result	Ref.
2012	ALA Rainbow Book List	Young Adult Fiction	Selection	
2012	Andrew Carnegie Medals for Excellence	Fiction	Longlisted	
2012	First Novelist Award	—	Won	
2012	Indies Choice Book Award	Debut Author	Honor Book	
2012	NAACP Image Awards	Debut Author	Finalist	
2012	Publishing Triangle Awards	Edmund White Award	Finalist	

=== Influence ===
Fatimah Asghar acknowledges We the Animals as an influence in her novel When We Were Sisters.

== Film adaptation ==
A film adaptation of We the Animals, directed by Jeremiah Zagar, premiered at the 2018 Sundance Film Festival.
