= Brown Girls =

Comedy web series

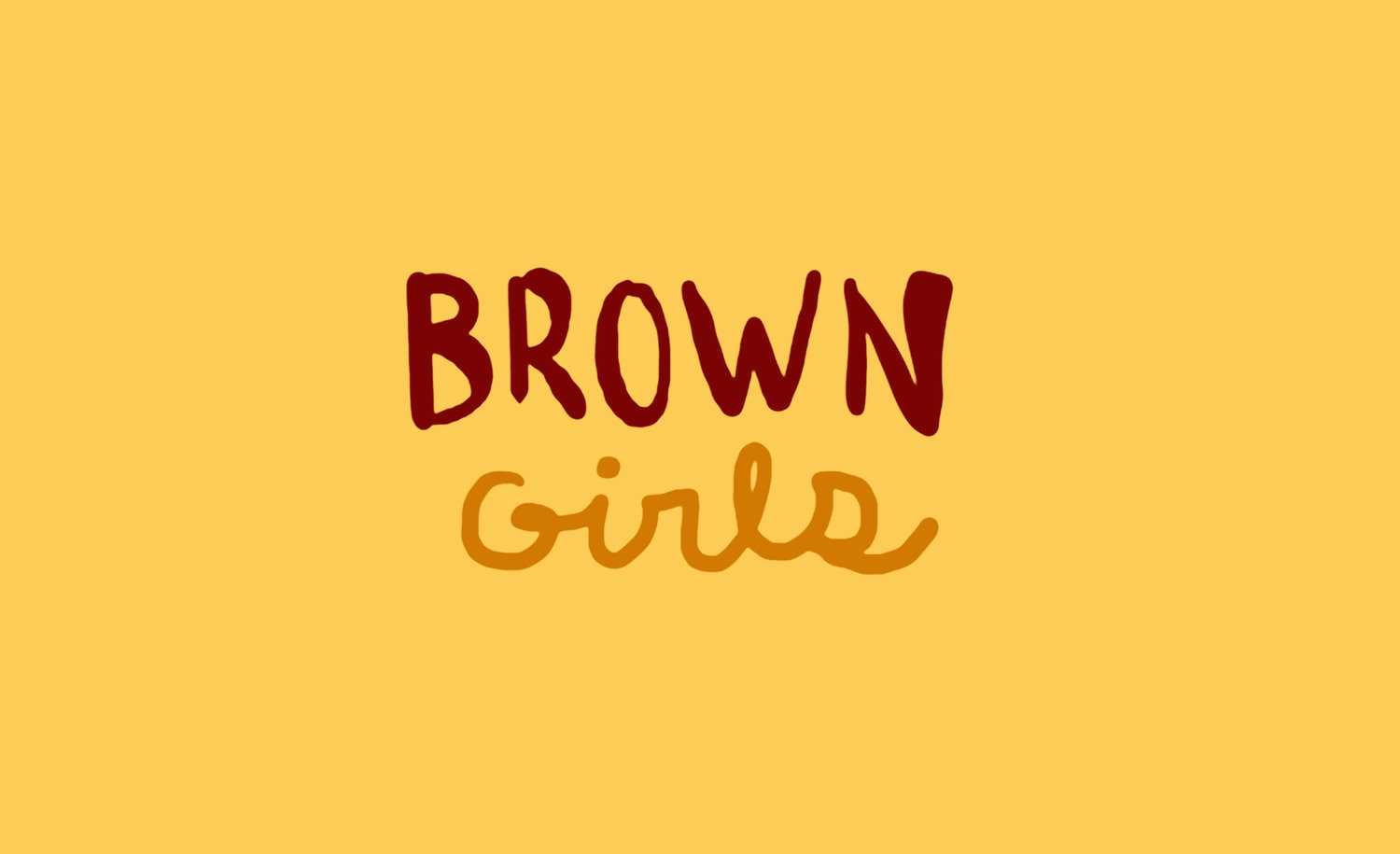
- Created by: Fatimah Asghar
- Written by: Fatimah Asghar
- Directed by: Sam Bailey
- Starring: Nabila Hossain; Sonia Denis; Melissa DuPrey; Lily Mojekwu; Rashaad Hall; Odinaka Malachi Ezeokoli; Minita Gandhi; LaNisa Renee Frederick; Natasha Forouzannia; Aasia Bullock
- Theme music composer: Jamila Woods; Lisa Mishra; Dee Lilly
- Country of origin: United States
- Original language: English
- No. of seasons: 1
- No. of episodes: 7

Original release
- Network: Open TV
- Release: February 15, 2017

Brown Girls is an American comedy web series created by Fatimah Asghar and Sam Bailey. It follows two friends, Leila and Patricia, who pursue their dreams in Chicago.

== Premise ==
Two women of color, Leila and Patricia, a queer Pakistani-American writer and an African-American musician respectively, lean on each other to get through the difficulties of their mid-twenties.

== Episodes ==
Episode One – The series opens with Leila getting a call from her Aunty Bushra, who berates her for forgetting to say Eid Mubarak, and asks her if she is having sex which she denies even though Miranda is naked in her bed. As Leila is brushing her teeth Miranda confronts Leila about the state of their relationship as she is frustrated by the lack of commitment on Leila’s end, and they break up. Patricia tells Leila that it is for the best since Miranda never understood how to be in a casual relationship.

Episode Two – Patricia tells her booty-call, Jason, to leave her house as she does not want him to spend the night after they have had sex. Jason encourages her to let him stay over but to no avail. The next day, Patricia has lunch with her mother. They discuss Patricia’s past relationship with Brendon and her mother’s failing relationship with her father.

Episode Three – Leila’s sister Musarrat is visiting her from New York. They discuss the trials and tribulations of Leila’s career as a writer, as well as within her love life. Leila comes out as queer and her sister accepts her. They agree not to tell Bushra Aunty as she would disown her.

Episode Four – Leila, Patricia and Vic go to a party where they run into Miranda with her date, Jessica. Leila gets drunk and insults Jessica. The confrontation between Leila, Miranda and Jessica escalates as Leila asserts that Miranda would rather be with her than with Jessica. It culminates with Leila punching Jessica.

Episode Five – Patricia is working as a bar-tender on a slow day. Jason comes in with his date, Vanessa, and he acts like he has never met Patricia. Patricia tells Vanessa that she slept with Jason two days ago which causes her to leave. Jason and Patricia argue in the bar. Patricia’s colleague, Stacey, says that Patricia is always bringing her personal issues to work and that she will be informing the owner.

Episode Six – Leila, Patricia, and Vic go to brunch and discuss the recent events. Leila says she wants Miranda back but that she is still unsure and afraid to come out. Patricia says she is not interested in Jason and only told Vanessa that they slept together because she had the right to know. She says that after her last relationship where she became completely engrossed in Brendon and did not focus on her music career, she wants to now focus on herself.

Episode Seven – Leila goes to Miranda’s house and says she wants her back. She says that during their conversation in the bathroom (ep 1) she was just scared but she is not anymore. Miranda asserts that if she truly wants her back, she expects Leila to fight for her and they kiss. Patricia calls her mother and initially says she quit her job because it was too stifling but later reveals that she was fired. Her mother agrees to give her some money. Patricia tells Leila that she hasn’t sang publicly in a year and that everyone she knows in the music industry is a connection she made through Brendon. Leila assures her that they will make it work regardless.

== Development and production ==
Directed by Sam Bailey and written by Fatimah Asghar, the series was inspired by Asghar's 10-year-long friendship with singer Jamila Woods. Scripting began in the fall of 2015, and Bailey joined the project after a public reading in early 2016. Founder of Open TV Aymar Jean Christian added the project to the web platform's slate. Filming took place in Chicago's Pilsen neighborhood. The entirety of the onscreen cast are people of colour as well as much of the production team. Over 40% of the funding for the show was crowd sourced and the rest was provided by Open TV, and a grant from the Chicago Digital Media Production Fund.

== Reception ==
The series debuted on Elle.com on February 15, 2017. There were also screenings across 15 cities including London, Lahore, and Williamstown. It attracted immediate attention from HBO, Comedy Central and TBS. HBO put the series into development in June 2017. The show was praised by The Atlantic for having a novel vision of femininity in its representation of matriarchal families, as well as in its centring of women of colour.

The series was nominated for the Primetime Emmy Award for Outstanding Short Form Comedy or Drama Series. The show was nominated in the "Drama" and "Indie" categories at the 7th Streamy Awards and won in the former category.
