= Idwal Jones (novelist) =

American writer

- Born: December 8, 1887; Ffestiniog, Wales
- Died: November 14, 1964 (aged 73); Laguna Beach, California
- Occupation: Writer (novelist)
- Spouse: Olive Vere Wolf (m. 1923)
- Writing career
- Period: 20th century
- Genres: History, fiction

Idwal Jones (/ˈiːdwəl/ EED-wəl; December 8, 1887 – November 14, 1964) was a Welsh-American novelist and non-fiction writer. Jones focused a lot of his writing on the beauty and population boom in California and the west.

== Biography ==
Jones was born in Ffestiniog, Wales, to William W. Jones and Mary Catherine Hughes. His father was an engineer and geologist who in 1902 brought the family to the slate-quarrying region of Pennsylvania. He studied mechanical engineering in New York, which led to an interest in the California gold rush, and he moved to there in 1911. He began his literary career writing book reviews for the San Francisco Chronicle, and later had his own columns in, The San Francisco Examiner "Rediscovering San Francisco" and "Passing By." He sold his first short story in the 1920s. He won a Newbery Medal Honor in 1937 for Whistler's Van.

Some of his most famous works include: The Vineyard and Ark of Empire: San Francisco's Montgomery Block.

The Vineyard tells the story of Napa Valley citizens and their love for the land. The main character, Alda Pendle, mastered the art of viticulture from her father. After her father's death, Pendle's skills make her a valuable asset to an individual living on a vineyard in Napa Valley.

Ark of Empire: San Francisco's Montgomery Block, subtitled "San Francisco's Unique Bohemia 1853–1953" in one edition, is a history of the old heart of San Francisco.

His first novel, The Splendid Shilling, came out in 1926, with a storyline that mirrored his own, shifting from Wales to California during the Gold Rush. He married Olive Vere Wolf in 1923, and they traveled the world together. Jones died at his home in Laguna Beach, California.
