= Fatimah Asghar =

American poet

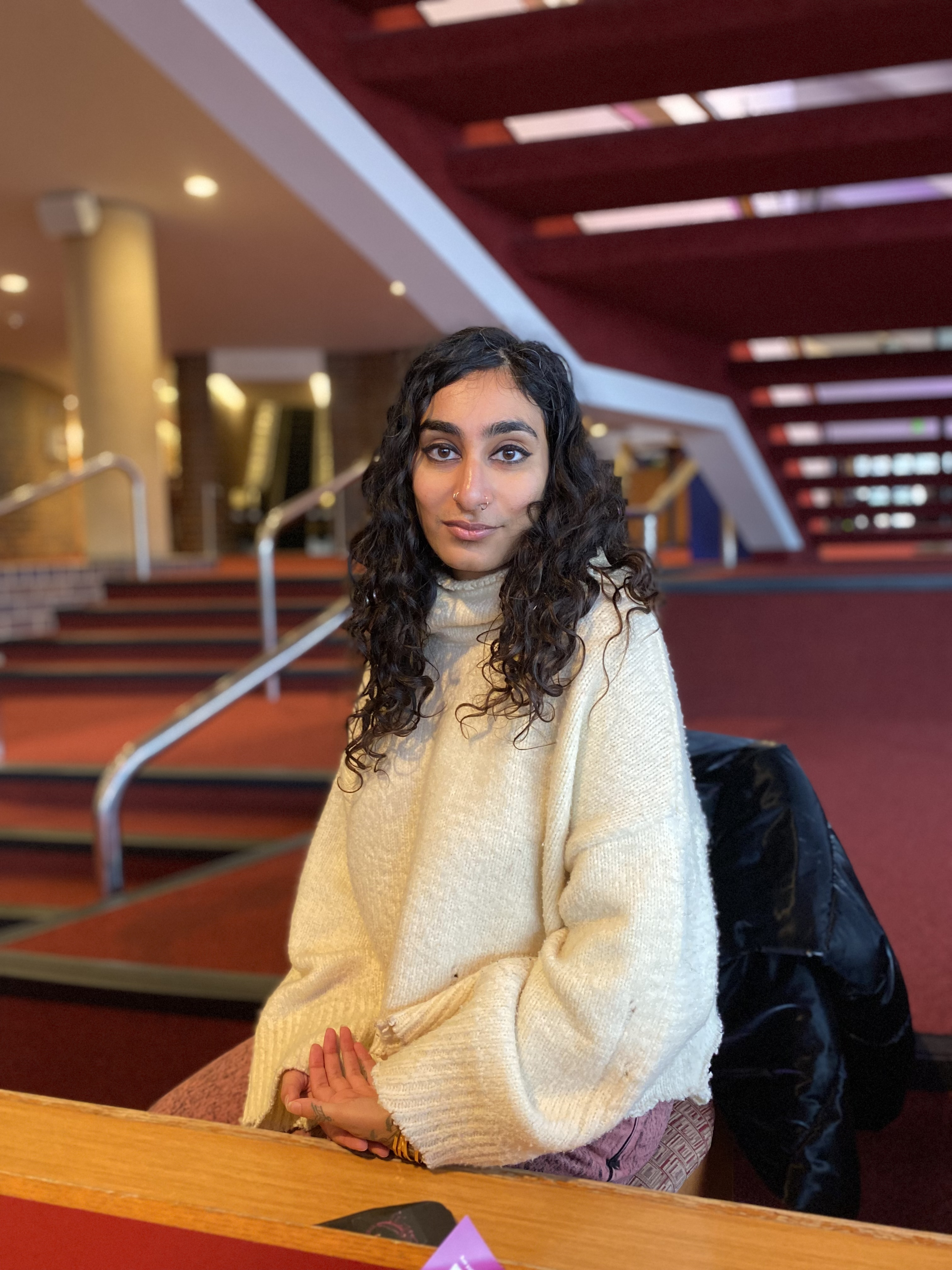
- Occupation: Poet, screenwriter
- Awards: Kundiman Fellowship; Carol Shields Prize for Fiction (When We Were Sisters, 2023)
- Website: www.fatimahasghar.com

Fatimah Asghar is an American poet, director and screenwriter. Co-creator and writer for the Emmy-nominated webseries Brown Girls, their work has appeared in Poetry, Gulf Coast, BuzzFeed Reader, The Margins, The Offing, Academy of American Poets, and other publications.

Asghar is a member of the Dark Noise Collective and a Kundiman Fellow. They received the Ruth Lilly and Dorothy Sargent Rosenberg Poetry Fellowship from the Poetry Foundation in 2017, and has been featured on the Forbes 30 Under 30 list.

== Early life ==
Asghar's mother was from Jammu and Kashmir and fled with their family during Partition related violence. Their father was from Pakistan. Their parents immigrated to the United States. They both died by the time Asghar was five, leaving them an orphan. "As an orphan, something I learned was that I could never take love for granted, so I would actively build it," they told HelloGiggles in 2018.

Asghar's identity as an orphan is a major theme in their work, their poem "How'd Your Parents Die Again?" opens with the lines:

Again? As though I told you how the first time. Everyone always tries to theft, bring them back out the grave. In their poem "Super Orphan," Asghar once again explores the impact of their absence.

Woke up, parents still

dead. Outside, the leaves yawn,

re-christen themselves as spring.

Asghar attended Brown University, where they majored in International Relations and Africana Studies. It was not until they were in college that Asghar learned about how the Partition of India had deeply impacted their family. Their uncle described how the family was forced to leave Kashmir for Lahore and told them about the impact of being refugees in a new land affected their family. Learning about their family's firsthand experience during partition had a profound effect on Asghar and their work. ""I've been constantly thinking about it, and looking back into it and trying to understand exactly what happened," they said in 2018.

Along with their orphanhood, the legacy of Partition is another major theme in their poetry. "Partition is always going to be a thing that matters to me and influences me," they once said. "When your people have gone through such historical violence, you cannot shake it."

== Brown Girls ==
In 2017, Asghar and Sam Bailey released their web series Brown Girls. Written by Asghar and directed by Bailey, the series is based on Asghar's friendship with the artist Jamila Woods and their experiences as two women of color navigating their twenties. The two main characters are a queer Pakistani-American writer and an African-American musician and are played by Nabila Hossain and Sonia Denis respectively.

"Often, our friends joke that we are each other's life partners, or 'real wifeys.'" Asghar told NBC News of their friendship with Woods. "And in a lot of ways we are. Jamila gets me through everything. She's seen me at my worst, at my best, at my most insecure — everything."

Brown Girls received an Emmy nomination in 2017 in the Outstanding Short Form Comedy or Drama Series category.

== Works ==
- After (YesYes Books, 2015)
- If They Come for Us (One World/Random House, 2018)
- Halal if You Hear Me, co-edited with Safia Elhillo (Haymarket Books, 2019)
- When We Were Sisters (One World/ Random House, 2022)
- Daughter of the Mountains (One World/Random House, 2026)

== Awards ==
In 2011 Asghar was awarded a Fulbright fellowship to Bosnia & Herzegovina. Asghar was nominated for the Young Lions Fiction Award for When We Were Sisters. The novel won the inaugural Carol Shields Prize for Fiction in 2023. Their poetry collection If They Come for Us was nominated for the 2019 Lambda Literary Award for Bisexual Poetry. They were a recipient of the Ruth Lilly and Dorothy Sargent Rosenberg Poetry Fellowship from the poetry Foundation in 2017.
