= Justin Torres =

American novelist (born 1980)

- Torres at AWP 2025
- Born: 1980 (age 45–46); New York City, U.S.
- Education: New York University; The New School; University of Iowa
- Occupations: Novelist, writer
- Writing career
- Notable works: We the Animals (2011); Blackouts (2023)
- Notable awards: First Novelist Award; National Book Award for Fiction
- Website: www.justin-torres.com

Justin Torres (born 1980) is an American novelist and an associate professor of English at University of California, Los Angeles. He won the First Novelist Award for his semi-autobiographical debut novel We the Animals (2011), which was also an Edmund White Award finalist and an NAACP Image Award for Debut Author nominee. The novel has been adapted into a film of the same title and was awarded the Next Innovator Prize at the Sundance Film Festival. Torres's second novel, Blackouts, won the 2023 National Book Award for Fiction.

== Early life ==
Justin Torres was born to a father of Puerto Rican descent and a mother of Italian and Irish descent. He was raised in Baldwinsville, New York, as the youngest of three brothers. Although his novel We the Animals is not an autobiography, Torres has said that the "hard facts" in the novel mirror his own life. City of God by Gil Cuadros, published in 1994, reportedly helped him to come out as gay. After leaving his family home, Torres attended SUNY Purchase on scholarship but quickly dropped out. He spent a few years of moving around in the country and taking whatever job came, until a friend invited him to sit in a writing course taught at The New School, which motivated him to start writing seriously.

== Career ==
In 2010, Torres received his master's degree from the Iowa Writers' Workshop. He was a 2010–2012 Stegner Fellow at Stanford University. He was a recipient of the Rolón Fellowship in Literature from United States Artists. In the summer of 2016, Torres was the Picador Guest Professor for Literature at the University of Leipzig's Institute for American Studies in Leipzig, Germany. He is a former dog walker and a former employee of McNally Jackson, a bookstore in Manhattan. Torres is currently an associate professor of English at the University of California, Los Angeles.

He has published short fiction for The New Yorker, Granta, Harper's, Tin House, Glimmer Train, The Washington Post, and other publications, as well as non-fiction for The Advocate and The Guardian.

A film adaptation of We the Animals, directed by Jeremiah Zagar, premiered in 2018 at the Sundance Film Festival, where it won the Next Innovator Prize.

== Awards and honors ==
Torres's first novel, We the Animals (Houghton Mifflin Harcourt, 2011), won an Indies Choice Book Awards (Adult Debut Honor Award) and was also a Publishing Triangle Award finalist and an NAACP Image Award nominee (Outstanding Literary Work, Debut Author). The novel also won the 2012 First Novelist Award.

Torres was named by Salon.com as one of the sexiest men of 2011. In 2012, the National Book Foundation named him among their "5 Under 35" young fiction writers.

His 2023 novel Blackouts, a historical fiction dealing with queer identity and suppression of LGBT culture, won the 2023 National Book Award for Fiction and was shortlisted for the 2024 Lambda Literary Award for Gay Fiction and the 2024 Orwell Prize for Political Fiction. In 2025, the novel made longlist for the International Dublin Literary Award.

Torres received a Guggenheim Fellowship in 2024.

== Works ==
=== Novels ===
- —— (2011). We the Animals (hardcover 1st ed.). Boston: Houghton Mifflin Harcourt. ISBN 9780547576725.
- —— (2023). Blackouts (hardcover 1st ed.). New York: Macmillan. ISBN 9780374293574.

=== Short stories ===
- "Lessons". Granta. 104. November 20, 2008.
- "Reverting to a Wild State". The New Yorker. August 1, 2011.
- "Starve a Rat". Harper's Magazine. October 2011.
- "In the Reign of King Moonracer". The Washington Post. November 15, 2013.
- "Dark Mother". Dismantle: An Anthology of Writing from the Vona/Voices Writing Workshop (paperback 1st ed.). Philadelphia: Thread Makes Blanket Press. 2014. ISBN 9780989747417.
- "Where's My Wild Horse, Come to Rescue Me?". Flaunt. 125.

=== Articles ===
- "Breaking the Ice: What Russia's Queer Past Has to Tell Us About the Future". Out. September 3, 2013.
- "The James Baldwin Message for Trans People". The Advocate. November 7, 2013.
- "Derek Jarman's Alternative to The New Gay Credo". The Advocate. March 13, 2014.
- "In Praise of Latin Night at the Queer Club". The Washington Post. June 13, 2016.
- "Dog-Walking for a Wealthy Narcissist". The New Yorker. Vol. 92, no. 32. October 10, 2016. p. 60.
- "The Rust Belt Whips and Snaps After Eight Years of Obama". The Washington Post. January 13, 2017.
- "Supportive Acts". Bomb Magazine. September 7, 2017.
- "The Sordid Necessity of Living for Others". The New Yorker. November 6, 2018.
