= Idwal Jones (writer) =

Richard Idwal Mervyn Jones (8 June 1895 – 18 May 1937) was a Welsh schoolmaster, poet and dramatist.

Jones was born at Rhoslwyn, Lampeter, the son of D. Teifi Jones, a well-known local politician and eisteddfodwr. Following army service during the First World War, Idwal Jones entered the University College of Wales, Aberystwyth, where he met D. Gwenallt Jones, who would later write his biography. After graduating, he became a schoolteacher at Devil's Bridge.

== Works ==
=== Plays ===
- Pobl yr Ymylon (1927)
- P'un (1927)
- Yr Anfarwol Ifan Harris (1928)
- Sh — ! Dim Swn (1936)
- Yr Eosiaid (1936)

=== Poetry ===
- Cerddi Digri a Rhai Pethau Eraill (1934)
- Cerddi Digri Newydd a Phethau o'r Fath (1937)
- Ystorïau a Pharodïau (1944)
