= Ice Bucket Challenge =

2014 viral internet challenge and fundraiser

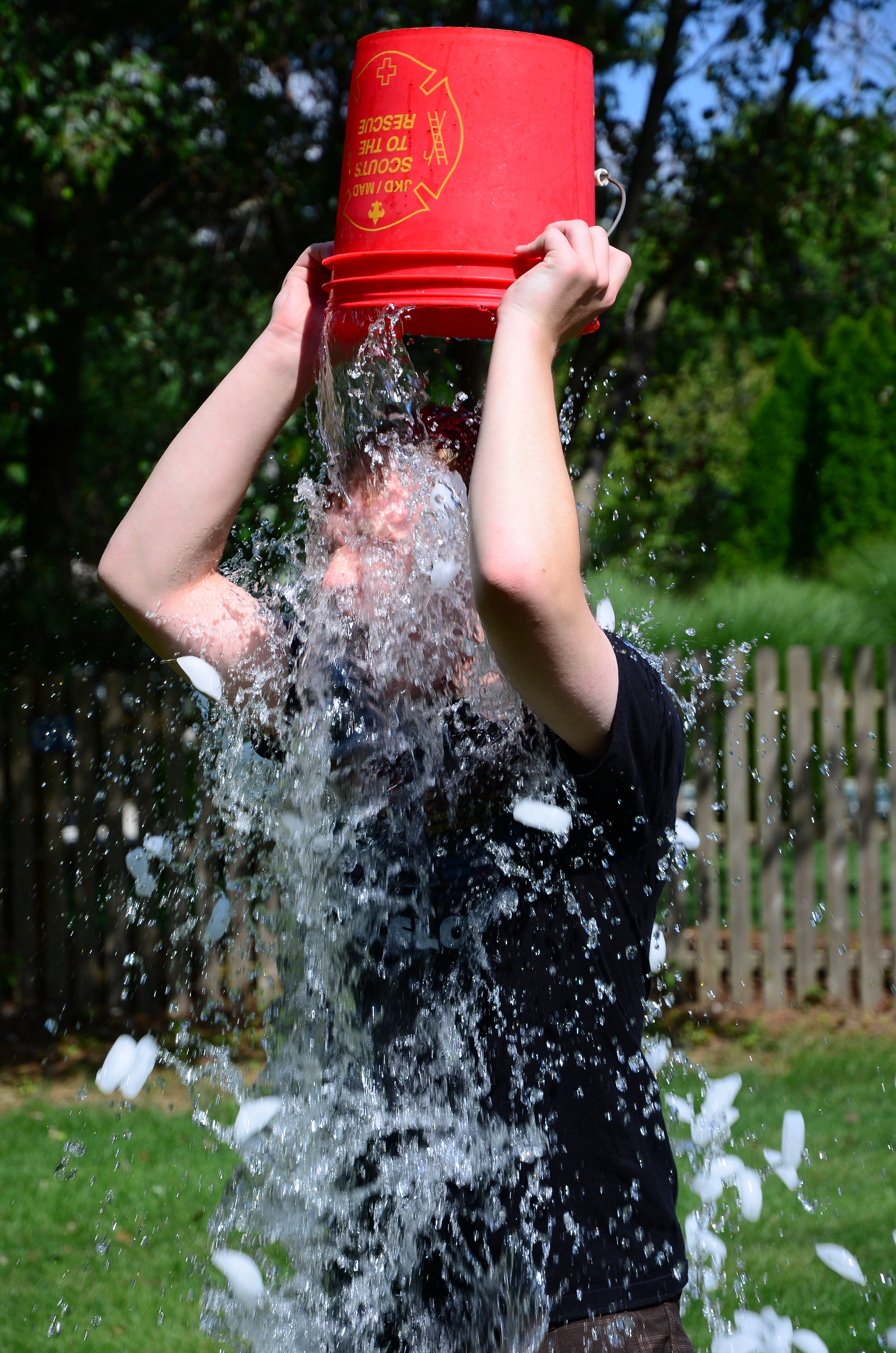
A person performing the ALS Ice Bucket Challenge

The Ice Bucket Challenge, sometimes called the ALS Ice Bucket Challenge, is an activity involving the pouring of a bucket of ice water over a person's head, either by another person or self-administered, to promote awareness of the disease amyotrophic lateral sclerosis (ALS, also known as motor neuron disease or Lou Gehrig's disease) and encourage donations to research. The challenge was co-founded by Pat Quinn and Pete Frates; it went viral on social media during July–August 2014. In the United States, many people participated for the ALS Association, and in the United Kingdom, many people participated for the Motor Neurone Disease Association, although some individuals opted to donate their money from the Ice Bucket Challenge to other organizations.

The challenge encourages nominated participants to be filmed having a bucket of ice water poured on their heads and then nominating others to do the same. A common stipulation is that nominated participants have 24 hours to comply or forfeit by way of a charitable financial donation, though doing both was encouraged.

On August 1, 2015, a group of ALS organizations in the United States, including the ALS Association, Les Turner ALS Foundation, and ALS Therapy Development Institute, re-introduced the Ice Bucket Challenge for 2015 to raise further funds with the intention of establishing it as an annual occurrence. It failed to raise the same viral attention as the original event, which raised over $115m worldwide for the disease in 2014 alone. However some people—including celebrities and various government officials around the world—have followed through with the intention of a yearly event by continuing to perform the challenge again each subsequent summer.

== History ==
=== Predecessors ===
From 1991 to early 2014, a challenge of unknown origin often called the "Cold Water Challenge" became popular on social media in areas of the Northern United States and Northern Norway. The task usually involved the option of either donating money to cancer research or having to jump into cold water. In Norway the penalty for refusal could also be having to purchase alcoholic drinks for others. According to the Wall Street Journal, the Ice Bucket Challenge was begun by professional golfers as means to support various pet charities.

One version of the challenge, which took place in Salem, Indiana, as early as May 15, 2014, involved dousing participants with cold water and then donating to a charity, for example a local child diagnosed with an inoperable brain tumor. In another version, the Auckland Division of the Cancer Society of New Zealand was the beneficiary. As with similar challenges, it was usually filmed so footage can be shared online.

The National Fallen Firefighters Foundation popularized the "Cold Water Challenge" in early 2014 to raise funds as an unsanctioned spin-off of the polar plunge most widely used by Special Olympics as a fundraiser.

On May 20, 2014, the Washington Township, New Jersey, fire department posted a video on YouTube participating in the "Cold Water Challenge" with fire hoses. Participating members of the department were subsequently punished for using fire department equipment without permission.

Soon after, the challenge was brought to mainstream audiences when television anchor Matt Lauer did what was called "the Ice Bucket Challenge" on July 15, 2014, on NBC's The Today Show at Greg Norman's challenge. Lauer was raising money for the Hospice of Palm Beach County.

=== Shifting focus to ALS ===
Atlanta Falcons players, coaches, and staff take the Ice Bucket Challenge.

In the Summer 2015 edition of the ALS Association's internet magazine "Visions" was an article in which it was asserted that "it all started in Florida with a golfer named Chris Kennedy. When Kennedy took the challenge in mid-July last year, the then little-known stunt was not tied to a specific charity. Kennedy thought taking the challenge might bring some cheer to a family member with ALS, Anthony Senerchia." Next, Kennedy nominated Senerchia's wife. Soon, news of the stunt traveled to Pat Quinn, of Yonkers, NY, according to "Visions". Within two weeks, word then reached Quinn's friend Pete Frates and he took the challenge, making him the fourth person to complete the challenge for ALS. During a Boston TV interview on September 2, 2019, Frates' father implied that his family knew so much about the disease, that "he felt like he was the Nostradamus of ALS". The challenge first received increased media attention in the United States on June 30, 2014, when personalities of the Golf Channel program Morning Drive televised the social-media phenomenon, and performed a live, on-air Ice Bucket Challenge.

On the same day, golfer Chris Kennedy did the challenge, then challenged his cousin Jeanette Senerchia of Pelham, New York, whose husband, Anthony, had ALS for 11 years. Kennedy's challenge was the first documented instance of the challenge being connected with ALS. At this time, the challenge was not connected directly with ALS. Participants would donate to a charity of their choice.

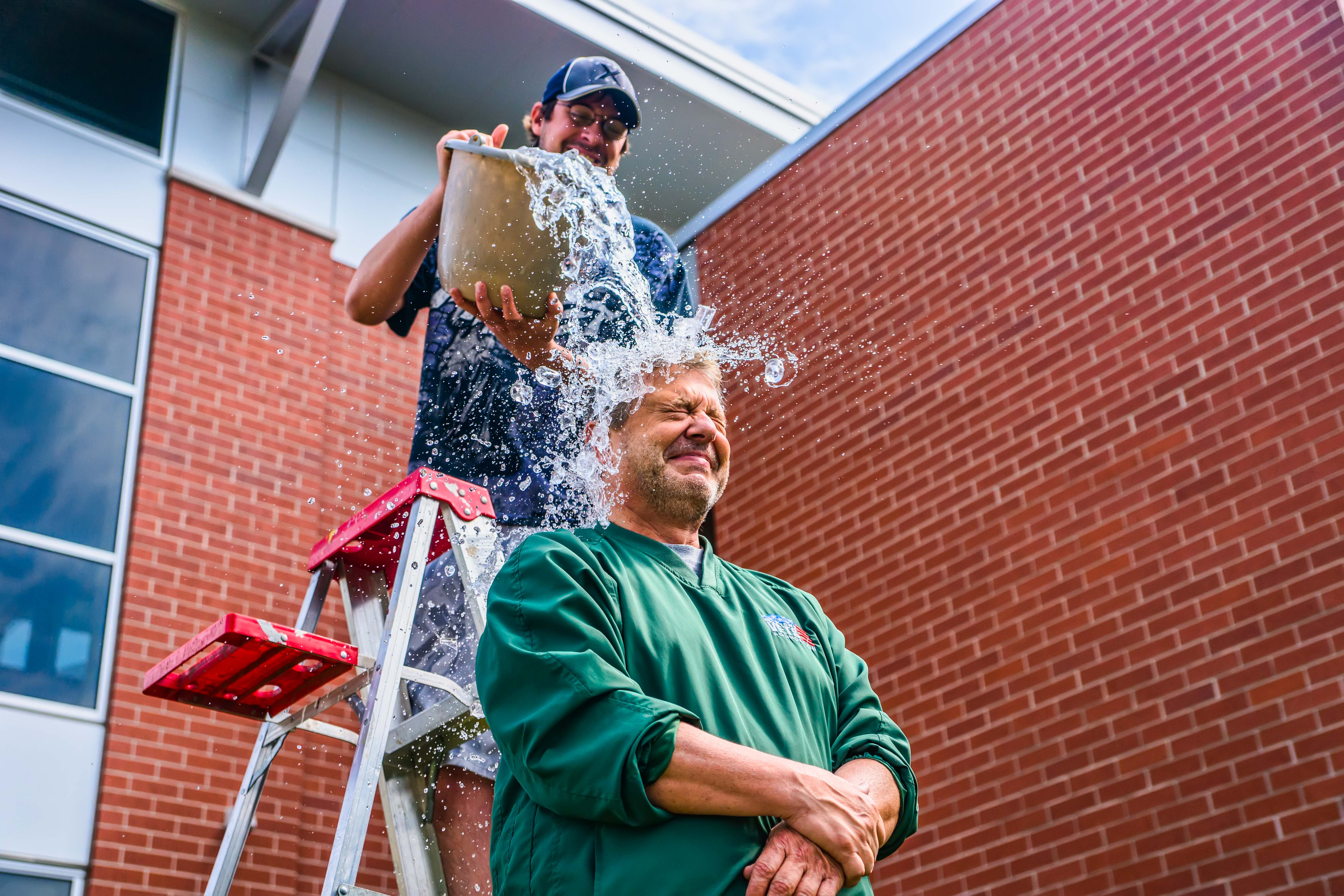
Green Bay local radio and TV personality John Maino performs the ALS Ice Bucket Challenge.

Pat Quinn, who was friends on Facebook with the Senerchias, encouraged his friends to take the challenge, and soon after, Pete Frates began posting about the challenge on Twitter. Frates was awarded the Stephen Heywood Patients Today Award in 2012 for his fundraising and advocacy work. Frates' Boston College and sporting connections became an initial focus of the challenge and strengthened its focus on ALS. Both Quinn and Frates did the challenge in support of the ALS Therapy Development Institute. After its initial start with Pete Frates, a minor league baseball player diagnosed with the disease in 2012, the movement went viral in the Boston area which showed a much higher number of posts than any other area of the United States.

In his video, Stephen Hawking declined to perform the challenge due to pneumonia the year before; however, his three children took the challenge for him.

The President of the United States, Barack Obama, was challenged by Ethel Kennedy as well as by businessman and future successor to the presidency Donald Trump but declined, opting to contribute to the campaign with a donation of $100. Justin Bieber, LeBron James, and "Weird Al" Yankovic also challenged President Obama after completing the Ice Bucket Challenge. Hirohiko Araki, creator of the manga series JoJo's Bizarre Adventure, created a YouTube channel and uploaded only one video, which was an Ice Bucket Challenge video. Former President George W. Bush completed the challenge and nominated fellow former President Bill Clinton. The Prime Minister of the United Kingdom, David Cameron, was challenged by both Alex Salmond and Russell Brand, but also declined in favor of a donation.

Peter Frates died on December 9, 2019, at his home in Beverly, Massachusetts, at the age of 34.

=== The challenge's success ===
The Ice Bucket Challenge raised over $220m worldwide. Its combination of competitiveness, social media pressure, online narcissism, and low barriers to entry led to more than 2.4 million tagged videos circulating Facebook. Even though 40–50% of the new donors were likely to make one-time gifts only, the challenge instigated large numbers of people, videos, and donations. The challenge also benefited from a unique balance of mass interest and individual identification. In using social media as its platform, it accessed many people worldwide; in having its participants individually identify potential candidates – calling them out by "tagging" them – it felt personal. Furthermore, the videos were often entertaining. The average participants kept their videos under a minute, requiring limited commitment from any viewers. Another concept the Challenge benefited from was its ripple effect, inspiring features for articles, such as The Guardian's "10 More of the Best Celebrity Takes on the Ice Bucket Challenge." Despite its marketing success, critics suggested that the ease of repeating the challenge's spiel does not increase awareness of what the disease actually does and who it is so harmful to.

The success of the challenge prompted the Muscular Dystrophy Association, which also raises funds to combat ALS, to discontinue its long-running annual telethon, the MDA Show of Strength, after the 2014 edition, stating that the Ice Bucket Challenge had prompted the MDA to reevaluate how it can connect with the public.

In 2017, Frates published a book about the Ice Bucket Challenge detailing his own experience with ALS as well as his involvement in the social movement. Half of the proceeds were to go to the Frates family.

=== Revivals ===
==== 2015 ====
On August 1, 2015, a group of ALS organizations in the United States, including the ALS Association, relaunched the Ice Bucket Challenge for 2015. The group said they intended to rerun the campaign "this August, and every August, until there's a cure (for ALS)". "We have to finish what started last summer: every August until there's a cure," said Barb Newhouse, President and CEO of the ALS Association.

The 2015 campaign received the support of Major League Baseball, with each club due to organise its own branch of the Challenge and then nominate another franchise, along with two other local organizations or personalities, to participate in the Challenge. "We are so thrilled and grateful to have every Major League Baseball team supporting us this year," commented Frates.

Celebrity participants in the 2015 challenge included Massachusetts governor Charlie Baker who took the challenge while wearing a "Free Brady" T-shirt (calling for the lifting of the suspension given to Tom Brady of the New England Patriots over Deflategate), Bieber once again, actor Hugh Jackman (belatedly in early September 2015) and actress Renee Zellweger who, in response to criticisms of the challenge for wasting water in drought conditions, used water from a drinking trough in a horse stables while standing in the trough to ensure every last drop was recycled back into its original source. President Barack Obama also received another nomination, this time by former New Orleans Saints player Steve Gleason (himself diagnosed with ALS). Republican presidential candidate Donald Trump, despite having done the challenge in 2014, turned down his 2015 nomination from Boston mayor Marty Walsh, labelling Walsh "a clown" and suggesting that Boston "get a new mayor".

In the UK, the MND Association declined to revive the challenge. "We felt we raised a significant amount of money and awareness last summer. While people might be keen to do it again, we wouldn't say please do it again," said Chris James, the Association's director of external affairs. Instead, the Association ran a "Last Summer" campaign commemorating the efforts of the public with the challenge, including the testimonies of those with ALS. Despite the reluctance of the MND Association, the cast of soap opera Hollyoaks nonetheless performed the challenge, nominating the cast of another soap, Casualty. Eddie Redmayne, having been nominated by Zellweger, also accepted the challenge for a second year, filming his video in London and nominating Charlie Cox, who did his 2015 challenge in New York. An attempt at the world record for the largest number of people simultaneously performing the challenge took place September 6, 2015, in Tewkesbury as part of a fundraiser for child bereavement charity Winton's Wish. In the event, the world record of 428 remained untouched but a new UK record of 248 people was set. TV presenter Eamonn Holmes performed the challenge in early October on This Morning after announcing he would do so while hosting the Pride of Britain Awards a few days earlier.

By early October, it was reported that the 2015 challenge had raised $500,000 as compared with the $115 million raised by the 2014 challenge. The final figure was reported by the ALS Association in mid-October as being $1,000,000, with a survey by health analysts Treato showing that only 14% of donors from 2014 donated again in 2015.

==== 2016–2019 ====
Australian Deputy Prime Minister Barnaby Joyce performed the challenge in 2016, nominating his colleague Michael McCormack, the Minister for Small Business. Fellow Australian MP Adam Marshall also performed the challenge. A new variant on the challenge this year, the "What's In Your Bucket?" challenge, featured the replacement of the ice cubes with other substances, including tomato ketchup, spaghetti, pickles, beer, baby powder, coffee, and sand. A further attempt on the world record for the largest mass Ice Bucket Challenge in Buffalo, New York drew 650 participants, 71 short of the existing record of 721.

Charlie Baker, governor of Massachusetts, formalized the annual challenge by signing a bill declaring the first week of August each year to be Ice Bucket Challenge Week. MND South Australia held an Ice Bucket Challenge campaign in February (during the Southern hemispheric summer) Pete Frates' family joined with the Beverly Police Department to hold an Ice Bucket Challenge event on August 27 in which family members and officers took part. In 2016, the Motor Neurone Disease New Zealand Association Inc (later to become the Motor Neurone Disease New Zealand Charitable Trust) promoted the ice-bucket challenge which raised NZ$35,000.

In June 2018 in Seoul, South Korea the Challenge raised funds to build Korea's first dedicated hospital for ALS patients. The Empire City Casino in Yonkers announced it would hold a Challenge event for the fifth year running. Political participants this year included Massachusetts State Senator Joan Lovely.

A fifth anniversary commemorative mass Ice Bucket Challenge was held at Copley Square in Boston, Massachusetts, with Frates and state governor Charlie Baker in attendance. ALS Canada's staff's annual commemorative performance of the Ice Bucket Challenge also reached its fifth year to end the Ice Bucket Challenge.

==== 2020–2024 ====
The 2021 and 2022 annual Yonkers Ice Bucket Challenge events were dedicated to the memory of Pat Quinn, with the latter held on July 31 (in spite of the "Every August ..." slogan). By this point the Empire City Casino had held an Ice Bucket Challenge event every year since 2015 except 2020 on account of the COVID-19 pandemic.

==== 2025–present ====
In 2025, a student club at the University of South Carolina revived the Ice Bucket Challenge, with many videos going viral on TikTok and Instagram. The MIND club (Mental Illness Needs Discussion) launched the challenge to combat mental health stigmas and advocate for suicide prevention. All the proceeds for this challenge go to the non-profit mental health organization Active Minds. As of April 16, 2026, the campaign has raised $439,596 of a $500,000 goal. It has received support from public figures such as Zach King, Peyton Manning, Scarlett Johansson, and James Charles. In June 2026, content creator Hunter Mecum reemerged the challenge to support former NFL running back Chris Johnson, after his diagnosis with the disease. In July 2026, a number of professional wrestlers including multi-time women’s champion Gail Kim, revived the challenge in support of former All Elite Wrestling (AEW) wrestler Rebel. During the July 30, 2026 episode of AEW Collision, The Conglomeration (Orange Cassidy, Kyle O'Reilly, and Roderick Strong) participated in an ice bucket challenge and were joined by the Detroit-based hip-hop group Insane Clown Posse and Rhino who assisted in dousing the trio.

== Rules ==
Then Governor of South Carolina Nikki Haley does the ALS Ice Bucket Challenge.

Matt Damon did the challenge with toilet water to also promote access to safe drinking water and sanitation.

Within 24 hours of being challenged, participants have to record a video of themselves in continuous footage. First, they are to announce their acceptance of the challenge, followed by pouring ice into a bucket of water. Then, the bucket is to be lifted and poured over the participant's head. Then the participant can nominate a minimum of three other people to participate in the challenge.

Whether people choose to donate, perform the challenge, or do both varies.

In one version of the challenge, the participant was expected to donate $10 if they poured the ice water over their head or donate $100 if they did not. In another version, dumping the ice water over the participant's head was done in lieu of any donation, which led to some criticisms of the challenge being a form of "slacktivism". Many participants donated $100 in addition to doing the challenge.

== Impact ==
=== Awareness ===
In mid-2014, the Ice Bucket Challenge went viral on social media, particularly in the United States, with people, celebrities, politicians and athletes posting videos of themselves online and on TV participating in the event. According to The New York Times, people shared more than 1.2 million videos on Facebook between June 1 and August 13 and mentioned the phenomenon more than 2.2 million times on Twitter between July 29 and August 17. At its peak, the challenge generated more than 70,000 tweets per day with hashtags such as #IceBucketChallenge, #ALSIceBucketChallenge, and #StrikeOutALS. Mashable called the phenomenon "the Harlem Shake of the summer".

Prior to the challenge, public awareness of the disease amyotrophic lateral sclerosis (ALS) was relatively limited; the ALS Association stated that prior to the challenge going viral only half of Americans had heard of the disease, often referred to as "Lou Gehrig's disease", after baseball player Lou Gehrig, who publicly revealed his diagnosis in 1939. After the Ice Bucket Challenge went viral on social media, public awareness and charitable donations to ALS charities soared. Hits to the English Wikipedia's article on amyotrophic lateral sclerosis grew from an average of 163,300 views per month to 2.89 million views in August 2014, and similar increases occurred in the Spanish and German Wikipedias.

=== Donations ===
Within weeks of the challenge going viral, The New York Times reported that the ALS Association had received $41.8 million in donations from more than 739,000 new donors from July 29 until August 21, more than double the $19.4 million the association received during the year that ended January 31, 2013. On August 29, the ALS Association announced that their total donations since July 29 had exceeded $100 million. The ALS Association is just one of several ALS-related charities that have benefited from the challenge:

Organization	Additional funding reported
ALS Association	$220m
ALS Society of Canada	$26m
Motor Neurone Disease Association	£7m
ALS Therapy Development Institute	$4m
ALS Foundation Netherlands	€1m
Project ALS	$500k

While the Ice Bucket Challenge raised much in donations, studies show that the majority of participants did not actually donate. In the UK, one in every six people participated, but only ten percent of the participants donated, according to the Charities Aid Foundation. The percentage was higher in the U.S., but the majority still did not donate.

In July 2015, the Huffington Post reported on the ALS Association's summary of how the funds raised through the Ice Bucket Challenge were distributed. By percentage, 67% of all funds (about $77 million) went to research, 20% to patient and community services, 9% to public and professional education, 2% to additional fundraising, and 2% to external processing fees.

=== Research ===
On July 25, 2016, the ALS Association announced that, thanks in part to donations from the Ice Bucket Challenge, the University of Massachusetts Medical School has identified a third gene that is a cause for the disease. Project MinE, a global gene sequencing effort to identify genetic drivers of ALS, received $1 million from the challenge, allowing them to broaden the scope of their research to include new sources in new parts of the world. Having identified the link between the gene, NEK1, and ALS will allow for a new targeted gene for therapy development, as well as focused drug development.

=== Influences ===
Several other challenges have been created and publicised as a result of the publicity of the Ice Bucket Challenge. The My Tree Challenge is an activity launched in Kerala which consists of planting a tree sapling and challenging others to do so. The My Tree Challenge was preceded by a Book List Challenge, started by Facebook users, where users post a list of books that they have read and liked the most. The Rice Bucket Challenge, that started in India in late August 2014 and later spread to other South Asian nations, was also partly a response to the Ice Bucket Challenge's wastefulness of water. The "Pie In The Eye Challenge" challenges the nominated person to receive a pie in the face. One particular occurrence of this, the late 2016 Waitress Pie Challenge, was initiated by the cast of the musical Waitress to raise awareness of breast cancer. The Milk Bucket Challenge in which milk is poured over the nominated person, was organised in August 2015 by English dairy farmers to raise awareness of their financial plight. The Rubble Bucket Challenge, started by Jordanian comedian Mohammed Darwaza, involves dumping a bucket of sand and rocks over one's head. This challenge was further popularized by Palestinian journalist Aymal al Aloul, and aims to increase awareness of Gazans who have lost their homes in the ongoing conflict with Israel. The Love Bucket Challenge, started by Kerala newspaper Malayala Manorama encourages people to fill a bucket with items to donate to orphanages. The Kaapi Challenge uses coffee, and is a challenge done primarily by the Chennai Super Kings to commemorate the 375th anniversary of the city of Chennai.

== Criticism ==
A number of criticisms arose relating to the campaign, accusing it of being self-congratulatory, focusing primarily on fun rather than donating money to charity, and substituting a trivial activity for more genuine involvement in charitable activities. Writing in The Daily Telegraph, Willard Foxton described the challenge as "a middle-class wet T-shirt contest for armchair clicktivists", and the Evening Standard Magazine said that "it has become less about raising funds and all about showing off your star-pulling power".

On August 28, 2014, it was reported that the ALS Association had filed an application to trademark the term "ice bucket challenge", but the application was retracted amid criticism a day later.

=== Importance of the cause ===
William MacAskill, vice-president of Giving What We Can, an organization that advocates for people to engage in more effective altruism, was critical of the Ice Bucket Challenge, citing two chief objections. First, he claimed that the Ice Bucket Challenge resulted in "funding cannibalism": "for every $1 we raise, 50¢ would have been donated anyway". Relatedly, MacAskill claimed that the challenge encouraged moral licensing, whereby people who engage in one act they consider good may feel more licensed to engage in bad behavior. MacAskill's piece was met with considerable critical push-back, and he published a follow-up a few days later suggesting an Ice Bucket Challenge for causes he considered more important and cost-effective to support. Citing research from GiveWell, MacAskill gave the example of donating to the Against Malaria Foundation to end malaria. MacAskill's pieces were cited in Nonprofit Quarterly, and Boston Review.

Julia Belluz at Vox.com wrote a piece with similar criticisms, linking to MacAskill's piece. Belluz noted that funding for diseases was often not proportional to the number of deaths caused by the diseases. She also noted that donating to developing world health causes could provide much greater healthcare value than donating for the treatment of rare diseases, an observation that is common in the effective altruism movement.

In the BBC's More or Less podcast, economist Tim Harford discussed the Ice Bucket Challenge and how to select the best charities, referencing work by GiveWell. He himself participated in the Ice Bucket Challenge, donating to the Schistosomiasis Control Initiative. Ben Carter and Keith Moore wrote an article for the BBC News drawing on the arguments made in the podcast.

=== Use of donated funds ===
Retired professional wrestler Lance Storm declined the challenge despite being nominated twice, and posted a note on his official website stating that most of the money that is donated goes towards promotional and advertising of the ALS Association while the remaining amount (at most 25% of what is donated) "is going into the pockets of Big Pharma", which is already doing ALS research and is therefore inflating their already-high profits. Storm went on to comment that it would be better to actually help someone with ALS and donate money directly to ALS patients. The ALS Association responded to similar criticisms by saying that 79% of their annual budget went toward programs in the past year.

Members of the pro-life movement, such as Lila Rose of Live Action, criticised donations to the ALS Association, because it uses embryonic stem cells in its ALS research. Related organisations such as the Family Research Council suggested that people participating in the Ice Bucket Challenge instead donate money to Midwest Stem Cell Therapy Center, Mayo Clinic, and the John Paul II Medical Research Institute, all three of which run clinical trials with adult stem cells, rather than embryonic ones. The Archdiocese of Cincinnati, with its 113 schools also recommended individuals participating in the Ice Bucket Challenge to donate to such groups, but not to the ALS Association "saying the group's funding of embryonic stem cell research is 'in direct conflict with Catholic teaching'."

PETA criticized the ALS Association's Ice Bucket Challenge, saying that money raised through the fundraiser would be used to fund "archaic and painful tests on animals". Russell Simmons, Pamela Anderson, and Grimes, among other celebrities, also criticized the ALS Association's fundraiser for its support of animal testing. Anderson wrote on her Facebook page: "Trying to cure human diseases by relying on outdated and ineffective animal experiments isn't only cruel – it's a grave disservice to people who desperately need cures."

=== Focus on the stunt rather than donations ===
American stunt performer and TV personality Steve-O questioned the campaign, suggesting that celebrities' videos generally did not share donation information for ALS charities, and that the initial $15 million in funds was insignificant, given the star power of the celebrities participating. He noted that, of the videos he viewed, only Charlie Sheen and Bill Gates mentioned that the point is to donate money. A similar criticism was made by Jacob Davidson in Time Magazine and by Arielle Pardes in Vice.

=== Health risks ===
On August 22, 2014, Dr. Brian O'Neill, a physician at the Detroit Medical Center, warned that the challenge may have adverse health effects on participants, including potentially inducing a vagal response which might, for example, lead to unconsciousness in people taking blood pressure medications. A number of participants have sustained injuries, and at least one death has been indirectly linked to the challenge, as a result of injuries sustained unrelated to the dumping of ice water, with another death thought to be caused by a variation on the challenge, jumping feet first into ice water.

=== "Michael's Story" poster ===
"Michael's Story" was a campaign poster from the UK MND Association's summer 2015 "Last Summer" first anniversary campaign which featured Michael Smith. He had not taken part in the Ice Bucket Challenge and was subsequently diagnosed with motor neurone disease. This caused controversy, with some critics saying that the poster was implying that Smith had deserved his illness for his previous non-participation. The claims were strongly refuted by the Association and by Smith himself.

=== Waste of water ===
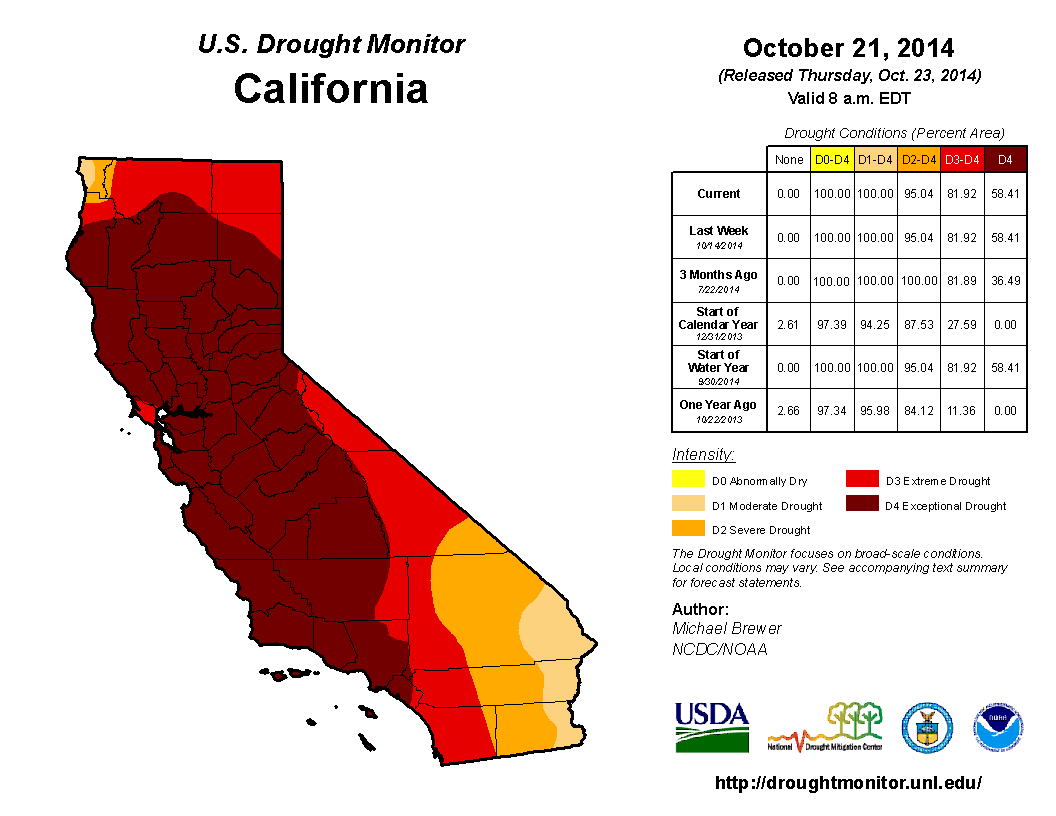
Drought in California in 2014

Meteorologist Jason Samenow estimated that during the peak of the movement's popularity in 2014, the equivalent of 5,000,000 US gallons (19,000,000 L; 4,200,000 imp gal) of water would have been used for the challenge. This calculation assumes that the average of one 4-US-gallon (15 L; 3.3 imp gal) bucket of water was used per video for the 1.2 million challenge videos which were posted during that time.

In January 2014, Governor Jerry Brown declared California to be in a drought state of emergency. This state of emergency was still in place as the Ice Bucket Challenge became most popular, and many local news stations in California took to criticizing the Challenge's unnecessary waste of water. Also at the time in China, various regions (including the important crop-producing Henan province) experienced months of extreme drought during the summer of 2014. On August 22, 2014, citizens of Henan stood together to protest the challenge, with signs that said "Henan, please say 'NO' to Ice Bucket Challenge."

To prevent wasting drinkable water, many performed the ALS Ice Bucket Challenge by using natural water sources. Carole King performed the challenge using creek water that was immediately returned to the creek, and the Killer Clown, a YouTube personality, performed the challenge using rainwater. In response to the criticisms in California, some Californians performed the challenge by using dirt instead of water.

Some ALS organizations, such as the ALS Therapy Development Institute, have published guidelines for the Ice Bucket Challenge to minimize water usage through alternatives, like "filling the bucket with socks".

== See also ==
- Book bucket challenge
- Mannequin Challenge
- Winter swimming
