= John B. Heywood (engineer) =

British mechanical engineer

John Benjamin Heywood is a British mechanical engineer known for his work on automotive engine research, for authoring a number of field-defining textbooks on the internal combustion engine, and as the director of the Sloan Automotive Lab at the Massachusetts Institute of Technology (MIT).

Heywood was elected a member of the National Academy of Engineering in 1998 for the prediction of emissions and efficiencies of spark-ignition engines and contributions to national policies on motor emissions.

== Early life and education ==
Heywood grew up in the United Kingdom in an academic family, the child of a mechanical engineer father, Harold Heywood, and a metallurgist mother, Frances Heywood. After graduating from Cambridge University with a BA, he moved to Cambridge, Massachusetts in 1960 to study at MIT for a master's degree in 1962, and completed a PhD in mechanical engineering in 1965.

== Career ==
Heywood's early work at MIT focused on chemical processes in car engines of molecules like oxides of nitrogen that lead to hydrocarbon emissions, at a time when it was unclear how and to what extent these contributed to atmospheric pollution. In 1972, he became director of the MIT Sloan Automotive Lab, where he worked with James C. Keck and James Fay on internal combustion engines, fuel, automotive pollutants, and policy around the future of transportation. He became a full professor at MIT in 1976. In 1988, he published a textbook, "Internal Combustion Engine Fundamentals", which served as a key text for mechanical engineering courses around the world and as an essential text for professional engineers in the field. The book sold over 130,000 copies, with a second edition published in 2018. In later stages of his career, Heywood worked on a number of forward-looking reports exploring the future of automotive transportation including "On the Road in 2020", published in 2000 and cited over 400 times, "On the Road To 2035" in 2008, and "On the Road Toward 2050" in 2015.

His comprehensive work across all parts of automotive engineering earned him the sobriquet "the Yoda of cars".

== Personal life ==
While at MIT around 1960, he met his wife Peggy who was studying history at Radcliffe College. The two temporarily moved back to England for John to work on plasma dynamics for the Central Electricity Generating Board, before returning to Cambridge in 1968.

John and Peggy had three sons; engineer Jamie, craftsman builder Stephen, and entrepreneur Benjamin. In 1999, Stephen was diagnosed with the terminal neurodegenerative disease amyotrophic lateral sclerosis (ALS) at the age of 29. Together the family, led by Jamie, founded the ALS Therapy Development Institute to try and find a cure for Stephen, documented in the documentary film, So Much So Fast, and the book His Brother's Keeper: A Story from the Edge of Medicine, written by Pulitzer Prize-winning author Jonathan Weiner. While Stephen died in 2006 from complications of ALS, Heywood continues to serve on the board of ALS TDI alongside his son, Jamie. Stephen's illness also inspired the online patient network PatientsLikeMe, founded by brothers Benjamin and Jamie with a college friend from MIT, Jeff Cole. In a review of His Brother's Keeper, the Los Angeles Times reviewer Mark Dowie wrote: "And what a family; tight-knit, loving, and defiantly loyal."

== Awards and distinctions ==
- ScD from the University of Cambridge
- Honorary doctor of technology, University of Gothenburg
- Honorary doctor of science, City University, London
- Sun Jae Professor of Mechanical Engineering
- Fellow of the Society of Automotive Engineers
- Fellow of the Institution of Mechanical Engineers
- Member of the National Academy of Engineering

== Bibliography ==
- Internal Combustion Engine Fundamentals (1988)
- The Two-Stroke Cycle Engine (1999)
- On the Road in 2020 (2000)
- On the Road to 2035 (2008)
- On the Road Toward 2050 (2015)
