= Bernd Scholz-Reiter =

German academic administrator (born 1957)

Bernd Scholz-Reiter (born 29 May 1957) is a German business engineer and academic administrator. He was the rector of the University of Bremen from 1 September 2012 until March 2022.

From 2007 until 2012 he was vice president of the Deutsche Forschungsgemeinschaft. He is a member of the Berlin-Brandenburgische Akademie der Wissenschaften.

== Trivia ==
Prof Scholz-Reiter took part in the Ice Bucket Challenge in 2014.
