= ICarbonX =

Chinese genomics company

iCarbonX
- Native name: iCarbonX(碳云智能）
- Company type: Private
- Industry: Health Care, Genomics
- Founded: October 2015
- Founder: Jun Wang
- Headquarters: Shenzhen, Guangdong Province, China
- Number of locations: 2
- Key people: Jun Wang
- Website: www.icarbonx.com

iCarbonX is a company founded by Chinese genomicist Jun Wang, former CEO of Beijing Genomic Institute (BGI), in 2015. iCarbonX combines genomics with other health factors such as metabolites, bacteria and lifestyle choices to create a digitalized form of life.

== History ==
iCarbonX was founded on October 27, 2015. On September 10, 2016, iCarbonX acquired Imagu Vision Technologies, an Israeli AI and image processing company, in order to establish an iCarbonX-Israel R&D center.

On January 5, 2017, iCarbonX announced its Digital Life Alliance with seven other companies including SomaLogic, HealthTell, PatientsLikeMe, AOBiome, GALT, Imagu and Robustnique.

iCarbonX has raised over $600 million in investment. Tencent Holdings Limited (owner of social-media app WeChat) and Zhongyuan Union Cell & Gene Engineering Corp. invested $200 million in iCarbonX, which made iCarbonX one of only three Chinese healthcare startups with a valuation of more than $1 billion (considered a Unicorn). The company has about 100 employees.

On January 5, 2017, iCarbonX released Meum, a digital health management platform. On the same day, iCarbonX announced a partnership with PatientsLikeMe, an online network for patients with chronic conditions. iCarbonX funded PatientsLikeMe with $100M with plans for the two companies to work together on genetic sequencing projects.

The company name, "iCarbonX," symbolizes the use of the internet and artificial intelligence to improve life, of which a central element is carbon. The "i" and "X" indicate the company's plans to combine the Internet and artificial intelligence to create something new.
