= Sean F. Scott =

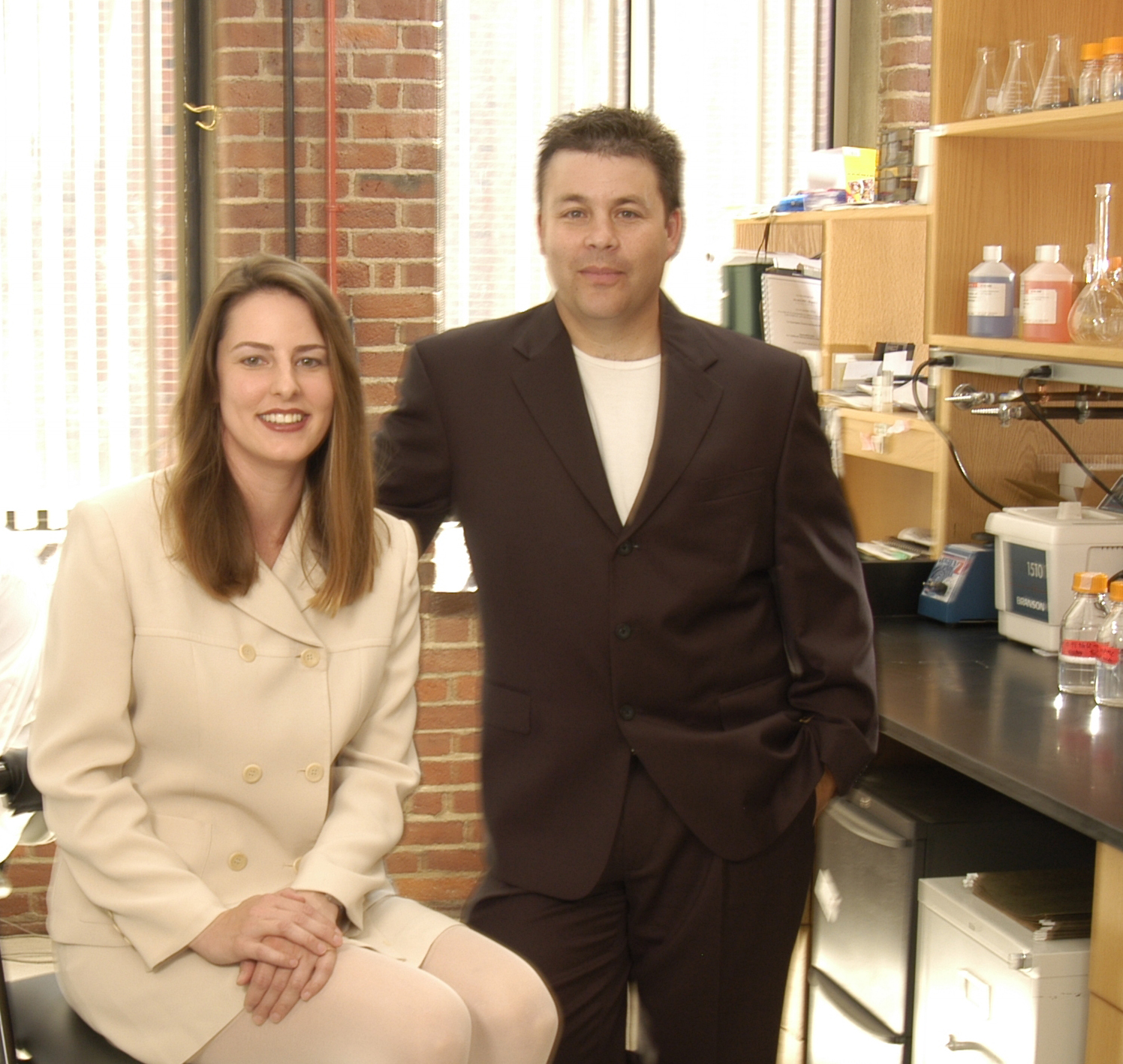
- Sean F. Scott and his wife, Nancy Kelly, at the ALS Therapy Development Institute in 2003.
- Born: Sean Forrester Scott; May 20, 1969
- Died: February 9, 2009 (aged 39); San Francisco, California
- Education: University of California, Berkeley
- Occupations: researcher, filmmaker, innovator, entrepreneur
- Known for: President of ALS TDI
- Spouse: Nancy Kelly
- Relatives: Edward W. Scott (uncle)

Sean Forrester Scott (May 20, 1969 – February 9, 2009) was a self-educated disease activist and researcher, filmmaker, innovator, entrepreneur and until the time of his death, the president of the ALS Therapy Development Institute, the world's largest amyotrophic lateral sclerosis research center. Scott himself was diagnosed with ALS in 2008 at the age of 38.

== Activism ==
Scott became active with ALS TDI when his mother, Vanna, was diagnosed with ALS in 2001. Four more of Vanna's seven siblings succumbed to the familial form of the disease by 2007, and eventually Sean Scott too died of complications from ALS in 2009.

In 2008, Scott was lead author of a landmark publication in the journal, Amyotrophic Lateral Sclerosis that described guidelines for experimental design of studies evaluating therapeutics in the mouse model. The work identified crucial errors present in many existing preclinical ALS studies. Scott's effort to establish standard model guidelines for preclinical development in ALS was featured in Nature in August 2008.

In 2006, Scott's effort to fund the ongoing research led him to Augie Nieto and Sharon Hesterlee. The ambitious $36 million partnership brokered between ALS TDI, Augie's Quest and the Muscular Dystrophy Association, a partnership that survived Scott, allowed for major expansion of the Institute's efforts to include the identification of genes that behave unusually in ALS and to determine how those differences affect the disease.

== Personal life ==
Scott was married in 2008 to longtime companion Nancy Kelly, who was also involved in ALS activism. Scott lived in San Francisco, California with his wife until his death, and is also survived by his father Richard Scott and uncle, Edward W. Scott.

Scott earned an undergraduate degree in rhetoric from the University of California, Berkeley.
