= Pat Quinn (ALS activist) =

ALS activist (1983–2020)

Patrick Quinn
- Born: February 10, 1983; Yonkers, New York
- Died: November 22, 2020 (aged 37); Yonkers, New York
- Cause of death: Amyotrophic lateral sclerosis
- Known for: ALS activism; Ice Bucket Challenge
- Spouse: Jennifer Flynn (divorced)

Patrick Quinn (February 10, 1983 – November 22, 2020) was an American amyotrophic lateral sclerosis (ALS) activist who helped generate awareness and raise more than US$220 million for medical research through the Ice Bucket Challenge, a viral social media campaign.

== Early life ==
Quinn was born on February 10, 1983, in Yonkers, New York, to Rosemary and Patrick Quinn Sr. He went to Iona College in New Rochelle, New York, where he was part of the rugby team. He was diagnosed with the amyotrophic lateral sclerosis disease (also known as motor neuron disease and in the U.S. as Lou Gehrig's disease) on March 8, 2013, a month after his 30th birthday.

== ALS advocacy ==
Along with fellow ALS activist and captain of the Boston College baseball team, Peter Frates, Quinn helped draw attention to ALS by co-creating the Ice Bucket Challenge, a video enabled fundraiser, that went viral and helped generate more than $220m for medical research for the disease. The challenge went viral in 2014, when celebrities and common people all across the world filmed short-form videos of themselves dumping buckets of ice water on their heads, committing to donations for ALS research, and asking others to do the same. The campaign had over 20 million videos being created and shared with celebrities including former President George W. Bush, Bill Gates, Justin Bieber, LeBron James, Leonardo DiCaprio, Lady Gaga, and Oprah Winfrey.

The campaign started in Florida with golfer Chris Kennedy, who took the challenge to cheer a family member with ALS; the news soon reached Quinn and Frates, who took up promoting the challenge on social media. Both Quinn and Frates undertook the challenge in support of the Cambridge, MA, based ALS Therapy Development Institute.

Writing in their book, Ice Bucket Challenge: Pete Frates and the Fight Against ALS, authors Casey Sherman and Dave Wedge note that Frates went on to become Quinn's mentor, drawn by his "determination, grit, drive, and passion" and also the kinship from the fact that both were much younger than the average ALS patient.

Quinn continued his advocacy after the challenge through his foundation "Quinn for the Win," to generate awareness of the disease and raise funds for research. He continued to speak in forums raising awareness and conducted the challenge annually every August, in Yonkers, NY, called "Every August Until the Cure". He was honored by the ALS Association with the "ALS Heroes" award in 2015, for his "significant positive impact" on the fight against ALS. He was also nominated along with Frates for TIME Magazine's Person of the Year for his role in raising awareness for the disease and promoting research.

In a statement, the ALS Association, acknowledging Quinn's efforts, went on to say, "The Ice Bucket challenge dramatically accelerated the fight against ALS, leading to new research discoveries, expansion of care for people with ALS, and greater investment by the government in ALS research.” Speaking of his specific role, the ALS Association said, "Pat changed the trajectory of the fight against ALS forever. He inspired millions to get involved and care about people who are living with ALS." Frates had died of the disease a year earlier at the age of 34.

== Personal life ==
Quinn married Jennifer Flynn, his girlfriend at the time of his diagnosis with ALS, in 2014. The union later ended in a divorce.

Quinn died on November 22, 2020, at the St. John's Riverside Hospital in Yonkers, New York, after suffering from ALS for seven years. He was 37 years old.
