= Benjamin Heywood (entrepreneur) =

American Entrepreneur and investor (born 1971)

- Born: November 7, 1971 (age 54); Boston, United States
- Education: Massachusetts Institute of Technology, Anderson School at UCLA
- Occupations: Entrepreneur, Venture capitalist
- Known for: Co-founded SkyRiver Ventures and PatientsLikeMe

Benjamin Heywood (born November 7, 1971 in Boston) is an American entrepreneur, patient advocate, and technology venture capitalist. He is best known as a co‑founder of PatientsLikeMe, an online health community platform that enables patients to share their health data to improve medical outcomes and support research.

As of 2025, he is a General Partner at the venture‑capital firm SkyRiver Ventures, investing in early‑stage deep tech and digital health.

== Early life and education ==
Heywood grew up in Newton, Massachusetts, United States. He earned a BS in Mechanical Engineering from Massachusetts Institute of Technology and later received an MBA from the Anderson School at UCLA and attended the Producers Program and UCLA School of Theater, Film and Television. After college he worked in film production including as a production assistant on The Guru.

== Career ==
=== PatientsLikeMe ===
In 2004, Heywood co‑founded PatientsLikeMe with his brother Jamie Heywood and friend Jeff Cole following their brother Stephen Heywood's diagnosis with amyotrophic lateral sclerosis (ALS). The platform was developed to democratize access to health data by enabling patients to track and share symptoms, treatments, and outcomes.

PatientsLikeMe is a privately funded company that aggregates its users health information and works with the pharmaceutical and medical device industry to understand real-world experiences of patients. PatientsLikeMe was named one of "15 companies that will change the world" by CNN Money. In 2019, the company was acquired by UnitedHealth Group.

Heywood served as president of PatientsLikeMe and led its growth into a leading digital‑health community platform, attracting investment from Invus Capital, CommerceNet, Omidyar Network, and prominent angel investors. Under his leadership, the company raised over $100M in capital and contributed to numerous peer‑reviewed research publications in collaboration with academic and industry partners.

=== SkyRiver Ventures ===
After his tenure at PatientsLikeMe, Heywood transitioned into investing and advising roles. He co‑founded SkyRiver Ventures in 2021 and has backed ventures across robotics, advanced materials, AI, mining, biotech, and electrification.

He continues to foster the entrepreneurial technology ecosystem through mentoring at the Creative Destruction Lab, and MIT's Venture Mentoring Service and Sandbox program.

== Public speaking and advocacy ==
Heywood has been a speaker at conferences such as TEDx, Health 2.0, GET (Genomes / Envionments / Traits) and BIO-IT World where he promotes patient‑centered data sharing and transparency in medical research.

In 2016 he and his brother were jointly awarded the International Alliance of ALS/MND Organizations' "Humanitarian Award" for their long-standing commitment to the fight against ALS/MND. He has also contributed to peer-reviewed research focussing on understanding trust of genetic information.

== Personal life ==
Ben featured in the 2004 biography "His Brother's Keeper: A Story from the Edge of Medicine". Benjamin and Jamie were also profiled in "So Much So Fast", a 2006 award-winning documentary chronicling the brothers' fight to treat their brother Stephen Heywood and detailing the founding of the ALS Therapy Development Institute. The film premiered at the Sundance Film Festival.

Their brother Stephen Heywood—whose ALS diagnosis inspired PatientsLikeMe—died in 2006.

His father, Prof. John B. Heywood is a British mechanical engineer known for his work on automotive engine research, for authoring a number of field-defining textbooks on the internal combustion engine, and as the director of the Sloan Automotive Lab at the Massachusetts Institute of Technology (MIT).

His mother was raised on a family dairy farm in Brooking, South Dakota, and was a social worker for the state of Massachusetts.
