= So Much So Fast =

- Promotional film poster
- Directed by: Steven Ascher; Jeanne Jordan
- Written by: Steven Ascher; Jeanne Jordan
- Starring: Jamie Heywood, Stephen Heywood, Benjamin Heywood (entrepreneur)
- Release date: 2006
- Running time: 87 minutes
- Country: United States
- Language: English

So Much So Fast is a documentary film written and directed by Academy Award nominees Steven Ascher and Jeanne Jordan. It premiered in competition at the 2006 Sundance Film Festival, and won the Audience Award at the Boston Independent Film Festival.

== Synopsis ==
So Much So Fast documents 5 years in the life of Stephen Heywood who, at 29, discovers he had the paralyzing neurodegenerative disease Amyotrophic lateral sclerosis (Lou Gehrig's disease).

Determined to live as well as possible, Stephen gets married, has a son and rebuilds two houses. His and his wife Wendy's observations of the world and his disease explore the fragility of life.

The film also tracks his family's response to the drug companies that ignore his disease because there is not enough profit in curing it, and his brother, Jamie Heywood's, creation of the ALS Therapy Development Foundation research facility to find a cure for Stephen's disease in time.

== Reception ==
On review aggregator website Rotten Tomatoes, the film holds an approval rating of 96% based on 23 reviews, with an average rating of 8.1/10.
