= NIMA-related kinase 1 =

Protein-coding gene in the species Homo sapiens

NEK1

Identifiers
- Aliases: NEK1, NY-REN-55, SRPS2, SRPS2A, SRTD6, NIMA related kinase 1, ALS24
- External IDs: OMIM: 604588; MGI: 97303; GeneCards: NEK1
Available structures
PDB	Ortholog search: PDBe RCSB
PDB	List of PDB id codes 4APC, 4B9D
Enzyme activity
EC #	BRENDA	ExPASy	KEGG	MetaCyc
2.7.11.1	↗	↗	↗	↗

Gene location (Human)
Chr.	Chromosome 4 (human)
Band	4q33	Start	169,369,704 bp
Band	4q33	End	169,612,632 bp

Gene location (Mouse)
Chr.	Chromosome 8 (mouse)
Band	8 B3.1|8 30.91 cM	Start	61,446,229 bp
Band	8 B3.1|8 30.91 cM	End	61,584,380 bp
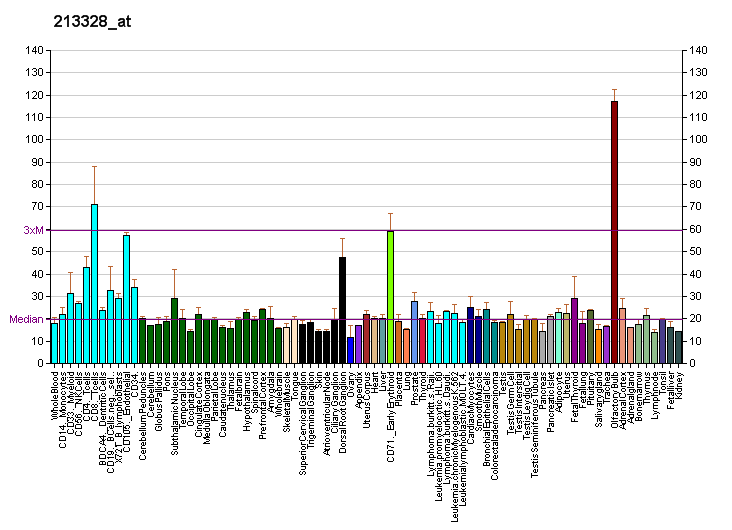

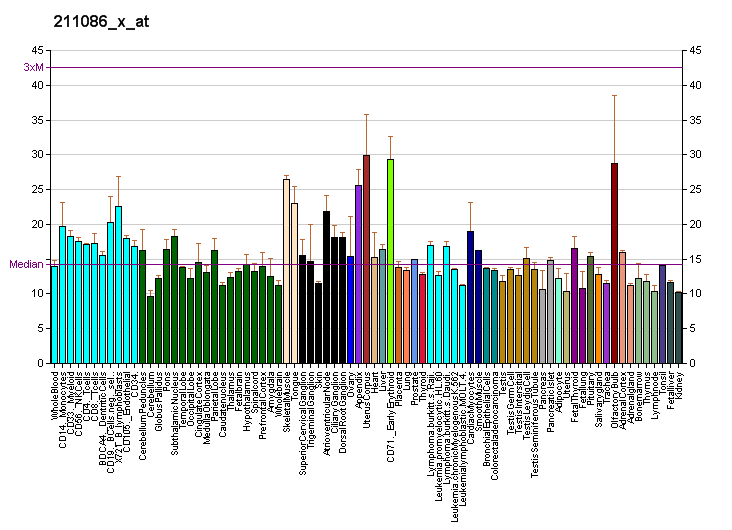

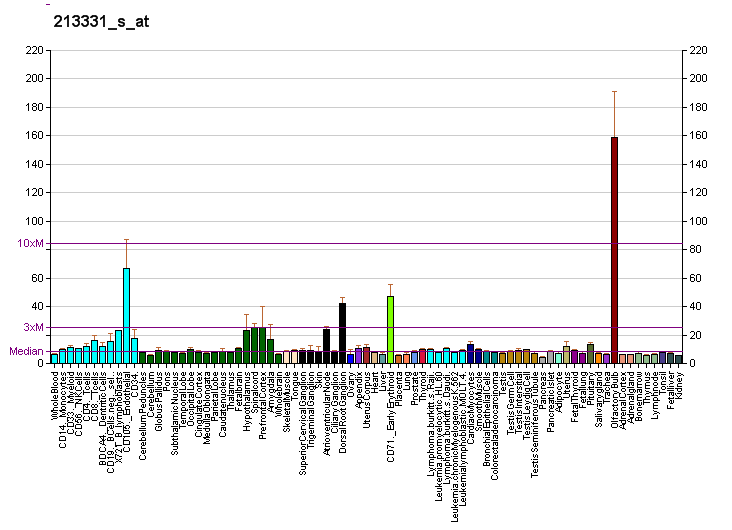
RNA expression pattern
Bgee	Human / Mouse (ortholog); Top expressed in: secondary oocyte; trigeminal ganglion; spinal ganglia; optic nerve; sural nerve; internal globus pallidus; sperm; pars reticulata; pars compacta; lactiferous duct / Top expressed in: sciatic nerve; zygote; secondary oocyte; vestibular sensory epithelium; trigeminal ganglion; facial motor nucleus; cumulus cell; lumbar spinal ganglion; iris; ciliary body; More reference expression data
BioGPS	More reference expression data
Gene ontology
Molecular function	transferase activity; protein kinase activity; nucleotide binding; metal ion binding; kinase activity; protein binding; protein tyrosine kinase activity; ATP binding; protein serine/threonine kinase activity; 14-3-3 protein binding
Cellular component	cytoplasm; centrosome; pericentriolar material; microtubule organizing center; cytoskeleton; nucleus
Biological process	phosphorylation; cell division; protein phosphorylation; cell projection organization; cell cycle; peptidyl-tyrosine phosphorylation; cilium assembly; regulation of mitotic cell cycle; signal transduction; stress-activated protein kinase signaling cascade; activation of protein kinase activity; regulation of apoptotic process; cellular response to DNA damage stimulus
Sources:Amigo / QuickGO
Orthologs
Databases	NCBI: entry; OMA: entry
Species	Human	Mouse
Entrez	4750	18004
Ensembl	ENSG00000137601	ENSMUSG00000031644
UniProt	Q96PY6	P51954
RefSeq (mRNA)	NM_001199397; NM_001199398; NM_001199399; NM_001199400; NM_012224 NM_001374418; NM_001374419; NM_001374420; NM_001374421; NM_001374422; NM_001374423	NM_001293637; NM_001293638; NM_001293639; NM_175089
RefSeq (protein)	NP_001186326; NP_001186327; NP_001186328; NP_001186329; NP_036356 NP_001361347; NP_001361348; NP_001361349; NP_001361350; NP_001361351; NP_001361352	NP_001280566; NP_001280567; NP_001280568; NP_780298
Location (UCSC)	Chr 4: 169.37 – 169.61 Mb	Chr 8: 61.45 – 61.58 Mb
PubMed search
- Wikidata
View/Edit Human	View/Edit Mouse

NIMA (never in mitosis gene a)-related kinase 1, also known as NEK1, is a human gene highly expressed in germ cells and thought to be involved in meiosis. It is also involved in the response to DNA damage from radiation; defects in this gene can be a cause of polycystic kidney disease. NEK1 is thought to be involved in amytrophic lateral sclerosis.

The gene was discovered by researchers with Project MinE, with the ALS Association providing funding raised through the Ice Bucket Challenge.

== See also ==
- NEK2
- NEK3
- NEK4
