= AOBiome =

U.S. biotech company

- Company type: Private
- Founded: 2013
- Headquarters: Cambridge, Massachusetts, {{{location_country}}}
- Key people: Lenny Barshack; James Heywood; Hilly Thompson; David Whitlock
- Website: www.aobiome.com
- Current status: Active

AOBiome is a Boston-based biotech company focused on transforming human health through products that restore ammonia-oxidizing bacteria (AOB). The company is developing a novel class of therapeutics to improve skin health, hypertension, and other systemic conditions.

== Company ==
The company was founded in 2013 by MIT chemical engineer David Whitlock and PatientsLikeMe founder Jamie Heywood, along with co-founders Hilly Thompson and Lenny Barshack.

== History ==
In 2001 while on a date near some horse stables, engineer David Whitlock was asked why horses roll in the dirt. Not knowing the answer, he studied soil samples and hypothesized that the Nitrosomonas eutropha that he found present was a key species as these bacteria feed on ammonia and thus could provide a symbiotic ammonia processing function for horses and other vertebrates. To test this theory he suspended the bacteria in water and coated himself with them and then stopped bathing in order to give the AOB a chance to colonize his body. Whitlock has reported in national media that he has not had a shower in over 10 years, but washes his hands before eating, with a number of journalists confirming that he does not smell bad as a result. Whitlock has speculated, along the lines of the "hygiene hypothesis", that modern lifestyle changes such as the adoption of frequent bathing and synthetic cosmetics have led to the death of so-called "old friend" bacteria which previously performed important functions in the body.

AOBiome was founded in 2013 with a mission to study the effects of AOB on the skin microbiome and overall skin health. They have since performed in-vitro studies, in-vivo studies, and two human studies in acne vulgaris, the results of which have led the company to now additionally explore systemic therapies for conditions such as hypertension. The company has a patent covering the topical use of AOB.

== Ammonia-oxidizing bacteria ==
Ammonia-oxidizing bacteria (AOB) are a naturally occurring type of nitrifying bacteria that metabolize the ammonia found in sweat, creating nitrite and nitric oxide. AOBiome is testing the hypothesis that by increasing local and systemic nitric oxide levels, this bacteria has both anti-inflammatory and anti-infective properties. While the therapeutic potential of nitrite and nitric oxide is widely recognized, the bacteria are sensitive to the ingredients in most modern soaps and beauty products. AOBiome Cosmetics also sells a topical mist direct to consumers on their website.

== Clinical trials ==
AOBiome is developing topical biologics for the treatment of inflammatory conditions, specifically looking at the therapeutic properties of ammonia-oxidizing bacteria. AOBiome started its Phase 2 clinical trial for adult acne in 2015. AOBiome has received attention for its prospective interventional study on the link between a bacteria-infused topical spray and hypertension. The Wall Street Journal describes that "Although the company knew when it began work on treating acne that nitric oxide has a beneficial effect on hypertension, it didn't expect to see such a strong reduction of blood pressure in the [acne] study."

They are also looking into related therapies for allergic rhinitis and eczema (Phase I trials) as well as wound healing, migraines, and thermoregulation (preclinical trials).

A peer reviewed study of AOBs for the treatment of adults with mild-moderate atopic dermatitis and moderate-to-severe itch describes a phase 2b randomised controlled trial which found a 34% reduction in perceived itch relative to placebo.
