= SomaLogic =

American clinical diagnostics company

SomaLogic, Inc.
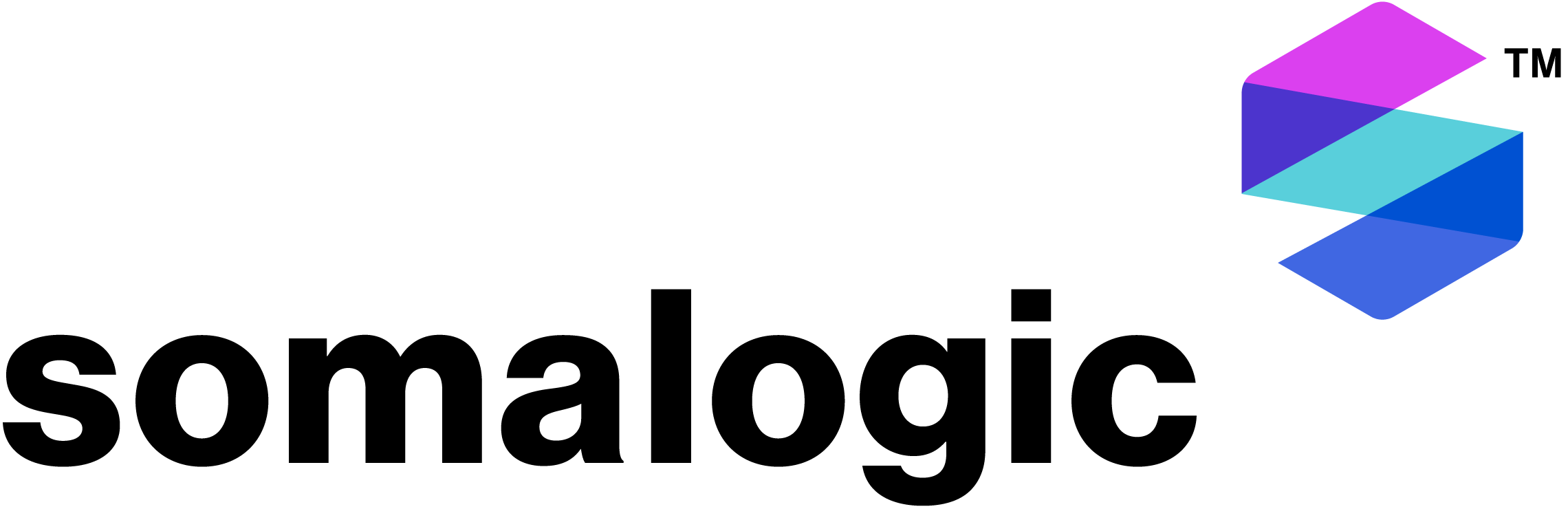
- Traded as: Nasdaq: SLGC
- Industry: Health information
- Founded: 2000; 26 years ago
- Founder: Larry Gold
- Fate: Merged with Standard BioTools
- Headquarters: Boulder, Colorado, United States
- Website: somalogic.com

SomaLogic, Inc. is a protein biomarker discovery and clinical diagnostics company located in Boulder, Colorado. It became listed on Nasdaq in September 2021 with a merger with the special-purpose acquisition company CM Life Sciences II, Inc. The company merged with Standard BioTools in January 2024 and was later acquired by Illumina on January 30, 2026.

== History ==
SomaLogic was founded in 2000 by Larry Gold, who served as both Chairman of the Board of Directors and as the company’s first CEO. In 2013, Byron Hewett was appointed as CEO, with Gold continuing to serve as Chairman. Gold previously founded the pharmaceutical company NeXstar Pharmaceuticals, which merged with Gilead in 1999. Hewett stepped down in 2017 and board member Alister Reynolds was appointed the new CEO. A year later, Reynolds was replaced by Roy Smythe.

In July 2022, SomaLogic agreed to acquire Palamedrix Inc, DNA nanotechnology company.

== Systems ==
SomaLogic monitors health and disease through the analysis of protein concentration changes in biological samples. They developed the SomaScan platform, which allows scientists and researchers to identify protein biomarkers for diseases and conditions, and apply them to drug and diagnostic research and development. The hypothesis behind the analysis is that different diseases and conditions each have novel protein profiles, including in early stages of onset. As of 2013, the commercial version of the SomaScan platform could identify and quantify 1,129 protein analytes simultaneously. As of 2017, the number had increased to about 4,200. The platform is based on modified-aptamer binding technology (“SOMAmers”) that bind to their respective target proteins in order to determine their presence and quantity in a sample.

== Partnerships ==
In 2013, SomaLogic partnered with Agilent Technologies to distribute SomaScan systems to American research and educational institutions. It also signed a development deal with Quest Diagnostics to create a blood test for early-stage, non-small-cell lung cancer. It also has partnerships with Otsuka and New England Biolabs. In 2016, a study was published that used the SomaLogic system to identify nine biomarker proteins that could predict the risk of a second heart attack in those who have suffered a previous cardiovascular event. A study in Circulation also used the 9-protein cardiovascular risk score for early detection of the harmful effects of Torcetrapib. In 2016 they also developed a test to diagnose latent tuberculosis, and to predict the progression of the disease after onset. In 2019, a study was published that used the SomaScan platform to build protein-based models for 11 different health indications: liver fat, kidney filtration, percentage body fat, visceral fat mass, lean body mass, cardiopulmonary fitness, physical activity, alcohol consumption, cigarette smoking, diabetes risk, and primary cardiovascular event risk.

SomaLogic has a long-term partnership with the Novartis Institutes for BioMedical Research, with Novartis taking an ownership stake in SomaLogic in 2014 as a part of the extension of their initial agreement. In 2016, SomaLogic formed a collaborative partnership with Oxford University, and in 2017, it joined the iCarbonX Digital Life Alliance (including an investment by iCarbonX in SomaLogic).

In 2018, SomaLogic teamed up with the Leeds Centre for Personalised Health and Medicine to test the SomaScan platform in clinical studies in the UK. That same year, SomaLogic also began to package its insights as diagnostic information for sale to other companies, focusing on proteomic data. In 2019, SomaLogic entered into a new 10-year agreement with Novartis to use the SomaScan proteomics technology in drug discovery and development efforts. Also that year, SomaLogic began commercially offering health information tests on the SomaScan Platform to prescribing physicians in Colorado. In 2020, NEC Solution Innovators, Ltd. of Japan, a subsidiary of NEC Corporation, launched a new company, FonesLife Corporation, that will collaborate with SomaLogic to bring proteomic-based health monitoring tests to people in Japan.
