= Cybex International =

American fitness equipment manufacturer

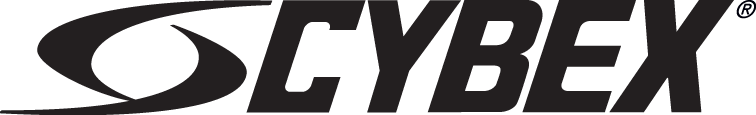
- Type: Brand
- Traded as: Nasdaq: CYBI
- Industry: Fitness
- Founded: Late 1960s (The Cybex Ergometer Company)
- Founder: The Cybex Ergometer Company
- Headquarters: Rosemont, Illinois: Manufacturing: Owatonna, Minnesota (US); Franklin Park, Illinois (US); Leicestershire (UK)
- Products: Exercise equipment
- Number of employees: 600+
- Parent: KPS Capital Partners, LP
- Website: www.cybexintl.com

Cybex International was an American fitness equipment manufacturer for commercial and consumer use. It produced mainly cardiovascular and strength equipment such as Arc Trainers, treadmills, stationary bicycles and steppers. Cybex marketed its products through distributors in over 87 countries. The company had over 600 employees and its products were manufactured in its two manufacturing facilities located in Medway, Massachusetts and Owatonna, Minnesota.

== History ==
Cybex International was founded in the late 1960s as "The Cybex Ergometer Company" in Ronkonkoma, New York. It was acquired by Lumex, which was traded publicly on the American Stock Exchange. At that time, it manufactured isokinetic rehabilitation equipment. In 1995, Lumex sold its medical supply business and changed its name to Cybex (AMEX: CYB). In May 1997, Cybex merged with Trotter, Inc., primarily a manufacturer of treadmills, whose manufacturing facility was located in Medway, MA. In this merger, UM Holdings, the owner of Trotter, Inc., gained 51% of Cybex's interests and publicly traded the company. In 1998, Cybex acquired Tectrix, a California-based manufacturer of primarily bikes and steppers; the production of which was moved to Cybex's manufacturing facility in Medway. Cybex acquired direct sales and distribution in the United Kingdom by its 2001 acquisition of Forza. Arc Trainer is its most recent product.

In 2010, a New York jury awarded a plaintiff $66.5 million (later reduced to $44.5 million) for personal injuries suffered after a piece of Cybex strength equipment fell on her. In 2012, the plaintiff settled the claim for $19.5 million as Cybex would likely have been forced into bankruptcy without the settlement. In February 2013, UM Holdings purchased the outstanding publicly traded stock of CYBI, taking the company private.

=== Acquisition by Life Fitness ===
On January 20, 2016, Cybex International, Inc. was purchased by Brunswick Corporation for $195 million. As part of this purchase, Cybex joined the Life Fitness portfolio of fitness brands, along with Life Fitness, Hammer Strength, InMovement, SciFIT, and Indoor Cycling Group (ICG).

==== Closure of Medway, MA manufacturing facility ====
As part of the integration process for Cybex International, Inc. and Brunswick Corporation/Life Fitness, the Medway, MA manufacturing facility, which employed approximately 150 people, was shut down effective September 30, 2017. Component fabrication and engineering was moved to other Life Fitness facilities, including the Cybex location in Owatonna, MN, Franklin Park, IL, and Rosemont, IL.

=== Acquisition by KPS Capital Partners ===
In 2018, the Brunswick Corporation announced it would be spinning-off its fitness equipment business, including its Brunswick Billiards division, as Life Fitness Holdings in 2019. In May 2019, Brunswick announced its intention to sell Life Fitness Holdings to KPS Capital Partners. —including the iconic Life Fitness, Hammer Strength, Cybex International, Indoor Cycling Group, SCIFIT, and Brunswick Billiards brands—for approximately $490 million. The sale was completed in June 2019.
