= Arc Trainer =

Stationary exercise machine

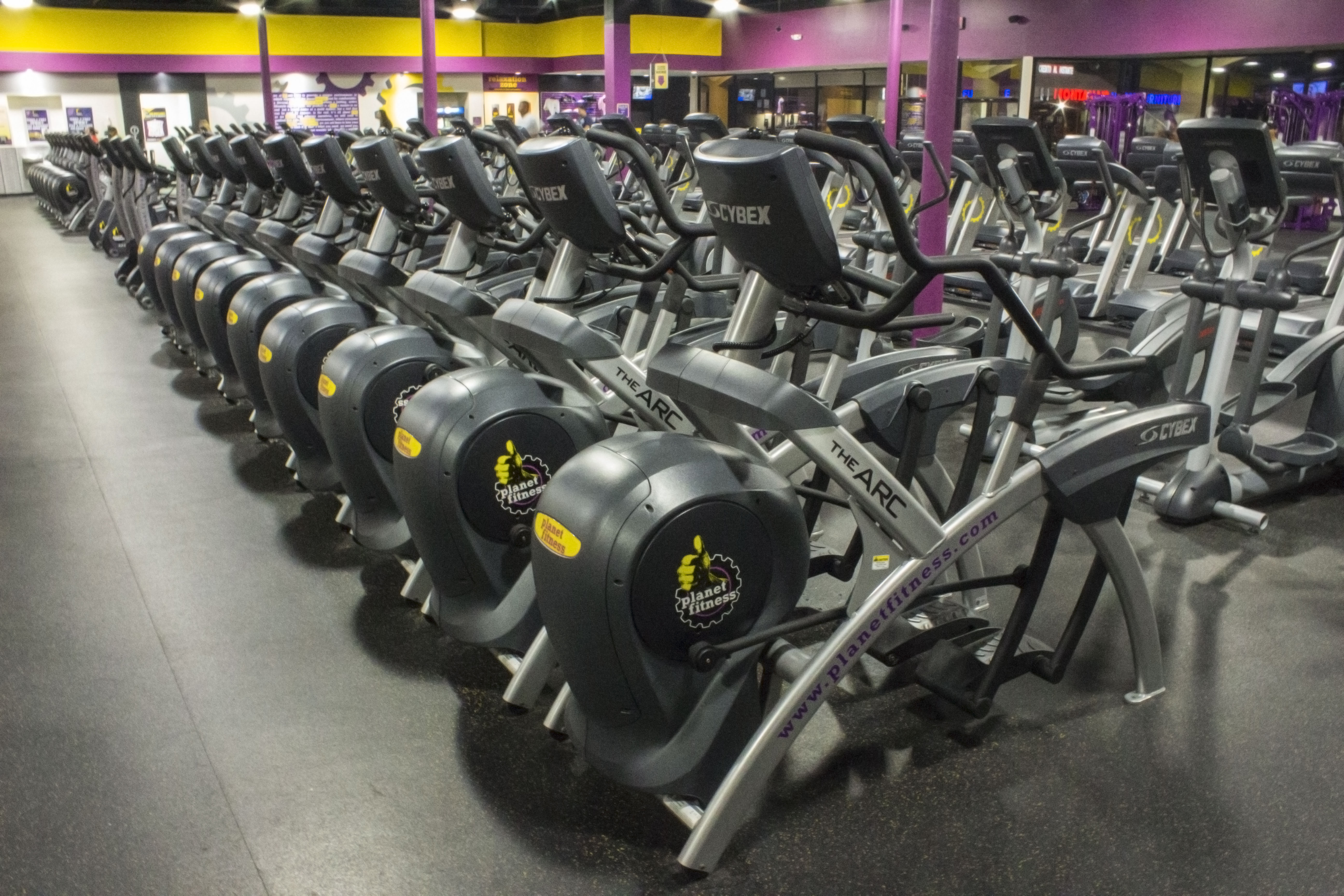
A row of Arc Trainers

The Arc Trainer is a stationary, non-impact exercise machine, and is a registered trademark of Cybex International, Inc. The Arc Trainer is manufactured in Owatonna, MN.

First introduced in 2003, the Arc Trainer’s footplates move in an arcuate path of motion, as opposed to the elliptical pattern seen in elliptical trainers. The arc pattern of motion is a patented technology, designed to generate force only when the user is in the load-bearing phase of the gait cycle. This generates forces in the legs which balance the loading between the hip and knee joints. The result of this balanced loading design creates less stress on the knee joint and allows higher muscle training effect with lower perceived exertion.

It is comparable to a treadmill in its ability to induce heart muscle activity, but reduces the impact shock typically associated with treadmill running.

The Arc Trainer is adjustable for incline and resistance and has a variable stride rate. Resistance settings are proportional to body-weight, such that the same amount of relative work is performed by a 110 lb female and a 250 lb male when the same resistance level is selected. Researchers found that healthy men burn about 10.8 calories per minute while working on the Arc Trainer, compared to about 9.3 calories per minute while on an elliptical. There are two versions of the Arc Trainer, a lower body version and a total body version. The Total Body Arc Trainer uses a same side forward pattern of motion where the arm and leg on the same side move together. This movement pattern allows the user to transfer work to their upper body without simultaneously increasing the work rate of the legs.

== See also ==
- Cross-training
- Weight training
