= Life Fitness =

American fitness equipment manufacturer

Life Fitness / Hammer Strength
- Type: Portfolio company
- Founded: 1977; 49 years ago
- Founder: Augie Nieto and Ray Wilson
- Headquarters: Rosemont, Illinois
- Key people: Jim Pisani (CEO)
- Brands: Life Fitness; Hammer Strength; Cybex; Indoor Cycling Group; SCIFIT; InMovement
- Owner: KPS Capital Partners
- Number of employees: 2,460 (2019)
- Website: lifefitness.com

Life Fitness / Hammer Strength is an American fitness company specializing in the production and distribution of cardiovascular and strength training equipment under two brands: Life Fitness and Hammer Strength. It is headquartered in Rosemont, Illinois and is a portfolio company of KPS Capital Partners.

== History ==
Keene P. Dimick created an exercise bike in 1968. In 1977, Augie Nieto incorporated the company in as Lifecycle, Inc. to sell exercise bikes that were based on Dimick's design. Nieto sold the company to Bally Total Fitness in 1984, who subsequently renamed the company Life Fitness, Inc.

Life Fitness created the first computerized strength training program in 1988.

In 1991, Bally Total Fitness sold the company to Mancuso & Company, a private equity firm, for $62.5 million. The same year, Life Fitness expanded into treadmills.

Life Fitness was acquired by Brunswick Corporation in June 1997 for $310 million. The sale was completed on July 11, 1997. Later in 1997, Life Fitness bought Hammer Strength, a manufacturer of weight machines. ParaBody, Inc. was bought by Life Fitness in 1998.

In 2015, Brunswick Billiards was placed under Life Fitness by its parent company. In addition, Life Fitness created InMovement, a product line for workplaces, and acquired SCIFIT.

In January 2016, Cybex International became part of Life Fitness following its $195 million acquisition by Brunswick Corporation. Indoor Cycling Group was also acquired the same year.

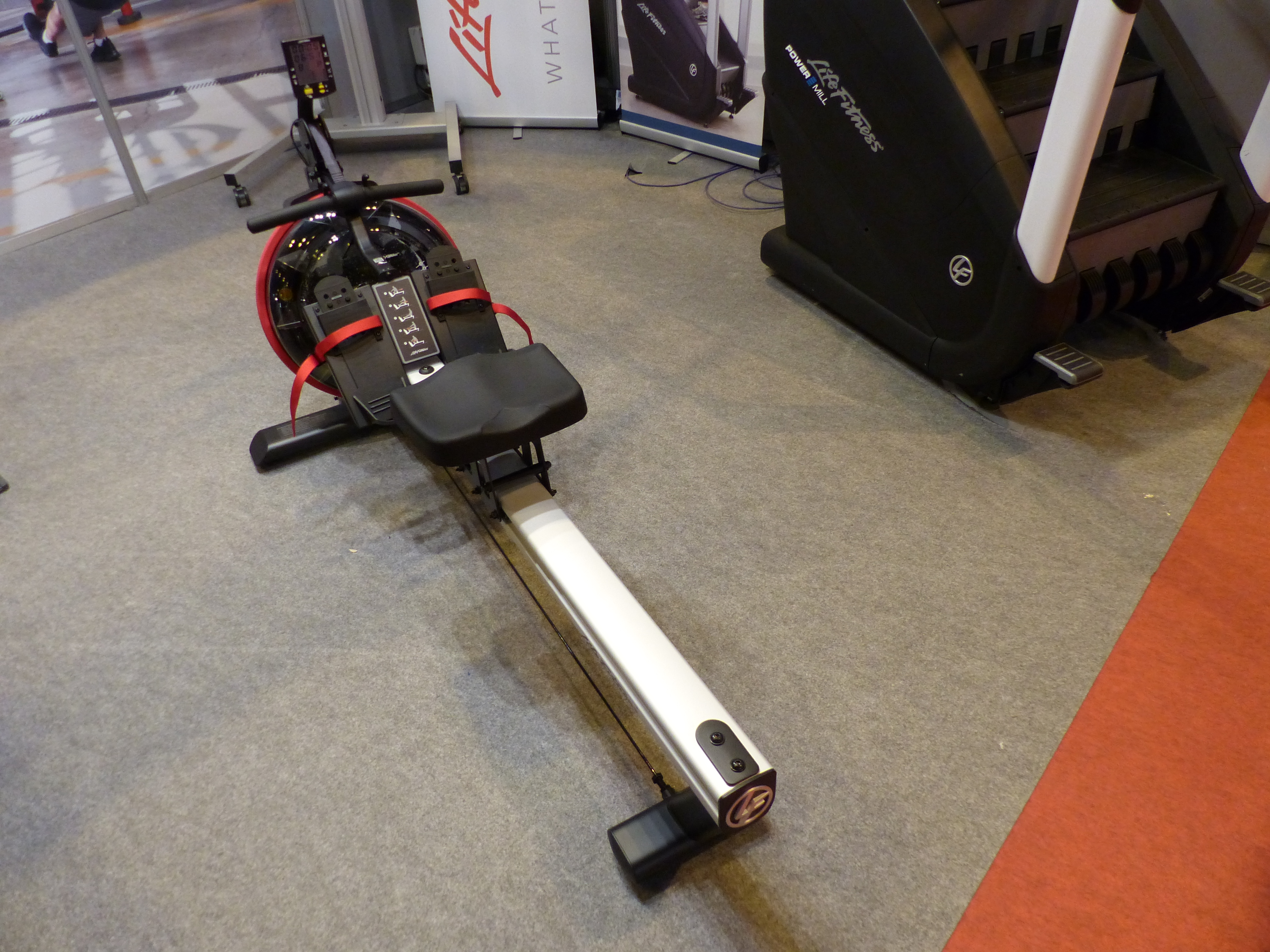
Row GX Trainer

In 2019, Brunswick Corporation agreed to sell Life Fitness to New York private equity firm KPS Capital Partners for $490 million. The deal moved Brunswick Corporation's entire fitness and recreation division—including Brunswick Billiards, the company's original business—into private hands, as Brunswick Corporation focused on its remaining portfolio of marine engines and boats. The sale was completed on June 27, 2019.

In 2022, Life Fitness agreed to sell its Brunswick Billiards business unit to Escalade Sports for $32 million.
