= PatientsLikeMe =

Health management social networking website

- Company type: Private
- Website type: Social networking service
- Founded: 2004
- Headquarters: Cambridge, Massachusetts, {{{location_country}}}
- Key people: Atul Dhir (CEO)
- Website: patientslikeme.com
- Launched: October 10, 2005
- Current status: Active

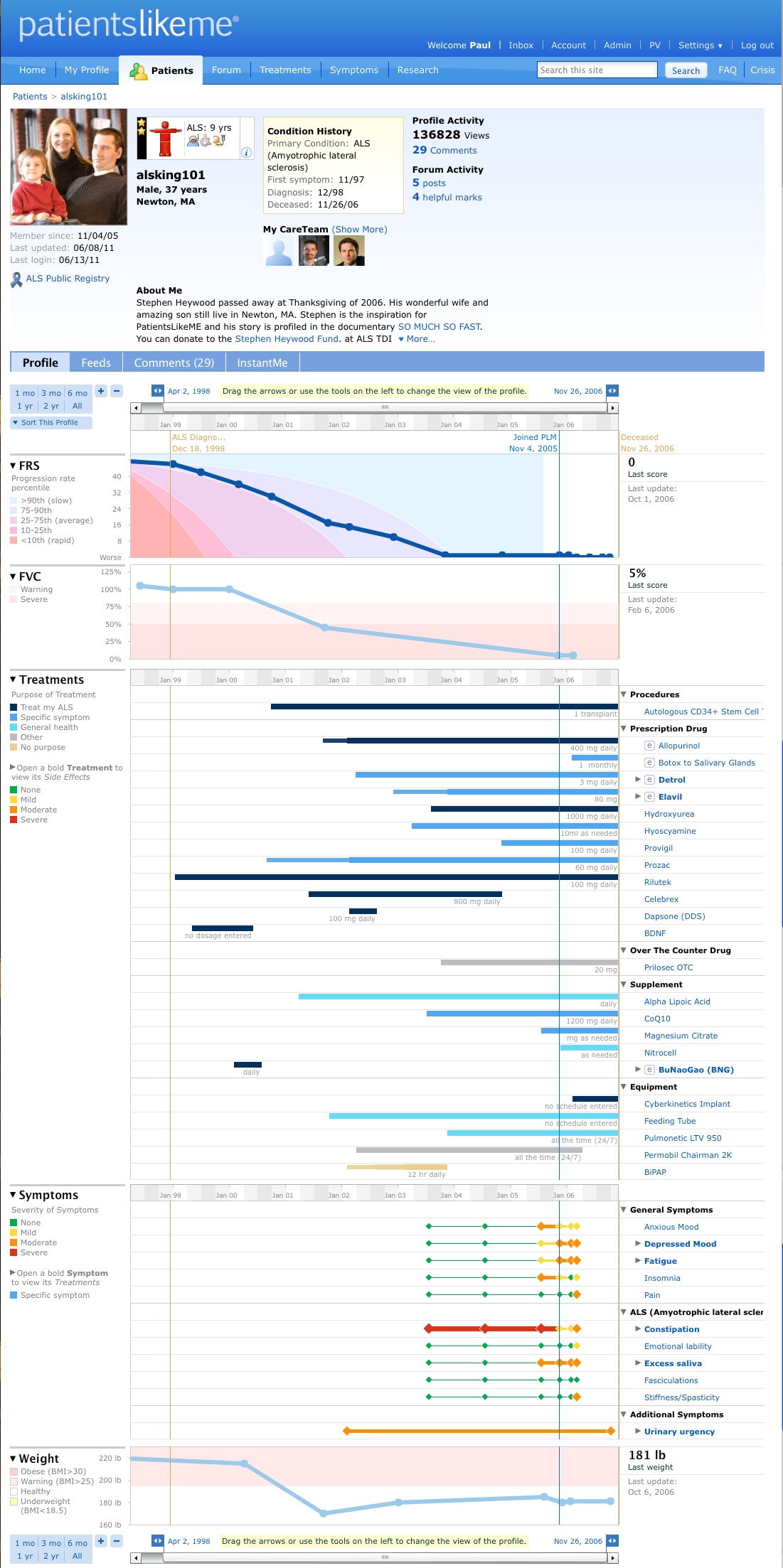
Stephen Heywood's profile on PatientsLikeMe

PatientsLikeMe (PLM) is a health management and social networking website. The platform currently has over 830,000 members who are dealing with more than 2,900 conditions, such as ALS, MS, and epilepsy. Data generated by patients themselves are collected and quantified with the goal of providing an environment for peer support and learning. These data capture the influences of different lifestyle choices, socio-demographics, conditions and treatments on a person's health.

== History ==
PatientsLikeMe was inspired by the life experiences of Stephen Heywood, diagnosed in 1998 at the age of 29 with amyotrophic lateral sclerosis (ALS), or Lou Gehrig's disease. The company was founded in 2004 by his brothers Jamie and Ben Heywood and long-time family friend Jeff Cole.

After being diagnosed with ALS, Stephen's family founded a non-profit, ALS Therapy Development Institute, in an attempt to slow his disease and treat his symptoms. However, the slow pace of research and the trial-and-error approach was time-consuming and repetitive. They realized that Stephen's experience was like that of other patients around the world who often have specific questions about their treatment options, and what to expect.

PatientsLikeMe was created to help patients connect with others who know firsthand what they are going through to share advice and resources. The platform provides health profiles with clinical reporting tools where members can document symptoms, track treatments, and monitor side effects. Users can view aggregated health data from other members with the same condition. Members use forums, private messages, and profile comments to communicate with other users.

In 2017, PatientsLikeMe entered into a partnership with iCarbonX to apply next-generation biological measures and machine learning to understand more about the basis of human health and disease. iCarbonX, founded in 2015 by genomicist Jun Wang, took an equity position in PatientsLikeMe and provided multi-omics characterization services to the company.

In 2019, PatientsLikeMe was acquired by UnitedHealth Group after being forced by the United States government to divest their investment by iCarbonX. Unitedhealth Group and PatientsLikeMe made plans to help patients with similar health concerns connect to share experiences. In 2020, PatientsLikeMe began to operate as an independent company backed by Optum Ventures, a UnitedHealth Group affiliate.

== Expansion beyond ALS ==
PatientsLikeMe launched its first online community for ALS patients in 2006. From there, the company began adding other communities for other life-changing conditions, including multiple sclerosis (MS), Parkinson's disease, fibromyalgia, HIV, chronic fatigue syndrome, mood disorders, epilepsy, organ transplantation, progressive supranuclear palsy, multiple system atrophy, and Devic's disease (neuromyelitis optica). The company's approach was to read the scientific literature and listen to patients to identify outcome measures, symptoms, and treatments that were important to patients and could be accurately reported. For example, the development of the MS community involved the development of a new patient reported outcome measure, the MS Rating Scale (MSRS), to ensure patients could accurately determine how their condition was progressing over time. However, building one community at a time was a slow process and the company risked being overly narrow in focus while excluding more than 5,000 patients who had requested new communities as of December 2010.

In April 2011, the company expanded its scope and opened its doors to any patient with any condition. Today the website covers more than 2,900 health conditions, with new members joining daily from the US and other countries around the world. Of note are the nearly 14,000 ALS members, who have helped make PatientsLikeMe's flagship community the largest online population of ALS patients in the world. In the United States, approximately 10 percent of newly diagnosed ALS patients register on the site each month, and 2 percent of all multiple sclerosis patients in the US participate in the community.

== Products and services ==
=== Online data-sharing platform ===
PatientsLikeMe allows members to input real-world data on their conditions, treatment history, side effects, hospitalizations, symptoms, disease-specific functional scores, weight, mood, quality of life, and more on an ongoing basis. The result is a detailed longitudinal record – organized into charts and graphs – that allows patients to gain insight and identify patterns. The data-sharing platform is designed to help patients answer the question: "Given my status, what is the best outcome I can hope to achieve, and how do I get there?" Answers come in the form of shared longitudinal data from other patients with the same condition(s), thus allowing members to place their experiences in context and see what treatments have helped other patients like them. Some communities, such as ALS, feature visual aids such as percentile curves on the patient profile, so that an individual user can see whether their rate of progression is fast, slow, or about average. A seizure tracker for patients with epilepsy helps identify triggers such as missed medication doses, sleep deprivation, or alcohol use, and a "mood map" for patients with mood disorders helps to show different factors underlying their condition such as emotional control, anxiety, or external stress while all users can look for patterns in their daily health status such as day of the week or time of day. On top of patients being able to organize their treatment, better understand and control their disease, they can access a beneficial psycho-social support network. Patients can share with their peers who have had or are going through similar experiences. Diagnosis of a long-term illness can be socially isolating as the patient is usually the only one in their family or friend group going through it. There is an experience gap between people who are diagnosed with cancer (or other long-term illness) and the ones who are not. Being social animals, this isolation often leads to anxiety and depression (related to diagnosis) which are known to undermine treatment and patient outcomes. On relation to various cancers, peer support groups of "others who have had the same or similar experiences" have been linked to reduced symptoms of depression, increase patient compliance to treatment regimens, and increased survival outcomes.

Three studies have been published suggesting that use of the platform improves patient outcomes. A survey conducted in 2010 amongst patients with ALS, MS, Parkinson's disease, HIV, fibromyalgia, and mood disorders found that 72% of users had found the site helpful in learning about a symptom they had experienced, 57% for understanding the side effects of a treatment, 42% in helping them to find another patient like them, amongst others. A second study conducted in epilepsy found that in addition to the earlier benefits reported, patients with epilepsy reported a better understanding of their symptoms (59%), seizures (58%), and symptoms or treatments (55%). The number of benefits they reported from using the site was strongly associated with the number of social connections they made with other members, dubbed the "dose effect curve of friendship". Finally, a third study conducted with the U.S. Department of Veteran Affairs and the University of California at San Francisco reported statistically significant improvements in validated measures of self-management and self-efficacy in veterans with epilepsy as a result of engaging with the site for a period of six weeks.

In 2023, the Neurological Clinical Research Institute (NCRI) at Massachusetts General Hospital collaborated with PatientsLikeMe to use the ALS data from the database to expand their Pooled Resource Open-Access ALS Clinical Trials (PRO-ACT) database. The PLM database includes information such as symptom reports from ALS patients that add data to the clinical trial.

=== Health economics and outcomes research ===
The site makes revenue by conducting scientific research studies for pharmaceutical companies, typically with an emphasis on issues that are important to both patients and industry. In 2011, a partnership with Novartis studied the barriers faced by people with multiple sclerosis in being adherent to taking their medication, which led to the development of an MS Treatment Adherence Questionnaire (MS-TAQ) which was made available to help patients and their doctors identify and address these issues through coping strategies and enhanced communication.

A 2013 collaboration with UCB explored factors underlying quality of life in epilepsy and identified a number of issues beyond the occurrence of seizures as being important, including symptoms such as problems concentrating, depression, memory problems, and treatment side effects.

In 2015, PatientsLikeMe worked with researchers at Genentech on a study inviting potential clinical trial participants to review study protocols in order to provide input and feedback to make the study more appealing.

A 2016 collaboration with Novartis published in Nature Biotechnology and Value in Health explored ways in which patients could provide systematic input into guiding drug development to help make it more patient-centered. A different study published with AstraZeneca in 2016 sought to understand the treatment expectations of women living with ovarian cancer and identified a shift from surviving with the condition to living with it. Such research helps to improve understanding of disease, identify new approaches to management, and generate ideas to improve the products and services developed by pharmaceutical companies.

=== Open Research Exchange ===
Following the award in 2013 and 2014 of $4.5m in grants from the Robert Wood Johnson Foundation, the company developed an online tool called the Open Research Exchange (ORE) that allowed for the rapid creation, prototyping, testing, and validation of patient reported outcome measures, questionnaires that can establish the impact of symptoms and disease on patients. During the period of the grant, a number of academic collaborators were invited to develop measures on the platform including measures of treatment burden, hypertension management, feelings of satiety in diabetes and treatment burden in chronic illness. The tool offers researchers the ability to rapidly get input from large numbers of patients in a matter of weeks or months as opposed to much slower forms of research which can take years to complete. A number of tools such as the Treatment Burden Questionnaire and the Suicide Ideation and Behavior Assessment Tool (SIBAT) have been published in the scientific literature for use by researchers and an editorial co-authored with industry leaders and a researcher at the FDA outlined ways in which PROs developed on the ORE could be used for the development of new medicines. In addition to the traditional scientist-lead instruments, one instrument was developed by a person living with MS. A 2016 RWJF grant for $900,000 charters PatientsLikeMe to work with the National Quality Forum to develop new measures for healthcare performance.

== Scientific work ==
A key differentiator of the site from more traditional online support groups, message boards, social media sites and list-serves is the emphasis on structured quantitative data which can be aggregated and used for research purposes. This has permitted PatientsLikeMe's research team to author more than 100 peer-reviewed published scientific articles in collaboration with academic and commercial partners in leading journals such as the BMJ, Nature Biotechnology, and Neurology. In addition, PatientsLikeMe has been mentioned by others in more than 3,000 published articles in the scientific literature and has been featured as a business case study by the Harvard Business Review. The company has also invited researchers to become embedded with the company such as an in-depth study explaining the organization of the platform and highlighting some of the challenges that social media and patient-centered research models are facing.

Wherever possible, PatientsLikeMe has a policy of publishing its research output in open access form, so that patients, clinicians, and researchers can easily access their scientific output. Instruments and questionnaires developed on PatientsLikeMe such as the MS Rating Scale or MS Treatment Adherence Questionnaire are licensed under Creative Commons so that they can be used freely by the community without complex or costly licensing requirements. The company also provides patients that take part in its studies with "givebacks" which concisely and rapidly give them feedback in lay language as to the results of research in which they have participated so they can understand how donating their data has been useful for research.

The company's best known scientific endeavor relates to an online refutation of a clinical trial in ALS. In 2008, a small Italian study was published suggesting that lithium carbonate could slow the progression of ALS. In response, hundreds of members of PatientsLikeMe with the disease began taking the drug off-label. Using the self-reported data of 348 ALS patients, PatientsLikeMe conducted a 9-month long study which demonstrated that lithium did not slow the progress of the disease. The team suggested that online collection of patient self-report data was not a substitute for randomized placebo-controlled trials, but it might be a useful new form of clinical research in certain circumstances. A later study described how patients attempted to use the same tools to unblind clinical trials in which they were enrolled to try and see whether or not the experimental drugs they were taking were working. A 2016 collaboration with Dr Rick Bedlack of the Duke ALS Clinic aims to overcome some of the burden of traditional ALS trials by allowing patients to take part in a clinical trial of a nutritional supplement, Lunasin, from their own home with just two clinic visits rather than regular monthly appointments. Participants completed "virtual visits" to record their ALSFRS-R and other health information in between initial and final on-site visits. Synthetic controls were matched to the intervention arm based on demographics and similarity scores of disease progression using algorithms developed at PLM that analyzed longitudinal ALSFRS-R data from the existing PLM population. This enabled clinicians to effectively power their study while further reducing on-site visits. This virtual model has resulted in fast and effective trial recruitment, retention, and adherence. Led by PLM, recruitment of trial participants for Duke was achieved in less than half the expected time.

== Corporate affairs and culture ==
=== Business model ===
Describing itself "a not just for profit," PatientsLikeMe does not allow advertising on its site but rather keeps the site free for users by selling research services as well as aggregated, de-identified data to its partners, including pharmaceutical companies and medical device makers. Typical commercial services include helping to optimize the designs of clinical trial protocols, developing new patient reported outcomes, or identifying the severity of symptoms in specific patient groups. The company enforces transparency about who uses the data and partners have included most of the largest pharmaceutical companies worldwide such as UCB, Novartis, Sanofi, Genentech, AstraZeneca, Avanir Pharmaceuticals and Acorda Therapeutics.

== Awards and recognition ==
In 2007, the company was named as one of the "15 Companies That Will Change the World" by Business 2.0 and CNN Money and added to the list of "Top Health IT Innovators" by FierceHealthIT . In 2008, PatientsLikeMe received the Prix Ars Electronica Award of Distinction and in March, featured in a New York Times Magazine article entitled "Practicing Patients", by Thomas Goetz, who later went on to feature the site in his book "The Decision Tree". Later in 2008, a television segment with Sanjay Gupta featuring PatientsLikeMe was aired on the CBS Evening News. Fast Company (magazine)'s 2010 list of Most Innovative Companies ranked PatientsLikeMe at #23. A May 2010 New York Times article entitled "When Patients Meet Online", outlined the platform's potential for advances for research. In 2012, Sanjay Gupta featured a research project conducted in collaboration with PatientsLikeMe on CNN's The Next List, profiling collaborator Dr. Max Little. In January 2013, the company was featured as a clue on Jeopardy! In 2016, co-founders Jamie and Ben Heywood were awarded the 2016 Humanitarian Award by the International Alliance of ALS/MND Associations. In 2017, PatientsLikeMe was named by Fast Company as one of the Top 10 Most Innovative Companies in Biotech.
