= John Paul II Medical Research Institute =

US research institute

The John Paul II Medical Research Institute is a nonprofit research institute based in the Iowa City area. It conducts research pertaining to diseases including amyotrophic lateral sclerosis, cancer and Alzheimer's disease. It was established in 2008 by pulmonologist Alan Moy, and is dedicated to medical research compliant with the pro-life movement's views that it is unethical to use embryonic stem cells for research purposes.

== Ice Bucket Challenge ==
In 2014, the popularity of the Ice Bucket Challenge, and the fact that the ALS Association conducts research using embryonic stem cells, prompted several Catholic archdioceses to encourage donations to the John Paul II Medical Research Institute instead. These archdioceses included the Archdiocese of Cincinnati, the Archdiocese of St. Louis and the Archdiocese of Dubuque. The institute reported receiving more than $15,000 in donations during the five-day period ending on August 20.
