= Augie Nieto =

American businessman (1958–2023)

- Born: February 15, 1958; Anaheim, California, U.S.
- Died: February 22, 2023 (aged 65); Newport Beach, California, U.S.
- Education: Claremont McKenna College
- Organization: Augie's Quest
- Known for: Life Fitness
- Title: Chief Inspiration Officer, Augie's Quest; Operating Advisor, North Castle Partners
- Board member of: ALS TDI; Curves International; Jenny Craig, Inc. Octane Fitness; HydroMassage
- Spouse: Lynne
- Children: 4
- Awards: Club Industry Lifetime Achievement Award; EY Supporter of Entrepreneurship Award; NAHJ President's Award

Augustine L. Nieto II (February 15, 1958 – February 22, 2023) was the founder and chief executive of Life Fitness, as well as the chairman of Augie's Quest to Cure ALS, and the ALS Therapy Development Institute. He and his wife, Lynne, lived in Corona Del Mar, California, and had four children and eight grandchildren.

He was diagnosed with amyotrophic lateral sclerosis (ALS) disease in 2005, and established "Augie's Quest to Cure ALS", which has raised over $75 million in funds for research into the disease. A documentary titled, "Augie" was released in 2017. Advances in technological communication using brain wave detection in patients with physical challenges that impacted their ability to speak was mentioned in Through the Wormhole, with Morgan Freeman Season 4, Episode 6 in 2013. Augie Nieto's involvement in helping scientists improve the technology was featured in this episode.

== Career ==
In 1977, Nieto founded Lifecycle with an exercise bike of the same name. In 1984, he sold the company to Bally Total Fitness, but was soon named president of the combined company, Life Fitness. He left as an executive of the company shortly after its acquisition by the Brunswick Corporation. In 2001, Nieto became an Operating Advisor for North Castle Partners, a private equity firm. As part of his position, he served on the boards of Curves International, Jenny Craig, and HydroMassage, all North Castle investments. Additionally, he was a former board member of Octane Fitness, Quest Software and DynaVox. As a board member of Quest Software, he was part of a committee that helped to negotiate the sale of the company to Dell in 2012.

== Augie's Quest ==
In March 2005, Nieto was diagnosed with amyotrophic lateral sclerosis, more commonly known as Lou Gehrig's disease. After diagnosis, he partnered with the Muscular Dystrophy Association (MDA) and created "Augie's Quest" with the sole purpose of finding a cure for ALS. Funds he raised went completely to research, as administrative costs were covered by MDA. In 2014, Augie's Quest officially transitioned from MDA to the ALS Therapy Development Institute, a non-profit biotech and in 2018, Augie's Quest to Cure ALS became a stand-alone non-profit. Since 2006, Augie's Quest and ALS TDI have raised over $150 million for research under Augie's leadership.

=== Five for Fighting song ===
In 2009, John Ondrasik of Five for Fighting wrote a song in Nieto's honor on his album Slice to help raise awareness and funds for Augie's Quest.

=== Sponsors ===
Corporate sponsors of Augie's Quest have included Crunch Fitness, Orangetheory Fitness, Zumba, Shea Homes, ClubCorp, Life Time Fitness, LA Fitness, Curves, Safeway, Oakley, Jenny Craig, Life Fitness, and Equinox, among other companies.

== Awards ==
Nieto received the EY Supporter of Entrepreneurship Award for the Orange County Region in 2007.

In September 2015, he received the fitness industry's top honor, the Club Industry Lifetime Achievement Award.

== Bibliography ==
- Reciprocity, Incorporated. Infinity Publishing. 2010. ISBN 978-0741456182.
- Augie's Quest: One Man's Journey from Success to Significance. Bloomsbury. 2007. ISBN 978-1596914681.
