= Live Action (organization) =

American anti-abortion non-profit organization

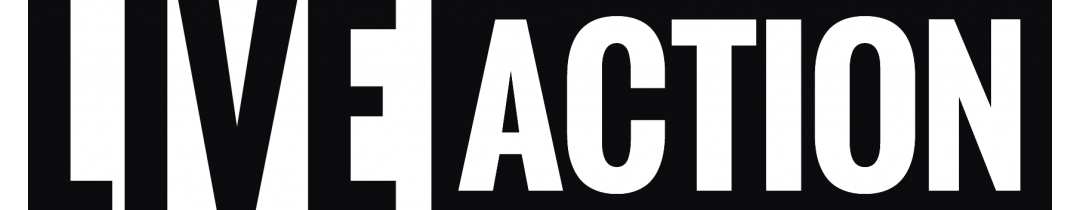
- Live Action's Logo
- Founded: 2003
- Founder: Lila Rose
- Type: 501(c)(3) non-profit
- Purpose: Anti-abortion activism
- Region served: United States
- President: Lila Rose
- Website: liveaction.org

Live Action is an American 501(c)3 non-profit anti-abortion organization founded by Lila Rose. Live Action is known for its anti-abortion activism and posting of undercover videos taken at Planned Parenthood. Live Action seeks to outlaw abortion nationwide and to defund Planned Parenthood.

== Background ==
In 2003, at the age of 15, Rose founded Live Action and began giving presentations to schools and youth groups. While a freshman at UCLA, she partnered with conservative activist James O'Keefe to conduct undercover videos of abortion providers. They conducted their first undercover video in a Planned Parenthood clinic in 2007 in Los Angeles.

== Activities ==
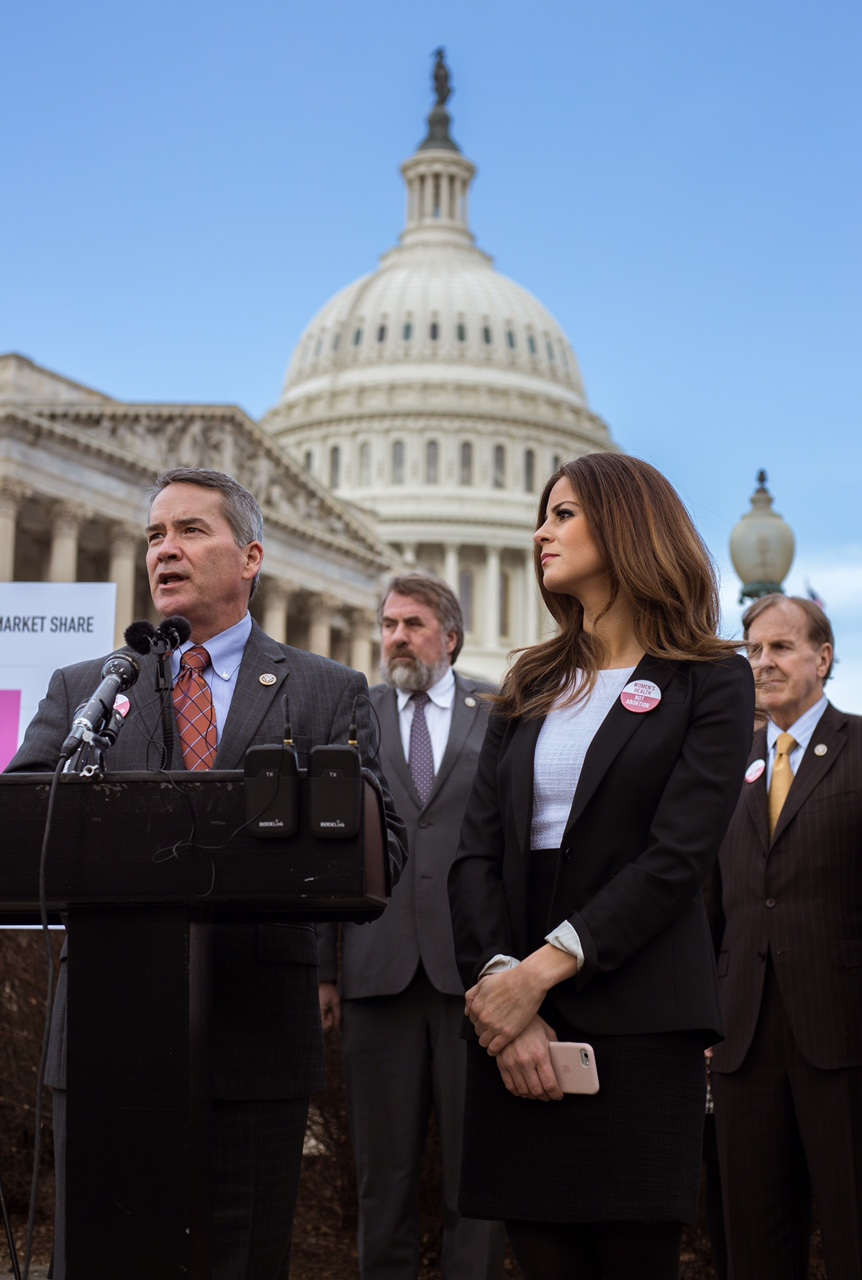
Live Action President Lila Rose, alongside Rep. Jody Hice, at a February 2017 press conference calling for the end of taxpayer funding to Planned Parenthood.

=== Undercover videos ===
In 2009, Rose posted a video of herself posing as a 13-year-old girl, impregnated by her 31-year-old boyfriend, seeking an abortion at a Planned Parenthood in Bloomington, Indiana. After the video was released, the Herald-Times reported that the aide was fired. Rose also went to a clinic in Indianapolis, Indiana, where the video appears to show a staffer informing her that she can receive an abortion in Illinois, which has no parental consent laws related to abortion. This staffer was fired too. Planned Parenthood accused the videos of the Indianapolis sting of being deceptively edited, but Rose told journalists she uploaded the full unedited video on her website. Planned Parenthood denied Rose's accusations of widespread enabling of the exploitation of minors, but acknowledged that mistakes can be made.

In 2010, Live Action released a video taken at a Planned Parenthood in Birmingham, Alabama of a woman claiming to be a 14-year-old girl seeking an abortion, impregnated by her 31-year old boyfriend. The video led to Alabama State officials putting the Planned Parenthood in question on probation for one year.

Live Action gained attention in February 2011 for undercover videos at multiple Planned Parenthood affiliates. The videos show Planned Parenthood staff counseling an investigator posing as a pimp on how to procure clandestine abortions and STD testing for his underage sex workers. According to spokespeople at Planned Parenthood, the organization reported the activities of the individuals involved to the Federal Bureau of Investigation (FBI) before the videos were made public. Neither the Justice Department nor the FBI would confirm that an investigation was launched. After the video releases, Planned Parenthood denied Live Action's allegations that they condone or support sexual slavery and statutory rape. They also fired one of the employees in question.

In May 2012, Live Action released a video showing an employee at a Planned Parenthood clinic in Austin, Texas advising a woman pretending to be pregnant and seeking an abortion if her fetus was female when she wanted a male (sex-selective abortion), that Planned Parenthood will not deny the woman an abortion no matter her reasons for wanting it. After the video was released, Planned Parenthood stated that the staffer in the video "did not follow our protocol" for dealing with "a highly unusual patient scenario," fired the employee, and stated that "all staff members at this affiliate were immediately scheduled for retraining in managing unusual patient encounters."

In the spring of 2013, Rose released a series of undercover videos documenting late-term abortion doctors' stated policy toward children born alive as the result of a failed abortion attempt. The video release coincided with intense media scrutiny of the ongoing Kermit Gosnell murder trial. These include a video where a Washington, D.C. abortion doctor, admits that he would let a child die if born alive during an abortion.

Abortion-rights commentators have accused Live Action of editing the Inhuman videos in an intentionally misleading manner, although Live Action also provides full, unedited footage for public viewing. William Saletan of Slate criticized Live Action's Inhuman videos as "orchestrated to embarrass doctors and their clinics" and edited to take out footage "showing the true complexity of abortion and the people who do it" in a video showing some of the unused clips.

In January 2017, Live Action released a video of multiple Planned Parenthood locations purportedly failing to live up to their stated mission by not offering comprehensive prenatal care. In response, a spokeswoman for Planned Parenthood stated that the organization never claimed to offer prenatal care at all of their locations.

=== Legislative ===
Live Action has advocated to deny federal and state funding to Planned Parenthood, claiming they cover up sexual abuse of children.

Following Live Action's release of undercover videos in Planned Parenthood clinics, the U.S. House of Representatives approved in February 2011 an amendment by Republican Rep. Mike Pence to cut federal funding to Planned Parenthood.

=== Social media ===
Live Action has the largest social media presence of any non-profit anti-abortion organization. The organization has been subject to restrictions from multiple social media platforms.

In 2017, Twitter restricted Live Action from advertising on the platform, flagging Live Action's content as "sensitive." In June 2019, Pinterest permanently banned Live Action for spreading "harmful misinformation, [which] includes medical misinformation and conspiracies that turn individuals and facilities into targets for harassment or violence," following allegations by Live Action that Pinterest had restricted its content by placing it on a list of "blocked pornography sites," per a whistleblower at the social media platform. Pinterest did not specify which Live Action content prompted the ban. In August 2019, Live Action sent cease-and-desist letters to Pinterest and YouTube alleging discrimination in suppressing Live Action content and videos. That same month, Facebook fact-checkers marked as "false" two Live Action videos that stated "abortion is never medically necessary." After Live Action and a group of Republican senators challenged this move as politically motivated censorship, an internal review took place and Facebook retracted the false markers on the videos.

On January 30, 2020, video-sharing social networking service TikTok banned Live Action's channel "due to multiple Community Guidelines violations" after the group posted a video of a woman choosing between an anti-abortion-rights and pro-abortion-rights pill, a meme derived from the film The Matrix. By the next day, TikTok restored Live Action's account, calling the block a "mistake" based on "human error by a moderator."

=== Protests ===
In May 2019, Live Action members held a protest in Philadelphia to rally against alleged harassment of abortion rights opponents by Representative Brian Sims in videos he made and published online.

=== Website statements ===
In July 2026, attorneys representing 13 women in Idaho who were not allowed abortions for their fetuses with fatal diagnoses sent a letter demanding that the Live Action website and its founder Lila Rose remove "false and defamatory" articles about those women from its website and post a retraction. Several of the women were part of a 2024 lawsuit challenging Idaho's abortion ban, and made public statements about their reasons for opting to end their pregnancies. The Live Action website later posted articles challenging the diagnoses or claiming that they were not dangerous, and claiming the women had other reasons for seeking abortion.
