= Treato =

Israeli-based former data analytics company

- Founded: 2007
- Defunct: 2018/08
- Headquarters: Or Yehuda, Israel
- Website: treato.com

Treato was an Israeli-based data analytics company known for providing health-related insights to patients, caregivers, healthcare professionals (HCPs), hospitals and pharmaceutical companies. Treato was owned by Jackie NousNous. It was shut down in August 2018.

== History ==
Treato was founded in 2007 as a research and development company with its headquarters located in Or Yehuda, Israel.

Treato commenced commercial offering availability in 2011 with offices in New York City and Princeton, New Jersey. It shut down in August, 2018 as it was unable to secure sufficient funding or get an acquisition offer, and remains in a state of insolvency.

== Products and services ==
Treato offered health data asset products and IQ services to pharmaceutical companies, healthcare marketing/advertising agencies, and other healthcare organizations. The company's social online portal served as a platform where users could search for information about medications, health conditions and medical treatments.
