= Project MinE =

Project MinE is an independent large scale whole genome research project that was initiated by 2 patients with amyotrophic lateral sclerosis and started on World ALS Day, June 21, 2013.

The symptoms of amyotrophic lateral sclerosis are caused by degeneration of motor nerve cells (motor neurons) in the spinal cord, brainstem, and motor cortex. The exact cause of this degeneration is unknown but it is thought that environmental exposures and genetic factors play a role in susceptibility to the disease. In 5-10% of patients the family history is positive for ALS. However, it is not always possible to establish the mode of inheritance in each pedigree and not all familial cases may suffer from a genuine Mendelian or monogenic disorder. Autosomal-dominant mutations in the C9orf72 and the SOD1 gene are found in a substantial number of familial ALS cases. Mutations in other genes (such as VAPB [2], ANG, TARDBP and FUS) have been reported, but are found at a much lower frequency and with variable penetrance, suggesting the involvement of other genes.

Project MinE is a research project to systematically interrogate the human genome for both common and rare genetic variation in ALS (genetic "data mining" explains the project name). The project consists of two phases and combines a genome-wide association study (GWAS) study with whole genome sequencing:

- Phase 1 of Project MinE consists of whole genome sequencing of 300 DNA samples of ALS patients to detect relevant haplotypes with high fidelity (variant calling & haplotype detection). Subsequently, expansion of the current GWAS for ALS will take place by increasing the amount of DNA samples to be investigated to 15,000 ALS samples and 20,000 healthy controls (so 35,000 samples in total) and imputation using the whole genome sequencing results will be performed. Combining these two processes will result that a relatively small group of whole genome sequenced DNA samples will extend the > 500,000 single nucleotide polymorphism (SNP) markers of a GWAS to 8,000,000 SNP markers and per definition will include ALS-relevant variation.
- Phase 2 of the project aims to increase the number of whole genome sequenced samples to 22,500, which includes 15,000 ALS samples and 7,500 healthy controls. High-throughput next-generation sequencing will be applied. This sample size will be large enough to reliably analyze whole genome sequencing data outside of a family context.

The long-term benefit of the approach taken for project MinE is the priceless catalogue of many non-ALS whole genomes that can be used to investigate other human diseases, including Diabetes Mellitus, some types of cancer, and other neurological disorders. Project MinE is worldwide the largest genetic study for Amyotrophic Lateral Sclerosis. The work has started in the second quarter of 2013 and is a unique international collaboration between scientists, industry, social foundations and patients. On July 25, 2016, the first results were published in 2 publications in Nature Genetics leading to the discovery of NEK1 and C21orf2 as new ALS risk genes.
