= Lila Rose =

American anti-abortion activist (born 1988)

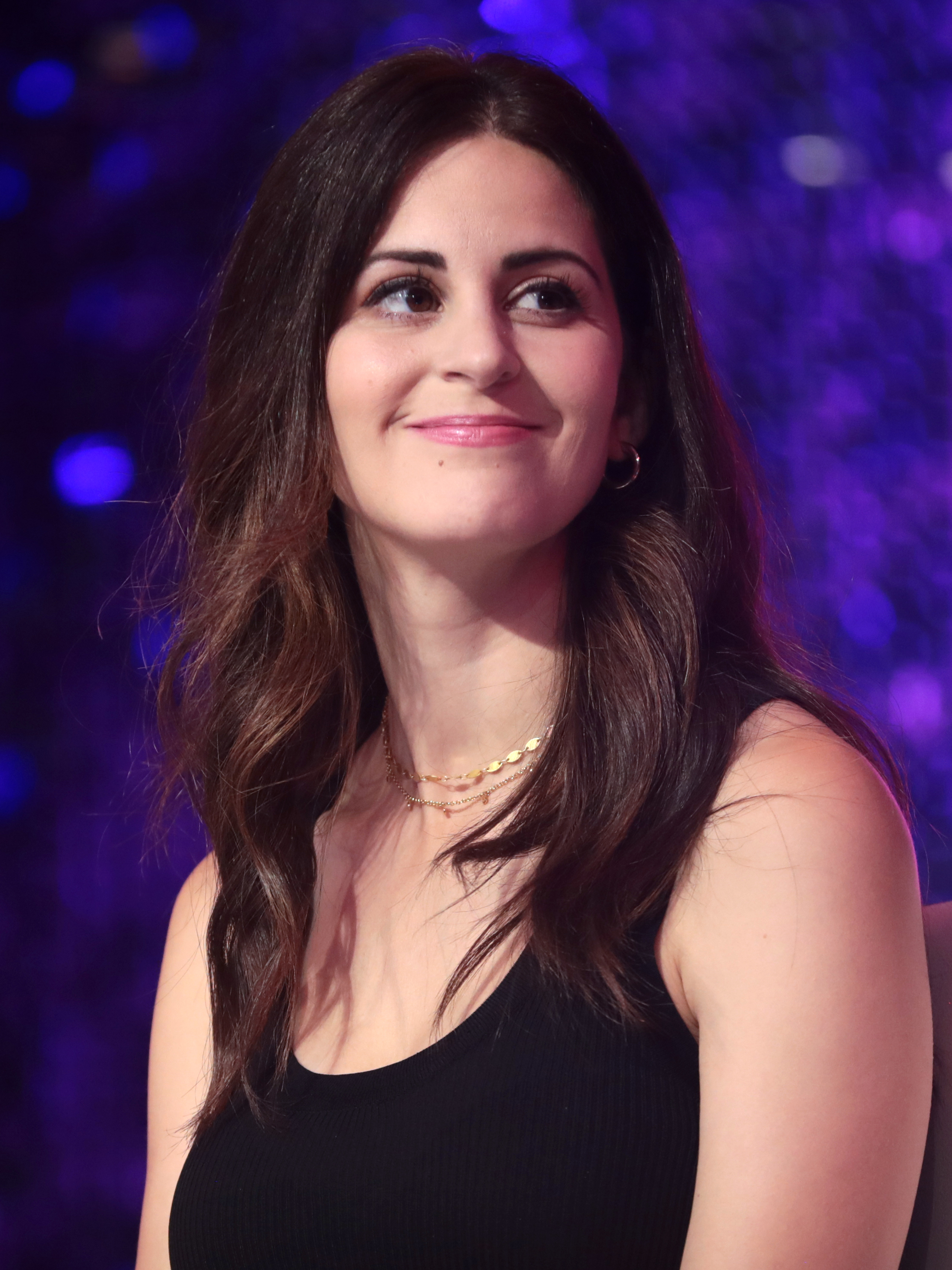
- Rose in 2022
- Born: Lila Grace Rose; July 27, 1988 (age 38); San Jose, California, U.S.
- Education: University of California, Los Angeles
- Known for: Anti-abortion activism
- Title: Founder and president of Live Action
- Spouse: Joe (m. 2018)
- Children: 3

Lila Grace Rose (born July 27, 1988) is an American anti-abortion activist who is the founder and president of the anti-abortion organization Live Action. She has conducted undercover investigations of abortion facilities in the United States, including affiliates of Planned Parenthood Federation of America.

== Early life and education ==
Rose was raised in San Jose, California, the third of eight children. She was home-schooled through the end of high school and majored in history at the University of California, Los Angeles. She was raised as evangelical Protestant and later converted to Roman Catholicism.

== Activism ==
In 2003, at the age of 15, Rose founded the anti-abortion group Live Action and began giving presentations to schools and youth groups. While at UCLA, she partnered with conservative activist James O'Keefe to conduct undercover videos of abortion providers.

Rose has concentrated her activism on Planned Parenthood and National Abortion Federation affiliates in the United States, focusing on the anti-abortion interpretation of the moral and ethical aspects of abortion and financial issues in the abortion industry. She has also highlighted the high abortion rate in the African-American community.

In 2006, Rose, as a college freshman, conducted her first undercover video investigation on abortion at UCLA's Arthur Ashe Student Health and Wellness Center. Her freshman year she also founded the anti-abortion student magazine The Advocate.

In 2007, Rose visited two Planned Parenthood facilities in Los Angeles and recorded undercover videos while purporting to be a 15-year-old girl who had been impregnated by a 23-year-old male who was accompanying her, telling staffers she did not want her parents to find out about the relationship. No employee at either clinic objected to the situation, and a receptionist at one facility "told Rose to say she was 16, because if she was 15, the clinic would have to make a report to the police." Rose has posed as an abortion-seeking teen impregnated by an older man in additional stings at Planned Parenthood clinics in Indianapolis, Bloomington, Tucson, Phoenix and Memphis. According to Politico, "Within the anti-abortion community, Rose has been widely lauded for her undercover investigations into abortion clinics."

Rose was featured in an Atlantic October 2018 original short documentary, "Meet the Face of the Millennial Anti-Abortion Movement."

In July 2019, Rose addressed the White House "social media summit" alongside President Donald Trump.

Rose has also taken a critical stance on hormonal birth control and intrauterine devices (IUDs). Through social media campaigns and interviews, Rose has made statements regarding the contraceptive methods, alleging they are "massively unhealthy" and contribute to divorce, and a "hookup culture" that can lead to abortion following contraceptive failure despite the lack of scientific evidence supporting these assertions. While medical authorities state that hormonal contraception primarily prevents ovulation, Rose and Live Action have made statements that some forms of hormonal birth control could prevent a fertilized egg from implanting in the uterus, which they consider an abortifacient. This perspective aligns with a broader strategy among some anti-abortion groups to argue for the illegality of certain contraceptives under state abortion bans that define life from the moment of fertilization. Rose has stated that if a contraceptive is "designed as an abortifacient", it should be considered an abortion and therefore illegal in jurisdictions that outlaw abortion.

== Website statements ==
In July 2026, attorneys representing 13 women in Idaho who were not allowed abortions for their fetuses with fatal diagnoses sent a letter demanding that the Live Action website and its founder Lila Rose remove "false and defamatory" articles about those women from its website and post a retraction. Several of the women were part of a 2024 lawsuit challenging Idaho's abortion ban, and made public statements about their reasons for opting to end their pregnancies. The Live Action website later posted articles challenging the diagnoses or claiming that they were not dangerous, and claiming the women had other reasons for seeking abortion.

== Accolades ==
- 2008: "Person of the Year Malachi Award" from Operation Rescue
- 2008: Awarded $50,000 in the annual "Life Prizes" awards of the Gerard Health Foundation
- 2010: "Young Leader Award" from the Susan B. Anthony List
- 2013: Named to the National Journal's list, "The 25 Most Influential Washington Women Under 35"
- 2014: Named to Christianity Today's "33 under 33"

== Personal life ==
Rose married her husband, Joe, in 2018 and has three children.

== Publications ==
- Fighting for Life: Becoming a Force for Change in a Wounded World (2021)
