= NEK3 =

Protein-coding gene in the species Homo sapiens

Identifiers
- Aliases: NEK3, HSPK36, NIMA related kinase 3
- External IDs: OMIM: 604044; MGI: 1344371; GeneCards: NEK3
Enzyme activity
EC #	BRENDA	ExPASy	KEGG	MetaCyc
2.7.11.1	↗	↗	↗	↗

Gene location (Human)
Chr.	Chromosome 13 (human)
Band	13q14.3	Start	52,132,639 bp
Band	13q14.3	End	52,159,861 bp

Gene location (Mouse)
Chr.	Chromosome 8 (mouse)
Band	8 A2|8 11.07 cM	Start	22,618,299 bp
Band	8 A2|8 11.07 cM	End	22,656,451 bp
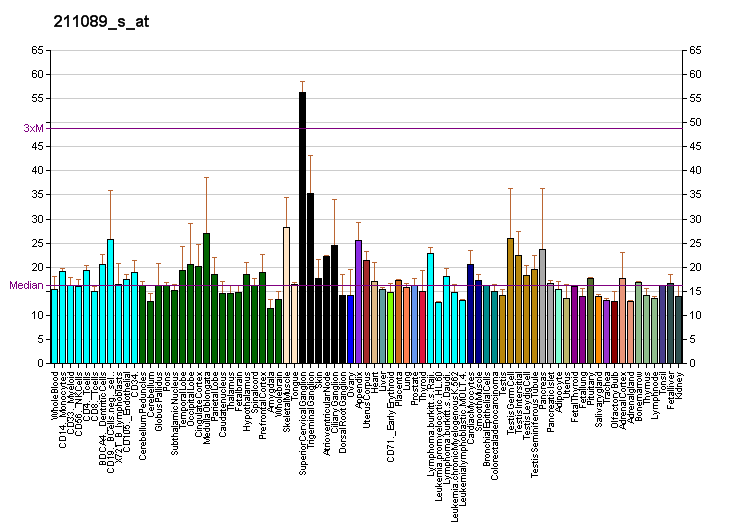

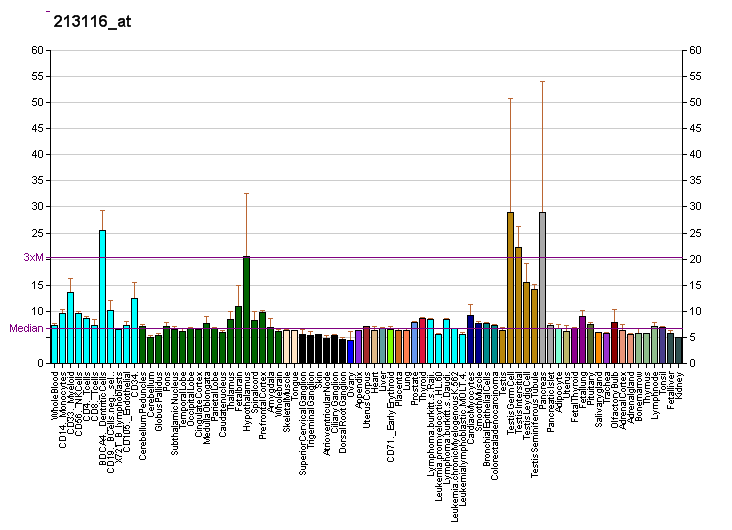
RNA expression pattern
Bgee	Human / Mouse (ortholog); Top expressed in: sural nerve; gonad; mucosa of transverse colon; testicle; right testis; left testis; C1 segment; rectum; corpus callosum; Achilles tendon / Top expressed in: fossa; medullary collecting duct; trigeminal ganglion; facial motor nucleus; superior cervical ganglion; urothelium; condyle; renal corpuscle; transitional epithelium of urinary bladder; lumbar spinal ganglion; More reference expression data
BioGPS	More reference expression data
Gene ontology
Molecular function	ATP binding; protein kinase activity; protein binding; kinase activity; metal ion binding; nucleotide binding; transferase activity; protein serine/threonine kinase activity
Cellular component	cell projection; axon; nucleus; cytoplasm
Biological process	establishment of cell polarity; cell cycle; phosphorylation; cell division; neuron projection morphogenesis; regulation of tubulin deacetylation; protein phosphorylation; mitotic cell cycle
Sources:Amigo / QuickGO
Orthologs
Databases	NCBI: entry; OMA: entry
Species	Human	Mouse
Entrez	4752	23954
Ensembl	ENSG00000136098	ENSMUSG00000031478
UniProt	P51956	Q9R0A5
RefSeq (mRNA)	NM_001146099; NM_002498; NM_152720	NM_001162947; NM_011848
RefSeq (protein)	NP_001139571; NP_002489; NP_689933	NP_001156419; NP_035978
Location (UCSC)	Chr 13: 52.13 – 52.16 Mb	Chr 8: 22.62 – 22.66 Mb
PubMed search
- Wikidata
View/Edit Human	View/Edit Mouse

Serine/threonine-protein kinase Nek3 is an enzyme that in humans is encoded by the NEK3 gene.

In Aspergillus nidulans, lack of the serine/threonine kinase NimA (never in mitosis A) results in cell cycle arrest in G2, while overexpression causes the premature onset of mitotic events. The protein encoded by this gene is similar in sequence to the Aspergillus nidulans protein and may therefore play a role in mitotic regulation. However, the encoded protein differs from other NimA family members in that it is not cell cycle regulated and is found primarily in the cytoplasm. Three transcript variants have been found for this gene, but the full-length nature of only two of them has been characterized.
