= Stephen Heywood =

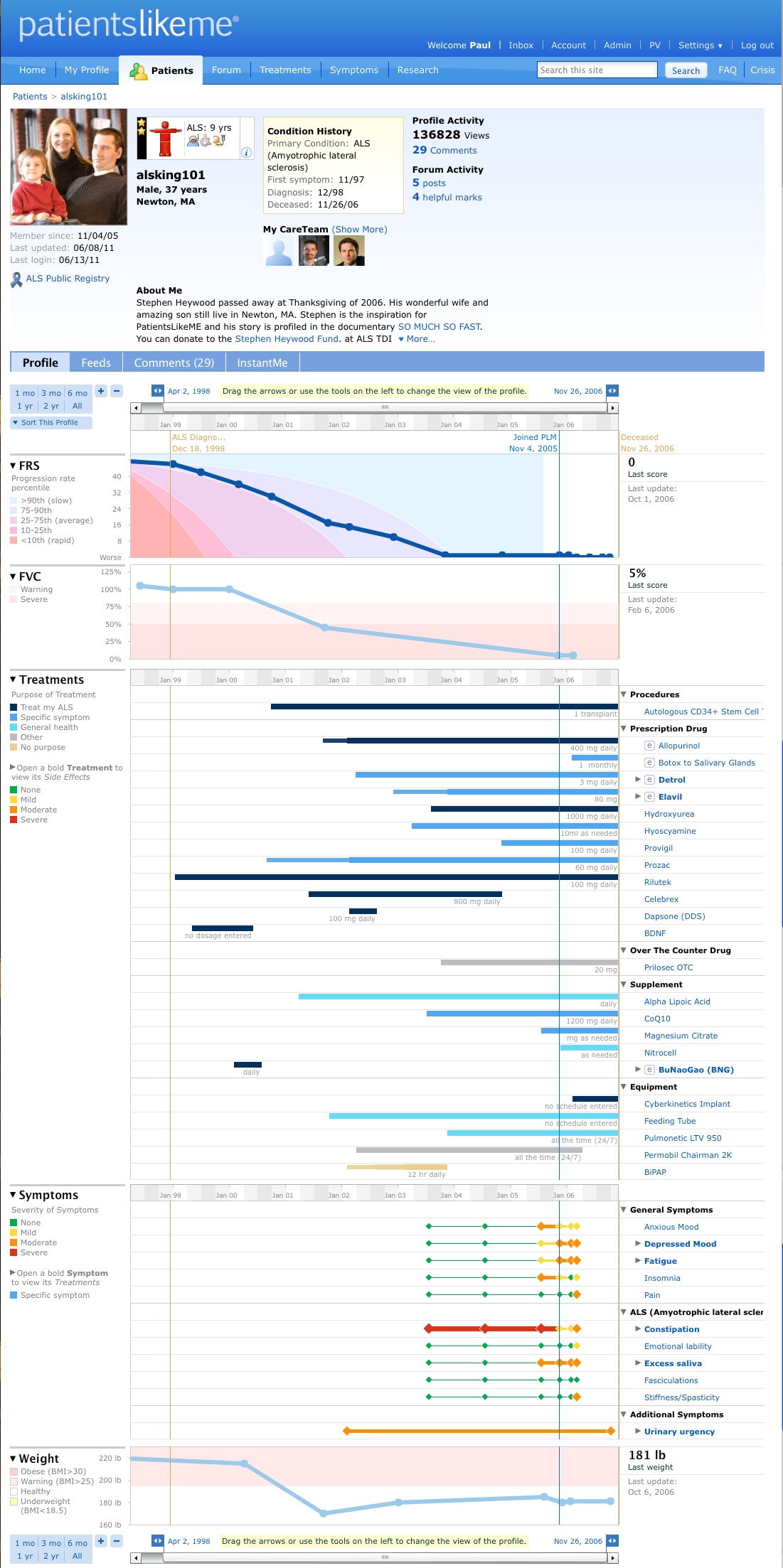
Heywood's profile on the website PatientsLikeMe, set up by his brother and a friend to help people with ALS

Stephen Heywood (April 13, 1969 – November 26, 2006) was an American builder and self-taught architect, specializing in the renovation of old houses.

He was diagnosed with ALS in 1998, at the age of 29. He was the subject of His Brother's Keeper: A Story from the Edge of Medicine, written by the Pulitzer Prize-winning author Jonathan Weiner, and the documentary film So Much So Fast, which premiered at the 2006 Sundance Film Festival.

His brothers James Heywood and Benjamin Heywood are co-founders of a website for patients with ALS and other life-changing illnesses, PatientsLikeMe; his father is the engineering professor John B. Heywood.

Heywood lived in Newton, Massachusetts, with his wife and son until his death at age 37 from an accidentally detached respirator in November 2006.
