= Jamie Heywood =

American MIT mechanical engineer (born 1966)

- Born: James Heywood; October 4, 1966 (age 60); London, England
- Education: Massachusetts Institute of Technology
- Known for: PatientsLikeMe; ALS Therapy Development Institute; AOBiome

James Heywood (born October 4, 1966, in London, England) is an American MIT mechanical engineer who founded the ALS Therapy Development Institute (ALS TDI) with his family when his younger brother Stephen Heywood was diagnosed with amyotrophic lateral sclerosis (ALS) in December 1998.

== ALS Therapy Development Institute ==
Conceived while James Heywood was moving cross country in March 1999 to be with his family, ALS TDI became the world's first non-profit biotechnology company and pioneered a new model for accelerating translational research by directly hiring scientists to develop treatments outside of the academic and for-profit corporate architecture. The institute's initial approach focused on gene therapy and stem cells and ALS TDI was the first to publish on the safety of the use of stem cells in ALS patients. ALS TDI then pioneered a novel high-throughput in-vivo validation program that tested more treatments in preclinical studies than all other labs combined and led to two drugs being tested in clinical trials. The culmination of this work is a paper published in the journal "Amyotrophic Lateral Sclerosis" that identified crucial errors present in many existing preclinical studies that could lead to false positive results. The results suggested that false positive results may rest with the methods used by researchers and not the models themselves. The paper has clear clinical implications, as ALS TDI was unable to replicate a number of prior animals studies from the field that led to clinical trials that ultimately failed in humans.

Stephen Heywood died in the fall of 2006 when his ventilator accidentally disconnected shortly before ALS TDI began a comprehensive program to use industrial discovery approaches to understand the disease. In August 2007, after serving as ALS TDI's CEO for nine years and having raised $50m in funding, Heywood stepped down and joined the Institute's board of directors. He retains the title "Alex and Brit d'Arbeloff Founding Director" in honor of their support and involvement in the creation of ALS TDI. The drug tegoprubart, invented at ALS TDI, has successfully completed Phase 2a clinical trials in ALS.

== PatientsLikeMe ==
In 2005, Heywood joined his youngest brother Ben and longtime friend Jeff Cole to found PatientsLikeMe. PatientsLikeMe operates disease-specific communities and allows for dialogue between patients about how to improve care and accelerate research.

PatientsLikeMe is a privately funded company that aggregates its users' health information and sells it to the pharmaceutical and medical device industry. PatientsLikeMe was named one of "15 companies that will change the world" by CNN Money. In 2019, the company was acquired by UnitedHealth Group.

== Other ventures ==
Heywood has been a founding board member of several organizations in the life sciences, including Genetic Networks, Everyone.org, AOBiome, and Alden Scientific (an AI-powered platform for integrating and comparing human biological and physiological data). He is a named inventor on 10 US Issued Patents and 5 published applications across medical informatics, psychedelics, and dermatology.

== Biographies, media, and awards ==
Heywood has been profiled by the Pulitzer Prize-winning author Jonathan Weiner, in the biography His Brother's Keeper: A Story from the Edge of Medicine. He has been profiled in The New Yorker, Wall Street Journal, New York Times Magazine, 60 Minutes II, New England Journal of Medicine, Nature Medicine and the Economist.

In 2006, So Much So Fast, an award-winning documentary chronicling Jamie and Stephen and the ALS Therapy Development Institute, premiered at Sundance Film Festival. In October 2009, Heywood gave a talk at TEDMED on his brother's condition and how it inspired him to found PatientsLikeMe. Awards include the International Alliance of ALS/MND Associations' "Humanitarian Award" in 2016, Scientific American's Worldview 100 in 2015, and the Drug Industry Association's President's Award for Outstanding Achievement in World Health in 2014.
