= ALS Therapy Development Institute =

American non-profit organization

- Abbreviation: ALS TDI
- Founded: 1999
- Founder: James Heywood; Robert Bonazoli; Melinda Marsh Heywood
- Type: non-profit biotech
- Tax ID no.: 04-3462719
- Location: Watertown, Massachusetts, United States
- Key people: Augie Nieto (chairman of the board); Steven Perrin, PhD (vice chairman of the board); Fernando Vieira, M.D. (chief executive officer and chief scientific officer)
- Affiliations: International Alliance of ALS/MND Associations
- Website: als.net

The ALS Therapy Development Institute (ALS TDI) is a non-profit biotechnology research organization focused on finding treatments for amyotrophic lateral sclerosis (ALS). With a staff including more than 30 scientists, it operates a research and development program centered on ALS.

== History ==
ALS TDI was founded as the ALS Therapy Development Foundation (ALS TDF) in 1999 by James Heywood, Robert Bonazoli, and Melinda Marsh Heywood after James' brother, Stephen Heywood, was diagnosed with the disease. Dr. Tennore Ramesh joined ALS-TDF when his sister in law was diagnosed with ALS and setup the research facility and served as Chief Scientific Officer from inception until 2003. The organization was initially funded through a donation from Stephen, as well as one from Alex and Brit d'Arbeloff. The Foundation's first therapy concept was to replace EAAT2 protein using gene therapy.

In 2004, the Foundation moved to a 16,000-square-foot (1,500 m^{2}) location in Cambridge, Massachusetts, with an in-house lab. ALS TDF constructed a biosafety level 2 lab in 2005, allowing for the expansion of "gene therapy and cell-based treatment pipelines."

In 2005, the Foundation started the Tri-State Trek, an annual 270-mile bike ride from Boston, Massachusetts to Greenwich, Connecticut. The Trek has since grown to include over 400 participants and has raised more than $7 million for research.

In 2006 the ALS patient Augie Nieto became chairman of the board. The next year, James Heywood resigned as president but joined the board and Sean F. Scott, who ALS runs in his family, replaced him. Scott worked with Nieto as well as with the Muscular Dystrophy Association (MDA) to bring together the two organizations in 2007. The collaboration allowed for MDA to match ALS TDI's annual budget for three years through Nieto's initiative, Augie's Quest, though the partnership continued after that, with MDA cumulatively providing over $36 million. The same year, the organization replaced the "Foundation" part of its name with "Institute".

The Institute received a $1.1 million grant from the U.S. Department of Defense in 2008 and an additional $1.6 million grant in 2010.

Steven Perrin, previously only chief scientific officer, was appointed CEO in 2009 following the death of Sean Scott. In 2011, the institute moved to a new 26,000-square-foot (2,400 m^{2}) facility, also in Cambridge, allowing for the hiring of more scientists and a bigger lab.

Two years later, in 2014, Augie's Quest officially transitioned from MDA to ALS TDI. The same year, ALS TDI received over $3 million through the Ice Bucket Challenge. In 2016, the Institute announced the ALS ONE partnership with Massachusetts General Hospital, Harvard Medical School, University of Massachusetts Medical School, and Compassionate Care ALS to find a treatment for ALS within four years.

In 2018, ALS TDI was the original beneficiary of the ALS Pepper Challenge, where participants eat a chili pepper. Various public figures, including Kelly Clarkson, Jimmy Kimmel, Shaquille O'Neal, Nancy O'Dell, Wolf Blitzer, the Miami Heat and Andy Cohen have participated in the challenge.

In February 2021, the ALS Therapy Development Institute moved to Watertown, Massachusetts. The new location included a lab facility allowing preclinical, clinical and transitional research to happen in one place.

In April 2021, Fernando Vieira, M.D., was appointed the chief executive officer of the ALS Therapy Development Institute by the board of directors.

On February 22, 2023, the chairman of the board, Augie Nieto, passed from ALS. In May, 2023, Augie's wife Lynne Nieto was elected to succeed him as board chair.

In February 2024, ALS TDI launched the ALS Trial Navigator, in order to help people with ALS find clinical trials they qualify for.

== Research ==
The institute has raised and spent more than $100 million on research into effective treatments for ALS and practices open-source science. After the discovery that the multiple sclerosis drug Gilenya might also be a treatment for ALS, the Institute enrolled 30 people in a Phase 2A clinical trial the drug in 2013, though it did not progress further.

ALS TDI launched the Precision Medicine Program in partnership with Denali Therapeutics in 2013 "to identify subgroups of ALS, potential treatments for them using patient data, genomics and iPS cell technology". By 2015, over 300 people had been registered and pre-screened in the program, significantly funded by money raised in the Ice Bucket Challenge.

In 2018, the Institute entered Phase I clinical trials for AT-1501, a potential treatment for ALS and Alzheimer's that blocks the activation of certain immune cells in order to protect nerves from ALS. The development of the drug allows ALS TDI to be viewed as a successful drug development organization. ALS TDI received funding from the ALS ONE partnership to develop the drug.

In 2020 the Institute Published "Type I PRMT Inhibition Protects Against C9ORF72 Arginine-Rich Dipeptide Repeat Toxicity" in Frontiers in Pharmacology with a follow-up paper in 2021 called "Hypothesis and Theory: Roles of Arginine Methylation in C9orf72-Mediated ALS and FTD" in Frontiers in Cellular Neuroscience.

In 2023, the Precision Medicine Program evolved into what is now known as the ALS Research Collaborative (ARC). The ARC Study, is an ongoing observational study that invites people with ALS and asymptomatic gene carriers to share their stories by contributing data about their family, work, medical history, and more. The ARC Data Commons, grants researchers access to over eight years of de-identified natural history data contributed by people with ALS – affording an unprecedented level of insight into this complex disease. This database will continue to grow as people with ALS contribute more data to the ongoing ALS Research Collaborative (ARC) natural history study. ALS TDI has collaborated with Google to develop two new digital biomarkers of ALS using voice recordings and accelerometer data from the ARC Study.

== See also ==
- PatientsLikeMe
