= 2025 National Book Awards =

American literary award

The 76th National Book Awards (NBA), presented at a ceremony and benefit dinner by the National Book Foundation, took place on November 19, 2025, in New York City. The ceremony included a musical performance by Corinne Bailey Rae, with Jeff Hiller giving the welcoming and closing remarks.

== Winner and nominees ==
| Category | Winner | Shortlist | Longlist |
|---|---|---|---|
| Fiction | Rabih Alameddine, The True True Story of Raja the Gullible (and His Mother) | Megha Majumdar, A Guardian and a Thief; Karen Russell, The Antidote; Ethan Rutherford, North Sun: Or, the Voyage of the Whaleship Esther; Bryan Washington, Palaver | Susan Choi, Flashlight; Angela Flournoy, The Wilderness; Jonas Hassen Khemiri, The Sisters; Kevin Moffett, Only Son; Joy Williams, The Pelican Child |
| Nonfiction | Omar El Akkad, One Day, Everyone Will Have Always Been Against This | Julia Ioffe, Motherland: A Feminist History of Modern Russia, from Revolution to Autocracy; Yiyun Li, Things in Nature Merely Grow; Claudia Rowe, Wards of the State: The Long Shadow of American Foster Care; Jordan Thomas, When It All Burns: Fighting Fire in a Transformed World | Caleb Gayle, Black Moses: A Saga of Ambition and the Fight for a Black State; Fatemeh Jamalpour and Nilo Tabrizy, For the Sun After Long Nights: The Story of Iran's Women-Led Uprising; Lana Lin, The Autobiography of H. Lan Thao Lam; Ben Ratliff, Run the Song: Writing About Running About Listening; Helen Whybrow, The Salt Stones: Seasons of a Shepherd's Life |
| Poetry | Patricia Smith, The Intentions of Thunder: New and Selected Poems | Gabrielle Calvocoressi, The New Economy; Cathy Linh Che, Becoming Ghost; Tiana Clark, Scorched Earth; Richard Siken, I Do Know Some Things | Gbenga Adesina, Death Does Not End at the Sea; Rickey Laurentiis, Death of the First Idea; Esther Lin, Cold Thief Place; Natalie Shapero, Stay Dead; Fargo Nissim Tbakhi, Terror Counter |
| Translated Literature | Gabriela Cabezón Cámara, We Are Green and Trembling (translated by Robin Myers) | Solvej Balle, On the Calculation of Volume (Book III) (translated by Sophia Hersi Smith and Jennifer Russell); Anjet Daanje, The Remembered Soldier (translated by David McKay); Hamid Ismailov, We Computers: A Ghazal Novel (translated by Shelley Fairweather-Vega); Neige Sinno, Sad Tiger (translated by Natasha Lehrer) | Jazmina Barrera, The Queen of Swords (translated by Christina MacSweeney); Saou Ichikawa, Hunchback (translated by Polly Barton); Han Kang, We Do Not Part (translated by e. yaewon and Paige Aniyah Morris); Mohamed Kheir, Sleep Phase (translated by Robin Moger); Vincenzo Latronico, Perfection (translated by Sophie Hughes) |
| Young People's Literature | Daniel Nayeri, The Teacher of Nomad Land: A World War II Story | Kyle Lukoff, A World Worth Saving; Amber McBride, The Leaving Room; Hannah V. Sawyerr, Truth Is; Ibi Zoboi, (S)Kin | María Dolores Águila, A Sea of Lemon Trees: The Corrido of Roberto Alvarez; K. Ancrum, The Corruption of Hollis Brown; Derrick Barnes, The Incredibly Human Henson Blayze; Mahogany L. Browne, A Bird in the Air Means We Can Still Breathe; Maria van Lieshout, Song of a Blackbird |

== Judges ==
=== Fiction ===
- Rumaan Alam, author of 2020 finalist Leave the World Behind
- Debra Magpie Earling, author of Perma Red and The Lost Journals of Sacajewea
- Attica Locke, author of Guide Me Home and Black Water Rising
- Elizabeth McCracken, author of The Souvenir Museum, The Giant's House, and Thunderstruck, which have all been honored by the NBA
- Cody Morrison, bookseller at Square Books

=== Nonfiction ===
- Heather Kathleen Moody Hall, proprietor of the Green Feather Book Company
- Tiya Miles, historian, professor at Harvard, and author of NBA-winning All That She Carried
- Raj Patel, journalist, filmmaker, and author of Stuffed and Starved
- Cristina Rivera Garza, author of Pulitzer prize-winning Liliana's Invincible Summer and professor at the University of Houston
- Eli Saslow, twice Pulitzer prize-winning journalist and writer-at-large for The New York Times

=== Poetry ===
- Kate Daniels, author In the Months of My Son's Recovery
- Terrance Hayes, author of 2010 NBA-winning Lighthead
- H. Melt, author of There Are Trans People Here
- Anis Mojgani, Oregon's tenth poet laureate
- Caridad Moro-Gronlier, author of Tortillera

=== Translated Literature ===
- Stesha Brandon, literature and humanities program manager at the Seattle Public Library
- Sergio Gutiérrez Negrón, Hispanic studies professor at Oberlin College and author of Los días hábiles
- Bill Johnston, Polish and French literature translator known for National Translation Award-winning translation of Pan Tadeusz
- Annette K. Joseph-Gabriel, Romance studies professor at Duke University
- Karen Tei Yamashita, professor emerita at University of California, Santa Cruz and author of I Hotel

=== Young People's Literature ===
- Cathy Berner, bookseller at Blue Willow Bookshop and former school librarian
- David Bowles, professor at the University of Texas Rio Grande Valley and author of My Two Border Towns
- candice iloh, author of 2020 NBA-finalist Every Body Looking
- Jung Kim, education professor at Lewis University
- Maulik Pancholy, actor and award-winning author best known for his role as Jonathan on 30 Rock and Baljeet on Phineas and Ferb
