= Newton North High School =

Public high school in Newton, Massachusetts

Coordinates: 42°20′43.58″N 71°12′28.20″W

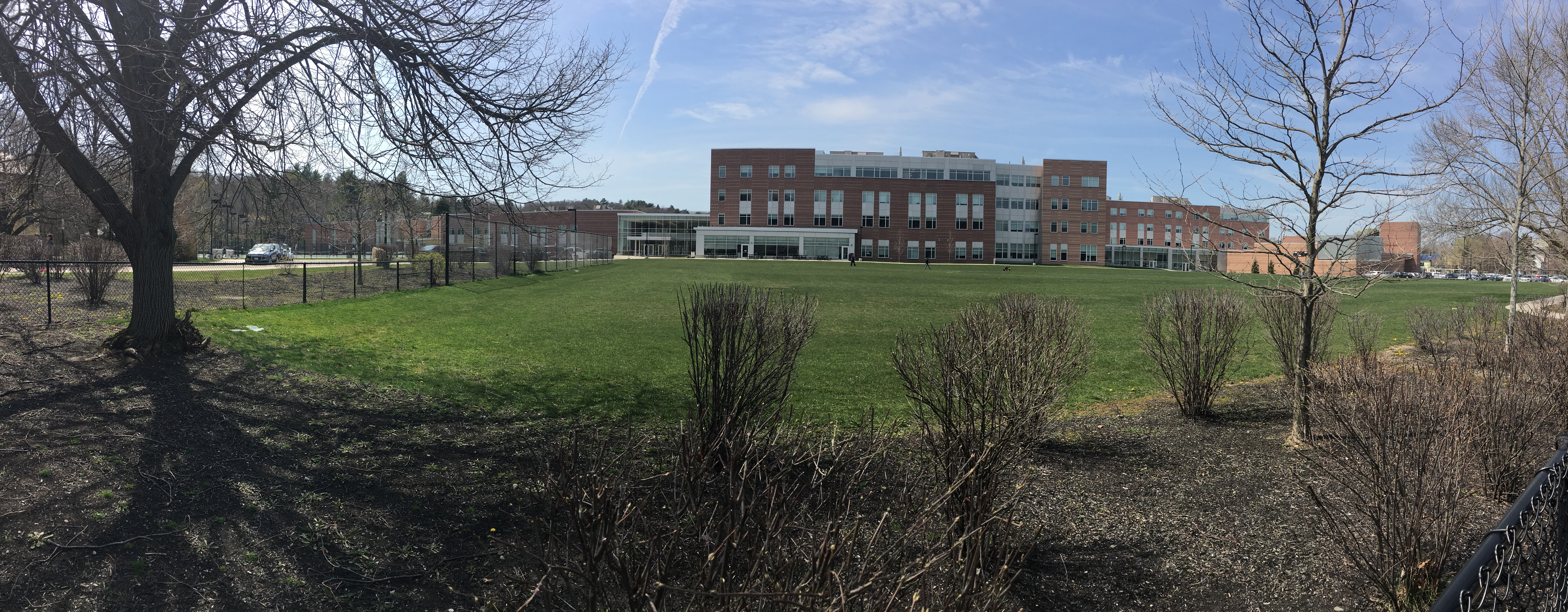

Location
- 457 Walnut Street; Newtonville, Massachusetts 02460; United States

Information
- Former name: Newton High School
- School type: Public
- Motto: Animi Cultus Humanitatis Cibus – Learning Sustains the Human Spirit
- Established: 1859; 167 years ago (as Newton High School), renamed 1973 (Newton North High School)
- School district: Newton Public Schools
- Superintendent: Anna Nolin
- CEEB code: 221–555
- Principal: Lisa Gilbert Smith (interim-principal)
- Faculty: 256
- Grades: 9–12
- Enrollment: 2,118 (2023–2024)
- Houses: Adams, Barry, Beals, Riley
- Colors: Orange & black
- Athletics conference: Bay State Conference
- Mascot: Tiger
- Accreditation: New England Association of Schools and Colleges
- Newspaper: The Newtonite – thenewtonite.com
- Yearbook: The Newtonian
- Website: nnhs.newton.k12.ma.us

Newton North High School, formerly Newton High School, is the larger and longer-established of two public high schools in Newton, Massachusetts, United States, the other being Newton South High School. It is located in the village of Newtonville. The school from 2009 to 2010 underwent controversial reconstruction of its facility, making it one of the largest and most expensive high schools ever built in the United States, with a price tag of nearly $200 million. The new building opened for classes in September 2010.

== History ==
In the 1850s, high school classes in Newton were conducted in buildings shared with grammar schools in the villages of Newton Centre, West Newton, Upper Falls, and Newton Corner. In 1859, Newton's population topped 8,000 residents for the first time, a threshold that required the town under Massachusetts state law to construct a separate high school. Newton High School's first principal was J.N. Beals, for whom the current Beals House was named. Beals also served as one of the new school's two teachers, along with Amy Breck. Beals left the job for health reasons after only one year and was replaced by E.D. Adams, for whom the current Adams House was named.

The first Newton High School building, located on Walnut Street in Newtonville, opened in September 1859, and was modified in 1875. In 1898, the original building was replaced with a new building, also on Walnut Street. This building, the Classical Newton High School, eventually became known as Building I. The next building (Building II, circa 1906) was the Vocational High School, and the third building of the Newton High School complex (Building III) opened in 1926 on Walnut Street. A field house/gymnasium building (also known as "the drill shed"), adjacent to Building I, was also part of the complex, as were the athletic fields. Buildings I, II, and III were connected to each other via a series of maintenance tunnels. Newton High School was Newton's only public high school for more than 100 years until 1960, when Newton South High School opened.

Newton High School was renamed Newton North High School in 1973 when a new building opened on Lowell Avenue. The first graduating class as "Newton North High School" was in the spring of 1974. After Newton North was built, all of the former "Newton High School" buildings were demolished.

=== Reconstruction ===
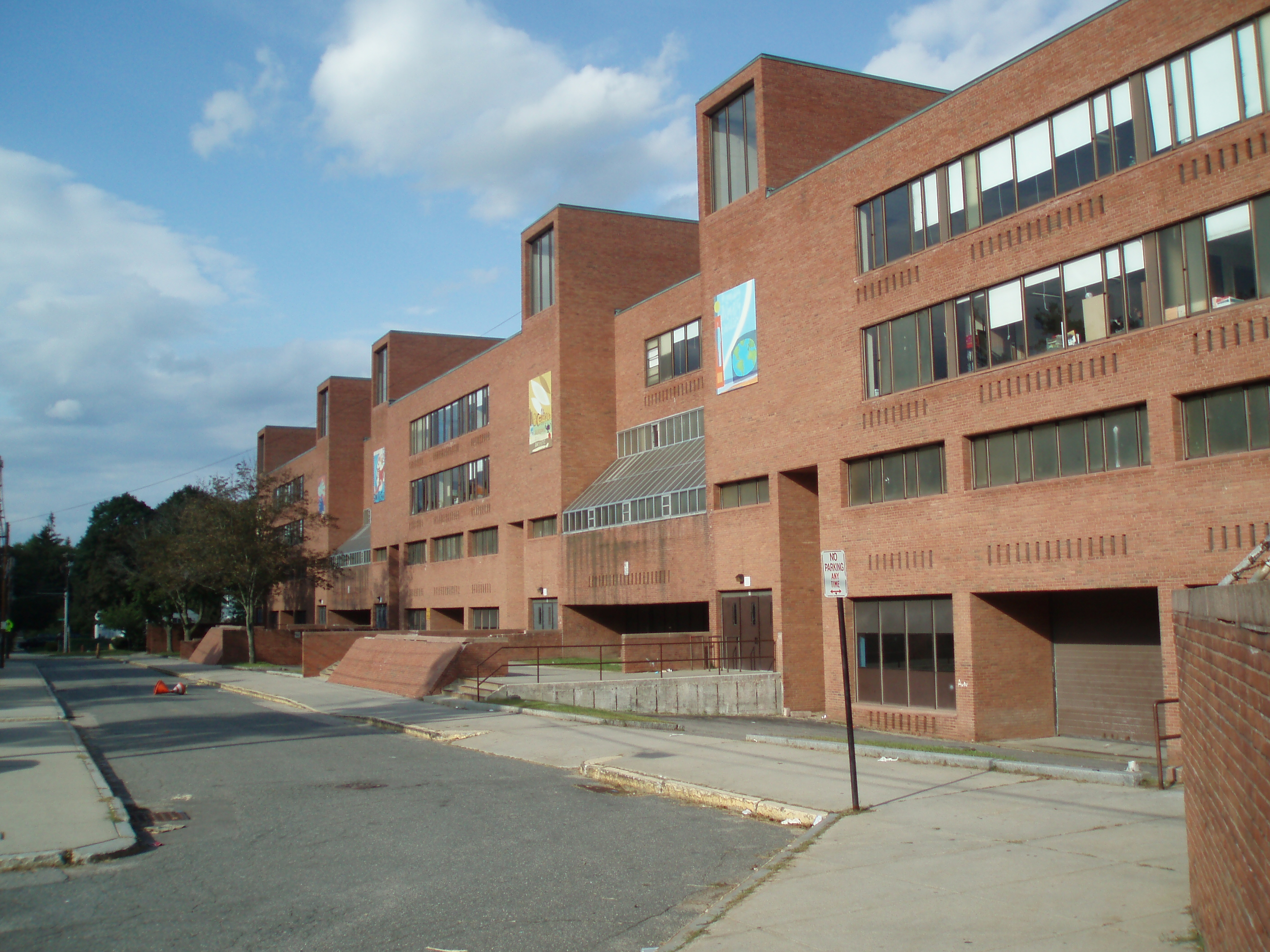
The old building at 360 Lowell Avenue

By 2003, the "old" Newton North building was 30 years old and aging poorly, with leaks, poor ventilation and crumbling stairs. After extensive community debate and a citizen review panel, a decision was reached to construct a replacement high school, with the final cost ultimately totaling $197.5 million, making it one of the most expensive high schools ever built in the state. A project consultant explained that the project's relatively high cost was partly due to demolition of the existing 450,000-square-foot (42,000 m^{2}) building, hazardous material abatement in the existing building (asbestos had been found in the building as early as 1977). and the new school's complex program, which includes a natatorium, vocational technology education program, and culinary arts facilities.

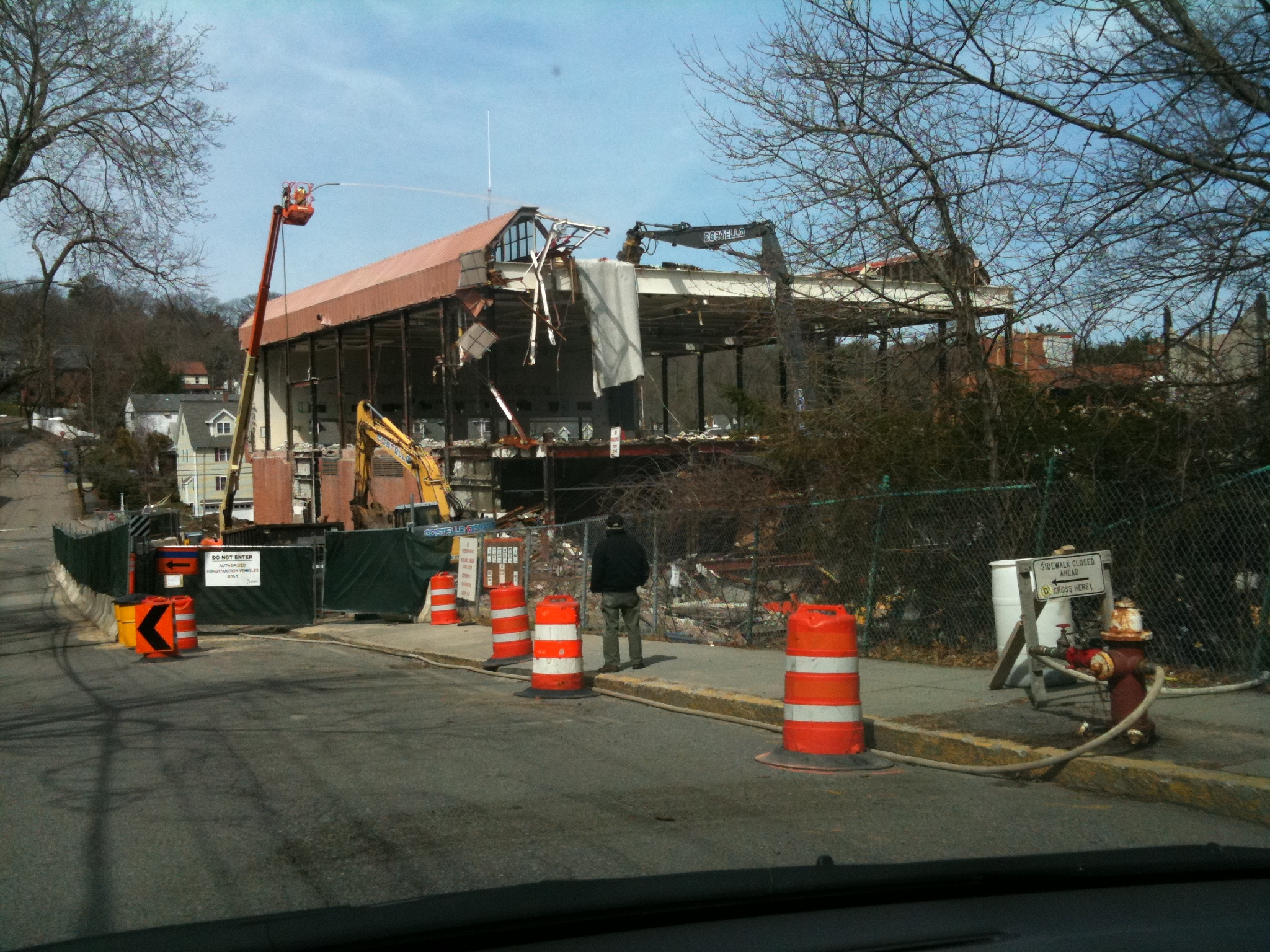
Old building being dismantled

At a public hearing in June 2006, community residents criticized the plan for its cost and for creating a new four-way intersection at Walnut Street and Trowbridge Avenue. Others claimed the proposed north–south orientation and lack of a basement level would waste energy as compared to the current structure. Nonetheless, after a public referendum and vote in January 2007, Newton residents approved the current plan for a new building.

Gund Partnership designed the new building, and Dore and Whittier Architects was the Architect of Record. Dimeo Construction Company was the construction manager and general contractor for the project. The removal of the asbestos, laden throughout the existing building, was priced at $10 million. The building was dismantled, with contaminated construction debris packaged in lined cardboard boxes and shipped out in 650 trailer loads.

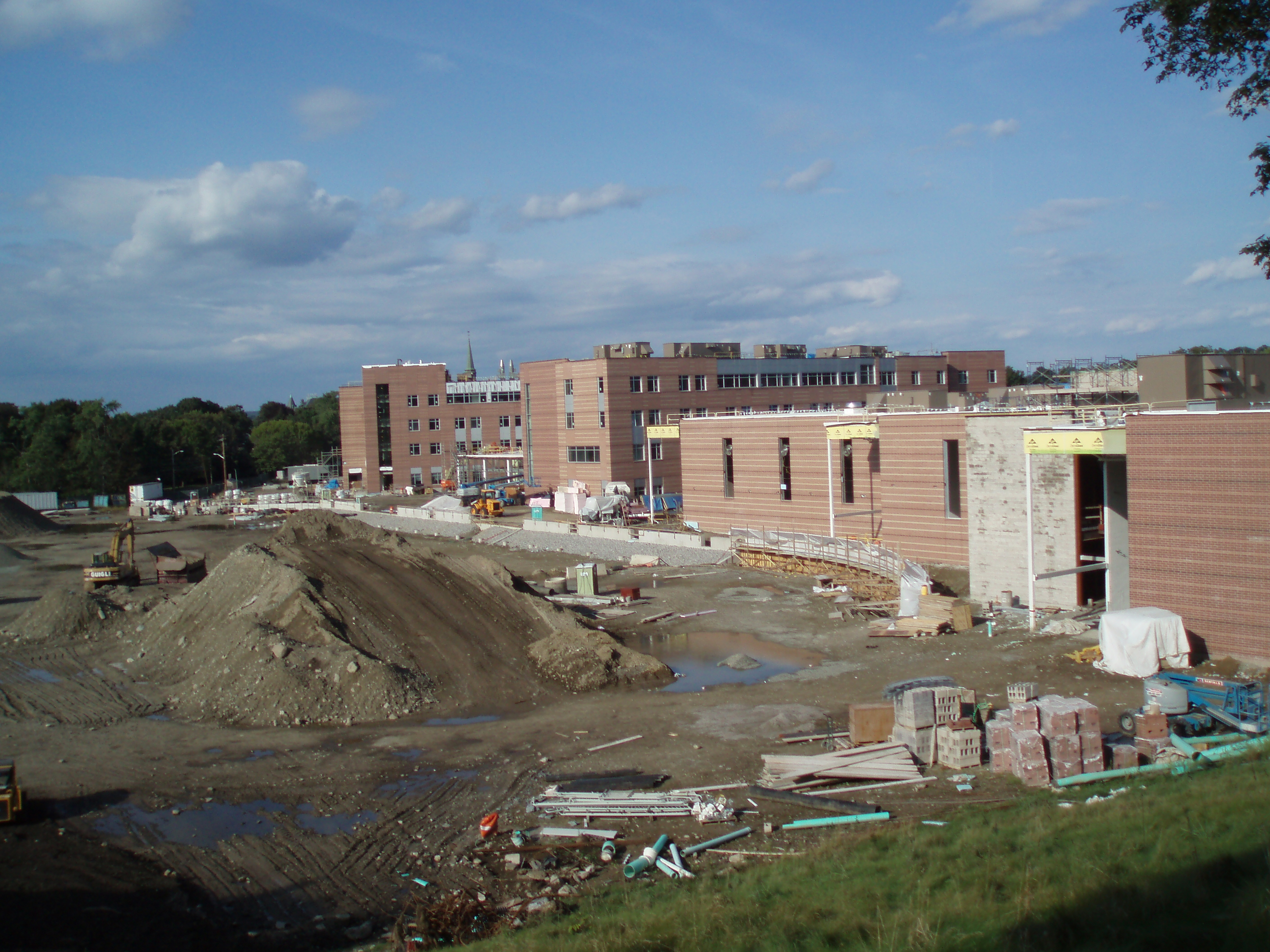
The construction site of the new Newton North in September 2009

The new building is oriented on a north–south axis on the eastern side of the current lot, with athletic fields to the west and a soccer field on the east side. The main entrance has returned to Walnut Street, as was the case from 1859 to 1973. The new building places the school office in a more accessible location – it was on the third floor in the old building – and ensures that most classrooms have natural light and windows to the outside.

The 413,000-square-foot (38,400 m^{2}) school incorporates many features that improve energy efficiency, and is among the first LEED-certified schools in the state. Green features include rooftop solar panels, systems to reuse rainwater, interior materials with low emission of volatile organic compounds, and occupancy motion sensors. Unlike the previous school building, where 50 percent of the classrooms did not have windows or access to daylight, classrooms in the new school receive natural light; light fixtures are dimmed based on the amount of daylight to conserve energy. In 2020, solar canopies were constructed over the main parking lots.

== House system ==
The school is divided into administrative units called "Houses". Each has its own office, secretary, and Dean (formerly "Housemaster"), who deals with administrative and disciplinary matters for house students. The House system was designed to provide better communication, distributed administration, more personal attention to individuals, a smaller peer group for students, more practical social events, and intra-house athletic teams. The houses are Adams, Barry, Beals and Riley, with each year group occupying one house. In the period of its largest population (≈3,000 students in the 1960s and later), there were six houses – the two additional houses being Bacon and Palmer – which also contained student common rooms and teachers' lounges. Originally, students in the same class were broken up into different houses; now the four houses correspond to the four grade levels. Students remain in the same house throughout their four years at Newton North. Houses are named for notable former principals, such as Dr. Leo J. Barry, J.N. Beals, and E.D. Adams.

== Academics ==
Newton North offers both traditional college-preparatory academic courses along with technical and vocational training. Traditional courses in the humanities and the sciences are streamed, often with College Prep, Advanced College Prep, Honors and Advanced Placement options. Starting with the 2014–2015 school year, course levels were renamed to College Prep (formerly CII), Advanced College Prep (formerly (CI), and Honors/Advanced Placement (no change). Non-standard courses include video production, architecture, automobile repair, and biodiesel production.

Currently there are 5 levels of Classes; No Level, College Prep (CP), Advanced College Prep (ACP), and Honors(H). Additionally for some classes there is Advanced Placement (AP) that falls under the Honors umbrella, additionally there is an Accelerated form of ACP that is only found in the Mathematics department.

Newton North held the sixth position in Boston Magazine's 2010 rankings of public high schools.

=== Greengineering ===
During the academic year of 2009/2010 a Greengineering course was added in the Career and Tech. Ed. Department at Newton North High School. The course taught students how to produce biodiesel, make fused plastic bags, and grow algae that would later be processed into fuel. The biodiesel was sold to a recycling company as well as the community at large. This program was the first of its kind in both Massachusetts and the United States. Greengineering was renewed for the academic year of 2010/2011 with additions to curriculum for Greengineering 101 and a new Greengineering 201 course. They had started creating a styrofoam type material using mycelium. They planned to use it to replace the need for non-green styrofoam and to create a surfboard made of fiberglass-coated mycelium. During the 2016–2017 school year, Greengineering had multiple new subject areas including pedal power and aquaponics. However, in the beginning of the 2018 school year, Greengineering came to an end and was replaced with a new Sustainability course.

=== Partnerships and exchanges ===
Students studying foreign languages have the opportunity to participate in one of several international exchange programs. In addition, Newton North participates in the Newton-Beijing Jingshan School Exchange Program. The city of Newton hosts students and teachers for four months each fall and sends students and teachers to Beijing each spring.

== Extracurriculars ==
=== Clubs and societies ===
Competitive clubs at the school include History Team, Model United Nations, Mock Trial Team, Debate Team, Mathematics Team, Science Team, and a FIRST Robotics Competition team: The LigerBots 2877. Newton North's Science Team has entered national and regional competitions. Newton North's History Team has won several regional history bees and was ranked 10th out of 186 teams in the IAC 2026 Varsity National History Bowl.

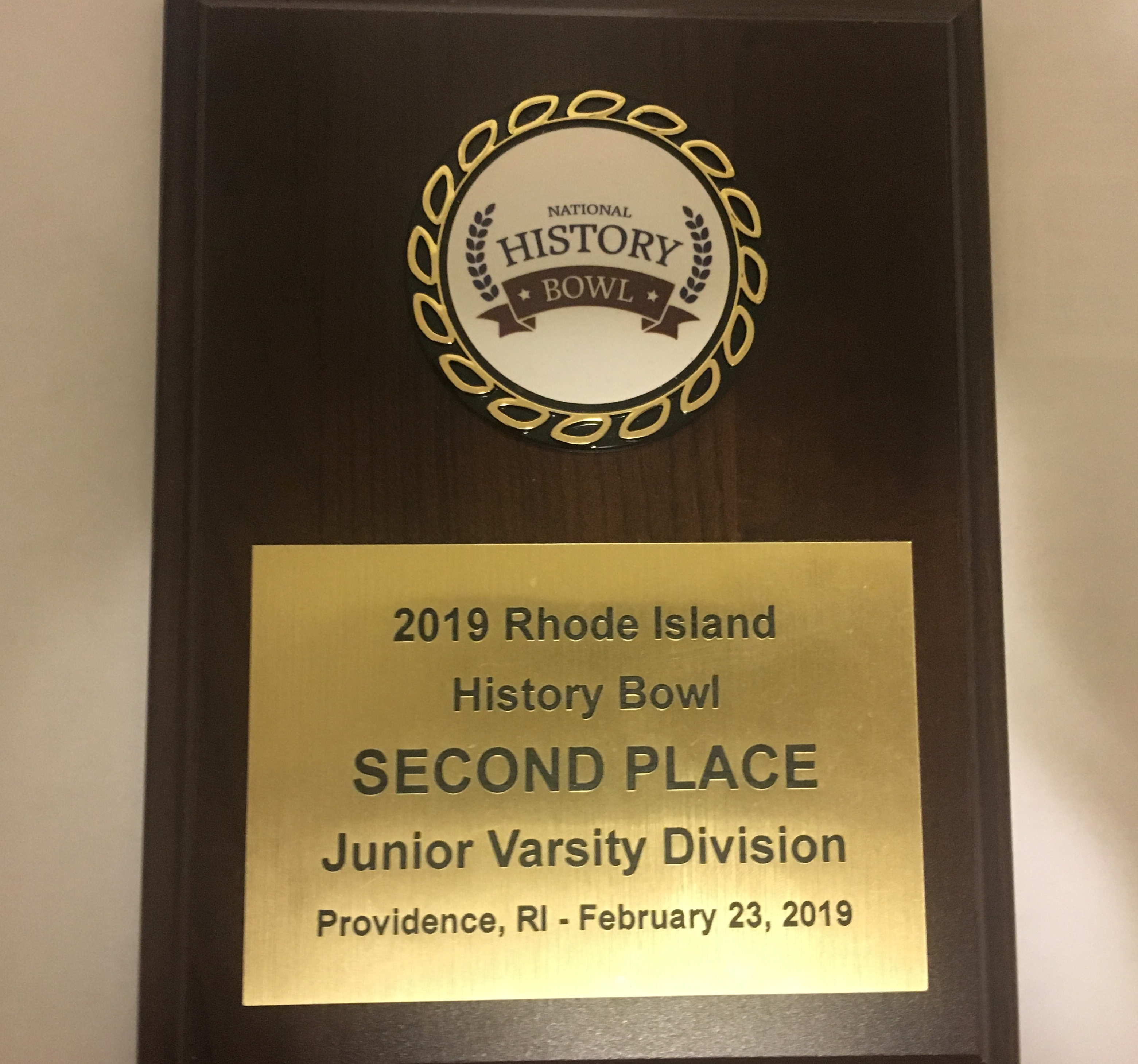
Award plaque of NNHS' History Team from the 2019 History Bowl. The team has received other plaques, including a first place plaque from the New Hampshire regional tournament.

In the 2011–12 school year, the science team placed first at MIT Trivia, Envirothon, and JETS. In 1993 the team's Science Bowl division won the state championship and placed 3rd nationally. They won the Science Olympiad State competition in 1995, 2004, 2007, 2008, and 2009, and have represented Massachusetts at the national competition.

In the 2013–14 school year, the LigerBots won the WPI District Competition, were finalists at the Northeastern University District Competition, and placed for the FIRST Championship in St. Louis. In the 2014–15 school year, the LigerBots were semi-finalists and Chairman's Award winners at the UMass Dartmouth Competition, were finalists at the Northeastern competition, won the NE Regional Chairman's award, and placed for the FIRST World Championship in St. Louis. In the 2015–2016 school year, the LigerBots won the Entrepreneurship Award at the WPI competition, as well as the Innovation in Control Award at both the Boston University District Competition and the New England District Championship competition. In the 2017–18 school year the team won the Imagery Award and Engineering Inspiration Award at the district level, and qualified for the FIRST World Championships.

The Chess Club has sent teams of four players to the tournament yearly for the past two decades. The school team won the championships in 2002, 2009, 2010, and 2012. In 2016 they placed second to two-time champions Lincoln-Sudbury Regional High School. In 2018, they once again placed second after losing in the final round to the eventual champions BBN, 1.5–2.5. The last time an individual player has won the state title was Jacob Fauman in 2012.

=== Student publications ===
Newton North publishes a monthly student newspaper, The Newtonite, founded in 1922. The paper has a circulation of 2000 issues. Students contribute to the paper through credited journalism courses. The Newtonite has won crowns from the Columbia Scholastic Press Association – the Gold Crown in 2001, and the Silver Crown in 2002 – among other scholastic journalism awards. Students also design and publish The Newtonian, the school's yearbook, which printed its 101st edition in 2011. Thoughtprints, published once a year, is the school's student-run literary magazine, featuring only student submissions. In 2010, the magazine included a CD of student-written music for the first time.

Tiger Magazine is Newton North's video production class' monthly cable television program. It airs on Newton's NewTV local cable station. The content of the program is generally a mixture of comedy pieces, news, and community based documentary, as well as experimental and dramatic video works. Several Tiger Magazine alumni have gone on to pursue careers in the film industry, and numerous pieces originally aired on Tiger Magazine have won awards in local and national video contests. Near the end of the 2011–2012 school year, the name of the show was changed to Tiger Tube. Post-COVID, the Youtube show was renamed the NNUPDATE and switched to a bimonthly schedule.

=== Athletics ===
Newton North competes in the Bay State League with other suburban Boston public schools. Since 1894, the boys' football team has played rival Brookline High School in the traditional Thanksgiving Day game. This is one of the oldest high school football rivalries in Massachusetts.

Newton North offers football, boys' and girls' soccer, boys' and girls' track and cross country, boys' and girls' basketball, boys' and girls' volleyball, boys' and girls' swimming & diving, golf, baseball, softball, boys' and girls' lacrosse, field hockey, alpine skiing, Nordic skiing, tennis, and many other sports.

==== Track and field ====
The track teams at Newton North have remained some of the top teams in the state since the inception of state-level competition. Beginning with Newton High School's first state title in 1922, the boys' track teams have won the Division I / Class A state championship 24 times outdoors and 15 times indoors, including Newton High School's record streak of eight in a row (1952–1959). Massachusetts added an additional all-state meet including all divisions in the 1960s outdoors and 1980s indoors; Newton North has subsequently won all-state titles in 1977, 2002, 2004, 2005, 2013, 2016, 2017 and 2018. The 2004–05 season featured both Division I and All-State titles in cross-country, indoor track, and outdoor track which completed a "Triple Crown" of championships. That year also featured a victory at the Penn Relays in the high school distance medley championship, which was the first relay victory by a Massachusetts high school in almost 50 years. In 2011, the Newton North sprint medley relay team and its four members were named All-American by the National Scholastic Sports Foundation. Newton High/Newton North athletes have won a high school national title (Warren Wittens in the 1936 intermediate hurdles; Carla Forbes in 2012 in the long jump and triple jump; Nick Fofana in 2014 in the decathlon Andrew Mah in 2018 in the 5000), an NCAA title (Carl Shine in the 1959 shot put), and run a four-minute mile equivalent (Tom Carleo ran 3:41 for 1500 and competed at the 1988 Olympic trials).

The Newton North girls' track teams have had their share of championships as well and have consistently been one of the top high school track teams in the state, winning Division I / Class A titles in 1989, 1990, 1992, 1996, 1998, 2004, 2005, 2010, 2011, 2012, and 2013. Additionally, they captured the All-State title in 1990, 1992, 1998, 2004, 2005,2010, 2011, 2012, and 2013. Along with those successes, they won more than 40 Conference and League Championships in the past 22 years. Their top-scoring athlete at state competition, Tanya Jones, won eleven individual Division I championships in the 300, 400, high jump, and long jump, and is the only athlete from either Newton North or Newton South high schools to score over 100 points at the state division / class meet level. Post-high-school, distance star Liz Natale finished 2nd at the 1986 NCAA Division I championship in the 3000m and was an All-American six times for University of Texas. The program has also had dozens of Nike All-Americans and New Balance All-Americans over the past ten years.

==== Other sports ====
The girls' soccer team has won five Division 1 State Championships, in 1989, 1992, 1996, 1999, and 2013, ranking as one of the top teams in the country.

The boys' basketball team won the 2005 and 2006 Division 1 State Championships, and is considered one of the state's top basketball programs. They have captured the Bay State Championship five years in a row since 2004.

The Newton North's boys' gymnastics team won four consecutive state championships from 1997 to 2000.

The boys' tennis team won the Division 1 State Championship in 2002. In the spring of 2007, tennis doubles team Dan Razulis and Mike Greene won the MIAA State Doubles tournament.

The boys' lacrosse team won three state championships from the years 1992–1996, ranking as one of the top teams in the country.

In 2005–06, the boys' football team won the Bay State league championship and went on to the Division 1A State Championship super bowl.

In 2006 and 2007 the boys' volleyball team won the sectional title and went on to the Division 1 State Championship.

In 2014, the boys' baseball team won the Division 1A state title by winning the first MIAA Super 8 state tournament.

The girls' volleyball team won back-to-back state championships in 2017 and 2018, and in 2018 was honored by the MaxPreps Tour of Champions as one of the top 50 high school teams in the country.

In 2024, the boys' soccer team won the MIAA Division 1 State Championship, completing one of the most improbable Cinderella runs in Massachusetts high school sports history. Entering the 45-team state tournament as the 31st ranked team, the Tigers defeated the 34th, 2nd, 18th, 7th, 14th, and 8th ranked teams in that order, including three overtime or penalty shootout victories, capturing their first state title in program history.

In 2025, the girls' swimming & diving team won their first ever swimming & diving state championship, claiming the MIAA Division 1 State Championship.

=== Theatre Ink ===
Theatre Ink is Newton North's theater department. Students work as directors, stage managers, student producers, and designers, and in backstage roles, in addition to onstage roles. All sets, lights, and sound for productions are designed, built, and operated by students. Theatre Ink uses two performance spaces, the Performing Arts Center, which is a standard proscenium theatre and seats approximately 600, and the little theatre, a roughly 200-seat theatre-in-the-round.

In 2016, Theatre Ink entered a production for the first time into the Massachusetts Educational Theatre Guild's annual statewide theatrical competition. Theatre Ink entered its production of Oliver!, the musical based on the Charles Dickens novel Oliver Twist. The production won several awards, including Best Acting Ensemble, Best Dance Ensemble, Best Hair & Makeup Design & Execution, and Best Overall Production.

== Notable alumni ==
- Katharine Lee Bates (1878) – composer of "America the Beautiful"
- Robert S. Woodworth (1887) – prominent early psychologist
- Richard Chase Tolman (1899) – physical chemist, physicist, and scientific advisor to the U.S. government
- Percy Williams Bridgman (1900) – physicist and philosopher of science, 1946 Nobel laureate
- Edward Chase Tolman (1904) – psychologist and prominent theorist of behaviorism
- Warren Huston (1933)† — infielder in Major League Baseball
- George R. Collins (1935) – art historian
- Martin Karplus (1947) – chemist, winner of 2013 Nobel Prize in Chemistry
- Robert Morse (1949) – actor and singer, notably the 1961 original Broadway production and 1967 film adaptation of How to Succeed in Business Without Really Trying
- A. Joseph DeNucci (1955) – boxer and state auditor
- James Harris Simons (1956) – mathematician, billionaire, founder of Renaissance Technologies and the Simons Foundation
- H. James Shea Jr. (1957) – member of the Massachusetts House of Representatives, anti-Vietnam War activist
- Peter Guber (1960) – Hollywood film producer, part-owner of the LA Dodgers
- Pete Hamilton (1960) – NASCAR driver and 1970 Daytona 500 winner
- Michael Rosbash (1961) – biologist, 2017 Nobel Prize in Physiology or Medicine
- Stephen Greenblatt (1961) – Shakespeare scholar, academic, literary critic, pioneer of New Historicism
- Barbara Delinsky (1963) – writer of romance novels, including 19 New York Times bestsellers, also been published under the pen names Bonnie Drake and Billie Douglass
- Mark Sandman (1970) – musician, bassist and vocalist of Morphine
- Julie Taymor (1970) – theater director, The Lion King on Broadway; film director, notably of Across the Universe, Frida
- James Remar (1971) – actor, notably in Mortal Kombat Annihilation and Dexter
- Julie Palais (1974) – Antarctic researcher, glaciologist, climate change researcher
- Daniel Goldhagen (1977) – political scientist, former professor at Harvard University, author of Hitler's Willing Executioners
- Jim Corsi (1979)† – Major League Baseball pitcher, notably for the Oakland Athletics and the Boston Red Sox
- Laura Zigman (1980) – author of Animal Husbandry (adapted into the film Someone like You), Dating Big Bird, Her, Piece of Work
- Donnie Yen (1981) – Hong Kong actor, martial artist, and action director
- Elizabeth McCracken (1984) – author of Here's Your Hat What's Your Hurry, An Exact Replica of a Figment of My Imagination
- Louis C.K. (1985) – stand-up comedian, actor, producer, director, writer, and solo artist
- James Heywood (1985) – founder, ALS Therapy Development Foundation, co-founder of Patients Like Me
- Matt LeBlanc (1985) – actor, notably in Friends and Joey
- Seth Putnam (1985) – musician
- Josh Roseman (1985) – musician, composer and producer
- Michael Thomas (1985) – author of Man Gone Down
- Ronnie DeVoe (1986) – singer of R&B group New Edition
- Dimitri Diatchenko (1986) – actor, notably in Chernobyl Diaries; musician
- Sean Gullette (1986) – writer; actor in Happy Accidents and Requiem for a Dream
- Stephen Heywood (1987) – artist, builder, and subject of documentary So Much So Fast
- Florencia Lozano (1987), actress, One Life to Live
- Setti Warren (1988) – mayor of Newton and gubernatorial candidate
- Sarma Melngailis (1990) – chef, restaurateur, cookbook author: Pure Food and Wine, One Lucky Duck
- Liesl Tommy (1990) – theater and television director
- Seth Mnookin (1990) – contributing editor for Vanity Fair; author of Hard News
- Dana Adam Shapiro (1991) – co-director of Murderball, Director of Monogamy, Daughters of the Sexual Revolution, writer for Icon, Spin and New York Times magazines; author of The Every Boy
- Krister Johnson (1991) – actor, screenwriter, producer Medical Police, Murderville
- George T. Whitesides (1992) – Congressman for California's 27th congressional district, former CEO of Virgin Galactic, former chief of staff at NASA and former director of the National Space Society
- Andy MacDonald (1992) – professional skateboarder
- Ursula Liang (1992) – filmmaker, film and television producer
- Anne Dudek (1993) – actress, notably in Mad Men, House, The Book Group and Covert Affairs
- Priyanka Chopra (2000) – actress and producer
- Aoife O'Donovan (2002) – lead singer of the bluegrass band Crooked Still
- Dan "Big Cat" Katz (2003) – media personality for Barstool Sports
- Caitlin McGee (2006) – actress, notably in Bluff City Law, Modern Love, and Home Economics
- Jake Auchincloss (2006) – Congressman for the Massachusetts's 4th congressional district
- Sarah Lampert (2006) – showrunner, Ginny & Georgia
- Houry Gebeshian (2007) – artistic gymnast, former Iowa Hawkeyes team member, Armenia national team member
- Caroline Ellison (2012) – CEO of Alameda Research

† Inducted to the Newton Public Schools athletic hall of fame.

Note: alumni who graduated prior to 1974 are graduates of Newton High School.
