= Oliver & Company (soundtrack) =

Oliver & Company (Original Motion Picture Soundtrack)
- 1988 LP album cover

Soundtrack album by various artists
- Released: November 11, 1988
- Genres: Pop rock; blues rock; film score
- Length: 35:40
- Label: Walt Disney
- Producers: Stewart Levine; Phil Ramone; Tom Snow; Barry Manilow; J.A.C. Redford; Rubén Blades

Oliver & Company (Original Motion Picture Soundtrack) is the soundtrack to the 1988 Disney animated film Oliver & Company. It featured songs performed by Huey Lewis, Billy Joel, Ruth Pointer, Bette Midler, and Rubén Blades, as well as several scores composed by J. A. C. Redford.

After an attempt to create music for the film, each of the songs were written as an extension of a character. The soundtrack of Oliver & Company had multiple producers, and the songs were submitted in different styles and tempos. Jeffrey Katzenberg, who was chairman of Walt Disney Studios at the time, wanted to hire singer-songwriters to perform a song for the film. Billy Joel, who voiced Dodger, performed "Why Should I Worry?", and Bette Midler, who voiced Georgette, performed "Perfect Isn't Easy".

In comparison to the mixed critical reviews for the film, the soundtrack received acclaim from film critics. "Why Should I Worry?" was nominated for Best Original Song at the Golden Globe Awards.

== Background ==
In late 1984 or 1985, (Note: Although George Scribner has stated that the "Gong Show" happened in late 1984, several sources stated that it happened in 1985. It is unknown which time-frame is more accurate.) Michael Eisner and Jeffrey Katzenberg invited twenty film executives to pitch potential ideas for upcoming animated features, infamously called the "Gong Show". After Ron Clements had pitched The Little Mermaid (1989) and Treasure Planet (2002) to Eisner and Katzenberg, story artist Pete Young suggested, "Oliver Twist with dogs." The next day, Katzenberg, who had previously developed a live-action adaptation of the musical Oliver! at Paramount, approved the pitch for possible development, along with The Little Mermaid.

Early in production, there was an attempt to involve the music with the film. Director George Scribner wrote a "mental note" to not treat Oliver as a musical where the story would "abruptly stop" and "go into a song." Each song of the film was instead written as an extension of a character.

== Production ==
Katzenberg wanted to recruit a team of singer-songwriters to provide a song, which included Billy Joel, Barry Manilow, and Huey Lewis. Disney's former senior vice president for feature animation Peter Schneider felt Katzenberg's idea was a wrong way to approach a musical. According to Schneider, The Little Mermaid (1989), which was concurrently in development, was the right approach as the film needed "a unifying score and lyrics."

The soundtrack of Oliver & Company had multiple producers, with each song written with a different composer and producer, and a different arrangement date. Various songwriters submitted songs in a range of musical styles, but many of them did not fit with the film's premise. Billy Joel and Bette Midler, who voiced Dodger and Georgette respectively, performed their characters' songs, "Why Should I Worry?" and "Perfect Isn't Easy". The instrumental score tracks were composed by J. A. C. Redford, under the supervision of Carole Childs. Redford was hired to compose the score because of his previous collaboration with Disney music executive Chris Montan on the television series St. Elsewhere.

Dodger's song "Why Should I Worry?" was the first song written for the film. It was originally written as dialogue, but Scribner suggested the songwriters, "Forget where we're going to take this music, or the fact that it will be on an album. I don't care if it's released as a single or not. Write for the picture, write for character." Billy Joel was initially approached to write a song, but he decided he would "rather act in the movie." Joel agreed to sing the song despite the song not written by himself. It was the first song sung by Joel that he did not write.

A gospel and blues musical number was intended to open the film, but it was considered "too dark". At his suggestion of his friend David Geffen, Katzenberg brought in lyricist Howard Ashman, who co-wrote the song "Once Upon a Time in New York City" with Barry Manilow. Tina Turner was also intended to sing the opening number. "It's a Jungle Out There", written by Herbie Hancock, had Jenny playing with Oliver while playing a record with a "jungle rhythm", causing the setting to transition from Jenny's bedroom to an imagination taking place in a jungle. The song was meant to be used in the film, but it was discarded after the story was revised.

== Release ==
The soundtrack was first released on November 11, 1988, by Walt Disney Records. It was the first soundtrack album released on Walt Disney Records after its name change from Disneyland/Vista Records and Tapes. No songs were released as singles due to contractual agreements. However, "Why Should I Worry?" did receive radio airplay in Philadelphia. The soundtrack was re-released on February 29, 1996.

== Critical reception ==
The soundtrack received acclaim from film critics, particularly "Why Should I Worry?" and "Perfect Isn't Easy". Vincent Canby of The New York Times gave a positive review on the songs in his review, praising three songs, including "Why Should I Worry?" and "Perfect Isn't Easy". Beth Dunlop of The Miami Herald commented that "the music has a wonderful range from sweetness to syncopation." Bob Ross of The Tampa Tribune praised the soundtrack as "sappy". Dave Jewett of The Columbian commented that "Why Should I Worry?" "sounds like like it could be Joel's next hit." Lin Connery of Calgary Herald praised "Why Should I Worry?" and "Perfect Isn't Easy", the latter being stated that Midler "almost steals the show with her petulant performance." Joe Baltake of The Sacramento Bee stated that "the few songs [there] are delightfully urbane in a childlike way." Glenn Lovell of Knight-Ridder picked "Why Should I Worry?" and "Perfect Isn't Easy" as the most memorable songs in the film. Malcolm L. Johnson of Hartford Courant described "Once Upon a Time in New York City" and "Why Should I Worry?" as "boffo opening numbers" and "Perfect Isn't Easy" as a "show-stopper".

Jeff Strickler of Star Tribune commented that "Why Should I Worry?" is the "snappiest song", with the other songs that stood out being "Streets of Gold" and "Perfect Isn't Easy". Ben Yagoda of Philadelphia Daily News stated that a few of them are "so catchy that [he was] still humming them a week after seeing the film." Linda Cook of Quad-City Times had an enthusiastic response about the music, praising the songs as "great, particularly 'Why Should I Worry?'." Cook also commented: "Other offerings from Bette Midler, Huey Lewis, and Ruth Pointer could a provide a best-selling soundtrack." Bruce R. Miller of The Sioux City Journal said that the "Top 40 score", along with the choreography, "both work beautifully". Miller described "Once Upon a Time in New York City" as "Oscar-worthy" and stated that "by the time Billy Joel checks in with 'Why Should I Worry?', the film is rocking." Jack Daugherty of Record-Journal positively reviewed the soundtrack as "one of the most contagious musical scores of any of Disney movie in recent memory." During the film's theatrical re-release in 1996, Barry Walter of The San Francisco Examiner praised "Perfect Isn't Easy", saying that it "suggests the wit and panache of gay sensibility that Disney would embrace with great success in The Little Mermaid and Beauty and the Beast." In a less enthusiastic review, Gannett News Service gave the soundtrack one out of four stars, stating that "Why Should I Worry?" "deserve[d] to become a hit single, but none of the other [ten] cuts" were appealing without the "movie's visuals."

== Track listing ==
All of the scores listed were composed by J. A. C. Redford.

Side one
No.	Title	Writer(s)	Recording artist(s)	Length
1.	"Once Upon a Time in New York City" (^{[A]})	Barry Manilow; Howard Ashman; Jack Feldman	Huey Lewis	3:55
2.	"Why Should I Worry?" (^{[B]})	Dan Hartman; Billy Joel; Charlie Midnight	Billy Joel	3:32
3.	"Sykes" (Score)			2:17
4.	"Bedtime Story" (Score)			4:39
5.	"Streets of Gold" (^{[C]})	Dean Pitchford; Jack Feldman; Tom Snow	Ruth Pointer	3:36
Total length:				17:59

Side two
No.	Title	Writer(s)	Recording artist(s)	Length
1.	"Perfect Isn't Easy" (^{[D]})	Barry Manilow; Howard Ashman; Jack Feldman	Bette Midler	2:58
2.	"Good Company" (^{[E]})	Ron Rocha; Robert Minkoff; Jack Feldman	Myhanh Tran	2:30
3.	"The Rescue" (Score)			3:24
4.	"Pursuit Through the Subway" (Score)			3:45
5.	"Buscando Guayaba" (^{[F]})	Rubén Blades	Rubén Blades	3:48
6.	"End Title" (Score)			1:16
Total length:				17:41

=== Notes ===
- A Produced by Stewart Levine
- B Produced by Phil Ramone
- C Produced by Tom Snow
- D Produced by Barry Manilow
- E Produced by J. A. C. Redford
- F Produced by Rubén Blades

== Bibliography ==
=== Books ===
- Beck, Jerry (October 28, 2005). The Animated Movie Guide (1st ed.). Chicago, Illinois: A Cappella Books (Chicago Review Press). ISBN 1-55652-591-5.
- Koenig, David (1997). Mouse Under Glass: Secrets of Disney Animation & Theme Parks. Irvine, California: Bonaventure Press. ISBN 978-0-964-06051-7.
- Stewart, James (2005). DisneyWar. New York: Simon & Schuster. ISBN 0-684-80993-1.

=== News, journals, and magazines ===
- McCracken, Harry (1989). "Once Upon a Time in New York City: An Interview with George Scribner, Director of Oliver & Company". Animato!. No. 18. Cambridge, Massachusetts. pp. 20–23. ISSN 1042-539X.
- Fleming, Patrick C. (2016). "Dickens, Disney, Oliver, and Company: Adaptation in a Corporate Media Age". Children's Literature Association Quarterly. Vol. 41, no. 2. Baltimore, Maryland: Johns Hopkins University Press. p. 191. ISSN 0885-0429. ProQuest 1813155689.
