= Observatory Mansions =

Observatory Mansions may refer to:

- Observatory Mansions, a 2002 novel by Edward Carey
- Observatory Mansions, a 2014 album by Nicole Dollanganger
