= H. Melt =

American poet and editor

- Occupation: Poet; editor
- Genre: Poetry
- Notable works: There Are Trans People Here
- Notable awards: Judith A. Markowitz Award (2017)

H. Melt is a Chicago-based American poet and editor who is transgender and non-binary. They are the author of There Are Trans People Here (2021), which won the 2022 Heartland Booksellers Award for poetry. In 2017, Melt and Victor Yates received Lambda Literary's Judith A. Markowitz Award for Emerging LGBTQ Writers.

== Career ==
PBS NewsHour profiled Melt in 2015 around the publication of their debut collection, The Plural, The Blurring.

In 2017, Melt edited Subject to Change: Trans Poetry & Conversation, an anthology of poems and interviews by trans poets. Reviewing the book, Sung Yim wrote in Newcity that it was "an urgent declaration" of trans writers' ownership over their own stories, while Liz Baudler wrote in Windy City Times that the collection's scope and interviews made it "an excellent read".

In 2018, Haymarket Books published Melt's chapbook On My Way to Liberation. Reviewing it in Windy City Times, Kelsey Hoff wrote that the book's poems "juxtapose reality with possibility". The same year, Melt participated in the Chicago Archives + Artists Project, where they were paired with the Newberry Library's Chicago Protest Collection.

Melt's collection There Are Trans People Here was published in 2021. In a review for the Poetry Foundation, Diego Báez wrote that the book celebrates trans community and "gender euphoria" while drawing on queer archives, personal history, Jewish heritage, and Chicago queer community. The book later won the 2022 Heartland Booksellers Award for poetry.

Melt served as one of the Poetry judges for the 2025 National Book Awards.

== Works ==
- The Plural, The Blurring. Red Beard Press, 2015.
- Subject to Change: Trans Poetry & Conversation (editor). Sibling Rivalry Press, 2017.
- On My Way to Liberation. Haymarket Books, 2018.
- There Are Trans People Here. Haymarket Books, 2021.
