= T Kira Madden =

American writer (born 1988)

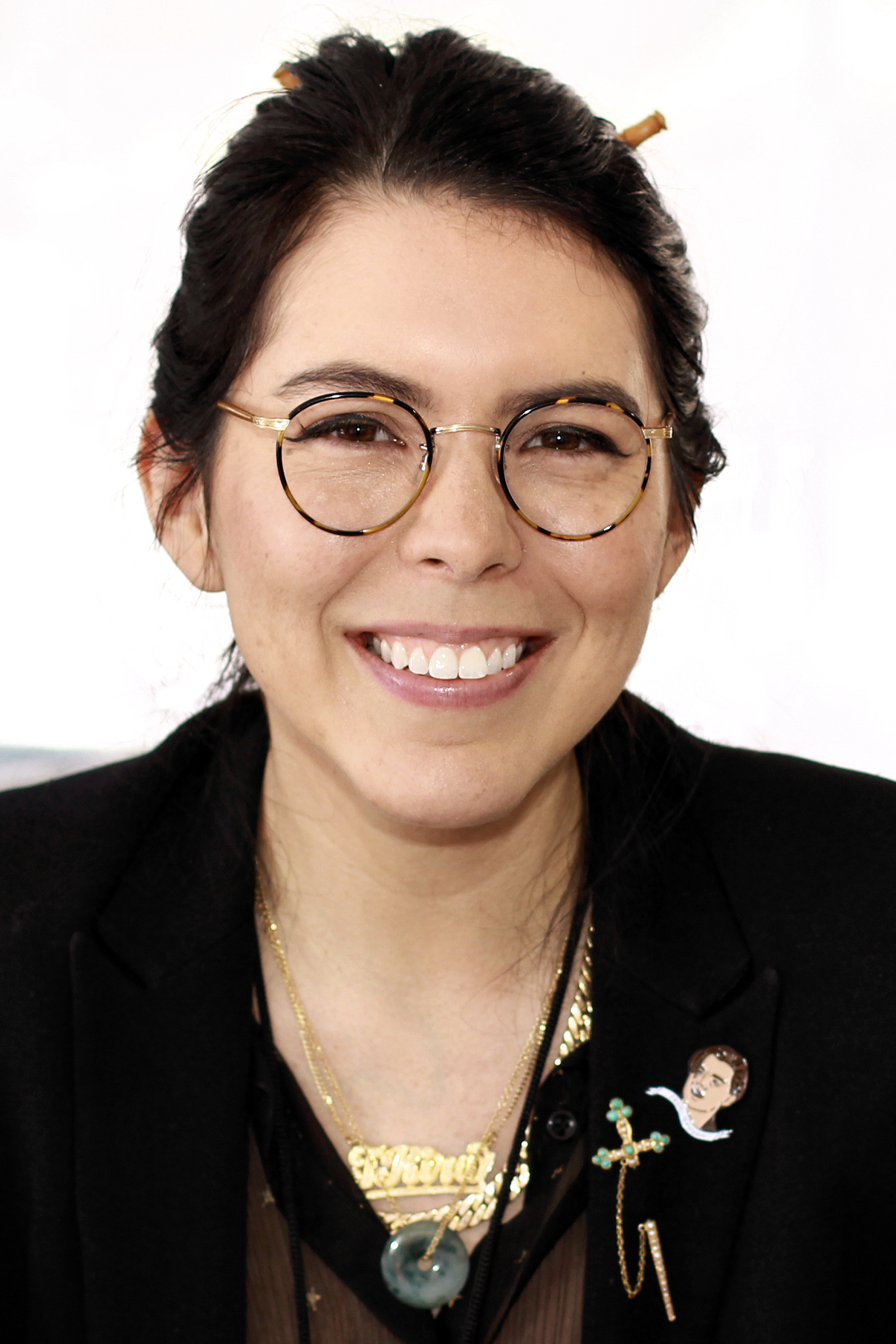
- Madden at the 2019 Texas Book Festival
- Born: July 20, 1988 (age 38); Miami, Florida
- Education: The New School (BBA); Sarah Lawrence College (MFA)
- Occupation: Author
- Spouse: Hannah Beresford
- Writing career
- Notable work: Whidbey: A Novel
- Notable awards: Judith A. Markowitz Award (2021)
- Website: tkiramadden.com

T Kira Māhealani Madden is a Kanaka 'Ōiwi writer. She is the author of the memoir Long Live the Tribe of Fatherless Girls (2019) and the novel Whidbey (2026). She is also the Founding Editor-in-Chief of No Tokens Journal. In 2021, she received Lambda Literary Foundation's Judith A. Markowitz Award.

== Background and education ==
T Kira Māhealani Madden grew up in Boca Raton, Florida. She is the niece of American fashion designer Steve Madden and the cousin of artist A.V. Phibes.

Madden has described herself "as a full-fucking-blown 50-footer lesbian". Of the queer material in her memoir, she has said, "I always knew I was gay, but I didn't understand the knowing, and that feels really true to me...As much as I wanted to front load the book with queer material, this feels truer to how I lived it. It was always present and by my side but it was operating in a different plane."

Madden's father was Jewish and her mother is Chinese and Hawaiian. Of her multiracial upbringing, she has said:

"My mother, as a Chinese Hawaiian woman, was raised in a Mormon household with Buddhist grandparents. And my father is of course Jewish from Long Island. They always let me learn about every different religion, every culture. I went to temple, I went to church, we did Chinese New Year's — we did everything. They told me: Wherever you find your place, that's your place. We're not gonna tell you where you belong. So that mix — which was confusing at the time — is something that was really part of my becoming [by] learning about all those different components of my identity."

Madden received a B.B.A. in design and literature from Parsons School of Design and Eugene Lang College at The New School. She also holds an M.F.A. in creative writing from Sarah Lawrence College. She facilitates writing workshops for homeless and formerly incarcerated individuals, served as the Distinguished Writer in Residence at University of Hawai'i at Mānoa, and currently teaches at Hamilton College as an assistant professor in Creative Writing and Indigenous literatures.

Madden is also a photographer and an amateur magician.

== Career ==
Madden has received fellowships from MacDowell, Hedgebrook, Tin House, DISQUIET, NYSCA/NYFA, and Yaddo.

=== No Tokens Journal ===
Madden is the founding editor-in-chief of No Tokens Journal, which describes itself as "a journal celebrating work that is felt in the spine." They are run entirely by women and non-binary individuals.

Madden has said that No Tokens was founded because "there was and is a need for more balance in publishing. There is a need for people to start paying attention, and I'm glad so many are. I admired what VIDA was doing; I admired many journals and publishers who said, 'We're here. Look.' It is unacceptable to ignore the numbers, and I wanted to be a part of that response."

On editing, she's said "Being an editor sharpens the eye and ear, yada yada, of course, but really, if we're talking artistic development, founding and editing a journal has taught me everything about generosity and community building. The longer I'm here, the more I believe those qualities matter as much as craft."

=== Long Live the Tribe of Fatherless Girls (2019) ===
At a writers' residency after the death of her father, Madden intended to work on a novel. Instead, she found herself writing nonfiction, which turned into her memoir.

Long Live the Tribe of Fatherless Girls was published in March 2019 from Bloomsbury. In Literary Hub, Madden describes it as "a coming-of-age memoir growing up in Boca Raton, Florida, in a very privileged Jewish community as a biracial, queer girl with a lot of family secrets: two addict parents and a famous family, as well." The book was a finalist for the 2019 John Leonard Prize. The memoir was also a finalist for the 2020 Lambda Literary Award for Lesbian Memoir or Biography.

Tessa Fontaine at The New York Times wrote, "This is a fearless debut that carries as much tenderness as pain. The author never shrinks from putting herself back into the world after every hurt, and we are lucky for it...it's all compulsively readable, not just because of those big themes, but because of the embodied, needle-fine moments that make the stories sing." Electric Literature said, "What makes Long Live the Tribe of Fatherless Girls so exceptional is the compassion Madden brings to the page." Ilana Masad at NPR said, "In baring the bad and ugly alongside the good, Madden has succeeded in creating a mirror of larger concerns, even as her own story is achingly specific and personal." Kirkus Reviews said, "Though the author's aching emotional rawness sometimes makes for difficult reading, this is a deeply courageous work that chronicles one artist's jagged—and surprisingly beautiful—path to wholeness. Affecting, fearless, and unsparingly honest."

When asked what she hopes others take away from the book, Madden said, "I hope people feel the power of being an outsider."

=== Whidbey: A Novel (2026) ===
Madden's debut novel, Whidbey, was published by Mariner Books in March 2026. The Chicago Review of Books listed it as one of "Our Most Anticipated Books of 2026." Upon release, it became an instant National Bestseller. The book received starred reviews from Kirkus Reviews, Publishers Weekly, and Booklist, and was recommended by The New York Times.

Kirkus Reviews wrote, "Moving among multiple perspectives that showcase a gift for creating in-depth, psychologically complex character portraits, Madden weaves a dark, propulsive narrative. As unrelenting as it is probing and compassionate, this extraordinary novel addresses themes—like childhood sexual assault and damaged love—that eloquently force readers out of their comfort zones. A searingly original novel that examines the impact of sexual trauma on the human psyche."

Emma Specter at Vogue wrote, "There is, to put it simply, no book quite like Whidbey, a literary thriller that braids together the perspectives of three protagonists—two survivors of childhood sexual abuse and the mother of their recently deceased abuser—with skill and astonishing empathy." Electric Literature noted, "In Madden’s hands, this noir revenge story is full of so much more than blood... Madden’s debut novel subverts notions of power and powerlessness, particularly regarding women’s bodies, while asking complex questions about honesty and culpability." It was named one of "The Best Books of 2026" by Vogue and Esquire.

== Bibliography ==
=== Novels ===
- Whidbey: A Novel. Mariner Books. 2026. ISBN 9780063289680.

=== Nonfiction ===
- Long Live the Tribe of Fatherless Girls. Bloomsbury Publishing. 2019. ISBN 9781635571851.
