= Julia Ioffe =

Russian-American journalist

- Юлия Иоффе
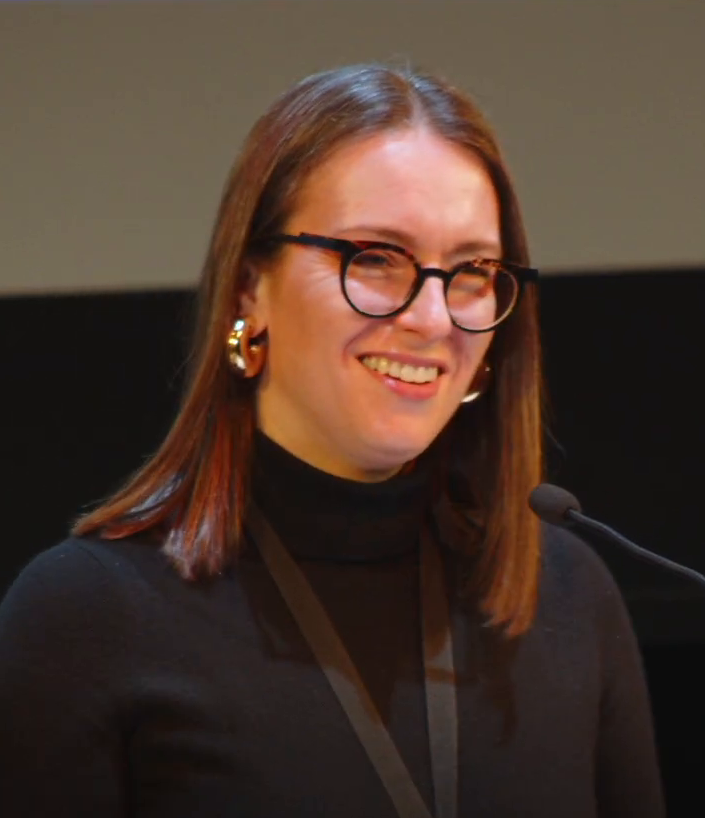
- Julia Ioffe in 2025
- Born: October 18, 1982; Moscow (Soviet Union)
- Education: Princeton University
- Occupations: Journalist, writer, television journalist
- Employer: Puck (2021–)

Julia Ioffe (English: /ˈjɒfi/; Russian: Юлия Иоффе, romanized: Yuliya Ioffe; born October 18, 1982) is a Soviet-born American journalist, author, and media entrepreneur. She is a founding partner and Washington correspondent at the media company Puck, where she co-authors the newsletter The Best & The Brightest, covering the intersection of national security, foreign policy, and domestic politics.

Before joining Puck, Ioffe wrote for The New Yorker, Foreign Policy, The New Republic, Politico, GQ, and The Atlantic. Her work has also appeared in The Washington Post, The New York Times, Forbes and Bloomberg Businessweek.

Born in Moscow, Ioffe immigrated to the United States in 1990 and later graduated from Princeton University. She is fluent in Russian and is widely regarded for her deep expertise in Russian politics. She is frequently cited as one of the most prominent and in-demand experts on Russia and Russia–U.S. relations. She has been often described by professional peers as having a "visceral" understanding of Russian politics, society, and culture.

Ioffe's reporting on Russian opposition leader Alexei Navalny brought her early recognition: her 2011 The New Yorker profile of Alexei and Yulia Navalny was a finalist for the Livingston Award for journalists under the age of 35. In 2024, the independent outlet Meduza recognized her as one of the two individuals "most responsible for educating the English-speaking world" about the Navalnys' work.

Her other notable work includes the 2017 Atlantic cover story "What Putin Really Wants," which challenged the narrative of Vladimir Putin as a "super mastermind," instead portraying him as a tactical gambler driven by emotional reactions and fear of regime collapse. In 2020, her investigative reporting for GQ on "Havana syndrome" was credited with helping pressure the CIA to provide medical care for affected officers.

In 2025, Ioffe published Motherland: A Feminist History of Modern Russia, from Revolution to Autocracy. The book blends family memoir with political history, centering the lives of Russian women rather than traditional male-dominated narratives. Motherland was a finalist for the National Book Award for Nonfiction and won the National Jewish Book Award. It was also named one of the "10 Best Books of 2025" by The Washington Post and Apple Books, and one of the "100 Notable Books of 2025" by The New York Times.

== Early life and education ==
Julia Ioffe was born in Moscow on October 18, 1982, to a Soviet Jewish family. During a period of late-Soviet shortages and rising social tension, her family decided to leave the country following rumours of imminent, violent antisemitic riots. On April 28, 1990, at the age of seven, she immigrated to the United States. The Ioffes settled in the suburbs of Columbia, Maryland.

Ioffe was raised in an environment shaped by professional achievement and deep roots in the Soviet intelligentsia. Her father, Michael Ioffe, is a computer programmer, and her mother, Olga, is a doctor fluent in three languages. Ioffe came from four generations of women doctors and scientists, whose lives would later help inspire her book Motherland. Her great-grandmothers were doctors and PhDs, while her grandmother Khinya was a chemical engineer who oversaw the laboratory responsible for the Kremlin's potable water supply.

Ioffe attended the Beth Tfiloh Dahan Community School, graduating in 2001. Although she initially planned to pursue a career in medicine, her interests later shifted toward history. Ioffe attended Princeton University, where she was strongly influenced by emeritus professor Stephen Kotkin after taking his "famously demanding: course "The Soviet Empire." Kotkin later described her as a "dynamo" who was "very passionate and full of energy ... directed toward understanding and making better the place where she came from." She graduated in 2005 with a degree in history and a minor in Russian studies. Her senior thesis, titled "Selling Utopia: Soviet Propaganda and the Spanish Civil War", was supervised by historian Jan T. Gross.

== Authorship ==
=== Motherland (2025) ===
==== Overview ====
In October 2025, Ioffe published Motherland: A Feminist History of Modern Russia, from Revolution to Autocracy, her first book. NPR described it as a "mongrel" blend of memoir, history, and reportage, while the Financial Times called it "part memoir, part journalistic exploration, part oral history." Ioffe stated that the book grew out of her frustration with being repeatedly asked to explain Vladimir Putin and a desire to "divorce Russia from Putin." She sought to demonstrate that the country was larger and more complex than "one person, let alone one man."

Reviews in The Washington Post, Reuters, and the Financial Times described the book as a reinterpretation of modern Russian and Soviet history through the lives of women rather than through the male rulers and political figures who usually dominate such narratives. The book centers the stories of "lesser-known but influential women" and it examines Russia's transition from an early 20th-century feminist "vanguard"—which granted voting and abortion rights decades before many Western nations—to its modern state as a conservative autocracy.

==== The generational narrative ====
A central thread of the book is the use of Ioffe's own family history, drawing on four generations of highly educated women, including doctors and scientists, whose achievements might appear exceptional to Western readers but were, in Ioffe's telling, often ordinary within the Soviet context. Her family history includes her grandmother Khinya, a chemical engineer who oversaw the laboratory supplying potable water to the Kremlin.

Through these lives, Ioffe explores what several reviewers described as the paradox of the Soviet experience: the state granted women major legal and social rights, including abortion rights, no-fault divorce, and expanded access to education and work, yet failed to provide the promised social infrastructure for childcare and domestic labor. This resulted in what Ioffe describes as an "exhausting, sexist grind" in the later Soviet period, where women were expected to maintain full-time careers while bearing the full burden of domestic duties.

==== Key historical figures and chapters ====
The Financial Times wrote that "Ioffe's feminist history is not one thing after another, it is one woman's story after another." The book juxtaposes stories of women who were "glorified and women mistreated, women arrested and women who survived" with the members of Ioffe's own family. Alongside her family history, Ioffe excavates the lives of several prominent and marginalized historical figures:

- Alexandra Kollontai: a daughter of privilege turned Marxist revolutionary, commissar of social welfare, and the world's first female cabinet minister, who oversaw policies guaranteeing women maternity leave, equality in marriage, and access to higher education.
- Inessa Armand and Nadezhda Krupskaya: the mistress and wife of Vladimir Lenin, respectively, both associated with efforts to mobilize women politically, including through the Zhenotdel ("Women's Section"), the women's arm of the Communist Party.
- Wives and daughters of Soviet leaders: from Lenin to Putin, including Svetlana Alliluyeva, the daughter of Joseph Stalin, whose life Ioffe follows through her eventual defection to the United States; Galina Brezhneva, the daughter of Leonid Brezhnev; and Lyudmila Putina, the former wife of Vladimir Putin.
- Lyudmila Pavlichenko: the World War II sniper credited with 309 confirmed kills.
- Modern figures: the book concludes with contemporary activists and public figures, including members of Pussy Riot, Yulia Navalnaya, the widow of opposition leader Alexei Navalny, and mothers fighting for their sons' return, from 1990s Chechnya to 2020s Ukraine.

A significant portion of the book is devoted to historical chapters often overlooked by male historians, including the gender resegregation of schools under Stalin and the history of sexual violence perpetrated by secret police chief Lavrentiy Beria. The Washington Post highlighted Ioffe's treatment of the Beria material as a recovery of a chapter often relegated to the margins of Russian history. The section includes the story of Valentina "Lyalya" Drozdova, whom Beria systematically raped and impregnated after forcing her into his mansion when she was 16 years old. The review also quotes historian Amy Knight as saying that, while "everyone knew he was doing it," the history of Beria's sexual violence was not so much suppressed as ignored by later historians.

==== Critical reception and honors ====
Motherland received widespread critical acclaim and was recognized with several major honors:

- Awards: The book was a finalist for the National Book Award for Nonfiction (2025) and won the National Jewish Book Award.
- Year-end lists: It was named one of the "10 Best Books of 2025" by The Washington Post and Apple Books, and was selected as one of the "100 Notable Books of 2025" by The New York Times.
- Critical response: The book received positive reviews in major outlets. The New York Times described the work as an "enthralling narrative that is both sweeping and intimate," while The Guardian called it "brilliantly executed." Reuters wrote that the book "excavates a largely overlooked narrative in which women are not just witnesses to Russia's upheavals, but central protagonists", and the Financial Times stated it made a "refreshing argument" that a different Russia was possible. The New Yorker editor David Remnick described the work as "profoundly interesting and soulful."

== Career in journalism ==
Julia Ioffe began her career in journalism as a fact-checker at The New Yorker in 2005. She later wrote for The New Yorker, The New Republic, Politico, The New York Times, Foreign Policy, The Atlantic, The Washington Post, Forbes, and GQ. From 2009 to 2012, she was based in Moscow, writing for The New Yorker and Foreign Policy. After returning to the United States in 2012, she became a senior editor at The New Republic, later wrote for Politico Magazine and GQ, and joined The Atlantic in 2017. Since 2021, she has been a founding partner and Washington correspondent at Puck.

=== Years in Russia (2009–2012) ===
In 2009, Ioffe received a Fulbright scholarship to live and work in Russia. Over the next three years, she was based in Moscow as a correspondent for The New Yorker and Foreign Policy, where she wrote the column "Kremlinology 2012."

From 2011 to 2012, Russia entered its most serious period of political unrest since the Soviet collapse, as mass protests over electoral fraud coincided with Vladimir Putin's return to the presidency. Reporting from inside Moscow, Ioffe covered the emerging opposition, including Pussy Riot, and wrote dispatches on Russian politics and society. Bloomberg later wrote that her reporting from Russia challenged simplified depictions of the country as monolithic or "all powerful."

==== Profile of Alexey Navalny ====
In March 2011, Julia Ioffe published the first major English-language profile of Alexei Navalny in The New Yorker, which is credited with bringing the anti-corruption activist to international prominence. At the time, Navalny was primarily known as an opposition blogger and crusader against corruption rather than a national political figure. Bloomberg later described the piece as a "breakthrough moment" for Ioffe's career, stating that Navalny was still relatively unknown to Western audiences when the article appeared. David Hoffman, a former Washington Post Moscow bureau chief, said the profile revealed a depth of reporting that surprised even seasoned Russia specialists: "When that piece appeared, I knew none of that. I thought, 'Wow, this is somebody who is really running deep in a place that I thought I was.'" Later that year the profile earned Ioffe a nomination for the Livingston Award.

Ioffe first met Navalny for lunch in late 2010, initially planning a brief blog post in Bloomberg Businessweek before recognizing his political potential. She later compared the experience to meeting a young Bill Clinton or Barack Obama, describing Navalny's charisma as "intoxicating" and saying that he possessed his own "gravitational pull." Although The New Yorker editor-in-chief David Remnick was initially unfamiliar with the activist, Ioffe successfully urged him to commission the profile, arguing that Navalny was truly extraordinary. Over the following decade, Ioffe reported extensively on Navalny's rise to political stardom and tracked his wife, Yulia Navalnaya, through numerous articles, including a 2021 profile for Vanity Fair. Consequently, Meduza recognized her alongside filmmaker Daniel Roher as one of the two individuals most responsible for educating the English-speaking world about Navalny's work.

==== Other works ====
Ioffe published a profile of billionaire and 2012 presidential candidate Mikhail Prokhorov. For Foreign Policy, she wrote an investigative dispatch that revealed the identities behind a popular Twitter account lampooning President Putin. Susan Glasser, then-editor of Foreign Policy, characterized Ioffe as a "unique talent" and one of the "smartest Russia hands in Washington."

==== The boy on the bicycle ====
During the May 6, 2012 protests in Moscow, on the eve of Vladimir Putin's inauguration, Ioffe captured an image that became a symbol of the protest movement. Standing directly behind a young boy on a bicycle with training wheels, she used her iPhone to photograph him facing what Yahoo News described as a "seemingly endless squadron of Russian riot police in helmets and fatigues." She shared the image with her 6,000 followers under the caption "Russia's Tiananmen image," drawing a parallel to the "Tank Man" photograph from the 1989 Beijing protests. The photo quickly went viral and was described as "iconic." Media outlets including The Times, ABC News, and HuffPost characterized it as a "David and Goliath moment" and a visual metaphor for a protest movement challenging the Russian political system.

=== The New Republic and The New York Times Magazine (2012–2015) ===
After returning to the United States in 2012, Ioffe joined The New Republic as a senior editor in Washington, D.C., where she wrote on Russia, Ukraine, and American politics. Her work during this period included reporting on Vladimir Putin, Russia's anti-gay legislation, the Kremlin's ban on American adoptions of Russian children, and the Ferguson protests. Her 2013 cover-story profile of Senator Rand Paul was a finalist for the Livingston Award. Ioffe's article "The Loneliness of Vladimir Putin" was also published as the cover story of the magazine's February 2014 issue.

During the 2014 Sochi Olympics, she also traveled to Ukraine, where she covered the aftermath of the Maidan uprising, Russia's annexation of Crimea, and the war in Donbas. Vox later recommended her reporting on Ukraine, writing that it was work readers "should read in its entirety," and Washington Monthly later said she showed "extraordinary physical bravery" in covering the 2014 Russian assault on Crimea.

In December 2014, Ioffe was among the staff members who resigned from The New Republic in protest over owner Chris Hughes's planned changes to the magazine. Her emails and comments were cited by Ryan Lizza in an article for The New Yorker about the changes at The New Republic.

In January 2015, Ioffe joined The New York Times Magazine as a contributor.

=== GQ and Politico (2016) ===
==== GQ profile of Melania Trump and the subsequent antisemitic abuse ====
In April 2016, Ioffe published a profile of Melania Trump titled "The Model American" in GQ magazine. The article drew attention for reporting that Melania Trump had a half-brother in Slovenia whom her father had not publicly acknowledged, a fact she later confirmed after initial denials. Coverage in The Washington Post subsequently listed this finding as one of the most notable revelations among the various profiles of the future First Lady published during the campaign. Following the publication, Melania Trump criticized the article in a Facebook post as an "unfair scrutiny" of her parents' privacy.

After the article appeared, Ioffe became the target of a sustained campaign of antisemitic harassment and death threats from self-identified supporters of Donald Trump. Major outlets, including The Financial Times, The Guardian, The New York Times, The Washington Post, and The New Yorker, reported that she received threatening phone calls—some playing recordings of Adolf Hitler's speeches—as well as Holocaust-themed images, anti-Jewish slurs, and "doxing" attacks that published her home address and telephone number. She also received images depicting her as a concentration camp prisoner and was targeted with fraudulent orders for services such as overnight caskets and homicide clean-ups.

The episode was extensively covered in Israeli and Jewish outlets, including Haaretz, The Times of Israel, The Jerusalem Post, The Forward, and Tablet. It was also widely discussed as part of a broader rise in visible online antisemitism during the 2016 election campaign. A study by the Anti-Defamation League (ADL) reported that more than 19,000 antisemitic tweets were directed at journalists during the 2016 election cycle, with 83 percent of those messages aimed at just 10 reporters; Ioffe was identified in coverage of the study as one of the journalists who bore the brunt of this abuse while working as a contributor to Politico. The New York Times and Politico linked her case to this broader pattern of online harassment, while Haaretz cited scholar Danielle Citron, who said that such antisemitism was "no longer hidden in the dark corners of the internet like it once was," but was increasingly visible "on very mainstream platforms like Facebook and Twitter." On April 29, 2016, Ioffe filed a report with the District of Columbia Police Department alleging a "threat to kidnap or injure a person."

In a subsequent interview with DuJour magazine, Melania Trump addressed the harassment, stating that while she did not agree with her fans' actions, Ioffe had "provoked them." This statement drew significant condemnation and was criticized as victim-blaming in mainstream, Israeli, and Jewish outlets.

==== Politico ====
In May 2016, Ioffe joined Politico as a contributing writer. For Politico magazine she has profiled President Donald Trump's advisors Stephen Miller and Carter Page, the latter an investor in Russia and the energy sector.

===== Departure from Politico =====
In December 2016, Ioffe tweeted: "Either Trump is fucking his daughter or he's shirking nepotism laws. Which is worse?" Several sources described it as a "crude joke". The post was retweeted by thousands of users within several hours.

The remark was posted in response to a report claiming that Ivanka Trump would be assigned an office in the East Wing of the White House, a space traditionally reserved for the First Lady.

Politico terminated Ioffe's contract "effective immediately". In a memorandum to employees, editor-in-chief John Harris and editor Carrie Budoff Brown wrote that "gratuitous opinion has no place, anywhere, at any time."

CNN later retracted the report. Ioffe deleted the tweet and issued several apologies, describing the tweet as a "tasteless" and "crass joke" that she "genuinely regret[ted]".

Ioffe reacted to Politico's decision to fire her by saying: "In Russia, the Kremlin rarely has to make the call to media organizations. The media bosses anticipate and do the censoring themselves." According to Haaretz, Politico's decision to fire Ioffe generated angry responses from other U.S. journalists, who said the news site was pandering to the incoming administration. The Forward pointed to a double standard, writing: "Donald Trump Tweets Without Consequences. His Critics Like Julia Ioffe Cannot." The Times of Israel and Jewish Telegraphic Agency linked Ioffe's reaction to the earlier antisemitic abuse she had faced during the presidential campaign.

At the time of the incident, Ioffe was already scheduled to leave Politico to join The Atlantic as a national security and foreign policy reporter in early 2017. The Atlantic issued a statement in support of Ioffe acknowledging her "mistake". It expressed confidence that she would adhere to its standards upon joining the magazine. New York magazine later wrote that, because Ioffe was already on her way out at Politico, the censure did not "really count as a firing, per se," and contrasted Politico's response with the more tolerant tone taken by her new employer.

=== The Atlantic (2017–2018) ===
On December 6, 2016, The Atlantic announced that it was hiring Ioffe to cover national security, foreign policy, and politics, with editor-in-chief Jeffrey Goldberg describing her as "an indefatigable reporter, a gifted analyst, and an elegant writer". Ioffe joined The Atlantic in early 2017.

In October 2017, Julia Ioffe and Franklin Foer reported in The Atlantic on a series of emails from 2016 showing that Paul Manafort attempted to leverage his leadership role in the Trump campaign to "curry favor" and "get whole" with Oleg Deripaska, a Russian oligarch close to Vladimir Putin. The correspondence, conducted through Manafort's associate Konstantin Kilimnik, detailed offers of "private briefings" on the campaign in an apparent effort to resolve a long-running financial dispute involving an estimated $19 million debt Manafort owed to Deripaska. Subsequent coverage by Business Insider, Axios, and MSNBC highlighted that these emails provided evidence of a potential quid pro quo and were characterized by former FBI officials as a significant "counterintelligence flag". The reporting also uncovered surreptitious communications using code names—such as referring to Deripaska as "the guy who gave you your biggest black caviar jar"—leading to a private meeting between Manafort and Kilimnik in New York on August 2, 2016, just weeks before Manafort's resignation from the campaign.

In November 2017, Ioffe reported in The Atlantic that Donald Trump Jr. had maintained a ten-month private correspondence with WikiLeaks via Twitter direct messages between September 2016 and July 2017. WikiLeaks—identified by U.S. intelligence as a proxy for the Russian government's dissemination of hacked information—solicited the campaign's cooperation on various requests, including promoting links to hacked Podesta emails, releasing Donald Trump's tax returns, and challenging the election results if he lost. Subsequent coverage by outlets including The Guardian, The New Yorker, NBC News, and CNN said that, while Trump Jr. mostly ignored the messages, he responded on three occasions, informed senior campaign officials such as Steve Bannon and Jared Kushner of the outreach, and at times appeared to act on the group's suggestions. These communications were later turned over to congressional investigators as part of the probe into Russian interference in the 2016 election.

In January 2018, The Atlantic published Ioffe's cover story, "What Putin Really Wants." In the article, she argued that the American perception of Vladimir Putin as a "manipulative genius" was often exaggerated and described him instead as "a gambler who won big." In the article and in subsequent interviews with NPR, PBS NewsHour, CNN, and NBC News, Ioffe characterized Putin's decision-making as often emotional, improvised, and "ad hoc" rather than strictly strategic, and argued that it was driven primarily by regime preservation, a "hunger to survive," and a desire to avoid the state collapse and personal humiliation he associated with 1991. She also portrayed the Russian state as highly personalized and internally weakened, argued that Russian interference in the 2016 U.S. election had been a "messy" and uncoordinated effort rather than a flawlessly executed master plan, and criticized what she described as "hysteria" in mainstream American coverage that overstated the Kremlin's power and competence.

=== GQ and Vanity Fair (2018–2021) ===
Julia Ioffe joined GQ in 2018 as a political correspondent focused on national security and foreign policy.

==== GQ investigation into "Havana syndrome" (2020) ====
In October 2020, GQ published Ioffe's investigative report "The Mystery of the Immaculate Concussion," which was later ranked as the magazine's third most popular story of the year. The article provided the first public account of Marc Polymeropoulos, a high-ranking CIA officer who suffered a career-ending brain injury during a 2017 visit to Moscow. Major outlets, including The Washington Post, The New York Times, NBC News, and Vox credited GQ—occasionally alongside The New York Times—with first reporting on the phenomenon later became known as "Havana syndrome."

The Washington Post stated that Ioffe's reporting recounted the "harrowing experience" of Polymeropoulos, who described the onset of his symptoms as feeling "like I was going to both throw up and pass out at the same time." Polymeropoulos said that he chose to disclose his story to Ioffe because she was "widely read in U.S. government circles," had a "reputation for fearless reporting," and, because of her expertise on Russia and "incredible contacts in the country," had a "near cult-like following" within the CIA's "Russia House." The report documented that the "Havana syndrome" phenomenon was not limited to Cuba, detailing similar unexplained health incidents involving U.S. personnel in Moscow, Poland, Georgia, Taiwan, and Australia. Sources told The Australian Financial Review that GQ's account of the attack on Australian soil was true.

Ioffe's reporting also included mobile-phone-location evidence used by the CIA to place Russian intelligence agents in close physical proximity to targeted officials; in two instances, operatives were identified in the same hotel at the onset of symptoms. Additionally, Ioffe documented a 2019 domestic incident in Arlington, Virginia, in which a White House staffer experienced a high-pitched ringing and intense headache after passing a parked van; her dog also appeared to suffer a seizure during the encounter. The investigation also detailed institutional friction, reporting that then-CIA Director Gina Haspel was skeptical of internal probes pointing to Russia, and that the Trump administration was reluctant to release a scientific report on the matter by Stanford microbiologist David Relman, a delay that frustrated the author.

The publication triggered a "media firestorm" that Le Monde described as having "sent a tremor through the powerful intelligence service." Expressing the frustration of affected officers, Polymeropoulos told GQ, "We wish we had a visible wound," and added, "I want the Agency to treat this as a combat injury." The report was later credited with helping pressure the CIA to provide medical care for Polymeropoulos and other victims at Walter Reed National Military Medical Center. Following the story, several former CIA directors reportedly contacted the agency's leadership to express frustration over the lack of support for injured officers. The reporting later coincided with a policy shift under the Biden administration, which formed a dedicated Havana syndrome task force and saw the unanimous passage of the HAVANA Act ("Helping American Victims Afflicted by Neurological Attacks") by both houses of Congress in 2021. The legislation established financial compensation for affected officials, and by 2023, NPR reported that some federal recompense for victims was on the way.

==== Vanity Fair profile of Yulia Navalnaya (2021) ====
In July 2021, Vanity Fair published Ioffe's profile of Yulia Navalnaya, titled "These Bastards Will Never See Our Tears," which characterized her as "Russia's real First Lady" and the "face of resistance" following the poisoning of her husband, Alexei Navalny. Drawing on a decade of observations and interviews with the family's associates, the article highlighted Navalnaya's transformation into a defiant political presence, most notably during the 2020 Omsk incident when she issued a public demand to Vladimir Putin for her husband's medical evacuation. Ioffe wrote that this "demand rather than a plea" established Navalnaya as a "defiant equal" to the Russian president. The profile was highly acclaimed, with Meduza naming it one of the best reports on Russia for 2021, and both The New York Times and the Atlantic Council citing it as a definitive source for understanding Navalnaya's political role and the couple's shared public image.

=== Puck (2021–present) ===
In 2021, Ioffe became a co-founder of the media company Puck. Serving as the outlet's chief Washington correspondent, she covers national security, foreign policy, and domestic politics. As a founding partner, she holds an ownership stake in the company and receives bonuses based on the number of subscriptions her work generates.

In 2021, Ioffe began writing the newsletter Tomorrow Will Be Worse, later renamed The Best and the Brightest, as "potential advertisers weren't keen on being associated with such a bummer title." The newsletter quickly gained popularity during the early months of Russia's full-scale invasion of Ukraine. It was described as "must read" by Bloomberg and "fantastic" by Forbes. Later commentary in the Financial Times described Ioffe as a "breakout star" of war coverage and said she had been "required reading" since the invasion because her knowledge of both Washington foreign policy and internal Kremlin politics had become "invaluable."

According to Bloomberg, following Russia's 2022 invasion of Ukraine, the newsletter's subscriber base quadrupled in less than nine months, significantly contributing to Puck's overall growth; at that point, monthly subscriptions were increasing by 65 percent each month. Her reporting during that period included what the Financial Times described as the "definitive profile" of Wagner Group leader Yevgeny Prigozhin, as well as a "very insightful" analysis of the strategic significance of Kherson.

While primarily recognized for her expertise on Russia, Ioffe has also commented on the Israel–Hamas war. She has analyzed the complexities of the conflict and the Biden administration's challenges in formulating a coherent Middle East policy. WNYC described her as drawing on her "Russian-Jewish-American identity" in discussing the war in Israel and Gaza.

== Media appearances and recognition of expertise on Russia ==
Princeton Alumni Weekly wrote that whenever Russia is in the news, Ioffe becomes the mainstream media's "go-to expert." Since 2013, she has appeared frequently as an analyst on national and cable networks, including CNN, MSNBC, and PBS. She has been a guest on news and political programs such as MSNBC's Morning Joe, All In with Chris Hayes, Hardball, The Rachel Maddow Show, and The 11th Hour; CNN's The Lead with Jake Tapper; and PBS NewsHour. She has also appeared in PBS Frontline documentaries, including Putin and the Presidents, Putin's Revenge, and Putin's Road to War.

Her commentary has also extended to late-night and comedy programs, including The Late Show with Stephen Colbert, Real Time with Bill Maher, The Daily Show, The Colbert Report, and The Opposition.

Ioffe's expertise has been recognized by prominent colleagues in the field. New York Times correspondent Peter Baker said that Ioffe "understands Russia in a visceral way" and "can explain us to them and them to us in a way no other reporter can." The New Yorker editor David Remnick likewise praised her "rich émigré background," "superb Russian and feel for Russianness," and her "fluidity" with a new generation of Russians, adding that he reads her work with "enormous interest." The Washington Post summarized Ioffe's long-running role as that of a journalist "who explains Russia to Americans."

== Bibliography ==
- Ioffe, Julia (2010). "The Moscow bombings don't matter". In Stein, Richard Joseph (ed.). Russia. New York: H. W. Wilson Company. ISBN 978-0-8242-1099-1.
- Ioffe, Julia (2025). Motherland: A Feminist History of Modern Russia, from Revolution to Autocracy. New York: HarperCollins. ISBN 978-0-00-846966-5.
  - Finalist for the 2025 National Book Award for Nonfiction
