= Xan Phillips =

American poet and visual artist

Xan Forest Phillips is an American poet and visual artist from rural Ohio.

== Education ==
In 2014, Phillips received a Bachelor of Arts from Oberlin College, where he majored in Creative Writing and minored in Africana Studies. While at Oberlin, he completed a two-year research fellowship in Black Poetics.

He received a Master of Fine Arts in Poetry from Virginia Tech in 2016.

== Writing ==
Phillips’ poetry has been featured in BOMB, Poets.org, Virginia Quarterly Review, The Offing, The Journal, Nashville Review, Ninth Letter, and Best Experimental Writing.

== Painting ==
Phillips' painting has appeared in The Kenyon Review, Poetry Project, and American Poets Magazine.

== Awards and distinctions ==
Phillips has received fellowships from Oberlin College, Cave Canem (2016–2017), The Conversation Literary Festival (2018), Callaloo, the Wisconsin Institute for Creative Writing (2019–2020), Brown University (2020–2021), and University of Pittsburgh's Center for African American Poetry and Poetics (2021–2023).

In 2020, he received Lambda Literary's Judith A. Markowitz Award for Exceptional New LGBTQ Writers.

In 2024, Phillips was announced as the 2024-2026 Anisfield-Wolf Fellow in Writing & Publishing at Cleveland State University.

Awards for Phillips' writing
Year	Work	Award / Honor	Result	Ref.
2021	HULL	Whiting Award for Poetry	Winner	
2016	HULL	Reasons for Smoking	The Seattle Review Chapbook Contest	Winner
2016	"For a Burial Free of Sharks"	Gigantic Sequins Contest for Poetry	Winner	

== Publications ==
- Reasons for Smoking (2018)
- Hull (2019)

=== Anthology contributions ===
- Bettering American Poetry Volume 2, edited by Amy King, Jayy Dodd, Camile Rankine, Muriel Leung, Sarah Clark, Michael Wasson, Joshua Jennifer Espinoza, and Héctor Ramírez (2017)
- Furious Flower: Seeding the Future of African American Poetry, edited by Joanne V. Gabbin and Lauren K. Alleyne (2019)
