= Judith A. Markowitz Award =

Literary award for emerging LGBT writers

The Judith A. Markowitz Award for Exceptional New LGBTQ Writers, formerly known as the Dr. Betty Berzon Emerging Writer Award and established in 2013, is an annual literary award presented by the Lambda Literary Foundation. The award is granted to "LGBTQ-identified writers whose work demonstrates their strong potential for promising careers." The writers must "have published at least one but no more than two books of fiction, nonfiction or poetry." Two annual winners each receive a $1,500 cash prize.

== Recipients ==
Year	Recipient	Ref.
2013	Carter Sickels	
2013	Sassafras Lowrey	
2014	Imogen Binnie	
2014	Charles Rice-González	
2015	Anne Balay	
2015	Daisy Hernandez	
2016	JP Howard	
2016	Bryan Borland	
2017	H. Melt	
2017	Victor Yates	
2018	Mecca Jamilah Sullivan	
2018	Jeanne Thornton	
2019	Robert Fieseler	
2019	Hannah Ensor	
2020	Xandria Phillips	
2020	Calvin Gimpelevich	
2021	T Kira Madden	
2021	Taylor Johnson	
2022	Ching-In Chen	
2022	Morgan Thomas	
2023	Naseem Jamnia	
2023	Maya Salameh	
2024	Federico Erebia	
2024	River 瑩瑩 Dandelion	

== See also ==
- Betty Berzon Emerging Writer Award
