= No Tokens Journal =

Literary magazine

No Tokens Journal is a literary magazine "celebrating work that is felt in the spine." It was established by T Kira Madden, who said it arose out of a need for more equity in publishing. The first issue appeared in Spring 2014. It publishes fiction, poetry, and nonfiction. No Tokens is run entirely by women, queer, trans, and non-binary individuals. Their staff reviews and votes on all submissions in all genres.

The name came from a conversation about three people "missing things – that was all. Subway tokens were one of those things. Print journals were another." In the past, the magazine has run a Young Poets Prize.
