= A. V. Phibes =

American illustrator

Alia Vulnavia Phibes is an American illustrator known for her slick, retro-inspired images, cartoons and pinups.

== Life ==
Phibes was born Alia Madden in Baltimore, Maryland. She also lived in New Mexico, Colorado, Brooklyn, New York, and Mexico. She is the niece of businessman Steve Madden and the cousin of writer T Kira Madden.

Phibes worked as a commercial illustrator before founding her design studio, EvilKid Productions in 2000. Under the EvilKid moniker, Phibes has done the webcomic "Evilkid Comix" and currently produces the webcomic Kitty and Robot.

In her commercial illustration career, she illustrated the books "make me a Popstar" by Michelle Tauber and "Shaking Her Assets" by Robin Epstein and Renee Kaplan. In her limited fine art career, she has done solo shows at Blue Ruin gallery in Pittsburgh and at Trinity Art Gallery in Philadelphia, Pennsylvania. She has also shown works in the Seattle Erotic Art Festival and the Dirty Show in Detroit. In 2005, she co-founded Dr. Sketchy's Anti-Art School, with Molly Crabapple.

Phibes also spent a few years as a sideshow performer, doing fire-eating, escapism, glass walking, a bed of nails act and human blockhead. She was a member of the Modern Gypsies Sideshow and later the Pyrate Sisters All-Girl Sideshow (with whom she still occasionally performs). She has also acted in plays with the informal theater group "The Lion Pinball Players."
