= Mecca Jamilah Sullivan =

American writer and professor

- Born: Harlem, New York
- Occupations: Writer, professor
- Awards: Judith A. Markowitz Award, Lambda Literary Foundation

Academic background
- Education: Smith College (BA); Temple University (MA); University of Pennsylvania (PhD)
- Thesis: Interstitial Voices: The Poetics of Difference in Afrodiasporic Women's Literature (2012)
- Doctoral advisor: Thadious Davis
- Website: meccajamilahsullivan.com

Mecca Jamilah Sullivan is an American writer and professor, best known for her debut novel Big Girl (2022). Her short story collection Blue Talk & Love received the 2018 Judith A. Markowitz Award for emerging LGBTQ writers from Lambda Literary. Sullivan is currently an associate professor of English at Georgetown University, where she teaches courses in African-American poetry, Black queer and feminist literature, and creative writing.

== Early life and education ==
Sullivan was born and raised in Harlem, New York.

She earned her BA in Afro-American Studies from Smith College in 2003, followed by a MA in English and Creative Writing from Temple University in 2006. Sullivan was awarded a PhD in English Literature from the University of Pennsylvania in 2012.

== Career ==
Sullivan published her first short story collection entitled Blue Talk & Love in 2015. The collection was praised for offering stories "about Black queer women written by a Black queer woman". In 2021, she published her first non-fiction book, The Poetics of Difference, which explores the writings of Black queer women.

In 2022, Sullivan released her debut novel, Big Girl. The novel tells a coming-of-age story set in Harlem in the 1990s, focusing on an eight-year obese Black girl as she grows up and navigates her family, weight, and sexuality. The New York Times said the book "triumphs as a love letter to the Black girls who are forced to enter womanhood too early – and to a version of Harlem that no longer exists". The book was praised for its examination of "what we do to Black girls and women: how even our best intentions squeeze them into small shapes." Sullivan cites the importance of coming-of-age stories, stating that she was "reading Toni Morrison's The Bluest Eye, reading Ntozake Shange's For Colored Girls and Sassafrass, Cypress & Indigo, reading Jamaica Kincaid's Lucy" when she was eleven years old.

== Publications ==
- Blue Talk & Love (2015)
- The Poetics of Difference: Queer Feminist Forms in the African Diaspora (2021)
- Big Girl (2022)

== Awards and honors ==
- In 2008, Sullivan won the Charles Johnson Fiction Award
- In 2011, Sullivan was awarded the Emerging Writer Fellowship by the Center for Fiction in New York City
- In 2012, Sullivan won the Alan Collins Scholarship from the Bread Loaf Writers' Conference
- In 2018, Sullivan won the Judith A. Markowitz Award for emerging LGBTQ writers from Lambda Literary
- In 2021, her work The Poetics of Difference: Queer Feminist Forms in the African Diaspora won the William Sanders Scarborough Prize from the Modern Language Association
- In 2023, Big Girl was selected as a finalist for the Gotham Book Prize, an annual award honoring the best new book about New York City
