= Hedgebrook =

Retreat for women-identified writers in the U.S.

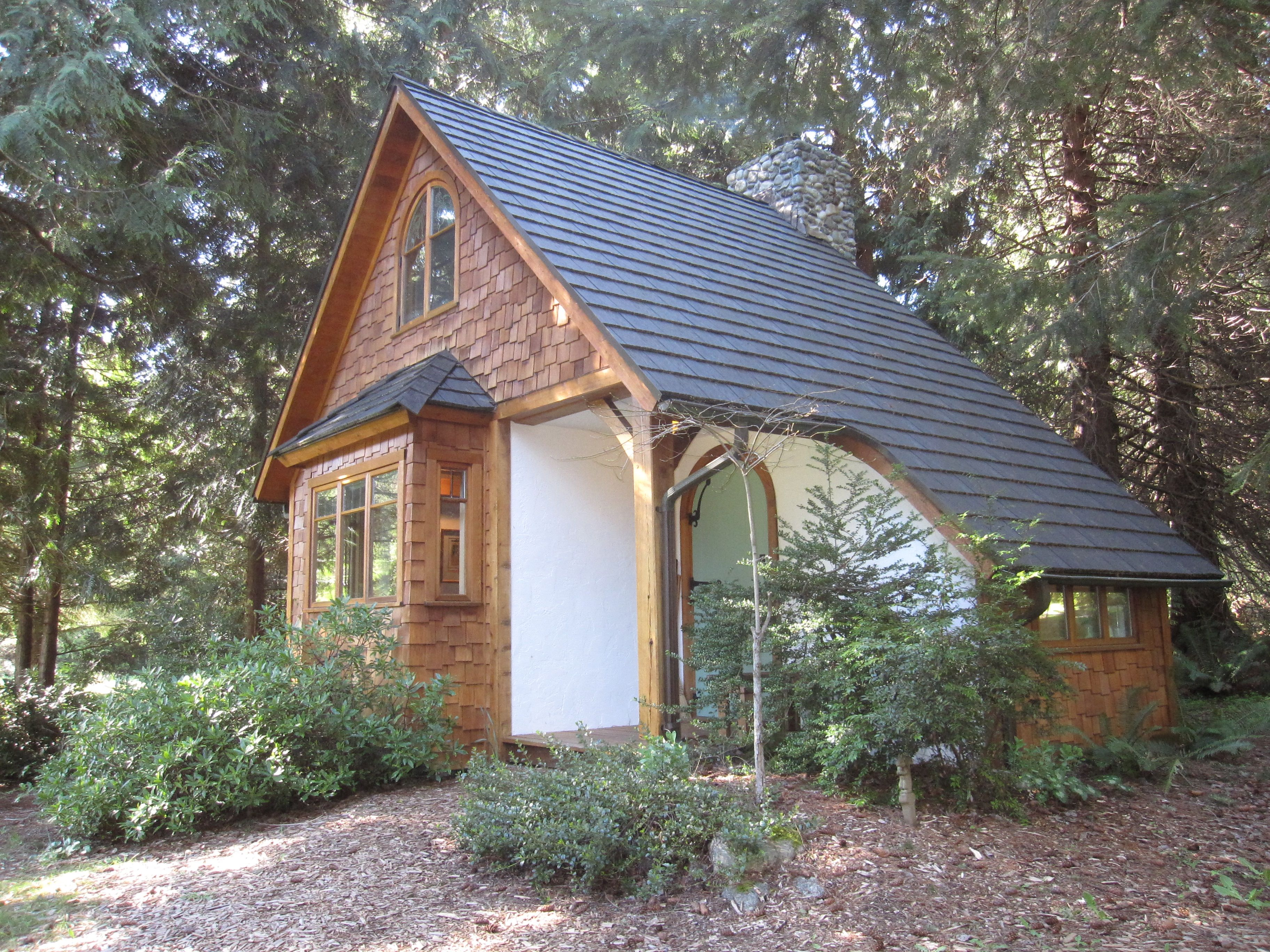
Artist's individual cottage at Hedgebrook

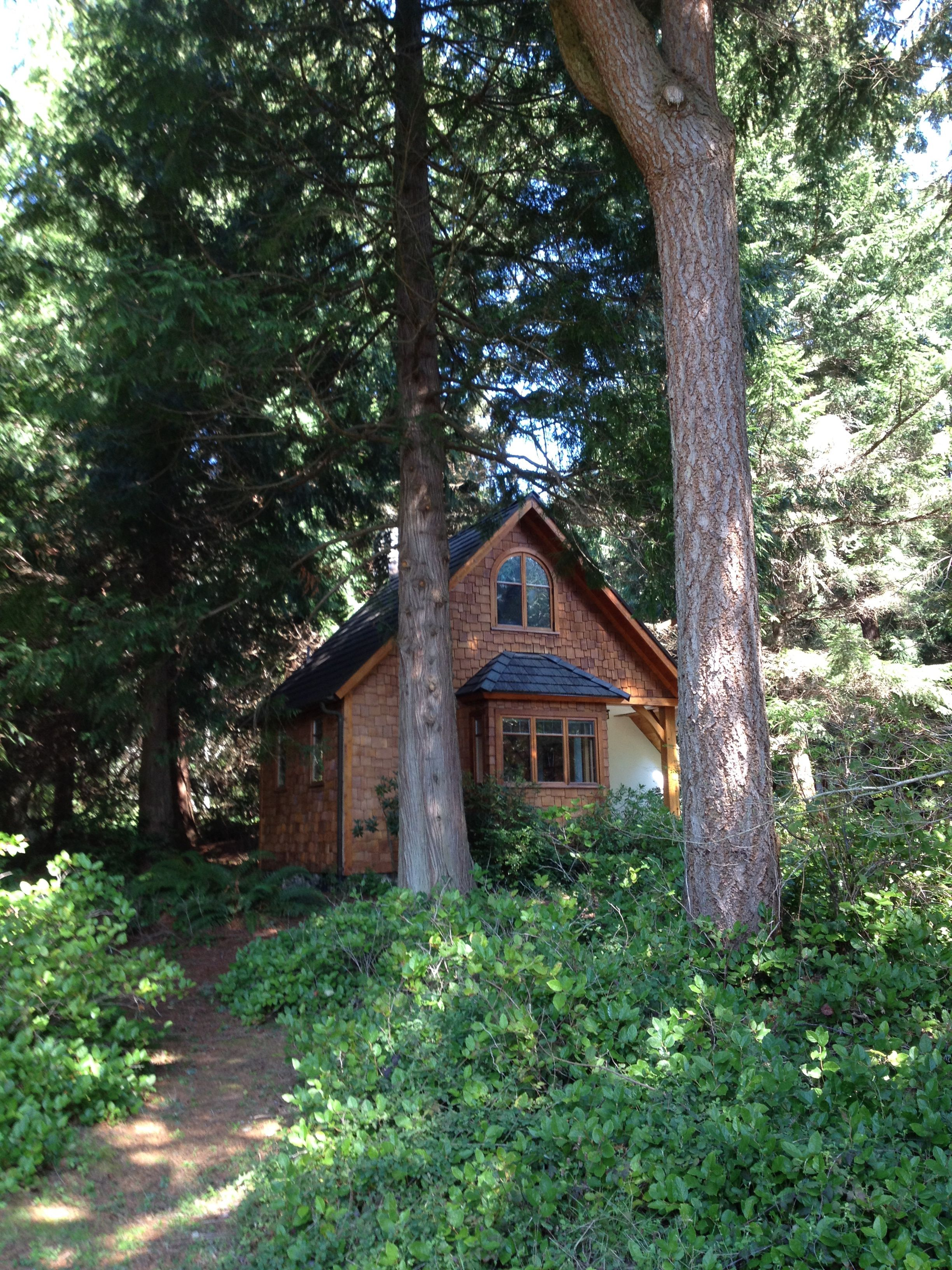
Artist's individual cottage at Hedgebrook

Hedgebrook is a literary nonprofit and rural retreat for women writers on Whidbey Island, Washington, founded in 1988. Hedgebrook's core writer-in-residence program accepts up to 80 writers each year, who spend two to three weeks in residence working on their diverse writing projects. Each writer stays in her own hand-crafted cottage. Room and board are provided at no cost to the writers-in-residence. The retreat is a working farm, offering organic produce for the writers, and communal dinners each night prepared by in-house chefs.

Hedgebrook's global community of alumnae, more than 2,000 writers from all over the world, include Pulitzer Prize winners Tessa Hulls, Lynn Nottage, Diane Seuss, and Annette Gordon Reed, celebrated author Gloria Steinem, poets Naomi Shihab Nye, Suheir Hammad, playwrights Dael Orlandersmith, Ellen McLaughlin, and Eve Ensler, novelists Noviolet Bulawayo, Bernardine Evaristo, Sarah Ladipo Manyika, Jacqueline Woodson, Ruth Ozeki, and Elizabeth George, memoirists Honor Moore, and Carolyn Forché, non-fiction writers Pramila Jayapal and Holly Morris, solo performer Sarah Jones, along with many other award winners.

Hedgebrook's programming offers writers the unique opportunity to learn from acclaimed alumnae authors such as T Kira Madden, Carmen Maria Machado, Karen Joy Fowler, Ijeoma Oluo, Claire Dederer, Robin Swicord and more. An annual writers conference, convenings, online classes, workshops, and public events in a variety of genres (fiction, memoir, playwriting, screenwriting, poetry) focus on many different aspects of the writer's craft and process.

The beloved Hedgebrook Women Playwrights Festival (HWPF) began in 1998 and celebrated the work of women writing for the theatre. The festival was a collaboration with partner theatres from around the country. In recognition of the fact that fewer than 20% of the plays produced each year on US stages are by women, Hedgebrook partnered with theatres who showed their commitment to women playwrights through commissions, development and production opportunities. Hedgebrook forged opportunities for women playwrights to deepen their relationships with theatres and was a part of the pipeline for plays by women to move from creation to development and production. Theater partners included: Denver Theatre Center, Oregon Shakespeare Festival, Seattle's ACT Theatre, Chicago's Goodman Theatre and Center Theatre Group, Los Angeles.

Learn more: www.hedgebrook.org
