= Harry McCracken =

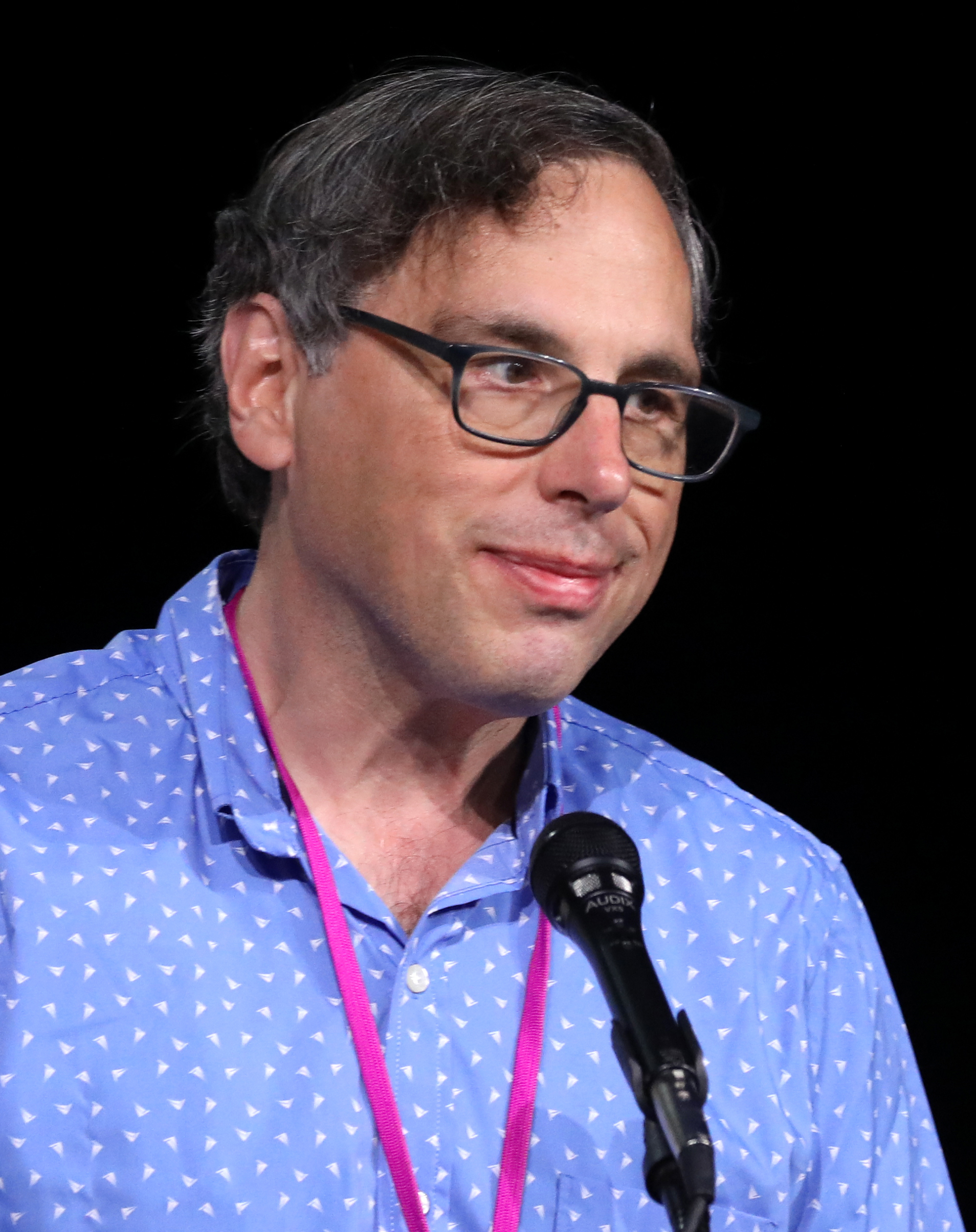
- McCracken in 2023
- Occupation: Magazine editor
- Relatives: Elizabeth McCracken (sister)

Harry McCracken is a global technology editor for Fast Company and the founder of Technologizer, a website about personal technology. He was an editor at large for Time, covering technology, from February 2012 to June 2014. McCracken is also a former contributing editor at CNET.

Until June 2, 2008, McCracken was the editor-in-chief of PC World for four years; he had previously held other editorial positions for ten.

== Biography ==
He was educated in the public schools of Newton, Massachusetts, the Cambridge School of Weston, and Boston University, where he earned a Bachelor of Arts degree in history.

McCracken is the son of the late Samuel McCracken, a professor at Boston University and a long-time assistant to BU president John Silber; and Natalie Jacobson McCracken, a retired editor in chief for development and alumni publications at BU.

== Controversy ==
On May 1, 2007, McCracken resigned abruptly under controversial circumstances. McCracken quit abruptly because the new CEO of PC World, Colin Crawford, tried to stop an unfavorable story about Apple Inc. and Steve Jobs. Crawford responded, calling media reports of McCracken's resignation "inaccurate." McCracken told colleagues that IDG, PC World's publisher, "was pressuring him to avoid stories that were critical of major advertisers." On May 9, 2007, Crawford was transferred to another department and McCracken returned to PC World.

== Other works ==
In addition to his computer magazine work, McCracken has also been active in animation fandom, as a central mailer for Apatoons, and editor of Animato! magazine. He was also co-moderator of the BIX Animation Forum, with the late Emru Townsend. He is also the webmaster of the Scrappyland website, devoted to the Charles Mintz cartoon character Scrappy. He has also contributed to Slate.

== Awards ==
McCracken has won a number of awards for his editorial work. He received the American Business Media (ABM) Timothy White Award for Editorial Integrity in 2008, recognizing his resignation on principle in 2007. That same year he also won Best Editorial Column recognition from ABM and was listed on Folio magazine's list of 40 media influencers.

== Personal life ==
McCracken married Marie Domingo on December 26, 2010. He is the brother of novelist and teacher Elizabeth McCracken.
