= An Exact Replica of a Figment of My Imagination =

2008 pregnancy and stillbirth memoir

An Exact Replica of a Figment of My Imagination: A Memoir
- Author: Elizabeth McCracken
- Language: en
- Publisher: Little, Brown and Co.
- Publication date: 2008
- Publication place: United States
- ISBN: 9780316027670
- OCLC: 191882070
- Dewey Decimal: 813/.54 B
- LC Class: 2008005032

An Exact Replica of a Figment of My Imagination is a 2008 memoir by the novelist Elizabeth McCracken of a full-term pregnancy that ended in a stillbirth. Maureen Corrigan of NPR's Fresh Air named it one of the best books of 2008, about a "nightmare that hasn't been quite categorized." Time's Lev Grossman wrote that reading Replica is a "mysteriously enlarging experience" and that it is "the funniest book about a dead baby that you will ever read."

== Background and reception ==
People magazine noted the rarity of records of such experiences: "In the annals of grief memoirs, stillbirth stories don't figure big. How much is there to say, after all, about a baby who never drew breath? McCracken, who was days from her due date when her doctor failed to find a heartbeat, knows how much." The New York Times reviewer, who had apparently experienced something similar, wrote of Replica, "the author also applies honesty, wisdom and even wit to a painful event." Kirkus Reviews noted that while McCracken wrote "Closure is bullshit," "her memoir shows her achieving a sort of peace, though never a mindless tranquility." Fourth Genre, a journal dedicated to "notable, innovative work in non-fiction," described the book in a column about how different writers have approached grief: "McCracken frankly illuminates what that situation really implies: the sad and gruesome facts concerning giving birth to a dead baby. You carry it for the full nine months, you feel it move inside you, so you and your mate know for sure its alive, and then you bear it, finally, because you have to, even though you've learned it has died." An excerpt was published in the August 2008 issue of Oprah magazine.

== Legal and scholarly significance ==
Analyses of how stillbirths should be treated legally have referenced this book. Legal scholar Carol Sanger wrote in 2012, "Putting anything into the balance against the exigencies of parental grief may suggest a cold indifference to suffering. That is not the case here. I proceed in my analysis ever mindful of the utter calamity of stillbirth for the parents of a stillborn baby. It is, as novelist Elizabeth McCracken states in her generous memoir of stillbirth, 'the worst thing in the world.'" The book has also been described as part of a genre of "narratives about pregnancy by those who have been pregnant. Such narratives can help us to partially overcome the obstacles that those who have not been pregnant face in grasping the knowledge gained through pregnancy."

== Influence ==
In 2018, Ninth Letter published Maggie Smith's "Poem Beginning with a Line from An Exact Replica of a Figment of My Imagination"
