= Newton-Beijing Jingshan School Exchange Program =

The Newton-Beijing Jingshan School Exchange Program is the oldest student exchange of public secondary school students between the United States and the People's Republic of China. The city of Newton, Massachusetts, hosts students and teachers from the Jingshan School in Beijing for four months each fall and sends students and teachers from Newton North High School and Newton South to Beijing each spring.

== History ==
Beginning in 1985, through 1989, groups of two to three teachers and four to five students spent a semester living, studying, and working in one another's school community in alternate years. Intensive language and cultural study preceded each visit. (The American students in Beijing at the beginning of the Tiananmen Square protests of 1989 were sent home early, though it is unlikely they would have still been in Beijing by June 4, 1989.) After a five-year hiatus, the exchange program was resurrected, and began the schedule it is currently on: Chinese students going to the U.S. for four months in the Fall, and American students going to China for four months in the Spring.

Each school pays the respective travel expenses, while host families provide room and board. Through multiple programs and grants, about 80 teachers and administrators have been able to visit the Jingshan School outside the exchange program as well. The Newton-Beijing Jingshan Program has been a model for exchange programs across the country. The program is currently managed by Program Specialist Star Lew.

=== 2014 controversy ===
A Newton North senior created controversy in 2014 when, during his time in China for the exchange, he wrote several notes in the schoolbook of a Chinese middle schooler. These notes said, "Democracy is for cool kids," "Don't believe the lies your school and government tell you," and "It's right to rebel." Chinese school administrators said they were deeply offended, and the Newton school superintendent said the student violated the code of conduct for the exchange program by writing the notes. The founders of the exchange program worried the entire program might be jeopardized by the incident.
