= Winsted Citizen =

Newspaper in Winsted, Connecticut

- "It's your paper. We work for you."
- Type: Monthly newspaper
- Format: Broadsheet
- Owner: American Business Media LLC
- Founder: Ralph Nader
- Publisher: Andy Thibault
- Editor: Douglas P. Clement
- Founded: February 2023
- Language: English
- Headquarters: 7 Elm Street, Winsted, Connecticut 06098, United States
- Website: winstedcitizen.org

The Winsted Citizen is a broadsheet newspaper published monthly in Winsted, Connecticut, United States. It was founded with financial assistance from politician and Winsted resident Ralph Nader. The paper printed its first issue in February 2023. The Winsted Citizen was originally overseen by the nonprofit Connecticut News Consortium until it was sold in November 2023 to American Business Media LLC. However, no new issues have been published since it was purchased, and its website has shut down.

== History ==
The plan for the creation of the Winsted Citizen was officially unveiled on January 3, 2023, during a Rotary Club meeting at the Green Woods Country Club. Journalist Andy Thibault served as the paper's editor and publisher while Ralph Nader, a native of Winsted who delivered newspapers as a boy, agreed to provide financial support for the first edition, which amounted to $15,000. Of that money $5,000 was to pay Thibault with the rest going toward the paper's production. Thibault said future funding would come from selling advertisements and paid subscriptions from readers.

The first issue of the Winsted Citizen was printed on February 3, 2023, with 1,000 copies distributed among local libraries and mailed to area residents. The initial plan was to print a single issue as a proof of concept and then publish additional issues weekly if financial support from the community materialized. Nader said he wanted the publication to be print-focused and to not publish content online. He recommended waiting up to two months to gauge interest before committing to a second edition, but Thibault did not want to delay publishing more issues, saying:

I told him and his lawyer we might as well disembowel ourselves. Commit hara-kiri. We'd be a joke. We needed a second act.

— Andy Thibault, The Trumbull Times

Following the first issue, Thibault said the new plan was to print additional issues monthly for the remainder of the year and then publish papers weekly starting in 2024. A subscription for the rest of 2023 was $25, and would increase to $95 annually the following year. A month after publishing the first paper, Thibault said Nader failed to provide funding as initially promised for the paper's second edition. According to Thibault, Nader agreed to cover 75% of the cost, with the newspaper covering the rest. However, the money had not been delivered by the time of the second edition's printing. Instead, at that time Nader offered to give a $8,000 loan, which Thibault said the paper would not accept.

In March 2023, the Winsted Citizen had about 150 subscribers and cost about $30,000 for each paper published monthly. Thibault stated that changes were required to ensure the continual operation of the paper. Thibault planned to cease the publication's print-only stance Nader advocated for and also publish it on a paywalled website.

On November 20, 2023, the Winsted Citizen's oversight board voted to close the newspaper after publishing nine issues. In a memo, Thibault wrote the paper could not overcome an "untenable deficit" and lost money every month published. Two days later it was announced the paper had been sold to American Business Media LLC and would continue publishing. As a result of the sale, the paper did not lay off any employees and Thibault stayed on as a contributing editor. Since the purchase, the newspaper's website has shut down and no new issues have been published.

== Content ==
The Winsted Citizen publishes content focused on Winsted and the nearby Farmington Valley communities Hartland, Riverton, Colebrook, Norfolk and New Hartford. Topics covered include local businesses, nonprofits, restaurants, sports, government and other community news topics like wedding announcements. The first issue included contributions from 17 reporters and editorial cartoonist Bob Englehart.
