= Edward Carey (novelist) =

English playwright and novelist

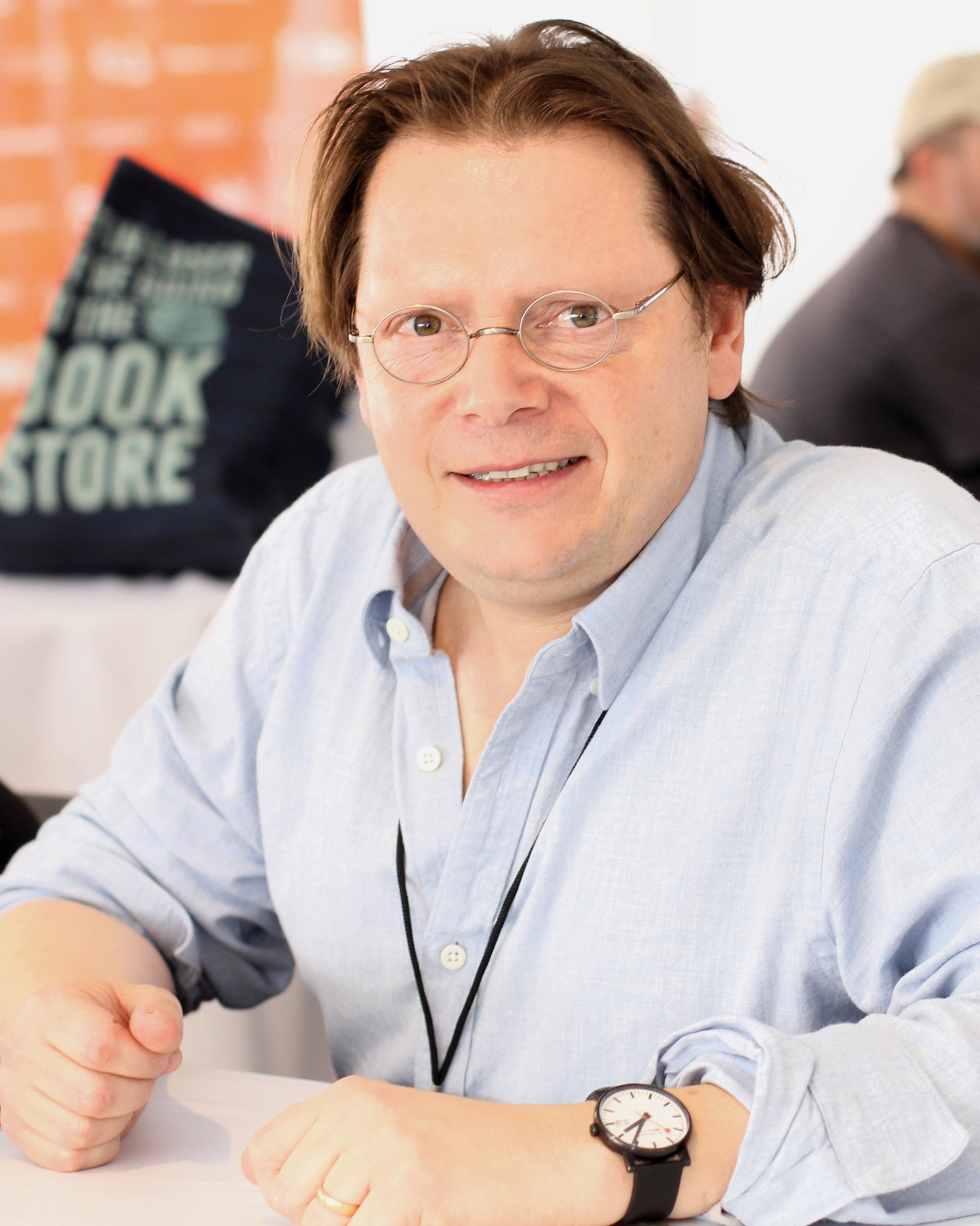
- Carey at the 2018 Texas Book Festival.
- Born: April 1970 (age 56); North Walsham, Norfolk, England, United Kingdom
- Occupations: Playwright, novelist
- Writing career
- Genres: Theatre, fiction

Edward Carey (born April 1970, in North Walsham, Norfolk, England) is an English playwright and novelist. He has written several adaptations for the stage, including Patrick Süskind's The Pigeon and Robert Coover's Pinocchio in Venice. His own plays include Sulking Thomas and Captain of the Birds. He collaborated with Eddin Khoo on the wayang kulit translation of Macbeth called Macbeth in the Shadows.

== Biography ==
Carey attended the Nautical College, Pangbourne, as did his father and grandfather. He did not enlist in the Royal Navy, however. Instead, he participated in the National Youth Theatre and attended the University of Hull, earning a degree in drama in 1991.

As a young Man, Carey worked in Madame Tussauds wax museum (London), which would figure into his historical novel, Little.

Carey attended the University of Iowa International Writing Program and taught at the Iowa Writers' Workshop.

He has lived in many European locations, but, in 2006, he took up permanent residence in the United States, settling in Austin where he teaches at the University of Texas. He is married to the writer Elizabeth McCracken.

== Works ==
- 2000: Observatory Mansions. ISBN 978-0-679-31130-0.
- 2003: Alva & Irva: The Twins Who Saved a City. Picador. ISBN 978-0-330-39605-9.
- 2014: Heap House. (The Iremonger Trilogy 1). ISBN 978-1-46830-953-9.
- 2014: Foulsham. (The Iremonger Trilogy 2). ISBN 978-1-47140-160-2.
- 2015: Lungdon. (The Iremonger Trilogy 3). ISBN 978-1-46830-955-3.
- 2018: Little. ISBN 978-0-52553-432-7.
- 2020: The Swallowed Man. ISBN 978-1-91354-703-5.
- 2023: Edith Holler. Riverhead. ISBN 978-0-59318-890-3.

== Awards ==
- Fellow, Guggenheim Foundation (2019)
