= Sergio Gutiérrez Negrón =

Puerto Rico author

- Born: Sergio Gutiérrez Negrón; September 14, 1986 (age 40); Caguas, Puerto Rico
- Occupations: Writer, Novelist

Sergio Gutiérrez Negrón is an author born in Puerto Rico in 1986. He has written three novels, Palacio, Dicen que los dormidos, and Los días hábiles. In 2017 he was named one of Bogota Hay Festival's 39 authors under 40.

== Biography ==
Sergio Gutiérrez Negrón was born in Caguas, Puerto Rico, in 1986. He studied in the Universidad de Puerto Rico, Río Piedras. He later moved to Atlanta and pursued a Ph.D. at Emory University. He is currently Irvin E. Houck Associate Professor of Hispanic Studies at Oberlin College.

Despite living in the United States, Gutiérrez Negrón continues to publish in Puerto Rico, where his novels and monthly column circulate.

== Bibliography ==
Gutiérrez Negrón has published three novels and a book of short stories.

- Los días hábiles (2020), novel.
- Preciosos perdedores (2019), short stories
- Dicen que los dormidos (2013/2014/2017), his second novel, won the National Novel Award from the Instituto de Cultura Puertorriqueña.
- Palacio (2011), his first novel, received an honorable mention from the Puerto Rico-PEN Club 2011 Best Novel Category.

== Awards and accolades ==
In 2017, Gutiérrez Negrón was selected as one of Bogota Hay Festival's 39 authors under 40.
In 2015, he was selected as part of Feria Internacional del Libro de Guadalajara's Latinoamérica Viva, a selection of promising or established contemporary authors from the continent. That same year, he received the Premio Nuevas Voces from the Festival de la Palabra, an accolade given to promising Puerto Rican authors.
