= Elizabeth McCracken =

American author (born 1966)

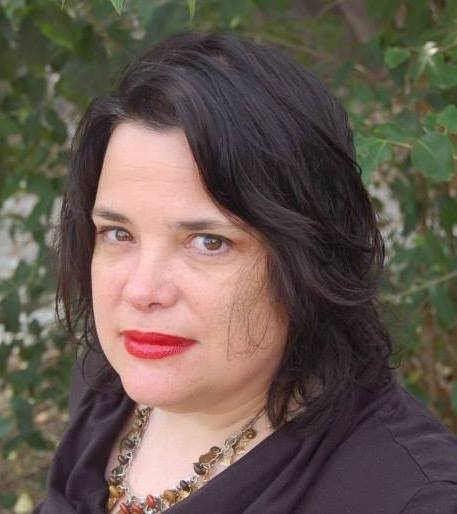
- Elizabeth McCracken
- Born: September 16, 1966 (age 60); Boston, Massachusetts, U.S.
- Education: Newton North High School; Boston University (BA, MA); Iowa Writers' Workshop (MFA); Drexel University (MS)
- Occupation: Author
- Relatives: Harry McCracken (brother)
- Writing career
- Genre: Fiction

Elizabeth McCracken (born September 16, 1966) is an American author. She is a recipient of the PEN/Malamud Award for Excellence in the Short Story, PEN New England Award and the Story Prize.

== Life ==
McCracken, a graduate of the Iowa Writers' Workshop, was born in Boston, Massachusetts, graduated from Newton North High School in Newton, Massachusetts, earned a B.A. and M.A. in English from Boston University, an M.F.A. from the University of Iowa, and an M.S. in Library Science from Drexel University. In 2008 and 2009, McCracken lived in Cambridge, Massachusetts, where she was a fellow at the Harvard Radcliffe Institute.

McCracken is the daughter of the late Samuel McCracken, a professor at Boston University and an assistant to long-time BU president John Silber; and Natalie Jacobson McCracken, a retired editor-in-chief for development and alumni publications at BU.

She is married to the novelist Edward Carey. They have two children; an earlier child died before birth, an experience that formed the basis of McCracken's memoir An Exact Replica of a Figment of My Imagination.

== Career ==
McCracken holds the James Michener Chair of Fiction of the Michener Center for Writers at the University of Texas at Austin. She and her husband were previously on the faculty of the Iowa Writers' Workshop. She is the sister of former PC World magazine editor-in-chief and Technologizer.com founder Harry McCracken.

== Writing ==
In 2014, McCracken published her first collection of stories in 20 years: Thunderstruck & Other Stories. Among the nine stories is one about a documentary filmmaker who has to face a famous subject he manipulated and betrayed; one about a young scholar who is mourning his wife; and one about a grocery store manager who obsesses over a woman's disappearance.

Her short story "Hungry" was long-listed for the 2015 Sunday Times Short Story Award, the largest prize in the world for a single short story. On March 4, 2015, McCracken was named the winner of The Story Prize for Thunderstruck & Other Stories and received the top prize of $20,000.

Her short story "The Souvenir Museum", originally published in Harper's Magazine in January 2021, was one of the 20 short stories selected (by Andrew Sean Greer) for inclusion in The Best American Short Stories 2022.

== Awards and honors ==
- 1996 National Book Award finalist, The Giant's House
- 2002 L. L. Winship/PEN New England Award, Niagara Falls All Over Again.
- 2014 National Book Award longlist, Thunderstruck & Other Stories
- 2015 The Story Prize for Thunderstruck & Other Stories
- 2015 Sunday Times Short Story Award shortlist for "Hungry"
- 2021 Sunday Times Short Story Award shortlist for The Irish Wedding
- 2026 PEN/Malamud Award

== Works ==
=== Fiction ===
- Here's Your Hat What's Your Hurry (1993, Random House) – The American Library Association included this anthology on its "Notable Books for 1994" list.
- The Giant's House (1996, Vintage/Avon) – Granta Books included the excerpt "The Giant of Cape Cod" from The Giant's House in its collection Granta 54: Best of Young American Novelists.
- Niagara Falls All Over Again (2001)
- Thunderstruck (2014)
- Bowlaway (2018)
- The Souvenir Museum (2021)
- The Hero of This Book (2022)

=== Nonfiction ===
- An Exact Replica of a Figment of My Imagination (2008)
- A Long Game: Notes on Writing Fiction (2025)
