= The Every Boy =

2005 novel by Dana Adam Shapiro

- First edition cover
- Author: Dana Adam Shapiro
- Publisher: Houghton Mifflin
- Publication date: July 13, 2005
- Pages: 224
- ISBN: 0-618-47800-0

The Every Boy is the debut novel of American author and filmmaker Dana Adam Shapiro.

== Plot introduction ==
In this debut novel, a fifteen-year-old boy dies mysteriously, leaving behind a ledger filled with his darkly comic confessions.

== Film, TV or theatrical adaptations ==
With Plan B Entertainment, Shapiro is set to write and direct a movie based on The Every Boy.
