= The Giant's House =

1996 novel of Elizabeth McCracken

- Author: Elizabeth McCracken
- Language: English
- Publication date: 1996

The Giant's House is the debut novel of Elizabeth McCracken, first published in 1996. The novel was short-listed for the 1996 National Book Award for Fiction. The novel explores how Peggy Cort, a librarian and "old maid", falls in love with one of her patrons, the world's tallest Man, James Sweatt.

The novel principally reflects on Peggy's exploration of humanity, despite the love story at the center. The Literature, Arts and Medicine Database described the novel as also successful reflecting on the dehumanizing treatment of "freakish" medical conditions.

== Reception ==
In general, reception of the novel was mixed. The New York Times gave mixed reviews to the " fractured fairy tale" of the novel, praising the prose where McCraken "unpacks her metaphors with the intensity of a poet", but describing the plot as "melodramatic". The Los Angeles Times, highlighting similar issues, was a bit more positive, writing "True, the story itself is a little short on story. But the premise is so engaging and the narrator so likable one can forgive a kind of slackness in the book's body."

The Guardian wrote that "Sentence for sentence, this book is easily as good as anything by Anne Tyler or Ann Patchett." Kirkus Reviews describes the novel as "A promising idea, ultimately disappointing in execution: McCracken's first novel lacks the one aspect vital to its success- -concern for the lovers."
