= Thunderstruck (short story collection) =

First edition (publ. The Dial Press)

Thunderstruck (2014) is a short story collection by American author Elizabeth McCracken. It won the Story Prize in 2014. The collection was also on the long list for the National Book Award.

Sylvia Brownrigg described it as a "restorative, unforgettable collection" in The New York Times.
