= American Business Media =

US business association

American Business Media (AmBiz) is a provider of information and connections in the mortgage industry, in the retail bank community, in the financial industry, and in politics. The company is based in Simsbury, Connecticut and its CEO is Vince Valvo. In January 2023, it was announced that Steven Winokur would be the company's Chief Marketing Officer.

AmBiz has approximately 300 member companies, and participates in an estimated 1,000 trade shows. In an article published by National Mortgage Professional in January 2023, editor David Krechevsky reported that AmBiz was growing dramatically, that its staff doubled in 2022, and the company was producing 30 mortgage and banking conferences in the United States hosting 20,000 in-person attendees annually.

== Television Newscast and Educational Webinars ==
National Mortgage Professional magazine also reports that AmBiz owns Mortgage News Network, which is a daily televised newscast about the industry, and that its network also produces numerous podcasts. AmBiz hosts educational webinars.

== Publications ==
American Business Media produces about 5,000 print and online publications, which include National Mortgage Professional, Mortgage Banker, Mortgage Women, Florida Originator, California Broker, and Lonestar LO in Texas.

AmBiz sponsors the annual Jesse H. Neal Awards, which rewards editorial skills in business-to-business publications.

In November 2023, American Business Media acquired monthly newspaper Winsted Citizen, saving it from closure.

== History ==
American Business Media (AmBiz) was founded in 1906.
