= Caridad Moro-Gronlier =

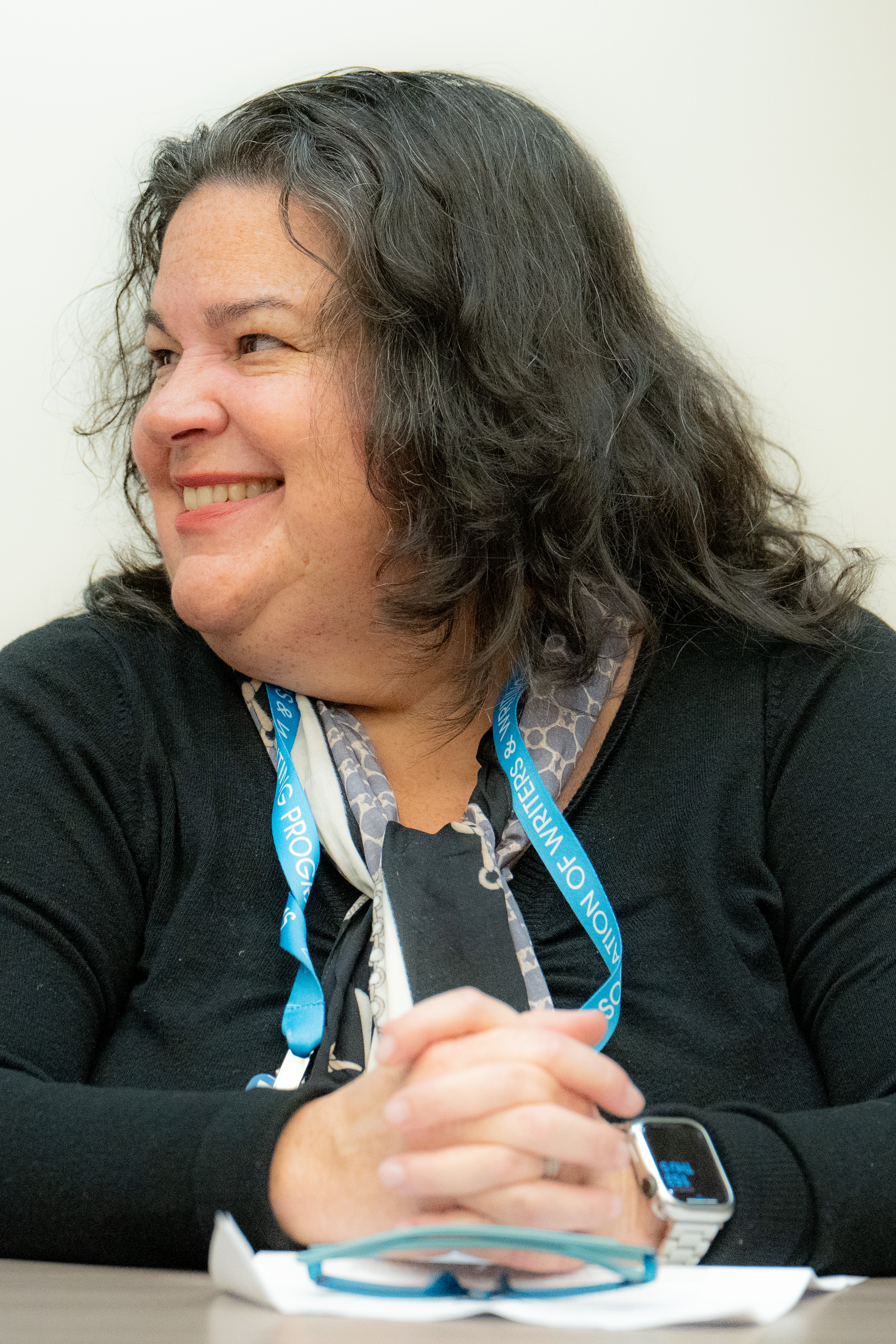
- Moro-Gronlier at AWP 2026
- Born: Los Angeles, California, United States
- Occupations: Poet; Educator
- Website: caridadmoro.com

Caridad Moro-Gronlier is a Cuban-American poet and educator, selected as Miami-Dade County, Florida's second Poet Laureate in April 2024.

== Life ==
Moro-Gronlier was born in Los Angeles to Cuban immigrant parents. Her family moved to South Florida in 1977, where she has lived and worked since.

== Work ==
Moro-Gronlier has published two books of poetry. She has been featured in a number of anthologies and journals and has been a contributing editor to various publications, including Grabbed: Poets and Writers Respond to Sexual Assault. and SWIMM Every Day.

In 2021, her book Tortillera was published by Texas Review Press. Tortillera is a coming of age story, told through poetry, which draws on Moro-Gronlier's experiences as a Latina, mother, and queer woman.The book won The TRP Southern Poetry Breakthrough Series: Florida.

== Bibliography ==
=== Books and chapbooks ===
- Tortillera (2021, TPN, ISBN 978-1-68003-245-1)
- Visionware (2009, Finishing Line Press, ISBN 978-1-59924-344-3)

=== Edited books ===
- Grabbed: Poets and Writers Respond to Sexual Assault, Empowerment and Healing (2020, Beacon Press, ISBN 978-0-8070-7184-7)
