= Animato! =

English magazine dedicated to animation

- Categories: Animation
- Founder: Michael A. Ventrella
- Founded: Summer 1983
- Final issue Number: Spring 1999; 40
- Country: United States
- Based in: Boston, Massachusetts
- Language: English

Animato! was a magazine that was dedicated to animation, generally viewed by animation fans as a successor to Michael Barrier's pioneering Funnyworld and David Mruz's Mindrot/Animania.

== History and profile ==
Animato! was first published in the summer of 1983.The magazine was founded and initially edited by Michael A. Ventrella in Boston in the early 1980s and featured the film Rock & Rule as its first cover. Harry McCracken later become editor and expanded the magazine to full sized with a color cover.

Ventrella later sold the rights to G. Michael Dobbs and Patrick Duquette, who began distributing through newsstands. The magazine was first published under the new ownership in 1992. It ceased publication with issue #40 published in Spring 1999.

== See also ==
- List of film periodicals
