= Here's Your Hat What's Your Hurry =

- First edition (US)
- Author: Elizabeth McCracken
- Language: English
- Genre: Fiction, short story collection
- Published: 1993
- Publisher: Random House (US); Secker & Warburg (UK)
- Publication place: United States

Here's Your Hat What's Your Hurry is a collection of short stories by Elizabeth McCracken first published in 1993 by Random House. It was included on the American Library Association's "List of Notable Books for 1994."

== Stories ==
1. It's Bad Luck to Die
2. Some Have Entertained Angels, Unaware
3. Here's Your Hat What's Your Hurry
4. The Bar of Our Recent Unhappiness
5. Mercedes Kane
6. What We Know About the Lost Aztec Children
7. June
8. Secretary of State
9. The Goings-On of the World
