= List of people with motor neuron disease =

This is a list of notable people who have or had motor neuron diseases, a group of rare neurodegenerative disorders that selectively affect motor neurons, the cells which control voluntary muscles of the body. This includes amyotrophic lateral sclerosis (ALS), progressive bulbar palsy (PBP), pseudobulbar palsy, progressive muscular atrophy (PMA), primary lateral sclerosis (PLS), spinal muscular atrophy (SMA) and monomelic amyotrophy (MMA), as well as some rarer variants resembling ALS.

== Living ==
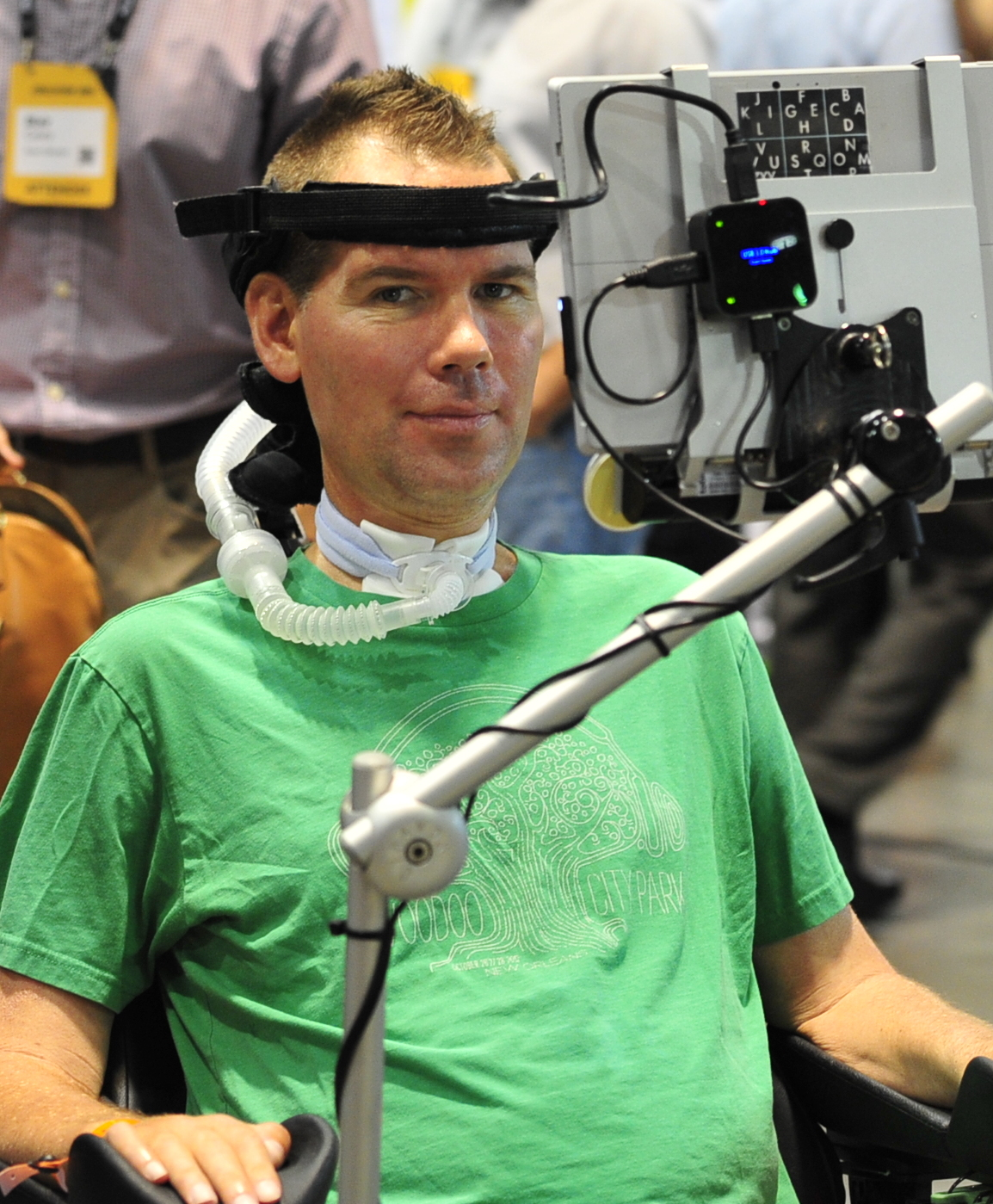
NFL football player Steve Gleason chronicled his experiences with ALS in the documentary Gleason. He was awarded the Congressional Gold Medal for his contributions to ALS awareness.

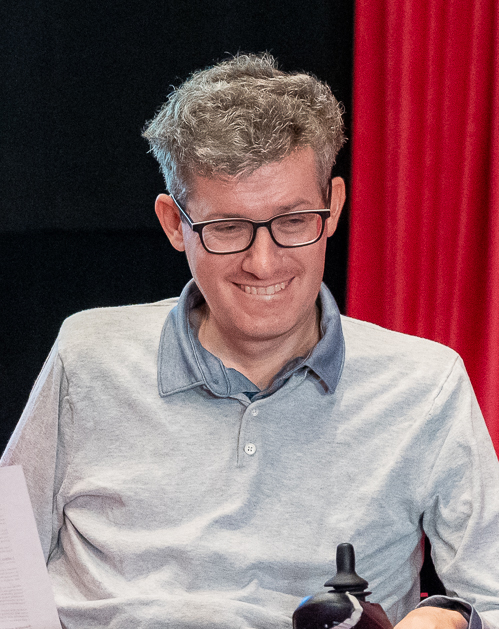
Activist Brian Wallach's advocacy through his foundation I AM ALS saw the Accelerating Access to Critical Therapies for ALS Act signed into law by President Joe Biden in 2021.

- Jai Arrow (born 1995), Australian rugby league player.
- Marcia Ball (born 1949), American singer and pianist.
- Jason Becker (born 1969), American musician, songwriter and composer.
- Jesper Björkman (born 1993), Swedish footballer.
- Jason Bowen (born 1972), Welsh footballer.
- David Bradley (born 1954), American artist.
- Esteban Bullrich (born 1969), Argentine politician.
- Martín Caparrós (born 1957), Argentine writer.
- Nathan Charles (born 1989), Australian rugby union player.
- Bryan Cousins (born 1953), Australian rules footballer.
- Stephen Darby (born 1988), English footballer.
- Antony W. Diamond (born 1944), British-Canadian ecologist.
- Daniel L. Doctoroff (born 1958), American businessman and government official.
- Yasuhiko Funago (born 1957), Japanese politician.
- Guilhem Gallart (born 1973), French record producer.
- Natalie Gauld, New Zealand pharmacist.
- Steve Gleason (born 1977), American football player.
- Kerry Goode (born 1965), American football player.
- Tim Green (born 1963), American football player, commentator and author.
- Frank Hansen (born 1952), American bobsledder.
- John Driskell Hopkins (born 1971), American bassist (Zac Brown Band).
- Chris Johnson (born 1985), American football player.
- Sarah Langs (born 1993), American sportswriter.
- Aaron Lazar (born 1976), American actor.
- Glenn Love (born 1989), American football player.
- Spyros Marangos (born 1967), Greek football player and manager.
- Ed Martin (born 1962), American football player.
- Lewis Moody (born 1978), English rugby union player.
- Emanuel Morales (born 1987), Argentine footballer.
- Premana Premadi (born 1964), Indonesian astronomer.
- Rebel (born 1978), American professional wrestler.
- Claire Reilly, New Zealand disability rights activist.
- Petter Rudi (born 1973), Norwegian footballer.
- Tim Shaw (born 1984), American football player.
- Ed Slater (born 1988), English rugby union player.
- Eric Stevens (born 1989), American football player.
- Marcus Stewart (born 1972), English footballer.
- Kyousei Tsukui (born 1961), Japanese voice actor.
- Juan Carlos Unzué (born 1967), Spanish footballer and manager.
- Emma Vulin (born c. 1980), Australian politician.
- Brian Wallach (born 1980), American activist.
- Witold Waszczykowski (born 1957), Polish politician.
- Ken Waters (born 1961), Welsh rugby union player.
- Moamen Zakaria (born 1988), Egyptian footballer.

== Deceased ==
=== A ===
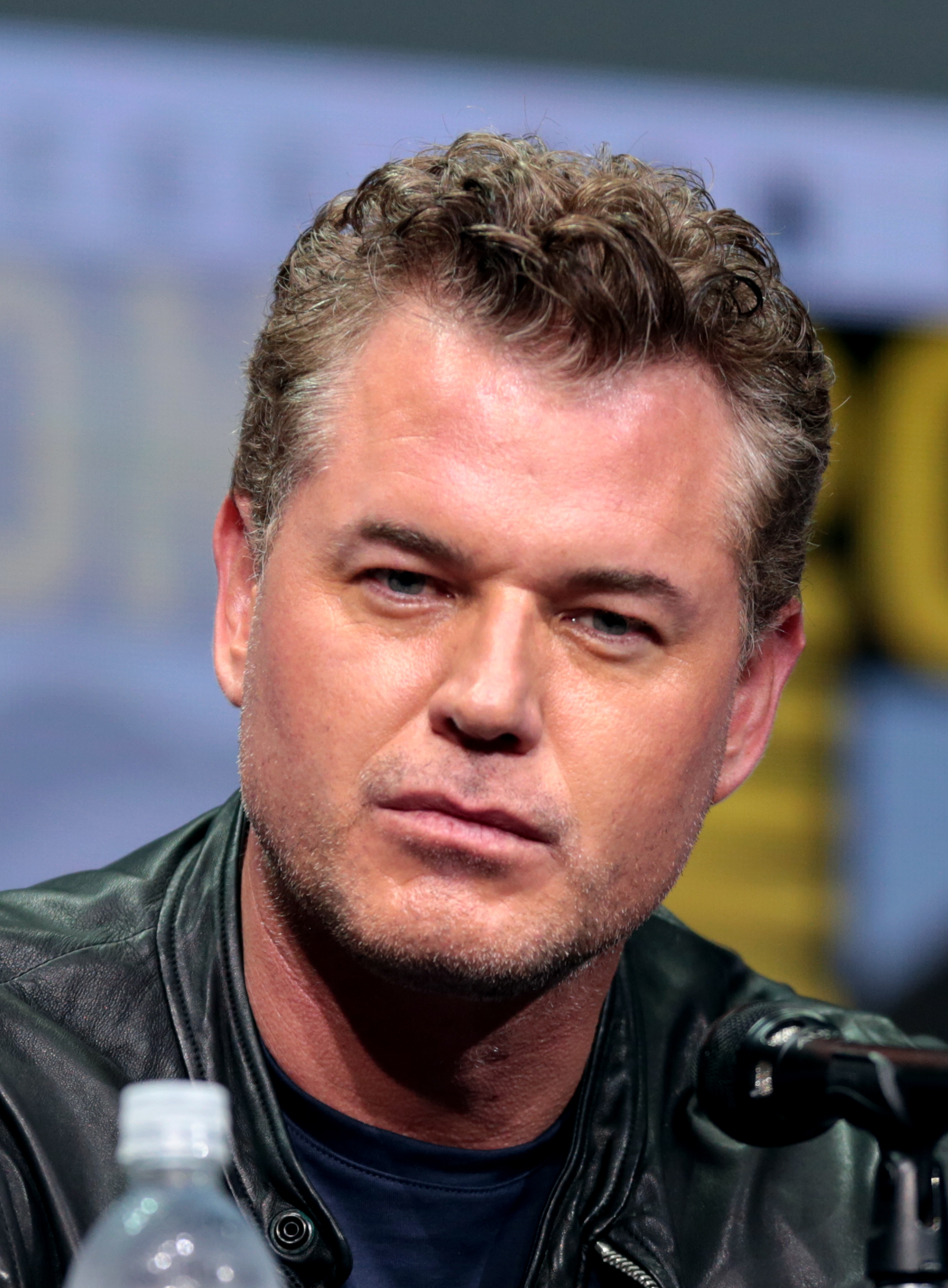
Actor Eric Dane's death 10 months after announcing his diagnosis of the disease prompted a 200% increase in the donations the ALS Foundation received.

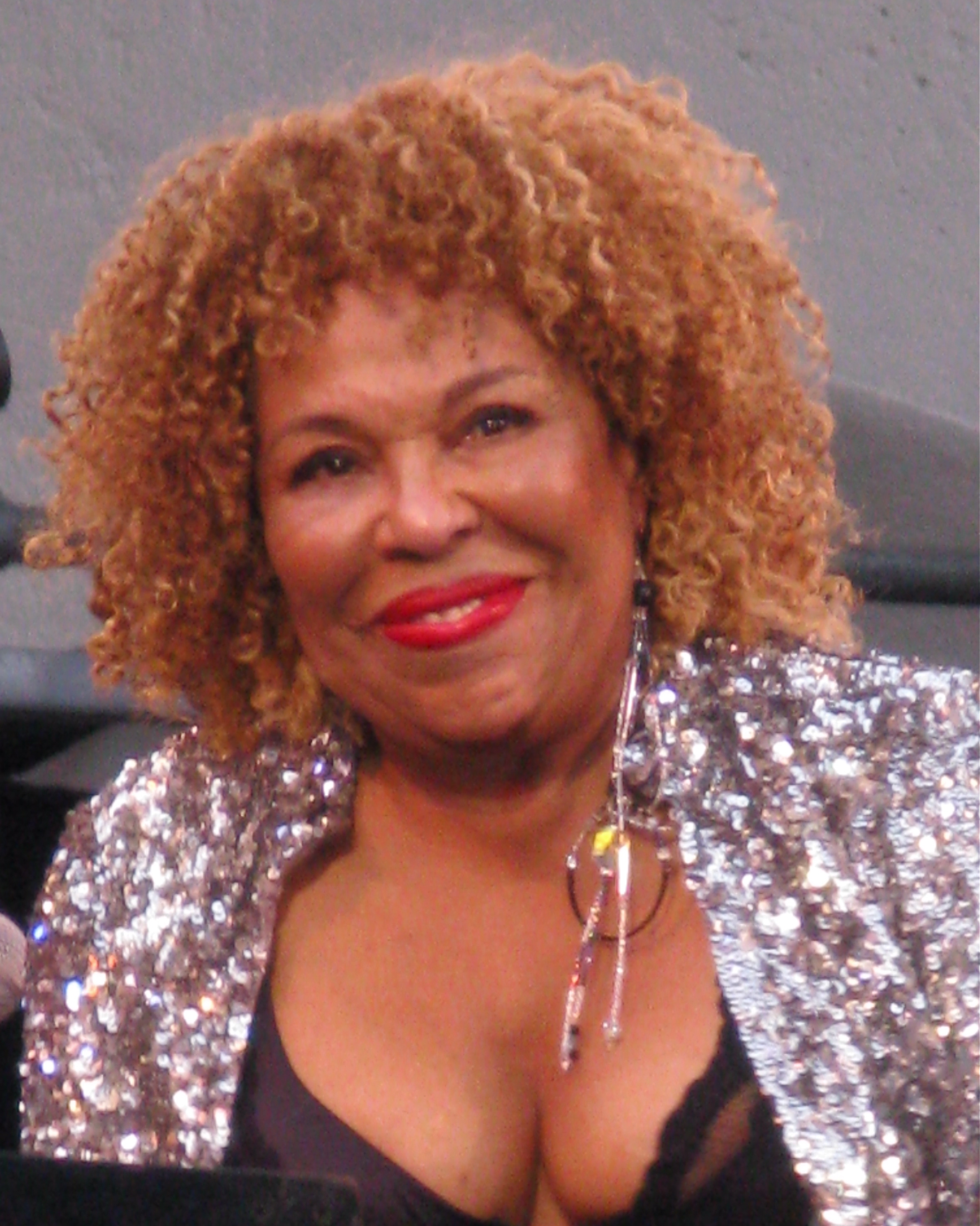
Singer Roberta Flack was forced to end her 54 year singing career upon her diagnosis with ALS in 2022.

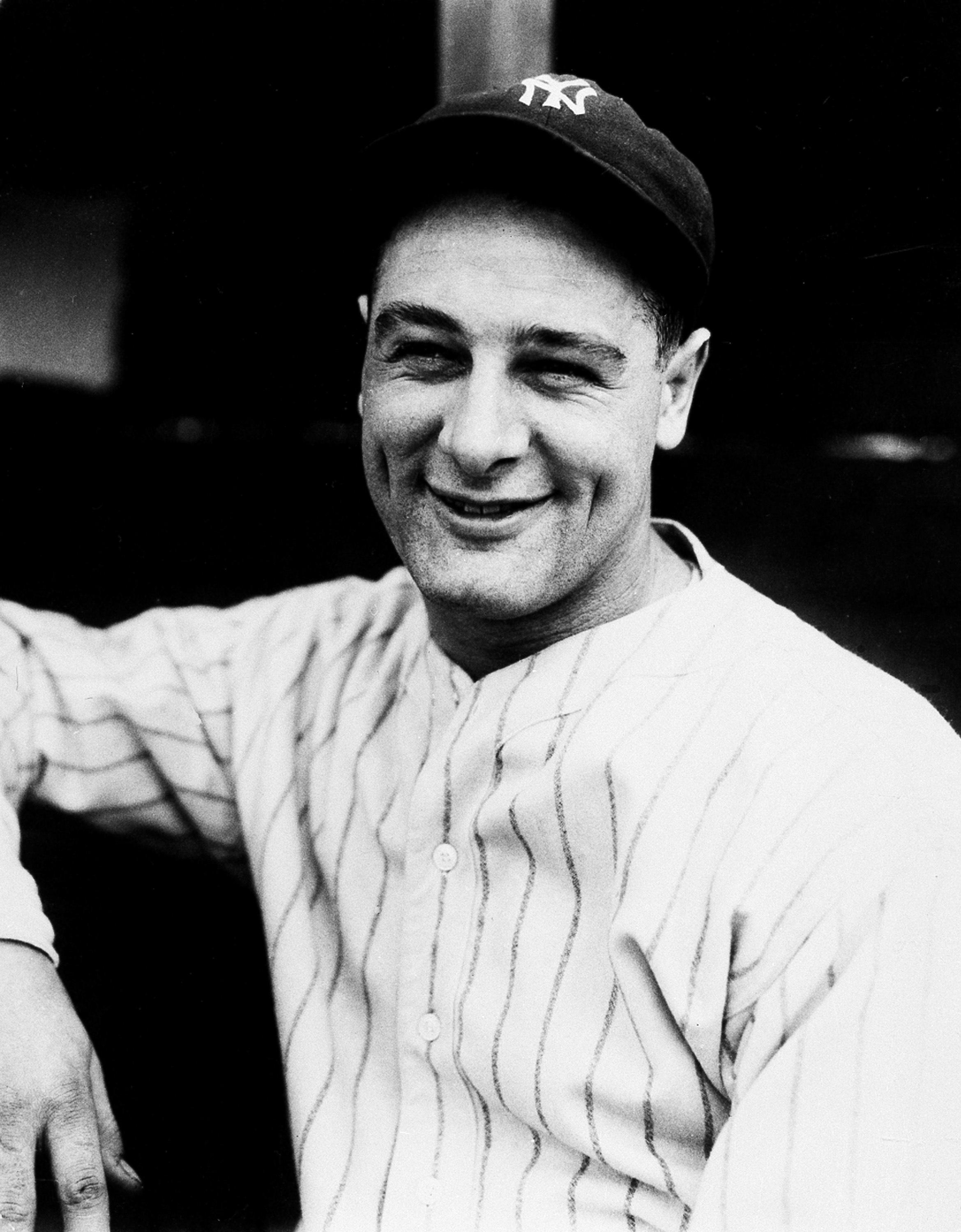
Public awareness of the disease gained prominence upon the diagnosis of baseball player Lou Gehrig, whose name would become an alternative title for the disease.

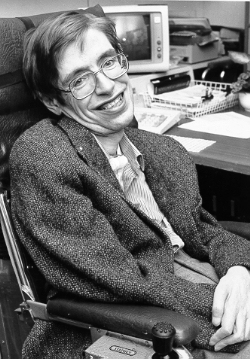
Astrophysicist Stephen Hawking, whose ALS was diagnosed in 1963, had the disease for 55 years, the longest recorded time one had the disease. He died at the age of 76 in 2018.

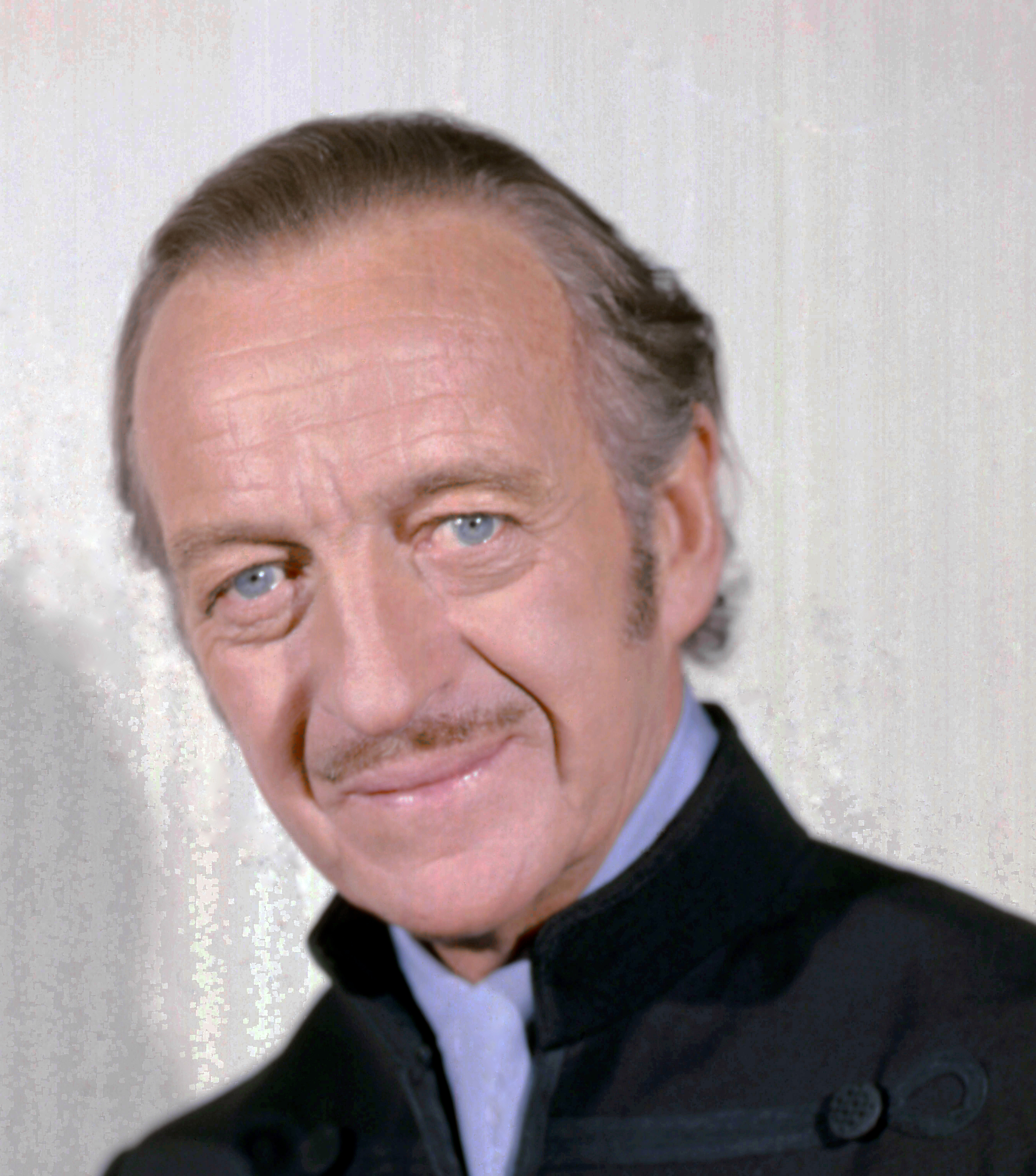
Actor David Niven began showing symptoms of ALS in interviews, and would be officially diagnosed in 1980.

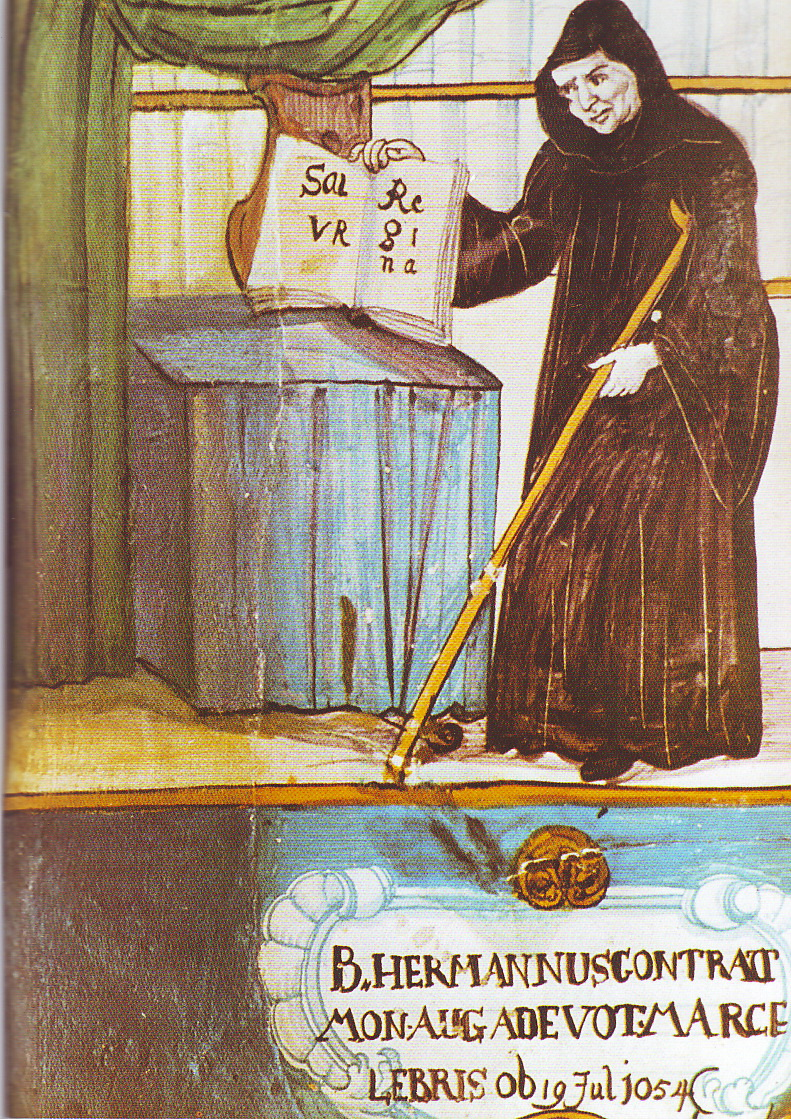
The 11th century monk Hermann of Reichenau had a lifelong disease that is considered likely to have been ALS. This would make him one of the earliest known patients of the disease.

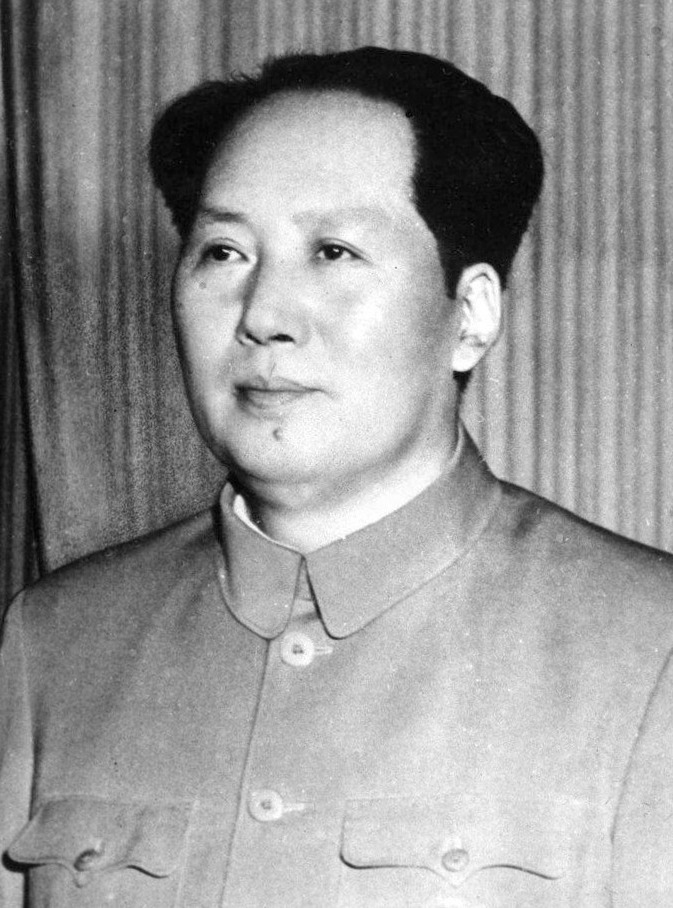
Chairman Mao Zedong was reported to have been suffering from ALS later in his life.

- Eddie Adams (1933–2004), American photographer.
- Geoff Ablett (1955–2026), Australian rules footballer.
- José Afonso (1929–1987), Portuguese singer-songwriter, revolutionist against the Estado Novo regime.
- Gordon Aikman (1985–2017), British political researcher and motor neurone disease campaigner.
- Frank Alamo (1941–2012), French singer.
- Moustafa Ali (1965-2025), Egyptian-born Canadian football player.
- Bruce Allpress (1930–2020), New Zealand actor.
- David Ames (1937–2009), American football player.
- Pietro Anastasi (1948–2020), Italian footballer.
- Billy Anderson (1941–1996), American football player.
- Miguel Ángel (1947–2024), Spanish footballer.
- Paraskevas Antzas (1976-2026), Greek footballer.
- Hideyuki Ashihara (1944–1995), Japanese karate master.

=== B ===
- Edda Heiðrún Backman (1957–2016), Icelandic actor.
- Dale Baer (1950–2021), American animator.
- Derek Bailey (1930–2005), English guitarist.
- Victor Bailey (1960–2016), American bassist (Weather Report).
- Ben Baldanza (1961–2024), American economist and airline executive.
- Katharine Balfour (1921–1990), American actor.
- Wade Barber (1944–2022), American lawyer.
- Ady Barkan (1983–2023), American lawyer and political activist.
- Marc Basnight (1947–2020), American politician.
- Richard Beeman (1942–2016), American historian.
- Mauril Bélanger (1955–2016), Canadian politician.
- Emory Bellard (1927–2011), American college football coach.
- Randall C. Berg Jr. (1949–2019), American attorney.
- Giovanni Bertini (1951–2019), Italian footballer.
- Eddie Bevans (1985–2026), Irish hurler.
- Nicholas Bianco (1932–1994), American mobster.
- Ashley Bickerton (1959–2022), Barbadian-born American visual artist.
- Charlie Bird (1949–2024), Irish journalist.
- Beatle Bob (1953–2023), American dancer.
- Sian Blake (1972–2015), British actress.
- Joe Bonsall (1948–2024), American singer.
- Stefano Borgonovo (1964–2013), Italian footballer
- Jeff Bourne (1948–2014), English footballer.
- Laurent Bouvet (1968–2021), French political scientist.
- Michael Bowden (1947–2020), Australian footballer.
- Skipper Bowles (1919–1986), American politician.
- Ger Brady (1980–2024), Irish Gaelic footballer.
- Fred Branfman (1942–2014), American anti-war activist and author.
- Scott Brazil (1955–2006), American television producer.
- Barbara Brenner (1951–2013), American health activist.
- O. J. Brigance (1969–2026), American football player.
- Donna Britt (1958–2021), American news anchor.
- Harry Browne (1933–2006), American politician.
- Jens Bullerjahn (1962–2022), German politician.
- Rob Burrow (1982–2024), English rugby league player.
- Heinz Burt (1942–2000), German-born British bassist and singer.
- Ben Byer (1971–2008), American playwright, subject of the film Indestructible, documenting his life post-diagnosis.

=== C ===
- Jeff Cannonball (1987–2026), American professional wrestler.
- Jeff Capel II (1953–2017), American basketball coach.
- Jim Caple (1962–2023), American sportswriter.
- Linda Carlson (1945–2021), American actor.
- Alicinha Cavalcanti (1962–2021), Brazilian event promoter.
- Jane Cederqvist (1945–2023), Swedish Olympic swimmer.
- Paul Cellucci (1948–2013), American politician and diplomat.
- Ezzard Charles (1921–1975), American professional boxer.
- Neil Cherry (1936–2003), New Zealand environmental scientist.
- Marián Čišovský (1979–2020), Slovak footballer.
- Dwight Clark (1957–2018), American football player.
- Preston Cloud (1912–1991), American earth scientist.
- Sammy Conn (1961–2014), Scottish footballer and manager.
- Gerry Conway (1947–2024), English drummer.
- Ronnie Corbett (1930–2016), Scottish comedian and actor.
- John Coster-Mullen (1946–2021), American nuclear archaeologist.
- Kevin Cullen (1922–1994), Australian medical doctor, researcher, and winemaker.
- John Curran (1953–2013), American financial journalist.
- George Curry (1944–2016), American football coach.
- Cyril Cusack (1910–1993), Irish actor.

=== D ===
- Eric Dane (1972–2026), American actor.
- Neale Daniher (1961 - 2026), Australian rules football player.
- Erroll Davis (1944–2026), American politician.
- Garth Dawley (1933–2020), Canadian journalist.
- Dennis Day (1916–1988), American singer and actor.
- Patrick Dean (1976–2021), American cartoonist.
- Dieter Dengler (1938–2001), German-American aviator POW.
- Pierre Deny (1956–2026), French actor.
- Papa Bouba Diop (1978–2020), Senegalese footballer.
- Rickey Dixon (1966–2020), American football player.
- Masayuki Dobashi (1935–2013), Japanese baseball player and manager.
- Jim Dooley (1930–2008), American football player and coach.
- Ann Downer (1960–2015), American author.
- Jo-Anna Downey (1967–2016), Canadian comedian.
- Brad Drewett (1958–2013), Australian tennis player and sports administrator.
- John Drury (1927–2007), American news anchor.
- Brad Dusek (1950–2024), American football player.

=== E ===
- Brooke Eby (1988–2026), American business development manager and social media personality.
- Richard Ellman (1918–1987), American literary critic.
- Cai Emmons (1951–2023), American author.
- Sam English (1908–1967), Northern Irish footballer.
- Jenifer Estess (1963–2003), American theatre producer and activist, subject of HBO film Jennifer; founding member of Project ALS.

=== F ===
- László Fazekas (1947–2026), Hungarian footballer.
- Richard J. Ferris (1936–2022), American businessman.
- Pete Frates (1984–2018), American baseball player and co-founder of the Ice Bucket Challenge.
- Rose Finn-Kelcey (1945–2014), British artist.
- Anto Finnegan (1973–2021), Northern Irish Gaelic footballer.
- Hal Finney (1956–2014), American computer scientist.
- Jay S. Fishman (1952–2016), American business executive.
- Simon Fitzmaurice (1973–2017), Irish film director.
- Roberta Flack (1937–2025), American singer.
- Roberto Fontanarrosa (1944–2007), Argentine cartoonist, comics artist and writer.
- Phil Freelon (1953–2019), American architect.
- Adam Kelso Fulton (1929–1994), Scottish rugby union player.

=== G ===
- Scott Gale (1965–2004), Australian rugby league player.
- Lou Gehrig (1903–1941), American baseball player.
- Vic Gilliam (1953–2020), American politician.
- Richard Glatzer (1952–2015), American film director and screenwriter.
- Laurence Gluck (1953–2024), American real estate investor and landlord.
- Sonny Gordon (1965–2023), American football player.
- Mike Gregory (1964–2007), English rugby league player.
- Nina Griscom (1954–2020), American model and television host.
- Stanislav Gross (1969–2015), Czech politician, Prime Minister of the Czech Republic.
- Andrew Gunn (1969–2026), Canadian film producer.

=== H ===
- Ingrid Hafner (1936–1994), British actor.
- David Hagen (1973–2020), Scottish footballer.
- Jacques Haitkin (1950–2023), American cinematographer.
- Darryl Hammond (1967–2017), American football player.
- Phil Hancock (1953–2024), American professional golfer.
- Stephen Hawking (1942–2018), English theoretical physicist.
- Mo Hayder (1962–2021), British author.
- Toshiko Hayashi (1940–2022), Japanese politician.
- Tony Hendra (1941–2021), British comedian and actor.
- Peter Hermann (1952–2026), German football player and manager.
- Hermann of Reichenau (1013–1054), German Benedictine monk and scholar.
- Pierce Higgins (1977–2023), Irish hurler.
- Wally Hilgenberg (1942–2008), American football player
- Stephen Hillenburg (1961–2018), American animator, creator of SpongeBob SquarePants.
- Jeremy Hindley (1944–2013), British horse trainer.
- Rob Hindmarch (1961–2002), English footballer.
- Bob Holman (1936–2016), British academic.
- Tony Hopper (1976–2018), English footballer.
- Alexis Hunter (1948–2014), New Zealand painter and photographer.
- Catfish Hunter (1946–1999), American baseball player.

=== I ===
- Giancarlo Ibarguen (1963–2016), Guatemalan businessman and academic.
- Tunch Ilkin (1957–2021), Turkish-American football player and broadcaster.
- Mick Imlah (1956–2009), Scottish poet.
- Tari Ito (1951–2021), Japanese performance artist.

=== J ===
- Jacob Javits (1904–1986), American politician.
- Axel Jensen (1932–2003), Norwegian author.
- Derrick Jensen (1956–2017), American football player.
- Egil Johansen (1962–2023), Norwegian footballer.
- Lenny Johnrose (1969–2022), English footballer.
- Jimmy Johnstone (1944–2006), Scottish footballer.
- Ronald Joseph (1944–2026), American pair skater.
- Tony Judt (1948–2010), British-American historian.

=== K ===
- Gordon Kannegiesser (1945–2022), Canadian ice hockey player.
- Novy Kapadia (1952–2021), Indian football journalist.
- Jaan Kaplinski (1941–2021), Estonian author, translator, philosopher, and culture critic.
- Dániel Karsai (1977–2024), Hungarian lawyer
- Yuzo Kawashima (1918–1963), Japanese film director.
- Norman Kay (1929–2001), British composer.
- George Keiser (1946–2021), American politician.
- Hans Keller (1919–1985), Austrian-born British musician and writer.
- Khaled Khan (1958–2013), Bangladeshi actor.
- Shahidul Islam Khokon (1957–2016), Bangladeshi filmmaker.
- Motoo Kimura (1924–1994), Japanese biologist.
- Suna Kıraç (1941–2020), Turkish-American businesswoman.
- Mark Kirton (1958–2025), Canadian ice hockey player.
- George Kooymans (1948–2025), Dutch musician (Golden Earring).
- Mark R. Kravitz (1950–2012), American judge.
- Harry Kroto (1939–2016), English chemist.
- Mike Kullman (1962–2003), American football player.

=== L ===
- Jean-Yves Lafesse (1957–2021), French humorist and actor.
- Hannu Lahtinen (1960–2020), Finnish wrestler.
- John Land (1938–2021), British field hockey player.
- Gary LaPaille (1954–2022), American politician.
- Dusty LaValley (1981–2026), Canadian bareback rider.
- Lead Belly (1888–1949), American singer.
- David Lawrence (1964-2025), English cricketer.
- Scott Lew (1968–2017), American film director and screenwriter.
- Stefan Lindqvist (1967–2020), Swedish footballer.
- Tinus Linee (1969–2014), South African rugby player.
- Tony Liscio (1940–2017), American football player.
- Leonard Lopate (1940–2025), American radio personality.
- Eric Lowen (1951-2012), American musician (Lowen & Navarro).
- Uuno Öpik (1926–2005), Estonian born atomic physicist
- Klemens Ludwig (1955–2022), German astrologist.
- Rebecca Luker (1961–2020), American actor and singer.
- Antoine "T.C.D." Lundy (1963–1998), American musician (Force MDs).
- Francisco Luzón (1948–2021), Spanish banker.

=== M ===
- Euan MacDonald (1974–2024), Scottish entrepreneur
- Fiona MacDonald (1956/7-2024), Australian television presenter.
- Brenda MacGibbon (1944–2022), Canadian mathematician.
- David MacLennan (1948–2014), Scottish actor.
- Willie Maddren (1951–2000), English footballer.
- Pave Maijanen (1950–2021), Finnish musician.
- Sergei Mandreko (1971–2022), Russian-Tajik footballer.
- Mao Zedong (1893–1976), Chinese leader.
- Tu'u Maori (1988–2022), Papua New Guinean rugby league player.
- Mickey Marvin (1955–2017), American football player.
- John Masius (1950–2025), American television writer and producer.
- Takeaki Matsumoto (1959–2026), Japanese politician.
- Scott Matzka (1978–2018), American ice hockey player.
- Nicky McFadden (1962–2014), Irish politician.
- Mike McGlinchey (1944–1997), American college football coach.
- Steve McMichael (1957–2025), American football player and professional wrestler.
- Fred McNeill (1952–2015), American football player.
- Jim McMullan (1936–2019), American actor.
- David McSkimming (1950–2016), Australian pianist.
- Mark Merlis (1950–2017), American writer and health policy analyst.
- Brian Merrett (1945–2023), Canadian photographer and architectural activist.
- Gerasimos Michelis (1965–2025), Greek actor
- Denny Miller (1934–2014), American actor.
- Sherron Mills (1971–2016), American basketball player.
- Charles Mingus (1922–1979), American jazz composer and bandleader.
- Ray Minus (1964–2023), Bahamian boxer.
- Kenneth Mitchell (1974–2024), Canadian actor.
- Kyle Morrell (1963–2020), American football player.
- Ivo Mosley (1951–2024), British writer and potter.
- Matthew Saad Muhammad (1954–2014), American boxer.
- Colm Murray (1952–2013), Irish broadcaster.

=== N ===
- Dawn Clark Netsch (1926–2013), American politician.
- Arch Nicholson (1941–1990), Australian film director.
- Augie Nieto (1958–2023), American entrepreneur, founder of Life Fitness.
- David Niven (1910–1983), British actor.
- Krzysztof Nowak (1975-2005), Polish footballer.

=== O ===
- Pablo Olivares (1965–2014), Spanish film writer and producer.
- Juan Carlos Orellana (1955–2022), Chilean footballer.

=== P ===
- Carlos Pacheco (1961–2022), Spanish comic book artist.
- Neon Park (1940–1993), American artist.
- Michael Patrick (1990–2026), Irish actor.
- Marty Pavelich (1927–2024), Canadian ice hockey player.
- Aleksandar Petrović (1959–2014), Serbian basketball coach.
- Ricardo Piglia (1941–2017), Argentine author.
- Scott Pilarz (1959–2021), American academic administrator.
- Christopher Pitchford (1947–2017), British judge.
- Polly Platt (1939–2011), American production designer and film producer.
- Jim Poole (1966–2023), American baseball player.
- Mike Porcaro (1955–2015), American musician (Toto).
- Boris Powell (1964–2022), American boxer.
- Sergei Eduardovich Prikhodko (1957–2021), Russian diplomat and government official, former deputy prime minister (2013–2018).
- Greet Prins (1954–2026), Dutch politician.
- Anton Pronk (1941–2016), Dutch footballer.

=== Q ===
- Patrick Quinn (1983–2020), American co-founder of the Ice Bucket Challenge

=== R ===
- David Redden (1949–2024), American auctioneer.
- James C. Renick (1948–2021), American academic administrator.
- Don Revie (1927–1989), English footballer and manager.
- Fernando Ricksen (1976–2019), Dutch footballer.
- Tommy Robson (1944–2020), English footballer.
- Sue Rodriguez (1950–1994), Canadian right to die activist.
- Paola Roldán (1981–2024), Ecuadorian businesswoman and philanthropist.
- Ross the Boss (1954–2026), American guitarist.
- Benet Rossell (1937–2016), Spanish artist.

=== S ===
- Stanley Sadie (1930–2005), English musicologist.
- Tetsurō Sagawa (1937–2021), Japanese actor.
- Börje Salming (1951–2022), Swedish ice hockey player.
- Washington César Santos (1960–2014), Brazilian footballer.
- Mike Schwartz (1950–2013), American anti-abortion activist.
- Morrie Schwartz (1916–1995), American sociology professor, subject of Tuesdays with Morrie.
- Peter Scott-Morgan, (1957–2022), English-American scientist.
- Kim Shattuck (1963–2019), American singer and songwriter (The Muffs).
- Luton Shelton (1985–2021), Jamaican footballer.
- Sam Shepard (1943–2017), American actor and playwright.
- Dmitri Shostakovich (1906-1975), Soviet composer.
- Michael Shute (1951–2020), Canadian academic.
- Gianluca Signorini (1960–2002), Italian footballer.
- Keith Skillen (1948–2013), English footballer.
- Thomas Sleeper (1956–2022), American conductor.
- Lane Smith (1936–2005), American actor.
- Steve Smith (1964–2021), American football player.
- Chris Snow (1981–2023), Canadian ice hockey executive.
- Michael Soles (1966–2021), Canadian football player.
- Jack B. Sowards (1929–2007), American screenwriter.
- Jadranka Stojaković (1950–2016), Bosnian singer.
- Jon Stone (1931–1997), American television writer.
- Petri Sulonen (1963–2024), Finnish footballer.
- Ezra Swerdlow (1953–2018), American film producer.

=== T ===
- Maxwell D. Taylor (1901–1987), American general and diplomat.
- Tempt One (1969–2023), American graffiti artist.
- Jim Thistle (1955–2016), Canadian politician.
- Orlando Thomas (1972–2014), American football player.
- Robin Thomas (1962–2020), Czech-American mathematician.
- Stacy Title (1964–2021), American director, screenwriter and producer.
- Torao Tokuda (1938–2024), Japanese physician and politician.
- Dan Toler (1948–2013), American guitarist.
- David Tomassoni (1952–2022), American politician.
- Francis Tsai (1967–2015), American comic book artist.
- Kevin Turner (1969–2016), American football player.

=== V ===
- Bea Van der Maat (1960–2023), Belgian singer, television presenter and actor
- Dmitri Vasilenko (1975–2019), Russian gymnast.
- Angelo Venosa (1954–2022), Brazilian sculptor.
- Bob Vidler (1957–2023), Australian cricketer.

=== W ===
- Roy Walford (1924–2004), American pathologist.
- Henry A. Wallace (1888–1965), American politician, 33rd Vice President of the United States.
- Carl Webb (1981–2023), Australian rugby league player.
- Robert Webber (1924–1989), American actor.
- Charlie Wedemeyer (1946–2010), American high school teacher and football coach.
- Paul C. Weiler (1939–2021), Canadian lawyer and professor.
- Irv Weinstein (1930–2017), American news anchor.
- Doddie Weir (1970–2022), Scottish rugby union player.
- Joost van der Westhuizen (1971–2017), South African rugby union player.
- Geoff Wheel (1951–2024), Welsh rugby union player.
- William White (1966–2022), American football player.
- Evelyn Wilson (1959–2026), American judge.
- Mitch Wilson (1962–2019), Canadian ice hockey player.
- Baron Wolman (1937–2020), American photographer.
- Rocky Wood (1959–2014), New Zealand-Australian writer.
- Lynn Wright (1952–2022), American politician.
- Robert C. Wright (1944–2014), American politician.

=== Y ===
- George Yardley (1928–2004), American basketball player.
- Justin Yerbury (1974–2023), Australian molecular biologist.
- Marius Žaliūkas (1983–2020), Lithuanian footballer

=== Z ===
- Michael Zaslow (1942–1998), American actor.
