= Byer =

Byer is a surname. Notable people with the surname include:

- Ben Byer, American stage actor and playwright
- Tom Byer, American professional soccer player
- Paul Byer, InterVarsity staff worker
- George Byer, American politician
- Nicole Byer, American comedian, actress, writer, and television host
- Renée C. Byer, American photojournalist
- Robert L. Byer, American physicist
- Aram Byer James, Santa Clara County, CA Assistant Public Defender, police watchdog, social activist, and civil rights attorney
- Esther Byer-Suckoo, Barbadian physician and politician
- Kathryn Stripling Byer, American poet and teacher

== See also ==
- Byer, Ohio, unincorporated community in Ohio, United States
- Byer Covered Bridge, covered bridge in United States
- Kleiner Perkins Caufield Byer, American venture capital firm
- Byers (surname)
- Bye (surname)
