= Bye (surname) =

Bye is an English, Norwegian, and Swedish surname. Variations of the surname include By and Buy, among others. The English surname is derived from Middle English bye "bend" (from Old English byge, a derivative of bugan "to bow"). The Norwegian and Swedish surname is derived from a habitational name from any of various farms named By, from Old Norse býr "farm."

Notable people with the surname include:

- Alfred Bye (1899–1941), Australian murderer
- Bendik Bye (born 1990), Norwegian footballer
- Beth Bye, American politician
- Brandon Bye (born 1995), American soccer player
- Brian Bye (born 1954), Canadian ice hockey player
- Chris Bye (disambiguation), multiple people
- Ed Bye (born 1955), English TV producer and director
- Eirik Bye (born 1995), Norwegian skier
- James Bye (actor) (born 1984), English actor
- James Bye (footballer) (1920–1995), English footballer
- John By (1779–1836), founder of the Canadian capital, Ottawa
- Kermit Edward Bye (1937–2021), American judge
- Matti Bye (born 1966), Swedish pianist and composer
- Nicholas Bye (born 1960), English politician
- Odd Bye (1916–2010), Norwegian politician and journalist
- Oskar Bye (1870–1939), Norwegian gymnast
- Robert Bye (1889–1962), Welsh army sergeant
- Ronald Bye (1937–2018), Norwegian politician

== See also ==
- Byer, a surname
