= Byers (surname) =

Byers is a surname. Notable people with the surname include:

== People ==
- Brad Byers, American stunt performer
- Eben Byers, American socialite and victim of radiation poisoning
- Horace R. Byers (1906–1998), American meteorologist
- Howard Webster Byers (1856–1928), American politician
- Jeremiah Byers (born 2001), American football player
- John Byers (architect), Southern Californian architect and builder noted for use of the Spanish Colonial Revival style
- Joseph Byers (1824–1898), American politician from Maryland
- Kevin Byers (born 1979), Scottish footballer
- Lefty Byers (1905–2000), American professional basketball coach
- Lyndon Byers (1964–2025), Canadian ice hockey player and radio DJ
- Margaret Byers (1832–1912), Irish educator, activist, social reformer, missionary, writer
- Neil Erland Byers (1928–2020), Canadian politician
- Nina Byers (1930–2014), theoretical physicist
- Peter Byers (footballer) (born 1984), Antiguan football striker
- Peter Byers (field hockey) (born 1944), New Zealand Olympic field hockey player
- Roddy Byers, English musician; lead guitarist in The Specials
- Stephen Byers, British politician; the Labour Member of Parliament for Tyneside North and a former cabinet minister
- Tom Byers (athlete) (born 1956), former middle-distance runner
- Tom Byers (professor), professor at Stanford University
- Verne Byers (1918–2008), bandleader, bassist, concert promoter
- William Byers (1831–1903), founding figure of Omaha, Nebraska

== Fictional characters ==
- John Fitzgerald Byers, one of the Three Lone Gunmen in The X-Files
- Jonathan Byers, the son of Joyce Byers and older brother of Will Byers from the Netflix series Stranger Things
- Joyce Byers, the mother of Jonathan and Will Byers from the Netflix series Stranger Things
- Will Byers, the younger brother of Jonathan Byers and the son of Joyce Byers, from the Netflix series Stranger Things

== See also ==
- Byers (disambiguation)
- Byer
- Byars (surname)
