= List of Toronto Maple Leafs records =

This is a list of franchise records for the Toronto Maple Leafs of the National Hockey League.

== Franchise records ==
=== Franchise single season ===
Most points	115	2021–22
Most wins	54	2021–22
Most home wins	31	2021–22
Most away wins	25	2024–25
Most losses	52	1984–85 (80 game season)
Most ties^{†}	22	1954–55 (70 game season)
Most overtime losses^{‡}	15	2016–17
Most goals for	337	1989–90 (80 game season)
Most power play goals for	107	2005–06
Most goals against	387	1983–84 (80 game season)
Fewest points	10; 48	1918–19 (18 game season); 1984–85 (80 game season)
Fewest wins	5; 20	1918–19 (18 game season); 1981–82, 1984–85 (80 game seasons)
Fewest losses	9; 21	1917–18 (22 game season), 1920–21 (24 game season); 2021–22, 2022–23 (82 game season)
Fewest ties^{†}	0; 4	1917–18 (22 game season), 1918–19 (18 game season), 1919–20, 1920–21, 1923–24 (24 game seasons), 1924–25 (30 game season); 1989–90 (80 game season)
Fewest overtime losses^{‡}	3	1999–2000, 2002–03, 2003–04
Fewest goals for	59; 194	1923–24 (24 game season); 1997–98
Fewest goals against	69; 176	1928–29 (44 game season); 1967–68 (74 game season)
Most penalty minutes	2419	1989–90 (80 game season)
Fewest penalty minutes	114; 570	1921–22 (24 game season); 2017–18 (82 game season)
Most shutouts	13	1953–54 (Harry Lumley 13, Gilles Mayer 0)

- † Ties are no longer possible since the end of the 2003–04 NHL season.
- ‡ Overtime losses became an official NHL statistic in the 1999–2000 NHL season and replaced the 'tie' statistic beginning in the 2005–06 NHL season.

=== Franchise single game ===
Most goals total	20	January 8, 1986 (W 11–9 vs. Edmonton Oilers)
Most goals for	14	March 16, 1957 (W 14–1 vs. New York Rangers)
Most goals against	14	March 19, 1981 (L 14–4 vs. Buffalo Sabres)
Biggest margin of victory	+13	March 16, 1957 (W 14–1 vs. New York Rangers); January 2, 1971 (W 13–0 vs. Detroit Red Wings)
Biggest margin of defeat	-11	January 18, 1964 (L 11–0 vs. Boston Bruins); December 26, 1991 (L 12–1 vs. Pittsburgh Penguins)
Most shots for	64	May 3, 1993 (W 2–1 [2OT] vs. St. Louis Blues), 2nd round, Game 1
Fewest shots for	6	May 8, 2000 Stanley Cup Playoffs vs New Jersey Devils, 2nd round, game 6
Fewest shots against	10	January 5, 2002 (W 3–1 vs Ottawa Senators); October 28, 2014 (W 4–0 vs Buffalo Sabres)
Most power play goals for	7	October 14, 2005 (9–1 at Atlanta Thrashers)
Most penalty minutes	154	November 15, 1986 (33 penalties, W 6–0 vs. Detroit Red Wings)
Most penalty minutes, opponent	160	January 13, 1986 (33 penalties, W 7–4 vs. Detroit Red Wings)
Fastest goal	0:04^{†}	December 29, 1988 vs. Quebec Nordiques (3rd period, Ed Olczyk at 5:24, Gary Leeman at 5:28); March 27, 2014 vs. Philadelphia Flyers (2nd period, James van Riemsdyk at 19:56)
Fastest goal to start a game	0:07	February 6, 1932 vs. Boston Bruins (Charlie Conacher); January 3, 2019 vs. Minnesota Wild (Mitch Marner)
Longest game	164:46	April 3, 1933 vs. Boston Bruins (6th overtime period, Ken Doraty at 4:46)

- † Tied with NHL record

=== Franchise streaks ===
Winning streaks
Overall	10	October 7, 1993 – October 28, 1993
Home	13	January 31, 2018 – March 24, 2018
Away	7	November 14, 1940 – December 15, 1940; December 4, 1960 – January 5, 1961; January 29, 2003 – February 22, 2003; October 27, 2021 - November 28, 2021
Losing streaks
Overall	11	January 12, 2015 – February 6, 2015
Home	11	February 11, 2012 – March 29, 2012
Away	16	January 2, 2015 – March 1, 2015
Undefeated streaks
Overall	11	October 15, 1950 – November 8, 1950 (8 wins, 3 ties); January 6, 1994 – February 1, 1994 (7 wins, 4 ties)
Home	18	November 28, 1933 – March 10, 1934 (15 wins, 3 ties); October 31, 1953 – January 23, 1954 (16 wins, 2 ties)
Away	9	November 30, 1947 – January 11, 1948 (4 wins, 5 ties)
Winless streaks
Overall	15	December 26, 1987 – January 25, 1988 (11 losses, 4 ties)
Home	11	December 19, 1987 – January 25, 1988 (7 losses, 4 ties); February 11, 2012 – March 29, 2012 (8 losses, 1 OT loss, 2 SO losses)
Away	18	October 6, 1982 – January 5, 1983 (13 losses, 5 ties)
Consecutive playoff appearances
15		1931 – 1945

== Individual records ==
=== Career leaders ===
	All-time leader		Active leader^{‡}	
Games	1188	George Armstrong	964	Morgan Rielly
Points	987	Mats Sundin	799	Auston Matthews
Points (defenceman)	768	Borje Salming	558	Morgan Rielly
Goals	437	Auston Matthews	437	Auston Matthews
Goals (defenceman)	148	Borje Salming	98	Morgan Rielly
Powerplay goals	124	Mats Sundin	112	Auston Matthews
Shorthanded goals	31	David Keon	3	William Nylander
Shorthanded points	45	David Keon	6	Morgan Rielly
Game winning goals	79	Mats Sundin	68	Auston Matthews
Overtime goals	16	William Nylander	16	William Nylander
Empty net goals	18	Auston Matthews	18	Auston Matthews
Hat tricks	18	Darryl Sittler	14	Auston Matthews
Assists	620	Borje Salming	460	Morgan Rielly
Assists (defenceman)	620	Borje Salming	460	Morgan Rielly
Plus/minus	+151	Tim Horton	+154	Auston Matthews
Penalty minutes	2,265	Tie Domi	289	Max Domi
Goaltender games played	629	Turk Broda	65	Anthony Stolarz
Goaltender minutes	38,167	Turk Broda	3,676	Anthony Stolarz
Goaltender wins	302	Turk Broda	35	Anthony Stolarz
Shutouts	62	Turk Broda	4	Anthony Stolarz
Goals against average^{†}	2.06	Al Rollins	2.63	Anthony Stolarz
Save percentage^{††}	0.925	Curtis McElhinney	0.911	Anthony Stolarz
Goaltender assists	16	Mike Palmateer	3	Anthony Stolarz

- ‡ Currently playing for Toronto as of 2026–27
- † Minimum 50 games played
- †† Minimum 500 shots against

=== Single season leaders ===
	All-time leader	
Points	127	Doug Gilmour (1992–93)
Points (center)	127	Doug Gilmour (1992–93)
Points (right wing)	102	Mitch Marner (2024–25)
Points (left wing)	99	Dave Andreychuk (1993–94)
Points (defenceman)	79	Ian Turnbull (1976–77)
Points (rookie)	69	Auston Matthews (2016–17)
Goals	69	Auston Matthews (2023–24)
Goals (centre)	69	Auston Matthews (2023–24)
Goals (right wing)	54	Rick Vaive (1981-82)
Goals (left wing)	53	Dave Andreychuk (1993–94)
Goals (defenceman)	22	Al Iafrate (1987–88); Ian Turnbull (1976-77)
Goals (rookie)	40	Auston Matthews (2016–17)
Power play goals	21	Dave Andreychuk (1993–94); Wendel Clark (1993–94)
Shorthanded goals	8	Dave Keon (1970–71); Dave Reid (1990–91)
Shorthanded goals (rookie)	4	Zach Hyman (2016–17)
Game winning goals	13	Charlie Conacher (1934-35)
Overtime goals	4	Mats Sundin (1999–2000)
Empty net goals	6	Zach Hyman (2018–2019)
Assists	95	Doug Gilmour (1992–93)
Assists (defenceman)	66	Borje Salming (1976–77)
Assists (rookie)	42	Mitch Marner (2016–17)
Assists (goaltender)	5	Mike Palmateer (1978–79); Ken Wregget (1987–88); Curtis Joseph (1998–99); Vesa Toskala (2007–08)
Plus/minus	+47	Ian Turnbull (1976–77)
Shots	348	Auston Matthews (2021–22)
Shot Blocks	189	Chris Tanev (2024-25)
Penalty minutes	365	Tie Domi (1997–98)
Penalty minutes (goaltender)	40	Ken Wregget (1987–88)
Goaltender games played	74	Felix Potvin (1996–97)
Goaltender minutes played	4271	Felix Potvin (1996–97)
Goaltender wins	38	Frederik Andersen (2017–18)
Goaltender losses	36	Felix Potvin (1996–97)
Goaltender shots against	2438	Felix Potvin (1996–97)
Shutouts	13	Harry Lumley (1953–54)
Saves	2214	Felix Potvin (1996–97)
Goals against average^{†}	1.52	Lorne Chabot (1928–29)
Save percentage^{††}	.944	Jacques Plante (1970–71)

- † Minimum 40% of team's games played
- †† Minimum 500 shots against; Save percentage was not recorded until the mid-1950s

=== Single game leaders ===
	All-time leader	
Points	10^{†}	Darryl Sittler, 6G-4A (February 7, 1976, W 11–4 vs. Boston Bruins)
Points (defenceman)	6	Walter "Babe" Pratt, 0G-6A (January 8, 1944, W 12–3 vs. Boston Bruins)
Points (rookie)	5	Howie Meeker, 5G-0A (January 8, 1947, W 10–4 vs. Chicago Blackhawks)
Points (single period)	5	Darryl Sittler, 3G-2A (February 7, 1976, W 11–4 vs. Boston Bruins, 2nd period)
Goals	6	Corb Denneny (January 26, 1921, W 10−3 vs. Hamilton Tigers); Darryl Sittler (February 7, 1976, W 11–4 vs. Boston Bruins)
Goals (defenceman)	5	Ian Turnbull February 2, 1977, W 9–1 vs. Detroit Red Wings)
Goals (rookie)	5	Howie Meeker (January 8, 1947, W 10–4 vs. Chicago Blackhawks)
Goals (first NHL game)	4^{†}	Auston Matthews, (October 10, 2016, L 5–4 (OT) vs. Ottawa Senators)
Goals (single period)	4^{‡}	Harvey "Busher" Jackson (November 20, 1934, W 5–2 vs. St. Louis Eagles, 3rd period)
Power play goals	3	Tie by 5 players Niklas Hagman (October 26, 2009 most recent)
Shorthanded goals	2	Tie by 14 players Darcy Tucker (March 6, 2000 most recent)
Assists	6	Babe Pratt (January 8, 1944, W 12−3 vs. Boston Bruins); Doug Gilmour (February 13, 1993, W 6–1 vs. Minnesota North Stars)
Assists (defenceman)	6^{‡}	Walter "Babe" Pratt (January 8, 1944, W 12–3 vs. Boston Bruins)
Assists (rookie)	4	Pat Boutette (February 25, 1976, W 8–0 vs. Detroit Red Wings); Dan Daoust (January 2, 1983, W 6–3 vs. Detroit Red Wings)
Assists (single period)	4	Rick Vaive (March 12, 1984, L 8-7 (OT) vs. Winnipeg Jets, 2nd period); Morgan Rielly (October 15, 2019, W 4-2 vs. Minnesota Wild, 2nd period)
Shots	15	Dave Andreychuk (March 23, 1993 vs. Winnipeg Jets) Auston Matthews (March 25, 2023 vs. Carolina Hurricanes||)
Penalty minutes	57	Brad Smith (November 15, 1986)
Goaltender shots against	65	Allan Bester (March 15, 1984)
Goaltender saves	60	Allan Bester (March 15, 1984)

=== Individual streaks ===
	All-time leader	
Consecutive games played	486	Tim Horton (February 11, 1961 – February 4, 1968)
Goaltender wins in consecutive games	11	Jack Campbell (January 16, 2021 – April 10, 2021) †(NHL record for winning streak to open a season)
Points in consecutive games	23	Mitch Marner (October 27, 2022 – December 13, 2022)
Points in consecutive home games	20	Mitch Marner (November 2, 2022 – January 20, 2023)
Goals in consecutive games	11	Babe Dye (January 17, 1921 – February 19, 1921); Babe Dye (January 14, 1922 – February 18, 1922)
Goals in consecutive road games	10	Auston Matthews (November 25, 2021 – January 15, 2022)
Assists in consecutive games	12	Norm Ullman (December 12, 1970 – January 6, 1971)
Assists in consecutive games (rookie)	6	Zach Hyman (2016–17); Bob Nevin (1960–61); Dan Daoust (1982–83); Frank Nigro (1982–83)

- † NHL record
- ‡ Tied with NHL record
