= Byars =

Byars may refer to:

- Byars (surname)
- Byars, Oklahoma, town, United States
