= Byars (surname) =

Byars is a surname. Notable people with the surname include:

- Angela Byars-Winston, American psychologist
- Betsy Byars (1928–2020), American author
- Billy Byars Jr. (born 1936), American film producer
- Billy Byars Sr. (1901–1965), American oilman, cattle rancher, and sportsman
- Bryan Byars (born 1991), American soccer player
- Chris Byars (born 1970), an American jazz saxophonist
- Dennis Byars (1940–2022), American politician
- Derrick Byars (born 1984), American basketball player and entrepreneur
- James Lee Byars (1932–1997), American conceptual artist and performance artist
- Keith Byars (born 1963), American sports broadcaster and former American football fullback
- Margaret Bell-Byars (born 1962), American gospel musician

== See also ==
- Byers (disambiguation)
- Buyers
