= Byers =

Byers may refer to:

== Places ==
- Byers, Colorado
- Byers, Kansas
- Byers, Texas
- Byers Peak in Grand County, Colorado
- Byers Peninsula, Antarctica
- Byers Station Historic District

== Names of people ==
- Byers (surname)

== See also ==
- Byars (disambiguation)
- Buyers
- Breyers
- Bryers, a surname
