= David Redden =

American auctioneer (1949–2024)

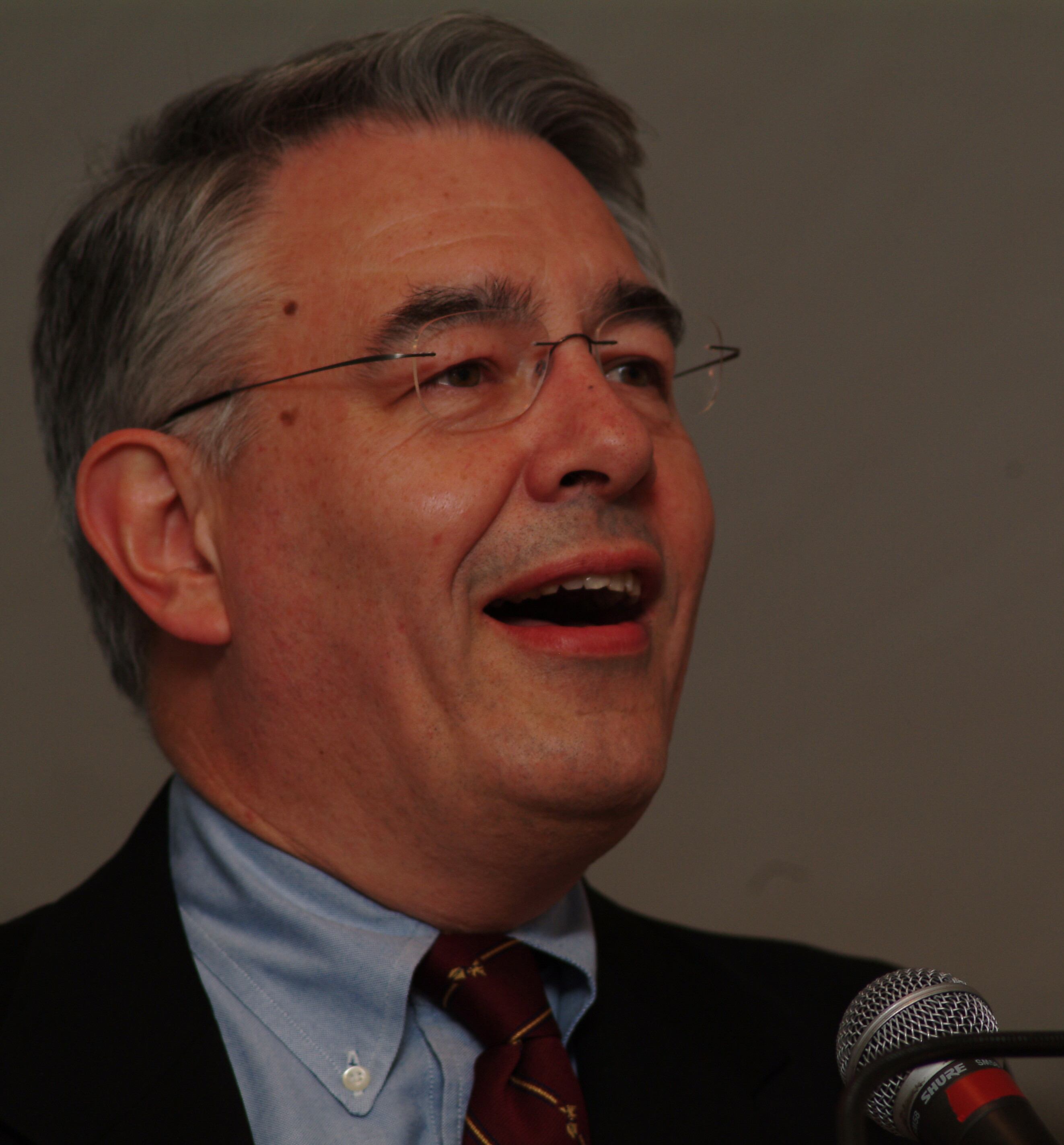
- Redden in 2003
- Born: David Normand Redden; January 23, 1949; Canton, China
- Died: May 11, 2024 (aged 75); Cornwall-on-Hudson, New York, U.S.
- Education: Wesleyan University
- Occupations: Auctioneer and philanthropist
- Known for: Auctioneer and Vice-Chairman of Sotheby's
- Board member of: Black Rock Forest; The Olana Partnership; American Trust for the British Library; Hudson Highlands Nature Museum; Scenic Hudson

David Normand Redden (January 23, 1949 – May 11, 2024) was an American auctioneer. He spent his entire career, from 1974 to 2016, with Sotheby's where he was a vice-chairman and was Sotheby's longest serving auctioneer. He has also chaired the boards of several American and British preservation and educational organizations.

== Early life ==
Redden was born on January 23, 1949, in Canton, China (now named Guangzhou), where his father served as an American consul for the US State Department. Nine months later he and his parents were withdrawn by the State Department as the Red Army advanced on Canton and transferred to Haifa, Israel. His father eventually became American consul general in London and Rome, where Redden spent much of his youth and education, receiving his high school diploma from St. Stephen's School in Rome. He later graduated from the Art History program at Wesleyan University, where he participated in anti-Vietnam War demonstrations.

== Auction career ==
Redden began his auction career as a catalog trainee at Sotheby's in 1974. He initially joined the company in order to learn more about his passion, collecting. By 1975 he was an auctioneer. Between his start at Sotheby's and the mid-1990s, Redden created numerous new auction categories for the company, including the specialty categories such as “space-memorabilia”, “baseball memorabilia, comic books, arcade machines, and computerized animation art.” Early in his career, in the late 1970s, he was appointed the director of PB-84, Sotheby's satellite auction house that focused on lower-priced items and unusual collecting categories. He later also became credited with developing the Internet strategy for Sotheby's in the late 1990s when he became chairman of Sothebys.com. Redden is best known as the manager and auctioneer for many of Sotheby's most celebrated live auctions. Redden served as a vice-chairman of Sotheby's from February 2000 to 2016, when he retired. He was also the Worldwide Chairman of Sotheby's Books and Manuscripts.

As an auctioneer Redden's sales included two first printings of the U.S. Declaration of Independence, the Collections of the Duke and Duchess of Windsor, the Empress Josephine's copy of Redoute's Les Liliacees containing the original watercolors, the Estate of Jacqueline Kennedy Onassis; a series of popular auctions for the Walt Disney Company; the largest, most complete, and best preserved Tyrannosaurus rex fossil ever recovered known as “Sue”; the most valuable coin ever sold, the 1933 Double Eagle; the Bay Psalm Book, the first book printed in America; the world's most valuable stamp, the British Guiana 1¢ Magenta; Albert Einstein's manuscript on Special Relativity, a Moon lander (still on the Moon), three returned space capsules, and the first sale of rocks brought back from the Moon; the manuscript of Magna Carta now in the National Archives; two of the greatest book sales of the 20th century, the library of H. Bradley Martin and the Garden Ltd. Collection; the Nelson Bunker Hunt sale of Ancient Coins, the Four Battleflags of the Revolution, the George Catlin Native American portraits collected in the 19th century by Benjamin O'Fallon, and the Bomberg Talmud from the Valmadonna Library. Several books have been written about his sales including Tyrannosaurus Sue by Steve Fiffer, Illegal Tender by David Tripp, and The One-Cent Magenta by James Barron.

Other notable auctions include: The Barry Halper Collection of Baseball Memorabilia, The Washington-Lafayette Cincinnati Medal, James Naismith's manuscript for The Rules of Basketball, The Guidon (flag) from the Battle of Little Bighorn, Robert Kennedy's copy of The Emancipation Proclamation signed by Lincoln, and Treasure from the SS Central America.

Privately, Redden sold Gilbert Stuart's Lansdowne Portrait of George Washington to the Smithsonian National Portrait Gallery, the papers of Martin Luther King Jr. to the city of Atlanta and the nine Forbes family Fabergé Imperial Easter Eggs. He was also involved in the discovery of the missing first half on the manuscript for Huckleberry Finn. Upon his retirement, Redden was the longest-serving auctioneer in Sotheby's history.

== Collusion scandal ==
In the 1990s Sotheby's and Christie's colluded on auction commissions and other business practices. Redden, who had no prior knowledge of the crime, was the first staff member at either Christie's or Sotheby's to speak out publicly decrying the criminal activities of the leadership of the two firms.

== Acting ==
Redden performed in the following films:

- Jane Austen in Manhattan
- Gossip Girl: Season 3, Episode 3 "The Lost Boy"
- A Late Quartet
- W.E.

== Boards and philanthropy ==
Redden has served as chairman of the following boards: Scenic Hudson, Black Rock Forest, which created the David Redden Conservation Science Fund that awards grants to scientists of all ages and supports lectures and seminars; The Olana Partnership, the Hudson Highlands Nature Museum, the American Trust for the British Library, and St. Stephen's School in Rome, Italy. He also served on the boards of the Hudson Highlands Land Trust, the Chelsea Square Conservancy, Friends of Hudson River Park, Madison Square Boys & Girls Club, and the Theater Institute at Storm King. While serving as Chairman of Scenic Hudson, he led $50 million in preservation efforts and land acquisitions. He and his wife have donated conservation easements over a portion of their Storm King Mountain property to the Hudson Highlands Land Trust. For many years he was a sought-after auctioneer for charity benefits.

== Amyotrophic lateral sclerosis ==
In 2017 Redden was diagnosed with amyotrophic lateral sclerosis. The physical decline has prevented Redden from completing the editing of his very extensive Private Diary of a Sotheby’s Auctioneer. In 2019 his family created the David Redden ALS Fund to benefit research and treatment of amyotrophic lateral sclerosis at Columbia University.

In October, 2022 Redden, now completely paralyzed by ALS, volunteered to be the subject of a long term experiment in mind control of machines. A stent packed with electrodes developed by Synchron Corporation was inserted into Redden´s brain in an eight hour operation involving twelve surgeons. A month later the stent was operational and training began. So far as of February 2024 there have been a hundred training sessions, resulting in Redden being able to control a computer through thought alone.

== Getty Acquires Redden Papers ==
In 2022, the J. Paul Getty Trust announced the acquisition of Redden´s auction related papers, including his Diary. They are under seal until 2034.

== Personal life and death ==
In 1978 Redden married Jeannette Andreasen, currently a Commissioner of the Palisades Interstate Park. They have two children, Stephen and Clare.

Redden died from complications of amyotrophic lateral sclerosis (ALS) in Cornwall-on-Hudson, New York, on May 11, 2024, at the age of 75. He was diagnosed nine years prior to his death.
