= Brian Wallach =

American advocate

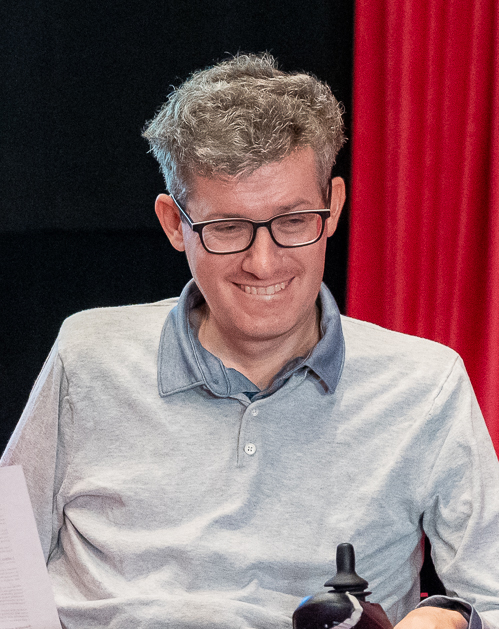
- Brian Wallach in 2024
- Born: October 9, 1980 (age 45)
- Education: Georgetown University (JD); Yale University
- Organization(s): I AM ALS, Synapticure
- Spouse: Sandra Abrevaya (m. 2013)
- Children: 2
- Website: https://iamals.org/

Brian Wallach (born October 9, 1980) is an American businessman, lawyer, and amyotrophic lateral sclerosis (ALS) research and patient advocate. He became known for his activism after being diagnosed with ALS in 2017. Since then, Wallach has founded a nonprofit, I AM ALS, and a telemedicine company, Synapticure.

== Education and career ==
=== Education ===
Wallach grew up in Washington, D.C., and attended Saint Albans School. He graduated from Yale University, where he participated in track and field. Wallach later received his J.D. from Georgetown University Law Center.

=== Career ===
After law school, Wallach worked on the first presidential campaign for Barack Obama, where he met his wife, Sandra Abrevaya. He joined the presidential campaign in 2007 as its deputy political director for the New Hampshire primary. After the campaign, he worked at a law firm before joining the White House counsel's office in 2011. From there, Wallach became a federal criminal prosecutor in the U.S. Attorney's Office in Chicago.

Wallach and his wife, Sandra Abrevaya, have co-founded two organizations focused on ALS. In 2019, they launched I AM ALS, a non-profit seeking to find a cure for ALS through funding and expanding access to research. In 2022 they founded Synapticure, a telemedicine company that provides care to those living with ALS, PLS, and Parkinson's.

== ALS diagnosis ==
Wallach was diagnosed with ALS in 2017 at the age of 37 on the same day he and his wife brought home their second daughter from the hospital. Originally visiting the doctor for a persistent cough, Wallach had also mentioned experiencing muscle tremors and weakness in his left hand and was told he probably had a progressive neurodegenerative disease. After his diagnosis, Wallach was given six months to live.

== Advocacy work ==
In January 2019, Wallach and Abrevaya launched I AM ALS. In April of the same year, Wallach testified before Congress, advocating for ALS patients and research funding while sharing "what it's like to live with a fatal diagnosis." Wallach argued that Congressional committees rarely heard from people diagnosed with ALS "because ALS is a relentless churn. We diagnose. We die, quickly. We don't have time to advocate."

Wallach's testimony spurred a legislative process that eventually led to President Joe Biden's December 2021 signing into law of the Accelerating Access to Critical Therapies for ALS Act, while acknowledging the contribution, and detailing the story, of Wallach and Abrevaya. This bill, which Wallach co-authored with others, provides expanded access to medications being studied in clinical trials to those who have been previously unable to participate. Also, this bill authorizes $100 million a year for five years to increase ALS research.

The ALS Disability Insurance Access Act was initially introduced in 2017 to shorten the five-month wait time for ALS patients to access disability benefits. A network of non-profits, including I AM ALS, advocated to move the bill forward, which the United States Senate passed in December 2020.

In June 2022, Wallach threw out the first pitch before a Chicago Cubs game at Wrigley Field as part of Lou Gehrig Day to raise awareness for ALS.

Wallach and Abrevaya were amongst those who testified at Congressional hearings advocating to have the Food and Drug Administration (FDA) approve the ALS drug sodium phenylbutyrate/ursodoxicoltaurine. A network of non-profits, including I AM ALS, submitted more than 50,000 signatures to the FDA calling for approval of the drug. In September 2022, the FDA approved it, making it the first new ALS drug in five years.

In December 2022, Dan Tate, an I AM ALS Board Member, delivered an I AM ALS petition calling for the FDA to hold an Advisory Committee meeting on the drug NurOwn. A July 2023 story by NPR described the work of Wallach and Abrevaya as having "changed the face of medical advocacy."

Wallach and Abrevaya spoke on the first day of the 2024 Democratic National Convention.

== Documentary ==
In 2019, Wallach and Abrevaya started working with filmmaker Chris Burke, Wallach's friend from Yale to create the documentary, No Ordinary Campaign. The film follows Wallach and Abrevaya as they travel across the US gathering information on the healthcare system's handling of rare and fatal diseases, and their work that led to increased federal funding, expanded access to therapies, and increased awareness of neurodegenerative diseases.

The documentary premiered in October 2022, at the Chicago International Film Festival, which featured a panel discussion with the film's executive producer, Katie Couric. The film received the festival's Audience Choice Award: Best Documentary.

For Love & Life: No Ordinary Campaign (updated title) became available for streaming on Prime Video on May 28, 2024.
