= Angela Byars-Winston =

American professor of internal medicine

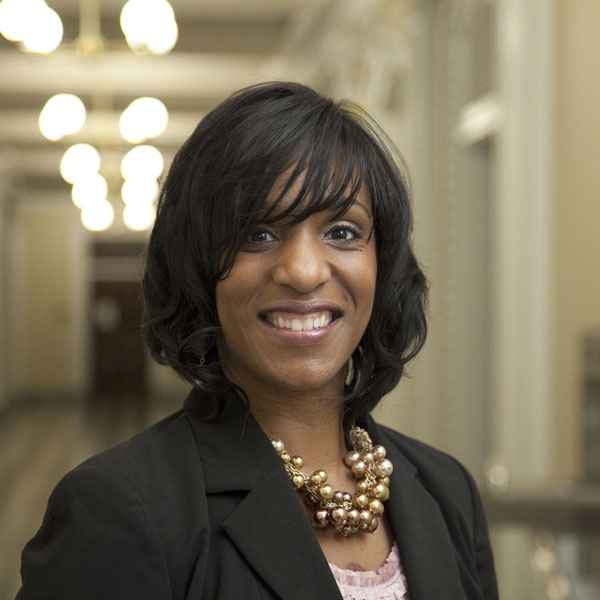
- Image of Byars-Winston at the White House
- Education: San Diego State University; Arizona State University; University of Maryland, College Park
- Awards: ACTS Clinical and Translational Research Distinguished Educator Award: Mentorship Innovation (2022) University of Wisconsin–Madison Outstanding Woman of Color Award (2014) Named United States' Champions of Change (2011)
- Scientific career
- Workplaces: University of Wisconsin–Madison

Angela Michelle Byars-Winston is a professor of Internal Medicine at the University of Wisconsin–Madison. She was the first African American to achieve the rank of tenured Full Professor of medicine at the University of Wisconsin–Madison. She studies the impact of culture on career development, in particular for women and minorities in STEM. She is a Fellow of the American Psychological Association and was one of Barack Obama's Champions of Change.

== Early life and education ==
Byars-Winston earned her bachelor's (1991) and master's (1992) degree at San Diego State University. She completed a predoctoral clinical fellowship at the University of Maryland, College Park. She attended graduate school at Arizona State University, specialising in counseling psychology. Her 1996 dissertation placed her on the national policy-making stage. She was one of only two black PhD students in the School of Education at Arizona State University in the fall of 1992.

== Career ==
Byars-Winston joined the University of Wisconsin–Madison as a KL2 scholar in 1997. She joined the School of Medicine in 2011 and became interested in whether people bring their identity to the foreground of their college experience. Byars-Winston and her colleagues, Christine Pfund and Janet Branchaw, were awarded a $1.4 million R01 National Institutes of Health (NIH) grant to investigate how mentors define diversity and developing ways to measure the impact of mentored research experiences on career outcomes. Byars-Winston is also part of a national team which was awarded $19 million from the NIH to organize a National Research Mentoring Network (NRMN). She has investigated how to measure mentoring interventions. She has also conducted a longitudinal study that monitored how the relationships between undergraduate mentees and their mentors in the biological sciences impact their academic outcomes.

One of the approaches to meet the skills gap in the United States is to engage African Americans, Latino/as, South East Asians, and Native Americans ('ALANA') with science and engineering subjects. Byars-Winston used social cognitive career theory to examine how ethnicity influenced academic self-efficacy and outcomes. She has identified several barriers to the progression of ALANA investigators, including the marginalization of interests, apartheid within academia and microaggressions. Byars-Winston demonstrated that race and ethnicity impact career expectations more than aspirations. She launched the Training and Education to Advance Minority Scholars in Science program (TEAM-Science) and Culturally Aware Mentoring (CAM) programs, which look to embed self-reflective dialogue about race and ethnicity in science. She is working with the National Academy to examine the effectiveness of programs that look engage individuals marginalized in STEM fields. In 2025, Byars-Winston co-chaired an ad hoc study group at the University of Wisconsin–Madison that released a report examining the experiences of Black students, faculty, and staff. She discussed the findings and institutional accountability in an episode of Black Like Me with Dr. Alex Gee on January 14, 2025.

Barack Obama named Byars-Winston as one of the United States' Champions of Change in 2011. The Presidency of Barack Obama established a Educate to Innovate campaign, which looked to improve the engagement of young people with science, technology, engineering and math (STEM). She is a member of the National Alliance for Partnerships in Equity STEM Equity Pipeline National Advisory Board and Wisconsin Career Development Association Executive Committee.

She won the University of Wisconsin–Madison Outstanding Woman of Color Award in 2014. In 2016 Byars-Winston was a visiting professor at Purdue University, where she ran a series of mentoring workshops. She published the Promising Practices for Strengthening the Regional STEM Workforce Development Ecosystem. In 2017 Byars-Winston became the first African American to achieve the rank of tenured Full Professor of medicine at the University of Wisconsin–Madison. She was elected to the National Academy of Sciences Board of Higher Education and Workforce (BHEW). In 2022, Byars-Winston won the ACTS (Association for Clinical and Translational Science) Clinical and Translational Research Distinguished Educator Award for Mentorship Innovation to acknowledge her dedication to mentoring researchers and improving the quality and inclusivity of clinical translational research.

In 2018, Byars-Winston received the John Holland Award for Outstanding Achievement in Career or Personality Research from the Society of Counseling Psychology.
