= Chris Bye =

Chris Bye may refer to:

- Chris Bye (musician), a member of the Great Gable band
- Chris Bye, a candidate in the 2022 United States House of Representatives election in Alaska
