= Börje Salming =

Swedish ice hockey player (1951–2022)

- Hockey Hall of Fame, 1996
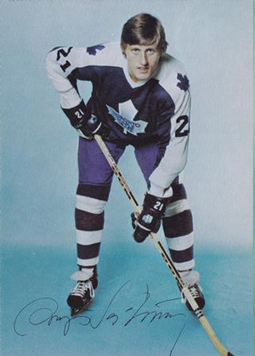
- Salming with the Toronto Maple Leafs in 1976
- Born: 17 April 1951 Salmi, Sweden
- Died: 24 November 2022 (aged 71) Nacka, Sweden
- Height: 6 ft 1 in (185 cm)
- Weight: 209 lb (95 kg; 14 st 13 lb)
- Position: Defence
- Shot: Left
- Played for: Brynäs IF; Toronto Maple Leafs; Detroit Red Wings; AIK Hockey
- National team: Sweden
- NHL draft: Undrafted
- Playing career: 1967–1993
Medal record
Representing Sweden
Men's ice hockey
World Championships
Silver medal – second place	1973 Soviet Union
Bronze medal – third place	1972 Czechoslovakia

Anders Börje Salming (Swedish: [ˈbœ̂rjɛ ˈsâlːmɪŋ]; 17 April 1951 – 24 November 2022) was a Swedish Sámi ice hockey player. He was a defenceman who played professionally for 23 seasons, for the clubs Brynäs IF, Toronto Maple Leafs, Detroit Red Wings, and AIK. He spent 16 seasons with the Maple Leafs, who retired his number 21 in 2016. Salming holds several Maple Leafs records, including the most assists.

Salming was one of the first European players to make an impact in the National Hockey League (NHL), for which he is often considered a trailblazer, being named to six consecutive NHL All-Star Teams, winning the NHL All-Star Games of 1976, 1977 and 1978, alongside being named a finalist for the James Norris Memorial Trophy on several occasions. In 1996, his first year of eligibility, Salming became the first European born and trained player inducted into the Hockey Hall of Fame. In 2017, the NHL named Salming one of the 100 Greatest Players in the first century of the league.

Salming played internationally for the Sweden men's national ice hockey team, winning silver and bronze medals at the Ice Hockey World Championships. He also played at three Canada Cups and the 1992 Winter Olympics. In recognition of his international career, Salming was inducted into the IIHF Hall of Fame in 1998, and named to the IIHF Centennial All-Star Team in 2008.

Salming was diagnosed with amyotrophic lateral sclerosis (ALS) in July 2022. He died on 24 November 2022, days after accepting an award in what his wife announced on his behalf would be the family's final public appearance.

== Early life ==
Salming was born on 17 April 1951 in the village of Salmi in what is now Kiruna Municipality, near Torneträsk in Jukkasjärvi Parish. His father, Erland (1921–1956), was of Sami origin, while his mother, Karin (née Persson, 1927–2022), was Swedish. His paternal grandfather Anders Nikolaus had the surname of Sarri, but changed it to Salming after the village that he and his father (Börje's great-grandfather) had built up. His father was a miner who died in a mining accident when Salming was 5 years old. Salming's older brother, and role model growing up, Stig Salming (b. 1947) also played hockey, for Brynäs IF between 1968 and 1981, becoming Swedish champions six times.

Salming identified himself as indigenous Sámi and was included in the electoral roll for Sametinget. He also shared his experiences growing up as indigenous in his native Kiruna and supported the struggle for Indigenous peoples' human rights on national TV. As a reflection of his Sámi heritage, Salming often wore a traditional Sami pewter bracelet.

The Salming family resided close to an ice skating hall called Matojärvi hall where Börje started skating at the age of 6. He also played handball during his childhood.

== Playing career ==
=== Swedish leagues ===
Salming played with Kiruna AIF in Sweden's Division 2 from 1967 to 1970 before joining Brynäs in the top division between 1970 and 1973. Brynäs won league championships in 1971 and 1972 with Salming on the squad. The team's success attracted attention from Toronto Maple Leafs scout Gerry McNamara, who was initially sent to investigate Inge Hammarström, but was more impressed by Salming after seeing him play. The Maple Leafs signed Salming as a free agent on 12 May 1973.

After leaving the National Hockey League (NHL) he completed his pro hockey career with AIK of the Swedish Elite League. One of the opponents he faced at AIK was young defenceman Nicklas Lidström, who credited Salming with encouraging his own career.

=== National Hockey League ===
Salming made his NHL debut with the Leafs at the beginning of the 1973–74 NHL season against the Buffalo Sabres. After a 7–4 victory, Salming was named the best player of the game. By the end of the season, Salming had recorded 39 points.

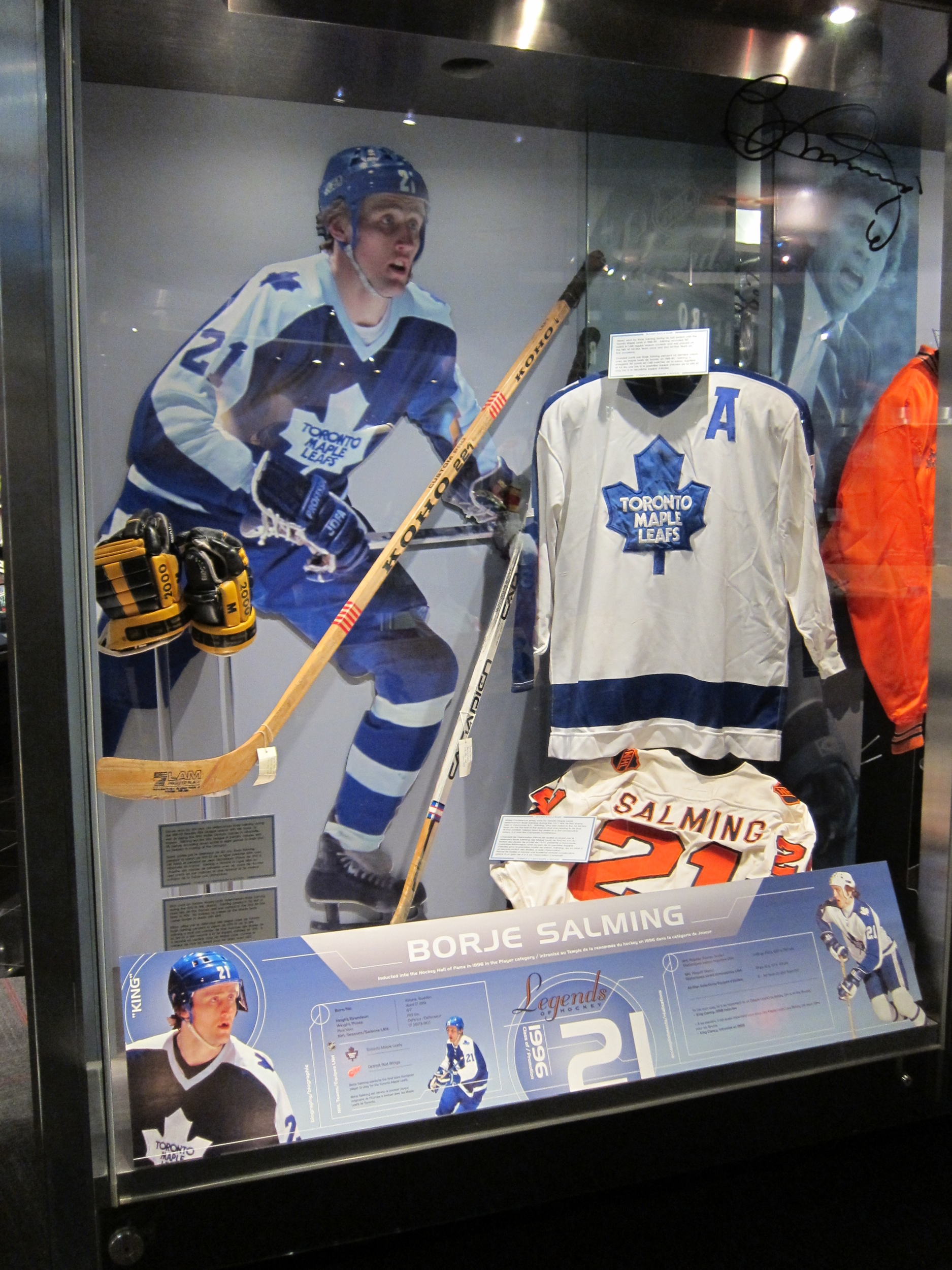
Salming's exhibit at the Hockey Hall of Fame

Prior to Salming's arrival in the NHL, most North Americans considered European players too soft to play in the NHL. North American ice hockey was played in a more physical style on a smaller rink, and hockey fights were common, while European ice hockey emphasised speed and skill on a larger ice surface. NHL sources even referred to players from Sweden as "Chicken Swedes." Salming's strong performances helped to permanently eradicate that reputation.

On 4 September 1986, Salming was suspended by the NHL for eight regular season games and fined $500, because he was quoted in a Toronto newspaper in May saying that he used cocaine "five, six years ago, but not since and I feel good about saying no." The league initially suspended him for the entire season, then commuted the suspension. On 26 November 1986, late in a game between the Leafs and the Red Wings in Detroit, Salming was knocked down in front of the Leafs net and Gerard Gallant of the Red Wings accidentally cut Salming's face with his skate blade. The injury required facial cosmetic surgery that involved more than 200 stitches.

On 4 January 1988, Salming became the first European born and trained player to appear in 1,000 career NHL games. In recognition of his achievement, on 27 January (in Salming's 1,011th game), he was gifted a car driven onto the ice by his parents and friend Inge Hammarström in a surprise pre-game ceremony, inspired by a similar ceremony given by the Philadelphia Flyers to Bill Barber.

In 1989, after 16 years with the Toronto Maple Leafs, he signed as a free agent with the Red Wings, for whom he played one season to finish his career in the NHL.

In the NHL, he played 1148 regular season games (1099 of them with the Leafs) and 81 playoff games, scoring totals of 150 goals and 637 assists. Salming was named a First Team All-Star in 1977, and was selected to the Second Team in 1975, 1976, 1978, 1979, and 1980. Salming spent 16 seasons with the Maple Leafs, recording 768 points (148 goals, 620 assists). The other Toronto players nicknamed him 'The King'.

=== International play ===
Salming had an extensive international playing career. He played for the Swedish national team at the 1972 and 1973 World Championships, winning a silver and bronze medal, respectively. He also played at the Canada Cup in 1976, 1981, and 1984; and the 1992 Winter Olympics. The 1976 Canada Cup was held at Maple Leaf Gardens. Sweden faced Team USA in Toronto, and Salming received a standing ovation. Salming later commented, "I'll never forget our game in Toronto. The fans gave me a standing ovation during the introductions. I was representing my country and Canadian fans gave me a standing ovation. Sometimes hockey has no country." In recognition of his international career, Salming was named to the IIHF Centennial All-Star Team in 2008, one of five players honoured.

== Retirement ==
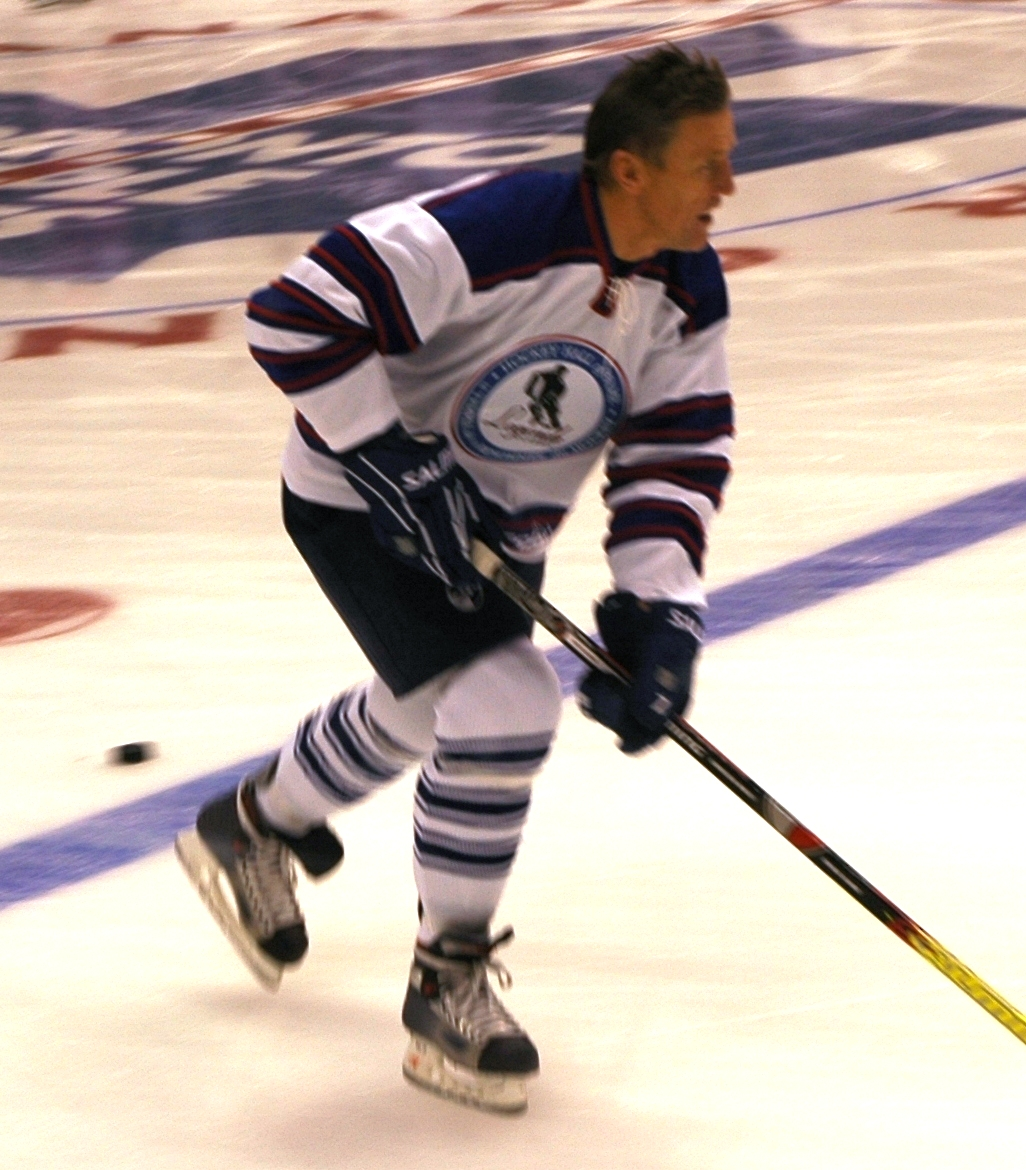
Salming in 2008

After the end of his playing career, Salming launched an eponymous brand of sports underwear. In 2007, at age 56, he posed nude for 31 paintings by Swedish graffiti artist Johan Wattberg. Ten of the paintings were displayed in Sweden, with the remaining 21 (matching his jersey number) displayed in Toronto.

== Personal life ==
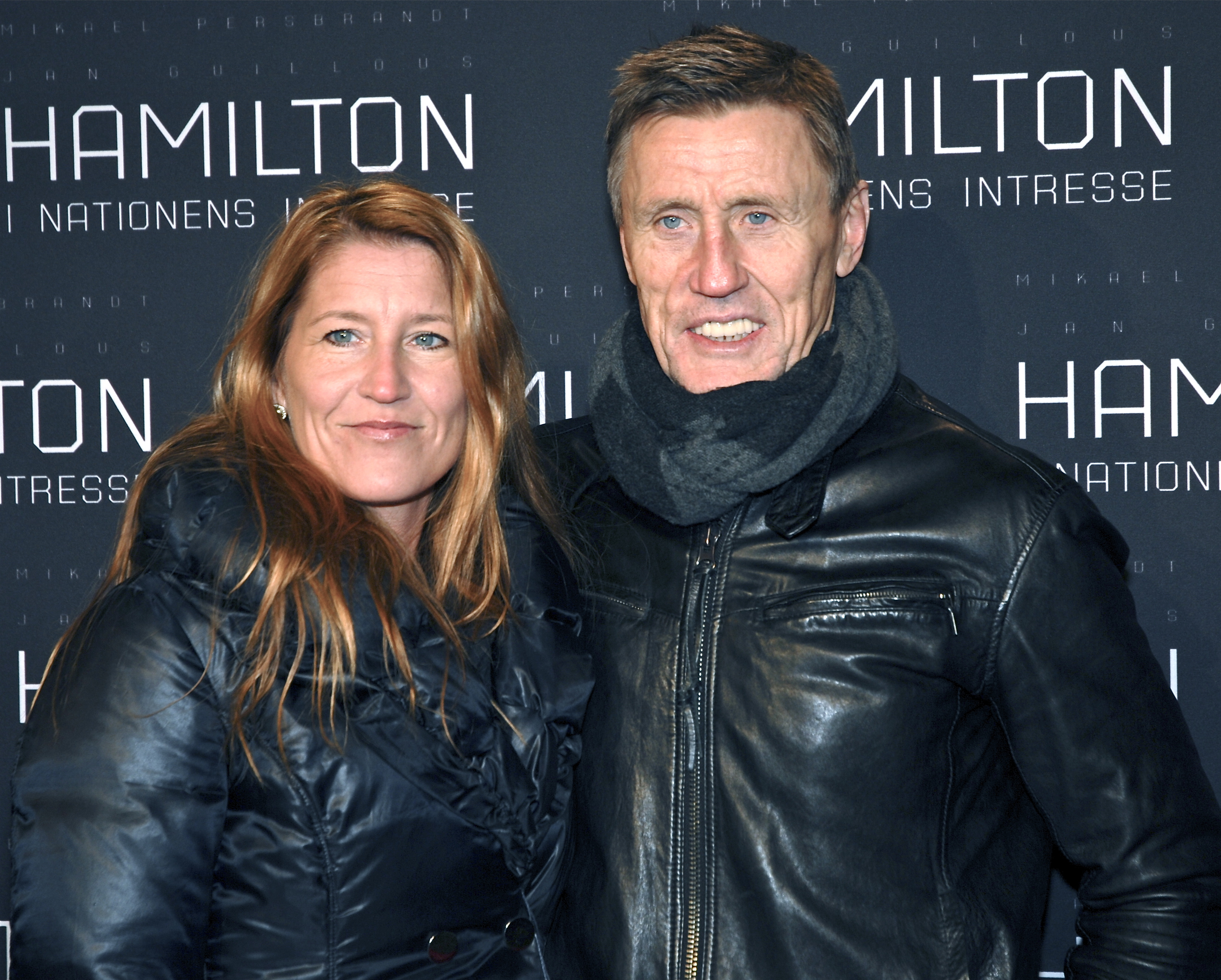
Salming in 2012, with his future wife, Pia

Early in his career as a Leaf, Salming resided in the High Park neighbourhood in Toronto with his wife Margitta, a children's-wear designer; they later divorced.

In 2016, he married Pia Salming. Salming had four children: Theresa and Anders with first wife Margitta, and Rasmus and Bianca with his ex-partner Katarina. His daughter Bianca Salming is a heptathlete.

== ALS diagnosis and death ==
In February 2022, Salming began to experience an unusual twitching motion in his muscles, which later forced him to prematurely exit an alumni game in March. In mid-July, Salming was diagnosed with amyotrophic lateral sclerosis, commonly known as ALS or Lou Gehrig's Disease. On 10 August, Salming publicly revealed his diagnosis via a statement shared through the Toronto Maple Leafs organization. Following his diagnosis, Salming developed severe depression. Appearing in public on 17 October, for the first time since his diagnosis, Salming revealed that his condition had worsened: he had lost the ability to speak, requiring him to use a tablet computer for communication, and required a feeding tube for meals.

On 11 November 2022, despite his diagnosis, Salming made the annual trip to Toronto for the Maple Leafs' Hall of Fame induction weekend game, where he was part of an emotional pre-game moment where lifelong friend Darryl Sittler helped Salming wave to the crowd. The following night, the Maple Leafs honoured Salming in their game against the Vancouver Canucks, featuring a pre-game ceremony dedicated to the defender where a tearful Salming dropped the puck in the ceremonial face off, with Toronto's William Nylander and Vancouver's Oliver Ekman-Larsson receiving the faceoff, both Swedes. The Maple Leafs selected a unique starting line-up of six Swedish players to honour Salming's career.

The following week, on 17 November 2022, Salming was elected to the all-star team of the century and was awarded the NHL's Honorary Award at a ceremony in Sweden. Following the ceremony, Salming's wife announced that the event would be the family's final appearance.

One week later, on 24 November 2022, Salming died at the age of 71. His death made national headlines in Canada and in Sweden, with several organizations, athletes, and celebrities offering tributes to his life. For the remainder of the 2022–23 NHL season, the Maple Leafs wore commemorative shoulder patches in Salming's honour, with the team also making several donations to ALS research. On 30 November 2022, a moment of silence was held at Scotiabank Arena to honour him during a game where the San Jose Sharks visited the Toronto Maple Leafs. A private funeral was held at Skogskyrkogården on 20 December 2022. Three days earlier, his mother Karin had died aged 95.

== Legacy ==
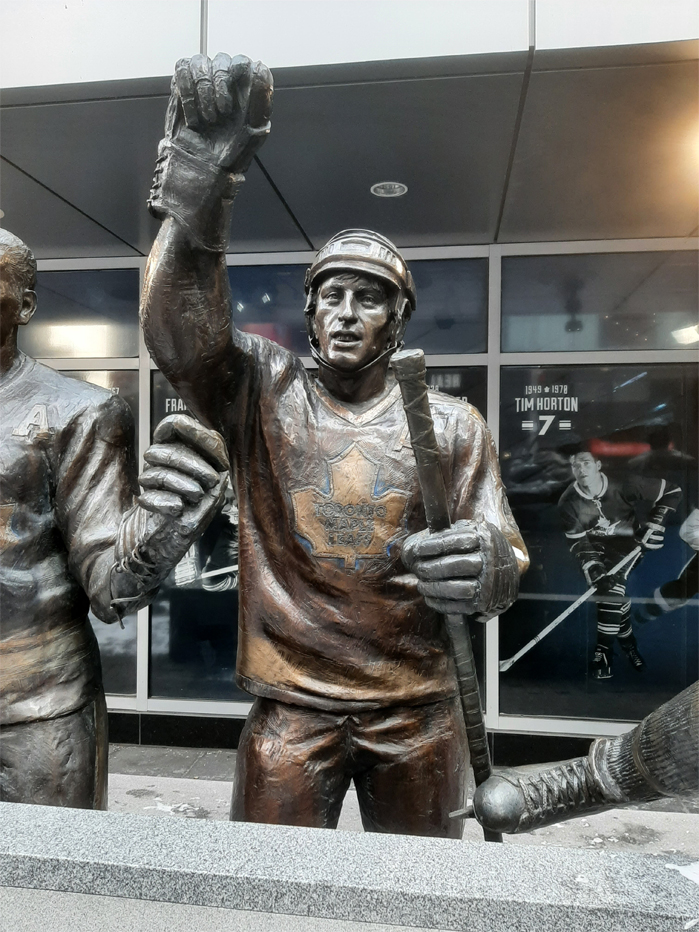
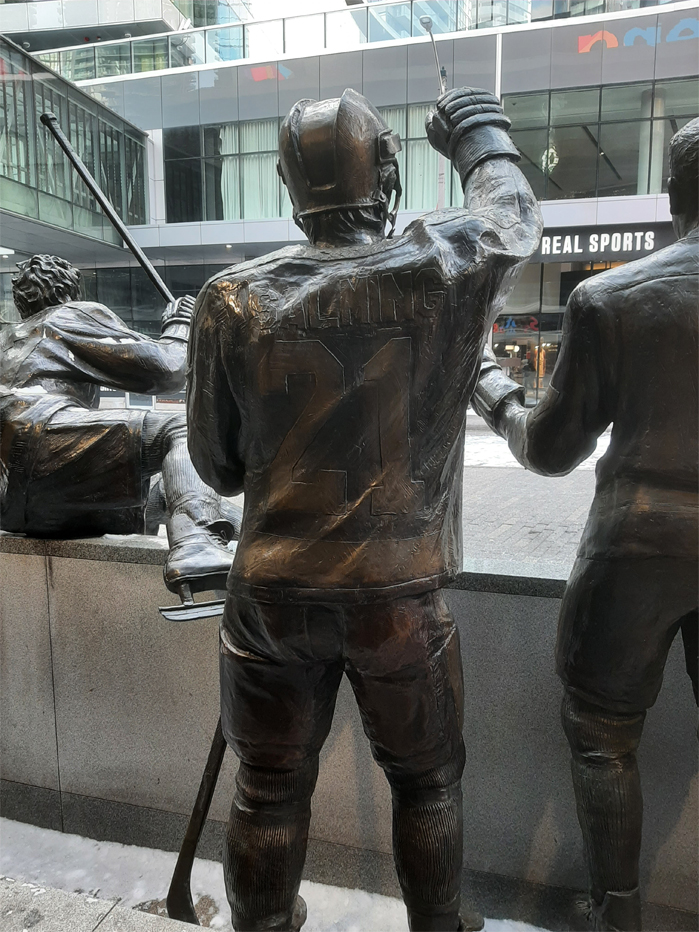
Salming is immortalized with a statue at Legends Row in front of Scotiabank Arena

One year after his death, the Börje Salming Courage Award was established, which is given to the European NHL alumnus who has been a positive influence in their community and best embodies Salming's legacy. Nicklas Lidström, who had considered Salming to be his personal hero, was awarded the inaugural trophy on 16 November 2023.

His death, along with the death of Chris Snow, the Calgary Flames assistant general manager, inspired all seven Canadian NHL teams to collectively fight ALS through the ALS Super Fund.

=== Börje Salming ALS Foundation ===
Two months before his death, the Börje Salming ALS Foundation was established by Salming and his family to advance medical scientific research to increase understanding and improve the treatment of amyotrophic lateral sclerosis (ALS). Each spring, the foundation hosts the "A Night for Börje" gala in collaboration with and hosted with Berns, an iconic venue in Stockholm.

== Honours and awards ==
In November 1996, Salming became the first Swedish player to be inducted into the Hockey Hall of Fame. In 2017, the NHL itself named Salming one of the '100 Greatest Players' in league history.

On 4 October 2006, Salming's no. 21 was honoured by the Leafs in a ceremony, along with Red Kelly's and Hap Day's no. 4, before their first game of the 2006–07 season. On 15 October 2016, to mark the centennial season of the Maple Leafs organization, Salming's number 21 was formally retired in a pre-game ceremony alongside other franchise greats who received the same honour for their respective numbers.

- Named to the All-Star Team at the World Ice Hockey Championships in 1973.
- Named to the Swedish All-Star Team in 1973 and 1989.
- Named to the NHL First All-Star Team in 1977.
- Named to the NHL Second All-Star Team in 1975, 1976, 1978, 1979 and 1980.
- Named to the Canada Cup All-Star Team in 1976.
- Named to the IIHF Centennial All-Star Team in 2008.
- Named to the Swedish All-Star Team of the Century in 2022.
- Awarded the Viking Award (Best Swede in North America) in 1976, 1977 and 1979.
- Awarded the Molson Cup (Most 3 Star Selections) in 1974, 1977, 1978 and 1980.
- Awarded the Charlie Conacher Humanitarian Award in 1982.
- Awarded the NHL Honorary Award in 2022.
- Played in and won the NHL All-Star Games of 1976, 1977 and 1978.
- James Norris Memorial Trophy runner-up twice, finished top 5 in voting 7 times.
- Inducted into the IIHF Hall of Fame in 1998.
- Number (21) Retired by the Toronto Maple Leafs
- '100 Greatest Players' in NHL history
- Swedish Ice Hockey Association All-Century Team

== Records ==
- Salming holds six career and single season Toronto Maple Leaf records including most career points by a defenceman, most career goals by a defenceman, most career assists (any position), most assists in a season by a defenceman, and best career plus-minus.
- First Swedish player (and the second European player, after Vladislav Tretiak) to be inducted into the Hockey Hall of Fame.

== Career statistics ==
=== Regular season and playoffs ===
			Regular season					Playoffs
Season	Team	League	GP	G	A	Pts	PIM	GP	G	A	Pts	PIM
1967–68	Kiruna AIF	SWE II	8	—	—	—	—	—	—	—	—	—
1968–69	Kiruna AIF	SWE II	13	—	—	—	—	—	—	—	—	—
1969–70	Kiruna AIF	SWE II	16	5	—	5	—	—	—	—	—	—
1970–71	Brynäs IF	SWE	14	0	5	5	6	13	2	1	3	16
1971–72	Brynäs IF	SWE	14	1	1	2	20	14	0	4	4	30
1972–73	Brynäs IF	SWE	14	2	3	5	20	12	3	1	4	24
1973–74	Toronto Maple Leafs	NHL	76	5	34	39	48	4	0	1	1	4
1974–75	Toronto Maple Leafs	NHL	60	12	25	37	34	7	0	4	4	6
1975–76	Toronto Maple Leafs	NHL	78	16	41	57	70	10	3	4	7	9
1976–77	Toronto Maple Leafs	NHL	76	12	66	78	46	9	3	6	9	6
1977–78	Toronto Maple Leafs	NHL	80	16	60	76	70	6	2	2	4	6
1978–79	Toronto Maple Leafs	NHL	78	17	56	73	76	6	0	1	1	8
1979–80	Toronto Maple Leafs	NHL	74	19	52	71	94	3	1	1	2	2
1980–81	Toronto Maple Leafs	NHL	72	5	61	66	154	3	0	2	2	4
1981–82	Toronto Maple Leafs	NHL	69	12	44	56	170	—	—	—	—	—
1982–83	Toronto Maple Leafs	NHL	69	7	38	45	104	4	1	4	5	10
1983–84	Toronto Maple Leafs	NHL	68	5	38	43	92	—	—	—	—	—
1984–85	Toronto Maple Leafs	NHL	73	6	33	39	76	—	—	—	—	—
1985–86	Toronto Maple Leafs	NHL	41	7	15	22	48	10	1	6	7	14
1986–87	Toronto Maple Leafs	NHL	56	4	16	20	42	13	0	3	3	14
1987–88	Toronto Maple Leafs	NHL	66	2	24	26	82	6	1	3	4	8
1988–89	Toronto Maple Leafs	NHL	63	3	17	20	86	—	—	—	—	—
1989–90	Detroit Red Wings	NHL	49	2	17	19	52	—	—	—	—	—
1990–91	AIK IF	SEL	36	4	9	13	46	—	—	—	—	—
1991–92	AIK IF	SEL	38	6	14	20	98	3	0	2	2	6
1992–93	AIK IF	SEL	6	1	0	1	10	—	—	—	—	—
SWE totals			42	3	9	12	46	39	5	6	11	70
NHL totals			1,148	150	637	787	1,344	81	12	37	49	91
SEL totals			80	11	23	34	154	3	0	2	2	6

=== International ===
Year	Team	Event	GP	G	A	Pts	PIM
1968	Sweden	EJC	5	1	0	1	4
1969	Sweden	EJC	5	0	0	0	8
1972	Sweden	WC	4	0	0	0	6
1973	Sweden	WC	10	4	6	10	4
1976	Sweden	CC	5	4	3	7	2
1981	Sweden	CC	5	0	2	2	10
1989	Sweden	WC	8	1	1	2	8
1991	Sweden	CC	6	0	0	0	10
1992	Sweden	OG	8	4	3	7	4
Junior totals			10	1	0	1	12
Senior totals			46	13	15	28	48
