= Chris Snow =

Canadian ice hockey executive (1981–2023)

- Born: August 11, 1981
- Died: September 30, 2023 (aged 42); Calgary, Alberta, Canada
- Spouse: Kelsie Snow (m. 2007)

Christopher Michael Snow (August 11, 1981 – September 30, 2023) was a Canadian ice hockey executive. He was the assistant general manager of the Calgary Flames.

== Personal life and death ==
Snow was born on August 11, 1981, and he grew up in Melrose, Massachusetts. He met his wife, Kelsie, when they were sportswriters for The Boston Globe. They married in 2007 and had two children. In 2019, Snow was diagnosed with amyotrophic lateral sclerosis (ALS). He died of complications of the disease in Calgary, Alberta, on September 30, 2023, at the age of 42. His death, along with Borje Salming a year earlier from the same fatal illness, caused all seven NHL Canadian teams to team up to fight ALS through the ALS Super Fund.
