= Tom Byer =

American soccer player (born 1960)

Personal information
- Full name: Thomas Byer
- Date of birth: November 21, 1960 (age 65)
- Place of birth: New York, United States

Youth career
- Rondout Valley Ganders
- SUNY Ulster
- USF Bulls

Senior career*
Years	Team	Apps	(Gls)
1981	Leiston	0	(0)
1986–1987	Hitachi		
- * Club domestic league appearances and goals

Tom Byer (born 21 November 1960) is a former professional soccer player, originally from New York state but now based in Tokyo.

== Early life and career ==
Byer started his soccer career at Rondout Valley High School where he was named Mid-Hudson Player of the Year and led the team to two league championships. He continued to play soccer at SUNY Ulster while studying for his associate degree in Liberal Arts - Humanities and Social Sciences in 1982.

Byer later played for the University of South Florida and was a member of the U.S. Olympic Sports Festival. Upon graduation, Byer trained with the Tampa Bay Rowdies franchise, but the NASL was in decline and the league folded soon after.

Byer then undertook a brief stint with Leiston in England before becoming the first American to play soccer in Asia by signing for Hitachi SC (currently named Kashiwa Reysol, playing in the J-League).

== Youth coaching ==
=== Nestlé Soccer Clinic Program and Kix International ===
In 1989, upon retiring from his professional soccer career, Byer started the Japanese Company, Kix International – an organization focused on youth football training. He would later pitch the idea of a National Clinic Program designed for the U12 Age Group to Nestle Japan. Tom, together with Steve Harris agreed with Nestle to organize 50 events in the first year sponsored by the Milo Brand. The Youth Clinic Program ran for 10 years.

=== Coerver Coaching Asia ===
In 1993 Byer introduced the Coerver Coaching Program to an Investor at Fuji Project. He travelled throughout Asia conducting clinics for National Football Federations to help improve and encourage youth development. Throughout his leadership tenure in Coerver Coaching, Byer established more than 60 schools in Japan.

=== T3 ===
At the end of 2007 Byer left Coerver Coaching Asia, and shortly after he started his own T3 academy. T3 focuses on not just training clinics, but also developing multi media platforms for the delivery of specific programs and curriculums for youth development across the entire Asian region. In July 2012, Football Association of Indonesia announced a partnership with T3 to assist with their bid for the 2017 FIFA Under-17 World Cup. More recently, in August 2012, the Chinese Football Association announced the appointment of Tom Byer as the Head Technical Advisor for the Chinese School Football Program Office and Official CFA Grassroots Ambassador. Tom's latest expansion is the opening of T3 Soccer Academy in Indonesia in October 2013.

== Television and media ==
For much of his time in Japan, Byer has been featured in a number of high-profile media programs. From 1998, Byer starred in Japan's Number One Children's TV Program, Oha Suta, presenting the "Tomsan's Soccer Technics" Corner on TV Tokyo's morning Show, for 13 years.

=== DVD and VHS ===
In 1999, Byer appeared in the VHS Video Series, "Tomsan's Soccer Technics, Part 1 and Part 2. This was produced by TV Tokyo, Shopro, JVC. In 2009 and 2010, Byer released "Tomsan's 1v1 Technics" and "Tomsan's Coaching A to Z" DVDs.

== Awards ==
Over the past 20 years, Byer has been conducting events in more than 2,000 locations with a total of 500,000 children participating. To culminate his achievement, Adidas honored Byer with the Golden Boot award, which he accepted in France after the World Cup draw of 1998 for his contribution to youth soccer in Asia. Byer remains the only youth coach to have received this award. In 2012, the AFF football blog named Byer as one of the top 10 influential foreign footballers in Japan.
