= Antony W. Diamond =

Canadian ornithologist

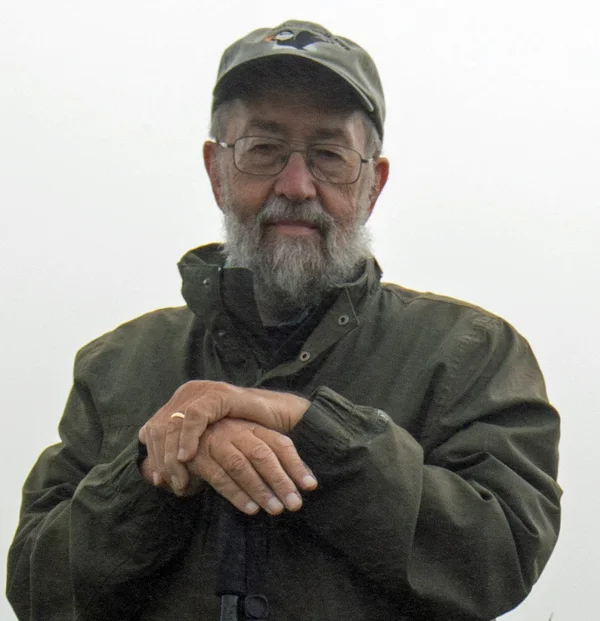
- Born: September 5, 1944 (age 81); Calcutta, British India
- Education: Queens' college, Cambridge.
- Occupations: Ornithologist, conservation manager, researcher, ecologist.
- Known for: Studies of seabirds in tropical and temperate seas
- Spouses: Elizabeth Pauline McIntyre (m. 1969; deceased 2002) Dorothy Mary Merchant (m. 2004)
- Children: Owen (1978); Peter (1981).
- Scientific career
- Workplaces: University of New Brunswick

Antony William "Tony" Diamond (born September 5, 1944 in Calcutta, India) is a British-Canadian ecologist, ornithologist and conservationist and Professor Emeritus of Wildlife Ecology at the University of New Brunswick (UNB). He is known for his work in seabird ecology, especially involving long-term studies on puffins, razorbills, and other marine birds in Atlantic Canada and maintains interests in forest and island bird ecology.

He founded and led first the Atlantic Cooperative Wildlife Ecology Research Network (ACWERN), with Canadian Wildlife Service, UNB, and Memorial and Acadia Universities, from 1994 to 2009. He is a past president of the Society of Canadian Ornithologists and the recipient of their Doris Huestis Speirs Award. In 2019 he received a Visionary Award from the Gulf of Maine Council on the Marine Environment,^{[6\https://gulfofmaine.org/public/wp-content/uploads/2019/07/2019-GOMC-Award-Winner-Bios.pdf} and in 2024 he received an Environmental Stewardship award from the Bay of Fundy Ecosystem Partnership.^{https://www.bofep.org/wpbofep/wp-content/uploads/2024/07/fundy-tidings-July-2024.pdf}

== Biography ==
He was born in Calcutta, India but grew up in southern England and Wales where he developed a passion for birdwatching and bird-ringing in childhood, beginning at the age of seven. He trained at British bird observatories during his youth, gaining early experience in avian fieldwork. He studied zoology at the University of Cambridge, where he earned his undergraduate degree, and subsequently completed his master’s and doctorate at the University of Aberdeen. His Ph.D. focused on the ecology of tropical seabirds of Aldabra Atoll in the Indian Ocean. where he participated in the Royal Society Expedition to Aldabara Atoll 1967-69.

== Career ==
Diamond went on to study West Indian bird ecology with David Lack at the Edward Grey Institute in Oxford (1970–72).

From 1973 to 1975, he worked as Scientific Administrator of Cousin Island Nature Reserve in the Seychelles, studying the endemic Seychelles Warbler, Hawksbill Turtle breeding biology, and writing the original management plan for the island as well as drafting legislation for its protection.

He went to the University of Nairobi, Kenya, as lecturer/senior lecturer in Zoology from 1976 to 1980, supervising graduate students on many projects including cheetah ecology, ostrich breeding biology, feeding behaviour of zebra, and African Fish Eagle biology, with his own research on honeyguide feeding ecology and African forest bird distribution.

Between 1981 and 1985, Diamond wrote Save the Birds for the International Council for Bird Preservation (now BirdLife International) under contract to a German publisher.

Diamond began his Canadian career in 1983, as a contract researcher for the Canadian Wildlife Service (CWS), contributing to projects including the four-volume Canadian Atlas of Bird Banding (1921–1995).

== Research ==
Diamond’s research has centered on the behavioral ecology, migration, breeding biology, and conservation of seabirds, from tropical species such as frigatebirds, terns, tropicbirds and boobies, to cold-water species particularly puffins, razorbills, storm-petrels.

A central focus of his recent work has been the long-term monitoring of seabird colonies on Machias Seal Island, a protected migratory bird sanctuary in the Bay of Fundy (and focus of some controversy because of disputed jurisdiction between Canada and the US, where he began studying in 1995.

Diamond’s research has revealed important insights into seabird phenology, breeding success, foraging behavior, and responses to changing ocean conditions. His work has documented significant shifts in the timing of egg-laying and chick-rearing among puffins and other species, correlating these changes with ocean temperatures, prey availability, and broader climate trends.

Early in his career, Diamond helped landbird conservation by laying the groundwork for translocation of Seychelles Warblers from Cousin Island to other islands in the archipelago, and in the 1980s he helped relocate puffin chicks from Great Island, Newfoundland, to islands off the coast of Maine.

== Personal life ==
In 2022 Diamond's first wife, archivist Elizabeth (McIntyre) Diamond, succumbed to breast cancer.

In 2026, he donated a portion of his land in Stanley, New Brunswick, to the Nature Trust of New Brunswick in order to establish a nature preserve there.
