= Gerasimos Michelis =

Greek actor (1966–2025)

Gerásimos Michelís (Greek: Γεράσιμος Μιχελής; March 4, 1966 – July 15, 2025) was a Greek actor, director and writer.

== Life and career ==
Michelis was born in Athens in 1966, to a father from Cephalonia and a mother from Astypalea. He grew up in Korydallos.

He studied acting at the Veaki Drama School, graduating in 1990, and singing and theory at the Conservatory of Piraeus. He attended vocal seminars and the Ancient Drama Workshop of Lefteris Voyatzis. His career was mainly associated with appearances in theatrical performances, produced by the NTNG. Michelis became known to the general public with his participation in the television series Sto Para 5.

In the last years of his life he was involved in writing books.

Michelis died in Athens on 15 July 2025, at the age of 59.
