= Ben Byer =

American dramatist

- Born: Benjamin Saul Byer; January 8, 1971
- Died: July 3, 2008 (aged 37); Cleveland, Ohio
- Cause of death: Amyotrophic lateral sclerosis
- Resting place: Shalom Memorial Park; Arlington Heights, Illinois
- Spouse: Josephine Christopher
- Children: 1

Ben Byer (January 8, 1971 – July 3, 2008) was an American stage actor and playwright. His experiences after being diagnosed with Amyotrophic lateral sclerosis (ALS) are documented in the 2007 film Indestructible.

== Biography ==
=== Early life and education ===
Benjamin Saul Byer was born January 8, 1971, to Barbara and Stephen Byer. One of five children, he graduated from Evanston Township High School. He studied journalism at Indiana University and film theory at the University of Paris.

=== Career ===
Byer began his career as a translator at the Cannes Film Festival, which led him to theatre and movie industry jobs in Los Angeles. He also worked in theatre in Chicago as a playwright and actor. He directed his first play, Take it Deep, in 2000.

After being diagnosed with Amyotrophic lateral sclerosis in 2002, he began documenting his life on camera. He spent the next three years keeping a video diary as he sought treatments in six countries, including having fetal cells injected directly into his brain in 2004. Although Byer did show improvements in his speech in the days following the procedure, the improvements did not last. Within the first month following the procedure, his previous ALS symptoms had returned. His footage was incorporated into film shot by Roko Belic to form the 2007 documentary film Indestructible film.

=== Marriage and children ===
Byer and his wife, Josephine Christopher, adopted a son, John Anthony Byer, shortly before his diagnosis with ALS.

=== Death and afterward ===
Byer died of ALS complications on July 3, 2008, in Cleveland, Ohio. He was interred at Shalom Memorial Park in Arlington Heights, Illinois.

== Awards ==
Ben Byer won the award of Best Documentary Film at the 2008 Byron Bay International Film Festival for the movie Indestructible. Top Ten documentaries of all time.

== Published works ==
- Take It Deep (play, 2000)
- Versailles (play, 2003)
