= Eunice Carter =

American prosecutor and pan-Africanist (1897–1970)

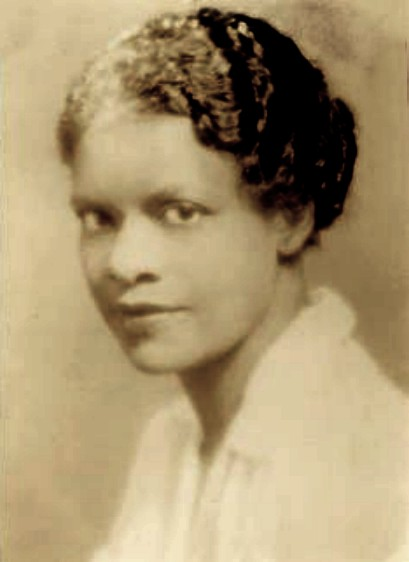
- Born: Eunice Roberta Hunton; July 16, 1897; Atlanta, Georgia, US
- Died: January 25, 1970 (aged 72); New York City, US
- Education: Smith College, 1921; Fordham Law School, 1932
- Occupations: Social worker; Lawyer
- Employer: Manhattan District Attorney
- Known for: Prosecution of mobster Charlie "Lucky" Luciano
- Political party: Republican
- Spouse: Lisle Carter Sr.
- Children: Lisle C. Carter
- Parents: William Alphaeus Hunton Sr. (father); Addie Waites Hunton (mother)
- Relatives: W. Alphaeus Hunton Jr. (brother); Stephen L. Carter (grandson)

Eunice Roberta Hunton Carter (July 16, 1897 – January 25, 1970) was an American lawyer. She was one of New York's first female African-American lawyers and one of the first African-American prosecutors in the United States. She was active in the Pan-African Congress and in United Nations committees to advance the status of women in the world. She led a massive prostitution racketeering investigation, building the case and strategy that allowed New York District Attorney Thomas Dewey to successfully charge Mafioso kingpin Charles "Lucky" Luciano with compulsory prostitution.

== Early life and education ==
Carter was born in Atlanta in 1897, the daughter of William Alphaeus Hunton Sr. (founder of the black division of the Y.M.C.A.) and Addie Waites Hunton (a social worker); both were college educated. Her paternal grandfather Stanton Hunton purchased his freedom from slavery before the American Civil War. Her brother, W. Alphaeus Hunton Jr., was an author, academic and activist noted for his involvement with the Council on African Affairs and promotion of Pan-African identity. The family moved from Atlanta to Brooklyn, New York, after the 1906 Atlanta race riot. They attended local schools. Their mother, Addie Hunton, was active with the NAACP and the YMCA, achieving national status. She was selected as one of two women to go to France during World War I to check on the condition of United States black servicemen.

Eunice graduated in four years from Smith College in Northampton, Massachusetts, receiving a bachelor's and at the same time, in 1921, a M.S.W. degree from the college's recently formed School for Social Work. After a brief time as a social worker, she decided to study law. In 1932, Carter became the first black woman to receive a law degree from Fordham University in New York City (Gray, 2007, n.p). In mid-May 1933, Eunice Carter passed the New York bar exam (Two New York Women, 6). Smith awarded her an honorary doctorate in law (L.L.D.) in 1938.

== Career ==
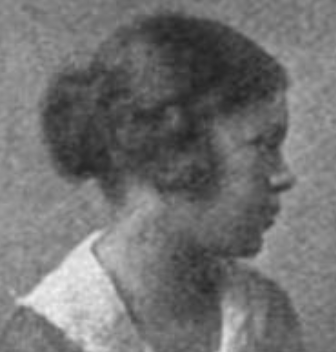
Eunice Hunton in 1921

Carter soon established a career in both law and international politics. In 1935 Carter became the first black woman assistant district attorney in the state of New York. As assistant DA, she determined that Mafia boss: Lucky Luciano must be involved in prostitution. Carter then put together a massive prostitution racketeering case that eventually implicated Luciano. She convinced Thomas Dewey, recently appointed special prosecutor for Manhattan by the governor, to personally prosecute the case. Luciano was convicted and served ten years, and then was deported. The conviction was described by Luciano biographer Tim Newark as, "a land-mark in legal history as it was the first against a major organized crime figure for anything other than tax evasion". The case generated national fame for Dewey, which he rode to election as the governor of New York. He also made two unsuccessful runs for the White House, one against President Harry S. Truman. Dewey benefited from Carter's prosecutorial skills and had genuine respect for her. She frequently accompanied him to political events in Harlem and elsewhere, and reporters noted that she offered him advice. ("Judge Paige", 6)

Active in the Pan-African Congress in the 1920s, Carter later became active in the United Nations, serving on committees that advocated improving the status of women ("Eunice Carter", 14). In addition to her work for the UN, she also served on the executive committee of the International Council of Women, an organization with representatives from 37 countries. ("U.S. Women's Unit", 9) Additionally, she served on the board of the Y.W.C.A. (Gray, 2007, n.p.)

== Marriage and family ==
Hunton married Lisle Carter Sr., who was one of the first African-American dentists in New York. They lived for many years in Harlem, Manhattan. The couple's only child, Lisle Carter Jr., graduated from college and law school. He practiced law and later worked in the John F. Kennedy and Lyndon B. Johnson presidential administrations as a political appointee. Lisle Carter Jr. had five children, one of whom is author and Yale Law professor Stephen L. Carter, who published a biography in 2018 about Eunice Carter entitled Invisible: The Forgotten Story of the Black Woman Lawyer Who Took Down America’s Most Powerful Mobster. In this biography of his paternal grandmother, Professor Carter includes "the possibility of a long-running affair with jazz musician Fletcher Henderson." The biography also notes the imprisonment of Eunice's brother W. Alphaeus Hunton Jr. for contempt of court, after refusing to answer questions about his knowledge of fugitive leaders of the Communist Party (for whose bail fund he had served as a signatory), and the consequent estrangement between the two siblings.

== See also ==
- List of people from Harlem

== Bibliography ==
- "Carter, Eunice Roberta Hunton: 1899 - 1970". wlh: Women's Legal History. Stanford Univ.
- Dawn Bradley Berry, The 50 Most Influential Women in American Law. Los Angeles: Contemporary Books (1996)
- Dorothy K. Hunton, Alphaeus Hunton: The Unsung Valiant. Self-published, New York, 1986 (life of W. A. Hunton Jr.)
- "Eunice Carter To Be Abroad Seven Weeks". The Chicago Defender. March 14, 1956, p. 14
- Gray, Madison (January 12, 2007). "Eunice Hunton Carter: Mob Buster". Time. Black History Month 2007
- Jean Blackwell Hutson, "Carter, Eunice Hunton", in Barbara Sicherman & Carol Hurd Green (eds.), Notable American Women: The Modern Period: A Biographical Dictionary. Cambridge: Belknap Press of Harvard Univ. Press (1980), pp. 141–142
- Jessie Carney Smith (Editor), Notable Black American Women. Detroit : Gale Research (1992)
- "Judge Paige, Miss Carter on Up Grade". The Chicago Defender. November 13, 1937, p. 6
- Marilyn S. Greenwald & Yun Li, Eunice Hunton Carter: A Lifelong Fight for Social Justice, Fordham Univ. Press (Empire State Editions), New York. 2021. ISBN 9780823293735 "Eunice Carter biography". Archived from the original on January 17, 2022.
- Stephen L. Carter, Invisible: The Forgotten Story of the Black Woman Lawyer Who Took Down America's Most Powerful Mobster. Henry Holt & Co., New York. 2018. ISBN 1250121973
- "Two New York Women Pass Bar Examinations". The Chicago Defender. May 20, 1933, p. 6
- "U.S. Women's Unit at Vienna Parley". The New York Times. May 7, 1959, p. 9
