= Stephen L. Carter =

American legal academic and writer

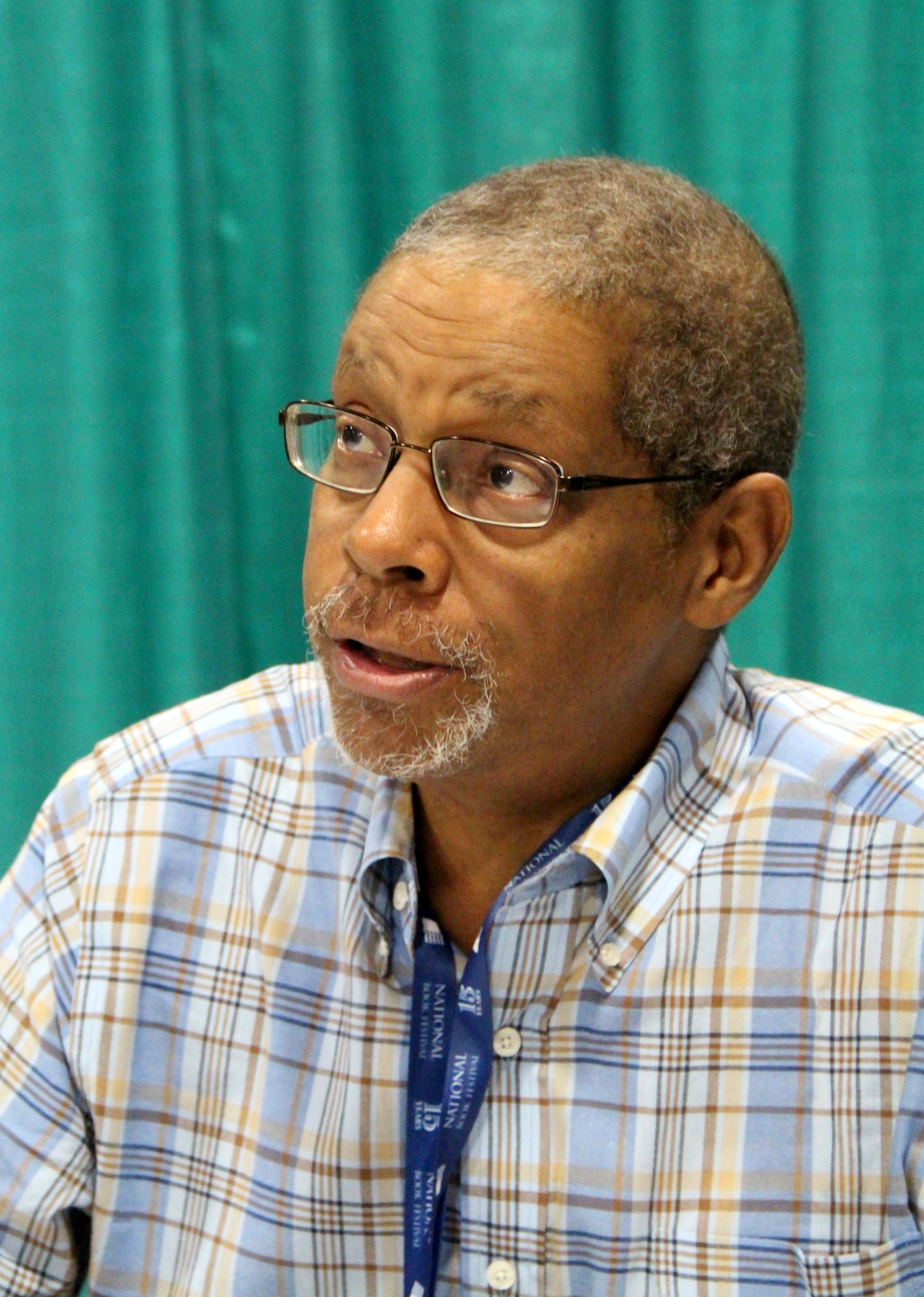
- Carter at the 2015 National Book Festival
- Born: Stephen Lisle Carter; October 26, 1954 (age 71); Washington, D.C., U.S.
- Education: Stanford University (BA); Yale University (JD)
- Occupations: Law professor; author
- Known for: Novels and social commentary
- Parent(s): Lisle Carter Jr; Emily Elizabeth Howze
- Relatives: Eunice Hunton Carter (grandmother); W. Alphaeus Hunton, Jr., great uncle

Stephen Lisle Carter (born October 26, 1954) is an American legal scholar who is the William Nelson Cromwell Professor of Law at Yale Law School. He writes on legal and social issues.

== Early life and education ==
Carter was born in Washington, D.C., the second of his parents' five children. He was raised in a family committed to public service. His mother worked as an executive assistant for Julian Bond and M. Carl Holman of the National Urban Coalition. An attorney turned administrator, his father was executive director of the Washington Urban League, and later a vice president at Cornell University. Carter's grandfather was a successful dentist in Harlem and his grandmother, Eunice Hunton Carter, was the first black woman to be a district attorney in New York state. His great-grandmother was the suffragist and activist Addie Waites Hunton.

Carter graduated from Ithaca High School in 1972, and his essay "The Best Black" is based in part on his experiences there. At Ithaca High School, he was the editor-in-chief of The Tattler, and pushed hard for student representation on the local school board.

Carter earned his B.A. in history from Stanford University in 1976. At Stanford he served as managing editor for The Stanford Daily. Carter received a J.D. from Yale Law School in 1979. At Yale, he won the prize for best oralist in the Thurmond Arnold Moot Court Competition and served as a note editor on the Yale Law Journal.

== Legal career ==
Following graduation from Yale, Carter served as a law clerk for Judge Spottswood W. Robinson III of the United States Court of Appeals for the District of Columbia Circuit and, subsequently, for U.S. Supreme Court Justice Thurgood Marshall from 1980 to 1981.

Currently, Carter is the William Nelson Cromwell Professor of Law at Yale Law School, where he has taught since 1982. At Yale, he teaches courses on contracts, evidence, professional responsibility, ethics in literature, intellectual property, and the law and ethics of war.

Carter has received eight honorary degrees, including Bates College, Colgate University, Hamilton College, and the University of Notre Dame. In 1994, he delivered the commencement speech at Stanford University.

== Writing career ==
Carter's non-fiction books have received praise from voices across the political spectrum, from Marion Wright Edelman to John Joseph O'Connor. Carter's first novel, The Emperor of Ocean Park, spent 11 weeks on the New York Times best-seller list in 2002. It won both the 2003 Anisfield-Wolf Book Award (Fiction) and the 2003 BCALA Literary Award, from the Black Caucus of the American Library Association., with further nominations for the NAACP Image Award for Outstanding Literary Work, Fiction, the CWA New Blood Dagger from the Crime Writers' Association, and the 2002 Los Angeles Times Book Prize, in the mystery/thriller category.

His second novel, New England White, and third, Palace Council, form a trilogy of sorts with The Emperor of Ocean Park, all being set in the fictional New England town of Elm Harbor, with some characters from each book appearing in the others.

His fourth novel, Jericho's Fall, was published in July 2009. His book, The Violence of Peace: America's Wars in the Age of Obama, was published in 2011. In August 2014, The Globe and Mail tagged Carter's Back Channel as one of "five new crime novels worth a read."

Carter's work is seen frequently on the op-ed pages of major newspapers. In addition to his policy writings and novels, Carter for several years wrote a feature column in Christianity Today magazine, and he has been quoted in the media on religion in public life. He is currently a Bloomberg View columnist at Bloomberg.com.

== Personal ==
Carter was raised in Harlem, in Washington, D.C., and in Ithaca, New York. He and his wife, Enola G. Aird, have two children. They reside in Connecticut and summer in Martha's Vineyard. They attend St. Luke's Episcopal Church, one of the oldest predominantly black Episcopal churches in the country.

== Works ==
=== Non-fiction ===
External videos
- Booknotes interview with Carter on Reflections of an Affirmative Action Baby, September 29, 1991, C-SPAN
- Presentation by Carter on The Culture of Disbelief, September 27, 1996, C-SPAN
- Presentation by Carter on Civility, August 4, 1998, C-SPAN
- Presentation by Carter on God's Name in Vain, October 15, 2000, C-SPAN
- Presentation by Carter on Invisible, October 15, 2018, C-SPAN

- Reflections of an Affirmative Action Baby. New York: Basic Books, 1991, ISBN 0-465-06871-5.
- The Culture of Disbelief: How American Law and Politics Trivialize Religious Devotion . New York: Anchor, 1991, ISBN 0-385-47498-9. Received the 1994 University of Louisville and Louisville Presbyterian Theological Seminary Grawemeyer Award in Religion.
- The Confirmation Mess: Cleaning Up the Federal Appointments Process. New York: Basic Books, 1994, ISBN 0-465-01364-3.
- Integrity. New York: Harper Perennial, 1997, ISBN 0-06-092807-7. This book regards the current state of public integrity and its philosophical underpinnings.
- The Dissent of the Governed: A Meditation on Law, Religion, and Loyalty, Cambridge: Harvard University Press, 1998, ISBN 0-674-21265-7.
- Civility: Manners, Morals, and the Etiquette of Democracy. New York: Harper Perennial, 1999, ISBN 0-06-097759-0.
- God's Name in Vain: The Wrongs and Rights of Religion in Politics. New York: Basic Books, 2001, ISBN 0-465-00887-9.
- The Violence of Peace: America's Wars in the Age of Obama New York: PublicAffairs, 2011, ISBN 098429516X.
- Invisible: The Forgotten Story of the Black Woman Lawyer Who Took Down America's Most Powerful Mobster. New York: Henry Holt and Company, 2018, ISBN 9781250121974.

=== Novels ===
External videos
- Presentation by Carter on The Emperor of Ocean Park, November 23, 2002, C-SPAN
- Interview with Carter on The Impeachment of Abraham Lincoln, September 22, 2012, C-SPAN

- The Emperor of Ocean Park (2002) is a mystery and thriller involving the law professor son of a disgraced federal judge, whose nomination to the United States Supreme Court collapsed in scandal, and the son's search for the truth behind his father's death.
- New England White (2007) is a thriller in which the wife of the president of an Ivy League university suspects that her husband is covering up a murder committed 30 years ago by one of his two roommates, who are running against one another for the Presidency of the United States.
- Palace Council (2008) involves a two-decade conspiracy to gain control of the Oval Office. The story is set in the 1950s, 1960s, and 1970s, and the major characters include Eddie Wesley, a Harlem writer; Aurelia, the woman Eddie loves, who becomes a professor at Cornell University; and a number of real-life historical figures, including Richard Nixon and Langston Hughes.
- Jericho's Fall (2009) recounts the last days of a "Former Everything" (including Secretary of Defense and CIA Director) who is determined to reveal secrets and the struggles that result, all on a Colorado mountaintop and in a small Colorado town.
- The Impeachment of Abraham Lincoln (2012) is a legal drama-turned-thriller whose plot revolves around the speculation of what would have happened had Abraham Lincoln survived his assassination and gone on to be impeached for exceeding his constitutional authority during the American Civil War. The protagonist Abigail, a young, female, black law graduate, experiences various misadventures in post-War Washington, D.C. as she assists on the President's legal defense team.
- The Church Builder (2013). Published under the nom de plume A. L. Shields, this is the first in a planned series of "Christian" novels about a secret war between faith and the enemies of faith.
- Back Channel (2014) is a thriller set against the background of the Cuban Missile Crisis. a second negotiation—the "back channel"—kept secret even from most of Kennedy's closest advisers. The protagonist, Margo Jensen, a 19-year-old black college student, finds both her courage and her intellect tested constantly as she is thrust unwillingly into the center of great events. She must risk her life as Kennedy's envoy and risk her reputation as (supposedly) Kennedy's lover, all the while seeking to uncover the hidden connection between her own family's past and the crisis unfolding around her. Real people here include Bobby Fischer, the 19-year-old chess champion of the United States and Aleksandr Fomin, head of the KGB's Washington station. Fictional characters from previous works include Jericho Ainsley (Jericho's Fall), Tori Elden (Palace Council), and Kimmer Madison (The Emperor of Ocean Park; New England White) as a toddler.

== See also ==
- Black conservatism in the United States
- List of law clerks for the tenth seat of the Supreme Court of the United States

== Videos ==
- Appearances on C-SPAN
