= Addie Waites Hunton =

African American suffragist (1867–1943)

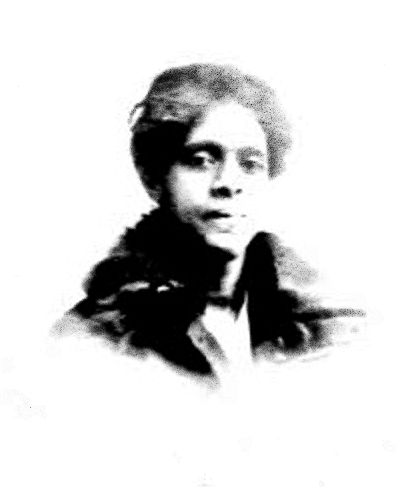
- Born: June 11, 1866; Norfolk, Virginia, U.S.
- Died: June 21, 1943 (aged 77); New York City, U.S.
- Education: Boston Latin School, Spencerian College of Commerce
- Spouse: William Alphaeus Hunton
- Children: W. Alphaeus Hunton Jr.; Eunice Hunton Carter

Addie Waites Hunton (June 11, 1866 – June 22, 1943) was an African-American suffragist, race and gender activist, writer, political organizer, and educator. In 1889, Hunton became the first black woman to graduate from Spencerian College of Commerce. She worked for the Young Women's Christian Association (YWCA), served as the national organizer for the National Association of Colored Women (NACW) from 1906 to 1910, and served in the U.S. Army during World War I. Hunton was a regular participant in the work of the Equal Suffrage League.

== Early years and education ==
Addie D. Waites was born in Norfolk, Virginia, on June 11, 1866, to Jesse and Adeline Waites. Her mother died when she was very young, and Hunton then moved to Boston to be raised by her maternal aunt. In Boston, Hunton attended the Boston Latin School and graduated with a high school diploma. After high school, she attended Spencerian College of Commerce and became the first black woman to graduate in 1889.

== Career ==
After graduation, Hunton moved to Normal, Alabama, to teach at the State Normal and Agricultural College, which is now known as the Alabama Agricultural and Mechanical University.

In New York, Hunton was recognized by the National Board of the YWCA in 1907 and appointed as secretary. She was responsible for organizing projects among black students. Additionally, she traveled through the South and Midwest to conduct a survey for the YWCA. Hunton is well known for her social welfare efforts among the black community. Furthermore, she recruited a number of other black women to work for the YWCA, such as Eva del Vakia Bowles and Elizabeth Ross Haynes. From 1909 to 1910, Hunton moved with her children to Europe. Her husband was suffering from health issues and remained at home in the U.S.. While in Europe, Hunton lived in Switzerland and then moved to Strasbourg, Germany, where she studied part-time at Kaiser Wilhelm University. When Hunton and her children moved back to America, she continued to work with the YWCA and also began to take courses at the City College of New York. At this time, her husband William was in a critical state with tuberculosis. The Hunton family then moved to Saranac Lake, New York, where they stayed until his death in 1916.

In 1917, the U.S. entered World War I. Hunton quickly became involved through YMCA, and in June 1918, she set sail for France. She was one of three black women, the others being Kathryn Johnson and Helen Curtis, who were assigned to work with the 200,000 segregated black troops stationed in France. Hunton soon became exposed to the racism against African-American soldiers. She saw efforts by the American Command to regulate the lives of black soldiers, recreating a system reminiscent of Jim Crow. In France, Hunton began working for the Services of Supplies sector at Saint Nazaire. She introduced many new programs to increase the quality of the soldiers' lives, including a literacy course and a discussion series on art, music, and religion, and other topics. Of Hunton's many wartime efforts, a particularly gruesome assignment was given to her in May 1919. She was sent to a military cemetery and was ordered to oversee and comfort black soldiers who were assigned to recover the dead from the battlefield of the Meuse-Argonne and rebury them.

During the 1920s she was actively involved with the Republican Party. During the 1928 Presidential Election, she was "instrumental" to voter organization and outreach for the Hoover-Curtis ticket in New York City. Following the election, New Yorkers wanted to have the related political club continue its activities and renamed it the Addie W. Hunton Republican Club.

== Personal life ==
In July 1893, she married William Alphaeus Hunton, who was working in Norfolk, Virginia, to establish YMCA for Negro youth. Hunton worked closely with her husband as his secretary. In 1899, the couple moved to Atlanta, Georgia, where Hunton gave birth to four children, of which only two survived infancy, including Eunice Hunton. After seven years in Atlanta, the couple moved to Brooklyn, New York, following the Atlanta riot of 1906, as they feared for their safety.

From 1909 to 1910, Hunton took her children to study at the Kaiser Wilhelm University in Strasbourg, Germany, after which she enrolled in courses at the College of the City of New York. In 1914, Hunton's husband William died. Hunton and Kathryn Johnson wrote a book documenting their experience of war time tragedies and race-relations within American forces, titled Two Colored Women With the American Expeditionary Forces, published in 1920. In May 1923 she married James W. Floyd; they divorced by 1924. Hunton published a book about her husband's life and work, entitled William Alphaeus Hunton, A Pioneer Prophet of Young Men, in 1938. She died in Brooklyn on June 21, 1943.

Her daughter Eunice Carter, son Alphaeus Hunton, Jr., grandson Lisle C. Carter, and great-grandson Stephen L. Carter have had prominent careers in law, higher education, and activism.

== Legacy ==
Hunton is known for her commitment to peace, race relations, and the empowerment of the African-American community, especially women. She created a three-part peace strategy. First, she encouraged African-American women to create an international organization for themselves. Second, Hunton believed that African-American women should get involved in the Pan-African movement, which was predominantly male-dominated at this point. Finally, she aimed to involved African-American women in the mainly white U.S. movement for peace.

== Works ==
- William Alphaeus Hunton: A Pioneer Prophet of Young Men. 1938
- Two Colored Women with the American Expeditionary Forces, with Kathryn M. Johnson. 1920
