= The Emperor of Ocean Park =

2002 novel by Stephen L. Carter

- Original 2002 hardback front cover
- Author: Stephen L. Carter
- Audio read by: Richard Allen
- Language: English
- Series: Elm Harbor
- Genre: Thriller, Mystery
- Publisher: Knopf
- Publication date: June 2, 2002
- Publication place: United States
- Media type: Print (hardback & paperback)
- Pages: 657
- ISBN: 0224062840
- Followed by: New England White
- Website: The Emperor of Ocean Park

The Emperor of Ocean Park is a 2002 novel by American author and law professor Stephen L. Carter. It is the first part of Carter's Elm Harbor series; two more novels in the series were published in 2007 and 2008. The book was Carter's first work of fiction, and spent 11 weeks on The New York Times best-seller list following its publication. Described as a murder mystery, the novel tells the story of Talcott Garland, a law professor who uncovers a mystery surrounding his father, the titular 'Emperor of Ocean Park'. Written from Tal's first person perspective, the book explores themes of privileged black identity, politics, and law, and contains many allusions to chess.

Because a number of publishing houses were interested in obtaining the rights to the book, Carter received an exceptionally large advance of $4.2 million. The size of the advance, for a debut novel from an African-American writer, contributed to an important shift for African-American literature, with the book marketed and received as a mainstream work of fiction, rather than one aimed at a specialized audience. The novel was well-reviewed by most critics, with attention being drawn to its then-unusual setting for a murder mystery story, featuring an African-American protagonist and with most of the story taking place in wealthy, predominantly African-American neighborhoods in Washington, D.C., and Martha's Vineyard. It won the 2003 Anisfield-Wolf Book Award and BCALA Literary Award, and was nominated for several more, including the NAACP Image Award for Outstanding Literary Work, Fiction and the New Blood Dagger from the Crime Writers' Association. An American television adaptation of the same name began broadcast on MGM+ in July 2024.

== Plot ==
Talcott “Tal” Garland is a tenured, Black law professor at the fictional Elm Harbor University (an analog to Yale). He is the son of Oliver Garland, a wealthy and respected former federal judge who, in 1986, was nominated by President Ronald Reagan to serve on the Supreme Court. However, during his confirmation hearings, it came to light that Judge Garland had had secret dealings with Jack Ziegler, a shadowy ex-CIA operative-turned-mogul with ties to organized crime. Though he was never formally accused of wrongdoing, the scandal ended the Judge's judicial career, and he later resigned from the bench to become a well-paid mascot for conservative organizations and causes. Talcott Garland, because of his family's wealth and emotional distance, feels alienated from the rest of the Black community and also from his wife Kimmer, an accomplished lawyer in her own right whom Talcott suspects of cheating.

On the same day Kimmer finds out that she is being considered for a federal judgeship, Talcott learns that his father has died. The death is officially ruled a heart attack, but Talcott's sister Mariah is convinced that their father was murdered. At the funeral, Jack Ziegler appears and demands to know about a set of “arrangements” the Judge supposedly made before his death, which Talcott knows nothing about. Ziegler encourages Talcott to find out what the arrangements are and warns him to “beware of the others."

After the funeral, there are many other disturbing developments. Talcott discovers a scrapbook containing newspaper clippings about his youngest sister, Abigail, who died decades ago at the age of fifteen in an unsolved hit-and-run car crash. Two men claiming to be FBI agents show up and interview Talcott about his father's "arrangements," though it is later revealed that they were impostors. Freeman Bishop, the family pastor who officiated the Judge's funeral, is found tortured to death. Talcott inherits the Garland family summer home on Martha’s Vineyard, but arrives with Kimmer and their three-year-old son Bentley to find that the house has been ransacked. Upstairs, Talcott discovers a cryptic note from his late father, telling him that the “arrangements” are in the care of “Angela's boyfriend".

Talcott soon realizes that he is being watched by representatives of multiple competing, nebulous interests, all of whom hope that he will lead them to the arrangements. These include Jack Ziegler, one of the two impostor FBI agents (a private investigator named Colin Scott who is later said to have drowned), the FBI itself, and a mysterious woman named Maxine. Over a period of several months, Talcott visits many of the late Judge's family and associates, including Ziegler himself, Supreme Court Justice Wallace Wainwright, and his own brother and sister, Addison and Mariah. In the process, he accumulates various clues: decades ago, Colin Scott visited Judge Garland in his home, where the two men argued about “rules”; while serving on the bench, the Judge did indeed slant his rulings in favor of Jack Ziegler as his enemies believed; and Freeman Bishop was tortured to death by Colin Scott, who wrongly believed that he was “Angela's boyfriend.” The search takes a toll on Talcott's personal life by damaging his reputation at the law school and straining his marriage to Kimmer (who fears that the investigation will damage her own chances at the judgeship).

Eventually, with the help of his friend Dana, Talcott buries a lockbox in an Elm Harbor cemetery and tricks the shadowy forces into believing that it contains the arrangements. While digging up the lockbox in the middle of the night, Talcott and Dana are accosted at gunpoint by Colin Scott (who faked his own death to avoid suspicion). Talcott attacks Scott and is shot three times, before Maxine emerges, kills Scott, and steals the lockbox. Talcott survives, and because the lockbox contains nothing of value, his antagonists conclude that the “arrangements” never existed at all and that the Judge's threat was a bluff. Having thrown them off his trail, Talcott recovers and resumes teaching. He also discovers that Kimmer (who was passed over for the judgeship) has been having an affair with one his of students, and so he files for separation, rents a new apartment, and spends more time with Bentley.

Finally, Talcott succeeds in piecing together the mystery surrounding his father's death: decades ago, after Abigail was killed, the Judge hired Colin Scott to identify the driver of the car that hit her, who turned out to be the son of a powerful U.S. senator. The Judge demanded that Colin Scott kill the driver, but Scott refused, citing the “rules” of the criminal underworld. The Judge appealed to his old friend Jack Ziegler, who persuaded Colin Scott to carry out the murder and then used it to blackmail the Judge (whose outspoken, right-wing persona was an ideological cover for his judicial corruption). Unwilling to serve on the Supreme Court while beholden to criminal interests, the Judge secretly sabotaged his own nomination process, and committed suicide years later at his desk.

Talcott realizes that "Angela's boyfriend" is one of Abigail's old stuffed animals, which she named after George Jackson (a Black Panther activist and the lover of Angela Davis). He travels to the family home on Martha's Vineyard and retrieves the stuffed animal. Inside is a floppy disk containing the Judge's "arrangements": proof of widespread, institutional corruption that reveals the full extent of Jack Ziegler's criminal enterprise and implicates many powerful figures in U.S. politics and business. As a vicious Nor'easter batters the island, Talcott is threatened at gunpoint in his home by the Judge's former colleague Justice Wainwright, who is also corrupt and wants to use the arrangements to force Jack Ziegler to allow him retire. Talcott flees out into the storm and is pursued by Justice Wainwright. The stuffed animal falls into the ocean, and Wainwright drowns while attempting to reach it.

Talcott recovers the stuffed animal and the floppy disk (which is damaged but still partially usable), returns to Elm Harbor, and gets on with his life. The story ends with Talcott throwing the floppy disk into a fireplace, symbolically choosing to move on from his father's legacy and face the future.

== Development history ==
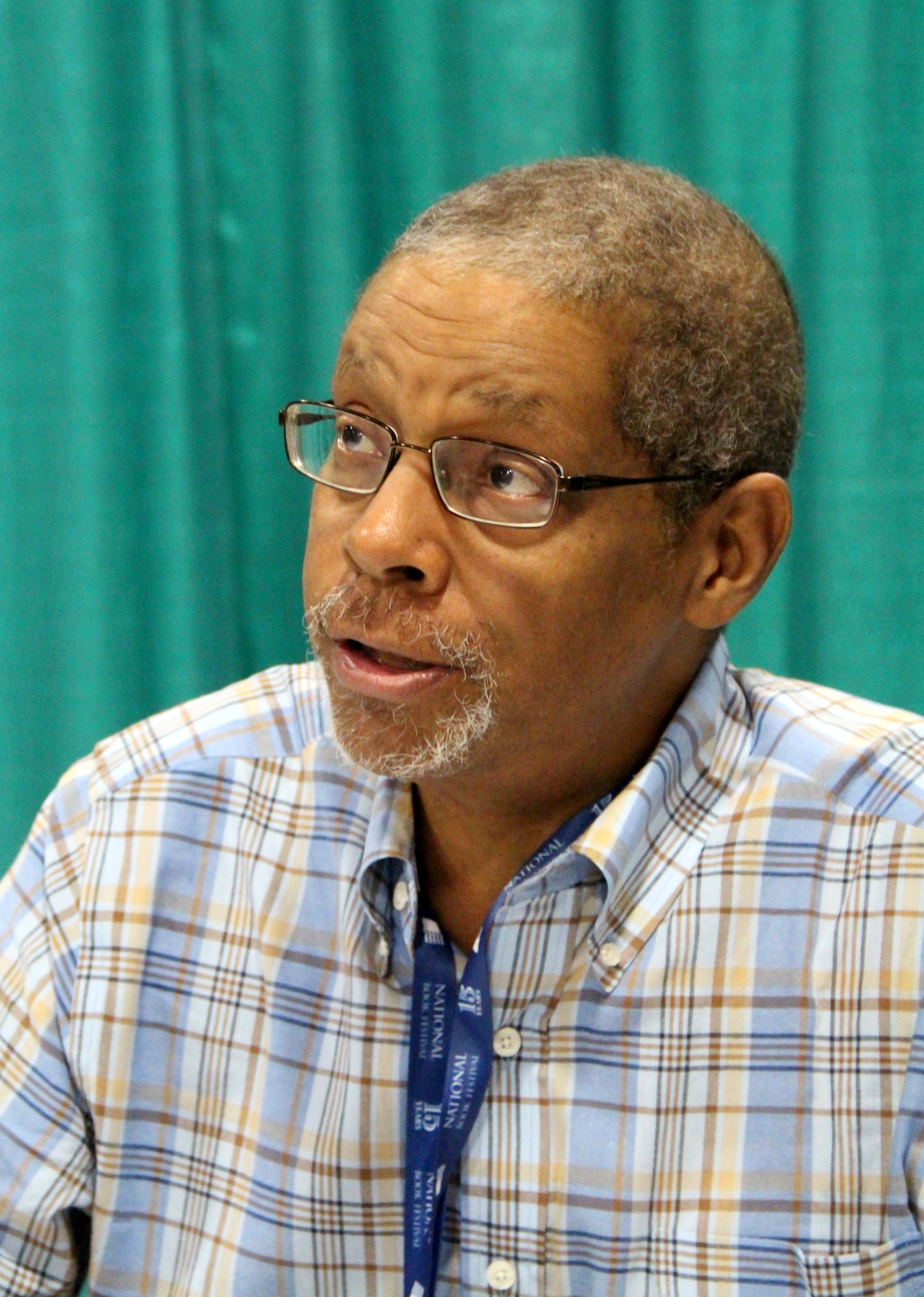
Author Stephen L. Carter in 2015

Stephen L. Carter wrote The Emperor of Ocean Park while working as a Professor of Law at Yale. In a 2002 interview, Carter, who had already written several non-fiction books in his career, said that the idea for a fiction novel had "always been in the back of [his] mind", and that the major characters of the novel had been ones he had tried to fit into various drafts and unpublished stories over the preceding years. Carter started working on the book in the mid-1990s, writing mostly at night while working at Yale during the day; it took him four years to complete in draft.

He originally created an outline for the novel because that was how he wrote his scholarly arguments in non-fiction pieces, but as the story's content changed dramatically, Carter found the outline restrictive and discarded it. At one point, the draft manuscript grew to 1,300 pages long, nearly twice the length of the published novel. In December 2000, Carter and his wife decided that he should focus all his time on finishing the final version. He spent six weeks "polishing the draft into shape".

Many of the legal and political topics addressed in the book, such as the workings of the FBI, the appointment process for the Supreme Court, and the political lobbying of judges were topics on which Carter had previously published non-fiction books and writings, making it possible for him to use this knowledge in writing the novel without requiring extensive research. In particular, his scholarly works The Confirmation Mess, The Culture of Disbelief, Civility, and Reflections of an Affirmative Action Baby were all touchpoints in writing The Emperor of Ocean Park.

Carter said his fiction writing was influenced by Go Tell It on the Mountain author James Baldwin and Langston Hughes, in particular how Hughes wrote dialogue.

A fierce bidding war for publication and adaptation rights ensued in early 2001 among American publishers Knopf, sister publisher Random House, and others. Carter was given $4.2 million, one of the largest advances ever received by a first-time author of fiction from Knopf for the rights to publish a book. The advance included the rights to Carter's second novel, New England White, which was published in 2008. With Knopf and Random House making bids of equal value, Carter chose Knopf because he remembered the support he had been given from Knopf's editor-in chief, Sonny Mehta, who had read a few early draft chapters of the novel in 1998 and encouraged Carter to keep working on it. Carter received a further $1 million from Jonathan Cape for the British publishing rights.

The size of the advance was discussed widely. At the time of the novel's publication, The Economist described it as a "reckless gamble" by Knopf, noting Carter had never written a work of fiction before. Writing for Newsweek, David Gates was also critical of the advance, which he suggested was "a way to make a Denzel Washington movie out of it", or that Knopf saw Carter as a black Tom Wolfe. Discussing the reviews in a piece for The Weekly Standard, Arnold Beichman said that much of the criticism of the book was because of the large advance Carter received for his debut novel.

=== Publication history ===
The Emperor of Ocean Park was first released in hardcover on June 2, 2002, published in the United States by Knopf. The paperback was released in the US on May 27, 2003.

In 2002, it became the first book featured on the Today Show's book club, where it was selected by writer John Grisham, who is known for his own legal mysteries. It was featured on the cover of The New York Times Book Review on June 16. The interest generated by a national print and television advertising campaign plus a twelve-city promotional tour, along with positive reviews and media attention, led Knopf to claim to have been required to print an additional 250,000 hardcover copies within the first month of the book's release to meet demand beyond the initial print run of 275,000. The Observer reported that this claim was an exaggeration on the publisher's part to drum up additional publicity, and the actual print run in total was around 300,000 copies, with the total sales in hardcover being around 350,000 copies. The Emperor of Ocean Park immediately went to number one on Amazon.com and spent 11 weeks on the New York Times best-seller list. Carter said that "the enthusiasm and even affection that has greeted the novel and the characters has overwhelmed me".

An audiobook version, narrated by Richard Allen, was released on July 21, 2003. The Emperor of Ocean Park forms part one of Carter's Elm Harbor series; the second book (New England White) was released in 2007, and the third (Palace Council) in 2008. Neither New England White nor Palace Council feature Talcott Garland as a character: New England White promotes two minor characters from The Emperor of Ocean Park – Lemaster and Julia Carlyle – to the main protagonists, and Palace Council is set from 1952 to 1974, with the main character, Eddie Wesley, being related to the Garland family by marriage.

== Major themes ==
Position: a8 black knight, c8 black rook, d8 black bishop, b7 black pawn, f7 black pawn, h7 black pawn, b6 black pawn, b5 white rook, h5 white king, a3 black pawn, e3 black pawn, g3 white pawn, h3 white knight, b2 white pawn, c2 white pawn, e2 white rook, a1 white knight, h1 black king

An example of an Excelsior chess problem, by Sam Loyd. White to move and mate in five with "the least likely piece or pawn".

The Emperor of Ocean Park was noted by many critics to bring together two themes – the "lowbrow" genre fiction style, in particular using the principles and thematic elements of a pulp thriller or murder mystery, and the "highbrow" literary fiction style, in which Carter reflects on black America – what Carter (as Talcott Garland) refers to as the "darker nation" – from a black perspective. Ocean Park is an area of Oak Bluffs, a summer colony on Martha's Vineyard, Massachusetts. Until the 1960s, Oak Bluffs was the only town on Martha's Vineyard that welcomed black tourists, as other towns on the island did not allow black guests to stay in inns and hotels. Carter summers there, and noted the enduring appeal of Martha's Vineyard to middle and upper-class African-American families.

Racial themes and expository sections on upper-class black culture form a large part of the narrative of The Emperor of Ocean Park, with the lead character being described as highly self-conscious of his race and how that influences his life. Carter said in an online interview with MSNBC that he was "quite aware that very little in literature or in the media ever focuses on middle class and upper middle class Black Americans. If the success of this book means that publishers or film makers will be more interested in this class, that's a good thing. On the other hand, I wouldn't want the book's focus on that group to mean we should stop thinking about those who are being left behind." Parallels were drawn between Carter's work and that of Lawrence Otis Graham, who explored the lives of upper-class black Americans in his social commentaries.

Professor Ben Barton of the California Law Review said the novel was "unmistakably a product by a legal academic"; Carter delves into great detail around a number of legal issues throughout the novel, calling upon his legal experience and research. Judge Oliver Garland is described as an amalgam of Robert Bork and Clarence Thomas; Carter noted that he was inspired to write about Judge Garland's travails during his confirmation hearing by his having watched the hearings of Clarence Thomas. Carter wanted to ensure that his character's lives were fully rounded and, particularly as a Christian, he wanted the novel to reflect that many of his characters had religious beliefs. In one interview, he drew a comparison between those beliefs and the seemingly strictly secular world of the modern college campus.

The introductory epigraph ("Two fools always win, but three fools, never!") at the start of the book is a quote attributed by Carter to Siegbert Tarrasch, a chess writer of the late 19th and early 20th century. Carter is a member of the United States Chess Federation, and chess plays a major part in The Emperor of Ocean Park; the novel included a great number of allegories to chess, equating white characters with the white pieces, and black characters with the black. Early in the book, two pawns – one white, one black – go missing from the chessboard in Tal's father's study. The book is divided into three main sections, each named after an element of chess theory, again as allegories to the themes within the book; Nowotny Interference, in which two black pieces obstruct one another; Turton Doubling, when one white piece withdraws to enable a second white piece to move in front of it and jointly attack the black king; and Unprovided Flight, where only one move is available to the black king, and checkmate is imminent. The final chapter is entitled "Double Excelsior", in reference to the Excelsior problem, linking back to the Judge's original note for Talcott, and suggesting the one remaining black pawn (Tal) and the last white pawn (Ziegler) had been slowly moving toward one another, to be promoted to knights, with the only apparent ending being for the two pieces to collude (known as a "helpmate"), and the only possible result being that the black side must lose.

In a lengthy author's note at the end of the novel, Carter says that the book was decidedly not a roman à clef. While superficially, Stephen Carter and Talcott Garland shared a number of characteristics – they were both middle-aged professors of law at prestigious colleges, both summered at Martha's Vineyard as part of the wealthy black community there, both were chess fans, both were married to other lawyers, and so on – Carter considered that the resemblance ended there. He says that Garland is an original literary creation, as are all the other characters. This was gently mocked by some critics. Political scientist Michael Nelson said the "similarities between creator and creature are just too numerous and important to ignore". Carter acknowledged the author's note was "absurdly long", justifying it a reaction to not being able to put footnotes throughout the book, unlike in his non-fiction writing. Instead, he appended them to the end of the novel, saying "I don't think I could have written a novel, as a scholar, without making sure I got my facts right and making sure the reader knew."

== Literary significance and reception ==
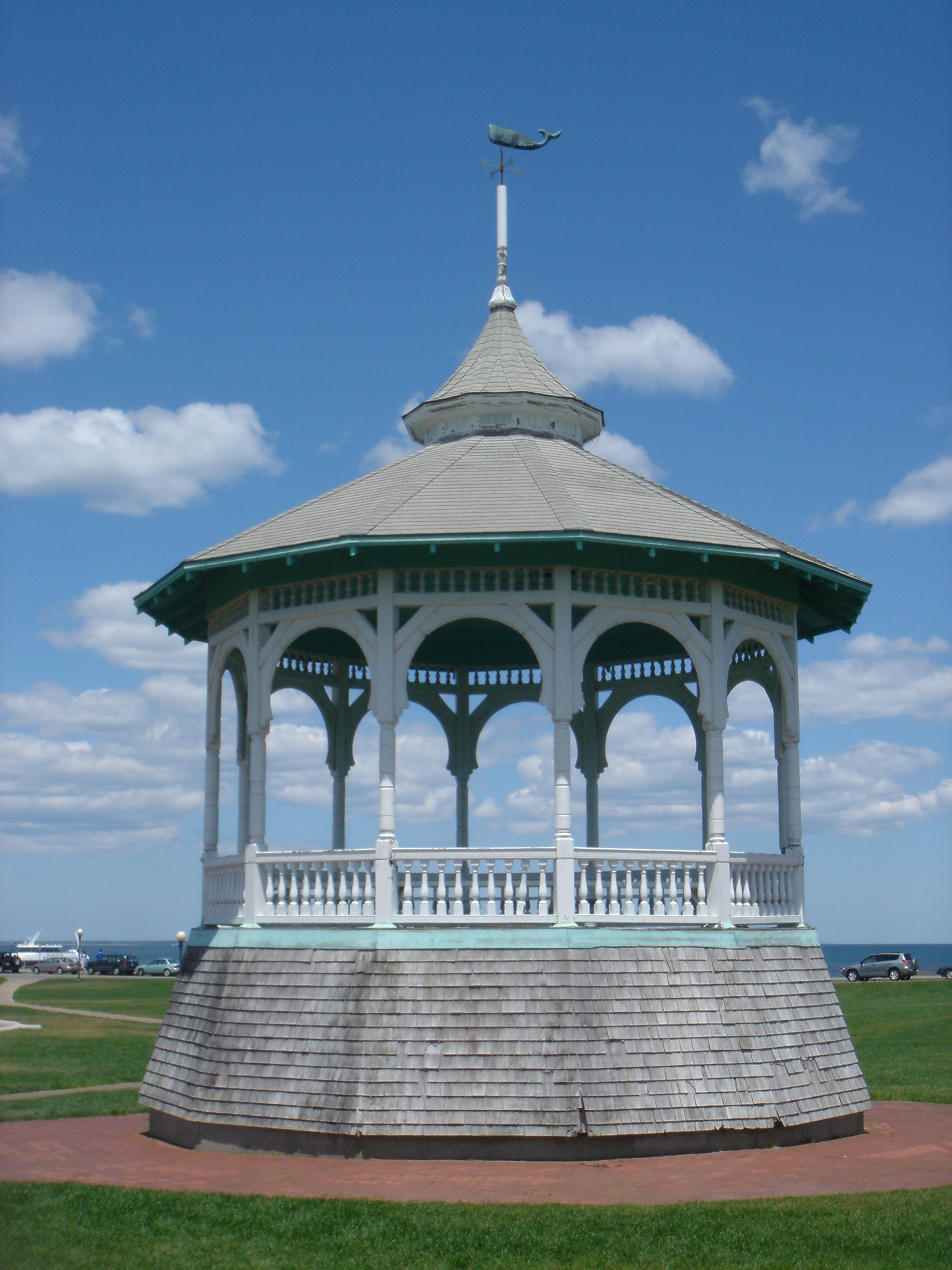
The Ocean Park gazebo in Oak Bluffs.

In an early review, Publishers Weekly forecast that The Emperor of Ocean Park would bring Carter wide recognition as a novelist. The novel received a broadly positive reception upon release, although some responses were mixed. In a review for the New York Times, writer Ward Just discussed at length the preoccupation of the book with describing the world of the black bourgeoisie, and suggested that "in Stephen Carter, the black upper class has found its Dreiser" – referring to the influential naturalist author Theodore Dreiser. It was described as an "expansively, constantly interesting book" by The Detroit Free Press, which suggested it would be popular summer reading material. Like others, Jelani Cobb of The Crisis noted that the book features aspects of both genre and literary fiction, describing Carter's attempt to bring the two together as sprawling and sublime. He drew attention to the unusual protagonist, describing the Talcott Garland character as "jaded, overweight, and profoundly insecure". Historian Elizabeth Fox-Genovese considered the book to be "gripping", and noted that Carter had over a decade of experience in writing non-fiction about politics, law, and religion. She suggested that he may have used fiction to allow him more freedom to explore these topics, away from the didactic requirements of non-fiction.

In an episode of the Newsnight Review for the BBC, novelist Ian Rankin said he thought the book was "very well written but badly constructed" due to the conflation of a number of thriller cliches, and that the over-complicated plot obscured a great story. The A.V. Club suggested Carter had a tendency to overwrite, and too often strayed away from a "spellbinding" plot in the novel's exposition. Carter's writing style was noted for being at times dispassionate, and 'chilly', particularly when straying away from the more esoteric topics the novel covers and into the personal, with criticism of some descriptions (such as of a young child being "childlike"). The density of the book was discussed, with some reviewers suggesting that the multitude of references to chess required a certain knowledge of the game in order to appreciate the allusions and clues contained through the book. Others said that the writing was at times clunky, and the extensive social commentary detracted from the narrative flow. In a negative review for the London Review of Books, critic Lorin Stein described the book as "long-winded [and] shoddily put together", and discussed why many American reviewers paid deference to what he thought was a high-toned airport novel. Stein found various inconsistencies within the book to be distracting, noting an example where a pool table appears mid-scene in a room previously described as "tiny", and said the plot was goofy and implausible.

The publication of The Emperor of Ocean Park was described as part of a major shift for African-American literature. Instead of being marketed as a niche novel, the record-breaking advance, the publicity around its release, and the jacket art placed it firmly in the mainstream, as a "blockbusting, best-selling legal thriller". It was noted by John Kevin Young, though, that despite the marketing for the novel being "color-blind", the reviews and press attention to the book still drew attention to the race of the author and the characters within the novel, suggesting that the world of wealthy African Americans had been previously "hidden" to the white reader. While such commentary was outside of Knopf's control, it reinforced the pattern of how the mainstream media responded to African-American literature.

== Awards ==
Year	Award	Category	Result	Ref.
2002	CWA New Blood Dagger	—	Shortlisted	
2002	Los Angeles Times Book Prize	Mystery/Thriller	Finalist	
2002	NAACP Image Award	Fiction	Shortlisted	
2003	Anisfield-Wolf Book Award	Fiction	Won	
2003	BCALA Literary Award	First Novelist	Won	
2004	International Dublin Literary Award	—	Longlisted	

== Adaptations ==
As part of the significant advance Carter obtained with Knopf in 2001, Knopf received the rights to any subsequent screen adaptations of The Emperor of Ocean Park. Variety reported that, after reading an early version of the manuscript, a number of production companies were interested in acquiring the rights to create a movie adaptation of the novel. The rights were preemptively optioned by Warner Bros., John Wells Productions, and Gaylord Films prior to the novel being published. Stephen Schiff completed a script adaptation in 2003 which was attached to director Carl Franklin, and Attica Locke, novelist, screenwriter and producer for the series Empire, completed another script in 2009. Actor Wendell Pierce said in early 2015 that a movie adaptation of The Emperor of Ocean Park would be his dream project. It was also reported in 2015 that writer Katori Hall was working with John Wells on a television pilot of The Emperor of Ocean Park for Fox Network. Later that year writer Frank Bergon said that "last heard, the script was "under rewrite", maybe in "turnaround"."

MGM+ (formerly Epix) ordered a 10-episode television series adaptation of the novel in April 2023 with Wells and Sherman Payne as executive producers. In early 2024, Deadline announced that the cast would include Grantham Coleman as Tal, Tiffany Mack as Mariah, and Forest Whitaker as Judge Oliver Garland.
