= An Affair of the Skin =

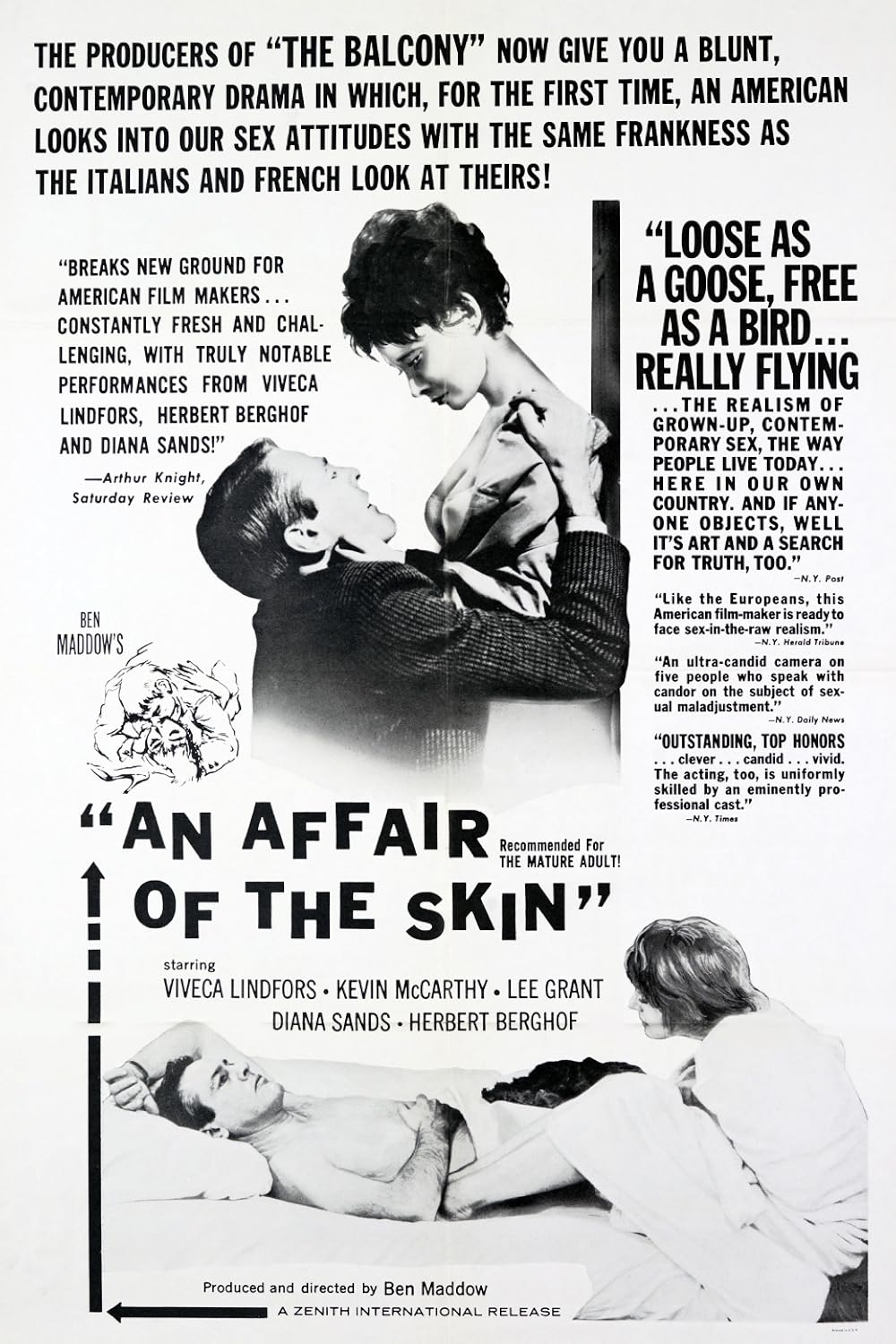
- Theatrical release poster
- Directed by: Ben Maddow
- Written by: Ben Maddow
- Produced by: Helen Levitt; Ben Maddow
- Starring: Viveca Lindfors; Kevin McCarthy; Lee Grant; Diana Sands; Herbert Berghof
- Cinematography: Roger Barlow; David Shore
- Edited by: Verna Fields
- Distributed by: Zenith International Film Corp.
- Release date: November 20, 1963 (New York)
- Running time: 102 minutes
- Country: United States

An Affair of the Skin (also known as Love as Disorder) is a 1963 American drama film written and directed by Ben Maddow and starring Viveca Lindfors and Kevin McCarthy. It is a story of romantic entanglements as seen through the eyes of a black woman photographer.

== Plot ==
In New York, Victoria, Allen and his wife Katherine face problems in three intertwined stories. Victoria is an aging fashion model who is afraid to part with her young lover because she thinks that she is too old to find another love. Allen and Katherine are an unhappily married neurotic couple with problems of their own.

== Cast ==
- Viveca Lindfors as Victoria
- Kevin McCarthy as Allen McCleod
- Lee Grant as Katherine McCleod
- Diana Sands as Janice
- Herbert Berghof as Max
- Nancy Malone as Claire
- Osceola Archer as Mrs. Cluny
- Will Lee as waiter

== Production ==
Director Ben Maddow felt that that the initial release of An Affair of the Skin had been rushed for financial reasons.. In 1973, 10 years after the film's initial release, Maddow reedited and released it again under the title Love as Disorder..

== Reception ==
In a contemporary review for The New York Times, critic Eugene Archer wrote:

Pretentiousness is the order of the day in 'An Affair of the Skin' ... Ben Maddow, remembered for 'The Savage Eye,' has fallen into the trap of clever phraseology that marred the earlier film. His dialogue, instead of functioning to tell the admittedly thin story of five morose New Yorkers immersed in interlocking relationships, concentrates on glib philosophical diatribes and studied quips. Furthermore, as if in love with his own lines, he has directed the drama at a pace slow enough to over-emphasize every syllable in the script. This is doubly irritating, because the New York photography of this moderately budgeted film is outstanding, and the remaining technical credits are thoroughly expert. The acting, too, is uniformly skilled by an eminently professional cast.

Time wrote: "An Affair of the Skin just misses being a first-class parody of the foreign art films that inspired it. Purporting to show 'the realism of grownup, contemporary sex' in America – not in England or France or Italy – Producer-Writer-Director Ben Maddow (The Savage Eye) serves up a mannered little pastiche of urban infidelities that is pure counterfeit."

== See also ==
- List of American films of 1963
