= Palace Council =

2008 novel by Stephen L. Carter

- Original 2008 hardback cover, featuring the White House at night.
- Author: Stephen L. Carter
- Language: English
- Series: Elm Harbor
- Genre: Thriller, Mystery
- Publisher: Knopf
- Publication date: 1 July 2008
- Publication place: United States
- Media type: Print (hardback & paperback)
- Pages: 513
- ISBN: 9780307266583
- Preceded by: New England White
- Followed by: Jericho's Fall

Palace Council is a 2008 thriller novel by American author Stephen L. Carter. The book was Carter's third work of fiction.

The novel forms the third part of Carter's Elm Harbor series, which began with 2002's The Emperor of Ocean Park, and continued with New England White, which was published in 2007. Set in Cold War America, and featuring protagonist Eddie Wesley encountering a string of real historical figures and major events, intertwined with conspiracy theories, the book was significantly less well-received than Carter's first two novels, drawing praise for its detail, world-building, and the accuracy of its historical portrayals, but also some criticism for the prose and the levels of coincidence that "frequently stretched belief".

== Plot ==
The story in Palace Council takes place between 1952 and 1975. Set predominately in Harlem, New York and Washington D.C., the book focuses on the mysterious murder of Philmont Castle, a famous white lawyer. The body is discovered on a snowy night in 1955 by protagonist Eddie Wesley, a young black writer. Wesley discovers the body in a park after leaving early from an engagement party for Aurelia Treene and Kevin Garland, as Wesley had been in love with Aurelia for many years. Castle is a close friend of the Garlands, and Wesley comes under suspicion for the murder.

However, in Castle's hand is a cross with an inscription; Wesley begins to look into this and discovers a series of secrets that reveal the reason for the murder and unveil a conspiracy that extends all the way to the White House. The cross is revealed to be a sigil of the Palace Council, a mysterious group of wealthy black and white power-brokers that purportedly controls the government, and which has ties to a violent guerrilla organisation known as Jewel Agony. Wesley's sister, Junie, disappeared some years earlier and is believed to be part of this organisation. Wesley has been trying to locate his sister, and continues to do so, while over the years changing careers from writing, where he wins two National Book Awards, to being part of the Kennedy administration and a confidant of Richard Nixon, and then leaving politics to become an investigative journalist.

Kevin Garland is murdered in an explosion, and as a result Aurelia also begins investigating the Palace Council.

== Development history ==
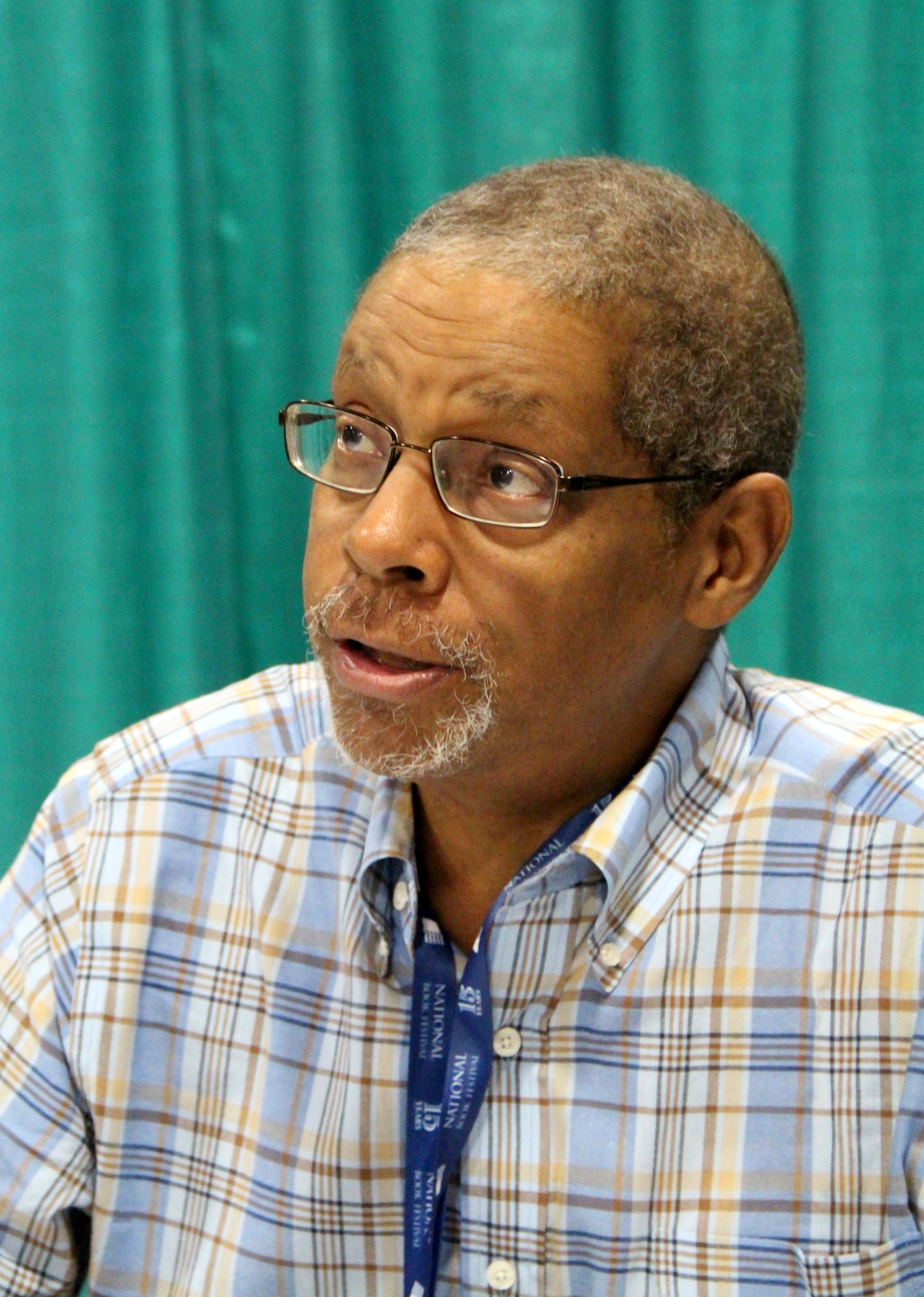
Author Stephen L. Carter in 2015

=== Publication history ===
The hardcover edition of Palace Council was released in the United States by Knopf on 1 July 2008. The paperback version was published by Knopf on 6 June 2009. The book was included on the Richard & Judy book club in the UK in the summer of 2009.

== Major themes ==
The Garland family featured in this book include the parents of Judge Oliver Garland, who appeared in The Emperor of Ocean Park. The novel is set over the course of the civil rights movement, the Vietnam War, and the Watergate scandal, and includes appearances from real-life figures including Langston Hughes, Richard Nixon, Joseph P. Kennedy Sr., J. Edgar Hoover and Barbra Streisand. Aurelia Treene appeared as an elderly character in New England White, set some 50 years later than Palace Council.

Quotes from English poet John Milton, including some from Paradise Lost, appear throughout the book, anchoring each section of the story.

== Literary significance and reception ==
Writing for the New York Times, Janet Maslin described Carter's prose as "cool, polished and dilatory", and ridiculed the claims of the jacket copy that the book gave an "electrifying" portrayal of key historical figures such as Nixon, but praised the elements about privileged black society, noting that Carter seemed much more comfortable writing about the protagonist's friends and family rather than his efforts to weave in major historical events. In The Guardian, Mark Lawson suggested that Carter's slow, methodical, well-researched writing lent the novel a sense of foreshadowing, and opined that it was a "historical thriller that efficiently deliver[ed] both thrills and history". The Washington Post was similarly positive, with Scott Simon singling out Carter's vignettes of historic figures which he considered demonstrated both scholarship and imagination, and suggested his portrayal of Richard Nixon was "pitch-perfect".

In a piece by Jabari Asim in the Los Angeles Times, Asim expressed an irritation with Carter's "tell not show" approach to story-telling, making the novel increasingly complicated. He also mocked the frequency at which the Eddie Wesley character happened to be present at various historical events, describing the character as "part James Baldwin, part Graham Greene, and part Zelig". However, Asim was more positive about the world-building Carter undertook, finding it entertaining to hypothesize about which minor characters in Palace Council may emerge as key characters in Carter's future works. Entertainment Weekly was particularly critical of the novel, wondering how it was that Carter could "publish a third novel that reads like a first draft" and lamented the difference between Carter's first two novels and this one, which it described as a "sub-Dan Brown cryptography thriller that panders to .. paranoia about New World Order high jinks", and, similar to the LA Times, was scathing about how Eddie Wesley "Forrest Gump"ed his way through the history of 1950s and 1960s America. Mark Bauerlein sarcastically expressed surprise that Eddie had missed Woodstock, given that he had attended every other event of significance in the 1960s, but leavened his criticism in the Wall Street Journal by noting the novel was nonetheless entertaining, and that the storytelling was "underpinned by a masterly evocation of the world of wealthy and accomplished blacks in 20th-century America". The Houston Chronicle remarked that it was a shame the fictional novels written by Eddie Wesley all sounded as though they would be far more interesting than the actual novel Carter had written.
