= New England White =

2007 novel by Stephen L. Carter

- Original 2007 hardback front cover
- Author: Stephen L. Carter
- Audio read by: Bahni Turpin
- Language: English
- Series: Elm Harbor
- Genre: Thriller, Mystery
- Publisher: Knopf
- Publication date: June 26, 2007
- Publication place: United States
- Pages: 576
- ISBN: 9780375413629
- Preceded by: The Emperor of Ocean Park
- Followed by: Palace Council
- Website: New England White

New England White is a 2007 novel by American author Stephen L. Carter. The book was Carter's second work of fiction, and forms the second part of Carter's Elm Harbor series, following 2002's The Emperor of Ocean Park and preceding 2008's Palace Council. A murder mystery, the novel is set in a fictional town in New England, and tells the story of the murder of a black economist, and the intrigue that surrounds the attempts to cover up both this and a murder 30 years previously in the same town, drawing on issues around race, academia, and politics.

For his work on New England White, Carter won the 2008 BCALA Literary Award, and was nominated for the 2008 NAACP Image Award for Outstanding Literary Work, Fiction.

== Plot ==
The novel is set in 2003, in the fictional New England university town of Elm Harbor. The main protagonist is Julia Veazie Carlyle, a deputy dean in the divinity department of the local university (a thinly veiled and unnamed version of Yale University). Her husband, Lemaster Carlyle, a Barbadian immigrant, is a former law professor and now president of the university. The Carlyles live with their two daughters in the small town of Tyler's Landing, which has a population of 3,000, of which only five families, including the Carlyles, are African-American; Carter describes it as the "heart of whiteness". Both Carlyles are members of secret clubs – Julia is a member of the Ladybugs, and Lemaster is a member of the Empyreals (described as a black Skull and Bones).

A former lover of Julia's, an economics professor named Kellen Zant, goes missing. The Carlyles discover Zant's body, shot twice in the head and hidden on a back road, when their car spins out of control in icy conditions. Lemaster tries to keep the murder quiet, but Julia begins to looks more closely into the circumstances.

As the murder of Zant is investigated by a campus detective and army veteran named Bruce Vallely, a link is found to a young girl named Gina Joule, who was raped and drowned in the early 1970s. The presumed murderer, a young black man named DeShaun Moton, was shot by the police before he could be arrested and questioned, and as Vallely and Julia dig into the trail of evidence it becomes clear that Zant had uncovered evidence that Gina Joule was actually killed after getting into an expensive Jaguar owned by Jonathan "Jock" Hilliman, a member of the wealthy Hilliman family, and a friend of Lemaster's in university. Along with Hilliman and Lemaster Carlyle, the other two members of the group of friends were Malcolm Whisted, a United States senator now running for the presidency, and a man referred to only by his nickname, "Scrunchy", who is the current President of the United States of America. Although Jock Hilliman died in the 30 years between then and now, it seems that Zant was killed to prevent the truth being unveiled.

== Development history ==
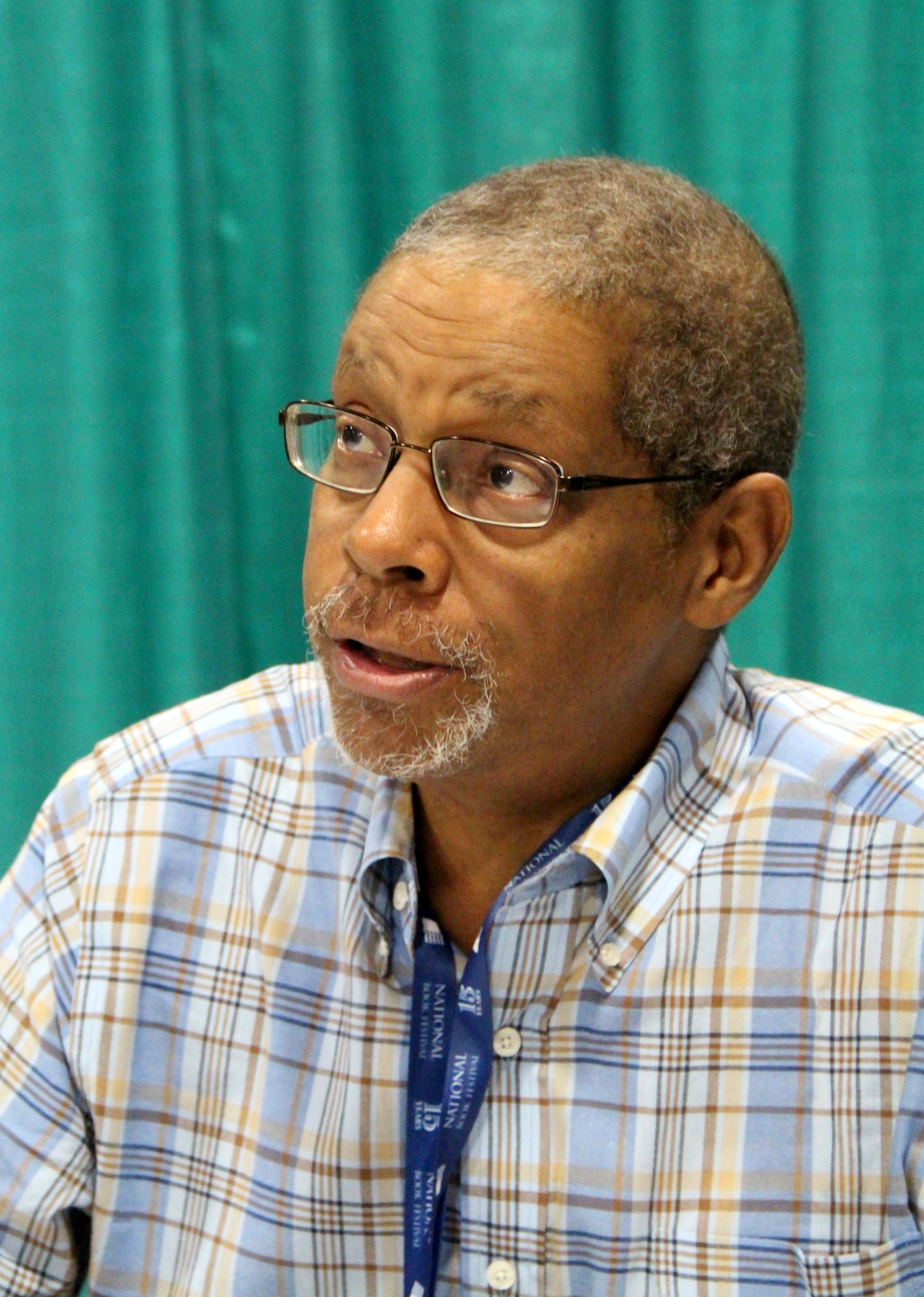
Author Stephen L. Carter in 2015

Following a fierce bidding war in early 2001 between American publishers Knopf, sister publisher Random House, and others, Carter was given one of the largest advances ever received by a first-time author of fiction from Knopf for the rights to publish his first two books, of $4.2 million, which included any adaptation rights. The first book, The Emperor of Ocean Park, was released in 2002.

Carter noted that the text of New England White contained a number of homages to various writers, including one to Ralph Ellison. As a professor of Law at Yale University, Carter's background in law and academia is reflected heavily throughout the book.

Despite writing the novel using what was ostensibly a simple murder-mystery (or even a "potboiler") structure, Carter shied away from straightforward trope characters, believing that all the characters should be complex, and their motives should not be all entirely straightforward or pure.

=== Publication history ===
The hardcover version of New England White was released in the United States on June 26, 2007, published by Knopf, a division of Random House. An initial run of 300,000 copies was printed. The paperback was released in the US on May 27, 2008.

A 22.5-hour-long audiobook version was released in July 2007, narrated by Bahni Turpin; one reviewer felt that while Turpin's performance reflecting Julia Carlyle's viewpoint was praised, the complexity of much of the passages led to the conclusion that it was better experienced in book form; an abridged 7-hour version was also released, again read by Turpin, which was better received.

== Major themes ==
The Carlyles were minor characters in Carter's previous novel, The Emperor of Ocean Park. As in The Emperor of Ocean Park, Carter draws much attention to the topic of race, and how it influences power and privilege. Word games play a prominent part in the narrative, and these, along with various economic theories form a framing device between chapters and sections of the novel, much like chess theory was used in The Emperor of Ocean Park.

The evolution of Julia Carlyle's personality through the course of the novel is seen as significant, with the "compliant and weak" character at the start becoming stronger, and solving the mystery. In an interview with John Freeman, Carter said that "Julia was raised a certain way, with a certain understanding of what's important, and all her life has been kicking against the strictures that have been placed on her".

Writing for Books & Culture, Gerald L. Early discussed the frequent reprisals of the racial themes Carter referenced in his previous work, particularly around the relatively unusual literary setting (for a mainstream novel) in the world of privileged black people, drawing parallels with the work of W. E. B. Du Bois around the concept of a "Talented Tenth" – an elite leadership class of African-Americans. The book uses the style of genre fiction to raise many of Carter's views on race, and in particular the differences between what he calls the 'paler nation' and the 'darker nation'.

== Literary significance and reception ==
Much of the literary reception for New England White focused on comparisons to The Emperor of Ocean Park. Writing for The New Yorker, Joyce Carol Oates said that the novel lacked the "vigor, intensity, and air of authenticity of its predecessor", and noted that the chief protagonist, Julia Carlyle, was less effective as a narrator due to her lack of resentment when compared to Tal Garland, the narrator of The Emperor of Ocean Park. She described the character of Kellen Zant as having "so little gravitas that the quest to find his murderer lacks urgency", and also criticized the ending of the novel, which she found improbable. The ending of the book was criticized somewhat, with one critic likening it to a "bad 24 episode", with each of the closing chapters ending in cliffhangers, and another noting that the previously genteel Julia Carlyle suddenly ends up in a shoot-out.

January Magazine also compared New England White to its predecessor, but more positively, and particularly praised Carter's skill with coming up with realistic and inventive names for his characters, bringing life to the communities he describes, drawing parallels with Stephen King. It was noted that the basic plot of New England White mirrors that of The Emperor of Ocean Park – a suspicious death occurs, a cryptic clue is revealed which points to a document that could unveil the truth behind the death, and a hotly contested race to decode the clue(s) takes place; it was further noted that this plot structure is repeated in Carter's next two works, Palace Council and Jericho's Fall. In a review for the African-American Literature Book Club, critic Kam Williams noted the improvement in Carter's writing in New England White, with a reduction in the excessive verbiage which Williams felt was an issue in The Emperor of Ocean Park.

Kirkus Reviews described the novel as a "beefy, neatly constructed melodrama which distributes clues and juggles suspects with Grisham-like energy and efficiency" and stated that "Carter strikes again". Trade magazine Publishers Weekly predicted that the book would be another bestseller, due to the "richness of [Carter's] characters, both major and minor, and the intelligence of his writing".

== Awards and nominations ==
Awards:

- 2008 BCALA Literary Award, from the Black Caucus of the American Library Association

Nominations:

- 2008 NAACP Image Award for Outstanding Literary Work, Fiction
