= Hortense "Tee" Beveridge =

American film editor and director

Hortense "Tee" Beveridge (1923-1993) was an American film editor and director. She is an important figure in the post-World War II African-American documentary scene, which was characterized as being progressive and socially conscious.

== Early life and education ==
Hortense Beveridge was born on October 3, 1923, in the Harlem neighborhood of New York City. Her mother, Rachel Sie (née Hall), was a domestic worker, and she was part of the First Great Migration, moving to New York from Virginia and Maryland in the early 1920s. In 1924, Rachel married Thorgues Sie, who was born in Liberia and had moved to Baltimore to study at what is now Morgan State University. Beveridge's father, Thorgues Sie, was one of the small number of Liberians living in New York in the 1920s and 1930s, and he opened the Sie household up to act as a meeting place for Liberian expatriates and other students from Africa. The two of them had two children: Hortense and her younger brother, Thorgues Jr., who was born in 1942, but their relationship dissolved when Thorgues returned to Liberia in 1947.

Beveridge attended Erasmus Hall High School in the Flatbush neighborhood of Brooklyn and subsequently George Washington Irving High School in Manhattan. Around 1947, Beveridge was admitted to Hunter College where she majored in social work. At the college, Beveridge integrated herself into leftist political and student social justice organizations, which included the Communist Party and the National Association for the Advancement of Colored People (NAACP), and she also became a mentee of the Committee for the Negro in the Arts (CNA), which acted as her formal film education. Additionally, the CNA was where Beveridge would become acquainted with her eventual longtime collaborator and fellow female film editor Peggy Lawson, as well as other contemporary leftist documentarians. Around this time, she earned a mention in the City College of New York student newspaper as a progressive leader.

In September 1949, she attended the congress of the International Union of Students (IUS) in Sofia, Bulgaria, as the executive secretary for the Committee for International Student Cooperation. In the fall of 1949, Beveridge visited Hungary, Bulgaria, and the Soviet Union, after which she returned to school and her job at the communist Worker's Book Store. Tee ended up joining the Communist Party and becoming active in the Labor Youth League and other radical political student organizations. Around 1951, Beveridge attended two semesters of night school film classes at New York University.

== Career ==
Due to her political activism in the late 1940s, Beveridge eventually joined the Council on African Affairs (CAA), thus allowing her to merge her political activities with her filmmaking skills. This allowed her to direct and edit her first known complete film, South Africa Uncensored (1951), which acted as a harsh critique against apartheid; the film was distributed by the CAA.

Beveridge also worked on television advertisements in the New York television and film industry and sponsored films for progressive African-American organizations. On November 25, 1952, Hortense Beveridge applied to the Local 771 for Motion Picture Film Editors, and on June 17, 1953, she became the first Black woman to be admitted to the union. Over the course of the following seven years, Beveridge worked her way up in the union, initially working for television film advertising production houses. On January 1, 1954, Beveridge was promoted to the union rank of assistant editor at Tempo Productions, and by December 1957, she had started a trial period for editorship at MPO Television Films, eventually becoming a full editor in March 1958. In this position, Beveridge worked on the 1959 film Ages of Time.

By 1954, Beveridge and her husband had moved Harlem to Crown Heights, and in the mid- to late 1950s, Beveridge used her home in Brooklyn as a refuge for those in need, which included her provided meals and shelter to various people. Their home eventually transformed into a regular meeting spot for New York progressives, which included students from West Africa, civil rights activists on leave from Freedom Summer, refugees from South Africa, members of the African National Congress, and various diplomats from African missions. Beveridge used her salary from her job as an editor as well as her access to professional editing facilities to aid independent filmmakers.

== Personal life ==
Beveridge's husband, Lowell "Pete" Beveridge, would often photograph her.

== Filmography ==
Year	Title	Contribution	Notes
1949	Harlem Trade Union Council Convention, 1949	Director	4 min, 16mm
c. 1950	Editing Exercises	Editor	3 min, 16mm
c. 1951	Santa Paul Robeson	Director	2 min, 16mm
1952	Sojourners for Truth and Justice, 1952	Director	8 min, 16mm
1952	South Africa Uncensored	Director and editor	22 min, 16mm
1959	Ages of Time	Editor	16 min, 16mm
1959	NAACP Brooklyn Rally (May 19, 1959)	Director	11 min, 16mm
c. 1962	Hands of Inge	Editor	10 min, 16mm
c. 1966	Bedford-Stuyvesant Youth in Action	Director and editor	100 min, 16mm
1968	'Bullitt': Steve McQueen's Commitment to Reality	Editor	10 min, 16mm
1968	Jeanette Rankin Brigade	Co-director and editor	8 min, 16mm
1968	The Moviemakers	Co-director and editor	7 min, 16mm
1968	The New-Ark	Editor	25 min, 16mm
1968	Vienna: The Years Remembered	Editor	9 min, 16mm
1968	The World Premiere of 'Finian's Rainbow'	Editor	26 min, 16mm
1970	On Location with "The Owl and the Pussycat"	Editor	6 min, 16mm
1971	Morris	Editor	10 min, 16mm
1973	Martin Scorsese: Back on the Block	Editor	7 min, 16mm
1974	Honeybaby, Honeybaby	Editor	89 min, 35mm
1974	Promises to Keep	Editor	19 min, 16mm
1976	Eastwood in Action	Editor	7 min, 16mm
1976	Redd Foxx Becomes a Movie Star	Editor	8 min, 16mm
1979	Natural Enemies	Assistant editor	100 min, 35mm
1980	Happy Birthday, Gemini	Co-editor	111 min, 35mm
1981	"Fundi": The Story of Ella Baker	Editor	63 min, 35mm
