= Honeybaby, Honeybaby =

Honey baby, Honey baby
- Theatrical release poster
- Directed by: Michael Schultz
- Written by: Brian Phelan
- Starring: Diana Sands; Calvin Lockhart
- Cinematography: Andreas Bellis
- Edited by: Hortense Beveridge
- Music by: Michael Tschudin
- Production companies: Heritage Enterprises Inc. Kelly/Jordan Enterprises
- Distributed by: Kelly/Jordan Enterprises
- Release date: January 15, 1974
- Running time: 90 minutes
- Country: United States
- Language: English

Honey baby, Honey baby is a 1974 American action film directed by Michael Schultz. The film focuses on the adventures of Laura Lewis, a young woman from Harlem known as "Honey Baby" (Diana Sands), who wins a game show trip to Beirut, Lebanon. While on this trip, she and her cousin Skiggy (J.Eric Bell) get in trouble after she encounters a Chinese woman named Madame Chan (Gay Suilin), who, unknown to Laura and Skiggy, implants a dot with the secret formula of a deceased prince's body in Honey Baby's purse. Consequently, mercenaries track Honey Baby to get the formula back.

The film was also released in the United States under a variety of alternate titles such as, "Honeybaby, Honeybaby", "Honeybaby", and "Three Days in Beirut".

== Plot ==
The film follows "Honey Baby" on her trip to Beirut where she is hunted down by a variety of people seeking a micro dot from her, which was planted on her by Madame Chan and contains a sought-after secret formula. Honey Baby's role as a target becomes evident once she is approached by an African man who is inquiring about the disappearance of Madame Chan, and murdered shortly after. Honey Baby then meets a man named "Liv" (Calvin Lockhart) who she proceeds to go on a date with. Liv's ulterior motive is revealed at the conclusion of their date as he confesses to his interest in the disappearance of Madame Chan, despite enjoying Honey Baby's company.

Amidst driving home from their date, Liv's car is chased by multiple men in an attempt to assassinate Honey Baby. Upon reaching a dead-end, Honey Baby is involved in a shootout as Liv gives her a gun with instructions to 'run like hell'. Following the shootout, Madame Chan's missing body is put into Honey Baby's closet by "Makuba" (Head of the Operations).

The next day, Honey Baby begins to face different pressures from the producer of the game show, Sam (Seth Allen), who wants to constantly shoot her "having fun" to show the viewers back home. He even suggests that "if we get you in a pants suit, on a horse, and put you in an Afro hairdo we got something" as a solution to re-brand her. Honey Baby rejects this because she just wants to be herself and doesn't want to change. However, she does eventually agree to go on a live game show to continue her trip to Lebanon. She is to be filmed sitting on a ski lift over Lebanon. Before the show can begin, an assassin cuts the rope steadying her, causing her to speed down the line and almost die on National Television.

In the end, Laura reveals that the guy that everyone believes to be Makuba is actually General Christian Awani (Thomas Baptiste) and he kidnapped the real Makuba to steal his identity and obtain the secret formula of the dead prince's body. As revenge for constantly trying to kill her, Honey Baby locks Awani in the Prince's castle in order for him to be arrested when the police arrive.

== Cast ==
- Diana Sands as Laura Lewis / "Honey Baby"
- Calvin Lockhart as "Liv"
- Seth Allen as Sam
- Bricktop as Harry's Mother
- J. Eric Bell as "Skiggy" Lewis
- Thomas Baptiste as General Christian Awani

== Soundtrack ==
A1	'Titles And Openings' Clavinet – Weldon Irvine Trumpet – Blood Hollins* Written-By – Michael Tschudin	6:12
A2	'Honey Baby Theme' Clavinet – Weldon Irvine Trumpet – Blood Hollins* Vocals – Friends Of Distinction* Written-By – Michael Tschudin	3:47
A3	'(A Song For Diana) Hey, Hey Star' Vocals – Friends Of Distinction*, Zulema Written-By – Carl L. Maults	5:33
B1	'Just Can't Say Goodbye' Vocals – Zulema Written-By – Michael Tschudin	3:34
B2	'Salt Chase' Trumpet – Blood Hollins* Written-By – Michael Tschudin	3:21
B3	'Baalbeck' Written-By – Michael Tschudin	0:48
B4	'Nowhere' Congas, Percussion – Richard Powell Drums, Percussion – Brian Grice Piano – Carl L. Maults-By Soloist, Bass – Francisco Centeno Soloist, Electric Piano [Fender Rhodes] – Nat Adderley Jr.Soloist, Guitar – Bradley Bobo Vocals – Friends Of Distinction*, Tender Loving Care Written-By – Carl L. Maults	4:30
B5	'Honey Baby Theme (Instrumental)' Written-By – Michael Tschudin	2:46

=== Credits ===
- Art direction – Dick Smith (9)
- Artwork – Katrina Taylor (2)
- Bass – Francisco Centeno
- Clavinet – Weldon J. Irvine*
- Drums – Brian O. Grice*
- Electric Piano – Nathaniel Adderley Jr.*
- Flute – Harald Milton Jones*, Philip L. Bodner*, William Slapin
- French Horn – Brooks Tillotson, James Buffington*, Peter Gordon (8)
- Guitar – Bradley Bobo
- Harp – Margaret Ross
- Percussion – David Carey, Richard V. Powell*
- Performer [Tender Loving Care] – Deirdre Tuck, Jocye Tuck, Renelle Stafford
- Piano [Pianoforte] – Carl Maults-By*
- Producer, Arranged By, Adapted By, Conductor – Carl Maults-By*
- Recorded By, Mixed by – Dick Baxter
- Saxophone – Frank Wess, Seldon Powell
- Strings – Alan Shulman, Alfred Brand, Charles Libove, Emanuel Green, Emanuel Vardi, George Ricci, Harry Cykman, Harry Lookofsky, Harry Zaratzian, Joe Malin, Joseph Malignacci*, Julien C. Barber*, Kermit Moore, Lewis Eley, Max Ellen, Max Pollikoff, Paul Gershman, Selwart Richard Clarke*, Theodore Israel
- Strings, Concertmaster – Gene Orloff
- Trombone – Garnett Brown, Paul Faulise, Wayne J. Andre*
- Trumpet, Flugelhorn – Ernest Royal*, Blood Hollins*, Raymond Crisara*
- Vocals – Friends Of Distinction*, Tender Loving Care, Zulema

== See also ==
- List of American films of 1974
