= Diana Sands =

American actress (1934–1973)

- Photograph of Sands in Julia, 1970
- Born: Diana Patricia Sands; August 22, 1934; New York City, U.S.
- Died: September 21, 1973 (aged 39); New York City, U.S.
- Resting place: Ferncliff Cemetery, Hartsdale, New York, U.S.
- Education: High School of Performing Arts Arts
- Occupation: Actress
- Years active: 1953–1973
- Known for: Beneatha Younger – A Raisin in the Sun
- Spouse: Lucien Happersberger (m. 1964; div. 1966)
- Partner(s): Kurt Baker (1972–1973)

Diana Patricia Sands (August 22, 1934 – September 21, 1973) was an American actress, perhaps most known for her portrayal of Beneatha Younger, the sister of Sidney Poitier's character, Walter, in the original stage and film versions of Lorraine Hansberry's A Raisin in the Sun (1959).

Sands also appeared in a number of dramatic television series in the 1960s and 1970s such as Dr. Julia Harrison in the 1964 Outer Limits episode "The Mice", the 1965-1968 series I Spy, as Davala Unawa in the 1967 The Fugitive episode "Dossier on a Diplomat", and the 1968 series Julia. Sands also starred in the 1963 film An Affair of the Skin as the narrator and photographer, Janice. She was twice nominated for a Tony Award and twice nominated for an Emmy Award.

== Biography ==
=== Early life and education ===
Diana Patricia Sands was born one of three children in the Bronx, New York City, on August 22, 1934, to Rudolph Sands, a Bahamian carpenter, and Shirley (née Thomas), a milliner. Having attended elementary school in Elmsford, New York, she enrolled in 1949 at the Music & Art High School (now known as Fiorello H. LaGuardia High School), where she was a classmate of Diahann Carroll and Billy Dee Williams. While there, Sands received her first role in a school production of George Bernard Shaw's Major Barbara. After graduating in 1953, she began her professional career as a dancer, touring with a traveling carnival.

=== Career ===
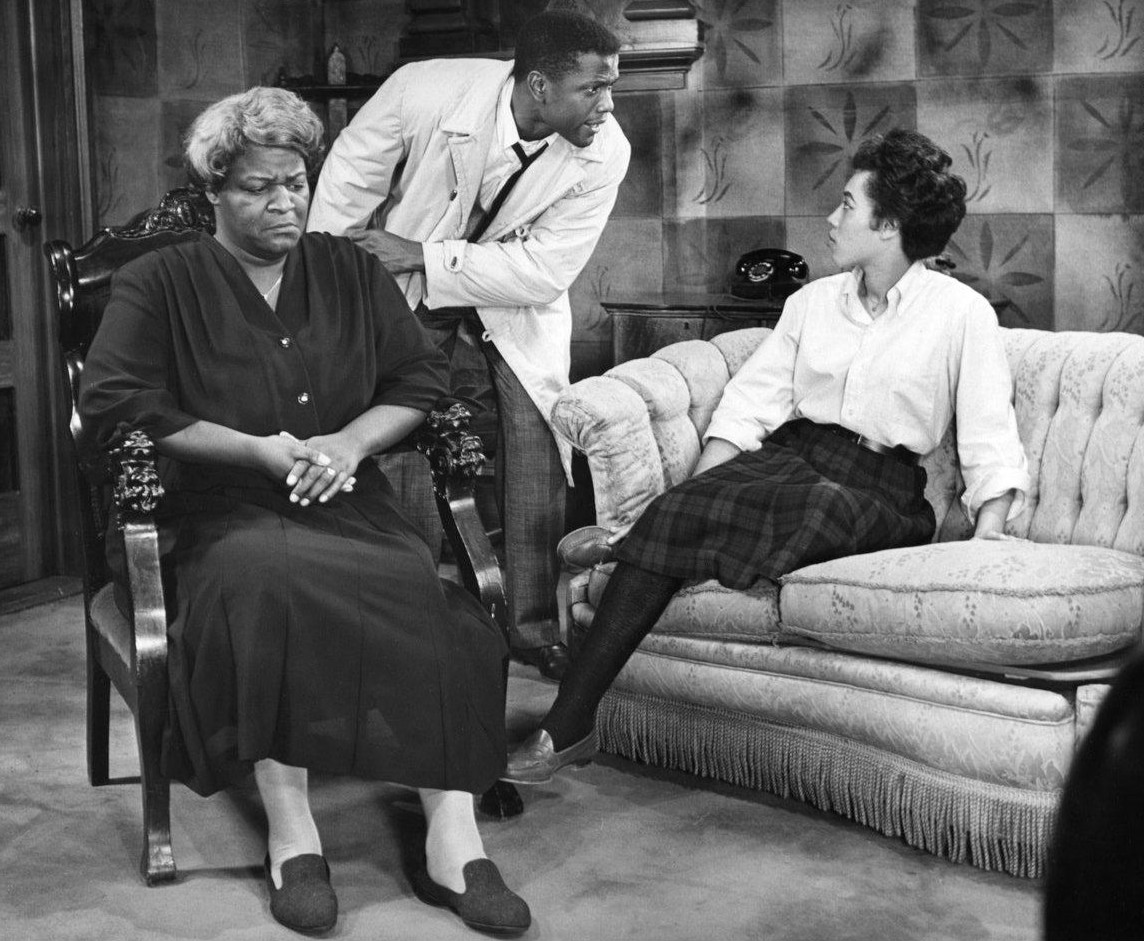
As Beneatha Younger with Claudia McNeil and Sidney Poitier in the Broadway version of A Raisin in the Sun, 1959.

In 1959, Sands landed the role of Beneatha Younger in the Broadway production of Lorraine Hansberry's A Raisin in the Sun. Two years later, she co-starred alongside Claudia McNeil, Sidney Poitier and Ruby Dee in the film version of the play. Sands later became a member of the Actors Studio.

In 1964, she was in the first production of James Baldwin's Blues for Mister Charlie; her performance was noted as a highlight of the show. Later the same year she starred opposite Alan Alda in the original Broadway production of The Owl and the Pussycat, gaining a Tony Award nomination for Best Actress in a Leading Role. The show ran for a year, after which she spent much of 1966 starring in the play's London production, playing this time opposite Anton Rodgers.

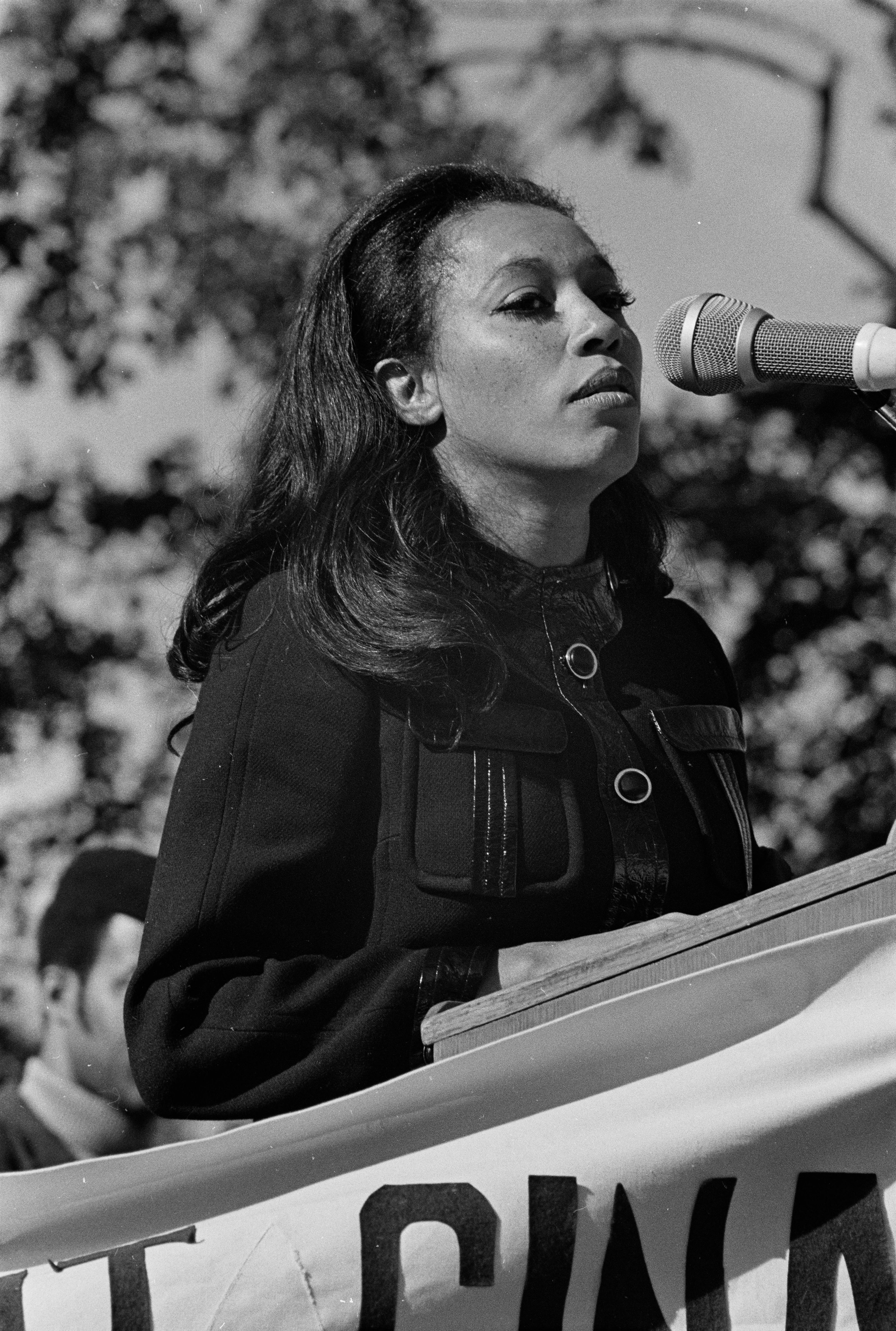
Sands gives a speech at the Moratorium to End the War in Vietnam in New York City, October 15, 1969

In 1970, Sands co-starred in the film The Landlord, subsequently appearing in Doctors' Wives and Georgia, Georgia. During this time, Sands met musician Bob Dylan, who, in his memoirs, called her "an electrifying actress who I might have been secretly in love with." During the fall of 1972, Sands filmed Honeybaby, Honeybaby on location in Beirut, Lebanon, co-starring Calvin Lockhart. According to Lockhart, Sands went to a local hospital during the filming, knowing that she was already seriously ill. Also in 1972, Sands was engaged to provide a track for the Original New York Cast album of Free to Be... You and Me. However, she had died by the time the ABC Afterschool Special began production, and her previously recorded vocal track wasn't used.

In early 1973, Sands appeared in Willie Dynamite, a blaxploitation film co-starring Roscoe Orman. In late August, she began filming Claudine alongside James Earl Jones in the Harlem section of New York City. According to October 1973 articles published in Jet, Sands collapsed a week into filming and was rushed to a local hospital in early September. During surgery, doctors discovered a cancerous growth in Sands' abdomen, which was diagnosed as pancreatic cancer. Due to her aggressive illness, Sands was unable to continue and suggested that her longtime friend Diahann Carroll replace her; the film's producers agreed and cast Carroll.

== Personal life ==
Sands was married once and had no children. From October 1964 until 1966, she was married to Swiss artist Lucien Happersberger. At the time of her death, Sands was engaged to Kurt Baker, who was an assistant film director.

== Death ==
On September 21, 1973, Sands died of leiomyosarcoma at Memorial Sloan-Kettering Hospital in New York City, aged 39. Sands' Funeral Mass was held on October 5, 1973, at St. Catherine of Siena Church in Manhattan, New York. Afterwards, she was buried at Ferncliff Cemetery and Mausoleum in Hartsdale, New York.

== Legacy ==
In 1976, Junior High School 147, located in the Bronx, New York, was named in Sands' honor.

== Selected credits ==
=== Theatre ===
Year	Production	Role	Theatre(s)	Notes
1969	The Gingham Dog		John Golden Theatre	
1968	Saint Joan	Joan	Vivian Beaumont Theater	
1968	Tiger at the Gates	Cassandra	Vivian Beaumont Theater	
1968	We Bombed in New Haven	Ruth	Ambassador Theatre	
1965	The Premise		The Premise	Improvisational theatre with material by the performers.
1964	Blues for Mister Charlie	Juanita	ANTA Playhouse	Tony Award nomination, Best Featured Actress in a Play
1964	The Owl and the Pussycat	Doris W.	ANTA Playhouse; Royale Theatre	Tony Award nomination, Best Actress in a Play
1963	The Living Premise			Obie Award, Distinguished Performance
1962	Tiger, Tiger Burning Bright	Adelaide Smith	Booth Theatre	Theatre World Award
1959	A Raisin in the Sun	Beneatha Younger	Ethel Barrymore Theatre; Belasco Theatre	Outer Critics Circle Award, Best Drama Performance

== Partial filmography ==
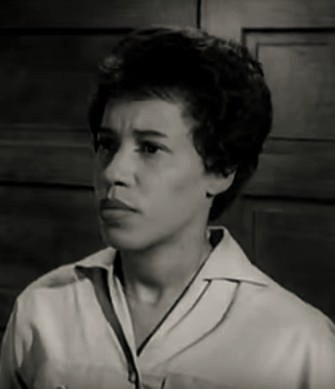
Sands in the trailer to A Raisin in the Sun (1961)

- Caribbean Gold (1952) - Native Woman (uncredited)
- Four Boys and a Gun (1957) - (uncredited)
- A Face in the Crowd (1957) - Homeless Black Woman (uncredited)
- Carib Gold (1957)
- Odds Against Tomorrow (1959) - Club Hostess (uncredited)
- A Raisin in the Sun (1961) - Beneatha Younger
- An Affair of the Skin (1963) - Janice
- Ensign Pulver (1964) - Mila
- The Landlord (1970) - Fanny
- Doctors' Wives (1971) - Helen Straughn
- Georgia, Georgia (1972) - Georgia Martin
- Willie Dynamite (1974) - Cora
- Honeybaby, Honeybaby (1974) - Laura Lewis (final film role)
