= Eva del Vakia Bowles =

American teacher (1875–1943)

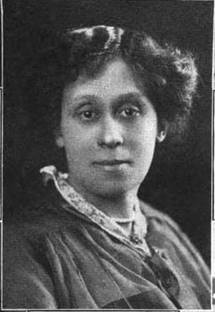
- 1918
- Born: January 24, 1875; Albany, Athens County, Ohio
- Died: June 14, 1943 (aged 68); Richmond, Virginia
- Other name: Eva D. Bowles
- Occupations: educator, social worker, organizer
- Years active: 1905–1943
- Known for: first black woman to hold the position of general secretary of the YWCA

Eva del Vakia Bowles (January 24, 1875 – June 14, 1943) was an American teacher and a Young Women's Christian Association organizer in New York City. When she began working at the New York City segregated YWCA in Harlem, she became the first black woman to be a general secretary of the organization. For eighteen years she organized black branches of the YWCA and expanded their services to community members. She received recognition from former president Theodore Roosevelt for her work during World War I on behalf of the segregated Y.

== Early life ==
Eva del Vakia Bowles was born on January 24, 1875, in Albany, Ohio to Mary Jane (née Porter) and John Hawkes Bowles. Her father was the first black principal of a school in Marietta, Ohio and later served as one of the first black railroad postal clerks in Ohio. Her paternal grandfather, John Randolph Bowles was a Baptist minister and served as the chaplain of the 55th Massachusetts Infantry Regiment during the civil war. After attending public schools in Albany, Bowles went on to continue her education at Bliss Business College in Columbus while taking summer classes at Ohio State University.

== Career ==
Bowles began her career as a teacher at several black colleges: Chandler Normal School in Lexington, Kentucky; St. Augustine's College of Raleigh, North Carolina, and St. Paul's School in Lawrenceville, Virginia. In 1905, while she was teaching in Virginia, Bowles was approached by Addie Waites Hunton, whose husband William was secretary of the Colored Young Men's Christian Association (YMCA) of Harlem. Hunton recruited Bowles to spearhead a project for the sister project, the YWCA association of New York, to address the needs of black women. When she took up the post, later that year, Bowles became the first black woman employed as a YWCA secretary in the United States. In 1908, she studied social work at Columbia University in the school of philanthropy.

After her studies, Bowles became a caseworker at the Associated Charities of Columbus, Ohio between 1908 and 1912. She returned to New York in 1913 to serve as secretary on the national board of the YWCA's Subcommittee for Colored Work. Bowles was charged with increasing services to black women. Despite segregation, she proposed that each town have only one "Y", as typically white branches had better access to funding and facilities. While it made black branches subordinate to white women's direction and barred them from many of the facilities, Bowles was convinced that the structure would give women of both races the opportunity to work together. During World War I, the YWCA provided funds to further expand services in the black communities and open industrial work centers, as well as recreational facilities. They also opened fifteen canteens, facilities to provide entertainment for soldiers and their families. Bowles recruitment was so successful that she increased the black staff from one to over sixty and was awarded $4,000 with an accommodation for her work from former president Theodore Roosevelt from his Nobel Prize funds.

Bowles continued to press the national board for more representation of black women at the local and national levels. In 1924, they gained the first representative on the national board and she was also successful in increasing the headquarter's black staff to nine members with three black field workers. She traveled the country opening YWCA branches and also pressed for the organization to expand their work in Africa and the Caribbean. In 1932, she resigned from the YWCA, having become disillusioned with their reorganization plans. Bowles had already been working for the National Colored Merchants Association, as association secretary, and the National Negro Business League, as chair of the women's auxiliary. When she left the YWCA, she joined their joint offices as an employee to help improve the economic opportunities of blacks. In 1943, at the onset of World War II, Bowles was named executive director of Civilian Defense for the Harlem and Riverside areas of New York City.

== Death and legacy ==
Bowles died June 14, 1943, at the Richmond Community Hospital in Richmond, Virginia, while on a visit to see her niece. The archives of the YWCA contain materials concerning Bowles work to expand the YWCA in the African American communities as well as her work during the First World War.
