= Herbert Berghof =

American actor (1909–1990)

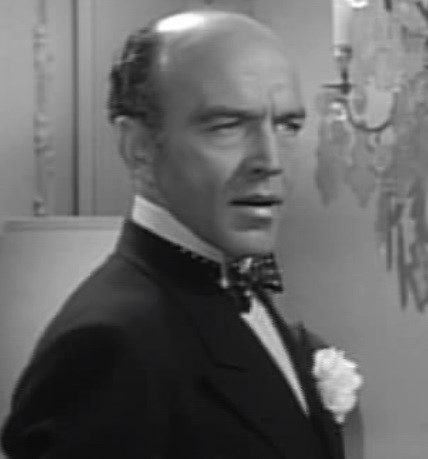
- Berghof in Five Fingers (1952)
- Born: September 13, 1909; Vienna, Austria-Hungary
- Died: November 5, 1990 (aged 81); New York City, U.S.
- Occupation: Actor
- Years active: 1945–1990
- Spouse: Uta Hagen (m. 1957)
- Website: hbstudio.org

Herbert Berghof (September 13, 1909 – November 5, 1990) was an American actor, director and acting teacher.

== Early life ==
Berghof was born in Vienna, then part of Austria-Hungary, to Jewish parents. He studied acting there with Max Reinhardt. In 1939, he moved to New York where he launched a career as an actor and director on Broadway, and worked with Lee Strasberg. Berghof became a charter member of the Actors Studio in 1947, with classmates including Marlon Brando, Montgomery Clift, Jerome Robbins, and Sidney Lumet.

== Career ==
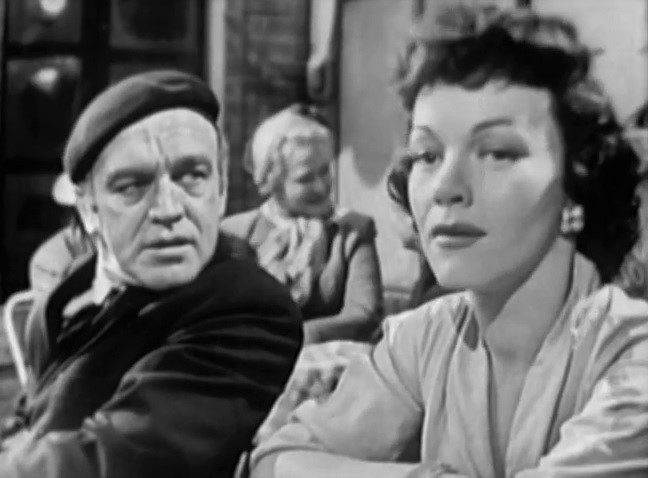
Berghof and Maria Riva in the Suspense episode "Death Drum" (1952)

In 1945, he co-founded HB Studio (the Herbert Berghof Studio) in New York City, as a place where aspiring actors could train and practice. In 1948, Uta Hagen joined the Studio as Berghof's artistic partner, and they married in 1957. They ran the studio together until his death in 1990. Notable alumni included Jack Lemmon, Al Pacino, Liza Minnelli, Robert De Niro, Geraldine Page, Fritz Weaver, Anne Bancroft, Donna McKechnie and Matthew Broderick. Despite being a charter member of the Actors Studio, he differed "with those colleagues who expounded the Method technique when his approach shifted to an emphasis on actions rather than thoughts and reactions."

Stage appearances by Berghof included roles in Ibsen's The Lady from the Sea (1950), The Andersonville Trial (1959). Among his film appearances were 5 Fingers (1952), Red Planet Mars (1952), Fräulein (1958), Cleopatra (1963), An Affair of the Skin (1963), Harry and Tonto (1974), Voices (1979), Those Lips, Those Eyes (1980), Times Square (1980) and Target (1985). He directed the first Broadway production of Beckett's Waiting for Godot (1956).

== Death ==
Described by The New York Times as "one of the nation's most respected acting teachers and coaches", he died of a heart ailment on 5 November 1990 at his home in Manhattan.

== Partial filmography ==
- 5 Fingers (1952) – Col. von Richter
- Red Planet Mars (1952) – Franz Calder
- Diplomatic Courier (1952) – Arnov
- Assignment – Paris! (1952) – Prime Minister Andreas Ordy
- Studio One (1955) – Laszlo, 1 episode, "The Judge and His Hangman"
- Fräulein (1958) – Karl Angermann
- Cleopatra (1963) – Theodotos
- An Affair of the Skin (1963) – Max
- Harry and Tonto (1974) – Jacob Rivetowski
- Mastermind (1976)
- Voices (1979) – Nathan Rothman
- Those Lips, Those Eyes (1980) – Dr. Julius Fuldauer
- Times Square (1980) – Dr. Huber
- Target (1985) – Schroeder (final film role)
