= Doctors' Wives (1971 film) =

1971 film by George Schaefer

- Directed by: George Schaefer
- Screenplay by: Daniel Taradash
- Based on: Doctors' Wives by Frank G. Slaughter
- Produced by: M. J. Frankovich
- Starring: Dyan Cannon; Richard Crenna; Gene Hackman; Carroll O'Connor; Rachel Roberts; Janice Rule; Diana Sands; Cara Williams
- Cinematography: Charles Lang
- Edited by: Carl Kress
- Music by: Elmer Bernstein
- Color process: Eastmancolor
- Production company: Frankovich Productions
- Distributed by: Columbia Pictures
- Release date: February 3, 1971
- Running time: 102 minutes
- Country: United States
- Language: English

Doctors' Wives is a 1971 American drama film directed by George Schaefer and starring Dyan Cannon, Richard Crenna, Gene Hackman, Carroll O'Connor, Rachel Roberts, Janice Rule, Diana Sands and Cara Williams. It was based on a novel by Frank G. Slaughter.

The theme song, "The Costume Ball", was sung by Cass Elliot, billed in the opening credits as Mama Cass Elliot.

== Plot ==
While playing cards with her girlfriends, all of whom suspect their doctor husbands of having affairs, Lorrie Dellman volunteers to seduce each of them to find out more.

The plan backfires when Lorrie is caught in bed with Paul McGill by her husband, brain surgeon Dr. Mort Dellman, who shoots them both.

Dr. Pete Brennan is able to save McGill's life, but Lorrie is dead. Brennan is fed up with wife Amy and her migraines. He is having an affair with Helen, a nurse.

Dr. Dave Randolph is a psychiatrist. His wife, Della, is frigid. Randolph discovers that she's had a lesbian relationship with the late Lorrie.

Maggie, an alcoholic is found face-down in her swimming pool by Dr. Joe Gray, her ex-husband.

With all of their lives in turmoil, they attend Lorrie's funeral, where Helen reveals that her young son needs a brain operation. The doctors agree that Dr. Dellman is the man best suited to do the surgery, but Dellman is in jail for having shot his wife.

The district attorney, Douglas, agrees to release the surgeon for a few hours to perform the surgery, under a police guard. He is unaware that Dellman has made a deal with Lorrie's wealthy father, Jake Porter, to help him flee to Mexico as soon as the operation is done.

== Cast ==
- Dyan Cannon as Lorrie Dellman
- Richard Crenna as Dr. Peter Brennan
- Gene Hackman as Dr. Dave Randolph
- Carroll O'Connor as Dr. Joe Gray
- Rachel Roberts as Della Randolph
- Janice Rule as Amy Brennan
- Diana Sands as Helen Struaghn
- Cara Williams as Maggie Gray
- Richard Anderson as Dist. Atty. Douglas
- Ralph Bellamy as Jake Porter
- George Gaynes as Paul McGill
- John Colicos as Dr. Mort Dellman
- Marian McCargo as Elaine McGill
- Scott Brady as Sgt. Malloy
- Kristina Holland as Sybil Carter
- Anthony Costello as Mike Traynor
- Mark Jenkins as Lew Saunders
- Vincent Van Lynn as Barney Harris
- Ernie Barnes as Dr. Perfield
- Paul Marin as Dr. Deemster
- William Bramley as Dr. Hagstrom
- Jon Lormer as Elderly Doctor

== Reception ==
On the review aggregator website Rotten Tomatoes, 20% of 5 critics' reviews are positive.

== See also ==
- List of American films of 1971
