= Frank G. Slaughter =

American novelist

Frank Gill Slaughter
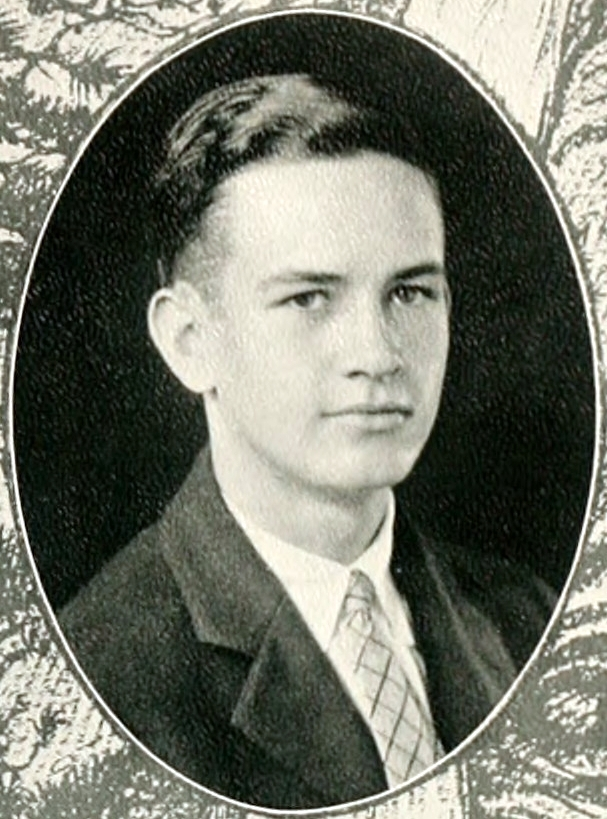
- Born: February 25, 1908; Washington DC, US
- Died: May 17, 2001 (aged 93)
- Education: Duke University Trinity College of Arts and Sciences; Johns Hopkins University
- Occupation: Physician
- Writing career
- Genres: Fiction; non-fiction

Frank Gill Slaughter (February 25, 1908 – May 17, 2001), pen-name Frank G. Slaughter, pseudonym C. V. Terry, was an American novelist and physician whose books sold more than 60 million copies. His novels drew on his own experience as a doctor and his interest in history and the Bible. Through his novels, he often introduced readers to new findings in medical research and new medical technologies.

== Biography ==
Slaughter was born in Washington, DC, the son of Stephen Lucious Slaughter and Sarah "Sallie" Nicholson Gill. When he was about five, his family moved to a farm near Berea, North Carolina. He earned a bachelor's degree from Trinity College (now Duke University) at 17 and went to medical school at the Johns Hopkins University in Baltimore, Maryland.

Slaughter began writing fiction in 1935 while a physician at Riverside Hospital in Jacksonville, Florida, paying off a $60 typewriter at $5 per month. He rewrote the manuscript of That None Should Die, a semi-autobiographical story of a young doctor, six times before Doubleday accepted it.

Several of Slaughter's novels became films, including Sangaree, made into the 1953 film of that name and Doctors' Wives, made into the 1971 film of the same name. Other books by Slaughter include The Purple Quest; Surgeon, U.S.A.; Tomorrow's Miracle; and The Scarlet Cord. Transplant, Slaughter's last novel, was published in 1987. Most of the novels credited under his C. V. Terry pseudonym were republished under his real name.

Slaughter married a former operating room nurse, Jane Mundy, in 1933. She died in 1990. They had two sons, Frank, Jr. and Randolf. Slaughter died on May 17, 2001, in Jacksonville, Florida.

William DuBois, a playwright, novelist and editor, was a silent writer with Slaughter on 27 of his historical novels.

== Books ==
=== Fiction ===
- That None Should Die (1941)
- Spencer Brade M.D. (1942)
- Battle Surgeon (1944)
- Air Surgeon (1945)
- A Touch of Glory (1945)
- In a Dark Garden (1946)
- The Golden Isle (1947)
- Sangaree (1948)
- The Divine Mistress (1949)
- The Stubborn Heart (1950)
- Fort Everglades (1951)
- The Road to Bithynia (1951)
- East Side General (1952)
- The Cross and the Crown (1953)
- Storm Haven (1953)
- The Galileans: The Story of Mary Magdalene (1953)
- The Song of Ruth (1954)
- The Healer (1955)
- Flight From Natchez (1955)
- The Scarlet Cord: A Novel of the Woman of Jericho (1956)
- The Warrior (1956)
- Sword and Scalpel (1957)
- The Mapmaker (1957)
- Daybreak (1958)
- The Crown and the Cross: The Life of Christ (1959)
- Lorena (1959)
- The Thorn of Arimathea (1959)
- The Land and the Promise: The Greatest Stories of the Bible Retold (1960)
- Pilgrims in Paradise (1960)
- The Curse of Jezebel (1961)
- Epidemic! (1961)
- David, Warrior and King (1962)
- Tomorrow's Miracle (1962)
- Devil's Harvest (1963)
- A Savage Place (1964)
- Constantine, The Miracle of the Flaming Cross (1965)
- The Purple Quest (1965)
- Doctors' Wives (1967)
- God's Warrior (1967)
- The Sins of Herod (1968)
- Upon This Rock (1968)
- Surgeon's Choice: A Novel of Medicine Tomorrow (1969)
- Countdown (1970)
- Code Five (1971)
- Convention M.D. (1972)
- Women in White (1974)
- The Stonewall Brigade (1975)
- Devil's Gamble: A Novel of Demonology (1977)
- Plague Ship (1977)
- Gospel Fever (1980)
- Doctors at Risk (1983)
- No Greater Love (1985)
- Transplant (1987)

==== As C. V. Terry (some later republished credited to Slaughter) ====
- Buccaneer Surgeon (1954)
- Darien Venture (1955)
- Buccaneer Doctor (1955)
- The Golden Ones (1957)
- The Deadly Lady of Madagascar (1959)

=== Nonfiction ===
- Immortal Magyar: Semmelweis, the Conqueror of Childbed Fever (1950)
- The New Science of Surgery (1946), retitled Science and Surgery - Perma Books (1956), credited as a completely rewritten version, published originally by Julian Messner, Inc
- Medicine for Moderns: The New Science of Psychosomatic Medicine (1947)
