= Council on African Affairs =

American organization

The Council on African Affairs (CAA), until 1941 called the International Committee on African Affairs (ICAA), was a volunteer organization founded in 1937 in the United States. It emerged as the leading voice of anti-colonialism and Pan-Africanism in the United States and internationally before Cold War anti-communism and liberalism created too much strife among members; the organization split in 1955. The split was also precipitated by co-founder Max Yergan's abandonment of left-wing politics; he advocated colonial rule in Africa.

== Founding members ==
Paul Robeson served as the CAA's chairman for most of its existence while W. E. B. Du Bois served as vice-chair and head of the Africa Aid Committee. Activist Max Yergan, who taught at the City College of New York (until 1941), was its first Executive Director. Alphaeus Hunton, an assistant professor in the English and Romance Languages department at Howard University, joined the CAA in 1943 as its Educational Director.

He was appointed as its Executive Director, after Yergan resigned. Hunton was also the editor of the CAA publication, New Africa. He was the primary force behind much of the CAA's activity and vision through the early 1950s.

Other pioneer members of the ICAA were Raymond Leslie Buell and Ralph J. Bunche. The CAA, from its beginning in 1941, received the support of mainstream activists and liberal intellectuals such as anthropologist Franz Boas, historian E. Franklin Frazier, record producer John H. Hammond, Mary McLeod Bethune (from the National Youth Administration) and Rayford Logan.

The Federal Bureau of Investigation (FBI) surveilled CAA's founding members as early as 1942.

The CAA's main donor was Frederick Vanderbilt Field.

== Goals and message ==
The Council on African Affairs articulated and promoted a fundamental connection between the struggle of African Americans and the destiny of colonized peoples in Africa, Asia and elsewhere in the world. Among a host of other campaigns, it lobbied the federal government and the United Nations and lent material support on behalf of Indian independence, striking trade unionists in Nigeria, and African famine relief. It publicized the connections between these campaigns and its larger critique of colonialism and capitalism via its monthly bulletin New Africa. The CAA's most significant work took place in relation to South Africa. It supported striking black miners and helped direct worldwide attention to the African National Congress's struggle against the Union of South Africa government and its policy of imposing racial apartheid.

== South Africa Uncensored (1951) ==
In 1951, the Council produced a half-hour agitprop documentary film about apartheid in South Africa, narrated by Paul Robeson and edited by Hortense Beveridge. The only-known copy of the film, South Africa Uncensored, is part of the Pearl Bowser Collection (2012.79.1.5.1a) was preserved by the Smithsonian's National Museum of African American History and Culture (available for stream via museum website).

== Reaction to United Nations Conference 1945 ==
Members of the CAA were hopeful that following World War II, when Western powers adopted new resolutions on the issue of colonialism, that they would encourage Third World independence under the trusteeship of the United Nations. To the CAA's dismay, the United States introduced a series of proposals at the April–May 1945 conference that set no clear limits on the length of colonialist occupation and no motions toward allowing territorial possessions to move toward self-government.

== Cold War ==
The Council on African Affairs advocated an internationalization of domestic civil rights, support for African liberation groups, and a non-aligned stance on the part of developing nations toward the Cold War superpowers. Combined with many CAA leaders' past and current associations with the Communist Party USA, this position became politically untenable by the early 1950s. The House Unamerican Activities Committee (HUAC) put great pressure on communist-affiliated organizations and activists. Liberal supporters abandoned the CAA and the federal government cracked down on its operations. In 1953, the CAA was charged with subversion under the McCarran Act. Its principal leaders, including Robeson, Du Bois, and Hunton, were subjected to harassment, indictments, and in the case of Hunton, six months' imprisonment.

Under the weight of internal disputes, government repression, and financial hardships, the Council on African Affairs disbanded in 1955. The United States government considered advocacy for the liberation of colonialist Africa as a "Communist cause" and therefore contrary to national interests during the Cold War.

Following Joseph Stalin's excesses in the Soviet Union of murdering and repressing millions, and other problems in the communist world, Max Yergan had become disillusioned with communism and spoke out against it. In 1952, he spoke against communism on a visit to South Africa. In 1964, he praised aspects of the South African government's "separate development" plan under apartheid. In the last decade of life, he co-chaired the conservative American-African Affairs Association.
