= The Culture of Disbelief =

1994 book by Stephen L. Carter

The Culture of Disbelief: How American Law and Politics Trivialize Religious Devotion
- Author: Stephen L. Carter
- Language: English
- Genre: Non-fiction
- Publication date: 1994
- Publication place: United States
- ISBN: 0-385-47498-9

The Culture of Disbelief: How American Law and Politics Trivialize Religious Devotion (ISBN 0-385-47498-9) is a 1994 book by Stephen L. Carter. In it, he holds that religion in the United States is trivialized by American law and politics, and that those with a strong religious faith are forced to bend to meet the viewpoint of a "public faith" which is largely faithless. Carter argues that there is a place for faith in public life, while still adhering to the separation of church and state.
