= Lisle C. Carter =

American administrator (1925–2009)

Lisle Carter Jr.

President of University of the District of Columbia
- In office 1977–1982

Chancellor of Atlanta University Center
- In office 1973–1977

Personal details
- Born: November 18, 1925 New York City, U.S.
- Died: September 10, 2009 (aged 83) Warrenton, Virginia, U.S.
- Spouse: Emily Elizabeth Ellis; Jane Livingston
- Children: Stephen L. Carter
- Parents: Lisle Carter Sr. (father); Eunice Carter (mother)
- Education: Dartmouth College (BA); St. John's University (LLB)
- Profession: Lawyer and educator

Lisle Carleton Carter Jr. (November 18, 1925 – September 10, 2009) was an American administrator who worked for civic organizations, educational institutions, and the federal government. He was also the first modern President of the University of the District of Columbia (UDC) following the merger of three DC universities.

== Early life and education ==
Carter was born in New York City and spent most of his childhood in Barbados. His father, Lisle Carter Sr., was a prominent Harlem dentist, and his mother, Eunice Carter, was the first black woman assistant district attorney in the state of New York. Carter graduated from high school at age 15, and from there spent two years at Cazenovia College. He later graduated from Dartmouth College in New Hampshire in 1945, then served in the Army for two years before receiving a law degree from St. John's University School of Law in New York in 1950.

== Legal, government and academic career ==
Carter was Executive Director of the Washington Urban League in the mid-1950s, and later worked for the National Urban League in New York. He entered government as a Deputy Assistant Secretary at the U.S. Department of Health, Education and Welfare under the Kennedy Administration. He later became an Assistant Director of the Office of Economic Opportunity, and then became Assistant Secretary of HEW under the Johnson Administration, becoming one of the highest-ranking African Americans in that department before leaving in 1968.

He later became a Vice President at Cornell University, and spent three years as Chancellor of the Atlanta University Center, a consortium of historically black colleges in downtown Atlanta, before becoming President of UDC in 1977.

After leaving UDC, Carter returned to practice law in Washington. He retired in the early 1990s as general counsel of the United Way.

Carter was a past board chairman of the Children's Defense Fund, a nonprofit child advocacy organization, and served on the board of the Kettering Foundation, a science, education and international and urban affairs research foundation. He was a trustee for Georgetown University, Dartmouth College, the Pension Rights Center and the Aspen Institute.

== Personal ==
Carter's first wife, Emily Elizabeth Ellis, died in 1989. In 1991, he married art historian and author Jane Livingston. Carter had five children with his first wife, one of whom is author and Yale Law professor Stephen L. Carter.

== Selected publications ==
- Carter, Lisle C. (1967–1968). "Law and the Urban Crisis". UCLA L. Rev. 15: 1135.
