= Alphaeus Hunton =

American civil rights activist (1903–1970)

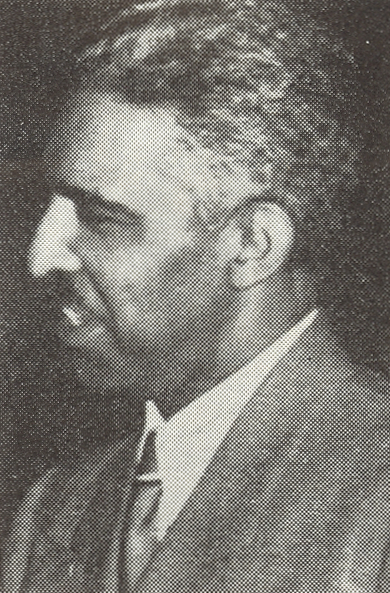
Hunton c. 1952

William Alphaeus Hunton Jr. (September 18, 1903 – January 13, 1970) was a civil rights activist. He was executive director of the Council on African Affairs.

== Life ==
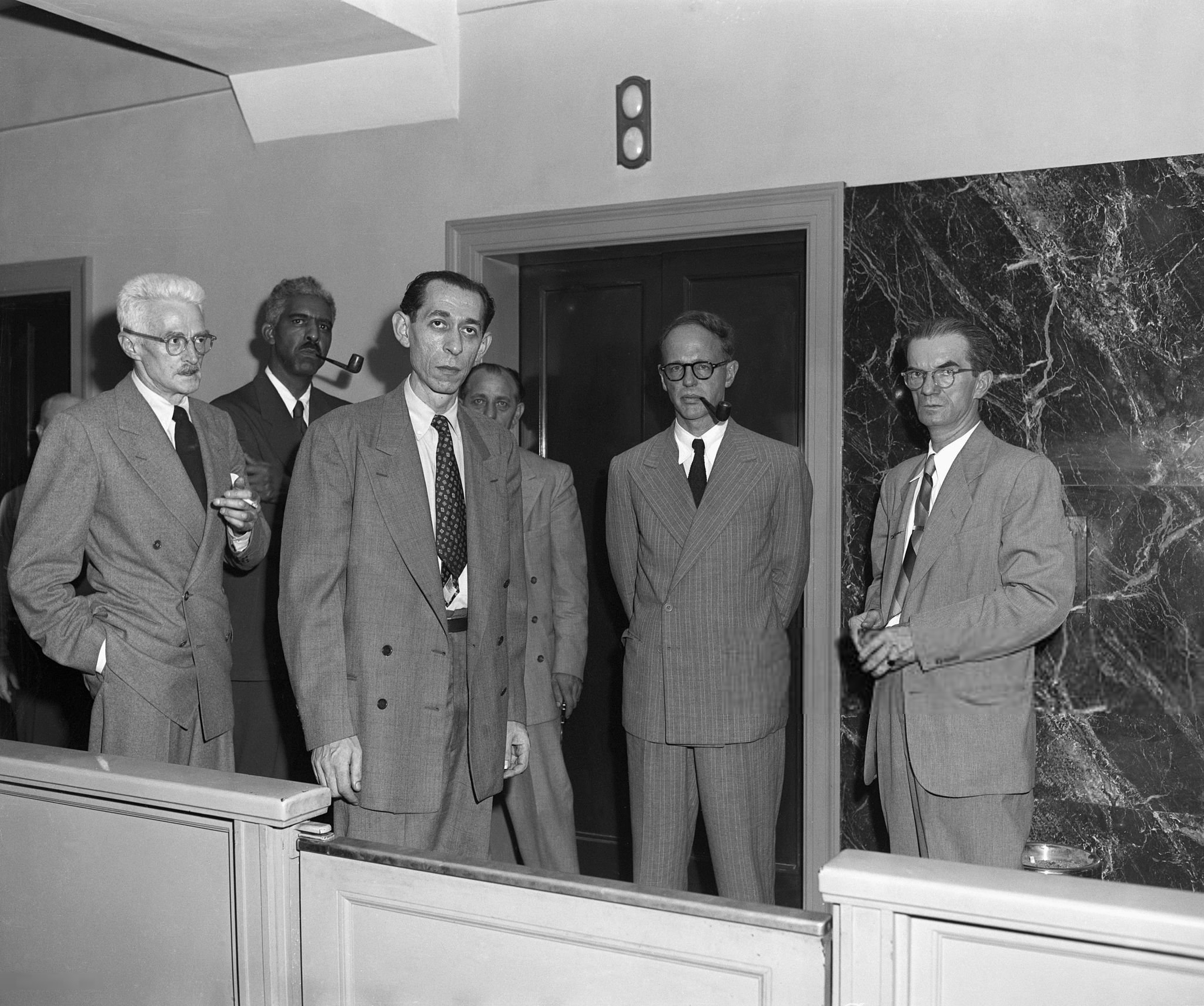
Hunton (second from left) with other arrested communist writers, July 31, 1951

He was born on September 18, 1903, in Atlanta, Georgia. His family moved to Brooklyn. He graduated from Howard University, and Harvard University. He taught at Howard University. He was a leader in the National Negro Congress. He edited New Africa, and Spotlight on Africa. He contributed to the Daily Worker and Freedom.

In 1941, he was accused of being a communist by the U.S. House of Representatives' Un-American Activities Committee. In 1943, he left Howard and joined the Council on African Affairs. In 1960 he moved to Conakry. He moved to Accra, to work with W. E. B. Du Bois, on his Encyclopedia Africana. In 1967, he moved to Lusaka. He wrote for Mayibuye. He died on January 13, 1970.

== Works ==
- Decision in Africa: Sources of Current Conflict. New York: International Publishers, 1957.
