= NAACP Image Award for Outstanding Literary Work – Fiction =

American fiction award

This article lists the winners and nominees for the NAACP Image Award for Outstanding Literary Work – Fiction. Walter Mosley holds the record for most wins in this category, with three.

== Winners and nominees ==
=== 1990s ===
Award winners: 1996, 1999
Year	Book	Author	Result	Ref.
1996	Children of the Dust	Clancy Carlile	Winner	
1999
1999	Mama Flora's Family	Alex Haley and David Stevens	Winner	

=== 2000s ===
Award winners and finalists, 2001–2009
Year	Book	Author	Result	Ref.
2001	For the Love of Money	Omar Tyree	Winner	
2002	A Day Late and a Dollar Short	Terry McMillan	Winner	
2003	Quilting the Black-Eyed Pea	Nikki Giovanni	Winner	
2003	A Love of My Own	E. Lynn Harris	Finalist	
2003	The Emperor of Ocean Park	Stephen L. Carter	Finalist	
2003	Thieves' Paradise	Eric Jerome Dickey	Finalist	
2003	The Bondswoman's Narrative	Hannah Crafts, edited by Henry Louis Gates Jr.	Finalist	
2004	Love	Toni Morrison	Winner	
2004	The Collected Poetry of Nikki Giovanni	Nikki Giovanni	Finalist	
2004	Diary of a Groupie	Omar Tyree	Finalist	
2004	A Poem Traveled Down My Arm: Poems and Drawings	Alice Walker	Finalist	
2004	The Other Woman	Eric Jerome Dickey	Finalist	
2005	Woman, Thou Art Loosed! The Novel	Bishop T. D. Jakes	Winner	
2006	Breaking the Cycle	Zane	Winner	
2006	72 Hour Hold	Bebe Moore Campbell	Finalist	
2006	Cinnamon Kiss	Walter Mosley	Finalist	
2006	Fledgling	Octavia E. Butler	Finalist	
2006	Genevieve	Eric Jerome Dickey	Finalist	
2007	Baby Brother's Blues	Pearl Cleage	Winner	
2007	After	Marita Golden	Finalist	
2007	All Aunt Hagar's Children	Edward P. Jones	Finalist	
2007	Fortunate Son	Walter Mosley	Finalist	
2007	Wizard of the Crow	Ngugi wa Thiongo	Finalist	
2008	Blonde Faith	Walter Mosley	Winner	
2008	The Brief Wondrous Life of Oscar Wao	Junot Díaz	Finalist	
2008	Cion	Zakes Mda	Finalist	
2008	Knots	Nuruddin Farah	Finalist	
2008	New England White	Stephen L. Carter	Finalist	
2009	In the Night of the Heat	Blair Underwood, Tananarive Due, and Steven Barnes	Winner	
2009	Blood Colony	Tananarive Due	Finalist	
2009	Going Down South	Bonnie Glover	Finalist	
2009	Just Too Good to Be True	E. Lynn Harris	Finalist	
2009	Song Yet Sung	James McBride	Finalist	

=== 2010s ===
Award winners and finalists, 2010–2019
Year	Book	Author	Result	Ref.
2010	The Long Fall	Walter Mosley	Winner	
2010	Basketball Jones	E. Lynn Harris	Finalist	
2010	Before I Forget	Leonard Pitts	Finalist	
2010	Life Is Short But Wide	J. California Cooper	Finalist	
2010	The Book of Night Women	Marlon James	Finalist	
2011	Getting to Happy	Terry McMillan	Winner	
2011	A Taste of Honey	Jabari Asim	Finalist	
2011	Glorious	Bernice L. McFadden	Finalist	
2011	Till You Hear from Me	Pearl Cleage	Finalist	
2011	Wench	Dolen Perkins-Valdez	Finalist	
2012	Say Amen, Again	ReShonda Tate Billingsley	Winner	
2012	Boundaries	Elizabeth Nunez	Finalist	
2012	A Silken Thread	Brenda Jackson	Finalist	
2012	Silver Sparrow	Tayari Jones	Finalist	
2012	The Plot Against Hip Hop	Nelson George	Finalist	
2013	The Reverend's Wife	Kimberla Lawson Roby	Winner	
2013	Destiny's Divas	Victoria Christopher Murray	Finalist	
2013	The Secret She Kept	ReShonda Tate Billingsley	Finalist	
2013	Silent Cry	Dywane Birch	Finalist	
2013	A Wish and a Prayer	Beverly Jenkins	Finalist	
2014	Anybody's Daughter	Pamela Samuels Young	Winner	
2014	A Deeper Love Inside: The Porscha Santiaga Story	Sister Souljah	Finalist	
2014	Little Green: An Easy Rawlins Mystery	Walter Mosley	Finalist	
2014	Never Say Never	Victoria Christopher Murray	Finalist	
2014	Who Asked You?	Terry McMillan	Finalist	
2015	A Wanted Woman	Eric Jerome Dickey	Winner	
2015	An Untamed State	Roxane Gay	Finalist	
2015	Another Woman’s Man	Shelly Ellis	Finalist	
2015	Momma: Gone	Nina Foxx	Finalist	
2015	The Prodigal Son	Kimberla Lawson Roby	Finalist	
2016	Stand Your Ground	Victoria Christopher Murray	Winner	
2016	Driving the King	Ravi Howard	Finalist	
2016	Ghost Summer: Stories	Tananarive Due	Finalist	
2016	Mama's Boy	ReShonda Tate Billingsley	Finalist	
2016	Under the Udala Trees	Chinelo Okparanta	Finalist	
2017	The Book of Harlan	Bernice McFadden	Winner	
2017	Another Brooklyn	Jacqueline Woodson	Finalist	
2017	The Illegal	Lawrence Hill	Finalist	
2017	The Mother	Yvvette Edwards	Finalist	
2017	The Underground Railroad	Colson Whitehead	Finalist	
2018	The Annotated African American Folktales	Henry Louis Gates Jr. and Maria Tatar	Winner	
2018	Little Fires Everywhere	Celeste Ng	Finalist	
2018	No One Is Coming to Save Us	Stephanie Powell Watts	Finalist	
2018	Sing, Unburied, Sing	Jesmyn Ward	Finalist	
2018	The Wide Circumference of Love	Marita Golden	Finalist	
2019	An American Marriage	Tayari Jones	Winner	
2019	Better Late Than Never	Kimberla Lawson Roby	Finalist	
2019	Black Panther: Who is the Black Panther? Prose Novel	Jesse James Holland Jr.	Finalist	
2019	Envy	Victoria Christopher Murray	Finalist	
2019	They Come in All Colors	Malcolm Hansen	Finalist	

=== 2020s ===
Award winners and finalists, 2020–present
Year	Book	Author	Result	Ref.
2020	The Revisioners	Margaret Wilkerson Sexton	Winner	
2020	New Daughters of Africa	Margaret Busby	Finalist	
2020	Out of Darkness, Shining Light	Petina Gappah	Finalist	
2020	Red at the Bone	Jacqueline Woodson	Finalist	
2020	The Water Dancer	Ta-Nehisi Coates	Finalist	
2021	The Awkward Black Man	Walter Mosley	Winner	
2021	Lakewood	Megan Giddings	Finalist	
2021	The Vanishing Half	Brit Bennett	Finalist	
2021	Riot Baby	Tochi Onyebuchi	Finalist	
2021	Black Bottom Saints	Alice Randall	Finalist	
2022	Long Division	Kiese Laymon	Winner	
2022	Harlem Shuffle	Colson Whitehead	Finalist	
2022	Libertie	Kaitlyn Greenidge	Finalist	
2022	The Man Who Lived Underground	Richard Wright	Finalist	
2022	The Perishing	Natashia Deón	Finalist	
2023	Take My Hand	Dolen Perkins-Valdez	Winner	
2023	Africa Risen: A New Era of Speculative Fiction	Natashia Deón	Finalist	
2023	Light Skin Gone to Waste	Toni Ann Johnson	Finalist	
2023	The Keeper	Tananarive Due and Steven Barnes	Finalist	
2023	You Made a Fool of Death with Your Beauty	Akwaeke Emezi	Finalist	
2024	Family Lore	Elizabeth Acevedo	Winner	
2024	Everything Is Not Enough	Lola Akinmade Åkerström	Finalist	
2024	House of Eve	Sadeqa Johnson	Finalist	
2024	The Heaven and Earth Grocery Store	James McBride	Finalist	
2024	Let Us Descend	Jesmyn Ward	Finalist	
2025	One of Us Knows: A Thriller	Alyssa Cole	Winner	
2025	A Love Song for Ricki Wilde	Tia Williams	Finalist	
2025	Grown Woman	Sarai Johnson	Finalist	
2025	Neighbors and Other Stories	Diane Oliver	Finalist	
2025	What You Leave Behind	Wanda M. Morris	Finalist	
2026	Death of the Author	Nnedi Okorafor	Winner	
2026	Can't Get Enough	Kennedy Ryan	Finalist	
2026	Chronicles of Ori: An African Epic	Harmonia Rosales	Finalist	
2026	Happy Land	Dolen Perkins-Valdez	Finalist	
2026	Harlem Rhapsody	Victoria Christopher Murray	Finalist	

== Multiple wins and nominations ==
=== Wins ===
3 wins

- Walter Mosley

2 wins

- Terry McMillan

=== Nominations ===
5 nominations

- ReShonda Tate Billingsley

4 nominations

- Walter Mosley

3 nominations

- Eric Jerome Dickey
- Terry McMillan

2 nominations

- Pearl Cleage
- Nikki Giovanni
- Bernice L. McFadden
- Victoria Christopher Murray
- Kimberla Lawson Roby
- Omar Tyree
