= The Library Thief =

2024 novel by Kuchenga Shenjé

- Author: Kuchenga Shenjé
- Language: English
- Genre: Historical fiction
- Publisher: Sphere; Hanover Square Press
- Publication date: 7 May 2024
- Publication place: England
- Pages: 352
- ISBN: 978-1-335-01332-3

The Library Thief is the 2024 debut novel of British writer Kuchenga Shenjé.

== Premise ==
The book is set in 1896 in Manchester, England. Florence Granger is the only daughter of a bookbinder, but after her father catches her having sexual intercourse, he throws her out of their home. However, she intercepts a letter from Lord Belfield, who wanted her father's help restoring his collection of rare books at Rose Hall. Granger convinces Lord Belfield to let her complete the commission instead, and stays at Rose Hall while slowly working through the restoration.

At Rose Hall, Granger finds Lord Belfield grieving over the recent death of his wife, Lady Persephone. The lady's sister-in-law was very close to her and remains in bed mourning, while Sibyl, a Black ladies' maid who was always with the lady, is missing. Lady Persephone's brother-in-law, Chester, is an angry and harsh man. Only two servants remain in the house, and they are hiding secrets. After Granger finds Lady Persephone's journal, uncovered after a house break-in, she becomes obsessed with investigating the lady's death. She eventually discovers some of the family's secrets, which include abuse and family members who are passing. While Granger remains at Rose Hall, she ponders race and gender and explores her own identity.

== Creation ==
Shenjé was inspired to create The Library Thief after watching an interview between Oprah Winfrey, Meghan Markle, and Prince Harry. In the discussion, Markle described how she had been treated by the British press after beginning her relationship with Harry. She explained that her initial idea of the media was that it would be tough but fair, but described later experiences of racialization by the media. Shenjé interpreted these experiences as "an exceedingly British brand of misogynoir". The author "wanted to tell a story that would help explain how the British became this way. The impact that colonialism had on the lives of those in the Mother Country, at a time when riches were continuing to pour in, and they were rapaciously scrambling through Africa." She also wanted to relate this history to the present by translating modern experiences of discrimination into the book's Victorian setting.

Shenjé is a Black British trans woman, whose parents are Jamaican and Zimbabwean. She was thrown out of her home for her gender nonconformity when she was seventeen, and dealt with alcoholism, recovery, and discovering her writing career. Shenjé incorporated some aspects of her own identities and experiences in the book, saying that the work was "an affirmation of my belonging." At the same time, Shenjé felt that pressured to write autobiographical fiction by the publishing industry due to their perceptions of her identity, so she wrote this novel to reflect her own interests and agency instead. She incorporated research on the intersections between the Victorian era, the British Empire, race, slavery, gender nonconformity, and industrialization.

== Publication ==
Shenjé took part in 2020 Twitter discussions about the publishing industry experiences of Black British authors, and found her agent, Silé Edwards, on that platform. Tilda Key was Shenjé's editor for The Library Thief.

Cora Kirk narrates the audiobook, using a variety of accents for different characters.

== Themes ==
One major theme of The Library Thief is politics, of memory, race, and gender. The book explores the idea of self identity, which is treated as a constructed, fluid, and discoverable object. Other themes include erasure and reclamation. Multiple characters in the novel pass as white, some intentionally and others unknowingly. Granger's interactions with Black people and interactions with white characters talking about Black people also guide the book's exploration of race and Blackness in Victorian England. Shenjé named Granger after Hermoine Granger, from Harry Potter, seeing a similarity of personality between the two. Both characters share frizzy hair as well. When Shenjé read the series as a child, she interpreted Granger as a mixed race girl, and she was surprised to discover others read her as white.

The Long Song, by Andrea Levy, had a large influence on The Library Thief. Shenjé was inspired by the way the novel uncovered and used buried histories, and she felt a personal connection to Levy as a British Jamaican writer. Shenjé has recommended stories with similar themes, including The Gilded Years by Karin Tanabe; The Personal Librarian by Marie Benedict and Victoria Christopher Murray; The Vanishing Half by Brit Bennett; and Passing by Nella Larsen.

== Reception ==
The Library Thief was positively reviewed by Mara Shatat for Library Journal. Shatat described it as a detailed gothic mystery that prioritized people of color and LGBTQIA+ love, in a rare setting for the genre. They recommended the work for readers who enjoyed writing by Sarah Waters and Bridget Collins. Keishel Williams, reviewing for NPR, praised the book's surprise ending and said that while some characters and moments were entertaining, other characters discussed race and gender roles in awkward ways. Axie Barclay, reviewing for the Chicago Book Review, gave the book three and a half stars, criticizing it for using too many plotlines and genres, while finding the protagonist's resistance against racism and misogyny compelling. Fiona Alison, reviewing for the Historical Novels Review, likewise wished the plot were tighter but enjoyed the novel's characterization of the protagonist and other characters. Good Reading gave the novel four out of five stars in their review.

The Library Thief was submitted by Soft Opening alongside the artwork of Ebun Sodipo to the art show "The Frieze Library: Volume Three, London". Sam Gordon, a gallerist with the library, picked the book as one of his ten favorites for the show. He enjoyed how the book and Sodipo's art approached the same themes. In 2024, the novel won The Transfeminine Review's Readers Choice Awards for Outstanding Historical Fiction.
