= Belle da Costa Greene =

American librarian (1879–1950)

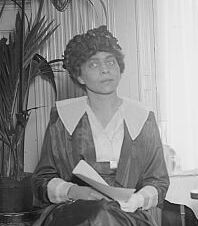
- Belle da Costa Greene
- Born: Belle Marion Greener; November 26, 1879; Washington, D.C., US
- Died: May 10, 1950 (aged 70); New York City, US
- Occupation: Librarian
- Employer(s): J. P. Morgan, Princeton University
- Father: Richard Theodore Greener

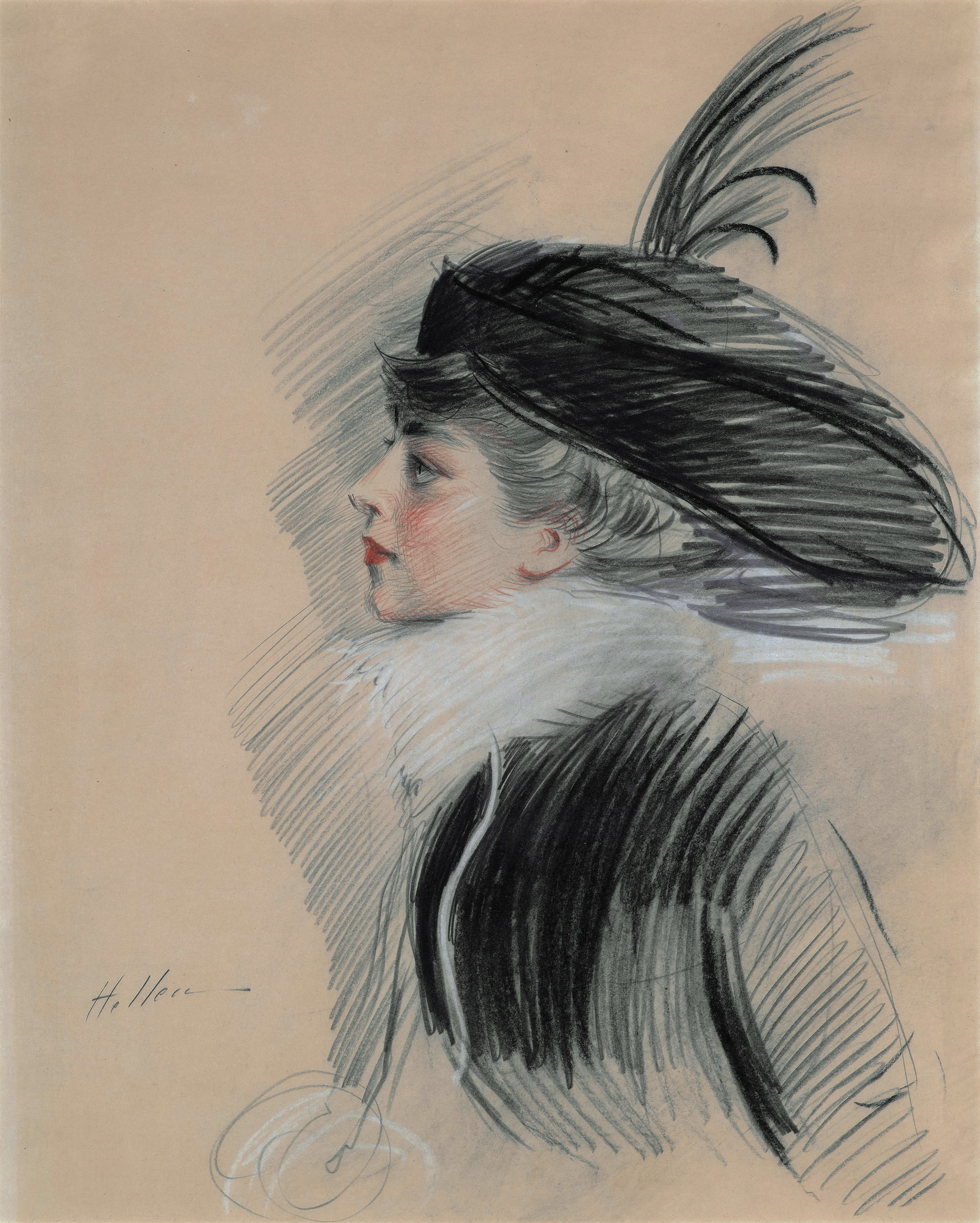
Belle da Costa Greene, pastel portrait by Paul César Helleu, ca. 1913.

Belle da Costa Greene (November 26, 1879 – May 10, 1950) was an American librarian who managed and developed the personal library of J. P. Morgan. After Morgan died in 1913, Greene continued as librarian for his son, Jack Morgan, and in 1924 was named the first director of the Pierpont Morgan Library. Born to black parents, Greene passed for white throughout her career.

Greene worked in the administrative offices at Columbia University's Teachers College in the mid-1890s, where she was introduced to the philanthropist and social welfare advocate Grace Hoadley Dodge. Dodge arranged for Greene to be admitted to the Northfield Seminary for Young Ladies and funded her education there. Greene attended the seminary for three years, likely from 1896 to 1899. In 1900, Greene attended Amherst College's Summer School of Library Economy, a six-week program that offered courses in the nascent library science field, including cataloging, indexing, and handwriting. Following her graduation, she began working at the Princeton University Library. At Princeton, she was trained in cataloging and reference work, and she developed a knowledge of rare books. While working at Princeton, she met Junius Spencer Morgan II, who later introduced her to his financier uncle J. P. Morgan. Greene began working as J. P. Morgan's librarian in 1905.

Greene was an expert in illuminated manuscripts. She spent millions of dollars in buying and selling rare manuscripts, books, and art for Morgan. She told Morgan, that her goal was to make his library "pre-eminent, especially for incunabula, manuscripts, bindings, and the classics". She was particularly focused on making rare books accessible to the public, rather than keeping them locked away in the vaults of private collectors. According to a biographer of Morgan, Greene helped Morgan in evading customs duties for art objects. At one point, she allowed customs agents to find several dutiable items in her luggage, while preventing them from noticing that she was transporting a painting, three bronzes, and a very expensive watch for Morgan. Greene herself reported that she and her employer performed a "war dance" and jointly laughed following the success of their scheme.

== Early life ==
Belle da Costa Greene was born and raised in the neighborhood of Georgetown, Washington, D.C. as Belle Marion Greener. Although her birth date is sometimes noted as December 13, 1883, her biographer Heidi Ardizzone gives Greene's birth date as November 26, 1879. Her mother was Genevieve Ida Fleet, a music teacher and member of a prominent African-American family in the upscale Northwest Quadrant of Washington, D.C. Her maternal grandfather, James H. Fleet, was an abolitionist and founding member of the Mount Zion United Methodist congregation in Georgetown, whose church served as a station of the Underground Railroad in Antebellum Washington. Her father, Richard Theodore Greener, was the first black student to attend and first black graduate of Harvard University (class of 1870). He went on to work as an attorney, professor and racial justice activist and served as dean of the Howard University School of Law.

After Greene took the job with Morgan, she likely never spoke to her father again and listed him as deceased on passport applications throughout the 1910s, though he lived until 1922. She may have met him once in Chicago around 1913, but no written records of this meeting are known. Historians have long believed that Richard Greener had lost most of his papers in the 1906 San Francisco earthquake.

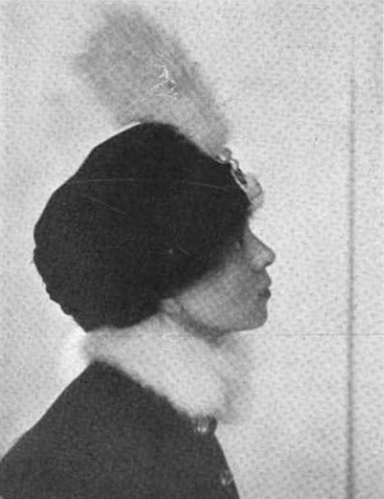
Greene in 1914

After her parents' separation, the light-skinned Belle, her mother, and her siblings passed as white and changed their surname to Greene to distance themselves from their father. Her mother changed her maiden name to Van Vliet in an effort to assume Dutch ancestry. Belle also made a change to her name, swapping out Marion for "da Costa", and claiming a Portuguese background to explain her darker complexion. The changes to her and her family's stated ancestry resulted in further fabrications, including one that led people to believe Greene had been raised in Virginia. (Note: See Notable American Women, 1607–1950 for an example of erroneous biographical details in print. The entry about Greene states that she was born on December 13, 1883, and raised in Alexandria, Virginia, by parents "Richard and Genevieve (Van Vliet) Greene".) The true nature of her background was further complicated by Greene's claim to be younger than she was, an action biographer Heidi Ardizzone describes as "a masquerade" in response to a youth-focused society in which "single women past a certain age were disdained".

== Education ==
Greene began working in the administrative offices at Columbia University's Teachers College sometime in the mid-1890s, where she was introduced to philanthropist and social welfare advocate Grace Hoadley Dodge. Dodge, impressed by Greene's work and social abilities, arranged for Greene to be admitted to the Northfield Seminary for Young Ladies and funded her education there. Greene attended the seminary for three years, likely from 1896 to 1899. In 1900, Greene attended Amherst College's Summer School of Library Economy, a six-week program that offered courses in the nascent library science field, including cataloging, indexing, and handwriting.

== Career ==
Greene began working at the Princeton University Library in 1902. It was during this time that she was trained in cataloging and reference work and developed a knowledge of rare books. While working at Princeton, she met Junius Spencer Morgan II, who later introduced her to his financier uncle J. P. Morgan. Greene began working as J. P. Morgan's librarian in 1905.

Greene's first task as a librarian was organizing, cataloging, and shelving Morgan's collection. Ada Thurston, an experienced bibliographer, contributed to the effort as Greene's assistant. Greene quickly became a gatekeeper for J.P. Morgan and those looking to seek his benefit for artistic pursuit. In 1906 the photographer and ethnographer Edward S. Curtis sought her approval for his epic project to record Native American life. After a favorable reception to his introductory letter and a personal discussion, he was granted access to J.P. Morgan himself through Greene. Over many years of correspondence, Greene continued to support his masterwork The North American Indian. 20 volumes through funding from J.P. Morgan.

By 1908, Greene had begun representing Morgan abroad. Trusted for her expertise–Greene was an expert in illuminated manuscripts–as well as her prowess in bargaining with dealers, Greene spent millions of dollars buying and selling rare manuscripts, books, and art for Morgan. She told Morgan, who was willing to pay any price for important works, that her goal was to make his library "pre-eminent, especially for incunabula, manuscripts, bindings, and the classics". In a 1912 profile of Greene, the New York Times referred to her "force of persuasion and intelligence" and recounted her pre-auction purchase of seventeen highly sought after William Caxton books on behalf of the Morgan library. She was particularly focused on making rare books accessible to the public, rather than keeping them locked away in the vaults of private collectors. She was quite successful in this; for instance, when the Morgan Library became a public institution and she was named its first director in 1924, she celebrated by mounting a series of exhibitions, one of which drew a record 170,000 people. In a history of American art auctions, Greene was described as having a "a wild, gay humor", distinguishing her from Morgan's more serious demeanor.

Morgan's biographer Jean Strouse offered an example of the relationship between Morgan and Greene: "Morgan hated paying customs duties, especially on art objects, and, like countless of other travelers before and since, evaded them whenever possible. He quickly enlisted Greene as an ally in tax evasion. One year she managed, by artfully letting the customs agents find several dutiable items of hers in her luggage, to draw their attention away from a painting, three bronzes, and a very expensive watch he had asked her to buy in London. 'When I landed at the library with all of JP's treasures ...,' she reported to a friend, 'well he & I did a war dance & laughed in great glee.'"

After Morgan died in 1913, Greene continued working for his son and daughter-in-law, J. P. Morgan Jr. and Jane Norton Grew Morgan. Morgan left her fifty thousand dollars in his will, enough capital for her to live on comfortably, though she continued to supplement her inheritance with the $10,000-a-year salary that she earned at the library, a huge sum at the time, especially for a woman.

In 1924, she was named director of the Pierpont Morgan Library, following the transition of Morgan's formerly personal collection to a public institution. While working there, Greene identified works produced by the 'Spanish Forger'. She retired from the position in 1948. When she died in 1950, the New York Times referred to her as "one of the best known librarians in the country". In 1949, a year after she retired and a year before she died, the Morgan Library mounted an exhibition of over 250 of the best items that Greene had purchased. She attended while in a wheelchair.

Beyond her library role, Greene took on various positions within the profession. She was one of the first women named a fellow of the Mediaeval Academy of America. She was a fellow in perpetuity of the Metropolitan Museum of Art. Greene also served on the editorial boards of Gazette des Beaux Art and ARTnews. She was a member of the Hroswitha Club.

== Personal life ==
Greene never married. Her mother, Genevieve, lived with her for decades, and Greene played an active role in raising her nephew Robert Mackenzie Leveridge, who had been born in her home. In 1913, J. P. Morgan left Greene $50,000 (equivalent to $1,600,000 in 2025) in his will. Asked if she was Morgan's mistress, Greene replied, "We tried!" She had a lasting romantic relationship with the Renaissance Italian art expert Bernard Berenson, whom she met in 1909.

== Death and Memory ==
Greene died of cancer on May 10, 1950, at St. Luke's Hospital in New York City. Greene destroyed her personal papers before her death, but records held by others remain, including letters she wrote to Berenson. Her professional correspondence is archived in the collections of The Morgan Library & Museum. "Her body was ... cremated and the ashes buried in Kensico Cemetery, Valhalla, New York."

== Popular culture ==
The 2021 book The Personal Librarian by Marie Benedict and Victoria Christopher Murray features a historical fiction account of Greene's personal and professional life as J. P. Morgan's librarian. Another novel based on Greene's life is Belle Greene by Alexandra Lapierre.

== Commemoration ==
The Medieval Academy of America established the Belle da Costa Greene Award to fund research by medievalists of colour.

An exhibition Belle Da Costa Greene: a Librarian's Legacy ran at the Morgan Library between October 2024 and May 2025.
