= Junius Spencer Morgan (disambiguation) =

Junius Spencer Morgan (1813–1890), was an American banker and financier, father of J. P. Morgan

Junius Spencer Morgan may also refer to:

- Junius Spencer Morgan II (1867–1932), art collector and nephew of J. P. Morgan Sr.
- Junius Spencer Morgan III (1892–1960), son of J. P. Morgan Jr.
