= Spanish Forger =

Unidentified creator of fake medieval miniatures

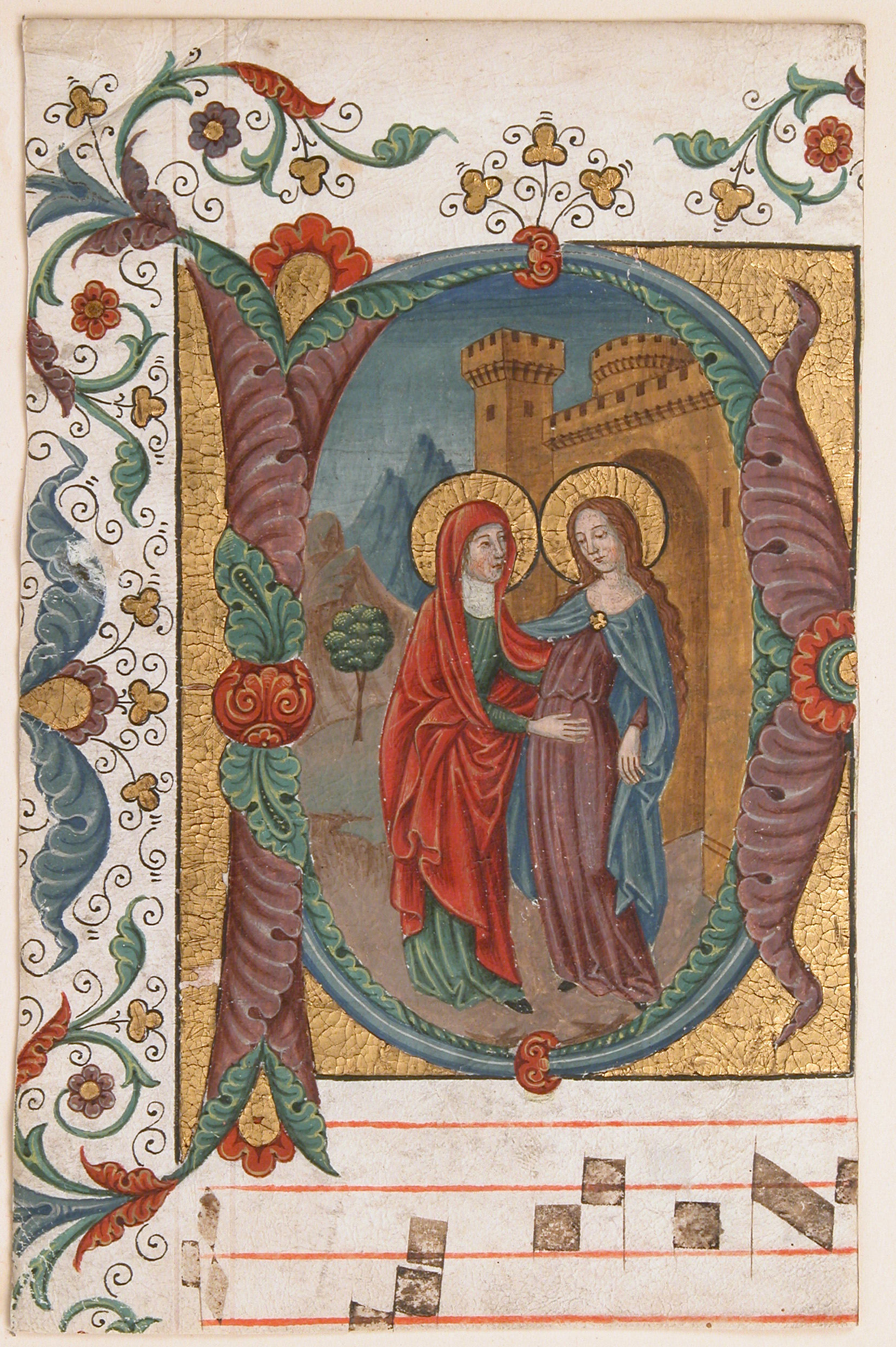
Forgery attributed to the Spanish Forger: Visitation scene, Metropolitan Museum of Art, New York

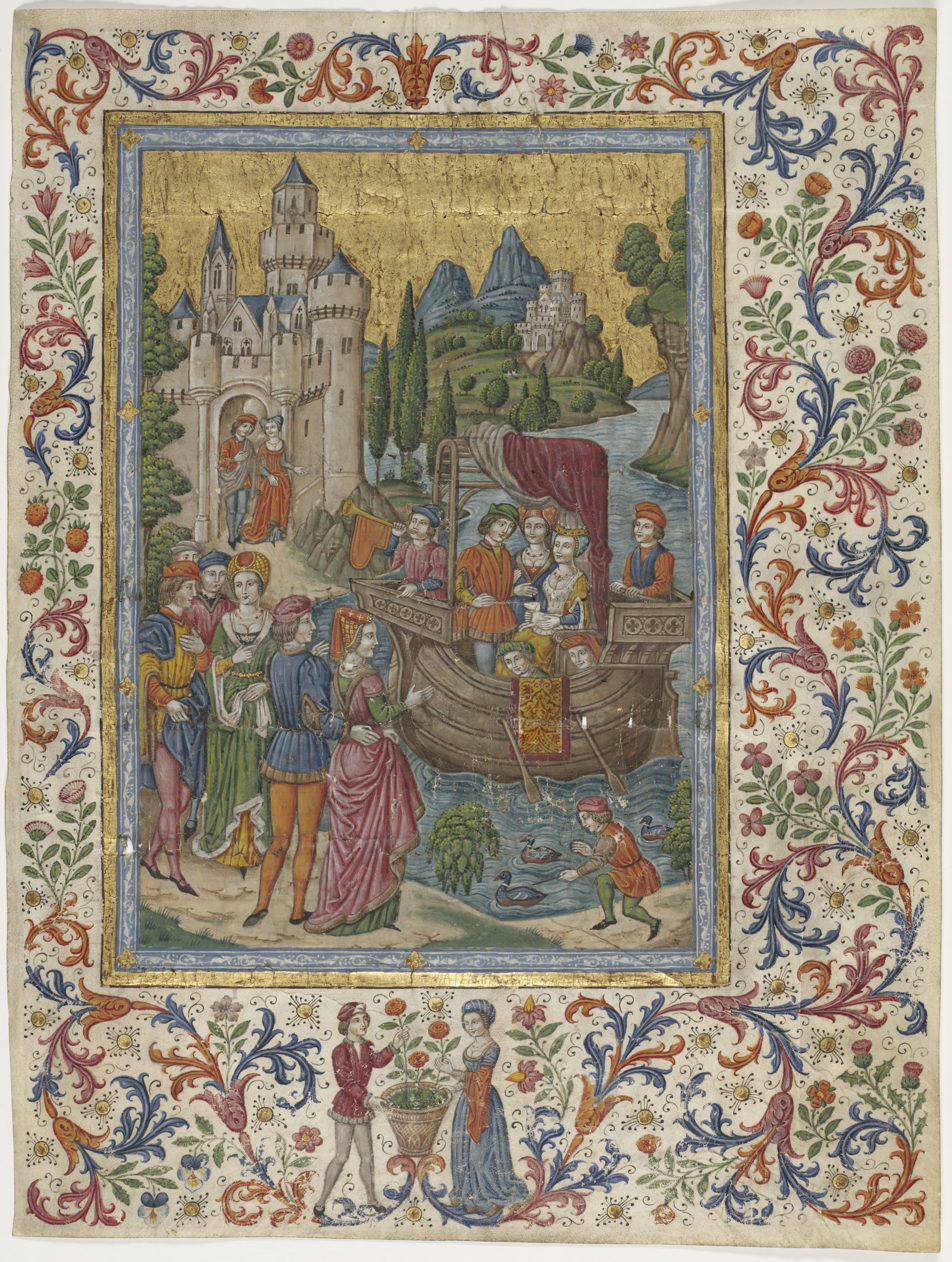
Boating party setting forth from a castle, 1890-1910, miniature attributed to the 'Spanish Forger'

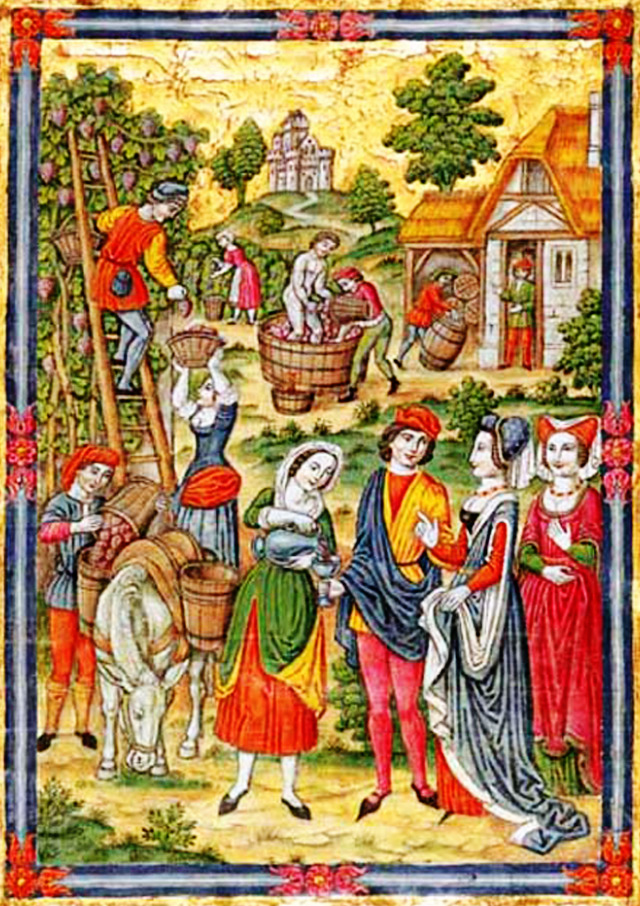
Miniature attributed to the Spanish Forger

The Spanish Forger (French: Le Faussaire espagnol) is the name given to an unidentified individual who, in the late 19th and early 20th centuries, created a large number of forgeries of medieval miniatures.

== Technique and materials ==
The Spanish Forger's works were painted on vellum or parchment leaves of genuine medieval books, using either blank margins or scraping off the original writing. They also "completed" unfinished miniatures or added missing miniatures in medieval choir books. Their works fooled many experts and collectors at the time and appear today in the collections of many museums and libraries. More than 200 forgeries have been identified.

== Nationality ==
As recently as 1930, the Forger was believed to be of Spanish origin. This is because one of their first identified forgeries was attributed as a genuine work by Jorge Inglés, a Spanish artist who was active during the 15th century. However, when one considers the provenance of the Forger's pieces along with many of the medieval collectible miniatures of the period, Paris was the center of purchasing, selling, and forging. A number of their forged miniatures have been identified as copied, with modifications, from those published in several French books dating to the 1870s−1880s.

== Identification ==
The work of the Spanish Forger was first identified by Belle da Costa Greene who worked at the Pierpont Morgan Library. She was also the one who dubbed the artist 'the Spanish Forger'.

Their works were very deceptive when created, but over time it has been recognized that the faces of individuals in their pictures have "sugary expressions" inconsistent with genuine medieval illuminations. Some of their miniatures have also been identified as forgeries because they are of secular scenes that would not have appeared in genuine medieval religious texts. Additionally, many of the individuals in the Spanish Forger's miniatures have a tilt to their heads that would not be present in authentic medieval works. In the "Knights of the Crusade" miniature, the bearded knight at the gate and the maiden in the bottom embellishment exhibit the classic head tilt. The facial expressions on most of the subjects in their miniatures are sweet and cloying, not pious and pensive as with true works. In legitimate medieval works, gold leaf was added first so that the paints would not be obscured by it. However, the Spanish Forger used gold leaf as a final touch, obscuring their paints and giving a lustrous appearance to their forgeries.

Up to a certain point, most of the Spanish Forger's miniatures had been identified by their unique stylistic characteristics. In 2009, Lucia Burgio, Robin Clark, and Richard Hark performed spectroscopic investigation, i.e. comprehensive analysis of pigments by Raman spectroscopy and X-ray fluorescence, upon five of the Spanish Forger's miniatures in order to determine with scientific certainty that the forgeries were exactly that. Use of the pigments ultramarine blue (first synthesized after 1828) and Scheele's green (synthesized after 1775) was discovered, providing solid evidence that the Forger's imitations were fabricated in post-medieval times.

== Exhibitions and collections ==
The Spanish Forger's works were the subject of an exhibition at the Morgan Library in New York City in 1978, for which an extensive catalog was published. Their works are now themselves collected as forgeries, selling for several thousand dollars each. They created more than 194 imitations that have been identified, which were purchased by multiple collectors of medieval art around the end of the 19th century and the beginning of the 20th century.

In January 2009, it was announced that the Victoria and Albert Museum purposely acquired five examples of the Spanish Forger's work for their collection "for what it tells us about late 19th-century perceptions". The museum took the works in lieu of £20,000 ($US 30,000) of inheritance tax, equivalent to a value per work of about $6,000. Another of the artist's paintings appeared on an episode of the US TV series Antiques Roadshow in 2014, being valued at around $4,000.

== See also ==
- Art forgery
- Ferdinand Charles François de Pape
