= Kimberla Lawson Roby =

American novelist

- Born: Kimberla Marie Lawson; May 3, 1965 (age 61); Rockford, Illinois, U.S.
- Education: Auburn Senior High School; Rock Valley College; Cardinal Stritch University
- Occupations: Author; speaker
- Spouse: Will M. Roby Jr. (m. 1990)
- Parent(s): Lucius "L.B." Lawson; Arletha Tennin Stapleton
- Writing career
- Notable awards: NAACP Image Award for Outstanding Literary Work – Fiction (2013)

Kimberla Lawson Roby (born May 3, 1965, in Rockford, Illinois) is an American author and speaker. She wrote the books of the "Reverend Curtis Black" series. Her sixth novel and second title in the series, Too Much of a Good Thing, became her first New York Times bestselling novel.

== Biography ==
She was born Kimberla Marie Lawson to Lucius "L.B." Lawson and Arletha Tennin Stapleton. In 1982, Roby graduated a year early as a junior from Auburn Senior High School's Academy Program in Rockford, Illinois. In 1987, she received an Associate Degree in Business from Rock Valley College in Rockford, Illinois. In 1993, she received a Bachelor of Science Degree in Business Administration from Cardinal Stritch University in Milwaukee, WI.

== Career ==
Roby held various jobs in Rockford, both in the corporate world and in city and state government, including as a financial analyst for the City of Rockford. At the age of 30, she decided to write her first novel, Behind Closed Doors, which took her seven months to complete. She then attempted to find a literary agent and publisher.

In June 1996, with money her husband borrowed from his 401K account and a small loan from their credit union, she founded her company, Lenox Press and published Behind Closed Doors. It was sold first at independent African-American Bookstores nationwide and ultimately at major chain bookstores. Within her first two months of official sales, a literary agent agreed to represent her, and her second book was sold to Kensington Publishing in New York. Her first was then picked up by Black Classic Press in Baltimore, MD.

In 1998, Roby signed with a new literary agent, Elaine Koster of the Elaine Koster Literary Agency, who represented Roby until Elaine's death in August 2010. Roby has also published books with HarperCollins Publishers (William Morrow and Avon Imprints), and she is currently published with Grand Central Publishing, a division of Hachette Book Group.

Roby's last book in her "Reverend Curtis Black" series, Better Late Than Never, was published in July 2018.

Roby resides in Illinois with her husband, Will M. Roby Jr., whom she married in September 1990.

== Bibliography ==
- The Woman God Created You to Be: Companion Workbook & Discussion Guide (2025)
- Sister Friends Forever (2022)
- The Woman God Created You to Be: Finding Success Through Faith—Spiritually, Personally, and Professionally (2020)
- Better Late than Never (2018)
- Sin of a Woman (2017)
- Copycat (2017)
- A Sinful Calling (2016)
- Best Friends Forever (2016)
- The Ultimate Betrayal (2015)
- A Christmas Prayer (2014)
- The Prodigal Son (2014)
- A House Divided (2013)
- The Perfect Marriage (2013)
- The Reverend's Wife (2012)
- Secret Obsession (2011)
- Love, Honor and Betray (2011)
- Be Careful What You Pray For (2010)
- A Deep Dark Secret (2009)
- The Best of Everything (2009)
- One In A Million (2008)
- Sin No More (2008)
- Love & Lies (2007)
- Changing Faces (2006)
- The Best-Kept Secret (2005)
- Too Much Of A Good Thing (2004)
- A Taste Of Reality (2003)
- It's A Thin Line (2001)
- Casting The First Stone (2000)
- Here and Now (1999)
- Behind Closed Doors (1997)

== Awards and recognition ==
In February 2013, Roby received the 2013 NAACP Image Award for Outstanding Work – Fiction for her novel The Reverend's Wife. She was nominated again in 2014 for her novel The Prodigal Son. She is the 2006, 2007, 2009, 2010, 2011 and 2013 recipient of the Author of the Year – Female award presented by the African-American Literary Award Show in New York, the recipient of the 1998 First-Time Author Award from Chicago's Black History Month Book Fair and Conference, and her fifth novel, A Taste Of Reality, was a 2004 finalist for the Atlanta Choice Awards sponsored by the Atlanta Daily World.

In 2001, Roby was inducted into the Rock Valley College (Rockford, IL) Alumni Hall of Fame.
