= Waiting to Exhale (novel) =

1992 novel by Terry McMillan

- Viking Press first edition
- Author: Terry McMillan
- Language: English
- Publisher: Viking Press
- Publication date: May 28, 1992
- Publication place: United States
- Media type: Print
- Pages: 409
- ISBN: 978-0670839803

Waiting to Exhale is American novelist Terry McMillan's third novel, published in 1992. It was the first of McMillan’s novels to garner national attention, debuting at #6 on the New York Times bestseller list, spending 11 weeks there. A film adaptation was released in 1995, starring Whitney Houston and Angela Bassett. A sequel, Getting to Happy, was published in 2010.

== Synopsis ==
Four middle-class, thirty-something Black women in Phoenix, Arizona are at the center of the book. Bernadine, Gloria, Robin and Savannah are friends whose relationships with men have been disappointing. Bernadine's husband of eleven years is leaving her for a white woman, Gloria's only man is her son Tarik, Robin has a succession of unreliable (at best) partners, and Savannah just moved to Phoenix from Denver.
