= The Interruption of Everything =

2005 novel by Terry McMillan

- First edition
- Author: Terry McMillan
- Language: English
- Genre: Novel
- Publisher: Viking Press
- Publication date: 2005
- Publication place: United States
- Media type: Print (hardback & paperback)
- ISBN: 0-670-03144-5
- OCLC: 58422658
- Dewey Decimal: 813/.54 22
- LC Class: PS3563.C3868 I58 2005

The Interruption of Everything is a 2005 novel written by Terry McMillan.

== Plot summary ==
Marilyn Grimes, a 44-year-old mother of three, has spent her time deferring her dreams to create the perfect suburban life for her family: her grown-up children, her live-in mother-in-law, an elderly poodle named Snuffy, and her workaholic husband Leon. She also keeps in touch with her friends (Paulette and Bunny), her aging mother, and her foster sister, while juggling a part-time job as an amateur crafts maker. This is a story of a woman who has too much on her plate and nothing to feed her desires and dreams.
