= Junius Spencer Morgan II =

American banker and art collector (1867–1932)

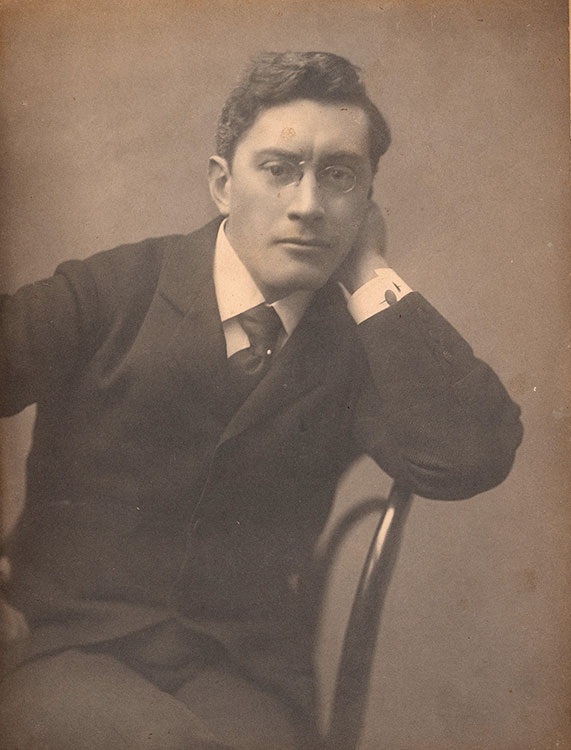
- Morgan c. 1900
- Born: June 5, 1867; Irvington, New York
- Died: August 18, 1932 (aged 65); Valmont, Switzerland
- Resting place: Cedar Hill Cemetery, Hartford, Connecticut, U.S.
- Education: St. Paul's School
- Alma mater: Princeton University
- Occupations: Banker; Art & Book Collector
- Spouse: Josephine Adams Perry
- Children: 2
- Parent(s): George Hale Morgan; Sarah Spencer Morgan
- Relatives: Morgan family
- Awards: Order of the Crown

Junius Spencer Morgan II (June 5, 1867 – August 18, 1932) was a banker, art collector and nephew of John Pierpont Morgan, Sr.

== Early life ==
Junius Spencer Morgan II was born on June 5, 1867, in Irvington, New York, to George Hale Morgan (1840–1911) and Sarah Spencer Morgan (1839–1896), distant cousins. His mother and her brother, John Pierpont Morgan, were two of the five children born to Junius Spencer Morgan (1813–1890), his grandfather, and Juliet Pierpont (1816–1884), the daughter of John Pierpont (1785–1866).

Junius II had a younger sister, Caroline Lucy Morgan (1873–1942), a philanthropist, who never married. He attended St. Paul's School in Concord, New Hampshire, class of 1884, and graduated from Princeton University with the class of 1888.

== Career ==
Morgan was a banker and a partner in the firm of Cuyler, Morgan & Co. and retired in 1906.

=== Philanthropy ===
Morgan was a generous benefactor of the Metropolitan Museum of Art in New York and gave many works to the (future) Department of Drawings and Prints from a broad range, dating mainly from the sixteenth century, including 2 woodblocks and many prints by Albrecht Dürer in 1919. He was equally generous in his gifts to what is now the Princeton University Art Museum, many of whose strengths in collecting prints and drawings can be traced to Morgan. Some of his other graphic works were sold at Anderson Galleries, New York, February 18, 1921.

Morgan was also a generous donor to his alma mater. When a student, he started collecting early editions of the Latin poet Virgil, a collection he gave to the Princeton University Library in 1896, adding new volumes every year until his death in 1932.

In January 1932, he was awarded the Order of the Crown of Italy by Signor Comandante Emanuele Grazzi, the Italian Consul General.

== Personal life ==
Morgan was married to Josephine Adams Perry (1869–1963), the daughter of Brig. Gen. Alexander James Perry (1828–1913) and Josephine Adams (1834–1917), and the granddaughter of Nathaniel Hazard Perry (1803–1832), the brother of Commodore Oliver Hazard Perry and youngest son of Christopher Raymond Perry. From 1892 to 1897, they lived in Rye at the Jay Estate, where their first child was born. Together, they had:

- Sarah Spencer Morgan (1893–1949), who married Henry B. Gardner (1891–1932) in 1913.
- Alexander Perry Morgan (1900–1968), who married Janet Croll (1901–1985) in 1921.

On August 18, 1932, Morgan died of a heart attack in Valmont, Switzerland, while with his sister Caroline. His funeral was held at the American Cathedral Church of the Trinity in Paris, and he was buried in Cedar Hill Cemetery. The bulk of his estate was left to his two children.

== Popular culture ==
Morgan is featured in the book The Personal Librarian as the individual who introduces Belle da Costa Greene to his uncle J.P. Morgan.

== See also ==
- Morgan family
