= The Mothers (novel) =

2016 novel by Brit Bennett

- Author: Brit Bennett
- Illustrator: Rachel Willey
- Cover artist: Rachel Willey
- Language: English
- Genre: Literary fiction
- Publisher: Riverhead Books
- Publication date: 2016 (first edition)
- Publication place: United States
- Media type: Print & digital
- Pages: 275
- ISBN: 9780349701493

The Mothers is a debut novel by Brit Bennett. The book follows Nadia, a young woman who left her Southern California hometown years ago after the suicide of her mother and is called back to attend to a family emergency. The Mothers, released on October 11, 2016 by Riverhead Books, received critical acclaim and was a New York Times bestseller. A film adaptation is being produced by Kerry Washington's production company Simpson Street.

== Plot ==
Living in Southern California, 17-year-old Nadia, grieving her mother's suicide, becomes pregnant by her boyfriend Luke, a local pastor's son. She has an abortion and leaves her hometown to attend the University of Michigan. Years later, her Christian friend Aubrey begins dating and then marries Luke. In her adulthood Nadia has to return to her hometown for a family emergency and reckon with her past.

== Themes ==
The book includes themes of Christianity in the context of the Black church, shame, and motherhood.

== Background ==
Bennett began writing the novel when she was 17 years old. She used many elements of her own life to craft the narrative; she and the protagonist, Nadia, were both high-achievers who maintained close ties to their families even after leaving home for college. Nadia's hometown is based on Bennett's hometown of Oceanside, California, an ethnically-diverse beach town. Bennett continued to work on the novel after leaving for college and while completing her MFA at University of Michigan.

In 2014 Bennett published a viral essay on Jezebel.com called "I Don’t Know What to Do With Good White People", shortly after the deaths of Eric Garner and Michael Brown. Literary agent Julia Kardon read the essay and contacted Bennett to offer her representation to write and sell a book, which became her manuscript, The Mothers.

== Reception ==
The book generated buzz prior to its release. In a positive review for The New York Times Book Review, Mira Jacob wrote, "Despite Bennett’s thrumming plot, despite the snap of her pacing, it’s the always deepening complexity of her characters that provides the book’s urgency. Bennett’s ability to unwind them gently, offering insights both shocking and revelatory, has a striking effect." Reni Eddo-Lodge reviewed the book for The Guardian: "The Mothers is a beautifully written, sad and lingering book – an impressive debut for such a young writer." Constance Grady praised Bennett's writing in Vox: "What elevates the book are the emotional underpinnings of each character, and Bennett’s lively, precise voice. Nadia may not have a surprising arc, but she feels every minute of it deeply and profoundly." Bethanne Patrick further praised the writing in The Washington Post, "Bennett has written that rare combination: a book that feels alive on the page and rich for later consideration."

The Mothers was a New York Times bestseller.

== Accolades ==
- Best Books of 2016, Kirkus Reviews
- 2016 – 5 Under 35 Honoree, National Book Foundation
- 2016 – John Leonard Prize, National Book Critics Circle, Finalist
- 2016 – Goodreads Choice Award for Debut Goodreads Author, Nominee
- 2017 – PEN/Robert W. Bingham Prize for Debut Fiction, Finalist

== Film adaptation ==
In March 2017 it was announced that Kerry Washington was lead producer on a film adaptation for the novel, to be produced through her company Simpson Street for Warner Bros.
