= The Queens of Crime =

2025 novel by Marie Benedict

- First edition hardcover
- Author: Marie Benedict
- Language: English
- Genre: Murder mystery; historical mystery
- Publisher: St. Martin's Press
- Publication date: February 11, 2025
- Publication place: United States
- Pages: 320
- ISBN: 9781250280756

The Queens of Crime is a murder mystery novel by American author Marie Benedict. It was published by St. Martin's Press on February 11, 2025. The novel is based on a murder investigation that involved Dorothy L. Sayers and centers fictionalized versions of the real-life Queens of Crime.

== Background ==
Benedict was introduced to Dorothy L. Sayers' books as a teenager by an aunt who was an English professor, poet, and nun. She developed the idea for the novel while doing research for another novel, The Mystery of Mrs. Christie, where she learned that Sayers had been tapped by the police to help locate her. When she uncovered the real-life murder investigation Sayers was involved with, Benedict became fascinated with the idea of a detective fiction writer becoming a detective herself. May Daniels was based on the real-life victim of the murder that Sayers investigated, and Benedict used the newspaper articles reporting on the investigation to form an understanding of Daniels and her murder. While Baroness Orczy was not a member of the real-life Queens of Crime, Benedict decided to include her out of a desire to explore a friendship between "women from different ages, continents, social strata, economic backgrounds, and ethnicities". Her research into the women involved reading their autobiographies and novels. Benedict fictionalized the Detection Club's attitude to its female members, as she did not come across any indication that the club was anything but receptive to them.

== Synopsis ==
In 1931 London, Dorothy L. Sayers is frustrated that she is considered a second-tier member of the Detection Club by the male writers, even though she helped found the club. She calls on four other female writers—Agatha Christie, Ngaio Marsh, Margery Allingham, and Baroness Orczy—to form the Queens of Crime in response. They declare they will solve a real-life mystery to prove that their talent is equal to that of men. Soon, they are embroiled in the case of a young English nurse, May Daniels, who went missing during a day trip to France a few months prior, and whose bloody body was recently found in the site of her disappearance. The police announce, based on little evidence, that she was a drug addict who deserved little sympathy, and close the case. The Queens then set out to truly solve the case. After they learn of a second death, Dorothy is attacked and threatened with the exposure of a potentially reputation-ruining secret.

== Reception ==
Pam O'Sullivan of Library Journal called the novel "hard to put down" and praised its "vivid" realization of the Golden Age of Detective Fiction novelists and its 1930s setting. Kirkus Reviews called it a "routine whodunit enlivened by the byplay among the author sleuths and their determination to stand up to the patriarchy." Publishers Weekly wrote that Benedict honors to legacies of the five writers by providing plenty of "ingenious, fair-play" clues. Cheryl McKeon of Shelf Awareness called the writers' sleuthing "riveting" and their backstories "equally intriguing". Chris Hewitt of The Minnesota Star Tribune called the idea for the novel "ingenious", but criticized its lack of "rounded" characters. Tom Nolan of The Wall Street Journal praised the novel for balancing the dangers with "colorful settings, deft characterizations and plenty of charm."

== Audiobook ==
An audiobook narrated by Bessie Carter was released concurrently with the hardcover and ebook editions. It was nominated for an Audie Award for Mystery. Katherine A. Powers of The Washington Post praised Carter's narration, calling each of the five writers "distinctly herself" in Carter's delivery, and stating she "perfectly captured" the Scottish accent of Sayer's husband Mac Fleming. Kirkus Reviews similarly praised Carter's ability to keep track of a wide range of accents, and praised her "subtle changes in tone" for fostering "a growing sense of intrigue".
