= Terry McMillan =

American author (born 1951)

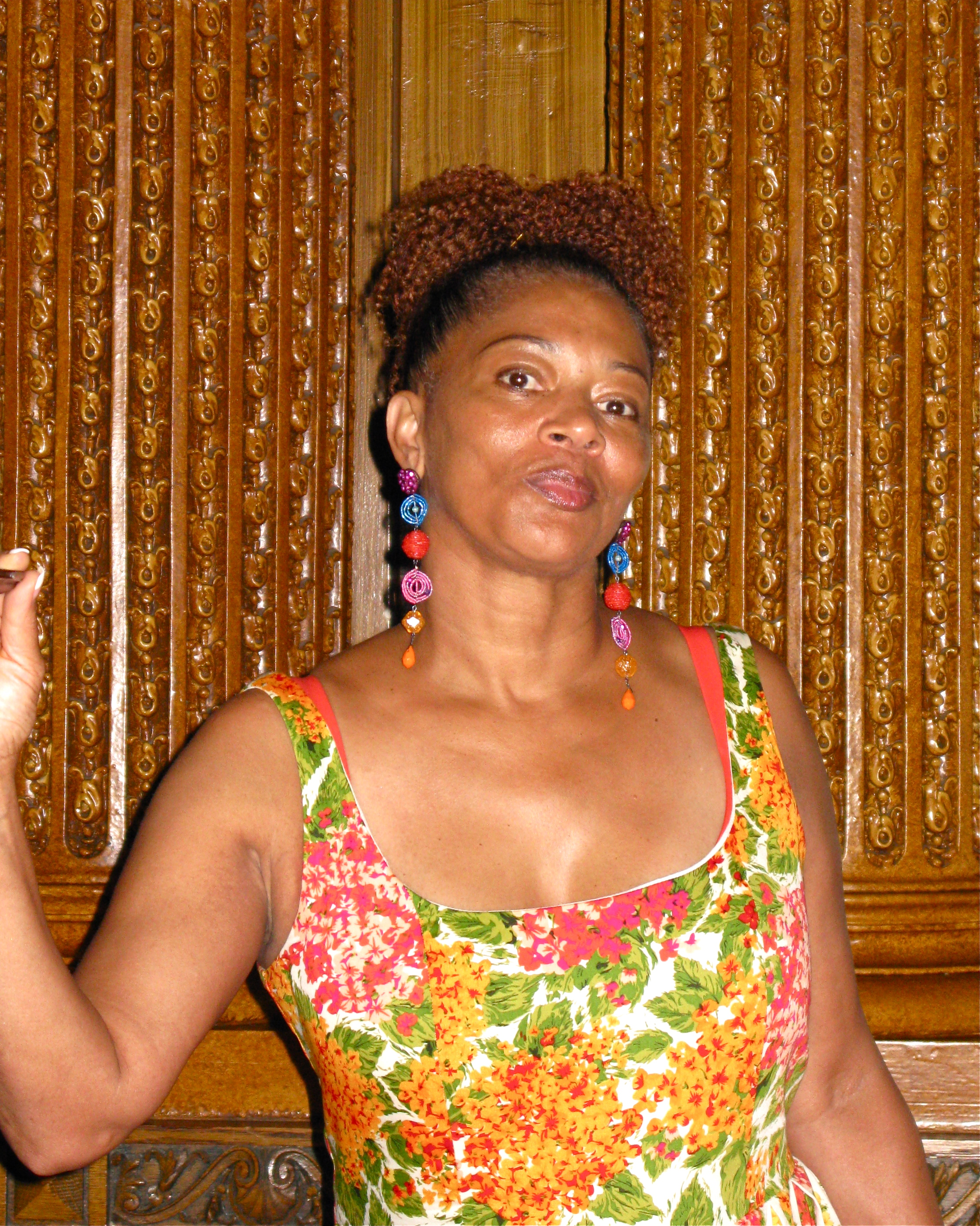
- McMillan at the 2008 Brooklyn Book Festival
- Born: October 18, 1951 (age 75); Port Huron, Michigan, U.S.
- Education: University of California, Berkeley (BA)
- Occupations: Writer, novelist
- Spouse: Jonathan Plummer (m. 1998; div. 2005)
- Children: 1 (son)
- Writing career
- Genre: Fiction
- Notable works: Waiting to Exhale (1992); How Stella Got Her Groove Back (1996); A Day Late and a Dollar Short (2001); The Interruption of Everything (2006); Getting to Happy (2010)

Terry McMillan (born October 18, 1951) is an American novelist known for her vivid portrayals of African American women's lives, relationships, and journeys of self-discovery. Her best-selling works, including Waiting to Exhale and How Stella Got Her Groove Back, have resonated widely for their humor, authenticity, and emotional insight. McMillan's contributions have influenced contemporary fiction and continue to shape the representation of Black women in literature and film.

== Early life and education ==
The oldest of five children, McMillan was born in Port Huron, Michigan. Her father died when she was a teenager, and McMillan was raised by her single mother, who worked for Ford Motor Co. and who stressed the importance of education. McMillan was introduced to literature while working at the local Port Huron library at age 16–previously, she had only had access to assigned school readings and the Bible. After high school, she moved to Los Angeles where she stayed with a cousin who lived across the street from Los Angeles City College. Upon learning that she could attend for free, McMillan enrolled and began taking writing classes there while working as a secretary for Prudential Insurance Company. She is the first in her family to attend college. McMillan began writing in earnest at the college after a friend asked if he could publish a poem of hers for his new Black literary magazine.

After transferring to the University of California at Berkeley as a first-generation college student with a scholarship, McMillan considered majoring in sociology because she "care[d] about the human race"; however, an advisor, who had read her articles in The Daily Californian, the school newspaper, encouraged her to consider a major related to writing. Initially skeptical that she could make money as a writer, McMillan did go on to receive a B.A. degree in journalism in 1977. She later realized that journalism was not the best pathway either as one has to "tell the truth," and she wanted to tell stories. McMillan attended the Master of Fine Arts program in film at Columbia University. McMillan stated that she dropped out due to racism she experienced there.

== Career ==
In 1976, McMillan published her first short story, "The End," while still in college. She then submitted a collection of short stories to Houghton Mifflin, and they expressed interest in a novel she had mentioned but declined to publish her collection.

McMillan's first book, Mama, was published in 1987. The Harlem Writers Guild had encouraged her to expand one of her short stories of the same name into the novel format. McMillan worked for a month and a half at the MacDowell and Yaddo artist colonies while writing. Unsatisfied with her publisher's limited promotion of Mama, McMillan promoted her own debut novel by writing to thousands of booksellers, particularly African-American bookstores, and the book soon sold out of its initial first hardcover printing of 5,000 copies. Many of these were presales, and she set up readings and her own book tour to continue the book's promotion as well.

In 1987, McMillan taught at the University of Wyoming, moving to the University of Arizona in 1989. That year, she published Disappearing Acts, examining doomed Black romantic relationships, inspired by one of her own.

In 1990, McMillan created an anthology of Black writing in Breaking Ice: An Anthology of African-American Fiction. She had been dismayed by the lack of Black writers in school curricula as a child, and now as a professor, and wanted to showcase acclaimed and up-and-coming Black authors for people to engage with.

McMillan achieved national attention in 1992 with her third novel, Waiting to Exhale. At the time, it was the second largest paperback book deal in publishing history. The book remained on The New York Times bestseller list for many months and by 1995 it had sold more than three million copies. The success of Waiting to Exhale helped change the publishing industry's approach to Black popular culture. The novel contributed to a shift in Black popular cultural consciousness and the visibility of a female Black middle-class identity in popular culture. McMillan was credited with having introduced the interior world of Black women professionals in their thirties who are successful, alone, available, and unhappy. In 1995, the novel was adapted into a film of the same title, directed by Forest Whitaker and starring Whitney Houston, Angela Bassett, Loretta Devine, and Lela Rochon.

In 1998, another of McMillan's novels, How Stella Got Her Groove Back, was adapted into a film by the same name starring Angela Bassett and Taye Diggs.

McMillan's novel Disappearing Acts was subsequently produced as a direct-to-cable feature by the same name in 2000, starring Wesley Snipes and Sanaa Lathan and directed by Gina Prince-Bythewood. In 2014, Lifetime brought McMillan's A Day Late and a Dollar Short to television audiences, starring Whoopi Goldberg and an ensemble cast featuring Ving Rhames, Tichina Arnold, Mekhi Phifer, Anika Noni Rose, and Kimberly Elise. McMillan also wrote The Interruption of Everything (2006) and Getting to Happy (2010), the sequel to Waiting to Exhale. In 2024, McMillian signed a partnership with Lifetime to executive produce a series of movies which would appear under the banner of "Terry McMillan Presents".

== Personal life ==
McMillan married Jonathan Plummer in 1998, who came out as gay during their marriage. In March 2005, she filed for divorce.

On July 13, 2012, she sold her 7,000-square-foot home in Danville, California, before moving to Los Angeles, California.

McMillan has one child, a son, Solomon.

== Works ==
- Mama. Houghton Mifflin Harcourt. 1987. ISBN 978-0-547-52404-7.
- Disappearing Acts. Penguin Group US. 1989. ISBN 978-1-101-65772-0.
- (Editor) Breaking Ice: An Anthology of Contemporary African-American Fiction. Penguin Books. October 1990. ISBN 978-0140116977.
- Waiting to Exhale. Viking. May 1992. ISBN 978-0-670-83980-3.
- How Stella Got Her Groove Back. Viking. 1996. ISBN 978-0451209146.
- A Day Late and a Dollar Short. Penguin Group US. 2001. ISBN 978-1-101-20938-7.
- It's OK if You're Clueless: and 23 More Tips for the College Bound. Viking Adult. March 2006. ISBN 978-1419397332.
- The Interruption of Everything. Penguin Group US. 2005. ISBN 978-1-101-20981-3.
- Getting to Happy. Penguin Group US. 2010. ISBN 978-1-101-44294-4.
- Who Asked You? Viking, September 2013. ISBN 978-0670-78569-8
- I Almost Forgot About You. Crown, New York. 2016. ISBN 978-1101-9025-78.
- It's Not All Downhill From Here. Ballantine Books. 2020. ISBN 978-1984-8237-48.
- It Was the Way She Said It (short stories, essays, wisdom). 2026.
