= Getting to Happy =

2010 novel by Terry McMillan

- Viking Press first edition
- Author: Terry McMillan
- Language: English
- Publisher: Viking Press
- Publication date: September 7, 2010
- Publication place: United States
- Media type: Print
- Pages: 373
- ISBN: 978-0670022045
- Preceded by: Waiting to Exhale

Getting to Happy, published in 2010, is the sequel to author Terry McMillan's 1992 novel Waiting to Exhale. Set 15 years after the ending of Waiting to Exhale, the novel takes place in Phoenix, Arizona, and follows the experiences of four African-American female friends (Savannah, Robin, Bernadine, Gloria) in their early 50s and early 60s.

McMillan wrote the novel as a guide for older women who have experienced loss and dejection, forcing them to hit the reset button on their lives. The characters from Waiting to Exhale were used as inspiration for this book.

== Plot summary ==
Since the end of Waiting to Exhale, Savannah has secured a highly rewarding job and has married her "Mr. Wonderful", or so she thought. While Savannah and her husband Isaac shared many good times together, Savannah began to realize that their close-knit relationship had drifted away and she was falling out of love. Uninterested in Isaac's work and focused on her own, Savannah refuses to go on a Vegas trip with him. In Isaac's absence, Savannah is met with the reality that her husband has an unhealthy porn addiction. This leads her to want and acquire a divorce.

Robin has been so hyper-focused on maintaining her job and raising her outspoken daughter Sparrow that she has had no time to even think about her love and sex life. Sparrow notices this and criticizes her mother for it. Robin knows that she has not been fortunate in that department and would like to someday be married; however, her chances seem slim. Without marriage, Robin is also left with her dream of wearing a wedding dress deferred. She fears she has missed the mark, and it is too late for her. In an effort to help, Sparrow creates an online dating profile for her, but the results are not entirely hopeful.

Having been six years since Bernadine's divorce from her ex-husband John, Bernadine remarries to a man named James. However, this new marriage has taken an unexpected turn. Bernadine is immediately confronted with a call from James' other wife, claiming that everything James has been telling her over the years has been a lie, including the fact that "James" is not even his real name. Ironically, John was skeptical about this marriage from the start. Due to this scandal, Bernadine was cheated out of her own money, closed her café, became addicted to pills, and rekindled her relationship with John.

Gloria, on the other hand, was living the dream. She shared a happy and healthy marriage with her husband Marvin, had a wonderful family, and a flourishing salon and spa business called "Oasis". However, on her anniversary, tragedy struck. Marvin was killed, and now Gloria is forced to live life without her lover. Gloria plunged into depression, causing Oasis' success to heavily decline and her to gain back all the weight she lost over the years. In addition to her own misfortune, Gloria is also confronted with the new-found information that her daughter-in-law, Nickida, is a criminal and adulteress.

== Major themes ==
=== Self-growth ===
The journey of self-growth is emphasized throughout the entirety of the novel. Savannah was being released from the notion that her marriage had ended, and now she did not know what to do with herself. Robin revisited her past actions and realized that she did not value relationships the way she does now. Bernadine realized that hiding behind pain medication was not going to improve her situation or get her back to normal; instead, she was going to have to face her faults and “regain her former joy". Gloria was able to maintain strength after her husband's death, continuing to live life in his absence.

=== Importance of friendship and sisterhood ===
In Waiting to Exhale, the four best friends were very tight-knit and heavily reliant on each other. However, in Getting to Happy, these women have drifted apart due to their busy schedules and new life experiences. They no longer share every detail of their lives or just get together to spend time with one another. They also consider themselves to be “too old” to party together like they used to. Eventually, when times begin to get rough, they realize that they are better together than they are separate. Their hardships created an opportunity for them to provide each other with emotional support and build each other's self-esteem and sense of security. Each of them equally gets on each other's nerves, but they remain truthful and encouraging towards one another. This novel highlights the joy and comfort that come from having a black sisterhood and compassionate friends.

=== Relationships with men ===
This novel consists of many letdowns from men, such as Bernadine having to pay back a loan that her ex-husband was supposed to be taking care of, Savannah finding out about her husband's porn addiction and then having to lend him money after their divorce, and Robin being a single parent providing it all for her now teenage daughter. However, even after all of these instances, these women were able to pick themselves up and continue down the path of finding their joy. The novel sends the message that women should not rely on men to bring them happiness; happiness should come from within.

=== Family ===
The dynamic of family is prevalent within this novel. Between Bernadine's ex-husband John becoming a good friend of hers and lending a helping hand after "James", Bernadine taking in Taylor (John's daughter) after her mother abandons her, or Robin's daughter Sparrow, who is highly mature, acting as her matchmaker to help her mother, the novel highlights that you can find assistance and comfort from the people you least expect. On the other hand, the negative treatment of family is also highlighted. Instances of abandonment, abuse, forgetfulness, and the unwillingness to help when one is in need are all revealed.
