= Heather Terrell =

American novelist and lawyer (born 1968)

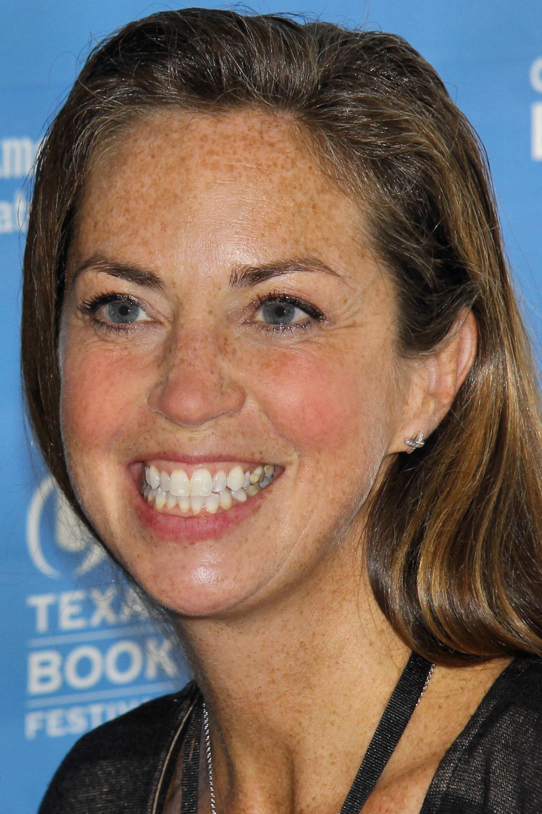
- At the 2013 Texas Book Festival
- Born: Heather Marie Benedict; November 24, 1968 (age 57)
- Education: Boston College (BA); Boston University (JD)
- Occupations: Lawyer, novelist
- Spouse: Jim Terrell
- Children: 2
- Writing career
- Pen name: Marie Benedict
- Genre: Historical fiction novel

Heather Benedict Terrell (born November 24, 1968) is an American novelist and lawyer who writes some of her novels under the pen name Marie Benedict.

== Life and education ==
Terrell attended and graduated from Upper St. Clair High School in Pittsburgh. She then studied History and Art History at Boston College, where she graduated magna cum laude. She then attended and graduated cum laude from Boston University School of Law.

Terrell lives in Pittsburgh with her husband Jim Terrell and their two children.

== Career ==
After graduating from Boston University School of Law, Terrell worked as a litigator for ten years, practicing in New York City at Skadden, Arps, Slate, Meagher & Flom, and Morrison & Foerster.

Terrell published her first novel, The Chrysalis, in 2007, after which she left her work as a litigator and began writing full time. Terrell's "mission is to excavate from the past the most important, complex and fascinating women of history and bring them into the light of present-day where we can finally perceive the breadth of their contributions as well as the insights they bring to modern day issues." Later in her career, Terrell began writing about women who were often overshadowed by the men in their lives, including Mileva Marić (The Other Einstein, 2016), Hedy Lamarr (The Only Woman in the Room, 2019), Clementine Churchill (Lady Clementine, 2020), Belle da Costa Greene (The Personal Librarian, 2021), and Rosalind Franklin (Her Hidden Genius, 2022). Terrell's novels have been translated into twenty-nine languages.

== Selected texts ==
=== The Only Woman in the Room (2019) ===
The Only Woman in the Room, published in 2019 by Sourcebooks Landmark, is a fictionalized biography of Hedy Lamarr. The book is a New York Times and USA Today bestseller and Barnes & Noble Book Club Pick. In 2019, it received a space in Library Reads's Hall of Fame.

=== Lady Clementine (2020) ===
Lady Clementine, published January 7, 2020, by Sourcebooks Landmark, is a fictionalized biography of Clementine Churchill, the wife of Winston Churchill. The book received a starred review from Library Journal and received a space in Library Reads's Hall of Fame.

=== The Mystery of Mrs. Christie (2020) ===
The Mystery of Mrs. Christie, published in 2020 by Sourcebooks Landmark, follows the disappearance of Agatha Christie in December 1926. The book was a New York Times and USA Today bestseller. In December 2020, Library Reads named Terrell a Hall of Fame author for the book.

=== The Personal Librarian (2021) ===
The Personal Librarian, co-authored by Victoria Christopher Murray and published in 2021 by Berkley Books, is a fictionalized biography of Belle da Costa Greene's life as the personal librarian to J. P. Morgan and the first director of the Morgan Library & Museum.

The Personal Librarian received starred reviews from Booklist and Library Journal, as well as positive reviews from news outlets. Booklist named The Personal Librarian one of the top ten historical fiction novels of 2021. It was also nominated for the Goodreads Choice Award for Historical Fiction the same year.

== Publications ==
=== As Marie Benedict ===
- The Other Einstein (2016)
- Carnegie's Maid (2018)
- The Only Woman in the Room (2019)
- Agent 355 (2020)
- Lady Clementine (2020)
- The Mystery of Mrs. Christie (2020)
- The Personal Librarian, co-authored by Victoria Christopher Murray (2021)
- Smoke Signal, co-authored by Kate Quinn (2021)
- Her Hidden Genius (2022)
- The Mitford Affair (2023)
- The First Ladies, co-authored by Victoria Christopher Murray (2023)
- The Queens of Crime (2025)
- Daughter of Egypt (2026)
- A Pair of Aces, co-authored by Victoria Christopher Murray (2026)

=== As Heather Terrell ===
- The Chrysalis: A Novel. Random House Publishing Group. 15 May 2007. ISBN 978-0-345-50029-8.
- The Map Thief. Random House Publishing Group. April 2009. ISBN 978-0-345-49469-6.
- Brigid of Kildare: A Novel. Random House Publishing Group. 9 February 2010. ISBN 978-0-345-51529-2.
- Fallen Angel. HarperCollins. 28 December 2010. ISBN 978-0-06-203966-8.
- Eternity. HarperCollins. 28 June 2011. ISBN 978-0-06-208447-7.
- Relic. Soho Press. 2013. ISBN 9781616954390.
- Boundary. Soho Press. 9 December 2014. ISBN 9781616951986.

== Sources ==
- Contemporary Authors Online. The Gale Group, 2008. PEN (Permanent Entry Number): 0000177917.
- Bob Hoover (2003). Pittsburgh Post-Gazette: Profile of Heather Terrell. Retrieved November 29, 2008.
