= ReShonda Tate =

American journalist

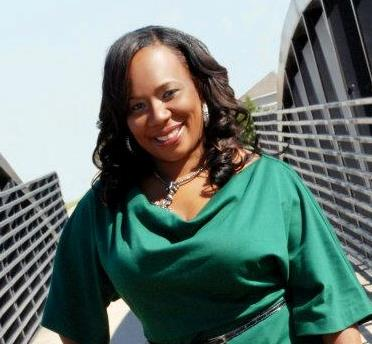
- Occupations: Author and journalist
- Writing career
- Pen name: ReShonda Tate Billingsley
- Genres: Adult fiction; teen fiction; contemporary; Christian fiction; romance
- Notable works: Let the Church Say Amen; The Secret She Kept
- Website: reshondatate.com

Reshonda Tate (born in 1969) is an American author and journalist. Tate is also known as "ReShonda Tate Billingsley."

== Education ==
She is a graduate of the University of Texas at Austin.

== Career ==
Tate is the USA Today Bestselling author of 54 books, and has contributed to several anthologies. Currently, she writes historical fiction. She has previously written nonfiction works, as well as adult and teen fiction under the name ReShonda Tate Billingsley. Three of her novels have been nominated for the NAACP Image Award for Outstanding Fiction. Several of her books have been made into movies; Let the Church Say Amen and The Secret She Kept. The film adaptation of her sophomore novel Let the Church Say Amen, directed by Regina King and produced by TD Jakes and Queen Latifah, originally aired on BET.

An inductee into the Arkansas Black Hall of Fame and the Texas Literary Hall of Fame, Tate is also a screenwriter. In 2014, Tate co-founded a publishing company, Brown Girls Books, with author Victoria Christopher Murray. She has also appeared in the stage play Marriage Material by Je'Caryous Johnson.

Tate previously worked for NBC affiliate KFOR in Oklahoma City, as well as KRIV-TV and KPRC-TV in Houston and KJAC in Port Arthur.

== Books ==
- My Brother's Keeper (2003) ISBN 978-0743477130
- Four Degrees of Heat (anthology) (2004) Excerpt: "Rebound" ISBN 978-0743491457
- Let the Church Say Amen (2004) ISBN 978-1476708874
- Help! I've Turned Into My Mother (2005) ISBN 978-1593090500
- I Know I've Been Changed (2006) ISBN 978-1416511984
- Have A Little Faith (anthology) (2006) Excerpt: "Faith Will Overcome" ISBN 978-1416516767
- Nothing But Drama (2006) ISBN 978-1416525608
- Everybody Say Amen (2007) ISBN 978-1416521655
- With Friends Like These (2007) ISBN 978-1416525622
- Blessing in Disguise (2007) ISBN 978-1416525615
- The Pastor's Wife (2007) ISBN 978-1416521662
- Getting Even (2008) ISBN 978-1416558736
- Fair-Weather Friends (2008) ISBN 978-1416558767
- Can I Get a Witness? (2008) ISBN 978-1416521679
- The Devil is a Lie (2009) ISBN 978-1416578048
- Friends 'Til the End (2009) ISBN 978-1416558774
- Caught up in the Drama (2010) ISBN 978-1439156865
- Holy Rollers (2010) ISBN 978-1416578055
- Drama Queens (2010) ISBN 978-1439156872
- Body of Innocence (2011) ISBN 978-0615577449
- A Good Man is Hard to Find (2011) ISBN 978-1439183502
- Lady Jasmine / Sins of the Mother / Let the Church Say Amen / Everybody Say Amen (2011) ISBN 978-1451651096
- Say Amen, Again (2011) ISBN 978-1416578062
- Sinners & Saints (2012) ISBN 978-1451608151
- Something to Say: poetry to motivate the mind, body and soul (2012) ASIN B006WX2OMQ
- The Secret She Kept (July 2012) ISBN 978-1451639650
- Finding Amos (2012) ISBN 978-1451617047
- Real As It Gets (2012) ISBN 978-0758289551
- You Don't Know Me Like That (2013) ISBN 978-0758289537
- Rumor Central (2013) ISBN 978-0758289513
- Friends & Foes (2013) ISBN 978-1451608168
- The Motherhood Diaries (2013) ISBN 978-1476711454
- A Family Affair (2013) ISBN 978-1451639711
- Fortune & Fame (2014) ISBN 978-1476747170
- Truth or Dare (2014) ISBN 978-0758289575
- Boy Trouble (2014) ISBN 978-0758289599
- The Motherhood Diaries 2 (2014) ISBN 978-1625174529
- What's Done in the Dark (2014) ISBN 978-1476714929
- A Blessing & A Curse (2015) ISBN 978-1476748887
- Eye Candy (2015) ISBN 978-0758289612
- Pay Day (2015) ISBN 978-1625178329
- Mama's Boy (2015) ISBN 978-1476714950
- The Perfect Mistress (2016) ISBN 978-1476715049
- It Should've Been Me (2016) ISBN 978-1944359515
- Seeking Sarah (2017) ISBN 978-1501156625
- The Book in Room 316 (2018) ISBN 978-1501156663
- If Only For One Night (2018) ISBN 978-1944359720
- The Stolen Daughter (2019) ISBN 978-1496724144
- More to Life (2019) ISBN 978-1496724120
- A Little Bit of Karma (2020) ISBN 978-1439183588
- Miss Pearly's Girls: A Captivating Tale of Family Healing (2022) ISBN 978-1496735393
- The Queen of Sugar Hill: A Novel of Hattie McDaniel (2024) ISBN 978-0063291072
- With Love From Harlem: A Novel of Hazel Scott (2026)ISBN 978-0063421189

== Awards ==
- Texas Literary Hall of Fame (2022)
- Smithsonian's African American History Makers (2016)
- African American Literary Award for Best Christian Fiction for Fortune & Fame (2014) with Victoria Christopher Murray
- NAACP Image Award for Outstanding Literature (2012)
- African American Literary Award for Best Teen Fiction for Drama Queens (2011)
- Inductee into the Arkansas Black Hall of Fame (2010)
- Rolling Out Magazine′s Top 25 Women of Houston (2009)
- Five-time winner of the National Association of Black Journalists "Spirit in the Words"
- Let the Church Say Amen named one of Library Journal's Best Books 2004 in Christian Fiction
- #1 Essence best-selling author
- 2006 Texas Executive Woman on the Move
- Black Writers Alliance Gold Pen Award for best new author (2002)
- Mama's Boy named one of Library Journal's Best Books 2015 in African American Fiction

== Personal ==
Tate was born in Kansas City, Missouri, to Bruce Tate and Nancy Kilgore. She moved to Arkansas at a young age and spent most of her childhood in her mother’s hometown of Smackover. She later moved to Houston, Texas, where she graduated from Madison High School. She earned a bachelor’s degree in journalism from the University of Texas at Austin. She is married to Jeffrey Caradine and has three children and two bonus children.
