= Natashia Deón =

American novelist

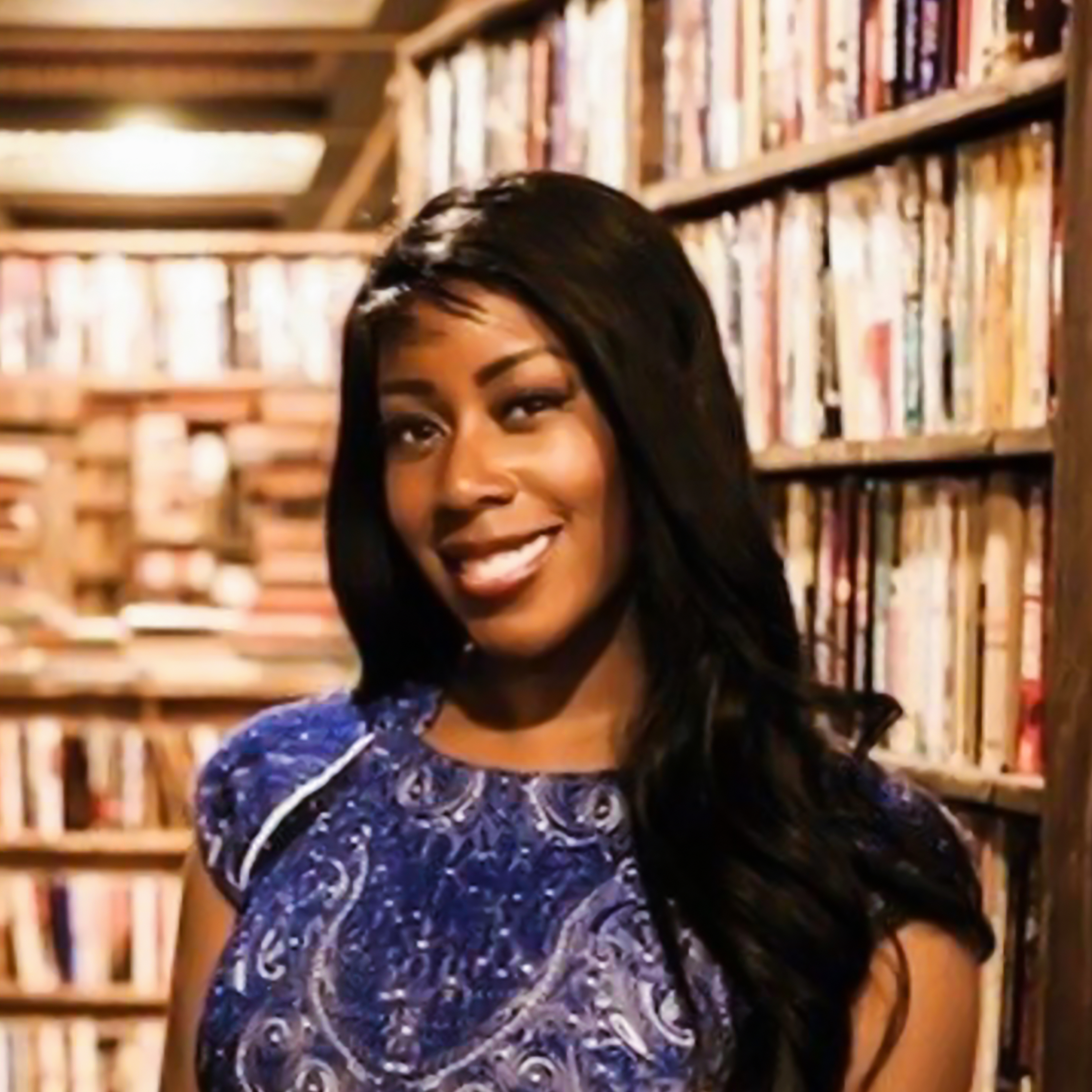
- Born: December 6, 1978 (age 47); Los Angeles, California, U.S.
- Education: Cal State Long Beach (BA); Trinity Law School (JD); University of California, Riverside (MFA)
- Spouse: Lee Saunders (m. 2002)
- Children: 2
- Writing career
- Period: 2016–present
- Genres: Literary fiction
- Notable work: Grace: A Novel
- Notable awards: PEN America Fellow (2010), Best Debut Fiction Award, American Library Association, Black Caucus (2017)
- Website: NatashiaDeon.com

Natashia Deón (born December 6, 1978) is an American novelist, attorney, and activist. She was an NAACP Image Awards Nominee for her debut novel, Grace, which also won the 2017 American Library Association's Black Caucus Award for Best Debut Fiction and was named one of The New York Times Critics’ Top Books of 2016 by critic Jennifer Senior. Her second novel, The Perishing, was released on November 1, 2022 and received many accolades including being on multiple lists for favorite books of 2022.

== Education and career ==
=== Law career ===
Deón graduated from high school at 16, finished her undergraduate degree from Cal State Long Beach at 19, and moved on to graduate from Trinity Law School with her law doctorate while still in her early 20s. She started practicing corporate law which took her to San Francisco, London, and Los Angeles. In 2010, she shifted her legal career to become a criminal defense attorney. In 2018, she founded the REDEEMED Project, which paired writers and lawyers with those convicted of crimes in order to help clear their criminal records and help them reenter society.

=== Writing and teaching career ===
Aside from her debut novel’s critical acclaim, Grace has also been translated into Mandarin. Deón completed her MFA from UC Riverside, Palm Desert, was a PEN America Fellow. She teaches writing at UCLA and Antioch University and is a speaker with Blue Flower Arts, a literary speaking agency. She also founded the LA-based Dirty Laundry Lit reading series that was "equal parts party and reading."

=== Activism ===
In addition to her REDEEMED Project activism, in 2017, Deón was a U.S. Delegate to Armenia as part of the U.S. Embassy’s reconciliation efforts between Turkey and Armenia.
