= Alexandra Lapierre =

French writer

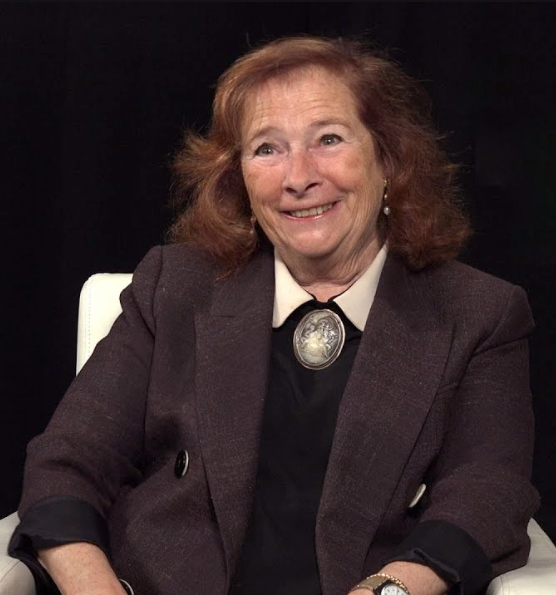
- In a 2025 interview
- Education: Sorbonne; American Film Institute; University of Southern California
- Occupation: Writer
- Known for: novels, biographies, and short stories

Alexandra Lapierre is a French author of novels, biographies, and short stories.

== Early life and education ==
Alexandra Lapierre is the daughter of the French writer and philanthropist Dominique Lapierre. After graduating from the Sorbonne, Lapierre studied at the American Film Institute and then enrolled at the University of Southern California, where she learned storytelling.

== Critical reception ==
A review by Autumn Stephens in the San Francisco Chronicle describes Fanny Stevenson: A Romance of Destiny as a "provocative, highly readable biography." Brenda Maddox writes in a review of Fanny Stevenson for The Washington Post that Lapierre "offers dialogue as well as smells, inner thoughts, even hand gestures, in such minute detail that even her subjects could not verify them were they to rise from the grave for interviews." Jill Rachlin writes in a review for The New York Times that "Though a 1994 biography of Robert Louis Stevenson by Frank McLynn suggested that his wife, Fanny, favored Hyde rather than Jekyll in disposition, the novelist Alexandra Lapierre paints a far more compassionate portrait of her tempestuous subject in the wide-ranging and entertaining 'Fanny Stevenson.'" A review by Publishers Weekly states, "Though some readers may demur at the highly novelistic approach and effusive prose, Lapierre provides ballast by creating dialogue from lines taken from the couple's letters and Robert's essays."

A Publishers Weekly review of Artemisia says the novel "succeeds more as history than as literature, but it makes history very hard to put down." A review by Peter Bricklebank for The New York Times describes the novel as "enthralling," and states that it "employs admirable artistry in depicting the turbulent life and times of two great painters."

A New York Times article by Stephanie Rosenbloom describes Women Travelers: A Century of Trailblazing Adventures 1850-1950 as "rich" with stories of women traveling on their own. Rosenbloom writes, "Some set off in corsets and crinolines, some in bloomers, others dressed like men. Ms. Lapierre categorized them, though not by their motherhood status," and quotes Lapierre: "What do they all share - across space and time - all these women with their very different personalities? One special talent, at the very least: to recognize their own instincts, to nurture their own desires. And not let anyone - nor any thing, any idea, any fear - lead them astray or starve their souls."

Kirkus Reviews writes that The Woman of a Thousand Names is a "massive novel, based on the life of a real woman," and "represents a huge amount of research by Lapierre," and that "this account is engrossing, especially as to the particulars of existence in a paranoid, post-revolutionary state with a bureaucratic machine as deadly as it is dysfunctional." A Publishers Weekly review states, "Lapierre evokes Moura’s appeal by moving between the impressions she makes on others, including Gorky and H.G. Wells, and her own deep feelings, meshing history with a captivating tale of a passionate heart."

== Honors and awards ==
- 1994 Elle Magazine Literary Grand Prize in France
- 2005 Chevalier in the Ordre des Arts et des Lettres
- 2009 Prix des romancières
- 2016 Madame Figaro's Grand Prix de l'Héroïne

== Selected bibliography ==
- La Lionne du Boulevard (1984) ISBN 978-2221010181
- Fanny Stevenson: A Romance of Destiny (1995) ISBN 978-0786701278
- Artemisia (2000) ISBN 978-0099581697
- Women Travelers: A Century of Trailblazing Adventures 1850-1950 (2007), co-authored with Christel Mouchard ISBN 978-2080300188
- Between Love and Honor (2012) ISBN 978-1611091458
- The Woman of a Thousand Names (2020) ISBN 978-1501197918
