= The Personal Librarian =

2021 historical fiction novel

- Cover of The Personal Librarian
- Author: Marie Benedict and Victoria Christopher Murray
- Language: English
- Genre: Historical fiction
- Publisher: Berkeley Books
- Publication date: June 29, 2021
- Media type: Print (hardcover, paperback), audiobook
- Pages: 352
- ISBN: 978-0593101537 Hardcover edition

The Personal Librarian tells of the lifework of Belle da Costa Greene, the personal librarian to J. P. Morgan, as well as the first director of the Morgan Library & Museum. The book, co-written by Marie Benedict and Victoria Christopher Murray, was published June 2021 by Berkley Books.

The novel follows Belle da Costa Greene as she receives employment from J. P. Morgan and establishes herself in high society while disguising her true identity as a person of color in the early twentieth century. In her time working for J. P. Morgan, she became hugely successful as she purchased rare manuscripts to build Morgan's collection. The novel also speaks to Belle's personal life as she struggles with her identity and the historical context in which she lives.

== Background ==
Co-author Marie Benedict learned about Belle da Costa Greene while she was still working as a lawyer. While she was visiting New York’s Morgan Library, a docent shared information with her about da Costa Greene, starting Benedict's fascination with the historical figure. Although Benedict was interested in writing about da Costa Greene for decades, she didn't feel comfortable with the endeavor "it did not feel right or appropriate for her to try and tell the story of a Black woman without a Black woman."

Benedict read a work by co-author Victoria Christopher Murray and immediately wanted to try writing da Costa Greene's story with her. Murray, a Black woman, was able to add personal information to the story given that her grandmother, who had lived in a similar time period as da Costa Greene, had also been able to pass as white. Speaking of their partnership, Murray told The Washington Post, "I do not believe that a Black woman could have done justice to Belle, just as I believe a White woman couldn’t have done her justice either. We had to find a way to blend these two lives together for her and that’s what I think we did."

Benedict and Murray finished the first draft of the novel and submitted it to their editor as the COVID-19 pandemic began, altering the expected publication process.

== Reception ==
The Personal Librarian was a top book club pick in November 2021, March 2022, and April 2022.

In 2021, the book was named a "Favorites of Favorites" by Library Reads, as well as one of Booklist's top ten historical fiction novels. It was also nominated for the Goodreads Choice Award for Historical Fiction.

The book received starred reviews from Booklist and Library Journal, as well as positive reviews from news outlets.

In her starred review for Booklist, Donna Seaman wrote, "Every element of this blockbuster historical novel is compelling and revelatory, beginning with the bedazzling protagonist based with awestruck care on Belle da Costa Greene." Pamela O'Sullivan's starred review for Library Journal stated, "This fictional account of Greene’s life feels authentic; the authors bring to life not only Belle but all those around her. An excellent piece of historical fiction that many readers will find hard to put down."

Publishers Weekly reviewed the book positively, noting that "Benedict and Murray do a great job capturing Belle’s passion and tenacity as she carves a place for herself in a racist male-dominated society."

Writing for The Christian Science Monitor, Heather McAlpin noted that Benedict and Murray's "teamwork has yielded an engrossing, well-researched read, which the authors assure us is anchored in 'the available facts,'" though "[l]iberties have, of course, been taken."

Contrary to popular opinion, Kirkus Reviews proffered The Personal Librarian a mixed review, stating, "Though instructive about both the Morgan collection and racial injustice, the book is exposition-laden and its dialogue is stilted—the characters, particularly Belle, tend to declaim rather than discuss." They further criticized the way the authors filled-in aspects of Belle's life given the lack of historical records regarding many personal details included in the book.
