= The Vanishing Half =

2020 novel by Brit Bennett

- Cover of first edition
- Author: Brit Bennett
- Audio read by: Shayna Small
- Cover artist: Lauren Peters-Collaer
- Language: English
- Genre: Historical fiction; family saga; mystery
- Publisher: Riverhead Books
- Publication date: June 2, 2020
- Publication place: New York
- Media type: Print (hardcover and paperback), ebook, audiobook
- Pages: 352 pp
- ISBN: 978-0-525-53629-1 (First edition hardcover)
- OCLC: 1119471005
- Dewey Decimal: 813/.6
- LC Class: PS3602.E66444 V36 2020

The Vanishing Half is a historical fiction novel by American author Brit Bennett. It is her second novel and was published by Riverhead Books in 2020. The novel debuted at number one on The New York Times fiction best-seller list. HBO acquired the rights to develop a limited series with Bennett as executive producer. The Vanishing Half garnered acclaim from book critics, and Emily Temple of Literary Hub noted that in 2020 it was the book most frequently listed among the year's best, making 25 lists.

== Synopsis ==
The Vanishing Half is a multi-generational family saga set from the 1940s–1990s and centers on identical twin sisters Desiree and Estelle "Stella" Vignes and their daughters Jude and Kennedy, respectively. Desiree and Stella are black and have exceptionally light skin. They are raised in the fictional town of Mallard, Louisiana where the residents are exclusively people with light skin. Desiree and Stella witness the lynching of their father in the 1940s and feel discontent living in Mallard where there are few opportunities for them. A formative moment for the twins is when their mother Adele pulls them out of school so they can earn money cleaning a family's home. Stella is sexually abused by the man who owns the home and conceals this from her family. In 1954, at the age of 16, the twins decide to run away to New Orleans. Stella begins to pass for white so she can work as a secretary at a marketing firm called Maison Blanche. Her wealthy boss, Blake, falls for her, and she moves to California with him without telling Desiree. Desiree is left heartbroken and ends up in an abusive marriage to a man named Sam Winston.

Stella and Blake get married and live in an affluent, white neighborhood in Los Angeles, California. They have a daughter named Kennedy who dreams of becoming an actress. In order to maintain the facade she's built, Stella has to pretend to be white for the rest of her life. She lies to Blake and Kennedy by telling them that all of her family members are dead. Kennedy ends up dropping out of college to pursue a career in acting, and she has a troubled relationship with her mother who she knows is lying about her background.

Meanwhile, Desiree leaves an abusive marriage and moves away from Washington, D.C. to return to Mallard with her eight-year-old daughter Jude. Since Desiree's ex-husband has dark skin, Jude has dark skin as well. Growing up in Mallard is hard for Jude, as she is ridiculed for her dark complexion. Jude eventually moves to Los Angeles and attends the University of California, Los Angeles on a track scholarship. She falls in love with a transgender man named Reese while in college and eventually gets a job as a caterer to help him save for his transition surgery. While working part-time as a caterer in Beverly Hills, Jude sees a woman who appears to be her mother's doppelgänger. The woman is her aunt Stella whom she's never met.

Jude later meets Kennedy at a local theater since Kennedy is in the same play as Jude's friend Barry. Kennedy is disliked by most people at the theater because of her entitlement and lack of care for others. Jude figures out that Kennedy is Stella's daughter, and she eventually tells Kennedy the secret of her mother's identity. Jude also confronts Stella about her true identity when she comes to watch one of Kennedy's plays, causing Stella to flee.

At the novel's end, Jude is in medical school, and she ends up with Reese who is finally able to get his transition surgery. Kennedy's relatively unsuccessful career in acting comes to an end, and she becomes a real estate agent. Kennedy and Stella continue to have a rocky relationship, as Kennedy knows that her mother will never be truthful with her. Desiree ends up with a man named Early who is a private investigator and bondsman, and together, they take care of the twins' mom Adele who has dementia.

The novel has a nonlinear narrative structure.

== Themes ==
Colorism

Bennett explores the issue of colorism throughout the book. In the novel, an ex-slave named Alphonse Decuir established a town called Mallard for only light-skinned people. This leads to a fixation among the town about lightness coupled by a disgust for dark-skinned people. Jude, who is the daughter of the main character, is bullied for the darker color of her skin in school and is called names such as "Tar Baby" and "Blueskin." The townspeople also view Desiree's relationship with Early, who is a dark skinned man, as unfathomable because to them dark-skinned people were undesirable. Throughout Desiree and Stella's childhood, their mother Adele warns them against dark-skinned men. The book explores the effects of colorism and the lengths people go to in order to be accepted as beautiful or lighter.

Domestic abuse

Domestic abuse is another theme of the book as it manifests in the main character Desiree's struggles with abuse from her darker-skinned husband Sam. In the novel, Sam physically and emotionally abuses Desiree until she eventually runs away with her daughter Jude back to Mallard. On some occasions, Desiree tries to rationalize the abuse from her husband and attributes it to his frustrations with the assassination of Martin Luther King Jr., as well as the riots that erupted around that time and his desire to have another child. It highlights how domestic violence victims often try to rationalize the actions of their abusers and are reluctant to leave them.

Performance and acting

Performance, particularly in regards to identity, is a central theme of the novel. Characters like Kennedy and Barry only perform temporarily on the stage, with Kennedy performing in plays and movies, and Barry performing in drag. But other characters in the novel perform daily to control society's view of them. Stella is the most obvious example of this constant performance. Rather than getting easier over time, passing is an enduring struggle for Stella throughout the novel. In order for her to maintain her facade, she can never be fully honest with herself or others. Stella's performance becomes so intense that she ends up perpetuating racism even more than her white counterparts. She is reminded of the precarious nature of her performance any time she encounters a black person like her neighbor Loretta Walker. What if they recognize her from her past life or can somehow tell that she is black also? Bennett's novel blurs the line between performance and authenticity.

Passing

Bennett's novel also delves into the complexities of racial passing. In many novels, like Nella Larsen's Passing, passing is displayed through a primarily negative lens. Bennett's novel explores passing through the character of Stella who does not regret her decision to pass and despite what it's cost her, chooses it again at the end of the novel. Bennett's novel conveys the many reasons why people chose to pass in a Jim Crow society. Many people simply wanted to escape the painful realities of racial degradation and prejudices. Stella's decision to pass causes emotional turmoil for her, but it also allows her to escape her hometown where she is virtually stagnant and unable to pursue her dreams.

== Reception ==
The novel debuted at number one on The New York Times fiction best-seller list for the week ending June 6, 2020. As of the week ending April 24, 2021, the novel has spent 42 weeks on the list.

Publishers Weekly wrote, "Bennett renders her characters and their struggles with great compassion, and explores the complicated state of mind that Stella finds herself in while passing as white." In its starred review, Kirkus Reviews wrote, "The scene in which Stella adopts her white persona is a tour de force of doubling and confusion." The Washington Post called The Vanishing Half a "fierce examination of contemporary passing and the price so many pay for a new identity". The New York Times wrote, "Bennett balances the literary demands of dynamic characterisation with the historical and social realities of her subject matter."

In a mixed review for The New York Times, author Ayana Mathis wrote, "The novel fails to imagine meaningful story lines or compelling links between the young women and their mothers' burdens. As a result, their sections struggle to find momentum and weight."

It was selected for The New York Times Book Review's "10 Best Books of 2020" list. Former United States President Barack Obama included the novel on his list of favourite books of 2020.

== Awards and honors ==
Year	Award	Category	Result	Ref.
2020	Goodreads Choice Awards	Historical Fiction	Won	
2020	National Book Award	Fiction	Longlisted	
2020	Prix Médicis	étranger	Shortlisted	
2021	Andrew Carnegie Medal for Excellence	Fiction	Longlisted	
2021	Orwell Prize	Political Fiction	Longlisted	
2021	Women's Prize for Fiction	—	Shortlisted	

== Television adaptation ==
Within a month of publication it was reported that HBO had acquired the rights in the "low seven-figures" to develop a limited series with Brit Bennett as executive producer. In February 2021, it was reported that Aziza Barnes and Jeremy O. Harris will both write and produce the adaptation. Issa Rae was also named as an executive producer. On June 24, 2022, O. Harris left the series as writer and executive producer.
