= Victoria Christopher Murray =

American author

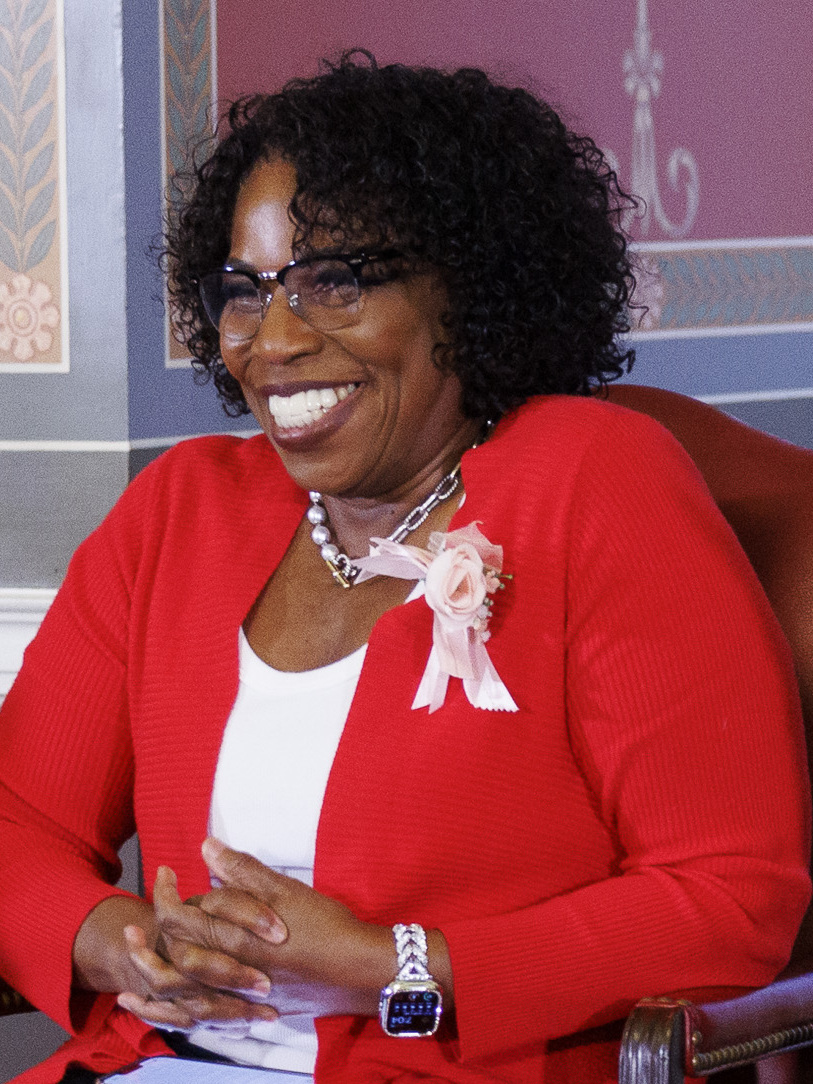
- Murray in 2024
- Born: New York City, U.S.
- Education: Hampton University (BA); New York University Stern School of Business (MBA)
- Occupations: Author; editor
- Writing career
- Notable work: The Personal Librarian (2021)
- Notable awards: NAACP Image Award for Outstanding Literary Work – Fiction (2016)

Victoria Christopher Murray is an American editor and author of over 30 books, with "more than one million books in print."

== Personal life and education ==
Murray was born in Queens, New York. She received a Bachelor of Arts in Communication Disorders from Hampton University and a Master of Business Administration from New York University Stern School of Business. She is a member of Delta Sigma Theta.

Murray now spends her time in Washington, D.C. and Los Angeles.

== Career ==
After working in business for ten years, Murray launched a financial services agency for Aegon, USA, where she worked for nine years.

Murray published her first book, Temptation, in 1997. As she continued writing, she became known for her Christian fiction geared toward African American readers, though the genre didn't exist when she published Temptation. Murray stated, "I knew that I wanted to write a book that was entertaining, compelling and put God in the middle and still have the book be a page-turner." Later, Murray explained that she hated the "Christian fiction label," saying, "I think it limits our readership ... I’m not writing for people who are already in church. If I had to say who I was trying to gain, it’s people who never entered a church.”

Since her Temptation, Murray has published over 30 novels.

In 2014, Murray launched Brown Girls Publishing alongside ReShonda Tate Billingsley.

Murray has partnered with Marie Benedict and written several historical fiction novels featuring Black women that won several honors. The 2021 publication of The Personal Librarian earned the "Favorites of Favorites" by Library Reads, a place in Booklist's top ten historical fiction novels, and nominated for the Goodreads Choice Award for Historical Fiction. Further, The Washington Post named it as a notable book of the year. Their second collaboration, The First Ladies, was named a Target book of the year 2023 and named a 'Best book of the year 2023' by Christian Science Monitor. Their third collaboration entitled A Pair of Aces, published in 2026, earned a selection to Reese's Book Club.

== Awards ==
Awards for Murray's writing
Year	Award	Result	Ref.
2001	NAACP Image Award for Outstanding Literary Work	Nominee	
2006	Phillis Wheatley Award for Trailblazer in Contemporary Fiction	Winner	
2006	Tabahani Book Club Author of the Decade		
2007	African American Literary Award for Best Christian Fiction		
2008	African American Literary Award for Best Christian Fiction		
2008	African American Literary Award for Author of the Year		
2009	African American Literary Award for Best Young Adult Fiction		
2009	African American Literary Award for Best Christian Fiction		
2010	Romance Slam Glam, Best Inspirational Romance		
2010	African American Literary Award for Best Christian Fiction		
2013	NAACP Image Award for Outstanding Literary Work – Fiction	Nominee	
2014	NAACP Image Award for Outstanding Literary Work – Fiction	Nominee	
2015	African American Literary Award for Best Fiction		
2015	African American Literary Award for Author of the Year		
2016	NAACP Image Award for Outstanding Literary Work – Fiction	Nominee	
2016	NAACP Image Award for Outstanding Literary Work – Fiction	Winner	
2017	African American Literary Award for Best Christian Fiction		
2017	African American Literary Award for Lifetime Achievement		
2017	Go On Girl Book Club's Author of the Year		
2018	NAACP Image Award for Outstanding Literary Work – Fiction	Nominee	

== Publications ==
=== Adult novels ===
- Joy (2001)
- Truth Be Told (2004)
- Grown Folks Business (2005)
- The Deal, the Dance, and the Devil (2011)
- Destiny's Divas (2012)
- Never Say Never (2013)
- Touched by an Angel, co-authored with Princess FL Gooden (2014)
- Stand Your Ground (2015)
- It Should've Been Me, co-authored with ReShonda Tate Billingsley (2016)
- If Only For One Night, co-authored with ReShonda Tate Billingsley (2018)
- The Personal Librarian, co-authored with Marie Benedict (2021)
- The First Ladies, co-authored with Marie Benedict (2023)
- Harlem Rhapsody (2025)
- A Pair of Aces, co-authored with Marie Benedict (2026) ISBN 979-8217349234

==== The Ex Files ====
- The Ex Files (2007)
- Merry Ex-Mas (2013)
- Forever an Ex (2014)

==== Jasmine series (1997-2017) ====
- Temptation (1997)
- A Sin and a Shame (2006)
- Too Little, Too Late (2008)
- Lady Jasmine (2009)
- Sins of the Mother (2010)
- Scandalous (2012)
- Sinners & Saints, co-authored with ReShonda Tate Billingsley (2012)
- Friends & Foes, co-authored with ReShonda Tate Billingsley (2013)
- Fortune & Fame, co-authored with ReShonda Tate Billingsley (2014)
- A Blessing & A Curse, co-authored with ReShonda Tate Billingsley (2017)
- Temptation: The Aftermath (2017)

==== Seven Deadly Sins series (2017-2021) ====
- Lust (2017)
- Envy (2018)
- Greed (2019)
- Wrath (2021)

=== Teen novels ===
==== Divas series ====
- Diamond (2008)
- India (2008)
- Veronique (2009)
- Aaliyah (2009)
