= Brit Bennett =

American writer

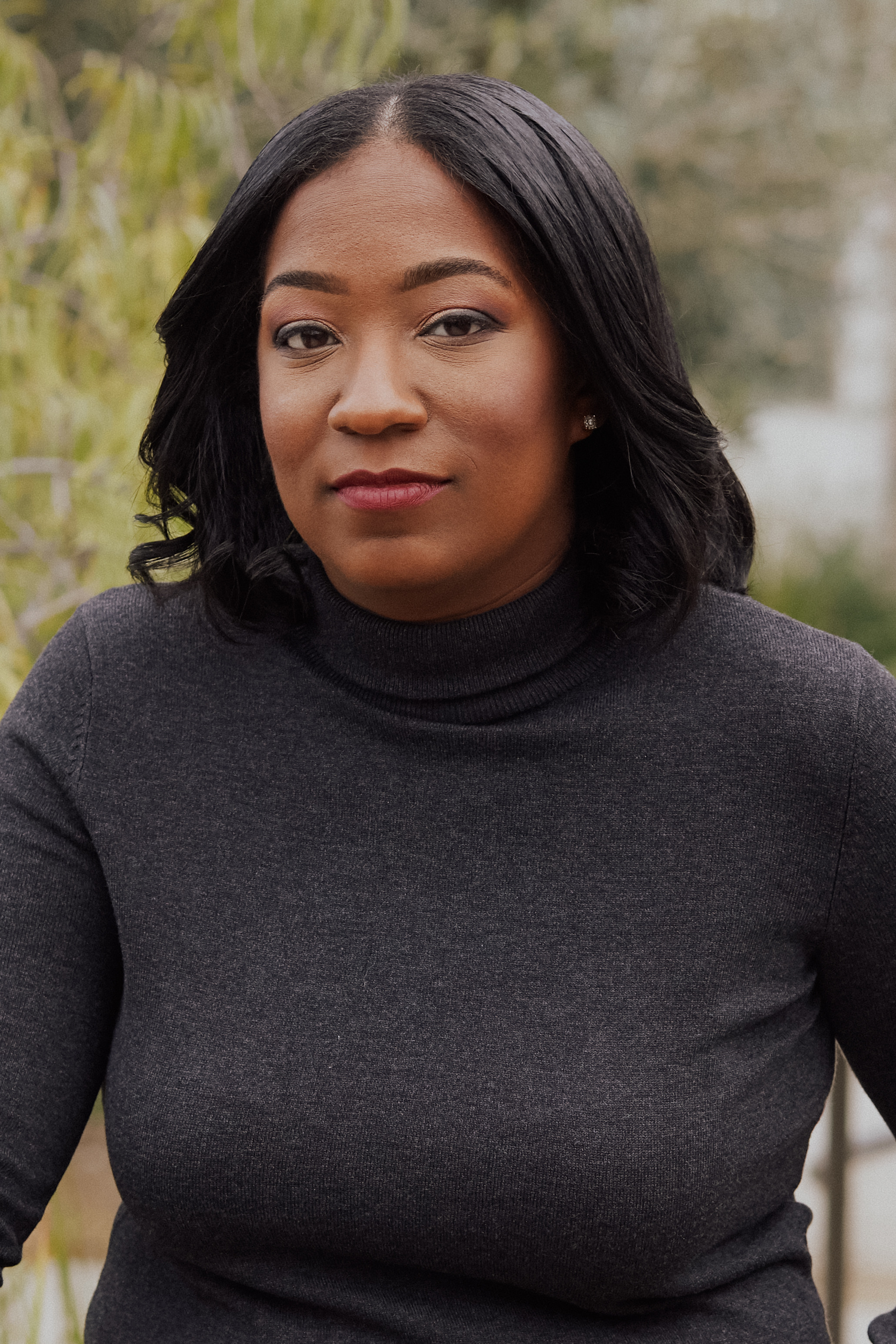
- Born: 1989 or 1990 (age 36–37); Oceanside, California, U.S.
- Education: Stanford University (BA); University of Michigan (MFA)
- Occupation: Writer
- Writing career
- Notable works: "I Don't Know What to Do With Good White People" (2014); The Mothers (2016); The Vanishing Half (2020)
- Website: britbennett.com

Brit Bennett is an American writer based in Los Angeles. Her debut novel The Mothers (2016) was a New York Times best-seller. Her second novel, The Vanishing Half (2020), was also a New York Times best-seller, and was chosen as a Good Morning America Book Club selection. The Vanishing Half was selected as one of The New York Times' ten best books of 2020, and was shortlisted for the 2021 Women's Prize for Fiction.

== Early life ==
Bennett was raised in Southern California and earned an undergraduate degree in English from Stanford University. She later attended the University of Michigan for her MFA. She also studied at University of Oxford.

== Career ==
While she was completing her MFA at the University of Michigan, Bennett's 2014 essay for Jezebel, "I Don't Know What to Do With Good White People" gained considerable attention, generating over one million views in three days. While at Michigan, she also won a Hopwood Award in Graduate Short Fiction as well as the 2014 Hurston/Wright Award for College Writers.

She has since published other nonfiction essays, including a history of black dolls called "Addy Walker, American Girl" for The Paris Review, as well as a review of the 2015 Ta-Nehisi Coates book Between the World and Me for The New Yorker. Vogue said Bennett's nonfiction essays "recall Ta-Nehisi Coates [with] a similar ability to contextualize the present moment in a bigoted past."

=== The Mothers ===
In 2016, Riverhead Books published Bennett's debut novel The Mothers to critical acclaim. A New York Times best-seller, the Times said The Mothers was "shaping up to be one of the fall’s biggest literary debuts, with an initial printing of 108,000 copies and starred reviews in Booklist, Library Journal and Publishers Weekly." Bennett was named in the National Book Foundation "5 under 35" list of promising debut novelists. The novel was nominated for the 2016 Goodreads Choice Awards for Debut Goodreads Author. In March 2017, it was reported that The Mothers had been tapped by Warner Bros. for a film adaptation, with Kerry Washington as a producer.

=== The Vanishing Half ===
In 2020, Bennett's second book The Vanishing Half was published by Riverhead Books, reaching the number-one spot on The New York Times best-seller list in June. It was a Good Morning America Book Club selection. The Vanishing Half was named as one of The New York Times' ten best books of 2020. The novel was shortlisted for the 2021 Women's Prize for Fiction and won the 2020 Goodreads Choice Award for Historical Fiction. The Washington Post called The Vanishing Half a "fierce examination of contemporary passing and the price so many pay for a new identity." Within a month of publication it was reported that HBO had acquired the rights for "low seven-figures" to develop a limited series, with Bennett as executive producer.

=== American Girl ===
In 2022, Bennett worked with American Girl to create a new character in their "Historical Characters" line, a Black girl named Claudie Wells growing up in 1922 during the Harlem Renaissance. The American Girl team approached Bennett about writing for them after seeing her tweets about wanting to write an American Girl book. She has said that she was a fan of the American Girl book series and dolls as a child, especially the character of Addy, and the book series written by Connie Porter. She collaborated with a board of researchers and historians to create the character and her stories. She has written two books in this series, Meet Claudie (2022) and Adventures with Claudie (2023).

== Bibliography ==
- —— (2016). The Mothers: A Novel. New York: Riverhead Books. ISBN 978-0399184529.
- —— (2020). The Vanishing Half (1st ed hardcover ed.). New York: Riverhead Books. p. 352. ISBN 978-0525536291.
- —— (2022). Meet Claudie: An American Girl; 1922. American Girl. p. 91. ISBN 9781683372028.
- —— (2023). Adventures with Claudie: An American Girl; 1922. American Girl. p. 112. ISBN 9781683372080.
