= Akemi =

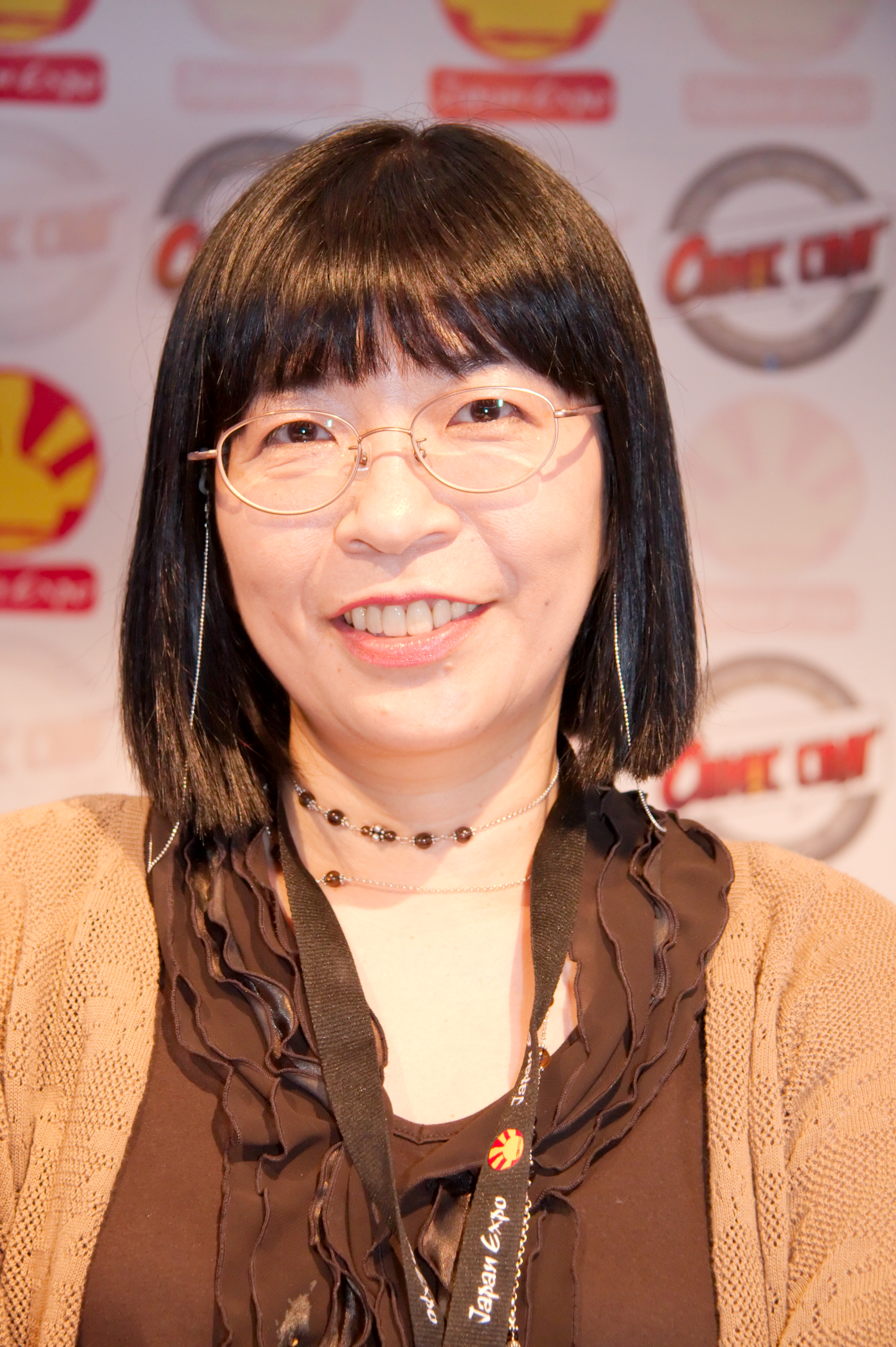
- Akemi Takada, Japanese artist and illustrator
- Pronunciation: akemi (IPA)
- Gender: Both

Origin
- Origin: Japanese
- Meaning: Different meanings depending on the kanji used
- Region of origin: Japanese

Akemi is a unisex Japanese given name.

== Written forms ==
Akemi can be written using different kanji characters and can mean:

- 明美, "bright, beauty"
- 明実, "bright, fruit"
- 明海, "bright, sea"
- 明巳, "bright, sign of the snake (Chinese zodiac)"
- 朱美, "vermilion, beauty"
- 朱未, "vermilion, not yet"
- 朱実, "vermilion, fruit"
- 暁美, "dawn, beauty"
- 曙覧, "daybreak, view"

The name can also be written in hiragana あけみ or katakana アケミ.

== Notable people with the name ==
- Akemi Darenogare (ダレノガレ 明美; born 1990), Japanese fashion model and television personality
- Akemi Dawn Bowman, American author
- Akemi Ishii (石井 明美; born 1965), Japanese singer
- Akemi Iwata (岩田 明美; born 1954), Japanese former football player
- Akemi Kanda (神田 朱未; born 1978), Japanese voice actress
- Akemi Kato (加藤 明美; born 1970), Japanese field hockey player
- Akemi Masuda (増田 明美; born 1964), Japanese marathon runner
- Akemi Matsunae (松苗 あけみ; born 1956), Japanese manga artist
- Akemi Matsuno (松野 明美; born 1968), Japanese marathon runner
- Akemi Morikawa (森川 明美; born 1967), Japanese fencer
- Akemi Morimoto (森本 朱美; born 1968), Japanese cyclist
- Akemi Negishi (根岸 明美; 1934–2008), Japanese actress
- Akemi Nishiya (born 1965), Japanese former professional tennis player
- Akemi Niwa (丹羽 明美; born 1973), Japanese curler
- Akemi Noda (野田 朱美; born 1969), Japanese football player
- Akemi Okamura (岡村 明美; born 1969), Japanese voice actress and narrator
- Akemi Okazato (岡里 明美; born 1974), Japanese basketball player
- Akemi Satō (singer) (佐藤 朱美; born 1972), Japanese singer
- Akemi Satō (voice actress) (佐藤 朱; born 1980), Japanese voice actress
- Akemi Sugiyama (杉山 明美; born 1965), Japanese volleyball player
- Akemi Tachibana (橘 曙覧; 1812–1868), male Japanese poet and classical scholar
- Akemi Takada (高田 明美; born 1955), Japanese artist and illustrator
- Akemi Taniguchi (谷口 明見; born 1937), Japanese Nordic combined skier
- Akemi Yamada (山田 朱未; born 1980), Japanese professional shogi player
- Akemi Yokoyama (born 1999), Mexican professional footballer

== Fictional characters ==
- Akemi (朱美), a character in the manga series Vagabond
- Akemi (明美), a character in the video game Red Ninja: End of Honor
- Akemi, a character in the television series Xena: Warrior Princess
- Akemi (アケミ), a character in the manga series Saikano
- Akemi Kinoshita (木下 明美), a character in the cell phone novel Ōsama Game
- Akemi Miyano (宮野 明美), a character in the manga series Case Closed
- Akemi Nakajima (中島 朱実), protagonist of the novel series Digital Devil Story and its video game adaption, Digital Devil Story: Megami Tensei
- Akemi Nakamura, a character in Sister Souljah's books, Midnight: A Gangster Love Story and Midnight and the Meaning of Love
- Akemi Roppongi (六本木 朱美), a character in the manga series Maison Ikkoku
- Akemi Sumizome (墨染 朱美), a character in the manga series Inari, Konkon, Koi Iroha
- Akemi Togawa (戸川 アケミ), a character in the 1966 film The War of the Gargantuas
- Akemi Yajima (矢島 明美), a character in the manga series Salaryman Kintarō
- Akemi Aizawa (相沢 あけみ), a character in the manga series Tomo-chan Is a Girl!
- Akemi, a character in David Mack's comic book series Kabuki
- Akemi Suzaku (朱雀 アケミ), a character in the anime series Great Pretender
- Homura Akemi (暁美 ほむら), a character in the anime series Puella Magi Madoka Magica
