= Flyy Girl =

1993 book by Omar Tyree

- Author: Omar Tyree
- Language: English
- Genre: Young adult literature
- Published: 1993
- Publisher: Mars Productions; Simon & Schuster
- Publication place: United States

Flyy Girl is young adult/new adult literature and an urban fiction book written by Omar Tyree. The book was originally published by Mars Productions in 1993 and republished by Simon & Schuster for adults in 1996. The novel is regarded to be the genesis of the modern urban-fiction/street-lit movement that would later gain momentum in 1999 with the publication of Sister Souljah's The Coldest Winter Ever.

== Summary ==
Flyy Girl is an African-American coming-of-age story that follows Tracy Ellison from her sixth-birthday party in 1977 to her 17th birthday. Tracy grows up in the middle-class Philadelphia suburb of Germantown. The daughter of a dietitian and pharmacist, Tracy is beautiful, intelligent, and armed with self-esteem and a sassy mouth. Tracy is also boy crazy, which leads to sex in the indulgent, hip-hop 1980s and the effects of the cocaine economy plaguing black communities. Scholarly analysis of the novel has examined how Tracy's appearance and clothing reflect broader expectations surrounding Black women's behavior and gender roles.

== Sequels ==
Tyree wrote two sequels to Flyy Girl: For the Love of Money (2001) and Boss Lady (2006). Both were published by Simon & Schuster.

== Film adaptation ==
In July 2013, Lionsgate Entertainment's CodeBlack Films had acquired the rights to Flyy Girl with hopes of transforming the novel into a feature film. In February 2015, CodeBlack Films announced that Dear White People producer Effie Brown was hired to produce a film adaptation of the novel. Brown and her company, Duly Noted Inc., will oversee the film's development alongside Codeblack Films' Jeff Clanagan and Quincy Newell.

On June 17, 2015, it was announced that Sanaa Lathan would star in and executive produce the film adaptation of Omar Tyree's trilogy that starts with Flyy Girl. Lathan will portray Tracy Ellison, a successful businesswoman and workaholic who believes that money is always the key to happiness. Geoffrey S. Fletcher was hired to write the script.
