= Nikki Turner =

Nikki or Nicki Turner may refer to:

- Nikki Turner (author), American author
- Nicki Turner (cricketer) (born 1959), New Zealand cricketer
- Nikki Turner (public health advocate), New Zealand scientist
