= Codeblack Films =

American entertainment company

- Type: Private
- Industry: Entertainment
- Founded: 2005
- Founder: Jeff Clanagan
- Headquarters: Santa Monica, California, United States
- Key people: Jeff Clanagan (CEO); Quincy Newell (EVP); Candice Wilson (Acquisitions & Development Executive Director)
- Products: Motion pictures
- Website: codeblack.com

Codeblack Films is an American entertainment company. Codeblack focuses on films targeting African-American audiences.

== History ==
Codeblack Enterprises was founded by Jeff Clanagan in 2005, who became CEO of the company. Originally focused on direct-to-video releases, Codeblack entered into an agreement with 20th Century Fox for film distribution. The multi-picture deal with Fox Faith was to produce six original films targeting the African-American faith-based market. The first two productions were film adaptations of the 1980s Off-Broadway gospel musical hit Mama, I Want to Sing! and the popular play, A Good Man is Hard to Find.

Codeblack Enterprises entered a distribution deal with Lionsgate in 2012 forming Codeblack Films under Lionsgate. Codeblack's first film release under Lionsgate was Kevin Hart's stand-up special Let Me Explain. That same year, Shaquille O'Neal's All Star Comedy Jam was released through Codeblack and Lionsgate. Codeblack released Woman Thou Art Loosed: On the 7th Day as a limited release to 102 AMC theaters in April 2012.

In 2013, Codeblack acquired the rights to produce films from the Flyy Girl book trilogy by Omar Tyree. It was later announced that Sanaa Lathan would be starring as Tracy Ellison in the movie adaptation written by Geoffrey S. Fletcher and Nicole Jefferson-Asher and produced by Effie T. Brown. Codeblack released Why We Laugh: Funny Women, a film about female comedians narrated and produced by Joan Rivers, in 2013. That same year, it acquired Frankie & Alice, a drama starring Halle Berry, after its delayed release. In April 2013, Codeblack acquired the theatrical rights of Free Angela and All Political Prisoners, a documentary about social activist Angela Davis. Also in 2013, Codeblack released the film The Inevitable Defeat of Mister & Pete, a story of two children on their which have been abandoned by their drug-addicted caretaker. The movie was directed by George Tillman Jr. and starred Jennifer Hudson, Anthony Mackie and Jeffrey Wright. It debuted at the Sundance Film Festival that year.

Codeblack released Repentance, a psychological thriller about a life coach who is abducted by one of his clients, in February 2014. The film was directed by Philippe Caland, who wrote the script alongside Shintaro Shimosawa and worked with Nina Yang Bongiovi to produce the film. The film Addicted was released by Codeblack in 2014. It was shown on a limited 846 screens. Codeblack signed an agreement with Times Media Films in October 2014 to distribute its films to South Africa.

In March 2015, Lionsgate's Codeblack Films entered an agreement with distributor Eagle Films to distribute all films produced or co-produced by Codeblack in the Middle East and North Africa. In March 2016, Codeblack's parent company, Lionsgate, announced a partnership with Kevin Hart and his company Hartbeat Digital to establish Laugh Out Loud, a video on demand service. Jeff Clanagan. Codeblack's CEO, became president of Hartbeat Digital and Laugh Out Loud. That same month, Codeblack produced a game show series on Instagram similar to "The Newlywed Game" called "The Perfect Match" before the release of the film, The Perfect Match. In September 2016, Codeblack announced that it was partnering with Queen Latifah's Flavor Unit Entertainment to co-produce and co-finance several films including The Love Playbook: Rules for Love, Sex, and Happiness based on the book by La La Anthony.

In April 2017, the first trailer was released for All Eyez on Me, a biopic about rapper Tupac Shakur distributed by Codeblack which would be released in June on what would have been his 46th birthday. The movie was featured as the closing film at the 2017 American Black Film Festival.

On January 11, 2019, Lionsgate announced the end of the partnership with Codeblack Films, while also being separated from the former company and continue to operated independently.
