= Akbar Pray =

American drug kingpin

Wayne B. Pray
- Born: March 22, 1948 (age 78); Newark, New Jersey, United States
- Other name: Akbar Pray
- Status: Time served release under First Step Act reduction in sentence provision ("compassionate release")
- Conviction: Sentenced January 12, 1990; life in prison without parole
- Criminal charges: Drug trafficking under federal drug kingpin statute (21 USC 848(b))

Akbar Pray (born Wayne B. Pray on March 22, 1948) is an American writer, columnist and convicted drug kingpin from Newark, New Jersey who was serving a life sentence in federal prison, imposed in 1990, before obtaining a "compassionate release" on September 30, 2024.

Pray headed operations that distributed millions of dollars' worth of cocaine and marijuana into Essex County, New Jersey from the early 1970s to the late 1980s.

The Pray organization called itself The Family, and consisted of more than 300 active members. In addition to its drug distribution networks, the group had been active in real estate ventures.

Once described as "untouchable" by law enforcement, Pray was indicted in the District of New Jersey under the federal Continuing Criminal Enterprise ("super-kingpin") statute, tried for seven months and convicted by a jury. He was sentenced by Judge John Bissell to the mandatory term of life without possibility of parole in 1990.

== Criminal career ==
Pray was born in Newark in 1948. Starting off as a street hustler, was soon operating a major drug ring.

== Arrest and conviction ==
On June 21, 1988, Pray and four subordinates were indicted under the federal drug kingpin statute. He was arrested that day in Boca Raton, Florida by federal authorities, accused of leading an organized cocaine and marijuana trafficking enterprise. Federal officials estimated that his organization distributed 341 kilos of cocaine and 354 kilos of marijuana in less than two years, grossing more than $4.5 million annually.

Evidence showed that Pray traveled throughout the United States, making deals and arranging for transportation of narcotics. He also traveled to Colombia and the West Indies to purchase his supply of cocaine.

His seven-month trial consisted of the testimony of 126 "document" witnesses, including hotel staff, car salesmen and retail clothing store employees. The testimony described Pray's extravagant spending and lifestyle, as part of the prosecution's "substantial wealth" case against him. The prosecution theory was that Pray made and spent copious amounts of money, far more than could be accounted for by legitimate means.

The jury convicted him on six of nine counts, including the most serious. On January 12, 1990, Pray was sentenced under the federal drug kingpin statute to life in prison without parole, along with various concurrent terms. In the event of release, the sentence provided for three years of supervision.

== Prison activities ==
In prison, Pray wrote the book "The Death of the Game", which warns youth of the detrimental realities associated with street life. He was also a columnist and regular contributor to Don Diva magazine, a contributing writer to Nikki Turner's "Tales From Da Hood" and co-author of "The Street Chronicles" with Nikki Turner. Pray also served as Editor in Chief of Gangster Chronicles. Pray's CD "Akbar Speaks" invaded the mix tape circuit and allowed Pray's voice to be heard via a medium relevant to today's youth.

Pray is the CEO and Founder of the non-profit organization Akbar Pray's Foundation For Change (APFFC). APFFC is dedicated to re-directing the lives of at-risk urban youth.

== Health and Release ==
Pray was serving his life sentence at FMC Butner, a medical prison facility in Butner, North Carolina. Pray has hypertension, prostate disease, and glaucoma. He is blind in one eye. While in prison, he received double hip replacement surgery.

With the assistance of attorneys Peter Goldberger and Isaac Wright Jr., Pray obtained reduction in sentence from U.S. District Judge Claire Cecchi to time served (more than 36 years), coupled with an increased supervision term of six years, under the "compassionate release" provision of the First Step Act. Pray was released on September 30, 2024. He returned to Newark, NJ, to live.
