= The Family (American crime organization) =

African-American organized crime group

- Founded by: Akbar Pray
- Founding location: Newark, New Jersey, United States
- Years active: 1970-1995
- Territory: New Jersey, Newark, New Jersey
- Ethnicity: African-American
- Membership (est.): More than 300 active members
- Leader: Akbar Pray

The Family was an organized crime group known for drug trafficking. The Family was founded by Akbar Pray in Newark, New Jersey in the early 1970s, and collapsed several years after he was sentenced to life in prison in 1990.

== History ==
The Family was headed by Wayne (Akbar) Pray for nearly 20 years until 1989, when he was sentenced to life in federal prison without the opportunity for parole. Pray was convicted for being the "principal administrator" of a substantial cocaine importing and distribution organization. At its height, Pray's group had about 300 members and associates.

For several years, New Jersey's State Commission of Investigation (SCI or Commission) had developed intelligence on Afro-lineal mobs. These efforts culminated in a public hearing on November 29, 1990. The Afro-Lineal Organized Crime Report summarizes the public hearing. Newark Police Director Claude M. Coleman testified at the SCI public hearing as to the difficulties encountered in investigating Pray:

For some years ... [Pray] was considered to be one of the so-called untouchables, because he never came close to the [narcotics]. He was leading the life of wealth and influence, [but] I think everyone knew that he was involved in drug dealing .... Nonetheless, he had not been ... brought to justice, so to speak.

Director Coleman related how Pray built up The Family through "fear, intimidation and violence," directed primarily against rivals for the drug trade. Although the group has continued after Pray's incarceration, Director Coleman described it as "fragmented" with several of Pray's former lieutenants "now dealing on their own as freelancers" and some having been incarcerated.

DEA Special Agent-in-Charge Ashton detailed the past and current status of The Family in testimony at the Commission's public hearing:

... Akbar's African-American organized crime network, called The Family, continues to operate. It is based in Essex County and consists of over two hundred members. Pray's organization started in the early 1970s as [an outgrowth of] the New World of Islam. The Muslim [name] Akbar means omnipotent, all powerful, or the great one. In fact, Akbar referred to himself as Akbar Akbar in some cases, or the greatest of the great. He lived up to this name by assuming control over a vast and durable criminal network. The New World of Islam initially focused on supporting bank robberies and even operated a bank robbery school. Pray's drug trafficking venture started out in a small area of Essex County and eventually extended to several states, including Ohio, Michigan, New York and Southern Florida.

At its height, Pray's network had at least 12 mid-level supervisors classified by the DEA as Class I violators. A Class I cocaine trafficker is defined by the DEA as one who has the capability of distributing at least fifty kilos of cocaine on a monthly basis and manages at least five subordinate drug traffickers.

... During Pray's 1989 federal trial for leading a continuing cocaine and marijuana trafficking enterprise, DEA witnesses testified that he was responsible for possessing and distributing approximately 188 kilograms of cocaine in a five-month period between February and June of 1987. In addition, he was responsible for distributing approximately 544 pounds of marijuana during the same period. It is estimated that Pray's organization was receiving millions of dollars of gross income annually.

... Pray's organization is presently operating at a much lower and more discreet level with basically the same structure. Reliable sources have indicated that Pray has maintained his customers and contacts and is still overseeing his drug transactions from prison.

Not long after Pray's arrest and conviction, The Family became scattered and ceased to exist.

== See also ==
- African American organized crime
- Akbar Pray
