= Midnight and the Meaning of Love =

2011 novel by Sister Souljah

- Author: Sister Souljah
- Language: English
- Genre: Literary fiction Urban fiction
- Publisher: Atria/Simon & Schuster
- Publication date: April 12, 2011
- Publication place: United States
- Media type: Print; E-book
- Pages: 624
- ISBN: 978-1-4391-6535-5 (hardcover); ISBN 978-1-4391-6536-2 (trade paperback); ISBN 978-1-4516-3742-7 (e-book)
- Preceded by: The Coldest Winter Ever (1999) and Midnight: A Gangster Love Story (2008)
- Followed by: A Deeper Love Inside: the Porsche Santiaga Story (2013)

Midnight and the Meaning of Love, originally known as Midnight 2: Word is Bond, is a novel by Sister Souljah that was published by Atria/Simon & Schuster on April 12, 2011. It was originally scheduled to be published on November 2, 2010, and it continues the story begun in Midnight: A Gangster Love Story.

Midnight travels to Japan in order to reunite with his wife Akemi Nakamura and bring her back to New York. She was taken away from him by her father, Naoko, a very successful businessman and minor celebrity in Japan, who does not approve of their union.

== Reception ==
Bobbi Booker of The Philadelphia Tribune wrote that Souljah "delivers a character that reflects the essence of her name as Midnight is a soldier who refuses to lose." Alesha Williams Boyd of the Daily Record called it a "bloated, dragging 600-page narrative" with "clunky" writing and "conspicuously missing" punctuation. However, she wrote that if "readers can get past its flaws they may find a main storyline and characters than entertain and enlighten enough to keep their interest".
