= Tracy Brown =

American author of urban fiction

Tracy Brown (1974-2023) was an American author of urban fiction known for her works set in Staten Island, New York.

== Personal life ==
Tracy Brown lived in Staten Island, New York, where she was born and grew up.

Brown became pregnant with her daughter when she was still a teenager. She nevertheless managed to graduate high school. She is also the mother of two sons. She was an alumna of John Jay College of Criminal Justice.

She ran a nonprofit organization known as We Are Ladies First, LTD which seeks to inform, inspire, and empower the young women of Staten Island. She also mentored and taught a course on writing to young ladies in a correctional environment of the New York State Foster Care System. She lent her talents to community plays, musicals, and church programs, writing and directing her first stage play Brand New in 2016.

== Death ==
Tracy Brown died on 20 May 2023; her death was announced by her children Ashley, Quaviel and Justin through a post on Tracy's official Facebook page.

== Books ==
Brown's books, which are set in Staten Island and focus on women who triumph despite adversity, have been Essence and USA Today bestsellers.

== Bibliography ==
- Black, Triple Crown Publications, 2003
- Dime Piece, Triple Crown Publications, 2004
- Criminal Minded, St. Martin's Griffin, 2005
- White Lines, St. Martin's Griffin, 2007
- Twisted, St. Martin's Griffin, 2008
- Snapped, St. Martin's Griffin, 2009
- Aftermath, St. Martin's Griffin, 2011
- White Lines II: Sunny, St. Martin's Griffin, 2012
- Flirting with Disaster, St. Martin's Griffin, 2013
- White Lines III: All Falls Down, St. Martin's Griffin, 2015
- Boss, St. Martin's Griffin, 2017
- Single Black Female, St. Martin's Griffin, 2021
- Hold You Down, St. Martin's Griffin, 2022
- Brooklyn, St. Martin's Griffin, 2024 (Posthumous)

Brown's stories have appeared in the anthologies The Game: Short Stories About the Life and Flirt. She was also a celebrity ghostwriter and biographer.
