= Toy Styles =

American novelist

Toy Styles (born 31 January), pen names T. Styles, Reign and Mikal Malone, is an American author, screenwriter and film producer of urban fiction.

According to Styles her first novels, Black & Ugly and A Hustler's Son, were written in a week. Black & Ugly reached number 3 on the Essence magazine bestseller list. She owns and operates Cartel Urban Cinema and the popular Urban Fiction publishing house, "The Cartel Publications".

Like many novelists within the urban fiction genre, Styles' experienced trials in the streets as a teenager, even doing a stint in jail before she turned her life around and became a bestselling author/publisher. Styles also refers to the literature she creates as Street Fiction, an alternative to the moniker Urban Fiction.

She was born in Washington, D.C. and resides in Baltimore.

Styles' screenplay 'Concrete Beach' reached the semifinalist round of the Academy Of Motion Picture Arts & Sciences', Nicholl Fellowship competition in 2018. In 2019 Styles became a quarterfinalist in Page International Screenwriting competition. In 2019, Styles reached the finals for the Academy of Motion Pictures Arts & Sciences Nicholl fellowship competition reaching the top twelve of over 7,300 entries.

== Bibliography ==
- "Rainbow Heart", iUniverse, 2005
- "Black & Ugly", Triple Crown Publications, 2007
- "A Hustlers Son", Triple Crown Publications, 2006
- "Cold As Ice" (anthology), Triple Crown Publications, 2007
- "The Face That Launched A Thousand Bullets", The Cartel Publications, 2009
- "Diamond Playgirls" (anthology), Kensington Books, 2010
- "Shyt List", The Cartel Publications, 2007
- "Shyt List 2", The Cartel Publications, 2009
- "Shyt List 3", The Cartel Publications, 2009
- "Shyt List 4", The Cartel Publications, 2010
- "Shyt List 5", The Cartel Publications, 2012
- "Pitbulls In A Skirt", The Cartel Publications, 2008
- "Pitbulls In A Skirt 2", The Cartel Publications, 2009
- "Pitbulls In A Skirt 3", The Cartel Publications, 2010
- "Pitbulls In A Skirt 4", The Cartel Publications, 2013
- "Black And ugly As Ever", The Cartel Publications, 2008
- "Redbone", Kensington Books, 2011
- "Redbone 2", Kensington Books, 2013
- "Raunchy", The Cartel Publications, 2010
- "Raunchy 2", The Cartel Publications, 2011
- "Raunchy 3", The Cartel Publications, 2012
- "Mad MAXXX: Children Of The Catacombs", The Cartel Publications, 2013
- "Luxury Tax", The Cartel Publications, 2013
- "Pretty Kings", The Cartel Publications, 2013
- "Pretty Kings 2", The Cartel Publications, 2013
- "Pretty Kings 3", The Cartel Publications, 2014
- "The End: How To Write A Book In 30 Days", The Cartel Publications, 2012
- "First Comes Love. Then Comes Murder", The Cartel Publications, 2013
- "Miss Wayne & The Queens Of D.C.", The Cartel Publications, 2010
- "Silence Of The Nine", The Cartel Publications, 2014
- "Silence Of The Nine 2", The Cartel Publications, 2014
- "Prison Throne", The Cartel Publications, 2014
- "Goon", The Cartel Publications, 2014
- "And They Call Me God", The Cartel Publications, 2015
- "The Ungrateful Bastards", The Cartel Publications, 2015
- "Lipstick Dom", The Cartel Publications, 2014
- "Kali: Raunchy Relived", The Cartel Publications, 2015
- "A Huslter's Son", The Cartel Publications, 2016
- "Nefarious", The Cartel Publications, 2016
- "Redbone 3", The Cartel Publications, 2016
- "Pretty Kings 4", The Cartel Publications, 2016
- "Cold as Ice", The Cartel Publications, 2017
- "The Whore the Wind Blew My Way", The Cartel Publications, 2017
- "War", The Cartel Publications, 2018
- "War 2", The Cartel Publications, 2018
- "War 3", The Cartel Publications, 2019
- "War 4", The Cartel Publications, 2019
- "War 5", The Cartel Publications, 2019
- "War 6", The Cartel Publications, 2020
- "War 7", The Cartel Publications, 2020
- "Truce", The Cartel Publications, 2020
- "Madjesty vs. Jayden", The Cartel Publications, 2020
- "Ask The Streets For Mercy", The Cartel Publications, 2020
- "Truce 2", The Cartel Publications, 2020
- "An Ace and Walid Very, Very Bad Christmas, The Cartel Publications, 2020
- "Truce 3", The Cartel Publications, 2021

== Filmography ==
- "Pitbulls In A Skirt", Cartel Urban Cinema, 2015
- "The Worst Of Us - S1", Cartel Urban Cinema, 2016
- "It'll Cost You", Cartel Urban Cinema, 2016
