= Midnight: A Gangster Love Story =

2008 novel by Sister Souljah

- Author: Sister Souljah
- Cover artist: John Vairo Jr. (designer); Mike Rich (photography)
- Language: English
- Genre: Literary fiction Urban fiction
- Publisher: Atria Books
- Publication date: November 4, 2008
- Publication place: United States
- English publication date: November 4, 2008
- Media type: Print; E-book
- Pages: 512 pp.
- ISBN: 978-1-4165-4518-7
- OCLC: 212846660
- Dewey Decimal: 813/.54 22
- LC Class: PS3569.O7374 M53 2008
- Preceded by: The Coldest Winter Ever (1999)
- Followed by: Midnight and the Meaning of Love (2011)

Midnight: A Gangster Love Story is a novel by Sister Souljah that was published in 2008 by Atria Books. It is a prequel of The Coldest Winter Ever (1999), the novel that spawned the contemporary street literature movement. It follows a young Black Sudanese Muslim immigrant in Brooklyn with whom Winter Santiaga associated before she was sent to prison.

== Publication history ==
The book was scheduled to be published in October 2008, but was actually first published on November 4, 2008 in hardback by Atria Books. The first paperback edition was published by Washington Square Press in September 2009.

== Plot ==
Midnight is born into a prominent Islamic Black Sudanese family in which he enjoys a life of comfort, confidence, and protection. His father provides him with a veil of privilege and deep, devoted love, but he never hides the truth about the fierce challenges of the world outside of his estate. In the mid 1980s, his father abandons the family, disappears, and is never heard from again. Just before his disappearance, he instructs Midnight and his immediate family to move to the United States. Midnight, his mother, and his sister eventually settle in project housing in the borough of Brooklyn in New York City. They are repulsed by American culture and try to live as comfortably as possible without fully engaging with their new home.

In the streets of Brooklyn, a young Midnight uses his Islamic mind-set and African intelligence to protect the ones he loves, build a business, reclaim his wealth and status, and remain true to his beliefs.

Over the course of four years, Midnight eschews traditional school and eventually enrolls into a Japanese martial-arts dojo, where he trains to be as nimble as a Japanese ninja. When a strange man professes his attraction to Umma, Midnight hunts him down and kills him in Prospect Park—a perfect murder that the police never solve. He also learns how to play basketball and is one of the star players in a hustlers’ league, where he meets his two closest friends, Ameer and Chris. He is also obsessed with protecting his family and procures a stash of weapons for protection. He frequents a small bookstore where he plays regular games of chess with its owner. However, he is extremely guarded and no one outside of his immediate family ever finds out whom he really is or even what his real name is (NB: his name is revealed in A Deeper Love Inside).

Later, Midnight meets a young woman named Akemi, who is an art prodigy from Japan who takes advanced-placement classes at Pratt Institute. Eventually, despite neither of them being able to understand each other’s language, Midnight and Akemi fall in love and decide to marry. Midnight tries to manage his life with Akemi and look out for his family and hang out with his friends while managing his family's newly opened business. He comes to terms with struggles that occur from day to day.

Umma and Naja accept Midnight and Akemi’s decision joyously. When Akemi’s father learns of the marriage, however, he does not approve of the union and takes her back to Japan. In the sequel, Midnight travels to Japan to try to take her back home.

== Characters ==
- Midnight, the narrator and title character, is a 14-year-old Black Sudanese immigrant. He learns about the struggles that occur in the US. He proceeds to criticize the way that modern African Americans act in contrast to the way he and the men in Sudan behave and, in contrast, they have loose behavior. He also learns to find love and trains in Ninjutsu so that he can protect the people whom he loves and cares for.
- Umma, Midnight's and Naja's mother, is content with the way women act in her country and is trying to make a notable life for her two children since their move to the United States by founding a business through which she designs and sells elaborate traditional garments.
- Naja, Umma’s daughter, is Midnight's 7-year-old sister. Midnight and Umma try to protect her from the world at large.
- Akemi, a 16-year-old Japanese girl who lives in Queens, where she is working for her uncle while in the US on an art fellowship from Japan. Akemi speaks Japanese, Mandarin, and Korean, but she is slowly learning English. An art prodigy, she attends college-level classes at Pratt Institute. She and Midnight love each other romantically.
- Ameer, described as one of Midnight’s close friends, is a 15-year-old Five Percenter who is mostly interested in girls. Ameer and Midnight fight frequently in a playful way. After a street fight between the two characters ends, Midnight explains his and Akemi's relationship.
- Chris, another of Midnight's close friends, plays basketball for money in a hustlers’ league, and lives with his mother and strict, protective father.
- Marty Bookbinder, the owner of a bookstore with whom Midnight plays chess and offers sage advice and life lessons.

== Reception ==
A reviewer for Publishers Weekly called the novel "gritty" before going to state that "a slack plot and slow pacing cause serious bloat, and Souljah's distinctive prose is woefully unpolished."
