= Urban fiction =

Literary genre

Urban fiction, also known as street lit or street fiction, is a literary genre set in a city landscape. The genre is defined by the socio-economic realities and culture of its characters as the urban setting. The tone for urban fiction is usually dark, focusing on the underside of city living. Profanity, human sexual activity, and violence are usually explicit, and most authors of this genre draw upon their past experiences to depict their storylines.

== Genesis and historical forces ==
Much of contemporary urban fiction is written by African Americans, due to the current demographics of inner cities. In his famous essay The Souls of Black Folk, W. E. B. Du Bois discussed how a veil separated the African American community from the outside world. By extension, fiction written by people outside the African American culture could not depict the people, settings, and events experienced by people in that culture. Those who grew up outside the urban culture may find it difficult to write fiction grounded in inner-city and African American life.

In a broader sense, urban fiction can be traced back to the 19th century as realist and modern authors began writing literature that reflected a changing urban society. City novels of yesteryear that depict the low-income survivalist realities of city living can also be considered urban fiction or street lit. In her book The Readers' Advisory Guide to Street Literature (2011), Vanessa Irvin Morris points out that titles considered canonical or "classic" today, could be considered the urban fiction or "street lit" of its day.

Some of the most notable examples of urban fiction from this time period include Sister Carrie by Theodore Dreiser, called the "greatest of all American urban novels," and Ulysses by James Joyce. Titles that depict historical inner-city realities include Stephen Crane's Maggie, A Girl of the Streets (1893), Charles Dickens's Oliver Twist (1838), and Paul Laurence Dunbar's The Sport of the Gods (1902). Urban fiction is not just an African American or Latino phenomenon; the genre exists along a historical continuum that includes stories from diverse cultural and ethnic experiences.

== Early 20th century urban fiction ==
Alongside the modernist movement that sought to challenge traditional modes of literary representation, a new wave of urban fiction emerged. According to Katherine Mullin, "the alienated modernist self is a product of the big city rather than the countryside or small town." According to Elizabeth Young in the essay anthology Shopping in Space, "the city offers unparalleled opportunities to the creative artist," ranging from "greed and deviancy, crime, bohemianism, sexual excess, nightlife and narcotics." Some of the most prevalent cities in 20th century urban fiction are New York City, especially the neighborhoods Greenwich Village, Times Square, and Harlem; Chicago; Los Angeles; and San Francisco.

The Beat Generation was a counterculture literary movement concentrated in New York City that contributed much to urban fiction. Author William S. Burroughs' novel Junky is a semi-autobiographical chronicle of heroin addiction on the fringes of society in New York, New Orleans, and Mexico City and a seminal text of New York urban fiction. The book is notable for its use of time period contextual slang, something characteristic of urban literature. Regarding the accounts of drug use, Will Self writes that Burroughs' "descriptions of the 'junk territories' his alter ego inhabits are, in fact, depictions of urban alienation itself. And just as in these areas junk is 'a ghost in daylight on a crowded street', so his junkie characters who are invariably described as 'invisible', 'dematerialized' and "boneless" - are, like the pseudonymous 'William Lee' himself, the sentient residue left behind when the soul has been cooked up and injected into space." Accounts of drug addiction and social alienation are also common in modern and contemporary urban fiction."

The Harlem Renaissance was an important precursor to contemporary African American urban fiction. Langston Hughes was an influential author of early urban literature and his "The Ballad of the Landlord" is regarded as an early text of urban poetry. The poem "grew out of conditions in New York City’s Harlem in the 1930’s. It graphically describes the escalation of anger and frustration that tenants experienced trying to get landlords to make basic repairs. It is structured like an old time blues song until the final verse where the rhythm changes." According to Sabrina Nixon, "instead of being swallowed by the depression of living in the ghetto, Hughes made it work for him."

== Emergence of contemporary urban fiction ==
As the demographics of urban cities shifted, so did that of urban fiction. Contemporary urban fiction was (and largely still is) a genre written by African Americans. In the research paper "Urban Underworlds: A geography of twentieth-century American literature and culture," Thomas Heise explores how urban settings in literature reflect "pathologized identities and lurid fears" and why American cities have been selectively targeted as "urban underworlds" in representations of urban fiction.

In the 1970s, during of the Black Power movement, a jailed Black man named Robert Beck took the pen name Iceberg Slim and wrote Pimp, a dark, gritty tale of life in the inner-city underworld. While the book contained elements of the Black Power agenda, it was most notable for its unsparing depiction of street life. Iceberg Slim wrote many other novels and attained an international following. Some of the terminology he used in his books crossed over into the lexicon of Black English.

== Hip hop ==
During the 1980s and early 1990s, urban fiction in print experienced a decline. By 2009, modern hip-hop literature was a thriving and popular genre. Many non-fiction publications from figures in the hip-hop realm such as Russell Simmons, Kevin Liles, LL Cool J, and FUBU founder Daymond John feature prominently. Karrine Steffans and shock jock Wendy Williams have written blockbuster books for this audience. Both Steffans and emcee 50 Cent have had such success with their books that they were given their own imprints to usher in similar authors, such as for 50 Cent's G-Unit Books.

== Contemporary street literature ==
=== 1990s ===
Toward the end of the 1990s, urban fiction experienced a revival, as demand for novels authentically conveying the urban experience increased, and new business models enabled fledgling writers to more easily bring a manuscript to market and to libraries. The first writer in this new cycle of urban fiction was Omar Tyree, who published the novel Flyy Girl in 1996, which was reissued as a reprint in 1999.

The genre gained significant momentum in 1999 with Sister Souljah's bestseller The Coldest Winter Ever. Teri Woods's True to the Game was also published in 1999, and became the standard from which the entrepreneurial publishing and distribution of contemporary urban fiction took note. The simultaneous publishing of these three novels created a momentum of readership for urban fiction and carried that wave for years. Thus The Coldest Winter Ever, True to the Game, and Flyy Girl are considered classics in the renaissance of the genre.

Sister Souljah describes the untapped market for urban fiction and the stereotypes that held it back in its early years:

The publishing industry did not realize that there was a huge market of Black readers. A lot of people in publishing fell into the same stereotypes that people in the mainstream fall victim to: that Black people either can't read or can't write, or don't read and don't write [...] When The Coldest Winter Ever came out... it took to task those stereotypes and showed that, yes, Black people love great stories like every other people from every other culture.

A notable example of urban fiction that entered the mainstream American consciousness, Push by Sapphire follows the story of a 16-year-old teen mother tackling incest, abuse, and poverty. It has since sold hundreds of thousands of copies, and thirteen years after its release it became an award-winning film called Precious. William Powers describes Sapphire's reaction to the book's success in an interview:

A few hours earlier, she says, she noticed "Push" for sale in one of the Penn Station bookstores, and at that moment it struck her she's no longer a creature of the tiny world of art magazines and homeless-shelter readings from which she came. "That was major mainstream," she says of the train-station sighting. "I'm so used to being underground, marginalized in a certain way."

=== 2000–present ===
In less than a decade, urban fiction has experienced a renaissance that boasts thousands of titles. The newest wave of street fiction is urban Latino fiction novels such as Devil's Mambo by Jerry Rodriguez, Chained by Deborah Cardona (a.k.a. Sexy) and Jeff Rivera's Forever My Lady.

Major writers of contemporary urban fiction include Wahida Clark, Kole Black, Vickie Stringer, Nikki Turner, K'wan Foye, Toy Styles, Roy Glenn, Kwame Teague, who many believed penned Teri Woods' Dutch, Treasure E. Blue and the writing duo Meesha Mink & De'Nesha Diamond.

There is also an unexpected literary wave of hip-hop fiction and street lit, which was sparked by Sister Souljah. Authors with a book or books in this offering include Saul Williams, Abiola Abrams, and Felicia Pride. These are hip hop lit or street lit books that take a more literary approach using metaphor, signifying, and other literary devices. These books may also be used in socially redeeming or classroom capacities, while maintaining love and positivity for the music and hip hop culture.

As street lit gained popularity, authors and publishers found new ways to promote their work and reach readers. In addition to direct sales, which helped build on the genre’s strong word-of-mouth culture, the Internet broadened opportunities for connecting with audiences beyond traditional advertising.

With the growth of internet-based publishing, many self-published authors are now household names, such as author Rasheed Clark. He was honored with fourteen Infini Literary Award nominations for his first two novels, Stories I Wouldn't Tell Nobody But God and Cold Summer Afternoon, both of which became bestsellers and allowed Clark become a leading African-American writer.

Authors in this genre such as K'wan Foye, Nikki Turner, and Toy Styles are known for bringing street teams and other musical promotion efforts to the book scene. In recent years, some of these authors have joined with hip hop artists such as 50 Cent to further promote the genre by penning the musicians' real-life stories.

In 2010, the hip hop music label Cash Money Records established a publishing branch, Cash Money Content. However, Cash Money Content's last book, Animal 3, was published in November 2014.

Vickie Stringer is an urban lit author, as well as founder and CEO of her own publishing company, Triple Crown Publications, a publisher of 45 novels and 35 writers as of 2008.

Forums like AALBC are often used to keep track of the progressive urban fiction genre as it grows tremendously daily.

=== Criticism ===
Early criticism of street lit was that books were badly edited due to lack of copy editing by independent publishers. However, in recent years the mainstream publishing industry recognized the genre's potential and signed many street lit authors to contracts, thus producing better-packaged product. One such author was Treasure E. Blue, according to Kirkus Reviews Magazine, a self-published sensation—his books reportedly sold 65,000 copies before he was signed to a major six-figure deal with Random House Publishing.

The reach of urban fiction into a large youth readership is undeniable today. Researchers have turned their attention to its influence on urban literacy, particularly among adolescent girls. Despite misgivings about editing quality issues, secondary school teachers in suburban settings have included urban literature in curricula, referring to it as "multicultural young adult literature" to expose students to "authentic" voices representing urban life.

== Notable authors of contemporary urban fiction ==
- Red Jordan Arobateau
- Tracy Brown
- JaQuavis Coleman
- Ashley Antoinette
- Nina Foxx
- K'wan Foye
- Cachet
- Travis Hunter
- Styles P
- Eric Pete
- Sapphire
- Sister Souljah
- Vickie Stringer
- Toy Styles
- Kole Black
- Nikki Turner
- Teri Woods
- Donald Goines
- Treasure E. Blue
- Quan Millz

== Research articles ==
- Morris, V. I. (2011). The Street Lit Author and the Inner-City Teen. Journal of Young Adult Library Service 10(1), 21–24.
- Morris, V.I. (2010). Street Lit: Before you recommend it, you have to understand it. In Urban Teens in the Library: Research and Practice. (pp. 53–66). Chicago: American Library Association.
- Brooks, W. & Savage, L. (2009). Critiques and Controversies of Street Literature: A Formidable Genre. The ALAN Review, 37(3), 48–55.
- Hill, M.L., Perez, B., & Irby, D. (2008). Street fiction: What is it and what does it mean for English teachers ? English Journal, 97(3), 76–81.
- Morris, V. I., Hughes-Hassell, S., Agosto, D. E., & Cottman, D. T. (2006). Street Lit: Flying off teen fiction bookshelves in Philadelphia public libraries. Young Adult Library Services, 5(1), 16–23.
- Triplett, L. (2018) Urban Fiction Novels: Az We Ride We Die Series. (1) Grant Street, (2) The Search Continues, (3) Friends to the End. FREE Read online on Amazon.

== Books ==
- Morris, Vanessa Irvin (2011). The Readers' Advisory Guide to Street Literature. American Library Association. ISBN 0838911102.
- Honig, Megan (2010). Urban Grit: A Guide to Street Lit. Libraries Unlimited. ISBN 159158857X.
- Ratner, Andrew. (2009). Street Lit: Teaching and Reading Fiction in Urban Schools. McGraw-Hill. ISBN 0073378437.
