= No Disrespect =

1994 book by Sister Souljah

- First edition (Times Books)
- Author: Sister Souljah
- Language: English
- Genre: Memoir
- Published: December 27, 1994
- Publisher: Times/Crown/Random House
- Publication place: United States
- Pages: 384
- ISBN: 978-0-8129-2483-1

No Disrespect is a 1994 American memoir written by Sister Souljah.
