= K'wan Foye =

American novelist

K'wan
- Born: K'Wan Foye; New York City, U.S.
- Occupations: Author; publisher
- Writing career
- Period: 2002–present
- Genres: urban fiction; young adult fiction; crime fiction

K'wan Foye, also known simply as K'wan, is an American author of urban fiction.

According to Foye, his first novel, Gangsta, is largely autobiographical. The book reached number three on the Essence magazine bestseller list.

K'wan has been featured in Vibe, Pages, King, The Library Journal, Entertainment Weekly, The New York Press, and Time Magazine.

K'wan was also the recipient of the 2012 and 13 Street Lit Book Award Medals (SLBAM) in adult fiction for Eviction Notice and Animal.

His credits also include featured commentary in the documentary Iceberg Slim: Portrait of a Pimp (produced by Ice-T) and a reoccurring guest role on TV-One's Celebrity Crime Files.

K'wan lives in New Jersey where he is working on his next novel.

== Bibliography ==
- Gangsta, Triple Crown Publications, 2002
- Road Dawgz, Triple Crown Publications, 2003
- Street Dreams, St. Martin's Press, 2004
- Hoodlum, St. Martin's Press, 2005
- Eve, St. Martin's Press, 2006
- Hood Rat, St. Martin's Press, 2006
- Still Hood, St. Martin's Press, 2007
- Gutter, St. Martin's Press, 2008
- Section 8, St. Martin's Press, 2009
- From Harlem with Love, Write 2 Eat Concepts, 2010
- The Leak, St. Martin's Press, 2010
- Welfare Wifeys, St. Martin's Press, 2010
- Eviction Notice, St. Martin's Press, 2011
- Gangland, Write 2 Eat Concepts, 2011
- Love & Gunplay, Write 2 Eat Concepts, 2012
- Animal, Cash Money Content, 2012
- Wild Cherry, St. Martin's Press, 2012
- Animal 2, Cash Money Content, 2013
- Animal 3: Revelations, Cash Money Content, 2014
- Animal IV: Last Rites, Write 2 Eat Concepts, 2015
- Diamonds and Pearls, St. Martin's Griffin, 2016
- Animal 4.5, Write 2 Eat Concepts, 2017
- The Diamond Empire St. Martin's, 2017
- Hoodlum 2: The Good Son, Write 2 Eat Concepts, 2017
