= 360 Degrees of Power =

Studio album by Sister Souljah
- Released: 1992
- Recorded: 1991
- Studios: Greene St. (New York, NY)
- Genres: Political hip hop; spoken word
- Length: 46:29
- Label: Epic/SME
- Producers: Street Element; the LG Experience

Singles from 360 Degrees of Power
- 1. "The Final Solution: Slavery’s Back in Effect" Released: October 24, 1991; 2. "The Hate That Hate Produced" Released: February 11, 1992

360 Degrees of Power is the only full-length studio album by American rapper, author, and activist Sister Souljah, released in 1992 by Epic Records. The recording sessions took place at Greene St. Recording in New York. The album was produced by Street Element and the LG Experience. It features guest appearances from Chuck D, Ice Cube, and Ras Baraka. It reached number 72 on the Top R&B/Hip-Hop Albums chart and sold only 27,000 copies in the United States. It produced two singles: "The Final Solution: Slavery’s Back in Effect" and "The Hate That Hate Produced". Music videos for the songs were banned by MTV.

The album was met with criticism, not only for its performances—most of which were angry spoken-word tirades that Souljah screamed rather than traditional hip-hop rhymes—but also because of its controversial lyrics.

== Critical reception ==
Professional ratings
Review scores
Source	Rating
AllMusic	1.5/5 stars
The Encyclopedia of Popular Music	3/5 stars
RapReviews	6/10

Dennis Hunt of the Los Angeles Times called the album "a stark, disturbing primer on black power", writing that Sister Souljah "uses crude street language and scathing humor to convey her controversial ideas". The Deseret News wrote that "the record fails by being too dogmatic to be entertaining, too hateful to be inspiring, too shallow in its musical and lyrical reach to be catchy." Trouser Press wrote that "Souljah’s militant Afrocentricity contains such positive elements as self-reliance, self-defense, entrepreneurship, unity and education, but proceeds into paranoia ... syllogism ... and absurd sexism".

== Track listing ==
No.	Title	Writer(s)	Producer(s)	Length
1.	"African Scaredy Katz in a One-Exit Maze"	Lisa Williamson; Eric Sadler	Street Element
2.	"360 Degrees of Power"	Williamson; Robert Taylor	Street Element
3.	"The Hate That Hate Produced"	Williamson; Sadler; Shinn	Street Element
4.	"State of Accommodation: Why Aren't You Angry?" (featuring Chuck D)	Williamson; Carlton Ridenhour	The LG Experience
5.	"Nigga's Gotta"	Williamson; Sadler	Street Element
6.	"Wild Buck Beer" (featuring MC Just Want to Get Paid)	MC Just Want to Get Paid Act Like I'm Down with the Black Movement; Sadler	Street Element
7.	"The Final Solution: Slavery's Back in Effect"	Williamson; Michael Shinn	The LG Experience
8.	"Killing Me Softly: Deadly Code of Silence" (featuring Ice Cube)	Williamson; O'Shea Jackson; Sadler	Street Element
9.	"Umbilical Cord to the Future" (featuring Ras Baraka)	Williamson; Taylor	Street Element
10.	"The Tom Selloutkin Show"	Sadler	Street Element
11.	"Brainteasers and Doubtbusters"	Williamson; Sadler	Street Element
12.	"My God Is a Powerful God"	Williamson; Taylor	Street Element
13.	"Survival Handbook vs. Global Extinction"	Williamson; Sadler; Taylor	Street Element
Total length:				46:29

== Personnel ==
- Al "Purple" Hayes – backing vocals, guitar, bass
- Djinji Brown – backing vocals, engineering assistant
- Robert "The Epitome of Scratch" Taylor – backing vocals
- Chris Champion – backing vocals
- Derrick Brooks – backing vocals
- Erin Jenkins – backing vocals
- Jimi Fox – backing vocals
- Kedding Etienne – backing vocals
- Kimberly Davis – backing vocals
- Liz Psaros – backing vocals
- Ras Baraka – backing vocals
- Charles Dos Santos – engineering
- Chris Shaw – engineering
- Dan Wood – engineering
- Jamie Staub – engineering
- Tamara Wilson – engineering assistant
- Carlton Batts – mastering
- Dave Harrington – technical studio master
- Steve Loeb – technical studio master
- Todd Gray – photography

== Charts ==
Chart (1992)	Peak position
US Top R&B/Hip-Hop Albums (Billboard)	72
