= Wahida Clark =

African-American author

- Born: Trenton, New Jersey, U.S.
- Occupations: Novelist, Motivational Speaker
- Writing career
- Genre: Urban fiction
- Notable works: Thugs and The Women Who Love Them, Payback With Ya Life, The Golden Hustla

Wahida Clark is an African-American author known for her popular Thug series novels. She began her writing career while serving time in prison, and her novels have been listed on the New York Times and Essence best-sellers lists.

== Background and writing career ==
Clark took a creative writing course while serving a 10-year prison sentence for money laundering, wire fraud, and mail fraud. She wrote her first novel by hand on a yellow legal pad, a practice that she has continued to this day. While Clark's early novels were written and published while Clark was in prison, upon her release she launched a publishing company, Wahida Clark Presents Publishing Company LLC. She has gone on to publish a total of 11 novels, and has described her genre as Thug Love fiction, a subgenre of urban fiction. She is also a co-author of Jamila T. Davis's upcoming book series "The Pink Panther Clique".

In addition to her writing career, Clark is a motivational speaker. She speaks at juvenile facilities, junior high schools, halfway houses, and prisons, encouraging her audiences to dream big, develop skills, and to not "waste time."

== Works ==
- Thugs and The Women Who Love Them (2002)
- Every Thug Needs a Lady (2003)
- Payback is a Mutha (2006)
- Thug Matrimony (2007)
- Sleeping With the Enemy (2008)
- Payback With Ya Life (2008)
- Thug Lovin' (2009)
- Golden Hustla (2010)
- Justify My Thug (2011)
- Payback Ain't Enough (2012)
- Honor Thy Thug (2013)
- Blood, Sweat & Payback (2014)
- Thugs 7 (2019)

== Awards ==
- United Distribution Publisher of the Year (2014)
