= Vickie Stringer =

American novelist

Vickie Stringer is an American novelist from Detroit, Michigan.

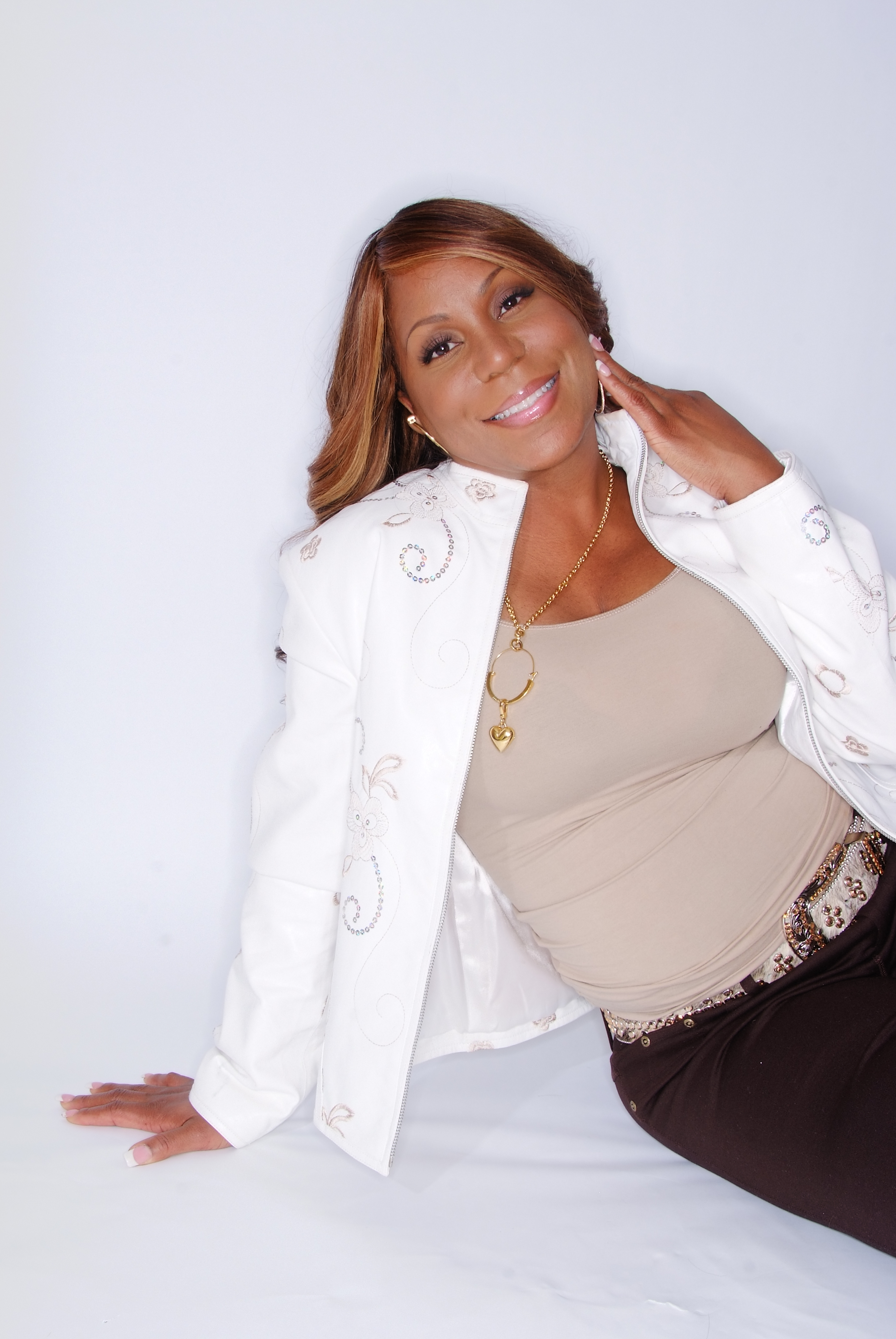
Vickie M. Stringer, Author, Entrepreneur

== Early life ==
Stringer grew up in Detroit, Michigan. Her mother was a schoolteacher and her father was an electrical engineer for General Motors. She graduated from the prestigious Cass Technical High School in 1985. She briefly attended Western Michigan University in Kalamazoo and was in the process of transferring to Ohio State University when she became romantically involved with a drug dealer. The two had a son in 1992, after which Stringer and the boy's father separated. In order to support herself and her son, Stringer then turned to dealing drugs herself, and also worked as a manager of an escort service.

In September 1994, Stringer was arrested on federal drug trafficking and money-laundering charges after selling two- kilograms of cocaine to a police informant in Columbus, Ohio. She pleaded guilty to drug trafficking and money laundering and received a seven-year sentence in a federal prison.

== Writing career ==
While in prison, Stringer wrote her first novel Let That Be The Reason. She was released from prison in January 2001, and began working as a bartender. Stringer attempted to interest publishers and agents in her manuscript and was rejected twenty-six times. She borrowed money from her family and had a printer make a small number of copies of her book, which she then marketed and sold on her own. Sales were so good that Stringer soon had enough capital to found Triple Crown Publications - named after her drug crew - to publish her works and those of other writers, principally in the urban fiction genre, aimed at a demographic largely ignored by major publishers. Publishers Weekly Magazine named her, "The Reigning Queen" of Urban fiction and Book Magazine name one of the "Most 50 influential Women" in publishing. Additionally, her novel has been translated in Japanese for worldwide distribution and acclaim.

Stringer's second novel, Imagine This, was purchased by Simon & Schuster imprint Atria Books as part of a six-figure two-book publishing deal. As with her debut (Let That Be The Reason) novel, Imagine This spent more than a two years on the Essence paperback bestseller list. Simon & Schuster Atria offered Stringer additional publishing deals which resulted in more best-sellers as her well-received "Red Series": Dirty Red, Still Dirty, Dirtier Than Ever, Low Down & Dirty and Dirty Love.

== Entrepreneur ==
Until the company re-branded in 2022, Stringer was the publisher of Triple Crown Publications, one of the most successful African American book publishers in the U.S. and abroad. She has been featured in such prominent news media as The New York Times, Newsweek, MTV News, Publishers Weekly, Vibe, Millionaire Blueprints, Writer's Digest, Black Expressions, Essence and many more.

In its 20th year in business, Triple Crown Publications has broken barriers and launched the carriers of the biggest literary names in the urban fiction genre. As a literary agent, she is responsible for brokering over US$3,000,000 in book deals for her clients.

== Awards ==
Stringer has won Ball State University Entrepreneur of the Year (2007) by the Miller College of Business.

== Research and studies ==
Stringer has participated in the John Jay College of Criminal Justice: Facilitating Re-entry Venturing Beyond the Gates to study the theory of using entrepreneurship to reduce recidivism. Stringer's success story was used as an example of this possibility. California psychologist, Dr. Sonnee Weedn, wanted to know what it was about these women that allowed them to overcome the hindrances of racism, both overt and internalized, as well as sexism, which can undermine the success of any woman and interviewed Stringer.
