= Travis Hunter (writer) =

American novelist

- Born: Florence, South Carolina, U.S.
- Occupation: Novelist
- Writing career
- Years active: 2000–present
- Genre: Urban fiction
- Website: www.travishunter.com

Travis Hunter is an American author of urban fiction. He initially self-published his first novel, The Hearts of Men, in 2000 through his own company, Jimrose Publishing House. After shopping that book during the 2000 Book Expo America in Chicago, Hunter received an offer from Random House, Inc. The Hearts of Men was re-released through their Strivers Row/Villard division in May 2001. Since then, Hunter has had eight more novels published. His most recent novel Married but Not Really (2018), was again self-published by his Jimrose Publishing House.

Born in Florence, South Carolina, Hunter was raised in Philadelphia, Pennsylvania, and attended Clark Atlanta University and Georgia State University. He is a U.S. Army veteran.

== Works ==
- The Hearts of Men (May 2001, initially self-published as Jimrose Publishing, later by Random House)
- Married But Still Looking (June 2003, Random House)
- Troubled Man (August 2003, Villard/Random House)
- A One Woman Man (June 2004, One World/Ballantine Books/Random House)
- Something to Die For (October 2006, One World/Ballantine Books/Random House)
- A Family Sin (September 2007, One World/Ballantine Books/Random House)
- Dark Child: A Novel Presented by Zane (June 2009, Strebor Publishing)
- Momma's a Virgin (September 2011, Strebor Publishing)
- Married but Not Really (2018, Jimrose Publishing)
