= Sister Souljah moment =

Political discourse term

A Sister Souljah moment is a politician's calculated public repudiation of an extremist person, statement, group, or position that is perceived to have some association with the politician's own party.

It has been described as "a key moment when the candidate takes what at least appears to be a bold stand against certain extremes within their party" and as "a calculated denunciation of an extremist position or special interest group." This act is intended to be a signal to centrist voters that the politician is not beholden to those positions or interest groups. However, such a repudiation runs the risk of alienating some of the politician's allies and the party's base voters. The term is named after the hip hop artist Sister Souljah.

== Origins ==
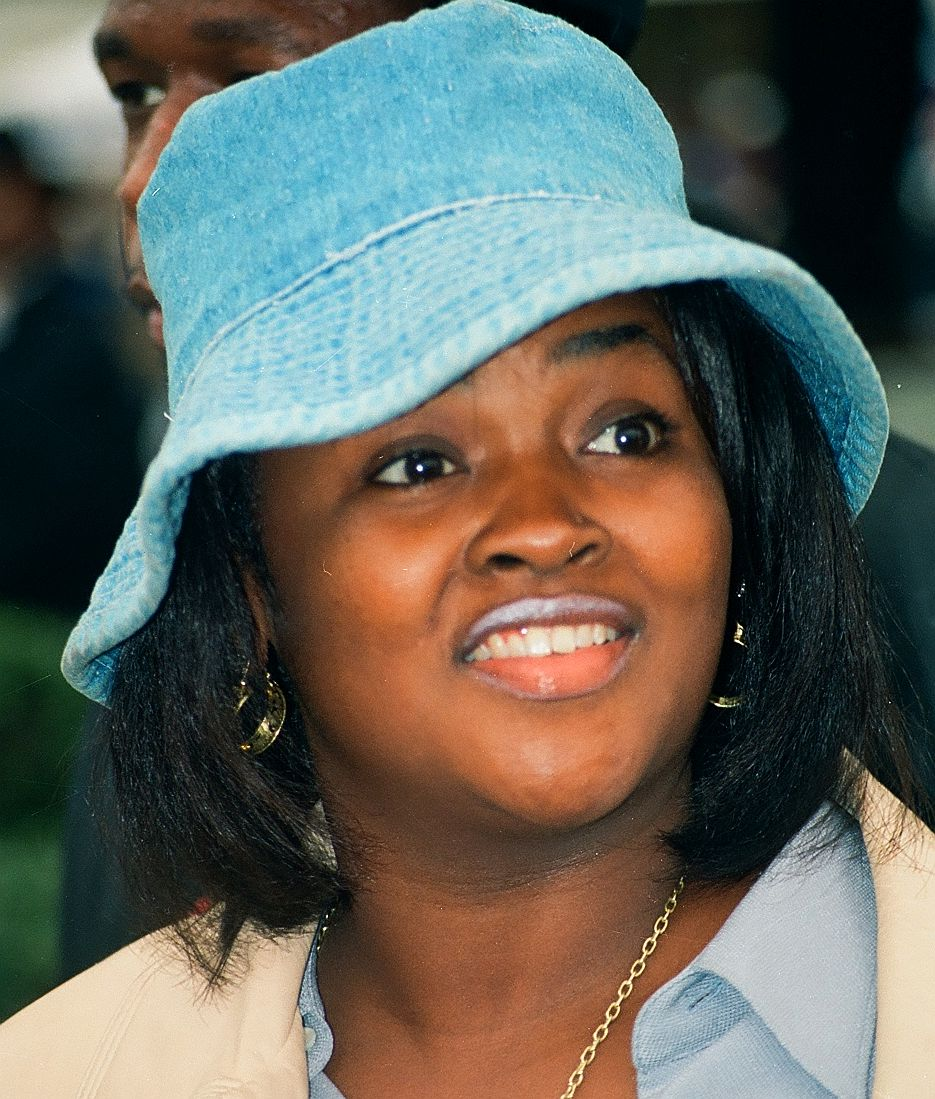
Sister Souljah in 1997

The term originated during Bill Clinton's 1992 presidential campaign. In a Washington Post interview published on May 13, 1992, the hip hop MC, author, and political activist Sister Souljah was quoted as saying (in response to the question regarding black-on-white violence in the 1992 Los Angeles riots):

Question: Even the people themselves who were perpetrating that violence, did they think that was wise? Was that a wise reasoned action?
Souljah: Yeah, it was wise. I mean, if black people kill black people every day, why not have a week and kill white people?... White people, this government and that mayor were well aware of the fact that black people were dying every day in Los Angeles under gang violence. So if you're a gang member and you would normally be killing somebody, why not kill a white person? Do you think that somebody thinks that white people are better, are above and beyond dying, when they would kill their own kind?

— Quoted in David Mills (June 16, 1992) "In Her Own Disputed Words; Transcript of Interview That Spawned Souljah's Story", The Washington Post

Speaking to Jesse Jackson Sr.'s Rainbow Coalition in June 1992, Clinton responded both to that quotation and to a line in the video for her song "The Final Solution: Slavery's Back in Effect" ("If there are any good white people, I haven't met them"), saying: "If you took the words 'white' and 'black,' and you reversed them, you might think David Duke was giving that speech."

Before his appearance, Clinton's campaign staff had an intense debate about how far he should go in distancing himself from Jackson, who was unpopular with moderate voters. When Souljah was invited to speak at the conference, Clinton's advisors saw their chance. In an essay for The New York Review of Books, Joan Didion, who covered Clinton's campaign, wrote, "a number of reporters had apparently been told in advance by Clinton aides that Governor Clinton would use his Rainbow speech to demonstrate his 'independence' from Jesse Jackson, and the very quotable intemperance of Sister Souljah provided the most logical possible focus for such a demonstration." Didion argued that the media had seen the Sister Souljah incident favorably, as "a Clinton call for 'an end to division' that had at once served to distance him from Jackson and to demonstrate that he was 'the guy in charge,' capable of dominating, or 'standing up to,' a kind of black anger that many white voters prefer to see as the basis for this country's racial division."

External videos
- Sister Souljah's response to Gov. Bill Clinton's remarks, June 16, 1992, C-SPAN

Jackson criticized Clinton's response harshly, saying, "Sister Souljah represents the feelings and hopes of a whole generation of people", and claimed she had been misquoted. Clinton was also criticized by some of the Democratic Party's other African American supporters. Souljah responded by denying she had ever made remarks promoting murder and called Clinton a racist and a hypocrite because he had played golf at a country club that refused to admit black members until he decided to run for president earlier in the year. Clinton acknowledged that he had been a member of an all-white Arkansas golf club early into his presidential campaign and publicly apologized. In response to the rebuttal, Paul Greenberg, an Arkansas journalist and longtime Clinton critic who dubbed him "Slick Willie" during his 1980 reelection bid, criticized Souljah for lying about what she said in an earlier interview with the Washington Post, accusing her of trying to fend off criticism "with the savvy of an experienced pol". In the same article, he compared her to Louis Farrakhan, the leader of the Nation of Islam.

== Other examples ==
Well into the 21st century, there have been several instances called Sister Souljah moment(s).

=== Early 2000s ===
As a candidate for the Republican nomination for president in 2000, Texas Governor George W. Bush spoke before the conservative Manhattan Institute in October 1999 saying, "Too often, on social issues, my party has painted an image of America slouching toward Gomorrah", quoting the title of a book by conservative jurist Robert Bork. Bush's comments were seen as a repudiation of the religious right and an attempt to appeal to moderate voters; commentator Charles Krauthammer called it "an ever so subtle Sister Souljah on Robert Bork."

In the same campaign for the Republican nomination, Arizona Senator John McCain stated, "Neither party should be defined by pandering to the outer reaches of American politics and the agents of intolerance, whether they be Louis Farrakhan or Al Sharpton on the left or Pat Robertson or Jerry Falwell on the right." This was similarly seen as a repudiation of the religious right; columnist Jacob Weisberg called it "a pungent Sister Souljah moment."

During the 2008 United States presidential campaign, Democratic Party nominee Barack Obama received much criticism for his association with his longtime pastor, Jeremiah Wright, and Wright's pattern of controversial statements. On April 29, Senator Obama distanced himself, in a well-received speech on racism, calling some of Wright's statements "outrageous" and "a bunch of rants that aren't grounded in truth." South Carolina Congressman James Clyburn said of the speech, "This, I think, offers Barack Obama his Sister Souljah moment"; the speech was also described as "more than a Sister Souljah moment" by columnist Maureen Dowd.

Later in the campaign, Obama delivered a speech on Father's Day at the annual convention of the National Association for the Advancement of Colored People (NAACP). In the speech, he appeared to criticize absentee fathers in the African-American community, saying, "if we are honest with ourselves, we’ll admit that what too many fathers also are is missing — missing from too many lives and too many homes. They have abandoned their responsibilities, acting like boys instead of men. And the foundations of our families are weaker because of it. You and I know how true this is in the African-American community." Multiple publications called the speech a Sister Souljah moment, although Obama spokeswoman Linda Douglass denied this.

On July 10, 2008, prior to a taping of the news program Fox & Friends, Jesse Jackson was unwittingly caught by an open microphone whispering to a fellow interviewee, saying, in reaction to Obama's Father's Day speech the month before, that Obama was "talking down to black people" and that he (Jackson) wanted "to cut [Obama's] nuts off." Jackson's son, Illinois Congressman and co-chair of Obama's presidential campaign Jesse Jackson Jr. publicly lambasted his father's comments. Washington Post journalist Dan Balz called the comments an "accidental Sister Souljah moment" for Obama, since Jackson had distanced himself from the candidate without Obama having to take a stand.

=== 2020s ===
On August 28, 2020, conservative pundits George Will and Amanda Carpenter called on Democratic presidential nominee Joe Biden to have a "Sister Souljah moment" to distance himself from the violence of the Kenosha protests, which occurred against the backdrop of the police shooting of Jacob Blake, an African American man. Two days prior, Biden had already released a statement condemning violence at protests, which the commentators viewed as inadequate.

In 2026, then Democratic senatorial nominee Abdul El-Sayed faced calls to disavow streamer Hasan Piker by some commentators who believed a "Sister Souljah moment" with Piker was necessary for El-Sayed to win the general election. Piker had previously campaigned with El-Sayed during the Democratic primary in Michigan, which El-Sayed won by roughly 0.9 percentage points (about 13,800 votes) over Rep. Haley Stevens, a moderate candidate. Commentators including Thomas B. Edsall, Stephen A. Smith, and Ruy Texeira have also advocated for a distancing of the Democratic Party from the Democratic Socialists of America (DSA), with which Piker is loosely affiliated, for similar reasons. In August 2026, El-Sayed issued a statement saying he had no plans to campaign with Piker again, though he did not formally disavow him.

That same year, many called on JD Vance to disavow his self-described friend Tucker Carlson, who many believe is a political extremist and an antisemite. Vance has declined multiple times to disavow Carlson. Some have described this as providing potential for a Sister Souljah moment, saying Vance's continued association with Carlson could harm his political future.
