= Niobia Bryant =

African-American novelist

Niobia Simone Bryant
- Born: November 24; Newark, New Jersey, U.S.
- Education: Seton Hall University
- Occupation: Author
- Writing career
- Pen name: Niobia Bryant, Meesha Mink, Simone Bryant
- Period: 2000–present
- Genres: Romance; Fiction; Urban Fiction; Crime Fiction; YA Fiction
- Website: niobiabryant.com

Niobia Bryant (born November 24 in Newark, New Jersey) is an African-American novelist of both romance and mainstream fiction. She also wrote urban fiction and crime fiction as Meesha Mink and young adult fiction as Simone Bryant.

== Biography ==
Niobia Bryant was born and raised in the Central Ward of Newark, New Jersey to Letha and Ernest. She has one brother, Caleb. Bryant was raised in a single-parent home and credits her mother for introducing her to books at an early age.

Bryant was educated in the Newark Public Schools system and graduated from University High School, eventually earning a Bachelor of Science in Nursing and a Bachelor of Arts in Social and Behavioral Science with an accompanying Psychology minor from Seton Hall University in South Orange, New Jersey.

Bryant finished her first book, an African-American romance she entitled Down Home Girl in 1999 and submitted it to several publishers. After offers from two publishing houses, she accepted the deal with BET Book/Arabesque. The title was changed to Admission of Love and her debut was released August 2000 to rave reviews. Her second book from BET Books, Three Times a Lady (2001), became her first national bestseller. In 2003 Three Times a Lady was selected by the Books for the Blind (Talking Books) program to be transcribed into an audio recording supplied free of charge to people who are blind or visually impaired. Her romances, "Make You Mine" and "Red Hot" won for the 2009 and 2013 Romantic Times Best African-American Romance Awards, respectively.

In 2007, her first mainstream Live and Learn was published by Kensington Publishing. In her mainstream books the subject matter steered away from the happily ever after of romance and took on more complex and darker themes like adultery, drug addiction, and domestic violence. Since Live and Learn Bryant has written several mainstream novels that have showcased her diverse writing ability, including her bestselling Mistress series (Message from a Mistress, Mistress No More, Mistress, INC., The Pleasure Trap, and the upcoming Mistress for Hire). The Pleasure Trap was nominated for a 2014 RT Award for Best Multicultural Fiction. In 2017 Message from a Mistress was made into a TV movie broadcast on Centric.

In 2008, Bryant teamed up with a fellow romance author to write the urban fiction Hoodwives series for Simon & Schuster/Touchstone. Writing as Meesha Mink and De'Nesha Diamond, their first collaboration, Desperate Hoodwives, was released in January 2008, followed by Shameless Hoodwives in August 2008, and the highly anticipated The Hood Life in January 2009. The books have been featured in many national publications and have received critical praise for the writers' skill at storytelling and character development. The New York Post listed Desperate Hoodwives as Required Reading and Essence magazine listed Shameless Hoodwives as one of their "Top Ten Summer Sizzlers" in 2008. In 2011 she released her first solo project as Meesha Mink for Simon & Schuster/Touchstone, the "Real Wifeys" trilogy (Real Wifeys: On the Grind, Real Wifeys: Get Money, and Real Wifeys: Hustle Hard). Mink's Kiss the Ring, the first book in the author's on-going urban fiction/ mystery "Queen" series centered on a modern-day Foxy Brown-like character, received rave reviews from Ebony Magazine, The Library Journal, and Publishers Weekly. The second book, All Hail the Queen, was released February 2015. After a six-year hiatus, the third book, Street Queens, was released independently.

The Meesha Mink website credits the author with saying:

The stories about inner cities need to be as diverse as the people who live in these environments. Growing up on 16th Ave in Newark all my life, I knew in a one-block radius you could either have: a single mother or a married couple raising their family; dope dealers or people working forty hours a week; a homeowner or someone renting a low income apartment. For me, urban fiction isn't about glorifying the negatives in the 'hood, but simply telling the real stories that do exist. As a writer and a reader, I can always respect the gift of storytelling of ALL stories.

Since her 2000 debut, Bryant's books have consistently received top reviews; hit bestseller lists; been released as audiobook, book club and large print editions; and garnered award nominations/wins. Two of her books, "Real Wifeys: On The Grind" and "Mistress No More", simultaneously made the list of Black Expressions’ Best Books of 2011. Her books have appeared in many national publications including Ebony Magazine, Essence Magazine, The New York Post, Star Ledger, The Huffington Post, USA Today, Dallas Morning News, Upscale, Smooth Magazine, Juicy Magazine, The Library Journal, Publishers Weekly, Black Hair Magazine UK, and Parle Magazine.

Currently Bryant writes full-time and lives in South Carolina.

== Bibliography ==
=== Writing as Niobia Bryant (Contemporary Romance) ===
- Admission of Love (2000) BET Books/ Arabesque (Reissued as eBook and paperback with new cover)
- Three Times a Lady (2001) BET Books/ Arabesque Reissued as eBook with new cover)
- Heavenly Match (2004) BET Books/ Arabesque (Reissued as eBook with new cover)
- Can't Get Next to You (2005) BET Books/Arabesque (Reissued as eBook with new cover)
- Let's Do it Again (2005) Harlequin/Arabesque (Reissued as eBook with new cover)
- Heated (2006) Kensington/Dafina Romance
- Could It Be? (2006) Harlequin/Arabesque (Novella in the anthology You Never Know)
- Count on This (2006) Harlequin/Arabesque (Reissued as eBook with new cover)
- Hot Like Fire (2007) Kensington/Dafina Romance
- More and More (2009) (Novella in a charity anthology)
- Make You Mine (2009) Kensington/ Dafina Romance (Reissued with new cover in 2024)
- Give Me Fever (2010) Kensington/Dafina Romance
- The Hot Spot (8/2011) Kensington/Dafina Romance
- One Hot Summer (7/2011) Kensington/Dafina (Novella in the anthology Heat Wave)
- Red Hot (9/2012) Kensington/Dafina Romance
- Strong Heat (12/2013) Kensington/Dafina Romance
- Want, Need, Love (Ballinger Sisters #1) (12/2014) Kensington/Dafina Romance (Reissued as eBook with new cover)
- Just Say Yes: A Strong Family Novella (10/2016) Infinite Ink Presents...
- Love Without Limits (7/2017) Infinite Ink Presents...
- A Billionaire Affair (4/2018) Harlequin/Kimani Romance
- Welcome Back, My Love: A Strong Family Novella (6/2018) Infinite Ink Presents...
- Tempting the Billionaire (10/2018) Harlequin/Kimani Romance
- The Billionaire's Baby by Niobia Bryant & The Wrong Fiancé by Lindsay Evans (5/2019) Harlequin/Kimani Romance
- Strong Loving: A Strong Family Novella (8/2019) Infinite Ink Presents...
- Christmas with the Billionaire by Niobia Bryant & A Tiara for Christmas by Carolyn Hector (11/2019) Harlequin/Kimani Romance
- One Night with Cinderella (Cress Brothers #1) (2/2021) Harlequin/Desire
- The Rebel Heir (Cress Brothers #2) (5/2021) Harlequin/Desire
- Hot and Strong: A Strong Family Novella (12/2021) Infinite Ink Presents...
- An Offer from Mr. Wrong (Cress Brothers #3) (7/2022) Harlequin/Desire
- The Pregnancy Proposal (Cress Brothers #4) (10/2022) Harlequin/Desire
- Making Love (Ballinger Sisters #2) (8/2023) Infinite Ink Presents...
- The Marriage Deadline (Cress Brothers #5) (9/2023) Harlequin/Desire
- Under the Same Roof (Texas Cattleman's Club: Diamonds and Dating Apps #5) (12/2023) Harlequin/Desire
- Breaking Their One Rule (Cress Brothers #6) (4/2024) Infinite Ink Presents...
- Good Love (Ballinger Sisters #3) (8/2024) Infinite Ink Presents...
- Going Strong: A Strong Family Novella (11/2024) Infinite Ink Presents...
- Slow Hand (The Lawmen #1) (TBA) Infinite Ink
- Easy Touch (The Lawmen #2) (TBD) Infinite Ink
- Spend Some Time (The Lawmen #3) (TBD) Infinite Ink

=== Writing as Niobia Bryant (Women's Fiction) ===
- Live and Learn (2007) Kensington/ Dafina (Reissued as Mass Market)
- Show and Tell (2008) Kensington/ Dafina (Reissued as Mass Market)
- Message From a Mistress (2010) Kensington/ Dafina (Reissued as Mass Market)
- Mistress No More (6/2011) Kensington/Dafina (Reissued as Mass Market)
- Reckless (5/2012) Kensington/Dafina (Anthology)(Reissued as Mass Market)
- Mistress, Inc. (6/2012) Kensington/Dafina (Reissued as Mass Market)
- Never Keeping Secrets (6/2013) Kensington/Dafina (Reissued as Mass Market)
- The Pleasure Trap (11/2014) Kensington/Dafina (Reissued as Mass Market)
- Mistress for Hire (10/2018) Kensington/Dafina
- Madam, May I... (6/2019) Kensington/Dafina
- Her Pleasure (4/2021) Kensington/Dafina
- Madam X (4/2023) Kensington/Dafina

=== Writing as Niobia Simone (Erotica) ===
- Caramel Flava edited by Zane (2006) Simone & Schuster/Atria (Anthology Collaboration)

=== Writing as Meesha Mink (Urban/Crime Fiction/Mystery) ===
- Desperate Hoodwives (1/2008) Simon & Schuster/Touchstone (Reissued as Mass Market 10/2013)
- Shameless Hoodwives (8/2008) Simon & Schuster/Touchstone
- The Hood Life (1/2009) Simon & Schuster/Touchstone
- Real Wifeys: On The Grind (1/2011) Simon & Schuster/Touchstone (solo debut)
- Real Wifeys: Get Money (1/2012) Simon & Schuster/Touchstone (solo)
- Real Wifeys: Hustle Hard (1/2013) Simon & Schuster/Touchstone (solo)
- Kiss The Ring (8/2014) Simon & Schuster/Touchstone (solo)
- All Hail the Queen (2/2015) Simon & Schuster/Touchstone (solo)
- Street Queen (11/2021) Infinite Ink Presents... (solo)

=== Writing as Simone Bryant (Young Adult Fiction) ===
- FABULOUS: A Pace Academy novel (2/2010) Harlequin/Kimani Tru
- FAMOUS: A Pace Academy novel (1/2011) Harlequin/Kimani Tru

== Film Adaptation ==
- Message from a Mistress (2016)

== Awards and accolades ==
- Featured, Barnes & Noble's "B&N Press Presents" list for June/July 2018 (Welcome Back, My Love: A Strong Family Novella)
- Featured, Barnes & Noble's "Nook Press Presents" list for October/November 2016 (Just Say Yes: A Strong Family Novella)
- Nominee, 2016 Romance Slam Jam's Emma Award/ Steamy Romance of the Year (Want, Need, Love)
- Nominee, 2015 African American Literary Awards/ Best Urban Fiction (All Hail the Queen)
- Nominee, 2014 RT Award/Best Multicultural Fiction (The Pleasure Trap)
- Awarded, Library Journal's Best Books 2014/African-American Fiction (Kiss the Ring)
- Awarded, Library Journal's Top Pick of the Month/August 2014 (Kiss the Ring)
- Awarded, Library Journal's Top Pick of the Month/May 2013 (Never Keeping Secrets)
- Winner, 2012 RT Awards/ Best Multicultural Romance (Red Hot)
- Awarded, RT's Top Pick of the Month/2012 (Red Hot)
- Charted, Black Expressions' Best Books/2011 (Real Wifeys: On The Grind and Mistress No More)
- Nominee, 2010 Romance Slam Jam's Emma Award/ Best Steamy Romance (Make You Mine)
- Winner, 2009 RT Award/ Best African-American Romance (Make You Mine)
- Winner, 2006 eHarlequin's Reader's Choice/Favorite Steamy Novel (Count on This)
- Winner, 2006 Romance in Color Award/ Best Anthology (You Never Know)
- Nominee, 2006 African-American Literary Awards/ Best Romance (Heated)
- Nominee, 2005 RT Award/ Best African-American Romance (Can't Get Next to You)
- Awarded, RT's Top Pick of the Month/2005 (Let's Do it Again)
- Awarded, RT's Top Pick of the Month/2005 (Can't Get Next to You)
- Awarded, RT's Top Pick of the Month/2004 (Heavenly Match)
- Awarded, Romantic Times (RT) Top Pick of the Month/2002 (Three Times a Lady)
- Winner, 2000 Romance in Color Award/Best New Author (Admission of Love)
- Winner, 2000 Shades of Romance Award/Best African-American Romance
