= Quan Millz =

American author

- Born: Colby Durden
- Writing career
- Notable works: Old THOT Next Door (2020); This Hoe Got Roaches In Her Crib (2021) "Pastors Eat Pwussy Too" (2022)

TikTok information
- Page: Quan Millz Books
- Followers: 1.2 million

Colby Durden, known by his pen name Quan Millz, is an American author. He gained viral online attention due to the titles and cover art for his books This Hoe Got Roaches In Her Crib: An Urban Satire (2021) and Old THOT Next Door (2020). As of September 22, 2026, he had over 1.2 million followers and 37.3 million likes on TikTok. He has over 70 published works, some ghostwritten under a different alias. His works are described as intentionally provocative and humorous.
