= Akemi Sugiyama =

Japanese volleyball player (born 1965)

Personal information
- Born: 1 March 1965 (age 61) Hiratsuka, Kanagawa, Japan
- Height: 1.75 m (5 ft 9 in)

Volleyball information
- Position: Middle blocker
- Number: 5

National team
- Years: Team
- 1988–1991: Japan

Akemi Sugiyama (Japanese: 杉山 明美; born 1 March 1965) is a Japanese former volleyball player who competed in the 1988 Summer Olympics in Seoul.

Sugiyama toured in the United States with the Japan's University All-Stars volleyball team in 1984, and led the team at the 1985 World University Games. In 1988, Sugiyama finished fourth with the Japanese team in the Olympic tournament.
