= The Coldest Winter Ever =

1999 novel by Sister Souljah

- Author: Sister Souljah
- Cover artist: Michael Legrou
- Language: English
- Genre: Literary fiction Urban fiction
- Publisher: Simon & Schuster (hardcover); Pocket Books (mass-market paperback); Washington Square Press (trade paperback)
- Publication date: April 1999
- Publication place: United States
- Media type: Print
- Pages: 337 pp. (hardcover); 544 pp. (mass–market paperback); 368 pp. (trade paperback)
- ISBN: 0-671-02578-3 (hardcover); ISBN 1-4165-2169-0 (mass-market paperback); ISBN 0-7432-7010-X (trade paperback)
- OCLC: 40682955
- Followed by: Midnight: A Gangster Love Story (2008)

The Coldest Winter Ever is a 1999 novel by Sister Souljah published by Simon and Schuster. The novel has a prequel and a sequel.

== Plot summary ==
The story is set in Brooklyn, New York. The main character is Winter Santiaga, the teenaged daughter of Ricky Santiaga, a local drug kingpin. Winter is brash and self-important; she says, "it was important for me to know I deserved the best, no slum jewelry or knock-offs". The story is told from her perspective in slang that is highly influenced by the hip-hop culture. Due to the power of her father, Winter is infamous in her neighborhood, and she uses her power to get what she wants. This all changes when Winter's father is arrested for drug trafficking, and Winter finds herself in a girls' home. Winter takes up the skills she learned from her father to maintain her lifestyle, such as selling illicit items in the girls' home to make money.

== Characters ==
Winter Santiaga: The protagonist of the story. She is born to a teen mother and drug lord father during extreme winter weather. The story follows her life, first as a pampered child and adolescent of questionable morality. She is highly focused on attainment of material wealth and is also sexually promiscuous. After her father is arrested, Winter encounters much more strife, and eventually lands up repeating many of the mistakes and experiences of her parents.

Simone: Winter's nemesis. She is initially a coconspirator of Winter's as they are involved in illegal activities together. She is eventually arrested while pregnant and is angry when Winter turns her back on her. As such, she seeks revenge, resulting in an escalating rivalry that becomes violent.

Sister Souljah: A fictional portrayal of the author herself, who advocates for the improvement of black communities. In the novel, she provides a home for a displaced Winter. She is an advocate and role model for young black men and women.

Ricky Santiaga: Winter's father and he is depicted as a man who lavishes attention, love, and material gifts on the women in his life, while being a calculated and violent drug lord. He is depicted as an initially successful man who lets greed and his vices overpower him.

Lana Santiaga: Winter's mother who is more sister than mother. She is a teen mother who seems to be content with her lot in life as long as she is provided material compensation for her sexual favors. She is not very maternal towards her family.

Rashida: Winter's Housemate at House of Success. She is responsible for facilitating the relationship between Winter and Sister Souljah.

Bullet: Winter's wealthy ex-boyfriend. He is depicted as being ultimately selfish and focused on his own best interests.

Porsche Santiaga: Younger sister of Winter who takes after her.

Mercedes and Lexus Santiaga: Younger twin sisters of Winter and Porsche.

Lauren: Sister Souljah's sister.

Natalie: Winter's friend.

Midnight: Young yet strategic worker for Ricky Santiaga. Smart, loyal, and mysterious. Winter's crush.

== Reception ==
The Coldest Winter Ever was one of the best-selling novels of 1999, and since its debut, it has continued to enjoy success in sales year after year. As a result of this book, Sister Souljah cemented her role as a successful novelist. While the reviews of the book have been overwhelmingly positive, fans say the classification of the book as street lit/urban lit has diminished its status. Sister Souljah believes the splitting of fiction as such is a result of the exclusionary hierarchy of literature that sidelines authors of color. Sister Souljah told The Root in an interview, "I'm not in sync with this street-lit genre. I think that when European authors or Euro-American authors write about urban, suburban or rural areas, it's just called literature. So I call my work literature, and anyone who reads my books knows that it's literature."

A 1999 review in Publishers Weekly commended and criticized Sister Souljah's writing style, calling it both "raw and true" and "rough and unsophisticated" in the same sentence. The reviewer called the book "honest...at the expense of disciplined writing." Kirkus Reviews lauds the language, calling it a "frank" "tour de force", but criticizes Winter for her narcissism and materialism.

== Themes ==
The novel deals with drugs, sex, prostitution, violence, greed, and the cycle of poverty.

Sex is used throughout the novel as a means of currency, power, control, and expression of love. Lana's rapid descent into drug use and prostitution, eventually resulting in her death, provides the most extreme example. She has no marketable skills, and used her beauty as a means to provide for herself. She makes herself beautiful enough to be attractive to the wealthiest man. Ricky Santiaga, the father of Winter, was a powerful street pharmacist, but due to the nature of their society, his skill was not put towards a legal profession and he was removed from the community. (Ricky Santiaga was not only a drug trafficker, he was a violent criminal as well, a tendency which continues after his incarceration.) After his incarceration, his wife has no safety net, and she does not have the means to continue making herself attractive. Her beauty regimen requires matching outfits, expensive makeup, regular hair care, and other expensive items. Without her husband, she reduces herself to prostituting herself for drugs and quickly becomes ill.

All the characters show greed, a condition the fictional Sister Souljah believes is ubiquitous in her community and would like to remedy. The greed extends not just to money, but to power and sex as well. For example, Winter discovers that her father has a mistress who bore him a son. He was greedy for more children, for a son, for more women. His girlfriend wanted his money and access to his power. Winter wants money, power, beauty. Perhaps the only reason that she wants money and beauty is the access they afford her to power over others. Midnight is perhaps the only character who seems immune to greed and lust, as he "has plans" for living well legally.

== Related books ==
=== Spin-off series ===
- Midnight: A Gangster Love Story
- Midnight and the Meaning of Love
- A Moment of Silence: Midnight III

=== Sequels ===
- A Deeper Love Inside: The Porsche Santiaga Story
- Life After Death
- Love After Midnight

== Movie rights ==
According to the May 2008 issue of Vibe Magazine, Jada Pinkett Smith was developing a film based on the book and was going to serve as its executive producer. In 2011, she told the magazine that she hadn't found a good business package yet, but she was still interested in creating a film.
