= Sister Souljah =

American author, activist, and rapper (born 1964)

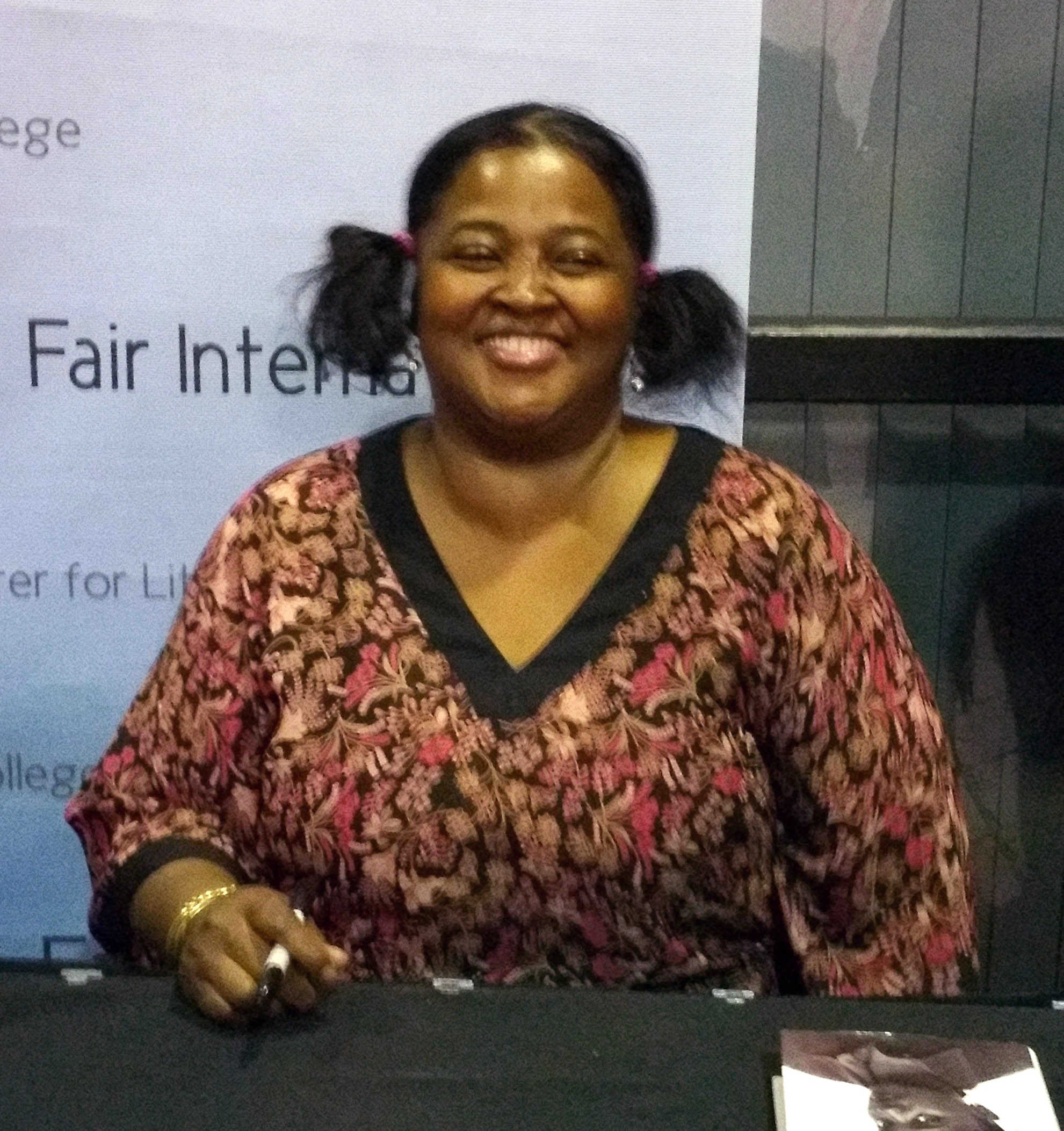
- Sister Souljah at the Miami Book Fair International on November 21, 2015
- Born: Lisa Williamson; 1964 (age 61–62); The Bronx, New York City, U.S.
- Education: Rutgers University (BA); University of Salamanca
- Occupation: Author
- Years active: 1985–present
- Known for: Sister Souljah moment; No Disrespect; The Coldest Winter Ever; Midnight: A Gangster Love Story
- Spouse: Mike Rich
- Children: 1
- Website: sistersouljah.com

Lisa Williamson (born 1964), known as Sister Souljah, is an American author, activist, rapper, and film producer.

She gained significant attention in 1992, when Bill Clinton, running as the presumptive Democratic Party nominee for president of the United States, criticized her remarks about race in the United States. The incident was the basis for the phrase "Sister Souljah moment", referring generally to a politician's calculated public repudiation of an extreme person, statement, group, or position associated with the politician's own party.

== Early life and education ==
Sister Souljah was born in the Bronx, New York City, in 1964. She recounts in her memoir No Disrespect that she was born into poverty and raised on welfare for some years. At the age of 10, she moved with her family to the suburb of Englewood, New Jersey, a suburb with a strong African-American presence. Englewood is also home to other famous Black artists such as George Benson, Eddie Murphy, and Regina Belle. There she attended Dwight Morrow High School.

Souljah disliked what American students were being taught in school systems across the country. She felt that the school systems intentionally left out the African origins of civilization. In addition, she criticized the absence of a comprehensive curriculum of African-American history, which she felt that all students, Black and white, needed to learn and understand in order to be properly educated. She felt that she was being taught very little of her history, since the junior high school and high school left out black history, art, and culture. She commented: "I supplemented my education in the white American school system by reading African history, which was intentionally left out of the curriculum of American students." From 1978 to 1981 she attended Dwight Morrow High School, which had a relatively even distribution of black, Latino, and Jewish student enrollment and a majority-black administration during the time of her studies. She was a legislative intern in the House of Representatives. Souljah was also the recipient of several honors during her teenage years. She won the American Legion's Constitutional Oratory Contest, for which she received a scholarship to attend Cornell University's Advanced Summer Program.

In her college years she traveled widely, visiting Britain, France, Spain, Portugal, Finland, and Russia. Her education was reinforced with first-hand experiences as she worked in a medical center in Mtepa Tepa, a village located in Zimbabwe, and assisted refugee children from Mozambique. She also traveled to South Africa and Zambia. She graduated from Rutgers University with a dual major in American History and African Studies. She became a well-known and outspoken voice on campus and wrote for the school newspaper. One of her noted campus initiatives was spearheading a campaign to bring Jesse Jackson to Rutgers to speak against the university's controversial investments in apartheid South Africa at the time, when disinvestment from South Africa was a heated political issue. Sister Souljah was part of the Rutgers Coalition for Divestment, which successfully prompted the Rutgers University administration to divest US$3.6 million in its financial holding companies doing business in that country. Sister Souljah and students across the state of New Jersey also organized a successful campaign to get the state of New Jersey to divest more than US$1 billion of its financial holdings in apartheid-era South Africa.

In 1985, during her senior year at Rutgers University, she was offered a job by Reverend Benjamin Chavis of the United Church of Christ Commission for Racial Justice. She spent the next three years developing, organizing, and financing programs such as African Survival Camp, a six-week summer sleepaway camp in Enfield, North Carolina. She also became the organizer of the National African Youth-Student Alliance and outspoken voice against racially motivated violence in cases such as the racist murder at Howard Beach, the racially motivated murder of Yusuf Hawkins, and more.

== Career ==
=== Recording artist ===
Souljah appeared on several tracks as a featured guest with the hip-hop group Public Enemy, and she became a full member of the group when Professor Griff was forced to leave after making anti-Semitic remarks. In 1992, she released her only album, 360 Degrees of Power.

=== Statement about riots ===
During an interview on the 1992 Los Angeles riots conducted May 13, 1992, she was quoted in The Washington Post as saying, "If black people kill black people every day, why not have a week and kill white people?"

External videos
- Sister Souljah's response to Gov. Bill Clinton's remarks, June 16, 1992, C-SPAN

The quotation was later reproduced in the media, and she was widely criticized. Presidential candidate Bill Clinton publicly criticized her statement, and Jesse Jackson, for allowing her to be on his Rainbow Coalition. The incident resulted in the phrase "Sister Souljah moment" being coined to describe a politician's public repudiation of extremist views that are perceived to have some association with the politician's own faction or party.

=== Author ===
In 1994, Sister Souljah published a memoir titled No Disrespect.

In 1999, she made her debut as a novelist with The Coldest Winter Ever, which has been described as a cult classic. The novel has been interpreted as employing an author-surrogate technique, with Souljah inserting a fictionalized version of herself in the novel. Souljah said that she was the pioneer for starting "a renaissance, or what Chuck D of Public Enemy would call a revolution, of reading." As of March 2016, Souljah was on the New York Times Bestseller List three times. The Coldest Winter Ever was widely acclaimed for making the second wave of the genre known as street literature more popular. About this, Souljah said:

I'm a college graduate, and if I read something like Romeo and Juliet, I'm reading about a gang fight, I'm reading about young love, young sex, longing. I'm reading the same themes that I'm writing in my books. So if somebody comes along and says, "Yours is street literature"—what was Shakespeare's?"

A sequel of the novel, Life After Death, was published in March 2021.

Midnight: A Gangster Love Story was published on November 4, 2008. It tells the backstory of Midnight, a character first introduced in The Coldest Winter Ever. It entered The New York Times bestseller list at No. 7 its first week of publication. The sequel to Midnight, Midnight and the Meaning of Love., was released on April 12, 2011. A third Midnight novel, A Moment of Silence, was published on November 10, 2015. As of March 2016, it had sold over 2 million copies. This novel follows the main character, Midnight, as he attempts to reclaim his innocence and his identity while in prison.

Another spinoff, A Deeper Love Inside: The Porsche Santiaga Story, was published January 29, 2013.

All of Souljah's novels deal with universal themes of faith, love, and integrity. Most of her novels have become popular among the prison population, with her books being available in many prison libraries. Due to this, she has worked in tandem with Black and Nobel, a Web site that ships books, magazines, and DVDs to prisons nationwide. Her work has also been referenced multiple times in popular culture, including on the Netflix series Orange Is the New Black.

She also contributes occasional pieces for Essence Magazine, and has written for The New Yorker.

=== Community activist ===
As a community activist, Souljah organized a number of service programs. In 1985, during her senior year at Rutgers University, she developed and financed the African Youth Survival Camp for children of homeless families, a six-week summer sleep-away camp in Enfield, North Carolina. This program ran for more than three years. She has been a motivating force behind a number of hip-hop artists' efforts to give back to the community, organizing major youth events, programs and summer camps with musicians such as Lauryn Hill, Doug E. Fresh, and Sean "Diddy" Combs.

Souljah was heavily involved with rallies against racial discrimination, police brutality and the lack of proper education for urban and underrepresented youths. She went on to hold several concerts and protests in New York City, which were supported by many prominent rappers.

Souljah was the executive director of Daddy's House Social Programs Inc. for seven years. It is a non-profit corporation for urban youth, financed by Sean "Diddy" Combs and Bad Boy Entertainment. Daddy's House educates and prepares people ages ten to sixteen to be in control of their academic, cultural and financial lives. The students progressing through the program earn support to travel throughout the world.

== Personal life ==
Sister Souljah is married to Mike Rich. They have a son.

== Discography ==
Album information
360 Degrees of Power
- Released: March 17, 1992
- Chart positions: No. 72 Top R&B/Hip Hop
- Last RIAA Certification: none
- Singles: "The Hate that Hate Produced," "The Final Solution: Slavery's Back in Effect"

== Bibliography ==
- No Disrespect (1994)
- The Coldest Winter Ever (1999)
- Midnight: A Gangster Love Story (2008)
- Midnight and the Meaning of Love (2011)
- A Deeper Love Inside: the Porsche Santiaga Story (2013)
- A Moment of Silence: Midnight III (2015)
- Life After Death (2021)
- Love After Midnight (2024)
- A Beautiful Evil (2027)
