= Omar Tyree =

African-American novelist

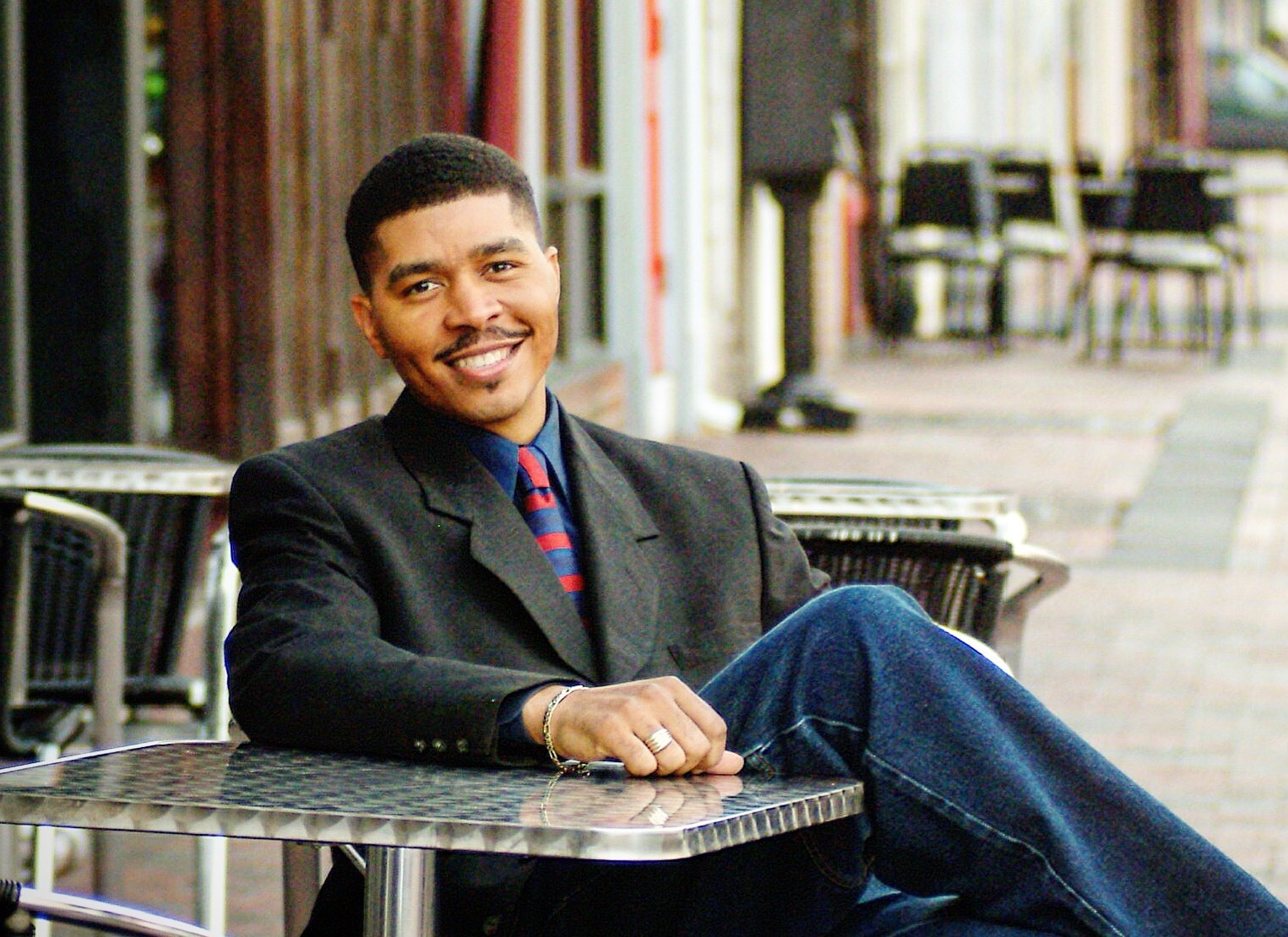
Image of Omar Rashad Tyree

Omar Rashad Tyree (born April 15, 1969) is an African-American novelist. He is known for his best-selling book For the Love of Money and Mayor for Life: The Incredible Story of Marion Barry Jr., which he co-authored with Marion Barry.

== Early life and education ==
Tyree, also known as Briggs, was born in 1969 in Philadelphia, Pennsylvania, United States. He graduated from Central High School in 1987; after which he enrolled at the University of Pittsburgh, where he studied to become a pharmacist before transferring to Howard University in 1989.

His journey as an entrepreneur began in his early twenties, when he started a book publishing company, Mar Productions, to release his earliest works of fiction. Recently, Tyree released his first movie, The Lure of Young Women.

In 1991, Tyree received a degree in print journalism from Howard University.

== Career ==
Shortly, after his graduation, he started to work as a reporter and an assistant editor at The Capitol Spotlight. Later, he worked as a chief reporter for News Dimensions.

In 2003, Tyree released a hip-hop album titled Rising Up!

Tyree's first non-fiction book, The Equation: Applying the 4 Indisputable Components of Business Success, was published in January 2009.

== Awards and recognition ==
- 2001: NAACP Image Award for Outstanding Literature
- 2006: Phillis Wheatley Literary Award for Body of Work in Fiction.

== Bibliography ==
As Omar Tyree:

- Capital City (1993)
- Battlezone (1994)
- Flyy Girl (1997–11)
- A Do Right Man (1998–10)
- Single Mom (1999–10)
- Sweet St. Louis (2000–08)
- For the Love of Money (2001–08)
- Just Say No (2002–07)
- Leslie (2003–08)
- Diary of a Groupie (2004–06)
- Dark Thirst (2004–10)
- Boss Lady (2005–06)
- What They Want (2006–07)
- The Last Street Novel (2007–07)
- Pecking Order (2008)

Control (2024) Under the pen name the Urban Griot:

- College Boy (2003)
- Cold Blooded (2004)
