= Nikki Turner (author) =

American author

- Born: Richmond, Virginia, U.S.
- Education: North Carolina Central University
- Occupations: Writer, novelist
- Writing career
- Genre: Urban fiction
- Website: web.archive.org/web/20130622121954/http://nikkiturner.com[archived]

Nikki Turner is an American author of urban fiction, dubbed by Trendsetter Magazine as the "Queen of Hip Hop Lit". Her first two books, A Hustler's Wife and A Project Chick have sold about 150,000 copies as of 2005.

Turner was born in Richmond, Virginia and has received a degree from North Carolina Central University. She formerly worked as a travel agent, eventually quitting to become a full-time novelist. Turner has stated that she began writing urban fiction as a way of showing the "dark side" of the street life beyond the "glitz and the glamor".

== Bibliography ==
- A Project Chick (2003)
- The Glamorous Life: A Novel (2005)
- Riding Dirty on I-95: A Novel (2006)
- Death Before Dishonor (2007)
- Black Widow: A Novel (2008)
- Street Chronicles Girls in the Game (2008)
- Christmas in the Hood (2008)
- Ghetto Superstar: A Novel (2009)
- Relapse: A Novel (2010)
- Natural Born Hustler (2010)
- A Woman's Work (2011)
- A Project Chick II (2013)
- The Glamorous Life 2 (2013)
- The Banks Sisters (2015)
- Carl Weber's Kingpins: MIam (2015)

=== Girls from Da Hood ===
- Girls from Da Hood (2006)
- Tales from da Hood (2006)
- Girls From Da Hood 2 (2008)
- Girls from da Hood 4 (2010)

=== Hustler's Wife series ===
1. A Hustler's Wife (2002)
2. Forever a Hustler's Wife: A Novel (2008)
3. Heartbreak of a Hustler's Wife: A Novel (2011)

=== Unique ===
Note: This series was released as an e-serial from 2012 to 2014

1. Unique (2014)
2. Unique II: Betrayal (2012)
3. Unique III: Revenge (2012)
4. Unique IV: Love & Lies (2013)
5. Unique V: Secrets Revealed (2014)

- Always Unique (2014, collects stories I - V)
