= List of winners and nominated authors of the Booker Prize =

The following is a list of winners and shortlisted authors of the Booker Prize for Fiction. The prize has been awarded each year since 1969 to the best original full-length novel, written in the English language, by a citizen of the Commonwealth of Nations or the Republic of Ireland. In 2014, it was opened for the first time to any work published in the United Kingdom and written in (not translated into) the English language.

There have been three special awards celebrating the Booker's history. In 1993, the "Booker of Bookers" prize was awarded to Salman Rushdie for Midnight's Children (the 1981 winner) as the best novel to win the award in its first 25 years. Midnight's Children also won a public vote in 2008, on the prize's fortieth anniversary, for "The Best of the Booker". In 2018 a special "Golden Booker" was awarded celebrating 50 years of the award; this was won by Michael Ondaatje for The English Patient.

== Winners, shortlists and longlists ==
Year	Award	Author	Title	Publisher	Judges
1969	Winner	P. H. Newby	Something to Answer For	Faber & Faber	W. L. Webb (chair); David Farrer; Frank Kermode; Stephen Spender; Dame Rebecca West
1969	Shortlist	Barry England	Figures in a Landscape	Jonathan Cape	W. L. Webb (chair); David Farrer; Frank Kermode; Stephen Spender; Dame Rebecca West
1969	Shortlist	Nicholas Mosley	Impossible Object	Hodder & Stoughton	W. L. Webb (chair); David Farrer; Frank Kermode; Stephen Spender; Dame Rebecca West
1969	Shortlist	Iris Murdoch	The Nice and the Good	Chatto & Windus	W. L. Webb (chair); David Farrer; Frank Kermode; Stephen Spender; Dame Rebecca West
1969	Shortlist	Muriel Spark	The Public Image	Macmillan	W. L. Webb (chair); David Farrer; Frank Kermode; Stephen Spender; Dame Rebecca West
1969	Shortlist	Gordon Williams	From Scenes like These	Secker & Warburg	W. L. Webb (chair); David Farrer; Frank Kermode; Stephen Spender; Dame Rebecca West
1970	Winner	Bernice Rubens	The Elected Member	Eyre & Spottiswoode	David Holloway (chair); Antonia Fraser; Ross Higgins; Richard Hoggart; Dame Rebecca West
1970	Shortlist	A. L. Barker	John Brown's Body	Hogarth	David Holloway (chair); Antonia Fraser; Ross Higgins; Richard Hoggart; Dame Rebecca West
1970	Shortlist	Elizabeth Bowen	Eva Trout	Jonathan Cape	David Holloway (chair); Antonia Fraser; Ross Higgins; Richard Hoggart; Dame Rebecca West
1970	Shortlist	Iris Murdoch	Bruno's Dream	Chatto & Windus	David Holloway (chair); Antonia Fraser; Ross Higgins; Richard Hoggart; Dame Rebecca West
1970	Shortlist	William Trevor	Mrs. Eckdorf in O'Neill's Hotel	Bodley Head	David Holloway (chair); Antonia Fraser; Ross Higgins; Richard Hoggart; Dame Rebecca West
1970	Shortlist	Terence Wheeler	The Conjunction	Angus & Robertson	David Holloway (chair); Antonia Fraser; Ross Higgins; Richard Hoggart; Dame Rebecca West
1970 (Note: Awarded in 2010 as the Lost Man Booker Prize (Note: "... in 1971, just two years after it began, the Booker Prize ceased to be awarded retrospectively and became – as it is today – a prize for the best novel of the year of publication. At the same time the award moved from April to November and, as a result, a wealth of fiction published for much of 1970 fell through the net and was never considered for the prize." See "Lost Man Booker Prize shortlist announced". bookerprize.com. Archived from the original on 2 December 2010.))	Winner	J. G. Farrell	Troubles	Weidenfeld & Nicolson	Rachel Cooke; Katie Derham; Tobias Hill
1970	Shortlist	Nina Bawden	The Birds on the Trees	Virago	Rachel Cooke; Katie Derham; Tobias Hill
1970	Shortlist	Shirley Hazzard	The Bay of Noon	Macmillan	Rachel Cooke; Katie Derham; Tobias Hill
1970	Shortlist	Mary Renault	Fire from Heaven	Longman	Rachel Cooke; Katie Derham; Tobias Hill
1970	Shortlist	Muriel Spark	The Driver's Seat	Macmillan	Rachel Cooke; Katie Derham; Tobias Hill
1970	Shortlist	Patrick White	The Vivisector	Jonathan Cape	Rachel Cooke; Katie Derham; Tobias Hill
1970	Longlist	Brian Aldiss	The Hand-Reared Boy	Weidenfeld & Nicolson	Rachel Cooke; Katie Derham; Tobias Hill
1970	Longlist	H. E. Bates	A Little of What You Fancy?	Michael Joseph	Rachel Cooke; Katie Derham; Tobias Hill
1970	Longlist	Melvyn Bragg	A Place in England	Secker & Warburg	Rachel Cooke; Katie Derham; Tobias Hill
1970	Longlist	Christy Brown	Down All the Days	Secker & Warburg	Rachel Cooke; Katie Derham; Tobias Hill
1970	Longlist	Len Deighton	Bomber	Jonathan Cape	Rachel Cooke; Katie Derham; Tobias Hill
1970	Longlist	Elaine Feinstein	The Circle	Hutchinson	Rachel Cooke; Katie Derham; Tobias Hill
1970	Longlist	Reginald Hill	A Clubbable Woman	HarperCollins	Rachel Cooke; Katie Derham; Tobias Hill
1970	Longlist	Susan Hill	I'm the King of the Castle	Hamish Hamilton	Rachel Cooke; Katie Derham; Tobias Hill
1970	Longlist	Francis King	A Domestic Animal	Longman	Rachel Cooke; Katie Derham; Tobias Hill
1970	Longlist	Margaret Laurence	The Fire-Dwellers	Macmillan	Rachel Cooke; Katie Derham; Tobias Hill
1970	Longlist	David Lodge	Out of the Shelter	Macmillan	Rachel Cooke; Katie Derham; Tobias Hill
1970	Longlist	Iris Murdoch	A Fairly Honourable Defeat	Chatto & Windus	Rachel Cooke; Katie Derham; Tobias Hill
1970	Longlist	Shiva Naipaul	Fireflies	André Deutsch	Rachel Cooke; Katie Derham; Tobias Hill
1970	Longlist	Patrick O'Brian	Master and Commander	Collins	Rachel Cooke; Katie Derham; Tobias Hill
1970	Longlist	Joe Orton	Head to Toe	Methuen	Rachel Cooke; Katie Derham; Tobias Hill
1970	Longlist	Ruth Rendell	A Guilty Thing Surprised	Hutchinson	Rachel Cooke; Katie Derham; Tobias Hill
1971	Winner	V. S. Naipaul	In a Free State	Deutsch	John Gross (chair); Saul Bellow; John Fowles; Lady Antonia Fraser; Philip Toynbee
1971	Shortlist	Thomas Kilroy	The Big Chapel	Faber & Faber	John Gross (chair); Saul Bellow; John Fowles; Lady Antonia Fraser; Philip Toynbee
1971	Shortlist	Doris Lessing	Briefing for a Descent into Hell	Jonathan Cape	John Gross (chair); Saul Bellow; John Fowles; Lady Antonia Fraser; Philip Toynbee
1971	Shortlist	Mordecai Richler	St. Urbain's Horseman	Weidenfeld & Nicolson	John Gross (chair); Saul Bellow; John Fowles; Lady Antonia Fraser; Philip Toynbee
1971	Shortlist	Derek Robinson	Goshawk Squadron	Heinemann	John Gross (chair); Saul Bellow; John Fowles; Lady Antonia Fraser; Philip Toynbee
1971	Shortlist	Elizabeth Taylor	Mrs. Palfrey at the Claremont	Chatto & Windus	John Gross (chair); Saul Bellow; John Fowles; Lady Antonia Fraser; Philip Toynbee
1972	Winner	John Berger	G.	Weidenfeld & Nicolson	Cyril Connolly (chair); George Steiner; Elizabeth Bowen
1972	Shortlist	Susan Hill	The Bird of Night	Hamish Hamilton	Cyril Connolly (chair); George Steiner; Elizabeth Bowen
1972	Shortlist	Thomas Keneally	The Chant of Jimmie Blacksmith	Angus & Robertson	Cyril Connolly (chair); George Steiner; Elizabeth Bowen
1972	Shortlist	David Storey	Pasmore	Longman	Cyril Connolly (chair); George Steiner; Elizabeth Bowen
1973	Winner	J. G. Farrell	The Siege of Krishnapur	Weidenfeld & Nicolson	Karl Miller (chair); Edna O'Brien; Mary McCarthy
1973	Shortlist	Beryl Bainbridge	The Dressmaker	Duckworth	Karl Miller (chair); Edna O'Brien; Mary McCarthy
1973	Shortlist	Elizabeth Mavor	A Green Equinox	Michael Joseph	Karl Miller (chair); Edna O'Brien; Mary McCarthy
1973	Shortlist	Iris Murdoch	The Black Prince	Chatto & Windus	Karl Miller (chair); Edna O'Brien; Mary McCarthy
1974	Winners	Nadine Gordimer	The Conservationist	Jonathan Cape	Ion Trewin (chair); A. S. Byatt; Elizabeth Jane Howard
1974	Winners	Stanley Middleton	Holiday	Hutchinson	Ion Trewin (chair); A. S. Byatt; Elizabeth Jane Howard
1974	Shortlist	Kingsley Amis	Ending Up	Jonathan Cape	Ion Trewin (chair); A. S. Byatt; Elizabeth Jane Howard
1974	Shortlist	Beryl Bainbridge	The Bottle Factory Outing	Duckworth	Ion Trewin (chair); A. S. Byatt; Elizabeth Jane Howard
1974	Shortlist	C. P. Snow	In Their Wisdom	Macmillan	Ion Trewin (chair); A. S. Byatt; Elizabeth Jane Howard
1975	Winner	Ruth Prawer Jhabvala	Heat and Dust	John Murray	Angus Wilson (chair); Peter Ackroyd; Susan Hill; Roy Fuller
1975	Shortlist	Thomas Keneally	Gossip from the Forest	Collins	Angus Wilson (chair); Peter Ackroyd; Susan Hill; Roy Fuller
1976	Winner	David Storey	Saville	Jonathan Cape	Walter Allen (chair); Mary Wilson; Francis King
1976	Shortlist	André Brink	An Instant in the Wind	W. H. Allen	Walter Allen (chair); Mary Wilson; Francis King
1976	Shortlist	R. C. Hutchinson	Rising	Michael Joseph	Walter Allen (chair); Mary Wilson; Francis King
1976	Shortlist	Brian Moore	The Doctor's Wife	Jonathan Cape	Walter Allen (chair); Mary Wilson; Francis King
1976	Shortlist	Julian Rathbone	King Fisher Lives	Michael Joseph	Walter Allen (chair); Mary Wilson; Francis King
1976	Shortlist	William Trevor	The Children of Dynmouth	Bodley Head	Walter Allen (chair); Mary Wilson; Francis King
1977	Winner	Paul Scott	Staying On	Heinemann	Philip Larkin (chair); Beryl Bainbridge; Brendan Gill; David Hughes; Robin Ray
1977	Shortlist	Paul Bailey	Peter Smart's Confessions	Jonathan Cape	Philip Larkin (chair); Beryl Bainbridge; Brendan Gill; David Hughes; Robin Ray
1977	Shortlist	Caroline Blackwood	Great Granny Webster	Duckworth	Philip Larkin (chair); Beryl Bainbridge; Brendan Gill; David Hughes; Robin Ray
1977	Shortlist	Jennifer Johnston	Shadows on Our Skin	Hamish Hamilton	Philip Larkin (chair); Beryl Bainbridge; Brendan Gill; David Hughes; Robin Ray
1977	Shortlist	Penelope Lively	The Road to Lichfield	Heinemann	Philip Larkin (chair); Beryl Bainbridge; Brendan Gill; David Hughes; Robin Ray
1977	Shortlist	Barbara Pym	Quartet in Autumn	Macmillan	Philip Larkin (chair); Beryl Bainbridge; Brendan Gill; David Hughes; Robin Ray
1978	Winner	Iris Murdoch	The Sea, the Sea	Chatto & Windus	Sir Alfred Ayer (chair); Derwent May; P. H. Newby; Angela Huth; Clare Boylan
1978	Shortlist	Kingsley Amis	Jake's Thing	Hutchinson	Sir Alfred Ayer (chair); Derwent May; P. H. Newby; Angela Huth; Clare Boylan
1978	Shortlist	André Brink	Rumours of Rain	W. H. Allen	Sir Alfred Ayer (chair); Derwent May; P. H. Newby; Angela Huth; Clare Boylan
1978	Shortlist	Penelope Fitzgerald	The Bookshop	Duckworth	Sir Alfred Ayer (chair); Derwent May; P. H. Newby; Angela Huth; Clare Boylan
1978	Shortlist	Jane Gardam	God on the Rocks	Hamish Hamilton	Sir Alfred Ayer (chair); Derwent May; P. H. Newby; Angela Huth; Clare Boylan
1978	Shortlist	Bernice Rubens	A Five-Year Sentence	W. H. Allen	Sir Alfred Ayer (chair); Derwent May; P. H. Newby; Angela Huth; Clare Boylan
1979	Winner	Penelope Fitzgerald	Offshore	Collins	Lord Briggs (chair); Benny Green; Michael Ratcliffe; Hilary Spurling; Paul Theroux
1979	Shortlist	Thomas Keneally	Confederates	Collins	Lord Briggs (chair); Benny Green; Michael Ratcliffe; Hilary Spurling; Paul Theroux
1979	Shortlist	V. S. Naipaul	A Bend in the River	Deutsch	Lord Briggs (chair); Benny Green; Michael Ratcliffe; Hilary Spurling; Paul Theroux
1979	Shortlist	Julian Rathbone	Joseph	Michael Joseph	Lord Briggs (chair); Benny Green; Michael Ratcliffe; Hilary Spurling; Paul Theroux
1979	Shortlist	Fay Weldon	Praxis	Hodder & Stoughton	Lord Briggs (chair); Benny Green; Michael Ratcliffe; Hilary Spurling; Paul Theroux
1980	Winner	William Golding	Rites of Passage	Faber & Faber	David Daiches (chair); Ronald Blythe; Margaret Forster; Claire Tomalin; Brian Wenham
1980	Shortlist	Anthony Burgess	Earthly Powers	Hutchinson	David Daiches (chair); Ronald Blythe; Margaret Forster; Claire Tomalin; Brian Wenham
1980	Shortlist	J. L. Carr	A Month in the Country	Harvester	David Daiches (chair); Ronald Blythe; Margaret Forster; Claire Tomalin; Brian Wenham
1980	Shortlist	Anita Desai	Clear Light of Day	Heinemann	David Daiches (chair); Ronald Blythe; Margaret Forster; Claire Tomalin; Brian Wenham
1980	Shortlist	Alice Munro	The Beggar Maid	Viking	David Daiches (chair); Ronald Blythe; Margaret Forster; Claire Tomalin; Brian Wenham
1980	Shortlist	Julia O'Faolain	No Country for Young Men	Viking	David Daiches (chair); Ronald Blythe; Margaret Forster; Claire Tomalin; Brian Wenham
1980	Shortlist	Barry Unsworth	Pascali's Island	Michael Joseph	David Daiches (chair); Ronald Blythe; Margaret Forster; Claire Tomalin; Brian Wenham
1981	Winner	Salman Rushdie	Midnight's Children	Jonathan Cape	Professor Malcolm Bradbury (chair); Brian Aldiss; Joan Bakewell; Samuel Hynes; Hermione Lee
1981	Shortlist	Molly Keane	Good Behaviour	Deutsch	Professor Malcolm Bradbury (chair); Brian Aldiss; Joan Bakewell; Samuel Hynes; Hermione Lee
1981	Shortlist	Doris Lessing	The Sirian Experiments	Jonathan Cape	Professor Malcolm Bradbury (chair); Brian Aldiss; Joan Bakewell; Samuel Hynes; Hermione Lee
1981	Shortlist	Ian McEwan	The Comfort of Strangers	Jonathan Cape	Professor Malcolm Bradbury (chair); Brian Aldiss; Joan Bakewell; Samuel Hynes; Hermione Lee
1981	Shortlist	Ann Schlee	Rhine Journey	Macmillan	Professor Malcolm Bradbury (chair); Brian Aldiss; Joan Bakewell; Samuel Hynes; Hermione Lee
1981	Shortlist	Muriel Spark	Loitering with Intent	Bodley Head	Professor Malcolm Bradbury (chair); Brian Aldiss; Joan Bakewell; Samuel Hynes; Hermione Lee
1981	Shortlist	D. M. Thomas	The White Hotel	Gollancz	Professor Malcolm Bradbury (chair); Brian Aldiss; Joan Bakewell; Samuel Hynes; Hermione Lee
1982	Winner	Thomas Keneally	Schindler's Ark	Hodder & Stoughton	John Carey (chair); Paul Bailey; Frank Delaney; Janet Morgan; Lorna Sage
1982	Shortlist	John Arden	Silence among the Weapons	Methuen	John Carey (chair); Paul Bailey; Frank Delaney; Janet Morgan; Lorna Sage
1982	Shortlist	William Boyd	An Ice-Cream War	Hamish Hamilton	John Carey (chair); Paul Bailey; Frank Delaney; Janet Morgan; Lorna Sage
1982	Shortlist	Lawrence Durrell	Constance or Solitary Practices	Faber & Faber	John Carey (chair); Paul Bailey; Frank Delaney; Janet Morgan; Lorna Sage
1982	Shortlist	Alice Thomas Ellis	The 27th Kingdom	Duckworth	John Carey (chair); Paul Bailey; Frank Delaney; Janet Morgan; Lorna Sage
1982	Shortlist	Timothy Mo	Sour Sweet	Deutsch	John Carey (chair); Paul Bailey; Frank Delaney; Janet Morgan; Lorna Sage
1983	Winner	J. M. Coetzee	Life and Times of Michael K	Secker & Warburg	Fay Weldon (chair); Angela Carter; Terence Kilmartin; Peter Porter; Libby Purves
1983	Shortlist	Malcolm Bradbury	Rates of Exchange	Secker & Warburg	Fay Weldon (chair); Angela Carter; Terence Kilmartin; Peter Porter; Libby Purves
1983	Shortlist	John Fuller	Flying to Nowhere	Salamander	Fay Weldon (chair); Angela Carter; Terence Kilmartin; Peter Porter; Libby Purves
1983	Shortlist	Anita Mason	The Illusionist	Hamish Hamilton	Fay Weldon (chair); Angela Carter; Terence Kilmartin; Peter Porter; Libby Purves
1983	Shortlist	Salman Rushdie	Shame	Jonathan Cape	Fay Weldon (chair); Angela Carter; Terence Kilmartin; Peter Porter; Libby Purves
1983	Shortlist	Graham Swift	Waterland	Heinemann	Fay Weldon (chair); Angela Carter; Terence Kilmartin; Peter Porter; Libby Purves
1984	Winner	Anita Brookner	Hotel du Lac	Jonathan Cape	Professor Richard Cobb (chair); Anthony Curtis; Polly Devlin; John Fuller; Ted Rowlands
1984	Shortlist	J. G. Ballard	Empire of the Sun	Gollancz	Professor Richard Cobb (chair); Anthony Curtis; Polly Devlin; John Fuller; Ted Rowlands
1984	Shortlist	Julian Barnes	Flaubert's Parrot	Jonathan Cape	Professor Richard Cobb (chair); Anthony Curtis; Polly Devlin; John Fuller; Ted Rowlands
1984	Shortlist	Anita Desai	In Custody	Heinemann	Professor Richard Cobb (chair); Anthony Curtis; Polly Devlin; John Fuller; Ted Rowlands
1984	Shortlist	Penelope Lively	According to Mark	Heinemann	Professor Richard Cobb (chair); Anthony Curtis; Polly Devlin; John Fuller; Ted Rowlands
1984	Shortlist	David Lodge	Small World	Secker & Warburg	Professor Richard Cobb (chair); Anthony Curtis; Polly Devlin; John Fuller; Ted Rowlands
1985	Winner	Keri Hulme	The Bone People	Hodder & Stoughton	Norman St John-Stevas (chair); Nina Bawden; J. W. Lambert; Joanna Lumley; Marina Warner
1985	Shortlist	Peter Carey	Illywhacker	Faber & Faber	Norman St John-Stevas (chair); Nina Bawden; J. W. Lambert; Joanna Lumley; Marina Warner
1985	Shortlist	J. L. Carr	The Battle of Pollocks Crossing	Viking	Norman St John-Stevas (chair); Nina Bawden; J. W. Lambert; Joanna Lumley; Marina Warner
1985	Shortlist	Doris Lessing	The Good Terrorist	Jonathan Cape	Norman St John-Stevas (chair); Nina Bawden; J. W. Lambert; Joanna Lumley; Marina Warner
1985	Shortlist	Jan Morris	Last Letters from Hav	Viking	Norman St John-Stevas (chair); Nina Bawden; J. W. Lambert; Joanna Lumley; Marina Warner
1985	Shortlist	Iris Murdoch	The Good Apprentice	Chatto & Windus	Norman St John-Stevas (chair); Nina Bawden; J. W. Lambert; Joanna Lumley; Marina Warner
1986	Winner	Kingsley Amis	The Old Devils	Hutchinson	Anthony Thwaite (chair); Edna Healey; Isabel Quigley; Gillian Reynolds; Bernice Rubens
1986	Shortlist	Margaret Atwood	The Handmaid's Tale	Jonathan Cape	Anthony Thwaite (chair); Edna Healey; Isabel Quigley; Gillian Reynolds; Bernice Rubens
1986	Shortlist	Paul Bailey	Gabriel's Lament	Jonathan Cape	Anthony Thwaite (chair); Edna Healey; Isabel Quigley; Gillian Reynolds; Bernice Rubens
1986	Shortlist	Robertson Davies	What's Bred in the Bone	Viking	Anthony Thwaite (chair); Edna Healey; Isabel Quigley; Gillian Reynolds; Bernice Rubens
1986	Shortlist	Kazuo Ishiguro	An Artist of the Floating World	Faber & Faber	Anthony Thwaite (chair); Edna Healey; Isabel Quigley; Gillian Reynolds; Bernice Rubens
1986	Shortlist	Timothy Mo	An Insular Possession	Chatto & Windus	Anthony Thwaite (chair); Edna Healey; Isabel Quigley; Gillian Reynolds; Bernice Rubens
1987	Winner	Penelope Lively	Moon Tiger	Deutsch	P. D. James (chair); Selina Hastings; Allan Massie; Trevor McDonald; John B. Thompson
1987	Shortlist	Chinua Achebe	Anthills of the Savannah	Heinemann	P. D. James (chair); Selina Hastings; Allan Massie; Trevor McDonald; John B. Thompson
1987	Shortlist	Peter Ackroyd	Chatterton	Hamish Hamilton	P. D. James (chair); Selina Hastings; Allan Massie; Trevor McDonald; John B. Thompson
1987	Shortlist	Nina Bawden	Circles of Deceit	Macmillan	P. D. James (chair); Selina Hastings; Allan Massie; Trevor McDonald; John B. Thompson
1987	Shortlist	Brian Moore	The Colour of Blood	Jonathan Cape	P. D. James (chair); Selina Hastings; Allan Massie; Trevor McDonald; John B. Thompson
1987	Shortlist	Iris Murdoch	The Book and the Brotherhood	Chatto & Windus	P. D. James (chair); Selina Hastings; Allan Massie; Trevor McDonald; John B. Thompson
1988	Winner	Peter Carey	Oscar and Lucinda	Faber & Faber	The Rt Hon Michael Foot (chair); Sebastian Faulks; Philip French; Blake Morrison; Rose Tremain
1988	Shortlist	Bruce Chatwin	Utz	Jonathan Cape	The Rt Hon Michael Foot (chair); Sebastian Faulks; Philip French; Blake Morrison; Rose Tremain
1988	Shortlist	Penelope Fitzgerald	The Beginning of Spring	Collins	The Rt Hon Michael Foot (chair); Sebastian Faulks; Philip French; Blake Morrison; Rose Tremain
1988	Shortlist	David Lodge	Nice Work	Secker & Warburg	The Rt Hon Michael Foot (chair); Sebastian Faulks; Philip French; Blake Morrison; Rose Tremain
1988	Shortlist	Salman Rushdie	The Satanic Verses	Viking	The Rt Hon Michael Foot (chair); Sebastian Faulks; Philip French; Blake Morrison; Rose Tremain
1988	Shortlist	Marina Warner	The Lost Father	Chatto & Windus	The Rt Hon Michael Foot (chair); Sebastian Faulks; Philip French; Blake Morrison; Rose Tremain
1989	Winner	Kazuo Ishiguro	The Remains of the Day	Faber & Faber	David Lodge (chair); Maggie Gee; Helen McNeil; David Profumo; Edmund White
1989	Shortlist	Margaret Atwood	Cat's Eye	Bloomsbury	David Lodge (chair); Maggie Gee; Helen McNeil; David Profumo; Edmund White
1989	Shortlist	John Banville	The Book of Evidence	Secker & Warburg	David Lodge (chair); Maggie Gee; Helen McNeil; David Profumo; Edmund White
1989	Shortlist	Sybille Bedford	Jigsaw	Hamish Hamilton	David Lodge (chair); Maggie Gee; Helen McNeil; David Profumo; Edmund White
1989	Shortlist	James Kelman	A Disaffection	Secker & Warburg	David Lodge (chair); Maggie Gee; Helen McNeil; David Profumo; Edmund White
1989	Shortlist	Rose Tremain	Restoration	Hamish Hamilton	David Lodge (chair); Maggie Gee; Helen McNeil; David Profumo; Edmund White
1990	Winner	A. S. Byatt	Possession: A Romance	Chatto & Windus	Sir Denis Forman (chair); Susannah Clapp; A. Walton Litz; Hilary Mantel; Kate Saunders
1990	Shortlist	Beryl Bainbridge	An Awfully Big Adventure	Duckworth	Sir Denis Forman (chair); Susannah Clapp; A. Walton Litz; Hilary Mantel; Kate Saunders
1990	Shortlist	Penelope Fitzgerald	The Gate of Angels	Collins	Sir Denis Forman (chair); Susannah Clapp; A. Walton Litz; Hilary Mantel; Kate Saunders
1990	Shortlist	John McGahern	Amongst Women	Faber & Faber	Sir Denis Forman (chair); Susannah Clapp; A. Walton Litz; Hilary Mantel; Kate Saunders
1990	Shortlist	Brian Moore	Lies of Silence	Bloomsbury	Sir Denis Forman (chair); Susannah Clapp; A. Walton Litz; Hilary Mantel; Kate Saunders
1990	Shortlist	Mordecai Richler	Solomon Gursky Was Here	Chatto & Windus	Sir Denis Forman (chair); Susannah Clapp; A. Walton Litz; Hilary Mantel; Kate Saunders
1991	Winner	Ben Okri	The Famished Road	Jonathan Cape	Jeremy Treglown (chair); Penelope Fitzgerald; Jonathan Keates; Nicholas Mosley; Ann Schlee
1991	Shortlist	Martin Amis	Time's Arrow	Jonathan Cape	Jeremy Treglown (chair); Penelope Fitzgerald; Jonathan Keates; Nicholas Mosley; Ann Schlee
1991	Shortlist	Roddy Doyle	The Van	Secker & Warburg	Jeremy Treglown (chair); Penelope Fitzgerald; Jonathan Keates; Nicholas Mosley; Ann Schlee
1991	Shortlist	Rohinton Mistry	Such a Long Journey	Faber & Faber	Jeremy Treglown (chair); Penelope Fitzgerald; Jonathan Keates; Nicholas Mosley; Ann Schlee
1991	Shortlist	Timothy Mo	The Redundancy of Courage	Chatto & Windus	Jeremy Treglown (chair); Penelope Fitzgerald; Jonathan Keates; Nicholas Mosley; Ann Schlee
1991	Shortlist	William Trevor	Reading Turgenev	Viking	Jeremy Treglown (chair); Penelope Fitzgerald; Jonathan Keates; Nicholas Mosley; Ann Schlee
1992	Winners	Michael Ondaatje	The English Patient	Bloomsbury	Victoria Glendinning (chair); John Coldstream; Valentine Cunningham; Dr Harriet Harvey Wood; Mark Lawson
1992	Winners	Barry Unsworth	Sacred Hunger	Hamish Hamilton	Victoria Glendinning (chair); John Coldstream; Valentine Cunningham; Dr Harriet Harvey Wood; Mark Lawson
1992	Shortlist	Christopher Hope	Serenity House	Macmillan	Victoria Glendinning (chair); John Coldstream; Valentine Cunningham; Dr Harriet Harvey Wood; Mark Lawson
1992	Shortlist	Patrick McCabe	The Butcher Boy	Picador	Victoria Glendinning (chair); John Coldstream; Valentine Cunningham; Dr Harriet Harvey Wood; Mark Lawson
1992	Shortlist	Ian McEwan	Black Dogs	Jonathan Cape	Victoria Glendinning (chair); John Coldstream; Valentine Cunningham; Dr Harriet Harvey Wood; Mark Lawson
1992	Shortlist	Michèle Roberts	Daughters of the House	Virago	Victoria Glendinning (chair); John Coldstream; Valentine Cunningham; Dr Harriet Harvey Wood; Mark Lawson
1993	Winner	Roddy Doyle	Paddy Clarke Ha Ha Ha	Secker & Warburg	Lord Gowrie (chair); Professor Gillian Beer; Anne Chisholm; Nicholas Clee; Olivier Todd
1993	Shortlist	Tibor Fischer	Under the Frog	Polygon	Lord Gowrie (chair); Professor Gillian Beer; Anne Chisholm; Nicholas Clee; Olivier Todd
1993	Shortlist	Michael Ignatieff	Scar Tissue	Chatto & Windus	Lord Gowrie (chair); Professor Gillian Beer; Anne Chisholm; Nicholas Clee; Olivier Todd
1993	Shortlist	David Malouf	Remembering Babylon	Chatto & Windus	Lord Gowrie (chair); Professor Gillian Beer; Anne Chisholm; Nicholas Clee; Olivier Todd
1993	Shortlist	Caryl Phillips	Crossing the River	Bloomsbury	Lord Gowrie (chair); Professor Gillian Beer; Anne Chisholm; Nicholas Clee; Olivier Todd
1993	Shortlist	Carol Shields	The Stone Diaries	4th Estate	Lord Gowrie (chair); Professor Gillian Beer; Anne Chisholm; Nicholas Clee; Olivier Todd
1994	Winner	James Kelman	How Late It Was, How Late	Secker & Warburg	Professor John Bayley (chair); Rabbi Julia Neuberger; Dr Alastair Niven; Alan Taylor; James Wood
1994	Shortlist	Romesh Gunesekera	Reef	Granta Books	Professor John Bayley (chair); Rabbi Julia Neuberger; Dr Alastair Niven; Alan Taylor; James Wood
1994	Shortlist	Abdulrazak Gurnah	Paradise	Hamish Hamilton	Professor John Bayley (chair); Rabbi Julia Neuberger; Dr Alastair Niven; Alan Taylor; James Wood
1994	Shortlist	Alan Hollinghurst	The Folding Star	Chatto & Windus	Professor John Bayley (chair); Rabbi Julia Neuberger; Dr Alastair Niven; Alan Taylor; James Wood
1994	Shortlist	George Mackay Brown	Beside the Ocean of Time	John Murray	Professor John Bayley (chair); Rabbi Julia Neuberger; Dr Alastair Niven; Alan Taylor; James Wood
1994	Shortlist	Jill Paton Walsh	Knowledge of Angels	Green Bay	Professor John Bayley (chair); Rabbi Julia Neuberger; Dr Alastair Niven; Alan Taylor; James Wood
1995	Winner	Pat Barker	The Ghost Road	Viking	George Walden MP (chair); Kate Kellaway; Peter Kemp; Adam Mars-Jones; Ruth Rendell
1995	Shortlist	Justin Cartwright	In Every Face I Meet	Sceptre	George Walden MP (chair); Kate Kellaway; Peter Kemp; Adam Mars-Jones; Ruth Rendell
1995	Shortlist	Salman Rushdie	The Moor's Last Sigh	Jonathan Cape	George Walden MP (chair); Kate Kellaway; Peter Kemp; Adam Mars-Jones; Ruth Rendell
1995	Shortlist	Barry Unsworth	Morality Play	Hamish Hamilton	George Walden MP (chair); Kate Kellaway; Peter Kemp; Adam Mars-Jones; Ruth Rendell
1995	Shortlist	Tim Winton	The Riders	Picador	George Walden MP (chair); Kate Kellaway; Peter Kemp; Adam Mars-Jones; Ruth Rendell
1996	Winner	Graham Swift	Last Orders	Picador	Carmen Callil (chair); Jonathan Coe; Ian Jack; A. L. Kennedy; A. N. Wilson
1996	Shortlist	Margaret Atwood	Alias Grace	Bloomsbury	Carmen Callil (chair); Jonathan Coe; Ian Jack; A. L. Kennedy; A. N. Wilson
1996	Shortlist	Beryl Bainbridge	Every Man for Himself	Duckworth	Carmen Callil (chair); Jonathan Coe; Ian Jack; A. L. Kennedy; A. N. Wilson
1996	Shortlist	Seamus Deane	Reading in the Dark	Jonathan Cape	Carmen Callil (chair); Jonathan Coe; Ian Jack; A. L. Kennedy; A. N. Wilson
1996	Shortlist	Shena Mackay	The Orchard on Fire	Heinemann	Carmen Callil (chair); Jonathan Coe; Ian Jack; A. L. Kennedy; A. N. Wilson
1996	Shortlist	Rohinton Mistry	A Fine Balance	Faber & Faber	Carmen Callil (chair); Jonathan Coe; Ian Jack; A. L. Kennedy; A. N. Wilson
1997	Winner	Arundhati Roy	The God of Small Things	Flamingo	Professor Gillian Beer (chair); Rachel Billington; Jason Cowley; Jan Dalley; Professor Dan Jacobson
1997	Shortlist	Jim Crace	Quarantine	Viking	Professor Gillian Beer (chair); Rachel Billington; Jason Cowley; Jan Dalley; Professor Dan Jacobson
1997	Shortlist	Mick Jackson	The Underground Man	Picador	Professor Gillian Beer (chair); Rachel Billington; Jason Cowley; Jan Dalley; Professor Dan Jacobson
1997	Shortlist	Bernard MacLaverty	Grace Notes	Jonathan Cape	Professor Gillian Beer (chair); Rachel Billington; Jason Cowley; Jan Dalley; Professor Dan Jacobson
1997	Shortlist	Tim Parks	Europa	Secker & Warburg	Professor Gillian Beer (chair); Rachel Billington; Jason Cowley; Jan Dalley; Professor Dan Jacobson
1997	Shortlist	Madeleine St John	The Essence of the Thing	4th Estate	Professor Gillian Beer (chair); Rachel Billington; Jason Cowley; Jan Dalley; Professor Dan Jacobson
1998	Winner	Ian McEwan	Amsterdam	Jonathan Cape	Douglas Hurd (chair); Professor Valentine Cunningham; Penelope Fitzgerald; Miriam Gross; Nigella Lawson
1998	Shortlist	Beryl Bainbridge	Master Georgie	Duckworth	Douglas Hurd (chair); Professor Valentine Cunningham; Penelope Fitzgerald; Miriam Gross; Nigella Lawson
1998	Shortlist	Julian Barnes	England, England	Jonathan Cape	Douglas Hurd (chair); Professor Valentine Cunningham; Penelope Fitzgerald; Miriam Gross; Nigella Lawson
1998	Shortlist	Martin Booth	The Industry of Souls	Dewi Lewis	Douglas Hurd (chair); Professor Valentine Cunningham; Penelope Fitzgerald; Miriam Gross; Nigella Lawson
1998	Shortlist	Patrick McCabe	Breakfast on Pluto	Picador	Douglas Hurd (chair); Professor Valentine Cunningham; Penelope Fitzgerald; Miriam Gross; Nigella Lawson
1998	Shortlist	Magnus Mills	The Restraint of Beasts	Flamingo	Douglas Hurd (chair); Professor Valentine Cunningham; Penelope Fitzgerald; Miriam Gross; Nigella Lawson
1999	Winner	J. M. Coetzee	Disgrace	Secker & Warburg	Gerald Kaufman (chair); Shena Mackay; John Sutherland; Boyd Tonkin; Natasha Walter
1999	Shortlist	Anita Desai	Fasting, Feasting	Chatto & Windus	Gerald Kaufman (chair); Shena Mackay; John Sutherland; Boyd Tonkin; Natasha Walter
1999	Shortlist	Michael Frayn	Headlong	Faber & Faber	Gerald Kaufman (chair); Shena Mackay; John Sutherland; Boyd Tonkin; Natasha Walter
1999	Shortlist	Andrew O'Hagan	Our Fathers	Faber & Faber	Gerald Kaufman (chair); Shena Mackay; John Sutherland; Boyd Tonkin; Natasha Walter
1999	Shortlist	Ahdaf Soueif	The Map of Love	Bloomsbury	Gerald Kaufman (chair); Shena Mackay; John Sutherland; Boyd Tonkin; Natasha Walter
1999	Shortlist	Colm Tóibín	The Blackwater Lightship	Picador	Gerald Kaufman (chair); Shena Mackay; John Sutherland; Boyd Tonkin; Natasha Walter
2000	Winner	Margaret Atwood	The Blind Assassin	Bloomsbury	Simon Jenkins (chair); Professor Roy Foster; Mariella Frostrup; Caroline Gascoigne; Rose Tremain
2000	Shortlist	Trezza Azzopardi	The Hiding Place	Picador	Simon Jenkins (chair); Professor Roy Foster; Mariella Frostrup; Caroline Gascoigne; Rose Tremain
2000	Shortlist	Michael Collins	The Keepers of Truth	Phoenix House	Simon Jenkins (chair); Professor Roy Foster; Mariella Frostrup; Caroline Gascoigne; Rose Tremain
2000	Shortlist	Kazuo Ishiguro	When We Were Orphans	Faber & Faber	Simon Jenkins (chair); Professor Roy Foster; Mariella Frostrup; Caroline Gascoigne; Rose Tremain
2000	Shortlist	Matthew Kneale	English Passengers	Hamish Hamilton	Simon Jenkins (chair); Professor Roy Foster; Mariella Frostrup; Caroline Gascoigne; Rose Tremain
2000	Shortlist	Brian O'Doherty	The Deposition of Father McGreevy	Arcadia	Simon Jenkins (chair); Professor Roy Foster; Mariella Frostrup; Caroline Gascoigne; Rose Tremain
2001	Winner	Peter Carey	True History of the Kelly Gang	Faber & Faber	Kenneth Baker (chair); Philip Hensher; Michèle Roberts; Kate Summerscale; Professor Rory Watson
2001	Shortlist	Ian McEwan	Atonement	Jonathan Cape	Kenneth Baker (chair); Philip Hensher; Michèle Roberts; Kate Summerscale; Professor Rory Watson
2001	Shortlist	Andrew Miller	Oxygen	Sceptre	Kenneth Baker (chair); Philip Hensher; Michèle Roberts; Kate Summerscale; Professor Rory Watson
2001	Shortlist	David Mitchell	number9dream	Sceptre	Kenneth Baker (chair); Philip Hensher; Michèle Roberts; Kate Summerscale; Professor Rory Watson
2001	Shortlist	Rachel Seiffert	The Dark Room	William Heinemann	Kenneth Baker (chair); Philip Hensher; Michèle Roberts; Kate Summerscale; Professor Rory Watson
2001	Shortlist	Ali Smith	Hotel World	Hamish Hamilton	Kenneth Baker (chair); Philip Hensher; Michèle Roberts; Kate Summerscale; Professor Rory Watson
2001	Longlist	Beryl Bainbridge	According to Queeney	Duckworth	Kenneth Baker (chair); Philip Hensher; Michèle Roberts; Kate Summerscale; Professor Rory Watson
2001	Longlist	Derek Beaven	If the Invader Comes	4th Estate	Kenneth Baker (chair); Philip Hensher; Michèle Roberts; Kate Summerscale; Professor Rory Watson
2001	Longlist	Melvyn Bragg	A Son of War	Sceptre	Kenneth Baker (chair); Philip Hensher; Michèle Roberts; Kate Summerscale; Professor Rory Watson
2001	Longlist	Ciaran Carson	Shamrock Tea	Granta Books	Kenneth Baker (chair); Philip Hensher; Michèle Roberts; Kate Summerscale; Professor Rory Watson
2001	Longlist	Stevie Davies	The Element of Water	The Women's Press	Kenneth Baker (chair); Philip Hensher; Michèle Roberts; Kate Summerscale; Professor Rory Watson
2001	Longlist	Nadine Gordimer	The Pickup	Bloomsbury	Kenneth Baker (chair); Philip Hensher; Michèle Roberts; Kate Summerscale; Professor Rory Watson
2001	Longlist	Patricia Grace	Dogside Story	The Women's Press	Kenneth Baker (chair); Philip Hensher; Michèle Roberts; Kate Summerscale; Professor Rory Watson
2001	Longlist	Abdulrazak Gurnah	By the Sea	Bloomsbury	Kenneth Baker (chair); Philip Hensher; Michèle Roberts; Kate Summerscale; Professor Rory Watson
2001	Longlist	Nick Hornby	How to Be Good	Viking	Kenneth Baker (chair); Philip Hensher; Michèle Roberts; Kate Summerscale; Professor Rory Watson
2001	Longlist	Zvi Jagendorf	Wolfy and the Strudelbakers	Dewi Lewis	Kenneth Baker (chair); Philip Hensher; Michèle Roberts; Kate Summerscale; Professor Rory Watson
2001	Longlist	James Kelman	Translated Accounts	Secker & Warburg	Kenneth Baker (chair); Philip Hensher; Michèle Roberts; Kate Summerscale; Professor Rory Watson
2001	Longlist	Eoin McNamee	The Blue Tango	Faber & Faber	Kenneth Baker (chair); Philip Hensher; Michèle Roberts; Kate Summerscale; Professor Rory Watson
2001	Longlist	Ferdinand Mount	Fairness	Chatto & Windus	Kenneth Baker (chair); Philip Hensher; Michèle Roberts; Kate Summerscale; Professor Rory Watson
2001	Longlist	VS Naipaul	Half a Life	Picador	Kenneth Baker (chair); Philip Hensher; Michèle Roberts; Kate Summerscale; Professor Rory Watson
2001	Longlist	Philip Pullman	The Amber Spyglass	Scholastic	Kenneth Baker (chair); Philip Hensher; Michèle Roberts; Kate Summerscale; Professor Rory Watson
2001	Longlist	Manil Suri	The Death of Vishnu	Bloomsbury	Kenneth Baker (chair); Philip Hensher; Michèle Roberts; Kate Summerscale; Professor Rory Watson
2001	Longlist	Jane Urquhart	The Stone Carvers	Bloomsbury	Kenneth Baker (chair); Philip Hensher; Michèle Roberts; Kate Summerscale; Professor Rory Watson
2001	Longlist	Marina Warner	The Leto Bundle	Chatto & Windus	Kenneth Baker (chair); Philip Hensher; Michèle Roberts; Kate Summerscale; Professor Rory Watson
2002	Winner	Yann Martel	Life of Pi	Canongate	Lisa Jardine (chair); David Baddiel; Russell Celyn Jones; Salley Vickers; Erica Wagner
2002	Shortlist	Rohinton Mistry	Family Matters	Faber & Faber	Lisa Jardine (chair); David Baddiel; Russell Celyn Jones; Salley Vickers; Erica Wagner
2002	Shortlist	Carol Shields	Unless	4th Estate	Lisa Jardine (chair); David Baddiel; Russell Celyn Jones; Salley Vickers; Erica Wagner
2002	Shortlist	William Trevor	The Story of Lucy Gault	Viking	Lisa Jardine (chair); David Baddiel; Russell Celyn Jones; Salley Vickers; Erica Wagner
2002	Shortlist	Sarah Waters	Fingersmith	Virago	Lisa Jardine (chair); David Baddiel; Russell Celyn Jones; Salley Vickers; Erica Wagner
2002	Shortlist	Tim Winton	Dirt Music	Picador	Lisa Jardine (chair); David Baddiel; Russell Celyn Jones; Salley Vickers; Erica Wagner
2002	Longlist	Dannie Abse	The Strange Case of Dr Simmonds and Dr Glas	Robson Books	Lisa Jardine (chair); David Baddiel; Russell Celyn Jones; Salley Vickers; Erica Wagner
2002	Longlist	John Banville	Shroud	Picador	Lisa Jardine (chair); David Baddiel; Russell Celyn Jones; Salley Vickers; Erica Wagner
2002	Longlist	Joan Barfoot	Critical Injuries	The Women's Press	Lisa Jardine (chair); David Baddiel; Russell Celyn Jones; Salley Vickers; Erica Wagner
2002	Longlist	William Boyd	Any Human Heart	Hamish Hamilton	Lisa Jardine (chair); David Baddiel; Russell Celyn Jones; Salley Vickers; Erica Wagner
2002	Longlist	Anita Brookner	The Next Big Thing	Viking	Lisa Jardine (chair); David Baddiel; Russell Celyn Jones; Salley Vickers; Erica Wagner
2002	Longlist	Robert Edric	Peacetime	Black Swan	Lisa Jardine (chair); David Baddiel; Russell Celyn Jones; Salley Vickers; Erica Wagner
2002	Longlist	Michael Frayn	Spies	Faber & Faber	Lisa Jardine (chair); David Baddiel; Russell Celyn Jones; Salley Vickers; Erica Wagner
2002	Longlist	Linda Grant	Still Here	Little Brown	Lisa Jardine (chair); David Baddiel; Russell Celyn Jones; Salley Vickers; Erica Wagner
2002	Longlist	Philip Hensher	The Mulberry Empire	Flamingo	Lisa Jardine (chair); David Baddiel; Russell Celyn Jones; Salley Vickers; Erica Wagner
2002	Longlist	Howard Jacobson	Who's Sorry Now?	Cape	Lisa Jardine (chair); David Baddiel; Russell Celyn Jones; Salley Vickers; Erica Wagner
2002	Longlist	Jon McGregor	If Nobody Speaks of Remarkable Things	4th Estate	Lisa Jardine (chair); David Baddiel; Russell Celyn Jones; Salley Vickers; Erica Wagner
2002	Longlist	Will Self	Dorian, an Imitation	Viking	Lisa Jardine (chair); David Baddiel; Russell Celyn Jones; Salley Vickers; Erica Wagner
2002	Longlist	Zadie Smith	The Autograph Man	Hamish Hamilton	Lisa Jardine (chair); David Baddiel; Russell Celyn Jones; Salley Vickers; Erica Wagner
2002	Longlist	Colin Thubron	To the Last City	Chatto & Windus	Lisa Jardine (chair); David Baddiel; Russell Celyn Jones; Salley Vickers; Erica Wagner
2003	Winner	DBC Pierre	Vernon God Little	Faber & Faber	John Carey (Chair); A. C. Grayling; Francine Stock; Rebecca Stephens MBE; D. J. Taylor
2003	Shortlist	Monica Ali	Brick Lane	Doubleday	John Carey (Chair); A. C. Grayling; Francine Stock; Rebecca Stephens MBE; D. J. Taylor
2003	Shortlist	Margaret Atwood	Oryx and Crake	Bloomsbury	John Carey (Chair); A. C. Grayling; Francine Stock; Rebecca Stephens MBE; D. J. Taylor
2003	Shortlist	Damon Galgut	The Good Doctor	Atlantic Books	John Carey (Chair); A. C. Grayling; Francine Stock; Rebecca Stephens MBE; D. J. Taylor
2003	Shortlist	Zoë Heller	Notes on a Scandal	Viking	John Carey (Chair); A. C. Grayling; Francine Stock; Rebecca Stephens MBE; D. J. Taylor
2003	Shortlist	Clare Morrall	Astonishing Splashes of Colour	Tindal Street Press	John Carey (Chair); A. C. Grayling; Francine Stock; Rebecca Stephens MBE; D. J. Taylor
2003	Longlist	Martin Amis	Yellow Dog	Cape	John Carey (Chair); A. C. Grayling; Francine Stock; Rebecca Stephens MBE; D. J. Taylor
2003	Longlist	Carol Birch	Turn Again Home	Virago	John Carey (Chair); A. C. Grayling; Francine Stock; Rebecca Stephens MBE; D. J. Taylor
2003	Longlist	Melvyn Bragg	Crossing the Lines	Sceptre	John Carey (Chair); A. C. Grayling; Francine Stock; Rebecca Stephens MBE; D. J. Taylor
2003	Longlist	J. M. Coetzee	Elizabeth Costello	Harvill Secker	John Carey (Chair); A. C. Grayling; Francine Stock; Rebecca Stephens MBE; D. J. Taylor
2003	Longlist	Julia Darling	The Taxi Driver's Daughter	Penguin	John Carey (Chair); A. C. Grayling; Francine Stock; Rebecca Stephens MBE; D. J. Taylor
2003	Longlist	Gerard Donovan	Schopenhauer's Telescope	Scribner	John Carey (Chair); A. C. Grayling; Francine Stock; Rebecca Stephens MBE; D. J. Taylor
2003	Longlist	Barbara Gowdy	The Romantic	Harper Perennial	John Carey (Chair); A. C. Grayling; Francine Stock; Rebecca Stephens MBE; D. J. Taylor
2003	Longlist	Mark Haddon	The Curious Incident of the Dog in the Night-Time	Doubleday	John Carey (Chair); A. C. Grayling; Francine Stock; Rebecca Stephens MBE; D. J. Taylor
2003	Longlist	Francis King	The Nick of Time	Arcadia	John Carey (Chair); A. C. Grayling; Francine Stock; Rebecca Stephens MBE; D. J. Taylor
2003	Longlist	Shena Mackay	Heligoland	Cape	John Carey (Chair); A. C. Grayling; Francine Stock; Rebecca Stephens MBE; D. J. Taylor
2003	Longlist	John Murray	Jazz etc.	Flambard Press	John Carey (Chair); A. C. Grayling; Francine Stock; Rebecca Stephens MBE; D. J. Taylor
2003	Longlist	Julie Myerson	Something Might Happen	Cape	John Carey (Chair); A. C. Grayling; Francine Stock; Rebecca Stephens MBE; D. J. Taylor
2003	Longlist	Tim Parks	Judge Savage	Secker & Warburg	John Carey (Chair); A. C. Grayling; Francine Stock; Rebecca Stephens MBE; D. J. Taylor
2003	Longlist	Caryl Phillips	A Distant Shore	Secker & Warburg	John Carey (Chair); A. C. Grayling; Francine Stock; Rebecca Stephens MBE; D. J. Taylor
2003	Longlist	Jonathan Raban	Waxwings	Picador	John Carey (Chair); A. C. Grayling; Francine Stock; Rebecca Stephens MBE; D. J. Taylor
2003	Longlist	Graham Swift	The Light of Day	Simon & Schuster	John Carey (Chair); A. C. Grayling; Francine Stock; Rebecca Stephens MBE; D. J. Taylor
2003	Longlist	Barbara Trapido	Frankie and Stankie	Bloomsbury	John Carey (Chair); A. C. Grayling; Francine Stock; Rebecca Stephens MBE; D. J. Taylor
2004	Winner	Alan Hollinghurst	The Line of Beauty	Picador	Chris Smith (chair); Tibor Fischer; Robert Macfarlane; Rowan Pelling; Fiammetta Rocco
2004	Shortlist	Achmat Dangor	Bitter Fruit	Atlantic	Chris Smith (chair); Tibor Fischer; Robert Macfarlane; Rowan Pelling; Fiammetta Rocco
2004	Shortlist	Sarah Hall	The Electric Michelangelo	Faber & Faber	Chris Smith (chair); Tibor Fischer; Robert Macfarlane; Rowan Pelling; Fiammetta Rocco
2004	Shortlist	David Mitchell	Cloud Atlas	Sceptre	Chris Smith (chair); Tibor Fischer; Robert Macfarlane; Rowan Pelling; Fiammetta Rocco
2004	Shortlist	Colm Tóibín	The Master	Picador	Chris Smith (chair); Tibor Fischer; Robert Macfarlane; Rowan Pelling; Fiammetta Rocco
2004	Shortlist	Gerard Woodward	I'll Go to Bed at Noon	Chatto & Windus	Chris Smith (chair); Tibor Fischer; Robert Macfarlane; Rowan Pelling; Fiammetta Rocco
2004	Longlist	Chimamanda Ngozi Adichie	Purple Hibiscus	4th Estate	Chris Smith (chair); Tibor Fischer; Robert Macfarlane; Rowan Pelling; Fiammetta Rocco
2004	Longlist	Nadeem Aslam	Maps for Lost Lovers	Faber & Faber	Chris Smith (chair); Tibor Fischer; Robert Macfarlane; Rowan Pelling; Fiammetta Rocco
2004	Longlist	Nicola Barker	Clear: A Transparent Novel	4th Estate	Chris Smith (chair); Tibor Fischer; Robert Macfarlane; Rowan Pelling; Fiammetta Rocco
2004	Longlist	John Bemrose	The Island Walkers	John Murray	Chris Smith (chair); Tibor Fischer; Robert Macfarlane; Rowan Pelling; Fiammetta Rocco
2004	Longlist	Ronan Bennett	Havoc, in Its Third Year	Bloomsbury	Chris Smith (chair); Tibor Fischer; Robert Macfarlane; Rowan Pelling; Fiammetta Rocco
2004	Longlist	Susanna Clarke	Jonathan Strange and Mr Norrell	Bloomsbury	Chris Smith (chair); Tibor Fischer; Robert Macfarlane; Rowan Pelling; Fiammetta Rocco
2004	Longlist	Neil Cross	Always the Sun	Scribner	Chris Smith (chair); Tibor Fischer; Robert Macfarlane; Rowan Pelling; Fiammetta Rocco
2004	Longlist	Louise Dean	Becoming Strangers	Scribner	Chris Smith (chair); Tibor Fischer; Robert Macfarlane; Rowan Pelling; Fiammetta Rocco
2004	Longlist	Lewis DeSoto	A Blade of Grass	Maia	Chris Smith (chair); Tibor Fischer; Robert Macfarlane; Rowan Pelling; Fiammetta Rocco
2004	Longlist	James Hamilton-Paterson	Cooking with Fernet Branca	Faber & Faber	Chris Smith (chair); Tibor Fischer; Robert Macfarlane; Rowan Pelling; Fiammetta Rocco
2004	Longlist	Justin Haythe	The Honeymoon	Picador	Chris Smith (chair); Tibor Fischer; Robert Macfarlane; Rowan Pelling; Fiammetta Rocco
2004	Longlist	Shirley Hazzard	The Great Fire	Virago	Chris Smith (chair); Tibor Fischer; Robert Macfarlane; Rowan Pelling; Fiammetta Rocco
2004	Longlist	Gail Jones	Sixty Lights	Harvill	Chris Smith (chair); Tibor Fischer; Robert Macfarlane; Rowan Pelling; Fiammetta Rocco
2004	Longlist	Sam North	The Unnumbered	Scribner	Chris Smith (chair); Tibor Fischer; Robert Macfarlane; Rowan Pelling; Fiammetta Rocco
2004	Longlist	Nicholas Shakespeare	Snowleg	Harvill	Chris Smith (chair); Tibor Fischer; Robert Macfarlane; Rowan Pelling; Fiammetta Rocco
2004	Longlist	Matt Thorne	Cherry	Weidenfeld & Nicolson	Chris Smith (chair); Tibor Fischer; Robert Macfarlane; Rowan Pelling; Fiammetta Rocco
2005	Winner	John Banville	The Sea	Picador	John Sutherland (chair); Lindsay Duguid; Rick Gekoski; Josephine Hart; David Sexton
2005	Shortlist	Julian Barnes	Arthur and George	Jonathan Cape	John Sutherland (chair); Lindsay Duguid; Rick Gekoski; Josephine Hart; David Sexton
2005	Shortlist	Sebastian Barry	A Long Long Way	Faber & Faber	John Sutherland (chair); Lindsay Duguid; Rick Gekoski; Josephine Hart; David Sexton
2005	Shortlist	Kazuo Ishiguro	Never Let Me Go	Faber & Faber	John Sutherland (chair); Lindsay Duguid; Rick Gekoski; Josephine Hart; David Sexton
2005	Shortlist	Ali Smith	The Accidental	Hamish Hamilton	John Sutherland (chair); Lindsay Duguid; Rick Gekoski; Josephine Hart; David Sexton
2005	Shortlist	Zadie Smith	On Beauty	Hamish Hamilton	John Sutherland (chair); Lindsay Duguid; Rick Gekoski; Josephine Hart; David Sexton
2005	Longlist	Tash Aw	The Harmony Silk Factory	4th Estate	John Sutherland (chair); Lindsay Duguid; Rick Gekoski; Josephine Hart; David Sexton
2005	Longlist	J. M. Coetzee	Slow Man	Secker & Warburg	John Sutherland (chair); Lindsay Duguid; Rick Gekoski; Josephine Hart; David Sexton
2005	Longlist	Rachel Cusk	In the Fold	Faber & Faber	John Sutherland (chair); Lindsay Duguid; Rick Gekoski; Josephine Hart; David Sexton
2005	Longlist	Dan Jacobson	All for Love	Hamish Hamilton	John Sutherland (chair); Lindsay Duguid; Rick Gekoski; Josephine Hart; David Sexton
2005	Longlist	Marina Lewycka	A Short History of Tractors in Ukrainian	Viking	John Sutherland (chair); Lindsay Duguid; Rick Gekoski; Josephine Hart; David Sexton
2005	Longlist	Hilary Mantel	Beyond Black	4th Estate	John Sutherland (chair); Lindsay Duguid; Rick Gekoski; Josephine Hart; David Sexton
2005	Longlist	Ian McEwan	Saturday	Jonathan Cape	John Sutherland (chair); Lindsay Duguid; Rick Gekoski; Josephine Hart; David Sexton
2005	Longlist	James Meek	The People's Act of Love	Canongate	John Sutherland (chair); Lindsay Duguid; Rick Gekoski; Josephine Hart; David Sexton
2005	Longlist	Salman Rushdie	Shalimar the Clown	Jonathan Cape	John Sutherland (chair); Lindsay Duguid; Rick Gekoski; Josephine Hart; David Sexton
2005	Longlist	Harry Thompson	This Thing of Darkness	Headline Review	John Sutherland (chair); Lindsay Duguid; Rick Gekoski; Josephine Hart; David Sexton
2005	Longlist	William Wall	This Is The Country	Sceptre	John Sutherland (chair); Lindsay Duguid; Rick Gekoski; Josephine Hart; David Sexton
2006	Winner	Kiran Desai	The Inheritance of Loss	Hamish Hamilton	Hermione Lee (chair); Simon Armitage; Candia McWilliam; Antony Quinn; Fiona Shaw
2006	Shortlist	Kate Grenville	The Secret River	Canongate	Hermione Lee (chair); Simon Armitage; Candia McWilliam; Antony Quinn; Fiona Shaw
2006	Shortlist	M. J. Hyland	Carry Me Down	Canongate	Hermione Lee (chair); Simon Armitage; Candia McWilliam; Antony Quinn; Fiona Shaw
2006	Shortlist	Hisham Matar	In the Country of Men	Viking	Hermione Lee (chair); Simon Armitage; Candia McWilliam; Antony Quinn; Fiona Shaw
2006	Shortlist	Edward St Aubyn	Mother's Milk	Picador	Hermione Lee (chair); Simon Armitage; Candia McWilliam; Antony Quinn; Fiona Shaw
2006	Shortlist	Sarah Waters	The Night Watch	Virago	Hermione Lee (chair); Simon Armitage; Candia McWilliam; Antony Quinn; Fiona Shaw
2006	Longlist	Peter Carey	Theft: A Love Story	Faber & Faber	Hermione Lee (chair); Simon Armitage; Candia McWilliam; Antony Quinn; Fiona Shaw
2006	Longlist	Robert Edric	Gathering the Water	Black Swan	Hermione Lee (chair); Simon Armitage; Candia McWilliam; Antony Quinn; Fiona Shaw
2006	Longlist	Nadine Gordimer	Get a Life	Bloomsbury	Hermione Lee (chair); Simon Armitage; Candia McWilliam; Antony Quinn; Fiona Shaw
2006	Longlist	Howard Jacobson	Kalooki Nights	Jonathan Cape	Hermione Lee (chair); Simon Armitage; Candia McWilliam; Antony Quinn; Fiona Shaw
2006	Longlist	James Lasdun	Seven Lies	Jonathan Cape	Hermione Lee (chair); Simon Armitage; Candia McWilliam; Antony Quinn; Fiona Shaw
2006	Longlist	Mary Lawson	The Other Side of the Bridge	Chatto & Windus	Hermione Lee (chair); Simon Armitage; Candia McWilliam; Antony Quinn; Fiona Shaw
2006	Longlist	Jon McGregor	So Many Ways to Begin	Bloomsbury	Hermione Lee (chair); Simon Armitage; Candia McWilliam; Antony Quinn; Fiona Shaw
2006	Longlist	Claire Messud	The Emperor's Children	Picador	Hermione Lee (chair); Simon Armitage; Candia McWilliam; Antony Quinn; Fiona Shaw
2006	Longlist	David Mitchell	Black Swan Green	Sceptre	Hermione Lee (chair); Simon Armitage; Candia McWilliam; Antony Quinn; Fiona Shaw
2006	Longlist	Naeem Murr	The Perfect Man	William Heinemann	Hermione Lee (chair); Simon Armitage; Candia McWilliam; Antony Quinn; Fiona Shaw
2006	Longlist	Andrew O'Hagan	Be Near Me	Faber & Faber	Hermione Lee (chair); Simon Armitage; Candia McWilliam; Antony Quinn; Fiona Shaw
2006	Longlist	James Robertson	The Testament of Gideon Mack	Hamish Hamilton	Hermione Lee (chair); Simon Armitage; Candia McWilliam; Antony Quinn; Fiona Shaw
2006	Longlist	Barry Unsworth	The Ruby in Her Navel	Hamish Hamilton	Hermione Lee (chair); Simon Armitage; Candia McWilliam; Antony Quinn; Fiona Shaw
2007	Winner	Anne Enright	The Gathering	Jonathan Cape	Howard Davies (chair); Wendy Cope; Giles Foden; Ruth Scurr; Imogen Stubbs
2007	Shortlist	Nicola Barker	Darkmans	4th Estate	Howard Davies (chair); Wendy Cope; Giles Foden; Ruth Scurr; Imogen Stubbs
2007	Shortlist	Mohsin Hamid	The Reluctant Fundamentalist	Hamish Hamilton	Howard Davies (chair); Wendy Cope; Giles Foden; Ruth Scurr; Imogen Stubbs
2007	Shortlist	Lloyd Jones	Mister Pip	John Murray	Howard Davies (chair); Wendy Cope; Giles Foden; Ruth Scurr; Imogen Stubbs
2007	Shortlist	Ian McEwan	On Chesil Beach	Jonathan Cape	Howard Davies (chair); Wendy Cope; Giles Foden; Ruth Scurr; Imogen Stubbs
2007	Shortlist	Indra Sinha	Animal's People	Simon & Schuster	Howard Davies (chair); Wendy Cope; Giles Foden; Ruth Scurr; Imogen Stubbs
2007	Longlist	Edward Docx	Self Help	Picador	Howard Davies (chair); Wendy Cope; Giles Foden; Ruth Scurr; Imogen Stubbs
2007	Longlist	Peter Ho Davies	The Welsh Girl	Sceptre	Howard Davies (chair); Wendy Cope; Giles Foden; Ruth Scurr; Imogen Stubbs
2007	Longlist	Nikita Lalwani	Gifted	Penguin	Howard Davies (chair); Wendy Cope; Giles Foden; Ruth Scurr; Imogen Stubbs
2007	Longlist	Catherine O'Flynn	What Was Lost	Tindal Street Press	Howard Davies (chair); Wendy Cope; Giles Foden; Ruth Scurr; Imogen Stubbs
2007	Longlist	Michael Redhill	Consolation	William Heinemann	Howard Davies (chair); Wendy Cope; Giles Foden; Ruth Scurr; Imogen Stubbs
2007	Longlist	Tan Twan Eng	The Gift of Rain	Myrmidon	Howard Davies (chair); Wendy Cope; Giles Foden; Ruth Scurr; Imogen Stubbs
2007	Longlist	A. N. Wilson	Winnie and Wolf	Hutchinson	Howard Davies (chair); Wendy Cope; Giles Foden; Ruth Scurr; Imogen Stubbs
2008	Winner	Aravind Adiga	The White Tiger	Atlantic	Michael Portillo (chair); Alex Clark; Louise Doughty; James Heneage; Hardeep Singh Kohli
2008	Shortlist	Sebastian Barry	The Secret Scripture	Faber & Faber	Michael Portillo (chair); Alex Clark; Louise Doughty; James Heneage; Hardeep Singh Kohli
2008	Shortlist	Amitav Ghosh	Sea of Poppies	John Murray	Michael Portillo (chair); Alex Clark; Louise Doughty; James Heneage; Hardeep Singh Kohli
2008	Shortlist	Linda Grant	The Clothes on Their Backs	Virago	Michael Portillo (chair); Alex Clark; Louise Doughty; James Heneage; Hardeep Singh Kohli
2008	Shortlist	Philip Hensher	The Northern Clemency	4th Estate	Michael Portillo (chair); Alex Clark; Louise Doughty; James Heneage; Hardeep Singh Kohli
2008	Shortlist	Steve Toltz	A Fraction of the Whole	Hamish Hamilton	Michael Portillo (chair); Alex Clark; Louise Doughty; James Heneage; Hardeep Singh Kohli
2008	Longlist	Gaynor Arnold	Girl in a Blue Dress	Tindal Street Press	Michael Portillo (chair); Alex Clark; Louise Doughty; James Heneage; Hardeep Singh Kohli
2008	Longlist	John Berger	From A to X	Verso	Michael Portillo (chair); Alex Clark; Louise Doughty; James Heneage; Hardeep Singh Kohli
2008	Longlist	Michelle de Kretser	The Lost Dog	Chatto & Windus	Michael Portillo (chair); Alex Clark; Louise Doughty; James Heneage; Hardeep Singh Kohli
2008	Longlist	Mohammed Hanif	A Case of Exploding Mangoes	Jonathan Cape	Michael Portillo (chair); Alex Clark; Louise Doughty; James Heneage; Hardeep Singh Kohli
2008	Longlist	Joseph O'Neill	Netherland	4th Estate	Michael Portillo (chair); Alex Clark; Louise Doughty; James Heneage; Hardeep Singh Kohli
2008	Longlist	Salman Rushdie	The Enchantress of Florence	Jonathan Cape	Michael Portillo (chair); Alex Clark; Louise Doughty; James Heneage; Hardeep Singh Kohli
2008	Longlist	Tom Rob Smith	Child 44	Simon & Schuster	Michael Portillo (chair); Alex Clark; Louise Doughty; James Heneage; Hardeep Singh Kohli
2009	Winner	Hilary Mantel	Wolf Hall	4th Estate	James Naughtie (chair); Lucasta Miller; John Mullan; Sue Perkins; Michael Prodger
2009	Shortlist	A. S. Byatt	The Children's Book	Chatto and Windus	James Naughtie (chair); Lucasta Miller; John Mullan; Sue Perkins; Michael Prodger
2009	Shortlist	J. M. Coetzee	Summertime	Harvill Secker	James Naughtie (chair); Lucasta Miller; John Mullan; Sue Perkins; Michael Prodger
2009	Shortlist	Adam Foulds	The Quickening Maze	Jonathan Cape	James Naughtie (chair); Lucasta Miller; John Mullan; Sue Perkins; Michael Prodger
2009	Shortlist	Simon Mawer	The Glass Room	Little, Brown	James Naughtie (chair); Lucasta Miller; John Mullan; Sue Perkins; Michael Prodger
2009	Shortlist	Sarah Waters	The Little Stranger	Virago	James Naughtie (chair); Lucasta Miller; John Mullan; Sue Perkins; Michael Prodger
2009	Longlist	Sarah Hall	How to Paint a Dead Man	Faber	James Naughtie (chair); Lucasta Miller; John Mullan; Sue Perkins; Michael Prodger
2009	Longlist	Samantha Harvey	The Wilderness	Jonathan Cape	James Naughtie (chair); Lucasta Miller; John Mullan; Sue Perkins; Michael Prodger
2009	Longlist	James Lever	Me Cheeta	4th Estate	James Naughtie (chair); Lucasta Miller; John Mullan; Sue Perkins; Michael Prodger
2009	Longlist	Ed O'Loughlin	Not Untrue and Not Unkind	Penguin	James Naughtie (chair); Lucasta Miller; John Mullan; Sue Perkins; Michael Prodger
2009	Longlist	James Scudamore	Heliopolis	Harvill Secker	James Naughtie (chair); Lucasta Miller; John Mullan; Sue Perkins; Michael Prodger
2009	Longlist	Colm Tóibín	Brooklyn	Viking	James Naughtie (chair); Lucasta Miller; John Mullan; Sue Perkins; Michael Prodger
2009	Longlist	William Trevor	Love and Summer	Viking	James Naughtie (chair); Lucasta Miller; John Mullan; Sue Perkins; Michael Prodger
2010	Winner	Howard Jacobson	The Finkler Question	Bloomsbury	Andrew Motion (chair); Rosie Blau; Deborah Bull; Tom Sutcliffe; Frances Wilson
2010	Shortlist	Peter Carey	Parrot and Olivier in America	Faber & Faber	Andrew Motion (chair); Rosie Blau; Deborah Bull; Tom Sutcliffe; Frances Wilson
2010	Shortlist	Emma Donoghue	Room	Picador	Andrew Motion (chair); Rosie Blau; Deborah Bull; Tom Sutcliffe; Frances Wilson
2010	Shortlist	Damon Galgut	In a Strange Room	Atlantic Books	Andrew Motion (chair); Rosie Blau; Deborah Bull; Tom Sutcliffe; Frances Wilson
2010	Shortlist	Andrea Levy	The Long Song	Hachette	Andrew Motion (chair); Rosie Blau; Deborah Bull; Tom Sutcliffe; Frances Wilson
2010	Shortlist	Tom McCarthy	C	Jonathan Cape	Andrew Motion (chair); Rosie Blau; Deborah Bull; Tom Sutcliffe; Frances Wilson
2010	Longlist	Helen Dunmore	The Betrayal	Fig Tree	Andrew Motion (chair); Rosie Blau; Deborah Bull; Tom Sutcliffe; Frances Wilson
2010	Longlist	David Mitchell	The Thousand Autumns of Jacob de Zoet	Sceptre	Andrew Motion (chair); Rosie Blau; Deborah Bull; Tom Sutcliffe; Frances Wilson
2010	Longlist	Lisa Moore	February	Random House	Andrew Motion (chair); Rosie Blau; Deborah Bull; Tom Sutcliffe; Frances Wilson
2010	Longlist	Paul Murray	Skippy Dies	Hamish Hamilton	Andrew Motion (chair); Rosie Blau; Deborah Bull; Tom Sutcliffe; Frances Wilson
2010	Longlist	Rose Tremain	Trespass	Chatto & Windus	Andrew Motion (chair); Rosie Blau; Deborah Bull; Tom Sutcliffe; Frances Wilson
2010	Longlist	Christos Tsiolkas	The Slap	Allen & Unwin	Andrew Motion (chair); Rosie Blau; Deborah Bull; Tom Sutcliffe; Frances Wilson
2010	Longlist	Alan Warner	The Stars in the Bright Sky	Jonathan Cape	Andrew Motion (chair); Rosie Blau; Deborah Bull; Tom Sutcliffe; Frances Wilson
2011	Winner	Julian Barnes	The Sense of an Ending	Jonathan Cape	Dame Stella Rimington (chair); Matthew d'Ancona; Susan Hill; Chris Mullin; Gaby Wood
2011	Shortlist	Carol Birch	Jamrach's Menagerie	Canongate	Dame Stella Rimington (chair); Matthew d'Ancona; Susan Hill; Chris Mullin; Gaby Wood
2011	Shortlist	Patrick deWitt	The Sisters Brothers	Granta Books	Dame Stella Rimington (chair); Matthew d'Ancona; Susan Hill; Chris Mullin; Gaby Wood
2011	Shortlist	Esi Edugyan	Half-Blood Blues	Serpent's Tail	Dame Stella Rimington (chair); Matthew d'Ancona; Susan Hill; Chris Mullin; Gaby Wood
2011	Shortlist	Stephen Kelman	Pigeon English	Bloomsbury	Dame Stella Rimington (chair); Matthew d'Ancona; Susan Hill; Chris Mullin; Gaby Wood
2011	Shortlist	A D Miller	Snowdrops	Atlantic Books	Dame Stella Rimington (chair); Matthew d'Ancona; Susan Hill; Chris Mullin; Gaby Wood
2011	Longlist	Sebastian Barry	On Canaan's Side	Faber & Faber	Dame Stella Rimington (chair); Matthew d'Ancona; Susan Hill; Chris Mullin; Gaby Wood
2011	Longlist	Yvvette Edwards	A Cupboard Full of Coats	Oneworld	Dame Stella Rimington (chair); Matthew d'Ancona; Susan Hill; Chris Mullin; Gaby Wood
2011	Longlist	Alan Hollinghurst	The Stranger's Child	Picador	Dame Stella Rimington (chair); Matthew d'Ancona; Susan Hill; Chris Mullin; Gaby Wood
2011	Longlist	Patrick McGuinness	The Last Hundred Days	Seren	Dame Stella Rimington (chair); Matthew d'Ancona; Susan Hill; Chris Mullin; Gaby Wood
2011	Longlist	Alison Pick	Far to Go	Tinder Press	Dame Stella Rimington (chair); Matthew d'Ancona; Susan Hill; Chris Mullin; Gaby Wood
2011	Longlist	Jane Rogers	The Testament of Jessie Lamb	Canongate	Dame Stella Rimington (chair); Matthew d'Ancona; Susan Hill; Chris Mullin; Gaby Wood
2011	Longlist	D. J. Taylor	Derby Day	Chatto & Windus	Dame Stella Rimington (chair); Matthew d'Ancona; Susan Hill; Chris Mullin; Gaby Wood
2012	Winner	Hilary Mantel	Bring Up the Bodies	4th Estate	Sir Peter Stothard (chair); Dinah Birch; Dan Stevens; Amanda Foreman; Bharat Tandon
2012	Shortlist	Deborah Levy	Swimming Home	And Other Stories/Faber & Faber	Sir Peter Stothard (chair); Dinah Birch; Dan Stevens; Amanda Foreman; Bharat Tandon
2012	Shortlist	Alison Moore	The Lighthouse	Salt Publishing	Sir Peter Stothard (chair); Dinah Birch; Dan Stevens; Amanda Foreman; Bharat Tandon
2012	Shortlist	Will Self	Umbrella	Bloomsbury	Sir Peter Stothard (chair); Dinah Birch; Dan Stevens; Amanda Foreman; Bharat Tandon
2012	Shortlist	Tan Twan Eng	The Garden of Evening Mists	Myrmidon Books	Sir Peter Stothard (chair); Dinah Birch; Dan Stevens; Amanda Foreman; Bharat Tandon
2012	Shortlist	Jeet Thayil	Narcopolis	Faber & Faber	Sir Peter Stothard (chair); Dinah Birch; Dan Stevens; Amanda Foreman; Bharat Tandon
2012	Longlist	Nicola Barker	The Yips	4th Estate	Sir Peter Stothard (chair); Dinah Birch; Dan Stevens; Amanda Foreman; Bharat Tandon
2012	Longlist	Ned Beauman	The Teleportation Accident	Sceptre	Sir Peter Stothard (chair); Dinah Birch; Dan Stevens; Amanda Foreman; Bharat Tandon
2012	Longlist	André Brink	Philida	Harvill Secker	Sir Peter Stothard (chair); Dinah Birch; Dan Stevens; Amanda Foreman; Bharat Tandon
2012	Longlist	Michael Frayn	Skios	Faber & Faber	Sir Peter Stothard (chair); Dinah Birch; Dan Stevens; Amanda Foreman; Bharat Tandon
2012	Longlist	Rachel Joyce	The Unlikely Pilgrimage of Harold Fry	Doubleday	Sir Peter Stothard (chair); Dinah Birch; Dan Stevens; Amanda Foreman; Bharat Tandon
2012	Longlist	Sam Thompson	Communion Town	4th Estate	Sir Peter Stothard (chair); Dinah Birch; Dan Stevens; Amanda Foreman; Bharat Tandon
2013	Winner	Eleanor Catton	The Luminaries	Granta	Robert Macfarlane (chair); Martha Kearney; Stuart Kelly; Natalie Haynes; Robert Douglas-Fairhurst
2013	Shortlist	NoViolet Bulawayo	We Need New Names	Chatto & Windus	Robert Macfarlane (chair); Martha Kearney; Stuart Kelly; Natalie Haynes; Robert Douglas-Fairhurst
2013	Shortlist	Jim Crace	Harvest	Picador	Robert Macfarlane (chair); Martha Kearney; Stuart Kelly; Natalie Haynes; Robert Douglas-Fairhurst
2013	Shortlist	Jhumpa Lahiri	The Lowland	Bloomsbury	Robert Macfarlane (chair); Martha Kearney; Stuart Kelly; Natalie Haynes; Robert Douglas-Fairhurst
2013	Shortlist	Ruth Ozeki	A Tale for the Time Being	Canongate	Robert Macfarlane (chair); Martha Kearney; Stuart Kelly; Natalie Haynes; Robert Douglas-Fairhurst
2013	Shortlist	Colm Tóibín	The Testament of Mary	Viking	Robert Macfarlane (chair); Martha Kearney; Stuart Kelly; Natalie Haynes; Robert Douglas-Fairhurst
2013	Longlist	Tash Aw	Five Star Billionaire	4th Estate	Robert Macfarlane (chair); Martha Kearney; Stuart Kelly; Natalie Haynes; Robert Douglas-Fairhurst
2013	Longlist	Eve Harris	The Marrying of Chani Kaufman	Sandstone Press	Robert Macfarlane (chair); Martha Kearney; Stuart Kelly; Natalie Haynes; Robert Douglas-Fairhurst
2013	Longlist	Richard House	The Kills	Picador	Robert Macfarlane (chair); Martha Kearney; Stuart Kelly; Natalie Haynes; Robert Douglas-Fairhurst
2013	Longlist	Alison MacLeod	Unexploded	Hamish Hamilton	Robert Macfarlane (chair); Martha Kearney; Stuart Kelly; Natalie Haynes; Robert Douglas-Fairhurst
2013	Longlist	Colum McCann	TransAtlantic	Bloomsbury Publishing	Robert Macfarlane (chair); Martha Kearney; Stuart Kelly; Natalie Haynes; Robert Douglas-Fairhurst
2013	Longlist	Charlotte Mendelson	Almost English	Mantle	Robert Macfarlane (chair); Martha Kearney; Stuart Kelly; Natalie Haynes; Robert Douglas-Fairhurst
2013	Longlist	Donal Ryan	The Spinning Heart	Doubleday	Robert Macfarlane (chair); Martha Kearney; Stuart Kelly; Natalie Haynes; Robert Douglas-Fairhurst
2014	Winner	Richard Flanagan	The Narrow Road to the Deep North	Chatto & Windus	A. C. Grayling (chair); Sarah Churchwell; Jonathan Bate; Dr Daniel Glaser; Dr Alastair Niven; Erica Wagner
2014	Shortlist	Joshua Ferris	To Rise Again at a Decent Hour	Viking	A. C. Grayling (chair); Sarah Churchwell; Jonathan Bate; Dr Daniel Glaser; Dr Alastair Niven; Erica Wagner
2014	Shortlist	Karen Joy Fowler	We Are All Completely Beside Ourselves	Serpent's Tail	A. C. Grayling (chair); Sarah Churchwell; Jonathan Bate; Dr Daniel Glaser; Dr Alastair Niven; Erica Wagner
2014	Shortlist	Howard Jacobson	J	Jonathan Cape	A. C. Grayling (chair); Sarah Churchwell; Jonathan Bate; Dr Daniel Glaser; Dr Alastair Niven; Erica Wagner
2014	Shortlist	Neel Mukherjee	The Lives of Others	Chatto & Windus	A. C. Grayling (chair); Sarah Churchwell; Jonathan Bate; Dr Daniel Glaser; Dr Alastair Niven; Erica Wagner
2014	Shortlist	Ali Smith	How to Be Both	Hamish Hamilton	A. C. Grayling (chair); Sarah Churchwell; Jonathan Bate; Dr Daniel Glaser; Dr Alastair Niven; Erica Wagner
2014	Longlist	Siri Hustvedt	The Blazing World	Sceptre Press	A. C. Grayling (chair); Sarah Churchwell; Jonathan Bate; Dr Daniel Glaser; Dr Alastair Niven; Erica Wagner
2014	Longlist	Paul Kingsnorth	The Wake	Unbound	A. C. Grayling (chair); Sarah Churchwell; Jonathan Bate; Dr Daniel Glaser; Dr Alastair Niven; Erica Wagner
2014	Longlist	David Mitchell	The Bone Clocks	Sceptre Press	A. C. Grayling (chair); Sarah Churchwell; Jonathan Bate; Dr Daniel Glaser; Dr Alastair Niven; Erica Wagner
2014	Longlist	David Nicholls	Us	Hodder and Stoughton	A. C. Grayling (chair); Sarah Churchwell; Jonathan Bate; Dr Daniel Glaser; Dr Alastair Niven; Erica Wagner
2014	Longlist	Joseph O'Neill	The Dog	4th Estate	A. C. Grayling (chair); Sarah Churchwell; Jonathan Bate; Dr Daniel Glaser; Dr Alastair Niven; Erica Wagner
2014	Longlist	Richard Powers	Orfeo	Atlantic Books	A. C. Grayling (chair); Sarah Churchwell; Jonathan Bate; Dr Daniel Glaser; Dr Alastair Niven; Erica Wagner
2014	Longlist	Niall Williams	History of the Rain	Bloomsbury	A. C. Grayling (chair); Sarah Churchwell; Jonathan Bate; Dr Daniel Glaser; Dr Alastair Niven; Erica Wagner
2015	Winner	Marlon James	A Brief History of Seven Killings	Oneworld Publications	Michael Wood (chair); John Burnside; Sam Leith; Frances Osborne; Ellah Wakatama Allfrey
2015	Shortlist	Tom McCarthy	Satin Island	Jonathan Cape	Michael Wood (chair); John Burnside; Sam Leith; Frances Osborne; Ellah Wakatama Allfrey
2015	Shortlist	Chigozie Obioma	The Fishermen	One	Michael Wood (chair); John Burnside; Sam Leith; Frances Osborne; Ellah Wakatama Allfrey
2015	Shortlist	Sunjeev Sahota	The Year of the Runaways	Picador	Michael Wood (chair); John Burnside; Sam Leith; Frances Osborne; Ellah Wakatama Allfrey
2015	Shortlist	Anne Tyler	A Spool of Blue Thread	Chatto & Windus	Michael Wood (chair); John Burnside; Sam Leith; Frances Osborne; Ellah Wakatama Allfrey
2015	Shortlist	Hanya Yanagihara	A Little Life	Picador	Michael Wood (chair); John Burnside; Sam Leith; Frances Osborne; Ellah Wakatama Allfrey
2015	Longlist	Bill Clegg	Did You Ever Have a Family	Gallery/Scout	Michael Wood (chair); John Burnside; Sam Leith; Frances Osborne; Ellah Wakatama Allfrey
2015	Longlist	Anne Enright	The Green Road	Jonathan Cape	Michael Wood (chair); John Burnside; Sam Leith; Frances Osborne; Ellah Wakatama Allfrey
2015	Longlist	Laila Lalami	The Moor's Account	Bloomsbury	Michael Wood (chair); John Burnside; Sam Leith; Frances Osborne; Ellah Wakatama Allfrey
2015	Longlist	Andrew O'Hagan	The Illuminations	Faber & Faber	Michael Wood (chair); John Burnside; Sam Leith; Frances Osborne; Ellah Wakatama Allfrey
2015	Longlist	Marilynne Robinson	Lila	Virago	Michael Wood (chair); John Burnside; Sam Leith; Frances Osborne; Ellah Wakatama Allfrey
2015	Longlist	Anuradha Roy	Sleeping on Jupiter	Maclehose Press	Michael Wood (chair); John Burnside; Sam Leith; Frances Osborne; Ellah Wakatama Allfrey
2015	Longlist	Anna Smaill	The Chimes	Hodder & Stoughton	Michael Wood (chair); John Burnside; Sam Leith; Frances Osborne; Ellah Wakatama Allfrey
2016	Winner	Paul Beatty	The Sellout	Oneworld	Amanda Foreman (chair); Jon Day; David Harsent; Olivia Williams; Abdulrazak Gurnah
2016	Shortlist	Deborah Levy	Hot Milk	Hamish Hamilton	Amanda Foreman (chair); Jon Day; David Harsent; Olivia Williams; Abdulrazak Gurnah
2016	Shortlist	Graeme Macrae Burnet	His Bloody Project	Contraband	Amanda Foreman (chair); Jon Day; David Harsent; Olivia Williams; Abdulrazak Gurnah
2016	Shortlist	Ottessa Moshfegh	Eileen	Jonathan Cape	Amanda Foreman (chair); Jon Day; David Harsent; Olivia Williams; Abdulrazak Gurnah
2016	Shortlist	David Szalay	All That Man Is	Jonathan Cape	Amanda Foreman (chair); Jon Day; David Harsent; Olivia Williams; Abdulrazak Gurnah
2016	Shortlist	Madeleine Thien	Do Not Say We Have Nothing	Granta	Amanda Foreman (chair); Jon Day; David Harsent; Olivia Williams; Abdulrazak Gurnah
2016	Longlist	J. M. Coetzee	The Schooldays of Jesus	Harvill Secker	Amanda Foreman (chair); Jon Day; David Harsent; Olivia Williams; Abdulrazak Gurnah
2016	Longlist	A.L. Kennedy	Serious Sweet	Jonathan Cape	Amanda Foreman (chair); Jon Day; David Harsent; Olivia Williams; Abdulrazak Gurnah
2016	Longlist	Ian McGuire	The North Water	Scribner	Amanda Foreman (chair); Jon Day; David Harsent; Olivia Williams; Abdulrazak Gurnah
2016	Longlist	David Means	Hystopia	Faber & Faber	Amanda Foreman (chair); Jon Day; David Harsent; Olivia Williams; Abdulrazak Gurnah
2016	Longlist	Wyl Menmuir	The Many	Salt	Amanda Foreman (chair); Jon Day; David Harsent; Olivia Williams; Abdulrazak Gurnah
2016	Longlist	Virginia Reeves	Work Like Any Other	Fanfare	Amanda Foreman (chair); Jon Day; David Harsent; Olivia Williams; Abdulrazak Gurnah
2016	Longlist	Elizabeth Strout	My Name Is Lucy Barton	Viking	Amanda Foreman (chair); Jon Day; David Harsent; Olivia Williams; Abdulrazak Gurnah
2017	Winner	George Saunders	Lincoln in the Bardo	Bloomsbury	Baroness Lola Young (chair); Lila Azam Zanganeh; Sarah Hall; Colin Thubron; Tom Phillips
2017	Shortlist	Paul Auster	4 3 2 1	Faber & Faber	Baroness Lola Young (chair); Lila Azam Zanganeh; Sarah Hall; Colin Thubron; Tom Phillips
2017	Shortlist	Emily Fridlund	History of Wolves	Weidenfeld & Nicolson	Baroness Lola Young (chair); Lila Azam Zanganeh; Sarah Hall; Colin Thubron; Tom Phillips
2017	Shortlist	Mohsin Hamid	Exit West	Hamish Hamilton	Baroness Lola Young (chair); Lila Azam Zanganeh; Sarah Hall; Colin Thubron; Tom Phillips
2017	Shortlist	Fiona Mozley	Elmet	John Murray	Baroness Lola Young (chair); Lila Azam Zanganeh; Sarah Hall; Colin Thubron; Tom Phillips
2017	Shortlist	Ali Smith	Autumn	Hamish Hamilton	Baroness Lola Young (chair); Lila Azam Zanganeh; Sarah Hall; Colin Thubron; Tom Phillips
2017	Longlist	Sebastian Barry	Days without End	Faber & Faber	Baroness Lola Young (chair); Lila Azam Zanganeh; Sarah Hall; Colin Thubron; Tom Phillips
2017	Longlist	Mike McCormack	Solar Bones	Canongate	Baroness Lola Young (chair); Lila Azam Zanganeh; Sarah Hall; Colin Thubron; Tom Phillips
2017	Longlist	Jon McGregor	Reservoir 13	4th Estate	Baroness Lola Young (chair); Lila Azam Zanganeh; Sarah Hall; Colin Thubron; Tom Phillips
2017	Longlist	Arundhati Roy	The Ministry of Utmost Happiness	Hamish Hamilton	Baroness Lola Young (chair); Lila Azam Zanganeh; Sarah Hall; Colin Thubron; Tom Phillips
2017	Longlist	Kamila Shamsie	Home Fire	Bloomsbury	Baroness Lola Young (chair); Lila Azam Zanganeh; Sarah Hall; Colin Thubron; Tom Phillips
2017	Longlist	Zadie Smith	Swing Time	Hamish Hamilton	Baroness Lola Young (chair); Lila Azam Zanganeh; Sarah Hall; Colin Thubron; Tom Phillips
2017	Longlist	Colson Whitehead	The Underground Railroad	Fleet Publishing	Baroness Lola Young (chair); Lila Azam Zanganeh; Sarah Hall; Colin Thubron; Tom Phillips
2018	Winner	Anna Burns	Milkman	Faber & Faber	Kwame Anthony Appiah (chair); Val McDermid; Leo Robson; Leanne Shapton; Jacqueline Rose
2018	Shortlist	Esi Edugyan	Washington Black	Serpent's Tail	Kwame Anthony Appiah (chair); Val McDermid; Leo Robson; Leanne Shapton; Jacqueline Rose
2018	Shortlist	Daisy Johnson	Everything Under	Jonathan Cape	Kwame Anthony Appiah (chair); Val McDermid; Leo Robson; Leanne Shapton; Jacqueline Rose
2018	Shortlist	Rachel Kushner	The Mars Room	Jonathan Cape	Kwame Anthony Appiah (chair); Val McDermid; Leo Robson; Leanne Shapton; Jacqueline Rose
2018	Shortlist	Richard Powers	The Overstory	William Heinemann	Kwame Anthony Appiah (chair); Val McDermid; Leo Robson; Leanne Shapton; Jacqueline Rose
2018	Shortlist	Robin Robertson	The Long Take	Picador	Kwame Anthony Appiah (chair); Val McDermid; Leo Robson; Leanne Shapton; Jacqueline Rose
2018	Longlist	Belinda Bauer	Snap	Bantam Press	Kwame Anthony Appiah (chair); Val McDermid; Leo Robson; Leanne Shapton; Jacqueline Rose
2018	Longlist	Nick Drnaso	Sabrina	Granta	Kwame Anthony Appiah (chair); Val McDermid; Leo Robson; Leanne Shapton; Jacqueline Rose
2018	Longlist	Guy Gunaratne	In Our Mad and Furious City	Tinder Press	Kwame Anthony Appiah (chair); Val McDermid; Leo Robson; Leanne Shapton; Jacqueline Rose
2018	Longlist	Sophie Mackintosh	The Water Cure	Hamish Hamilton	Kwame Anthony Appiah (chair); Val McDermid; Leo Robson; Leanne Shapton; Jacqueline Rose
2018	Longlist	Michael Ondaatje	Warlight	Jonathan Cape	Kwame Anthony Appiah (chair); Val McDermid; Leo Robson; Leanne Shapton; Jacqueline Rose
2018	Longlist	Sally Rooney	Normal People	Faber & Faber	Kwame Anthony Appiah (chair); Val McDermid; Leo Robson; Leanne Shapton; Jacqueline Rose
2018	Longlist	Donal Ryan	From a Low and Quiet Sea	Doubleday	Kwame Anthony Appiah (chair); Val McDermid; Leo Robson; Leanne Shapton; Jacqueline Rose
2019	Winners	Margaret Atwood	The Testaments	Chatto & Windus	Peter Florence (chair); Afua Hirsch; Liz Calder; Xiaolu Guo; Joanna MacGregor
2019	Winners	Bernardine Evaristo	Girl, Woman, Other	Hamish Hamilton	Peter Florence (chair); Afua Hirsch; Liz Calder; Xiaolu Guo; Joanna MacGregor
2019	Shortlist	Lucy Ellmann	Ducks, Newburyport	Galley Beggar	Peter Florence (chair); Afua Hirsch; Liz Calder; Xiaolu Guo; Joanna MacGregor
2019	Shortlist	Chigozie Obioma	An Orchestra of Minorities	Little, Brown	Peter Florence (chair); Afua Hirsch; Liz Calder; Xiaolu Guo; Joanna MacGregor
2019	Shortlist	Salman Rushdie	Quichotte	Jonathan Cape	Peter Florence (chair); Afua Hirsch; Liz Calder; Xiaolu Guo; Joanna MacGregor
2019	Shortlist	Elif Shafak	10 Minutes 38 Seconds in This Strange World	Viking	Peter Florence (chair); Afua Hirsch; Liz Calder; Xiaolu Guo; Joanna MacGregor
2019	Longlist	Kevin Barry	Night Boat to Tangier	Canongate	Peter Florence (chair); Afua Hirsch; Liz Calder; Xiaolu Guo; Joanna MacGregor
2019	Longlist	Oyinkan Braithwaite	My Sister, the Serial Killer	Atlantic Books	Peter Florence (chair); Afua Hirsch; Liz Calder; Xiaolu Guo; Joanna MacGregor
2019	Longlist	John Lanchester	The Wall	Faber & Faber	Peter Florence (chair); Afua Hirsch; Liz Calder; Xiaolu Guo; Joanna MacGregor
2019	Longlist	Deborah Levy	The Man Who Saw Everything	Hamish Hamilton	Peter Florence (chair); Afua Hirsch; Liz Calder; Xiaolu Guo; Joanna MacGregor
2019	Longlist	Valeria Luiselli	Lost Children Archive	4th Estate	Peter Florence (chair); Afua Hirsch; Liz Calder; Xiaolu Guo; Joanna MacGregor
2019	Longlist	Max Porter	Lanny	Faber & Faber	Peter Florence (chair); Afua Hirsch; Liz Calder; Xiaolu Guo; Joanna MacGregor
2019	Longlist	Jeanette Winterson	Frankissstein	Jonathan Cape	Peter Florence (chair); Afua Hirsch; Liz Calder; Xiaolu Guo; Joanna MacGregor
2020	Winner	Douglas Stuart	Shuggie Bain	Picador	Margaret Busby (chair); Lee Child; Lemn Sissay; Sameer Rahim; Emily Wilson
2020	Shortlist	Diane Cook	The New Wilderness	Oneworld Publications	Margaret Busby (chair); Lee Child; Lemn Sissay; Sameer Rahim; Emily Wilson
2020	Shortlist	Tsitsi Dangarembga	This Mournable Body	Faber & Faber	Margaret Busby (chair); Lee Child; Lemn Sissay; Sameer Rahim; Emily Wilson
2020	Shortlist	Avni Doshi	Burnt Sugar	Hamish Hamilton, Penguin Random House	Margaret Busby (chair); Lee Child; Lemn Sissay; Sameer Rahim; Emily Wilson
2020	Shortlist	Maaza Mengiste	The Shadow King	Canongate	Margaret Busby (chair); Lee Child; Lemn Sissay; Sameer Rahim; Emily Wilson
2020	Shortlist	Brandon Taylor	Real Life	Daunt Books	Margaret Busby (chair); Lee Child; Lemn Sissay; Sameer Rahim; Emily Wilson
2020	Longlist	Gabriel Krauze	Who They Was	4th Estate	Margaret Busby (chair); Lee Child; Lemn Sissay; Sameer Rahim; Emily Wilson
2020	Longlist	Hilary Mantel	The Mirror and the Light	4th Estate	Margaret Busby (chair); Lee Child; Lemn Sissay; Sameer Rahim; Emily Wilson
2020	Longlist	Colum McCann	Apeirogon	Bloomsbury	Margaret Busby (chair); Lee Child; Lemn Sissay; Sameer Rahim; Emily Wilson
2020	Longlist	Kiley Reid	Such a Fun Age	Bloomsbury	Margaret Busby (chair); Lee Child; Lemn Sissay; Sameer Rahim; Emily Wilson
2020	Longlist	Anne Tyler	Redhead by the Side of the Road	Chatto & Windus	Margaret Busby (chair); Lee Child; Lemn Sissay; Sameer Rahim; Emily Wilson
2020	Longlist	Sophie Ward	Love and Other Thought Experiments	Corsair	Margaret Busby (chair); Lee Child; Lemn Sissay; Sameer Rahim; Emily Wilson
2020	Longlist	C Pam Zhang	How Much of These Hills Is Gold	Virago	Margaret Busby (chair); Lee Child; Lemn Sissay; Sameer Rahim; Emily Wilson
2021	Winner	Damon Galgut	The Promise	Chatto & Windus	Maya Jasanoff (chair); Horatia Harrod; Natascha McElhone; Chigozie Obioma; Rowan Williams
2021	Shortlist	Anuk Arudpragasam	A Passage North	Granta	Maya Jasanoff (chair); Horatia Harrod; Natascha McElhone; Chigozie Obioma; Rowan Williams
2021	Shortlist	Patricia Lockwood	No One Is Talking about This	Bloomsbury	Maya Jasanoff (chair); Horatia Harrod; Natascha McElhone; Chigozie Obioma; Rowan Williams
2021	Shortlist	Nadifa Mohamed	The Fortune Men	Viking	Maya Jasanoff (chair); Horatia Harrod; Natascha McElhone; Chigozie Obioma; Rowan Williams
2021	Shortlist	Richard Powers	Bewilderment	Hutchinson Heinemann	Maya Jasanoff (chair); Horatia Harrod; Natascha McElhone; Chigozie Obioma; Rowan Williams
2021	Shortlist	Maggie Shipstead	Great Circle	Doubleday	Maya Jasanoff (chair); Horatia Harrod; Natascha McElhone; Chigozie Obioma; Rowan Williams
2021	Longlist	Rachel Cusk	Second Place	Faber & Faber	Maya Jasanoff (chair); Horatia Harrod; Natascha McElhone; Chigozie Obioma; Rowan Williams
2021	Longlist	Nathan Harris	The Sweetness of Water	Tinder Press	Maya Jasanoff (chair); Horatia Harrod; Natascha McElhone; Chigozie Obioma; Rowan Williams
2021	Longlist	Kazuo Ishiguro	Klara and the Sun	Faber & Faber	Maya Jasanoff (chair); Horatia Harrod; Natascha McElhone; Chigozie Obioma; Rowan Williams
2021	Longlist	Karen Jennings	An Island	Holland House Books	Maya Jasanoff (chair); Horatia Harrod; Natascha McElhone; Chigozie Obioma; Rowan Williams
2021	Longlist	Mary Lawson	A Town Called Solace	Chatto & Windus	Maya Jasanoff (chair); Horatia Harrod; Natascha McElhone; Chigozie Obioma; Rowan Williams
2021	Longlist	Sunjeev Sahota	China Room	Harvill Secker	Maya Jasanoff (chair); Horatia Harrod; Natascha McElhone; Chigozie Obioma; Rowan Williams
2021	Longlist	Francis Spufford	Light Perpetual	Faber & Faber	Maya Jasanoff (chair); Horatia Harrod; Natascha McElhone; Chigozie Obioma; Rowan Williams
2022	Winner	Shehan Karunatilaka	The Seven Moons of Maali Almeida	Sort of Books	Neil MacGregor (chair); Shahidha Bari; Helen Castor; M. John Harrison; Alain Mabanckou
2022	Shortlist	NoViolet Bulawayo	Glory	Chatto & Windus	Neil MacGregor (chair); Shahidha Bari; Helen Castor; M. John Harrison; Alain Mabanckou
2022	Shortlist	Percival Everett	The Trees	Influx Press	Neil MacGregor (chair); Shahidha Bari; Helen Castor; M. John Harrison; Alain Mabanckou
2022	Shortlist	Alan Garner	Treacle Walker	4th Estate	Neil MacGregor (chair); Shahidha Bari; Helen Castor; M. John Harrison; Alain Mabanckou
2022	Shortlist	Claire Keegan	Small Things like These	Faber & Faber	Neil MacGregor (chair); Shahidha Bari; Helen Castor; M. John Harrison; Alain Mabanckou
2022	Shortlist	Elizabeth Strout	Oh William!	Viking	Neil MacGregor (chair); Shahidha Bari; Helen Castor; M. John Harrison; Alain Mabanckou
2022	Longlist	Graeme Macrae Burnet	Case Study	Saraband	Neil MacGregor (chair); Shahidha Bari; Helen Castor; M. John Harrison; Alain Mabanckou
2022	Longlist	Hernán Díaz	Trust	Picador	Neil MacGregor (chair); Shahidha Bari; Helen Castor; M. John Harrison; Alain Mabanckou
2022	Longlist	Karen Joy Fowler	Booth	Serpent's Tail	Neil MacGregor (chair); Shahidha Bari; Helen Castor; M. John Harrison; Alain Mabanckou
2022	Longlist	Audrey Magee	The Colony	Faber & Faber	Neil MacGregor (chair); Shahidha Bari; Helen Castor; M. John Harrison; Alain Mabanckou
2022	Longlist	Maddie Mortimer	Maps of Our Spectacular Bodies	Picador	Neil MacGregor (chair); Shahidha Bari; Helen Castor; M. John Harrison; Alain Mabanckou
2022	Longlist	Leila Mottley	Nightcrawling	Bloomsbury	Neil MacGregor (chair); Shahidha Bari; Helen Castor; M. John Harrison; Alain Mabanckou
2022	Longlist	Selby Wynn Schwartz	After Sappho	Galley Beggar	Neil MacGregor (chair); Shahidha Bari; Helen Castor; M. John Harrison; Alain Mabanckou
2023	Winner	Paul Lynch	Prophet Song	Oneworld Publications	Esi Edugyan (chair); Adjoa Andoh; Mary Jean Chan; James S. Shapiro; Robert Webb
2023	Shortlist	Sarah Bernstein	Study for Obedience	Granta	Esi Edugyan (chair); Adjoa Andoh; Mary Jean Chan; James S. Shapiro; Robert Webb
2023	Shortlist	Jonathan Escoffery	If I Survive You	4th Estate	Esi Edugyan (chair); Adjoa Andoh; Mary Jean Chan; James S. Shapiro; Robert Webb
2023	Shortlist	Paul Harding	This Other Eden	Hutchinson Heinemann	Esi Edugyan (chair); Adjoa Andoh; Mary Jean Chan; James S. Shapiro; Robert Webb
2023	Shortlist	Paul Murray	The Bee Sting	Hamish Hamilton	Esi Edugyan (chair); Adjoa Andoh; Mary Jean Chan; James S. Shapiro; Robert Webb
2023	Shortlist	Chetna Maroo	Western Lane	Picador	Esi Edugyan (chair); Adjoa Andoh; Mary Jean Chan; James S. Shapiro; Robert Webb
2023	Longlist	Ayobami Adebayo	A Spell of Good Things	Canongate	Esi Edugyan (chair); Adjoa Andoh; Mary Jean Chan; James S. Shapiro; Robert Webb
2023	Longlist	Sebastian Barry	Old God's Time	Faber & Faber	Esi Edugyan (chair); Adjoa Andoh; Mary Jean Chan; James S. Shapiro; Robert Webb
2023	Longlist	Elaine Feeney	How to Build a Boat	Harvill Secker	Esi Edugyan (chair); Adjoa Andoh; Mary Jean Chan; James S. Shapiro; Robert Webb
2023	Longlist	Siân Hughes	Pearl	Indigo Press	Esi Edugyan (chair); Adjoa Andoh; Mary Jean Chan; James S. Shapiro; Robert Webb
2023	Longlist	Viktoria Lloyd-Barlow	All the Little Bird-Hearts	Tinder Press	Esi Edugyan (chair); Adjoa Andoh; Mary Jean Chan; James S. Shapiro; Robert Webb
2023	Longlist	Martin MacInnes	In Ascension	Atlantic Books	Esi Edugyan (chair); Adjoa Andoh; Mary Jean Chan; James S. Shapiro; Robert Webb
2023	Longlist	Tan Twan Eng	The House of Doors	Canongate	Esi Edugyan (chair); Adjoa Andoh; Mary Jean Chan; James S. Shapiro; Robert Webb
2024	Winner	Samantha Harvey	Orbital	Jonathan Cape	Edmund de Waal (chair); Sara Collins; Justine Jordan; Yiyun Li; Nitin Sawhney
2024	Shortlist	Percival Everett	James	Mantle	Edmund de Waal (chair); Sara Collins; Justine Jordan; Yiyun Li; Nitin Sawhney
2024	Shortlist	Rachel Kushner	Creation Lake	Jonathan Cape	Edmund de Waal (chair); Sara Collins; Justine Jordan; Yiyun Li; Nitin Sawhney
2024	Shortlist	Anne Michaels	Held	Bloomsbury	Edmund de Waal (chair); Sara Collins; Justine Jordan; Yiyun Li; Nitin Sawhney
2024	Shortlist	Yael van der Wouden	The Safekeep	Viking	Edmund de Waal (chair); Sara Collins; Justine Jordan; Yiyun Li; Nitin Sawhney
2024	Shortlist	Charlotte Wood	Stone Yard Devotional	Sceptre	Edmund de Waal (chair); Sara Collins; Justine Jordan; Yiyun Li; Nitin Sawhney
2024	Longlist	Colin Barrett	Wild Houses	Jonathan Cape	Edmund de Waal (chair); Sara Collins; Justine Jordan; Yiyun Li; Nitin Sawhney
2024	Longlist	Rita Bullwinkel	Headshot	Daunt Books Originals	Edmund de Waal (chair); Sara Collins; Justine Jordan; Yiyun Li; Nitin Sawhney
2024	Longlist	Hisham Matar	My Friends	Viking	Edmund de Waal (chair); Sara Collins; Justine Jordan; Yiyun Li; Nitin Sawhney
2024	Longlist	Claire Messud	This Strange Eventful History	Fleet	Edmund de Waal (chair); Sara Collins; Justine Jordan; Yiyun Li; Nitin Sawhney
2024	Longlist	Tommy Orange	Wandering Stars	Harvill Secker	Edmund de Waal (chair); Sara Collins; Justine Jordan; Yiyun Li; Nitin Sawhney
2024	Longlist	Sarah Perry	Enlightenment	Jonathan Cape	Edmund de Waal (chair); Sara Collins; Justine Jordan; Yiyun Li; Nitin Sawhney
2024	Longlist	Richard Powers	Playground	Hutchinson Heinemann	Edmund de Waal (chair); Sara Collins; Justine Jordan; Yiyun Li; Nitin Sawhney
2025	Winner	David Szalay	Flesh	Jonathan Cape	Roddy Doyle (chair); Ayọ̀bámi Adébáyọ̀; Sarah Jessica Parker; Chris Power; Kiley Reid
2025	Shortlist	Susan Choi	Flashlight	Jonathan Cape	Roddy Doyle (chair); Ayọ̀bámi Adébáyọ̀; Sarah Jessica Parker; Chris Power; Kiley Reid
2025	Shortlist	Kiran Desai	The Loneliness of Sonia and Sunny	Hamish Hamilton	Roddy Doyle (chair); Ayọ̀bámi Adébáyọ̀; Sarah Jessica Parker; Chris Power; Kiley Reid
2025	Shortlist	Katie Kitamura	Audition	Fern Press	Roddy Doyle (chair); Ayọ̀bámi Adébáyọ̀; Sarah Jessica Parker; Chris Power; Kiley Reid
2025	Shortlist	Ben Markovits	The Rest of Our Lives	Faber	Roddy Doyle (chair); Ayọ̀bámi Adébáyọ̀; Sarah Jessica Parker; Chris Power; Kiley Reid
2025	Shortlist	Andrew Miller	The Land in Winter	Sceptre	Roddy Doyle (chair); Ayọ̀bámi Adébáyọ̀; Sarah Jessica Parker; Chris Power; Kiley Reid
2025	Longlist	Claire Adam	Love Forms	Faber	Roddy Doyle (chair); Ayọ̀bámi Adébáyọ̀; Sarah Jessica Parker; Chris Power; Kiley Reid
2025	Longlist	Tash Aw	The South	4th Estate	Roddy Doyle (chair); Ayọ̀bámi Adébáyọ̀; Sarah Jessica Parker; Chris Power; Kiley Reid
2025	Longlist	Natasha Brown	Universality	Faber	Roddy Doyle (chair); Ayọ̀bámi Adébáyọ̀; Sarah Jessica Parker; Chris Power; Kiley Reid
2025	Longlist	Jonathan Buckley	One Boat	Fitzcarraldo Editions	Roddy Doyle (chair); Ayọ̀bámi Adébáyọ̀; Sarah Jessica Parker; Chris Power; Kiley Reid
2025	Longlist	Maria Reva	Endling	Virago/Little, Brown	Roddy Doyle (chair); Ayọ̀bámi Adébáyọ̀; Sarah Jessica Parker; Chris Power; Kiley Reid
2025	Longlist	Benjamin Wood	Seascraper	Viking	Roddy Doyle (chair); Ayọ̀bámi Adébáyọ̀; Sarah Jessica Parker; Chris Power; Kiley Reid
2025	Longlist	Ledia Xhoga	Misinterpretation	Daunt Books Originals	Roddy Doyle (chair); Ayọ̀bámi Adébáyọ̀; Sarah Jessica Parker; Chris Power; Kiley Reid
2026	Winner	M. John Harrison	The End of Everything	Serpent's Tail	Mary Beard (chair); Raymond Antrobus; Jarvis Cocker; Patricia Lockwood; Rebecca Liu
2026	Shortlist	Marlon James	The Disappearers	Hamish Hamilton	Mary Beard (chair); Raymond Antrobus; Jarvis Cocker; Patricia Lockwood; Rebecca Liu
2026	Shortlist	Luke Kennard	Black Bag	John Murray	Mary Beard (chair); Raymond Antrobus; Jarvis Cocker; Patricia Lockwood; Rebecca Liu
2026	Shortlist	Rebecca Perry	May We Feed the King	Granta	Mary Beard (chair); Raymond Antrobus; Jarvis Cocker; Patricia Lockwood; Rebecca Liu
2026	Shortlist	Elizabeth Strout	The Things We Never Say	Viking Press	Mary Beard (chair); Raymond Antrobus; Jarvis Cocker; Patricia Lockwood; Rebecca Liu
2026	Shortlist	Douglas Stuart	John of John	Picador	Mary Beard (chair); Raymond Antrobus; Jarvis Cocker; Patricia Lockwood; Rebecca Liu
2026	Longlist	Chloe Aridjis	The Shadow of the Object	Chatto & Windus	Mary Beard (chair); Raymond Antrobus; Jarvis Cocker; Patricia Lockwood; Rebecca Liu
2026	Longlist	Emma Cline	Switzy	Chatto & Windus	Mary Beard (chair); Raymond Antrobus; Jarvis Cocker; Patricia Lockwood; Rebecca Liu
2026	Longlist	Makenna Goodman	Helen of Nowhere	Fitzcarraldo Editions	Mary Beard (chair); Raymond Antrobus; Jarvis Cocker; Patricia Lockwood; Rebecca Liu
2026	Longlist	Kenan Orhan	The Renovation	Hamish Hamilton	Mary Beard (chair); Raymond Antrobus; Jarvis Cocker; Patricia Lockwood; Rebecca Liu
2026	Longlist	Gwendoline Riley	The Palm House	Picador	Mary Beard (chair); Raymond Antrobus; Jarvis Cocker; Patricia Lockwood; Rebecca Liu
2026	Longlist	Djamel White	All Them Dogs	John Murray	Mary Beard (chair); Raymond Antrobus; Jarvis Cocker; Patricia Lockwood; Rebecca Liu
2026	Longlist	Missouri Williams	The Vivisectors	4th Estate	Mary Beard (chair); Raymond Antrobus; Jarvis Cocker; Patricia Lockwood; Rebecca Liu

== Writers with multiple awards ==
Five authors have won the award twice:

- Margaret Atwood
- Peter Carey
- J. M. Coetzee
- J. G. Farrell (Note: Farrell was retroactively awarded the Lost Man Booker Prize since books published in 1970 were not eligible due to a rules alteration.)
- Hilary Mantel

== Writers with multiple nominations ==
The following writers have received two or more nominations:

7 nominations

- Salman Rushdie

6 nominations

- Margaret Atwood
- Beryl Bainbridge
- J. M. Coetzee
- Ian McEwan
- Iris Murdoch

5 nominations

- Sebastian Barry
- Peter Carey
- Kazuo Ishiguro
- David Mitchell
- William Trevor

4 nominations

- Julian Barnes
- Anita Desai
- Penelope Fitzgerald
- Howard Jacobson
- Thomas Keneally
- Hilary Mantel
- Richard Powers
- Ali Smith
- Colm Toibin
- Barry Unsworth

3 nominations

- Kingsley Amis
- John Banville
- Nicola Barker
- Andre Brink
- Michael Frayn
- Damon Galgut
- Nadine Gordimer
- Alan Hollinghurst
- James Kelman
- Doris Lessing
- Deborah Levy
- Penelope Lively
- Jon McGregor
- Rohinton Mistry
- Timothy Mo
- Brian Moore
- Andrew O'Hagan
- V. S. Naipaul
- Zadie Smith
- Muriel Spark
- Elizabeth Strout
- Graham Swift
- Sarah Waters

2 nominations

- Martin Amis
- Tash Aw
- Paul Bailey
- Nina Bawden
- John Berger
- Carol Birch
- William Boyd
- Melvyn Bragg
- Anita Brookner
- NoViolet Bulawayo
- Graeme Macrae Burnet
- A. S. Byatt
- J. L. Carr
- Jim Crace
- Rachel Cusk
- Kiran Desai
- Roddy Doyle
- Esi Edugyan
- Robert Edric
- Tan Twan Eng
- J. G. Farrell
- Marlon James
- Karen Joy Fowler
- Linda Grant
- Abdulrazak Gurnah
- Sarah Hall
- Mohsin Hamid
- Shirley Hazzard
- Philip Hensher
- Rachel Kushner
- Mary Lawson
- David Lodge
- Patrick McCabe
- Colum McCann
- Tom McCarthy
- Shena Mackay
- Andrew Miller
- Chigozie Obioma
- Michael Ondaatje
- Joseph O'Neill
- Tim Parks
- Caryl Phillips
- Julian Rathbone
- Mordecai Richler
- Arundhati Roy
- Bernice Rubens
- Donal Ryan
- Sunjeev Sahota
- Will Self
- Carol Shields
- David Storey
- Douglas Stuart
- David Szalay
- Rose Tremain
- Anne Tyler
- Marina Warner
- Tim Winton
