= Kylemore =

Kylemore may refer to:

- Kylemore, Saskatchewan, Canada, an unincorporated community
- Kylemore, Western Cape, South Africa, a village
- Kylemore Abbey, a Benedictine monastery on the grounds of Kylemore Castle, in Connemara, County Galway, Ireland
- Kylemore College, a secondary school in Ballyfermot, Dublin, Ireland
