= 2026 Booker Prize =

British literary award

- Date: 9 November 2026
- Location: Old Billingsgate, London
- Country: United Kingdom & Ireland

M. John Harrison, winner of the 2026 Booker Prize

The 2026 Booker Prize is a literary award worth £50,000 given for the best English-language novel published between 1 October 2025 and 30 September 2026 in either the United Kingdom or Ireland.

The judges considered a total of 163 books for the 2026 Booker Prize. The longlist (13 books) was released on 28 July 2026 and the shortlist (six books) was announced at a ceremony at the Southbank Centre in London on 22 September.

On 9 November 2026, at Old Billingsgate in the City of London, the winner was announced as The End of Everything by English author M. John Harrison, the first science fiction writer to be a recipient of the prize and at 81 the oldest winner, with a writing career spanning 60 years. "A dystopian satire that probes the limits of human understanding", the novel at 198 pages was the shortest among the finalists and is the first Booker win for independent publisher Serpent's Tail.

== Judging panel ==
- Mary Beard (chair), classicist, writer and broadcaster
- Raymond Antrobus, writer and educator
- Jarvis Cocker, musician, writer and broadcaster
- Rebecca Liu, journalist, editor and critic
- Patricia Lockwood, poet and essayist, shortlisted for the 2021 Booker

== Nominees ==
All 2026 nominees were novels.

indicates the winner
indicates shortlisted

Author	Title	Country	Publisher
Chloe Aridjis	The Shadow of the Object	Mexico/UK	Chatto & Windus
Emma Cline	Switzy	USA	Chatto & Windus
Makenna Goodman	Helen of Nowhere	USA	Fitzcarraldo Editions
M. John Harrison	The End of Everything	UK	Serpent's Tail
Marlon James	The Disappearers	Jamaica	Hamish Hamilton
Luke Kennard	Black Bag	UK	John Murray
Kenan Orhan	The Renovation	Turkey/USA	Hamish Hamilton
Rebecca Perry	May We Feed the King	UK	Granta
Gwendoline Riley	The Palm House	UK	Picador
Elizabeth Strout	The Things We Never Say	USA	Viking Press
Douglas Stuart	John of John	UK/USA	Picador
Djamel White	All Them Dogs	Ireland	John Murray
Missouri Williams	The Vivisectors	UK	4th Estate

== See also ==
- List of winners and nominated authors of the Booker Prize
