= Djamel White =

Irish author

- Born: 1997 (age 28–29); Dublin, Ireland
- Education: University College Dublin (BA, MFA)
- Occupations: Writer, editor
- Writing career
- Genres: fiction, crime fiction, noir
- Notable work: All Them Dogs
- Website: djamelwhite.com

Djamel White (born 1997) is an Irish writer known for his debut novel, All Them Dogs, which was longlisted for the 2026 Booker Prize.

== Early life and education ==
Djamel White was born in Lucan, Dublin, Ireland and grew up in Cavan and Lucan, being raised by his mother and stepfather. His mother met his biological father, an Algerian man, when she was studying abroad in France. White's biological father is estranged from his family, and White has never met him. In an interview with The Irish Times, White described feelings of alienation growing up, stating: "I didn't feel like I fit in at school or at home." White described a difficult childhood where he felt neglected by his stepfather, especially after the birth of his brother, unfulfilled and unmotivated at school, and a sense of not belonging with his friends. White dropped out of secondary school at age 17.

After secondary school, he became a student and facilitator at Fighting Words, the creative writing workshop for adults and children in Dublin founded by Roddy Doyle and Sean Love. Struggling with drugs and alcohol after leaving school early, White credited his new role teaching creative writing to school children with Fighting Words as giving his life a renewed purpose.

White enrolled in a special program at Kylemore College for students who left secondary school early. He is a two time graduate of University College Dublin, where he earned a Bachelor of Arts in English and creative writing in 2022 and a Master of Fine Arts in creative writing in 2023. While at University College, his mentor was fellow author Anne Enright.

== Career ==
White was fiction editor for the inaugural issue of the literary and art journal Profiles. He has worked as an assistant for New Island Books and has managed one of Ireland’s leading tattoo shops. He has been the recipient of a Literature Bursary Award and an Agility Award from the Arts Council of Ireland.

=== All Them Dogs (2026) ===
White developed All Them Dogs from his short story "Blue Opel." The debut novel was published on May 19, 2026 by John Murray Press and Riverhead Books. Kirkus Reviews gave the book a starred review: "A debut novel of rare force and control...keeps us balanced on a knife-edge, and the novel’s final revelations churn for days."

All Them Dogs tells the story of the gangster Tony "Wardy" Ward, who returns to Dublin after 5 years of exile to work once more as an organized crime enforcer. Tony is paired by his boss Aengus Lavelle to work with fellow enforcer Darren "Flute" Walsh. As the two men work together in their new roles, collecting debts and dues from drug dealers (sometimes by force), a romantic relationship develops between them. The fleeting relationship between the two men becomes strained as Tony becomes suspicious of Flute when the two are tasked with collecting from and killing subordinate drug dealer Patsy.

Jake Arnott at The Guardian praised White for his masterful description of gritty settings in the criminal underworld in the neo-noir tradition. "His ability to conjure a downbeat world of rundown estates, boxing gyms and tattoo parlours is truly compelling, and there’s a real dynamism to his prose that combines street slang with poetic simile." However, Arnott criticized the novel for not adequately developing the romance between the two gangsters. He stated this lack of passionate romance between the two characters contributed to a lack of tension in the novel's latter chapters when Tony and Flute's relationship fractures after a betrayal.

The novel was longlisted for the 2026 Booker Prize. The judging panel stated: "By turns savage, thrilling and unexpectedly tender, All Them Dogs is a gripping story of violence, lust, and greed that explores one man's struggles to find his place in an unsparing world." Lead judge, Mary Beard, commended White's racy dialogue and layered characterizations, stating that White was able to reveal glimpses of "textured humanity woven among the violent hyper-masculine protagonists." He was one of three debut novelists to be longlisted for the prize in 2026, and the only writer of African descent.

== Bibliography ==
- All Them Dogs: A Novel. John Murray Press & Riverhead Books. 2026. ISBN 9798217046676.
