= Bruno's Dream =

Novel by Iris Murdoch

- Cover of the first edition
- Author: Iris Murdoch
- Cover artist: Patricia Davey
- Language: English
- Publisher: Chatto & Windus
- Publication date: 1969
- Publication place: United Kingdom
- Media type: Print (Hardcover)
- Pages: 293
- ISBN: 0701114266
- OCLC: 251613990

Bruno's Dream is a novel by Iris Murdoch. Published in 1969, it was her twelfth novel.

== Plot ==
Set in London, the novel tells the story of a dying man called Bruno and his family. Narrated in the third person that allows for multiple character perspectives it follows Bruno, Bruno's son Miles, Miles' wife Diana and her sister Lisa, Bruno's son-in-law Danby, Bruno's nurse Adelaide, Nigel (the messianic figure consistently found in Murdoch's novels) and Nigel's twin brother, Will. The novel ends with all the different people, other than Nigel, coupling up.

Couples: Miles and Parvati (1st wife), Miles and Diana (2nd wife), Miles and Lisa (Diana's sister) they love each other but never get together. Danby and Gwen (1st wife and Bruno's daughter), Danby and Adelaide (his maid/mistress), Danby and Diana- they go dancing once and he proposes an affair, but it doesn't come to fruition. Danby and Lisa (they end up together at the end of the novel. Bruno and Janie (his wife), Bruno and Maureen (his mistress). Will and Adelaide (cousins) In the end the couples are Miles and Diana, Danby and Lisa, Bruno and Diana, and Will and Adelaide.

== Awards and nominations ==
Bruno's Dream was shortlisted for the 1970 Booker Prize.
