= Kenan Orhan =

Turkish-American writer (born 1993)

- Born: 1993 (age 32–33); Overland Park, Kansas, U.S.
- Education: Kansas State University (BA); Emerson College (MFA)
- Occupation: Writer
- Writing career
- Notable work: The Renovation
- Notable awards: O. Henry Award

Kenan Orhan is a Turkish-American writer and a recipient of the O. Henry Award. His debut novel, The Renovation, was longlisted for the 2026 Booker Prize.

== Early life and education ==
Orhan was born in 1993 in Overland Park, Kansas where he grew up. He spent much of his childhood traveling to Turkey. He graduated from Kansas State University with a BA in history and English in 2015. He received an MFA from Emerson College in Boston, Massachusetts.

== Career ==
He has published short stories in The Atlantic, The Paris Review, The Massachusetts Review, Prairie Schooner, The Common, and The Best American Short Stories 2022. He previously taught creative writing at the Kansas City Art Institute.

His debut short story collection, I Am My Country, was published in 2023 by Random House. In 2024, the collection was a finalist for the PEN/Robert W. Bingham Prize and longlisted for The Story Prize.

His debut novel, The Renovation, was published in 2026 by Farrar, Straus and Giroux. The novel revolves around a Turkish emigré named Dilara who hires builders to renovate a bathroom in her home in Italy in order to accommodate her Alzheimer’s-suffering father. Instead of a bathroom, she discovers a fully functioning prison, complete with guards and inmates. The book was longlisted for the 2026 Booker Prize and the 2026 National Book Award for Fiction.

== Personal life ==
He lives in Kansas City, Missouri.

== Selected works ==
=== Collections ===
- I Am My Country. Random House. 2023. ISBN 9780593449462.

=== Novels ===
- The Renovation. Farrar, Straus and Giroux. 2026. ISBN 9780374609429.

=== Anthologies ===
- The Best American Short Stories 2022. Mariner Books. 2022. ISBN 9780358664710.
