= Robert Edric =

British novelist

- Born: Gary Edric Armitage; 14 April 1956 (age 70); Sheffield, England
- Education: University of Hull
- Occupation: Novelist
- Spouse: Sara Jones (m. 1978)
- Writing career
- Pen name: Robert Edric
- Notable awards: James Tait Black Memorial Prize (1985)

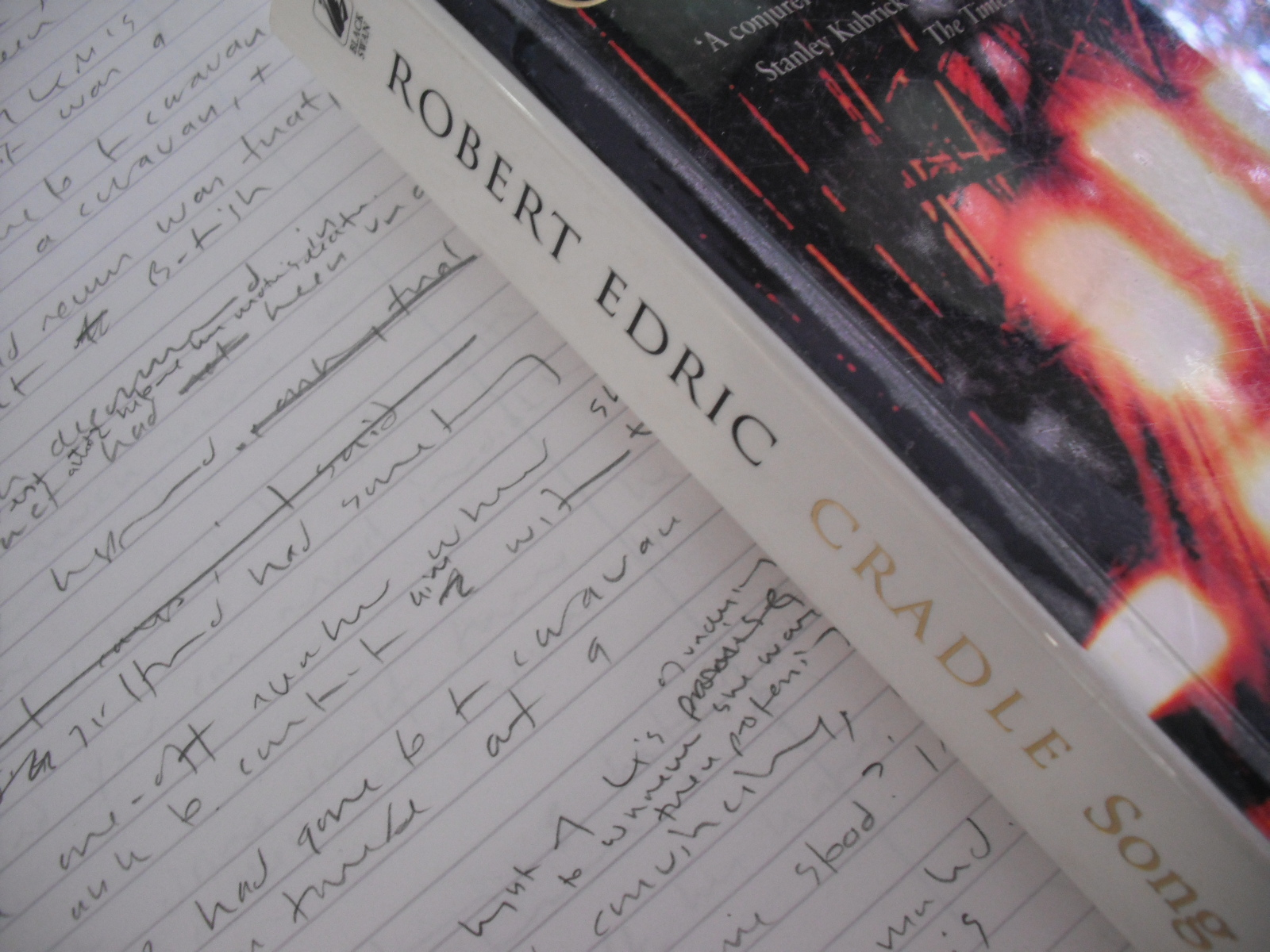
Manuscript from the Robert Edric Archive, University of East Anglia

Robert Edric (born 14 April 1956) is the pseudonym of Gary Edric Armitage, a British novelist born in Sheffield. Nick Rennison has suggested that Edric might be "the finest and most adventurous writer of historical fiction of his generation".

His trilogy of detective novels, Cradle Song, Siren Song, and Swan Song, also known as the "Song Cycle," are set in the city of Hull.

== Works ==
- Winter Garden (1985) – winner, 1985 James Tait Black Award
- A New Ice Age (1986) – runner up, 1986 Guardian Fiction Award
- A Lunar Eclipse (1989)
- In The Days of the American Museum (1990)
- The Broken Lands (1992)
- Hallowed Ground (1993)
- The Earth Made of Glass (1994)
- Elysium (1995)
- In Desolate Heaven (1997)
- The Sword Cabinet (1999)
- The Book of the Heathen (2000)
- Peacetime (2002) – long listed, 2002 Man Booker Prize
- Cradle Song (2003)
- Siren Song (2004)
- Swan Song (2005)
- The Mermaids (2006)
- Gathering the Water (2006) – long listed, 2006 Man Booker Prize
- The Kingdom of Ashes (2007)
- In Zodiac Light (2008)
- Salvage (2010)
- The Lives of the Savages (2010)
- The London Satyr (2011)
- The Devil's Beat (2012)
- The Monster's Lament (2013)
- Sanctuary (2014)
- Field Service (2015)
- The Wrack Line (2016)
- Mercury Falling (2018)
