= The End of Everything (Harrison novel) =

2026 post-apocalyptic novel by M. John Harrison

- Author: M. John Harrison
- Genre: Post-Apocalyptic Fiction
- Set in: Kent, in the near future
- Publisher: Serpent's Tail
- Publication place: London
- English publication date: 18 June 2026
- Pages: 208
- Awards: Booker Prize (2026)
- ISBN: 9781800812949
- Website: Serpent's Tail

The End of Everything is a post-apocalyptic novel by English author M. John Harrison, first published in the UK in 2026 by Serpent's Tail. Harrison's 13th novel, it won the 2026 Booker Prize.

The novel develops a storyline that the author first explored in his short story "The Crisis", which was published in 2017 in the Times Literary Supplement and collected in You Should Come with Me Now. "The Crisis" was set in London where alien entities first appeared while The End of Everything starts on the south coast of England where its beachcombing protagonist collects alien artefacts.

The origin and purpose of the aliens is uncertain and the style of the work is mysterious and unsettling. The author wrote the work to portray "the failure of explanation in society" and so eschewed the rational worldbuilding of more conventional works. He wanted it to evoke the New Wave works of science fiction which were serialised in New Worlds – an influential magazine that Harrison worked on from 1968 to 1976.

The End of Everything has been variously described as science fiction, speculative fiction, dystopian and satirical, and as a work of both weird fiction and realism. Harrison has been called a "genre-defying" writer and has stated that he does not believe in genre "in any way".

== Synopsis ==
The setting is South East England in the near future after a crisis has disrupted society. Monstrous and mysterious iGhetti have appeared in the City of London. They are large translucent columns which distort reality, creating "bad patches" of anomalous and unstable environment. Central government seems to have collapsed and Europe is now a "lost continent", but many features of society remain and the main protagonist, Phillip Tennent, makes a living in Dalston-on-Sea by beachcombing for artefacts spawned by the iGhetti which wash up on the shore.

He finds an artefact which develops human characteristics: growing limbs, starting to speak and developing a relationship with Tennent's Aunt Marnie, who is an elderly artist with dementia. The story follows Tennent and his aunt as they both make journeys from the coast to London – Tennent trying to sell the artefact while his aunt is driven from their community after killing a teenager.

== Themes ==
The novel's catastrophe is triggered by the arrival of the unexplained iGhetti: "We know nothing about their actual intentions," says one character. "They may not even know we are here." Their presence can be read as symbolising artificial intelligence, the climate crisis, political chaos, Britain's withdrawal from the European Union, late-stage capitalism or a combination thereof. Placing their focal point in London's financial district was a deliberate choice by the author: the germ of the story was the 2008 financial crisis and the rage it made him feel. Harrison was originally unsatisfied with the name but embraced it after realising the ambiguities it evoked: the explanatory "I get it", the acquisitive "I get", the wealth of the Getty family, the i-products of Apple Inc. and the Freudian ego. In writing the book, he said, his aim was to depict the "explanatory collapse and epistemological collapse that you see in societies that have suddenly lost their grounding".

== Reception ==
Writing in The Guardian, reviewer Michel Faber described it as a "dreamlike and baffling" work that "elucidates humanity's disintegrating existence with strange clarity".

The End of Everything won the 2026 Booker Prize, making Harrison the oldest writer and the first science-fiction author to receive the award. The Booker Prize Foundation described it as a "slyly satirical and unsettling post-apocalyptic adventure into the limits of human understanding", and Dame Mary Beard, chair of the judges' panel, said it was a book "that turns you upside down, raises a wry smile – and surprisingly, given the subject matter, leaves you with a twinge of optimism". Harrison was presented with the trophy and £50,000 prize by 2025 winner David Szalay at a ceremony at Old Billingsgate, London, on 9 November 2026. To satisfy expected demand following the prize, Serpent's Tail printed 148,000 copies including 50,000 hardbacks for the UK market.
