= Switzy =

2026 novel by Emma Cline

- First-edition cover
- Author: Emma Cline
- Publisher: Chatto & Windus
- Publication date: 10 September 2026
- Publication place: London
- Pages: 352
- ISBN: 978-1784746650

Switzy is a 2026 novel by American writer Emma Cline, published in the UK by Chatto & Windus. Well received by critics, it was on the longlist for the 2026 Booker Prize.

== Plot ==
The novel opens with David Hastings flying from the United States to London City Airport, with his assistant Cody. It is told through Hastings' perspective; however, he is severely unwell and suffering from increasing levels of mental impairment, though his exact illness is not stated. A former CFO for an unnamed company, he was dismissed due to memory issues. However, he remains a wealthy man. Unlike many cases of dementia or Alzheimer's disease, Hastings is strongly aware of his mental degradation. He is highly reliant on Cody, an employee-turned-secretary, for navigating the world in his final days, however he is suspicious that Cody is stealing from him.

Hastings has elected to travel to Zurich, Switzerland, in order to undergo voluntary euthanasia. After arriving in London, he visits his daughter Rebecca and her family; they are unaware of his mental degradation, and Hastings does not tell them of his imminent procedure. In France, he also visits a friend from boarding school, Tom. He seeks forgiveness for his participation in homophobic bullying of Tom as a teenager, after the pair had briefly engaged in a relationship. Hastings negatively compares Cody's strong relationship with his boyfriend to his infrequent anonymous sexual encounters. In some of his last thoughts before his death, Hastings thinks of his ex-wife, Annabel.

== Style and themes ==
The novel focuses largely on the mental degradation of an old man, and the nature of death. Described as a modernist novel, the fractiousness of Hastings' mind is reflected through large areas of white space separating small paragraphs.

== Reception ==
The novel received largely positive reviews from critics; Vulture's Emma Alpern named it Cline's best novel yet. Multiple reviews praised Cline's depiction of Hastings' mental condition, and of imminent death. The emotional nature of the novel's end received specific praise. The Guardian's Chris Power, described how the combination of "horror, beauty, absurdity, and...sense of profound finality" turned the last 50 pages into the novel's "best self". Cline was also praised for her style and structure of her writing, and the way it creates emotion, by The Observer's Olivia Ovenden.

However, The New York Times' Alexandra Jacobs offered some criticism, questioning if Hastings' mental degradation was medically possible, and his rejection of things usually valued by the dying. Power was also critical of the narrative, which he labelled a "traditional trauma-plot novel".
