= The Things We Never Say =

2026 novel by Elizabeth Strout

- Author: Elizabeth Strout
- Language: English
- Genre: Literary fiction
- Publisher: Random House
- Publication date: May 5, 2026
- Media type: Print (hardcover), audiobook
- Pages: 224 (hardcover)
- ISBN: 9798217154746
- Preceded by: Tell Me Everything

The Things We Never Say is a 2026 novel by American author Elizabeth Strout. It marks a departure from the interconnected settings and recurring characters of her previous works, instead introducing a new protagonist in a standalone narrative. The novel was published on May 5, 2026, by Random House.

== Plot ==
The novel is set in an unnamed coastal town in Massachusetts during the summer and autumn of 2024, leading up to the United States presidential election. Artie Dam, a 57-year-old high school history teacher who is well-liked by his students and colleagues, struggles with feelings of isolation and disconnection from those around him. Artie has been secretly contemplating suicide. Ten years earlier, his son, Rob, was driving a car that crashed, killing his girlfriend; Rob survived but has become withdrawn. Artie feels estranged from his wife, Evie, and senses a growing emotional distance between them. He also feels increasingly alienated by the political climate, which he finds ominous and confusing.

Artie nearly drowns after slipping while stepping from his dinghy into his sailboat. He is rescued, and the near-death experience temporarily renews his desire to live. Later, Rob reveals a secret about Evie that forces Artie to reassess his understanding of his marriage and family. As the presidential election results come in, Artie, dismayed by the outcome, experiences a deeper unraveling.

== Background ==
Strout has described the idea for the character of Artie Dam originated when a friend sent her a page of obituaries. She noticed a photograph of a man with wire-rimmed glasses and an ordinary face, which she found intriguing. She later combined this image with the memory of a story she had overheard about a man found floating in the water off the Massachusetts coast, which she kept thinking about. To research the setting, Strout and her husband drove along the Massachusetts coast for several days to gather visual details, noting elements such as large old houses built close to the sidewalk, which differed from what she had observed in Maine. The novel was written using a scene-based approach, a technique Strout developed while teaching at Manhattan Community College for 13 years, where she had limited time to write. She described the book as a “standalone” and said that stepping away from the interconnected Maine-based world of her previous characters to create a new cast in Massachusetts felt "refreshing".

== Themes ==
The novel explores themes of male loneliness, the difficulty of authentic communication, and the corrosive nature of secrets. Its epigraph, a quotation from Carl Jung—“Loneliness does not come from having no people about one, but from being unable to communicate the things that seem important to oneself, or from holding certain views which others find inadmissible”—establishes the novel’s central concerns. Critics have noted that the book is also explicitly political, engaging with the 2024 election, its aftermath, and related social issues such as politically correct pedagogy and immigration enforcement. Artie’s internal crisis is framed in part by the external political turmoil of the period, and the novel has been described as a “state-of-the-nation examination”.

== Publication ==
The Things We Never Say was published by Random House on May 5, 2026. The first edition is 203 pages long. The hardcover edition has 224 pages. The audiobook, narrated by Robert Petkoff, is approximately 6 hours and 35 minutes in length.

== Reception ==
Several reviewers praised Strout’s ability to create a new and compelling fictional world. The Guardian described the novel as featuring a “fresh cast of characters” and said “readers will delight in the discovery of this new fictional world”. The Financial Times called the protagonist “someone you may never be able to forget.” Kirkus Reviews described the book as “one of Strout’s most profound novels yet.” The Boston Globe called it "by far her bleakest book" and "her most unabashedly political book", but also questioned whether the novel's darkness and overt political references made it "one of Strout's less successful works of fiction", noting that some plot twists felt "both predictable and exaggerated".

The Things We Never Say is one of 13 books longlisted for the 2026 Booker Prize.
