= Rebecca Perry =

British writer (born 1986)

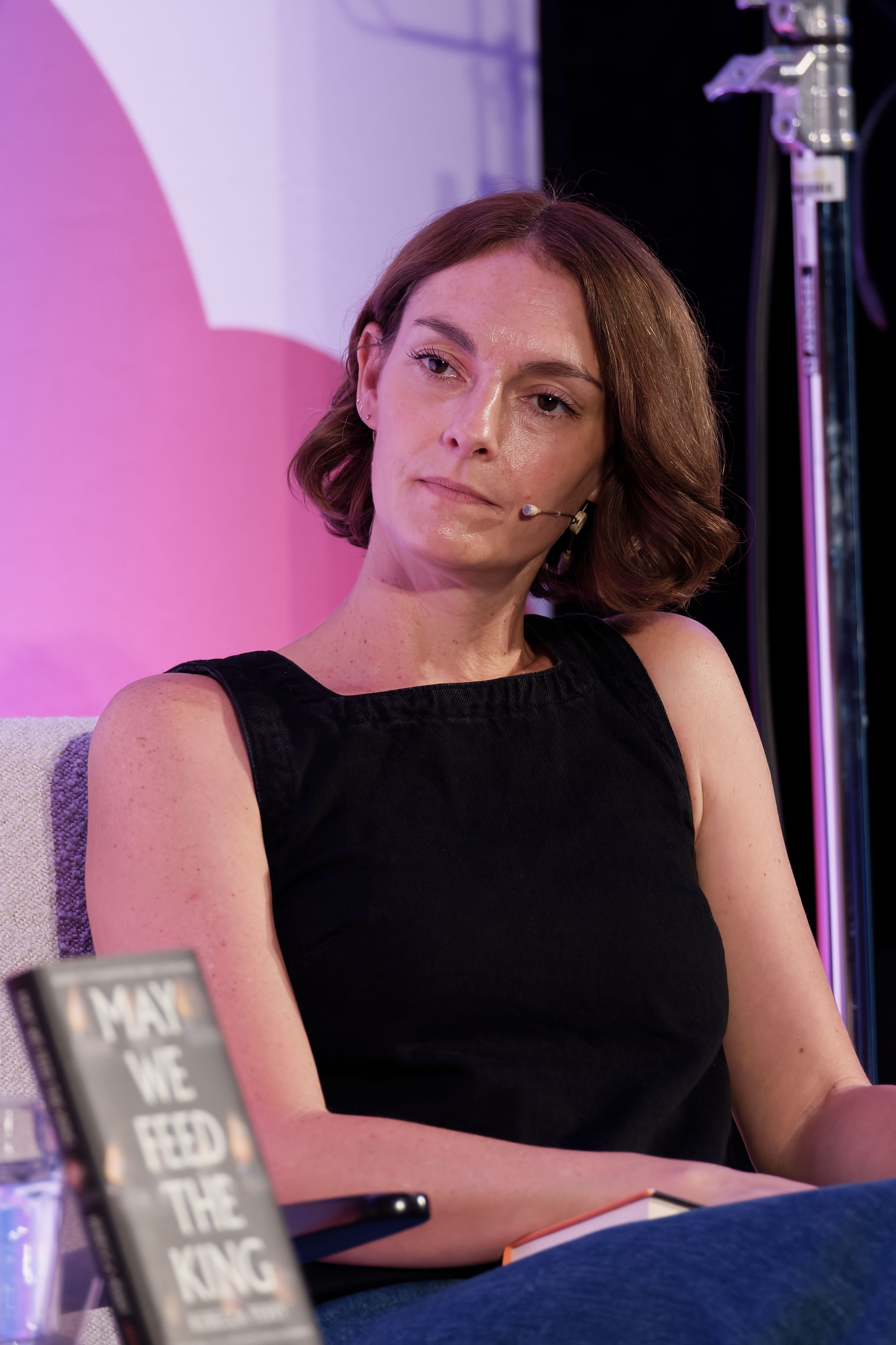
- Perry in 2026
- Born: 1986 (age 39–40)
- Education: University of Manchester (MA)
- Years active: 2011–present

Rebecca Perry (born 1986) is an English poet and novelist. She began her career writing poetry. Her debut novel May We Feed the King (2026) won the Waterstones Debut Fiction Prize and was shortlisted for the 2026 Booker Prize.

== Early life ==
Perry is from Croydon, South London. She completed a Master of Arts (MA) in Creative Writing at the Manchester Centre for New Writing in 2008.

== Career ==
Perry's debut poetry pamphlet Little Armoured won the 2011 Poetry Wales Purple Moose Poetry Prize. It was published via Seren Books.

In autumn 2014, Perry joined as a co-editor of Poems in Which.

Via Bloodaxe Books, Perry's debut poetry collection Beauty / Beauty was published in 2015. Beauty / Beauty won the Michael Murphy Memorial Poetry Prize and was shortlisted for the T. S. Eliot Prize, The Poetry Society's Fenton Aldeburgh First Collection Prize, and the Seamus Heaney Centre Prize for First Collection.

In spring 2016, Perry returned to the Manchester Centre for New Writing as a Poetry Fellow and one of two Writers in Residence alongside Emma Jane Unsworth. Perry's next pamphlets were Cleanliness of Rooms and Walls in 2017 followed by Insect & Lilac with Amy Key and Beaches in 2019.

Perry's second poetry collection Stone Fruit was published in 2021. Stone Fruit was the Poetry Book Society's summer recommendation. This was followed by her debut non-fiction work On Trampolining, published in 2023 via Makina Books.

In 2025, Granta Books acquired the rights to publish Perry's debut historical novel May We Feed the King in 2026. The novel consists of dual timelines following a medieval king and a modern day curator respectively. May We Feed the King won the Waterstones Debut Fiction Prize and was one of six novels shortlisted for the 2026 Booker Prize. Perry was named one of the 10 best debut novelists of 2026 by The Observer.

== Bibliography ==
=== Novels ===
- May We Feed the King (2026)

=== Non-fiction ===
- On Trampolining (2023)

=== Poetry collections ===
- Beauty / Beauty (2015)
- Stone Fruit (2021)

=== Pamphlets ===
- little armoured (2011)
- cleanliness of rooms and walls (2017)
- insect & lilac (2019) with Amy Key
- Beaches (2019)

=== Contributions ===
- in Best Friends Forever: Poems About Female Friendship (2014), edited by Amy Key

== Accolades ==
Year	Award	Category	Title	Result	Ref.
2011	Poetry Wales	Purple Moose Poetry Prize	little armoured	Won	
2015	Fenton Aldeburgh First Collection Prize		Beauty / Beauty	Shortlisted	
2016	T. S. Eliot Prize		Beauty / Beauty	Shortlisted	
2016	Seamus Heaney Centre	Prize for First Collection	Beauty / Beauty	Shortlisted	
2017	Michael Murphy Memorial Poetry Prize		Beauty / Beauty	Won	
2026	Waterstones Debut Fiction Prize		May We Feed the King	Won	
2026	Booker Prize		May We Feed the King	Shortlisted	
