= Rebecca Liu =

Culture commentator and critic

Rebecca Liu is an arts critic, commentator and writer based in the United Kingdom. Her writings usually cover film and literature.

Liu is a contributor and editor at The Guardian's Saturday magazine. Saturday is a weekly magazine supplement to The Guardian newspaper featuring articles about film, books, lifestyle and travel, and interviews with prominent people from the arts. Liu's other writings have appeared in The Guardian's sister paper The Observer, The Financial Times, New Statesman, The Times Literary Supplement, the feminist film magazine Another Gaze, The Nation and the academic literary journal Critical Quarterly. She contributed an essay discussing John Berger's 1972 novel G. to a 2023 special edition of the journal Critical Quarterly, with the special edition consisting entirely of articles discussing John Berger and his works.

Liu is a judge for the 2026 Booker Prize literary award. As a Booker Prize judge, she had to read more than 100 books in 7 months while deliberating with the other judges on the panel to compile the longlist. In an interview with the The Booker Prizes, Liu stated that while deliberating with the other judges, disagreements helped her see specific books from a new perspective, stating that disagreement can be "generous, generative, and fun." While reading the books she did not always have the luxury of long, quiet, uninterrupted time. She would often read throghout her day and around her work schedule; while waiting for the bus, waiting in line, or taking a long bus ride across town to visit a friend. She brought a book to the Arsenal FC championship parade but was unable to get any reading done. Liu stated that with incorporating more reading throughout her days her life was changed, stating: "...a whole world opens up to you when you leave your phone in a cupboard."

Liu previously worked as an assistant editor for Prospect magazine and hosted a podcast for the magazine.

Liu was born in Wuhan, China and raised in Hong Kong, China and Auckland, New Zealand. She studied history and East Asian studies at the University of Chicago and political thought and intellectual history at Cambridge University.
