= May We Feed the King =

2026 novel by Rebecca Perry

- Author: Rebecca Perry
- Publisher: Granta
- Publication place: London
- English publication date: 29 January 2026
- Pages: 272
- ISBN: 9781803513867
- Website: Granta

May We Feed the King is the first novel by English poet and novelist Rebecca Perry. Published by Granta in 2026, it won the Waterstones Debut Fiction Prize that year and was one of six novels chosen for the 2026 Booker Prize shortlist.

== Plot ==
The story consists of dual timelines: one following an obscure and somewhat reluctant medieval king, and the other focused on the modern-day curator charged with preparing some of his rooms – in particular, the tables at which he dined – for public display.

== Reception ==
Reviewing May We Feed the King in The Guardian, Melissa Harrison described it as an ingenious novel that "deliberately wrongfoots the reader at every turn". Olivia Ovenden in The Observer called the book's style "lyrical and rich" and noted that it raised important questions about how far historical texts and records can be trusted.

The novel won the Waterstones Debut Fiction Prize in the year of its publication, when it was praised for "its crisp, cool prose, and its playfully enigmatic approach to storytelling". It was also one of six books shortlisted for the 2026 Booker Prize.
