= The Shadow of the Object =

2026 novel by Chloe Aridjis

- Author: Chloe Aridjis
- Set in: Mexico City and London
- Publisher: Chatto & Windus
- Publication place: London
- English publication date: 16 April 2026
- Pages: 192
- ISBN: 9781784746377
- Website: Chatto & Windus

The Shadow of the Object is a 2026 novel by Mexican-British writer Chloe Aridjis, published in the UK by Chatto & Windus. It was longlisted for the 2026 Booker Prize.

== Plot ==
While visiting relatives in Mexico City, Flora is attacked by the family dog. During her ensuing hospitalisation she meets Wilhelmina, an elderly German collector of pre-cinema toys and artefacts, who charms her with a magic-lantern show. Back in London, she contacts Wilhelmina's son, Max, with whom she develops a relationship.

== Reception ==
Writing in The Guardian, reviewer A. K. Blakemore described it as a "glowing, mythopoeic book" and said that even without its profound themes, it would be "an immense achievement based on the strange, impressionistic beauty of its prose alone".
