= Makenna Goodman =

American editor and author

Makenna Goodman (born c. 1985) is an American editor and author.

== Early life and career ==
Goodman grew up in Colorado. After studying at Wesleyan University, she lived in New York, where she wrote for art magazines and reviewed films before getting a job as an editorial assistant at a Big Five publisher. After working in that position for a year, she worked for a literary agent for less than a year before being fired. She subsequently moved to Vermont in 2008 because she disliked the field of corporate publishing and wanted to be a writer.

After arriving in Vermont, Goodman intended to work at a diner but reached out to a small press in the area even though there were no job openings available. The press hired her, and she worked as an editor at the radical and mission-based organization for 11 years. Much of her work at the publisher was centered around books about agriculture and Integrative Health, which paralleled her efforts to grow her own food at home.

Goodman is married and has multiple children. As of September 2020, she lived in Vershire, Vermont.

== The Shame ==
Goodman's debut novel is titled The Shame. She wrote it in secret, only telling her husband Sam and her agent about it after completing the first draft, which she wrote around 2015 after reading a book about psychoanalytic theory; she was particularly inspired by the book's analysis of Eros and Psyche. The book's title was suggested by Goodman's friend Sheila Heti. It was published by Milkweed Editions.

== Helen of Nowhere ==
Helen of Nowhere is Goodman's second novel. It was first published in the United States by Coffee House Press on September 9, 2025, and in the United Kingdom by Fitzcarraldo Editions on 29 January 2026. The novel follows an unnamed, recently disgraced English professor who visits a rural house for sale. Over the course of the viewing he is drawn into a series of monologues and shifting perspectives involving the realtor and the lingering presence of the property's former owner, Helen.

In The Guardian, Jo Hamya described the book as an incisive, satirical fable that interrogates neo-transcendentalism, misogyny, and questions of power through a series of narratorial shifts. Publishers Weekly noted Goodman's formal experimentation – likening the work's structure to theatrical dialogue – and characterized the novel as a feminist refashioning that delivers moments of comeuppance for its narrator. Johanna Thomas-Corr also noted the novel's dramatic structure, likening it to "a six-act play composed of monologues that are unpredictable and funny."

An excerpt from the novel was published by Literary Hub as "Daily Fiction", presented with permission of Coffee House Press. In July 2026, the novel was longlisted for The Booker Prize.
