= Kylemore College =

Coordinates: 53.3450°N 6.3514°W

Information
- School type: Secondary school
- Established: 1965; 60 years ago
- Principal: Ms. Deirdre Nolan
- Gender: Mixed
- Website: www.kylemorecollege.ie

Kylemore College is a secondary school in Ballyfermot, Dublin, Ireland. It is a gender mixed school and is a CDETB school. It also offers PLC courses.

Kylemore College was established in 1965 by the City of Dublin Vocational Education Committee (CDVEC) as a vocational school. Over the years, Kylemore College has changed and developed into a co-educational college.
