= 2025 Booker Prize =

British literary award given in 2025

- Date: 10 November 2025
- Location: Old Billingsgate, London
- Country: United Kingdom & Ireland
- Website: https://thebookerprizes.com/the-booker-library/prize-years/2025

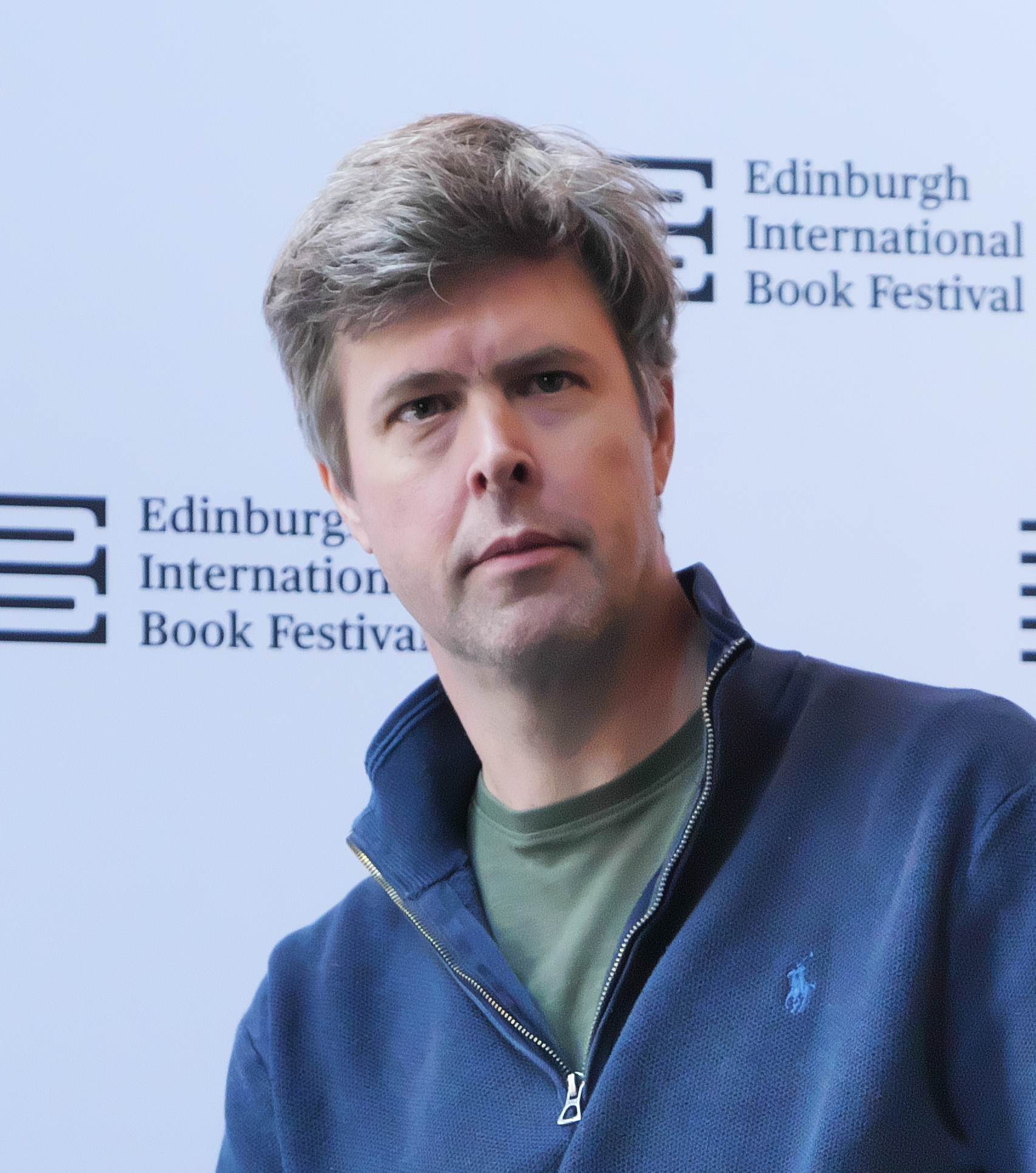
David Szalay, winner of the 2025 Booker Prize

The 2025 Booker Prize is a literary award worth £50,000 given for the best English-language novel published between 1 October 2024 and 30 September 2025 in either the United Kingdom or Ireland.

The longlist of 13 titles was announced on 29 July 2025. The shortlist of six finalists was announced on 23 September 2025. Regarding the shortlisted works, the chair of the judging panel, Roddy Doyle, stated that all six novels shared two things in common: they were unique in that they could only have been written by their respective authors and the authors who did write them displayed a mastery of the English language in the narrative. Doyle further stated that all of the works were "brillianty human", displaying the characters and their relationships to others as the centrepiece of the works.

On 10 November 2025, at a ceremony in the Old Billingsgate in London, the prize was awarded to Flesh by David Szalay. Roddy Doyle stated: “The book we kept coming back to, the one that stood out from the other great novels, was Flesh — because of its singularity.” In his acceptance speech, Szalay stated that artistically, he took on risks when writing the unconventional novel. He stated that his work "embraces that sense of risk rather than shuns it". With the win, Szalay became the first British-Hungarian author to be awarded the Booker Prize (Hungarian author Laszlo Krasznahorkai was awarded an International Booker Prize in 2015). This was Szalay's second nomination, after his 2016 novel All That Man Is was shortlisted for the prize.

== Judging panel ==
- Roddy Doyle (chair)
- Ayọ̀bámi Adébáyọ̀
- Chris Power
- Kiley Reid
- Sarah Jessica Parker

== Nominees ==
All 2025 nominees are novels.

indicates the winner
indicates shortlisted

| Author | Title | Country | Publisher |
|---|---|---|---|
| Claire Adam | Love Forms | Trinidad & Tobago | Faber |
| Tash Aw | The South | Malaysia | 4th Estate |
| Natasha Brown | Universality | UK | Faber |
| Jonathan Buckley | One Boat | UK | Fitzcarraldo Editions |
| Susan Choi | Flashlight | USA | Jonathan Cape |
| Kiran Desai | The Loneliness of Sonia and Sunny | India | Hamish Hamilton |
| Katie Kitamura | Audition | USA | Fern Press |
| Ben Markovits | The Rest of Our Lives | UK/USA | Faber |
| Andrew Miller | The Land in Winter | UK | Sceptre |
| Maria Reva | Endling | Canada/Ukraine | Virago/Little, Brown |
| David Szalay | Flesh | Hungary/UK | Jonathan Cape |
| Benjamin Wood | Seascraper | UK | Viking |
| Ledia Xhoga | Misinterpretation | Albania/USA | Daunt Books Originals |

== See also ==
- List of winners and nominated authors of the Booker Prize
