= Flesh (Szalay novel) =

2025 novel by David Szalay

- 2025 book jacket by Scribner
- Author: David Szalay
- Audio read by: Daniel Weyman
- Subject: Fictional alienation, adultery, trauma, interpersonal relations, young men
- Genre: Rags to riches, Coming of age, Literary realism
- Set in: Hungary and London, England
- Published: March 2025
- Publisher: Jonathan Cape, Scribner
- Publication place: United Kingdom, United States
- Media type: Print, E-book, Audio
- Pages: 349
- ISBN: 9780224099783 (Cape); 9781982122799 (Scribner)
- OCLC: 1438665214
- Website: Official website

Flesh, published in 2025, is the sixth novel by Canadian-Hungarian David Szalay. It tells a rags-to-riches story about a Hungarian man named István. He lives impulsively, making decisions without thinking them through. After his sexual awakening, juvenile detention, military service, and a series of menial jobs, István becomes a rich married socialite in London. This brings him some contentment, but his personality generates conflict with his new family.

Some critics praised the novel's lean prose, compelling story and taciturn protagonist. Others disliked the book's omission of many important events in István's life and its sparse dialogue. The work won the 2025 Booker Prize. The chair of the judging panel, Roddy Doyle, called the book "singular" in its narrative style and said its sparseness invites the reader to engage with the character.

== Plot ==
This book opens with the protagonist, István, as a shy and awkward adolescent living on a Hungarian housing estate. The story follows his rise from poverty to married life amongst Europe's top-one-percent earners and economic descent afterwards. His life takes many turns in between. István is a virginal 15-year-old when he has a sexual relationship with a married 42-year-old woman. He gets into a fight with her husband and is blamed for his death, leading to juvenile detention and soldiering during the Iraq War. From these experiences he learns resilience.

Later, István works in private security and becomes a chauffeur for a well-to-do London family. He becomes part of their life, including their moneyed lifestyle, designer clothes, private jets, and exclusive restaurants. He has an affair with the wife, during which the husband dies of natural causes. István marries the widow. His stepson despises him.

=== Protagonist ===
István remains "coarse, inarticulate and boorish" despite his elevation to the world of the super-rich. The Associated Press called him "still stuck somewhat as a teenager, unable to completely interact with others on an adult level", adding, "It appears as though physical relationships are the only time he can truly connect with other adults". He retains a "disfiguring urge for violence" and feels like a "passive participant in the events of his life" who is "hobbled largely beyond help by its traumas".

István usually acts on instinct first and reflects on his actions later: "His body knows things his mind doesn't. The people around him know things about him that he doesn't know about himself." Szalay has said he wanted the novel to "express the feeling I had that our existence is a physical experience before it is anything else, that all of its other aspects proceed from that physicality".

István's inclination to follow his instincts rather than thinking things through is reflected in his speech patterns. He tends to reply to other people rather than initiating conversation, and he heavily uses banal phrases such as "yeah" or "I don't know". In the words of one reviewer, this leads to "almost comically minimalist" dialogue in which "István conducts entire conversations saying little except 'Okay'." Reviewers observed that István develops more empathy over time, enabling him to develop more lasting human connections.

== Publication history ==
Flesh was published on 6 March 2025 by Jonathan Cape in the United Kingdom and on 1 April 2025 by Scribner in the United States.

== Critical reception ==
The novel's critical reception was generally favorable and it won the 2025 Booker Prize. Roddy Doyle, the chair of the judging panel, said the judges "had never read anything quite like it. It is, in many ways, a dark book but it is a joy to read." Fellow judge Sarah Jessica Parker called Flesh "hypnotically tense and compelling" and "an astonishingly moving portrait of a man's life". The Associated Press wrote, "Szalay's straightforward, spare prose helps propel the novel as the effects of that tragedy reverberate throughout his life ... The power of Flesh is Szalay's ability to let these moments speak for themselves, letting these simple interactions tell a tragic story." The Boston Globe called the book a "gentle yet deeply affecting novel about a taciturn man who overcomes abuse and loss early in life to stumble into transitory contentment—if not quite true happiness."

On the Seawall called Flesh "a shrewd novel that leverages the unsaid to speak volumes". The Wall Street Journal wrote that the scarcity of inner dialogue and character descriptions gives the book a hypnotic effect. Singer Dua Lipa selected the novel for her monthly book club, writing, "In Flesh, David pares speech back to the bone", and "despite these spare details, I found Flesh a tense and gripping read—and by the end, I cared deeply about István." The Sunday Times wrote, "Flesh is a revelatory novel that will make you look afresh at every eastern European doorman or bouncer you encounter."

In The New York Times, Dwight Garner called the book a "cool, remote novel" about "male alienation: Even as the hero advances toward the redoubts of privilege, he feels like a bystander to his own life, with the detachment of a survivor." Garner concluded: "I admired this book from front to back without ever quite liking it, without ever quite giving in to it." Other reviews were less favorable. Cal Revely-Calder, the literary editor of The Daily Telegraph, lamented that contemporary fiction editors lack rigor and fail to challenge authors to their full potential, calling Flesh "half the novel it could have been" and writing that other nominees—such as Kiran Desai's The Loneliness of Sonia and Sunny and Andrew Miller's The Land in Winter—were more engrossing and worthier of the prize.

== Film adaptation ==
In November 2025, film rights were optioned by House Productions, BBC Film and Access Entertainment.

== See also ==
- The Luck of Barry Lyndon, a novel about a similar character
