= Endling (disambiguation) =

An endling is the last known individual of a species or subspecies.

Endling or Endlings may also refer to:

- Endling (album), by Kvelertak in 2023
- Endling (2023 novel), novel by Jasmin Schreiber
- Endling (2025 novel), novel by Maria Reva
- Endlings (TV series)
- Endling: Extinction is Forever, a video game
- Endling, a book series by Katherine Applegate
- Endlings, a play by Celine Song
- Endlings, a 2015 album by The Well Pennies
