= Love Forms =

2025 novel by Claire Adam

- Author: Claire Adam
- Language: English
- Publisher: Faber
- Publication date: 2025
- Publication place: England
- Pages: 320
- Awards: Booker Prize (longlist)
- ISBN: 9780861546459

Love Forms is a 2025 novel by author Claire Adam which tells the story of Dawn, an emigrant from Trinidad and Tobago who lives in present-day London and is trying to find her lost daughter whom she was forced to give up for adoption in 1980. Dawn was 16 years old at the time, and her family had forced her to give up her daughter for adoption after an unintended pregnancy.

The novel was longlisted for the 2025 Booker Prize, with the judging panel praising Adam's exploration of the main character Dawn, stating: "Dawn's voice haunts us still, with its beautiful and quiet urgency".

== Narrative ==
Sixteen-year-old Dawn Bishops becomes pregnant after a one-night stand with a foreign tourist during Carnival in 1980. Born to an affluent and influential family in Trinidad and Tobago, her parents are humiliated and disappointed with this unexpected pregnancy. Her parents arrange for Dawn to travel to a convent in Venezuela where Dawn gives birth to a baby girl while under the care of nuns. She then gives the baby girl to the nuns who place her up for adoption, and Dawn travels back to Trinidad. Her parents encourage Dawn to suppress the entire event and it is rarely ever discussed.

Forty years later, living in London, Dawn is now 58, recently divorced and with two adult sons. She long retired as a general practitioner and now works as a receptionist for an estate agent, a career choice she made so she can devote more time to raising her boys. At this stage of her life, Dawn feels emptiness and a longing to reconnect with her lost daughter. She begins the search, speaking to others on online adoption groups. Dawn is then contacted by Monica, a 42-year-old woman from Italy, adopted in Venezuela, who believes she is Dawn's daughter.

== Reception ==
The novel was generally well received by critics. Writing for The Sunday Times, and also alluding to Adam's debut novel Golden Child, Johanna Thomas-Corr stated: "Adam's defining skill is to produce heartbreaking family stories that don't resort to mawkishness". Writing for The Financial Times, John Self commended Adam's for featuring Dawn's inner motivations and feelings, features of character development, in the narrative rather than overly focusing on driving the plot. Self stated that the novel was a "rich expression of all the elements that make up a life" rather than the author "pursuing the surface story at full speed". Writing for The Guardian, Julie Myerson stated that Adam was able to gracefully depict how a character's feelings and motivations can morph over time. Myerson also said that the novel featured dialogue with a subtext that complimented the characters' relationships and the plot.
