= Audition (Kitamura novel) =

2025 novel by Katie Kitamura

- Author: Katie Kitamura
- Language: English
- Genre: Literary fiction
- Publisher: Riverhead Books
- Publication date: April 8, 2025
- Pages: 208
- ISBN: 978-0593852323

Audition is the fifth novel by American writer Katie Kitamura, published by Riverhead Books on April 8, 2025. The novel was shortlisted for the 2025 Booker Prize. It was a finalist for the 2026 Pulitzer Prize for Fiction.

== Synopsis ==
Set in New York City, the novel follows an actress who is in rehearsals for a play called The Opposite Shore. The opening pages describe her meeting a younger man named Xavier at a restaurant for lunch. Xavier tells the narrator that he is her son, but she believes this to be impossible.

== Background ==
Kitamura came upon the idea for the novel in the 2010s, when she read the following headline: "A stranger told me he was my son." She was careful not to read the article that accompanied it, because she was "interested in the illogical nature of the headline. The two terms, 'a stranger' and 'my son', seemed diametrically opposed, even mutually exclusive. I didn't want the mystery of that opposition to be resolved." The intriguing headline lingered in her mind, and after her novel Intimacies was published in 2021, she began to write the book that would become Audition.

Kitamura considers Audition to be "in conversation" with her two previous novels, Intimacies and A Separation, because like them it has an unnamed female protagonist and centres around themes of "interpretation, language, and performance."

Audition appeared on lists of highly anticipated novels set for publication in 2025 published by Time, The Guardian, and other outlets.

== Film Adaptation ==
In September 10, 2025, Laika Studios and Higher Ground Productions are set to project a live-action adaptation of the novel with director Lulu Wang who's co-producing and co-writing with Martyna Majok.

== Critical reception ==
In a starred review, Kirkus Reviews concluded that "[in] this searing, chilly, and psychologically profound story lies insight into some harrowing human questions." Publishers Weekly also gave the novel a starred review, noting that Kitamura "succeeds in creating a complex and engrossing portrayal of her characters’ blurry boundaries. Readers won’t be able to put this down."

Vogue said that Kitamura "writes with a spare, almost clinical efficiency, but that doesn’t limit the depth of her characters or the complexity of the dynamics she depicts." They concluded that "[the] strange pendulum swing from one scenario to the other catches you off guard—and isn’t that the mark of truly exciting fiction?"

Author Lauren Groff described the novel as "eerie, a book so cold it feels hot". The Guardian called it "unnerving" and "a literary performance of true uncanniness."

The novel was included on former president Barack Obama's 2025 summer reading list, and was shortlisted for the 2025 Booker Prize. Publishers Weekly named it one of the top ten best books of 2025, regardless of genre.

It was a finalist for the 2025 National Book Critics Circle Award and longlisted for the 2026 Carol Shields Prize for Fiction.
