= Anna Farquhar =

American author and editor

Anna Farquhar Bergengren
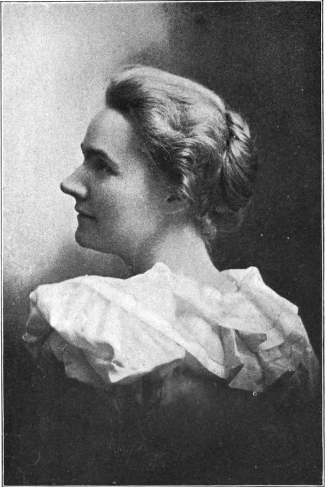
- Photo in Famous authors, 1901
- Born: Anna Farquhar; December 23, 1865; Brookville, Indiana, U.S.
- Died: 1945 (aged 79–80); Scituate, Massachusetts, U.S.
- Resting place: Oak Grove Cemetery
- Occupations: author; editor
- Spouse: Ralph Wilhelm Bergengren (m. 1900)
- Writing career
- Pen name: Margaret Allston
- Language: English
- Genres: fiction; non-fiction
- Notable work: Her Washington Experiences

Anna Farquhar (after marriage, Anna Bergengren; pen name, Margaret Allston; December 23, 1865 – 1945) was an American author and editor from Indiana. She initially planned a career as a professional singer, studying in Boston, London, and Paris, but health issues ended her musical pursuits. Farquhar wrote for several newspapers, including the Boston Transcript, Detroit Free Press, and Springfield Republican, and served as assistant editor of National Magazine. Her early literary work, A Singer's Heart (1897), reflected her artistic ambitions, and The Professor's Daughter appeared in the Saturday Evening Post. Her Boston Experiences was first published in magazine form and then as a book in 1899. She later adopted the pseudonym “Margaret Allston” for her writings, which included The Devil's Plough (1901), a historical novel about early French missionaries in North America, as well as Her Washington Experiences: As Related by a Cabinet Minister's Wife and Letters of a Cabinet Member's Wife (1897).

== Early life and education ==
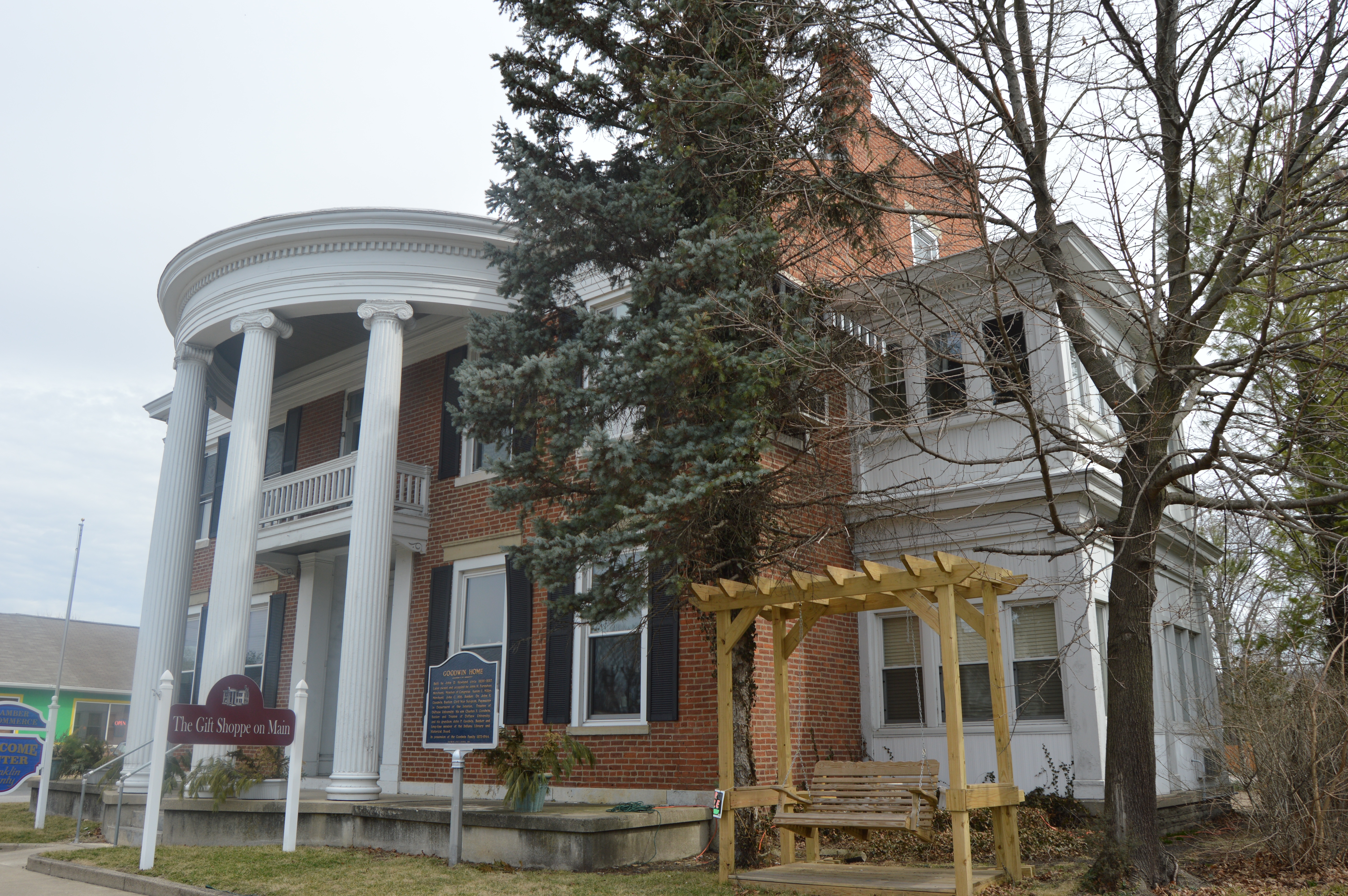
Farquhar family home in Brookville

Anna Farquhar was born on December 23, 1865, in Brookville, Indiana. Her father, John Hanson Farquhar, was a lawyer and congressman. Her mother was Frances Mary Farquhar. Anna's Scotch-English ancestors came to the United States in the 1630s, settling in Maryland, near Baltimore. After a short residence in Cincinnati, Ohio, her family moved to Indianapolis, where Congressman Farquhar became president of one of the foremost city banks.

In Indianapolis, Anna attended private schools, showing a distinct inclination toward languages and history, and an overwhelming love for music. Mathematics was her weakest subject. At sixteen, she attended a boarding-school in Maryland, but soon returned to a society life, "educating her heels far better than her head will ever be educated."

In 1886, when she was 21, Farquhar left Indianapolis for Boston to study music professionally. The family property was mortgaged in order to raise the money for her musical education, facilitated by the death of her father a few years prior. While in Boston, Farquhar worked to cultivate her voice for grand opera, sang in church, and taught singing at the same time. While Farquhar struggled to cultivate her voice, she did receive recognition of her growing musical powers by appointment to a position in a church choir. However, the weather in New England began to undermine her health, which was never very robust, and her throat was so affected that she could not continue voice lessons.

== Career ==
Farquhar moved to Maryland, then New York City and Washington D.C. in search of conditions that would improve her health enough for her to have a singing career. It was then that she first applied herself to literary work, finding an outlet for artistic expression. The next years were a period of sickness and renewed literary endeavor.

As a singing teacher, she kept in touch with music, and, under the skillful treatment of a New York physician, her lost voice gradually returned, although still unstable. A visit to England shortly after a brief residence in Boston, where she had held an editorship on a periodical devoted to music, decided her future career. The years of training to be a professional musician came to an end, as far as permanent results were concerned, for, said London's foremost teacher of music, "Your physique and temperament can never stand the strain of the musical life."

A Singer's Heart, published in Boston in 1897, was Farquhar's first literary endeavor, and to some extent expressed the professional ambitions which she herself had experienced in her musical career. Although it was not a popular production, its notices were flattering, and when a Philadelphia paper bought twelve copies for its editorial staff, her spirits were raised and stimulated to renew her literary work.

"The Inner Experiences of a Cabinet Officer's Wife," written based on Furquhar's experiences while living in the Capital, was a picture of the complexity of the political and social workings of those who worked in the government, which the outsider would have been astonished to meet with at the United States Capitol. "The Inner Experiences of a Cabinet Officer's Wife" was a story that found itself upon an unusual number of library tables in its days. A host of personal letters showed that some comments had struck some nerves, but the story swung gracefully on, through threatened libel suits and denunciations of every description. "There was not a single specific and living character in city life that was intentionally put down," she says, "with perhaps one exception, and that was of a woman, and by her permission."

"The Professor's Daughter" first appeared in the Saturday Evening Post, when it had its great expansion. It was the story of simple people in a Rhode Island country neighborhood, whose characteristics Farquhar well knew, for among them she had lived a quiet, studious life for many summers. It contained that human element that made it very popular.

When still a comparatively unknown writer, Farquhar, using the pen name "Margaret Allston", introduced herself to the readers of the Ladies' Home Journal in a series of chapters called "Her Boston Experiences", with:—"I was twenty-two years old when first went to Boston to visit the family of my father's eldest brother, Mr. John Allston, who at an early age there settled into business prosperity." "Her Boston Experiences" was satirical in nature, frank, and provided a multi-faceted view of Boston life. "Her Boston Experiences" ran through many editions in book form. As a New Englander said:— "Any good Bostonian who doesn't mind a bit of satire at his own expense may send this description of his beloved city to strangers and foreigners with the serene conviction that they will thus gain a better idea of the place and society than any number of guide-books could afford." Reputedly, these chapters stopped at least one sale of real estate due to a satirization of a part of Boston in which the reputation was morally questionable and it is said that a Cambridge professor has permanently annexed it to his lectures, to be read to the students as an antidote for some of his dryest hours. But this was not art of the highest type, and a woman who had studied the lives of Carlyle, Huxley, Darwin, Spencer, and other great thinkers of the middle nineteenth century, in order to imbibe their spirit of work and energy, was naturally desirous of accomplishing something of greater and more lasting artistic excellence.

As a result of a sympathetic acquaintance with the territory occupied by the French Jesuits at the earliest period of their missionary efforts in North America, and also with Mr. Parkman's history of their vigorous lives, Farquhar received a vivid impression of the romantic possibilities of that period. This led to a rapid development of the romantic complications surrounding the hero of The Devil's Plough, but the study of the French characteristics and habits of the seventeenth century required the painstaking investigation of several months before the plot could be expanded into a book. The material once at her command, the writing took a short time. When the book had been completed, she was temporarily exhausted; too much dramatic force had been expended in the preparation. As a play, in fact, it was first conceived, and that is why it found such immediate favor with the dramatic profession when it appeared in book form. The story was of a struggle between pure ideals and the baser emotions, in which the higher impulse eventually triumphs. It is not strange then that her feelings were similar to that of a great — perhaps the greatest — American sculptor, who, after completing a statue of marvelous spirit and expression, was forced to retire to the quiet of a country life for full six months.

== Personal life ==
On January 26, 1900, she married Ralph Wilhelm Bergengren (1871–1947), a Boston journalist, essayist, humorist, critic, and children's poet. The marriage took place at the side of her sick bed, with only two or three witnesses present. Thereafter, she continued her literary career.

== Writing method ==
Farquhar's literary method was to "walk miles and miles when a story comes to me, and when my story-people begin to talk, I sit and stitch on some hand sewing (when a man would smoke) until everything is ready to go down, then it goes like an explosion of ideas, so to speak, followed by careful modelling and severe, searching criticism." With an individual who was so eager in the endeavor to perfect her art, it was indeed to be expected that the masterpiece would come, although, in her own words, she stated that, "I cannot say that I have a conquest of the world in view; my ambition always is simply to do my best."

== Selected works ==
=== As Anna Farquhar ===
- A Singer's Heart, 1897
- Letters of a Cabinet Member's Wife, 1897
- The Professor's Daughter, 1899
- The Devil's Plough: the romantic history of a soul conflict, 1901

=== As Margaret Allston ===
- Her Boston Experiences; a picture of modern Boston society and people, 1900
