= The Inheritance of Loss =

2006 book by Kiran Desai

- First US edition
- Author: Kiran Desai
- Language: English
- Genre: Novel
- Set in: Kalimpong and the United States, 1986
- Publisher: Atlantic Monthly Press (US); Hamish Hamilton (UK)
- Publication date: 31 August 2006
- Publication place: India
- Media type: Print (hardback & paperback)
- Pages: 336 (hardback edition)
- ISBN: 0-241-14348-9 (hardback)
- OCLC: 65764578
- Dewey Decimal: 823.92
- LC Class: PS3554.E82 I54
- Preceded by: Hullabaloo in the Guava Orchard
- Followed by: The Loneliness of Sonia and Sunny

The Inheritance of Loss is a 2006 novel by the Indian author Kiran Desai. It won several awards, including the Booker Prize for that year, the National Book Critics Circle Fiction Award in 2007, and the 2006 Vodafone Crossword Book Award.

It was written over a period of seven years after her first book, the critically acclaimed Hullabaloo in the Guava Orchard. Among its main themes are migration, living between two worlds, and between past and present.

== Plot ==
The story centres around the lives of Biju and Sai. Biju is an Indian living in the United States illegally, the son of a cook who works for Sai's grandfather. Sai is an orphan living in mountainous Kalimpong with her maternal grandfather, Jemubhai Patel, the cook, and a dog named Mutt. Her mother was a Gujarati and her father a Zoroastrian orphan himself. Author Desai alternates the narration between these two points of view. The action of the novel takes place in 1986.

Biju, the other character, is an illegal alien residing in the United States, trying to make a new life for himself, and contrasts this with the experiences of Sai, an anglicised Indian girl living with her grandfather in India. The novel shows both internal conflicts within India and tensions between the past and present. Desai writes of rejection and yet awe of the English way of life, opportunities to gain money in America, and the squalor of living in India. Through the critical portrayal of Sai's grandfather, the retired judge, Desai comments on leading Indians who were considered too Anglicised and forgetful of traditional ways of Indian life.

The retired judge Jemubhai Patel is a man disgusted by Indian ways and customs—so much so, that he eats chapatis (a moist South Asian flatbread) with knife and fork. Patel disdains other Indians, including the father with whom he breaks ties and the wife whom he abandons at his father's home after torturing her. Yet Patel is never fully accepted by the British, despite his education and adopted mannerisms.

== Themes ==
The major theme running throughout The Inheritance of Loss is one closely related to colonialism and the effects of post-colonialism: the loss of identity and the way it travels through generations as a sense of loss. Some characters snub those who embody the Indian way of life, others are angered by anglicised Indians who have lost their traditions; none is content.

The Gorkhaland movement is used as the historic backdrop of the novel.

== Reception ==
Natasha Walter found it a "grim" novel, highlighting "how individuals are always failing to communicate". The Observer found some excellent comic set-pieces amid the grimness. Pankaj Mishra writing in The New York Times claimed Desai "manages to explore, with intimacy and insight, just about every contemporary international issue: globalization, multiculturalism, economic inequality, fundamentalism and terrorist violence."

In 2020, Emma Lee-Potter of The Independent listed it as one of the 12 best Indian novels.
