= Ribs (recordings) =

Illicitly-produced gramophone discs made from discarded X-ray prints in the USSR

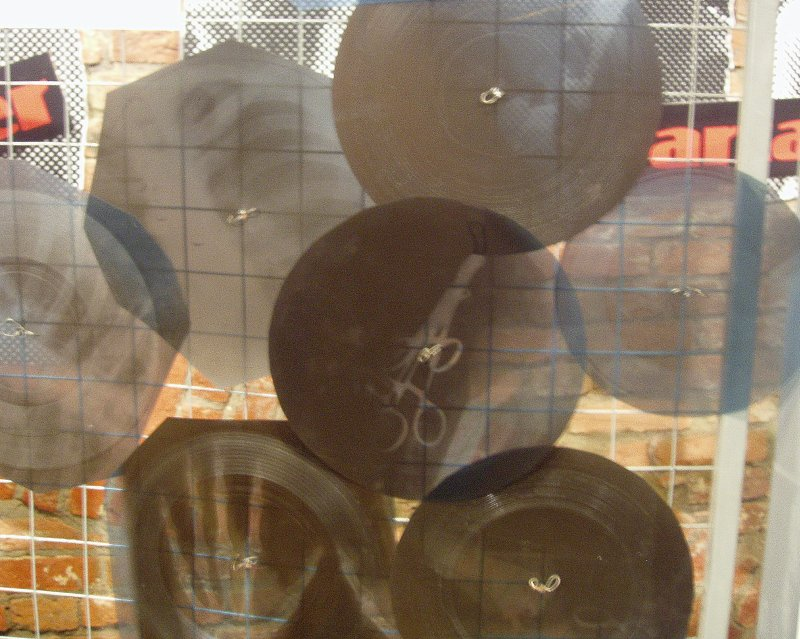
"Rock on bones" Gramophone record (USSR, 1950s). Gallery "Vinzavod", Moscow

Ribs (рёбра, translit. ryobra), also known as music on ribs (Музыка на рёбрах), jazz on bones (Джаз на костях), bones, bone music or roentgenizdat (рентгениздат, lit. X-ray publishing), are improvised gramophone recordings made from polyester X-ray films. Mostly made through the 1950s and 1960s, ribs were a black market method of smuggling in and distributing music that was banned from broadcast in the Soviet Union. Banned artists included emigre musicians, such as Pyotr Leshchenko and Alexander Vertinsky, and Western artists, such as Elvis, the Beatles, the Rolling Stones, the Beach Boys, Ella Fitzgerald and Chubby Checker.

== Production ==
Medical X-rays, purchased or picked out of the trash from hospitals and clinics, were used to create the recordings. The X-rays were cut into 7-inch discs and the center hole was burned into the disc with a cigarette. According to Russian music critic and rock journalist Artemy Troitsky, "grooves were cut [at 78 rpm] with the help of special machines (made, they say, from old phonographs by skilled conspiratorial hands)"; he added that the "quality was awful, but the price was low, a ruble or a ruble and a half." The disks could be played five to ten times.

== Legality ==
The clandestine approach to circulating banned popular foreign music eventually led to a law being passed in 1958 that forbade the home-production of recordings of "a criminally hooligan trend". The "hooligan trend" refers to the stilyagi (from the word stil meaning style in Russian), a Soviet youth subculture known for embracing Western styles of dress and dance.

== Preservation ==
=== The X-Ray Audio Project ===
While on tour with The Real Tuesday Weld in Saint Petersburg, the English musician Stephen Coates came across an X-ray record at a market stall. Coates was inspired to launch The X-Ray Audio Project, an initiative to provide a resource of information about roentgenizdat recordings with visual images, audio recordings and interviews. In November 2015, after several years of research and interviewing bone bootleggers, his book X-Ray Audio: The Strange Story of Soviet Music on the Bone was published by Strange Attractor.

In June 2015, Coates gave a TED talk on the subject at TEDX Kraków. He and sound artist and researcher Aleksander Kolkowski went on tour, telling the story of the Soviet X-ray bootleggers and cutting new X-ray records from live musical performances as a demonstration of the process. The touring exhibition Coates created with photographer Paul Heartfield was covered in The Guardian and on BBC Radio 4's Today programme. In September 2016, the pair released the long-form documentary Roentgenizdat featuring interviews with original Soviet-era bootleggers and archive footage.

In 2019, Coates wrote and presented Bone Music, a documentary based around interviews carried out in Russia for an edition of BBC Radio 3's Between The Ears series. The programme told the story of underground culture of forbidden music in Cold War era Soviet Union and featured the Russian band Mumiy Troll recording a Vadim Kozin song cut straight to X-ray.

=== Archival collections ===
Other preservation projects conserving collections ribs music include:

- The Richard W. Judy and Jane M. Lommel Collection of X-Ray Film Recordings at Great American Songbook Foundation Library & Archives includes 18 distinct records and digitized audio from recordings of The Andrews Sisters and Bill Haley & His Comets.

== In popular culture ==
The short story "Bone Music" from the 2020 collection Good Citizens Need Not Fear by Maria Reva is about a lady who makes her living from the music "on bones".

In the 2026 Apple TV series Star City, Episode 3 features an illicit "bones" recording obtained at a market and played for the "three, maybe four" times remaining on it by character Tanya Mironova.

== See also ==
- Samizdat
- Magnitizdat
- Flexi disc
