= Misinterpretation (novel) =

2025 novel by Ledia Xhoga

- Author: Ledia Xhoga
- Language: English
- Publisher: Daunt Books
- Publication date: 2025
- Publication place: United States
- Pages: 328
- Awards: Booker Prize (longlisted)
- ISBN: 9781917092180

Misinterpretation is the debut novel of Albanian-American author Ledia Xhoga. The novel tells the story of an unnamed narrator living in New York City and working as an interpreter. Despite her husband's opposition, she agrees to work for a man (Alfred) who endured torture during the Kosovo War. She accompanies him to his therapy sessions and provides interpretation. The woman and Alfred develop a love for one another, throwing the woman's life into a deep conflict.

The novel was longlisted for the 2025 Booker Prize. The judges called it an insightful analysis of the tensions between empathy and self-preservation.

== Plot ==
An unnamed narrator from Albania is now living in New York City and working as an interpreter. At the behest of her husband Billy, she recently switched from interpreting to translation. Her husband believes that the narrator is too empathetic, becoming too emotionally attached to her clients, so he counsels her on translation, which requires fewer face-to-face interactions. The narrator speaks Russian, Italian, English, and her native Albanian. The narrator meets Alfred, a victim of the Kosovo War, who asks the woman to accompany him to his therapy sessions and provide interpretation. Alfred has significant emotional trauma from being tortured during the war. The woman agrees.

The woman also develops a relationship with Leyla, a Kurdish poet whom she met at a poetry recital. Leyla has financial problems and unstable housing. Leyla is also being stalked and photographed by Rakan, who was hired by Leyla's ex-husband. The narrator agrees to go on a date with Rakan in an attempt to steal his cell phone and recover the photos.

Soon the woman develops an attraction to Alfred as the therapy sessions progress, with their shared experience as immigrants acting as a medium for the attraction. After one of the therapy sessions, Alfred professes his love for the narrator. Billy becomes distraught as the narrator's emotional attachment to another man and allowing another woman to live in their apartment puts a strain on their marriage. Billy, a film professor from New York University, leaves the United States to take a professorship residency in Hungary. The narrator, wracked with feelings of ambivalence, also decides to leave the United States, visiting her mother in Tirana, Albania.

Soon, the narrator returns to New York City and arranges to meet Alfred at Washington Square Park. On the way to the park she receives a text message from her husband.

== Reception ==
Reviewing the book for the Times Literary Supplement, Megan Marz admired Xhoga's depiction of the main character and her ambivalence between her two loves, and her two countries, stating the portrait of her ambivalence is like that of a Cubist painting. Marz also stated that the novel moves gracefully between fluctuations in tone and setting; between New York City and Albania, and between Alfred and Billy. Marz stated that the main character's abundance of empathy for those around her allowed the characters to be depicted as having many characterizations. Writing for the literary magazine AGNI, Suzana Vuljevic stated that the characters, and their language and dialogue, are nuanced and multilayered. She stated that the language between characters also has a range of interpretations and subtleties that add quality to the novel. Lucy Popescu, writing for The Observer stated: "Xhoga writes perceptively about the alienation of immigrants."
