= Turbulence (Szalay novel) =

2018 novel by David Szalay

- Front cover of the first edition
- Author: David Szalay
- Genre: Fiction
- Publisher: Jonathan Cape
- Publication date: 2018
- Publication place: United Kingdom
- ISBN: 978-1787331167

Turbulence is a novel by David Szalay. It was first published in 2018 by Jonathan Cape.

== Synopsis ==
The novel consists of twelve interlinked short stories, each following a separate character who is travelling by plane. Every chapter title consists of IATA airport codes separated by dashes, signifying the journey taken by that chapter's main character; examples include "LGW – MAD" and "MAD – DSS". One pattern in the novel is a chapter's main character having featured as a secondary character in the one preceding it; another is a chapter title's airport of arrival appearing in the following chapter title as the airport of departure. Additionally, the first chapter title's airport of departure (London Gatwick) is the final chapter title's airport of arrival. On top of which, one secondary character from the first chapter ("LGW – MAD") features again in the final chapter ("BUD – LGW"). The novel thus has a loop-like structure. The round-the-world travel route covered through the 12 chapters is as follows: London – Madrid – Dakar – São Paulo – Toronto – Seattle – Hong Kong – Saigon – Delhi – Kochi – Doha – Budapest – London.

== Reception ==
Alex Preston's review for The Guardian lauded the novel's "effortless prose", and stated that it portrayed "humanity at its most desperate".

In a review for The Independent, David Sexton praised Turbulence, calling it "a chilling achievement" that delves into themes of "human displacement, separation and loneliness" and ultimately "mortality itself".

In a further review for The Guardian, Justine Jordan said that "There's not an ounce of fat to be found, as decades of emotion hang in the spaces between the short, declarative sentences" and pointed out that Szalay employs a "radical simplicity of style" which means that "the stories operate through plot ironies and the sudden illumination of character".
