= Jonathan Buckley (writer) =

British writer (born 1956)

- Born: 1956 (age 69–70); Birmingham, England
- Education: University of Sussex; King's College London
- Occupations: Novelist and short story writer
- Writing career
- Notable work: Tell
- Notable awards: BBC National Short Story Award (2015); The Novel Prize (2022)
- Website: www.jonathan-buckley.co.uk

Jonathan Buckley (born 1956) is a British writer. He has written thirteen novels and a number of travel guides. He won the BBC National Short Story Award in 2015 and the Novel Prize in 2022 and was shortlisted for the Goldsmiths Prize in 2024. His fiction often uses an unconventional narrative structure, including epistolary, polyphonic, and fragmentary narration.

== Early and personal life ==
Buckley was born in Birmingham, England, in 1956 and grew up in Dudley. After completing an undergraduate degree and an MA in English literature at the University of Sussex, he carried out research into the work of Ian Hamilton Finlay at King's College London.

He now lives in Brighton.

== Career ==
Prior to becoming a novelist, Buckley was an editorial director at Rough Guides. He wrote guide books on destinations in Italy and contributed to The Rough Guide to Classical Music and The Rough Guide to Opera.

Buckley's debut novel, The Biography of Thomas Lang, was published by 4th Estate, an imprint of HarperCollins, in 1997. An epistolary novel, it takes the form of a correspondence between a biographer and the brother of his chosen subject, a concert pianist named Thomas Lang.

This was followed by Xerxes, published by 4th Estate in 1999, which interweaves the story of a scholar in 1820s Germany with that of ancient Persian king Xerxes.

His next three novels were also published by 4th Estate. Ghost MacIndoe (2001) is set in London and Brighton and, beginning in 1944, follows the life of Alexander MacIndoe through fifty-six yearly episodes. Invisible (2004) is set in a failing hotel in the west of England, and tells the story of the hotel manager and other characters through the narration of a blind translator, Edward Morton, who is staying in the hotel. So He Takes the Dog (2006) is an unconventional crime novel, set in a dilapidated seaside town and telling the story of a deceased tramp and figures from his life, as well as the man who finds the body and the investigating policeman.

Buckley's sixth novel, Contact, was published by Sort Of Books in 2010. It tells of Dominic and Aileen, a secure and settled married couple, in the aftermath of the arrival of Sam, who claims to be Dominic's son. Michel Faber described it as a "wise, thought-provoking novel" that "deserves to be read and reread".

Buckley published five more novels with Sort of Books. Telescope (2011) is told in the form of the memoirs of a dying man describing his decline and the lives of his siblings. Nostalgia (2013) is set in a Tuscan town and centres on exiled British painter Gideon Westfall. Alongside conventional narration, the novel includes fictional gallery notes, articles, and Who's Who entries. The Guardian described it as "as strange, as nuanced and as peculiar as everything else he's done". The River is the River (2015) concerns a woman who is about to withdraw from society and her sister who is writing a novel. As they interact on a tense visit, stories of multiple characters are recounted, each story leading to further stories.

In 2015, Buckley won the BBC National Short Story Award for his story "Briar Road".

Buckley's tenth novel, The Great Concert of the Night (2018) is told in the form of a diary over the course of a year, including observations, memories and scenes from films starring the diarist's former lover. This was followed by Live; live; live (2020), in which a young man recounts the history of his relationship with his neighbour, a medium.

In 2022, Buckley was the joint winner (with Anne de Marcken) of the Novel Prize, an award for book-length literary fiction that expands the possibilities of the novel form. Prize winners receive $10,000 and simultaneous publication by New York-based New Directions Publishing, London-based Fitzcarraldo Editions, and Sydney-based Giramondo. Buckley's winning entry, Tell, was subsequently published in 2023. The novel takes the form of transcripts of interviews with a gardener about her employer, businessman and art collector Curtis Doyle, who has disappeared. The Times Literary Supplement called it "a fascinating exploration of what it means to tell stories about our lives". The novel was shortlisted for the 2024 Goldsmiths Prize.

Buckley's most recent novel, One Boat (2025), was also published by Fitzcarraldo. It follows a woman making a second visit to a small Greek town after the death of her father, and interweaves past and present as it details her encounters on both visits. In July 2025 it was longlisted for the 2025 Booker Prize.

Buckley is a regular contributor to publications like The Times Literary Supplement. He has been a Fellow at the Royal Literary Fund since 2003.

== Bibliography ==
=== Novels ===
- The Biography of Thomas Lang. 4th Estate. 1997. ISBN 9781857026177.
- Xerxes. 4th Estate. 1999. ISBN 9781857029963.
- Ghost MacIndoe. 4th Estate. 2001. ISBN 9781841152271.
- Invisible. 4th Estate. 2004. ISBN 9780007151875.
- So He Takes the Dog. 4th Estate. 2006. ISBN 9780007228300.
- Contact. Sort of Books. 2010. ISBN 9780956003867.
- Telescope. Sort of Books. 2011. ISBN 9780956308627.
- Nostalgia. Sort of Books. 2013. ISBN 9781908745316.
- The River is the River. Sort of Books. 7 July 2015. ISBN 9781908745545.
- The Great Concert of the Night. Sort of Books. 8 May 2018. ISBN 9781908745774.
- Live; live; live. Sort of Books. 16 June 2020. ISBN 9781908745873.
- Tell. Fitzcarraldo Editions. 28 March 2024. ISBN 9781804270721.
- One Boat. Fitzcarraldo Editions. 2025. ISBN 9781804271766.

=== Guidebooks ===
- The Rough Guide to Venice & the Veneto. APA Publications.
- Pocket Rough Guide Venice. APA Publications. ISBN 9780241204283.
- Pocket Rough Guide Florence. APA Publications. ISBN 9780241238554.
