= Hullabaloo in the Guava Orchard =

1998 book by Kiran Desai

- First edition
- Author: Kiran Desai
- Language: English
- Publisher: Atlantic Monthly Press
- Publication date: 1998
- Publication place: India
- Media type: Print (hardback & paperback)
- Pages: 209
- ISBN: 0-87113-711-9
- OCLC: 39486434
- Followed by: The Inheritance of Loss

Hullabaloo in the Guava Orchard is a novel by Kiran Desai published in 1998. It is her first book and won the top prize for the Betty Trask Awards in 1998. It is set in the Indian village of Shahkot (state of Punjab) and follows the exploits of a young man, Sampath Chawla, trying to avoid the responsibilities of adult life. Fed up with his life in Shahkot, Sampath goes to a guava orchard and settles himself in a guava tree, where he uses the gossip he learned while working at the post office to convince people he is clairvoyant and soon becomes a popular "holy man".

Kiran Desai based this book on a real-life story in which a man, Kapila Pradhan, lived up a tree for 15 years. This was the author's inspiration for the book and there are similarities between the novel and Pradhan's life in his tree.
