= David Szalay =

British and Hungarian writer (born 1974)

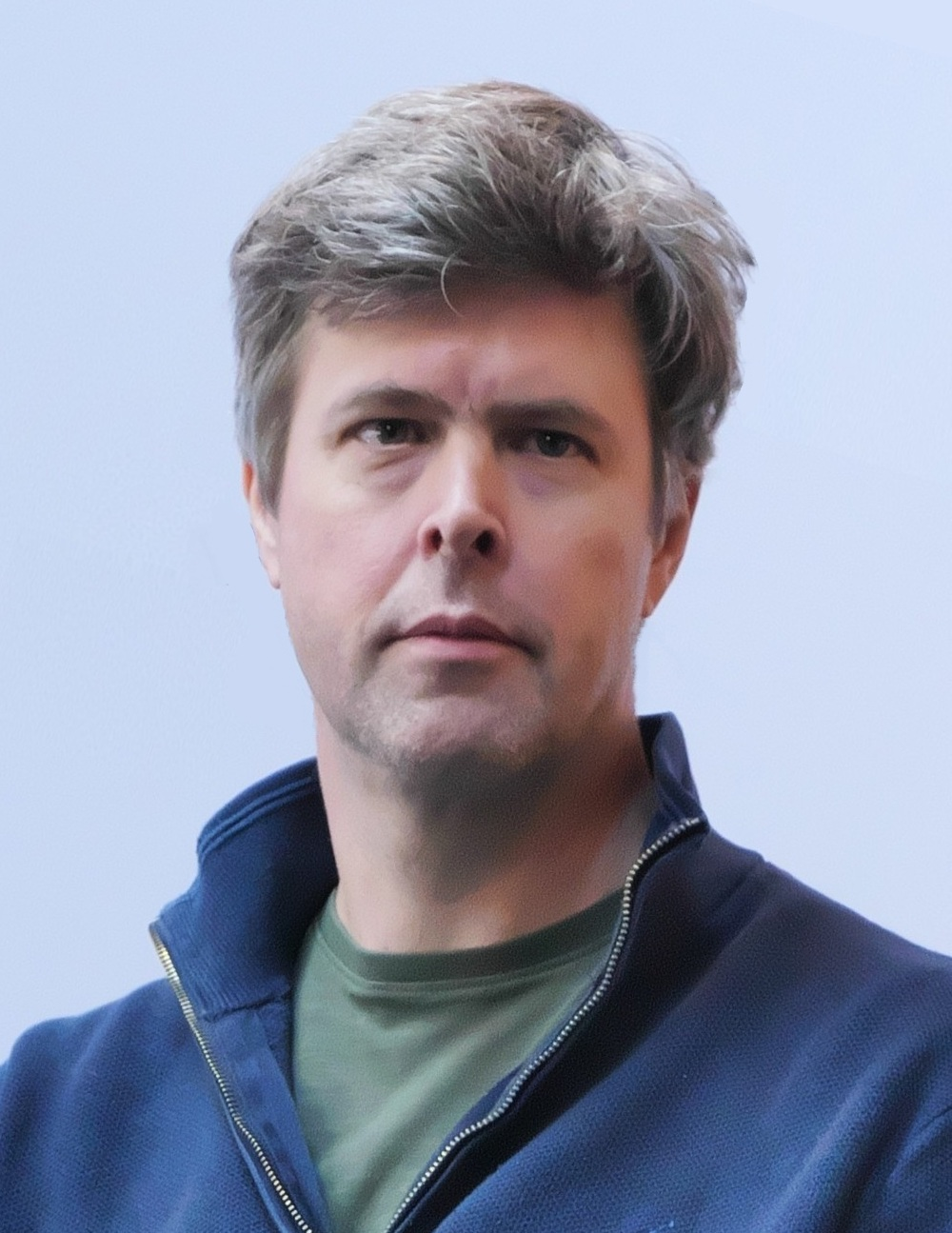
- Szalay at the 2025 Edinburgh International Book Festival
- Born: 1974 (age 51–52); Montréal, Québec
- Citizenship: Canada; Hungary; UK
- Education: Sussex House School
- Alma mater: University of Oxford
- Children: 1
- Writing career
- Notable works: All That Man Is (2016); Turbulence (2018); Flesh (2025)
- Notable awards: Betty Trask Award (2007); Geoffrey Faber Memorial Prize (2007); Gordon Burn Prize (2016); Booker Prize (2025)

David Szalay (/ˈsɒlɔɪ/ SOL-oy; born January 1974) is a British and Hungarian writer. His novels All That Man Is and Turbulence have unique narrative structures with intertwined short stories. All That Man Is was shortlisted for the 2016 Man Booker Prize and won the Gordon Burn Prize that year. Szalay's sixth novel, Flesh, won the 2025 Booker Prize.

== Education and early life ==
Szalay was born in Montreal in 1974, into a Jewish family, to a Canadian mother and a Hungarian father. His family then moved to Beirut. They were forced to leave Lebanon after the onset of the Lebanese Civil War. They next moved to London, where he attended Sussex House School. Szalay read English at Brasenose College, Oxford. After graduating, he worked sales jobs in London. Szalay moved to Brussels, then to Pécs, Hungary, to pursue his ambition of becoming a writer.

== Career ==
Szalay has written a number of radio dramas for the BBC. His 2018 short-story collection Turbulence originated in a series of 15-minute programmes for BBC Radio 4. Its 12 stories follow different people on flights around the world, exploring the globalization of family and friendship in the 21st century. He won the Betty Trask Award for his first novel, London and the South-East, along with the Geoffrey Faber Memorial Prize. Since then, he has written three other novels: Innocent (2009), Spring (2011), and Flesh (2025).

Szalay's linked collection of short stories All That Man Is was shortlisted for the Man Booker Prize and won the Gordon Burn Prize in 2016. The Spectator wrote, "nobody captures the super-sadness of modern Europe as well as Szalay". The Observer questioned its structure and whether it qualifies as a novel in the traditional sense: "does it in any sense work, as Jonathan Cape wants us to believe, as a novel? Yes, there's a thematic consistency that makes this more than a collection, and Szalay even throws in the odd narrative link (the 73-year-old, it transpires, is the 17-year-old's granddad). But still, a novel? I don't think so."

Szalay was included in The Daily Telegraph's 2010 list of the top 20 British writers under 40, as well as the 2013 edition of the Granta Best of Young British Novelists. In 2025, his novel Flesh won the Booker Prize. Szalay is the first Hungarian–British author to receive the award. He said he "wanted to write a book that stretched between Hungary and London and involved a character who was not quite at home in either place." A film adaptation of Flesh was announced in November 2025, with House Productions as the producer.

=== Bibliography ===
The categorization of Szalay's books as novels has sparked debate, particularly in the cases of All That Man Is and Turbulence. All That Man Is comprises nine distinct stories that weave a larger thematic picture. Turbulence is a collection of twelve loosely connected stories about different people. Flesh, while episodic, more closely resembles a conventional novel centred on a single protagonist.

- London and the South-East
- The Innocent
- Spring
- All That Man Is
- Turbulence
- Flesh

== Personal life ==
Szalay lives in Vienna, Austria, with his wife.
