= Katie Kitamura =

American novelist, art critic (born 1979)

- Kitamura at the National Book Festival 2025
- Born: 1979 (age 46–47); Sacramento, California, U.S.
- Education: Princeton University (BA); London Consortium (PhD)
- Spouse: Hari Kunzru
- Children: 2
- Writing career
- Language: English
- Notable works: A Separation (2017); Intimacies (2021); Audition (2025)
- Notable awards: Guggenheim Fellow (2025)

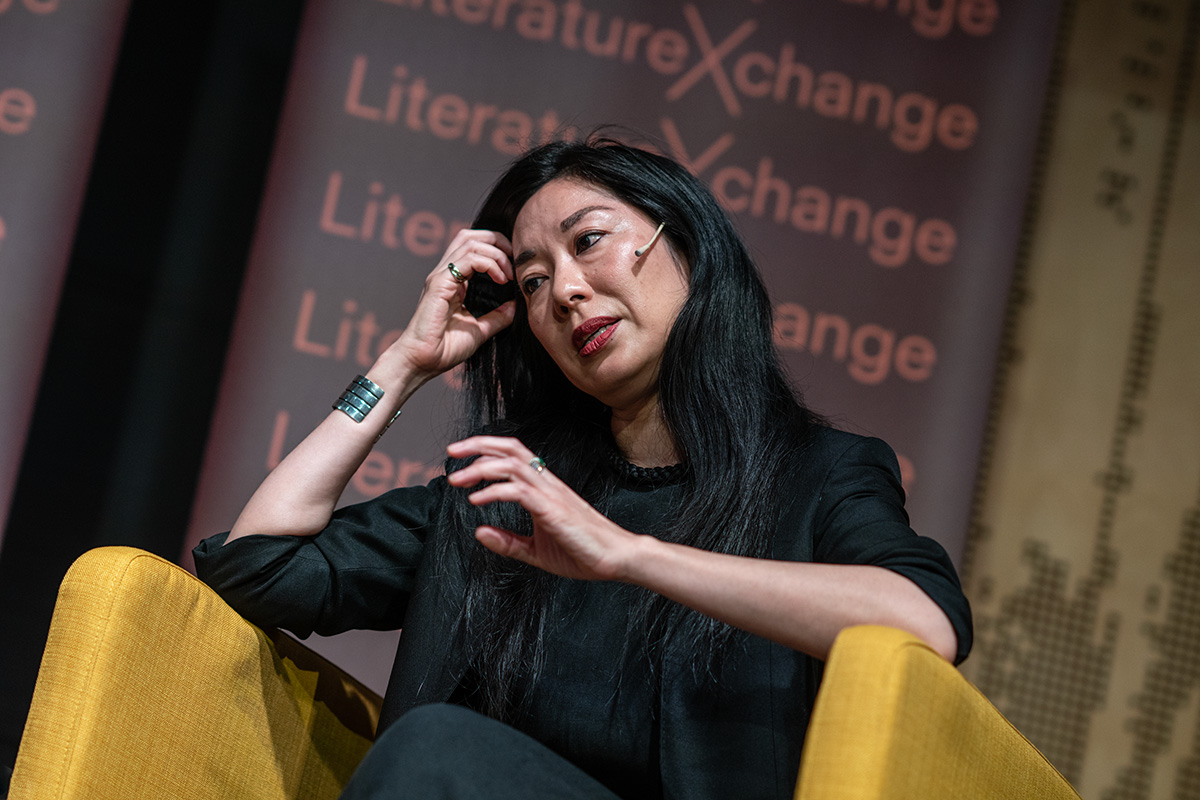
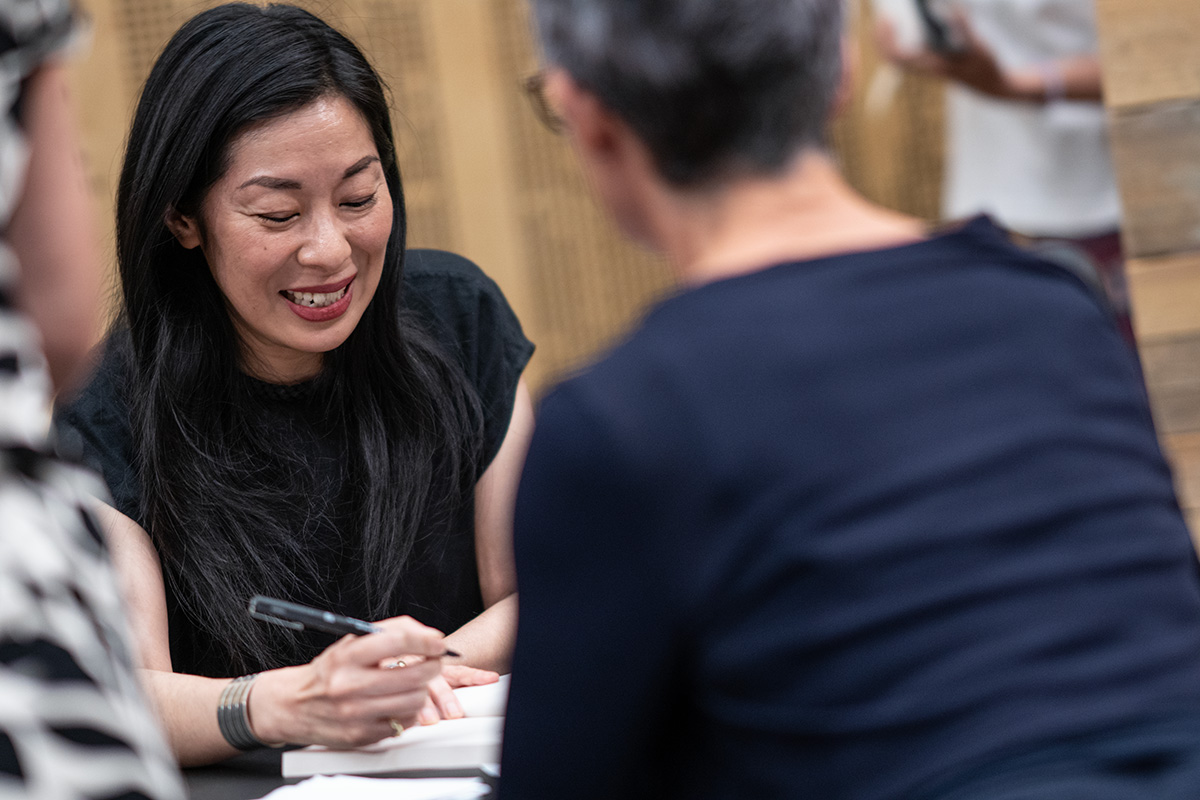
LiteratureXcange Festival
(Denmark 2026)

Katie Kitamura (born 1979) is an American novelist, journalist, and art critic known for her minimalist and psychologically intense prose. Her work frequently explores themes of identity, performance, and the fragility of human connection. Kitamura gained international recognition for her novels A Separation (2017) and Intimacies (2021).

Her fifth novel, Audition, was shortlisted for the 2025 Booker Prize and was a finalist for the 2026 Pulitzer Prize.

== Early life and education ==
Katie Kitamura was born in Sacramento, California to a family of Japanese origin. She was raised in Davis, where her father was a professor at the UC Davis Department of Civil and Environmental Engineering. Kitamura trained as a ballerina before pursuing writing.

Kitamura graduated from Princeton University in New Jersey in 1999. She earned a PhD in American literature from the London Consortium. Her thesis was titled The Aesthetics of Vulgarity and the Modern American Novel (2005).

== Career ==
Kitamura wrote Japanese for Travellers: A Journey, describing her travels across Japan and examining the dichotomies of its society and her own place in it as a Japanese-American.

Kitamura was introduced to mixed martial arts in Japan by her brother. Her first novel, The Longshot, published in 2009, is about the preparation undertaken by a fighter and his trainer ahead of a championship bout against a famous opponent. The cover art of the US edition of the book features the title tattooed on knuckles; the knuckles are her brother's.

Kitamura's second novel, Gone to the Forest, published in 2013, is set in an unnamed colonial country and describes the life and suffering of a landowning family against a backdrop of civil strife and political change.

Kitamura gained wider recognition with A Separation (2017), a novel about a woman who travels to Greece to locate her estranged husband, only to confront truths about their relationship. The book was praised for its taut and propulsive prose. A Separation was originally set to be adapted into a film starring Katherine Waterston. In 2026, it was announced that Tessa Thompson would instead co-produce and star in the adaptation to be written and directed by Jonas Carpignano.

Her 2021 novel, Intimacies, follows an interpreter working at the International Criminal Court at The Hague. The novel explores language, power, and ethical responsibility, and was widely acclaimed for its examination of institutional and personal ethics. It was named one of the best books for the year by several publications.

Kitamura has written for The Guardian, The New York Times, Wired, and Frieze. She has written articles on mixed martial arts, film criticism and analysis, and art criticism.

Kitamura teaches creative writing at New York University.

She was the 2025-2026 Mary Ellen von der Heyden Fellow of the Dorothy and Lewis B. Cullman Center for Scholars and Writers at the New York Public Library.

== Personal life ==
Kitamura is married to author Hari Kunzru; the couple have two children together.

== Awards and recognition ==
In 2010, Kitamura's The Longshot was shortlisted for the New York Public Library's Young Lions Fiction Award. In 2013, her Gone to the Forest was also shortlisted for the Young Lions Fiction Award. In 2021, Intimacies was longlisted for the National Book Award for Fiction, and in 2022 was longlisted for the PEN/Faulkner Award for Fiction. In 2025, Kitamura was awarded a Guggenheim Fellowship.

Her novel Audition was shortlisted for the 2025 Booker Prize and was a finalist for the 2025 National Book Critics Circle Award. It was longlisted for the 2026 Carol Shields Prize for Fiction and Women's Prize for Fiction. The novel was a finalist for the 2026 Pulitzer Prize for Fiction.

== Selected bibliography ==
=== Autobiography ===
- —— (2006). Japanese for Travellers: A Journey. Hamish Hamilton. ISBN 978-0241142899.

=== Novels ===
- —— (2009). The Longshot: A Novel. Free Press. ISBN 978-1439117606.
- —— (2013). Gone to the Forest. Profile Books. ISBN 978-1847659071.
- —— (2017). A Separation. Penguin Random House. ISBN 978-0399576126.
- —— (2021). Intimacies. Riverhead Books. ISBN 978-0399576164.
- —— (2025). Audition. Riverhead Books. ISBN 978-0593852323.
