= Benjamin Markovits =

British-American writer (born 1973)

Benjamin Markovits FRSL
- Born: California, United States
- Education: Yale University; University of Oxford
- Occupation: Writer
- Employer: Royal Holloway, University of London
- Notable work: You Don't Have To Live Like This (2015); The Rest of Our Lives (2025)
- Awards: James Tait Black Prize for Fiction

Benjamin Markovits FRSL (born 1973) is a British-American writer. He is the author of twelve novels, among them a trilogy on the life of poet Lord Byron. Markovits was selected as one of the Best of Young British Novelists by Granta magazine in 2013. In 2016, his novel You Don't Have To Live Like This won the James Tait Black Prize for Fiction. In 2025, his novel The Rest of Our Lives was shortlisted for the 2025 Booker Prize.

== Background ==
Born in 1973 in California, United States, Ben Markovits grew up in Texas, London and Berlin, and studied at Yale University and the University of Oxford. He has worked as a high-school English teacher and as the editor of a left-wing culture magazine. After college, he played professional basketball in Landshut, Germany, for a team in the southern league of the German second division.

Markovits now lives in London, England, where he teaches creative writing at Royal Holloway, University of London.

== Bibliography ==
- 2004: The Syme Papers
- 2005: Either Side of Winter
- 2007: Imposture
- 2008: A Quiet Adjustment
- 2010: Playing Days: A Novel
- 2011: Childish Loves
- 2015: You Don't Have to Live Like This
- 2018: A Weekend in New York
- 2019: Christmas in Austin
- 2020: Home Games
- 2022: The Sidekick
- 2025: The Rest of Our Lives

== Awards and recognition ==
- 2006: Le Prince Maurice Prize
- 2009: Fellowship, Radcliffe Centre for Humanities
- 2013: Granta Best of Young British Novelists
- 2016: James Tait Black Prize for Fiction
- 2018: Elected Fellow of the Royal Society of Literature
