= A Separation (novel) =

2017 novel by Katie Kitamura

- Hardback cover
- Author: Katie Kitamura
- Language: English
- Genre: Novel
- Publisher: Riverhead Books
- Publication date: 2017 (hardcover)
- Publication place: United States
- Media type: Print, ebook, audiobook
- Pages: 229
- ISBN: 9780399576102

A Separation is Katie Kitamura's third novel, published in 2017. The book is being developed into a film starring Tessa Thompson and directed by Jonas Carpignano.

== Synopsis ==
An unnamed woman is separated from her husband Christopher, but they haven't formally decided to divorce, nor have they told their friends and family about the separation. After Christopher has travelled to Greece for work, the woman receives a call from her mother-in-law demanding that she go to Greece to find him. The book recounts the protagonist's search for her estranged husband, and explores the consequences of their decisions.

== Reception ==
The New York Times named The Separation a monthly book club pick as well as one of the 100 Notable Books of 2017, saying "deceptions pile on deceptions in this coolly unsettling postmodern mystery."

The San Francisco Chronicle said "Katie Kitamura’s A Separation should be added to the list of superb novels of romantic endings" and added that "the novel’s incredible strength relies not on the plot twist but on how that plot twist is narrated and renarrated."

The Guardian noted that "Kitamura’s protagonist is a smart, accomplished, contemporary version of that ancient literary figure, the unreliable narrator" and that the book "leaves you intrigued, impressed, but also artfully irritated."

The New Yorker said "In A Separation, Kitamura has made consciousness her territory. The book is all mind, and an observant, taut, astringent mind it is, though there is something almost unhinged about so much rationality in the face of such duress."
