= The Harmony Silk Factory =

2005 novel by Tash Aw

- Cover of the UK first edition
- Author: Tash Aw
- Language: English
- Genre: Historical novel
- Publisher: HarperPerennial
- Publication date: 4 July 2005
- Publication place: United Kingdom
- Media type: Print (Paperback)
- Pages: 384 pp (paperback edition)
- ISBN: 0-00-720451-5 (paperback edition)
- OCLC: 58457161

The Harmony Silk Factory (2005) is Tash Aw's critically acclaimed first novel, set in 1940s British-ruled Malaya, which is now called Malaysia. It was longlisted for the Man Booker Prize, and won the Whitbread Book Awards for First Novel Award. The novel incorporates some historical events, and its characters may temporarily take the roles of real people, for example Johnny Lim acts as Lai Teck in the Batu Caves massacre, though there is otherwise little similarity between them.

== Synopsis ==
Between the wars, Johnny Lim becomes a successful businessman running Tiger Tan’s textile shop in Kampar, a town near Ipoh in the tin-mining Kinta Valley of Malaysia. He marries Snow Soong, the beautiful daughter of TK Soong, the richest man in the valley. They go on a belated honeymoon to the mysterious Seven Maidens islands. Accompanying them are Kunichika Mamoru, a Japanese academic, who will become head of the Kempeitai, the secret police, during the Japanese occupation; Peter Wormwood, an English drifter who has become Johnny’s friend and confidante; and Frederick Honey, a tin mine manager. Later, the shop burns down, and Johnny opens the Harmony Silk Factory, which does very well during the occupation and after. In 1942, Snow dies giving birth to her son, Jasper.

The novel is narrated in three overlapping sections. First, Jasper tells what he knows of his father’s life. Then we read extracts from Snow’s diary, which was handed to Jasper at his father’s funeral. In the third, Peter is now old and living in a care home. He remembers his friendship with Johnny, and what happened on the trip to the Seven Maidens, where he swiped Snow’s diary.

== Reception ==
Booklist called The Harmony Silk Factory "an impressive contribution to a literature for which Conrad and Maugham are famous". The Guardian said the book was "a little rough and transparent in places", but that Aw "writes with what seems like effortless fluidity". Time wrote that Aw "produced a tale of love and betrayal that transcends mere location". Publishers Weekly also reviewed the book, writing "Aw's prose, though often witty and taut, is not equally convincing in all its guises".
