= Five Star Billionaire =

2013 novel by Tash Aw

- First edition (UK)
- Author: Tash Aw
- Language: English
- Genre: Novel
- Publisher: Fourth Estate (UK); Spiegel & Grau (US)
- Publication place: Malaysia

Five Star Billionaire is a novel by Tash Aw, published in 2013.

It was longlisted for the Man Booker Prize for Fiction in 2013 Man Booker Prize.

== Content ==
A series of narratives cover the experiences of five Malaysian Chinese expats attempting to settle in Shanghai in pursuit of financial opportunities.

== Reviews ==
Writing for The Guardian, Aminatta Forna wrote...

Even where the narrative takes a dramatic turn, it is delivered in Aw's spare, fresh, cool, almost dispassionate prose, which though it succeeds in many ways somehow never quite leaves the page. Instead the characters drift towards their various destinies, caught in the whirlpool of Shanghai. There's more than a hint of fatalism in the air.

Jan Stuart, writing for The Boston Globe wrote...

Tash’s ever-spiraling web of connections is as improbable as it is entertaining, but he knits his various threads with an elegance that, coupled with a photorealistic eye for the minutiae of urban life, can distract us from the holes that accumulate over his attenuated narrative...When it comes to deception, in the world according to Tash, two’s a crowd.
