= One Boat =

2025 novel by Jonathan Buckley

- Author: Jonathan Buckley
- Language: English
- Publisher: Fitzcarraldo Editions
- Publication date: 2025
- Publication place: UK
- Pages: 168
- Awards: Booker Prize (longlisted)
- ISBN: 9781804271766

One Boat is a 2025 novel by British author Jonathan Buckley published by Fitzcarraldo Editions. The novel follows Teresa who visits an unnamed Greek coastal town after the death of her father. Nine years earlier she visited the same town after the death of her mother. The narrative shifts between both trips. Teresa, who is an aspiring author, also documents her travels and dreams in writing. The novel shares these journal entries within the narrative, with Teresa's thoughts and entries separated from the events of the novel using italics.

The novel was longlisted for the 2025 Booker Prize. The judges stated that the novel explored themes of identity, free will, guilt and responsibility with nuance.

== Narrative ==
Teresa travels to an unnamed town on the Greek coast on holiday after her father had just died. Nine years earlier, she was in the same town and same hotel room on holiday after the death of her mother. During the first holiday, she is reading Homer's The Odyssey and during the second holiday she is reading The Iliad. Teresa is also documenting her dreams and her experiences in a journal, hoping to one day develop the material into a novel.

On both the first and second trips she interacts with some of the townspeople. She meets Xanthe, a waitress in the café in the town square. During her first trip, she has an affair with her diving instructor Niko, and she meets him again in the second holiday, with Niko now being married. She meets Petros, the local mechanic and also amateur poet, whose rudimentary, child-like poetry is ridiculed by the locals. She also meets John, a man in anguish, struggling with the violent death of his nephew and the suicide of his sister.

== Reception ==
Rachel Armitage gave One Boat a positive review in Literary Review as did Frances Wilson for the Times Literary Supplement, describing the novel as "strange, sly and self-assured." One Boat also received a starred review in Kirkus Reviews.

James Riding was less impressed in The Sunday Times, stating that whilst it "is an attractive, intermittently absorbing novel" the non-linear narrative, which jumps back and forth (sometimes within chapters or even paragraphs) between both holidays, Teresa's notes from both trips, and her retrospective look back on both trips from the present day, "disrupts the flow of the story and the reader’s enjoyment."
