= The South (Tash Aw novel) =

2025 novel by Tash Aw

- Author: Tash Aw
- Language: English
- Publisher: 4th Estate (an imprint of HarperCollins Publishers)
- Publication date: 2025
- Pages: 288
- Awards: Booker Prize (longlisted)

The South is a 2025 novel by Malaysian writer Tash Aw. The novel tells the story of a Malaysian teenager (Jay) who moves from the city to the countryside with his family to manage his grandfather's fruit orchard farm. Jay's grandfather had recently died and willed the farm to Jay's mother.

The book is the first work of a planned quartet which will continue the narration of the characters. The novel was longlisted for the 2025 Booker Prize.

== Synopsis ==
In 1990s Malaysia, seventeen year old Jay's family moves from Kuala Lumpur to the countryside of the state of Johor in southern Malaysia to manage his grandfather's farm. Jay's grandfather had recently died, leaving his fruit orchard farm to his daughter in law Sui Ching (Jay's mother) much to the chagrin of his two adult sons. Sui Ching is married to Jay's father Jack. On the farm Jay meets another teenager, 19 year old Chuan, whose father Fong had been the manager of the farm. Fong is the illegitimate son of the same grandfather (Jay's grandfather, who had Fong with his mistress). Fong has animosity towards the other family members as they have inherited the farm despite not working on it, with Fong feeling his diligence has been ignored.

Over the course of that summer a romantic relationship develops between Jay and Chuan. Chuan, more self-assured in his sexuality, leads Jay to come of age and come out, becoming more assured in himself.

Other parts of the novel tell the story of Jay's parents, who are unhappily married. Jay's mother Sui Ching, once ambitious and adventurous, is now repressed and stifled in the marriage.

The farm, already in a poor state due to climate change and the Asian financial crisis of the 1990s, continues to degrade with many of the fruit trees dying.

== Reception ==
Writing for The Guardian, regarding the two boys' differences in social standing and education level (with Jay's family being more wealthy and having more formal education), Lara Feigel stated that "Aw is brilliant at compressing sociological insight into intimate scenes". Feigel also stated that Aw seamlessly transitioned from the present to Jay narrating his past experiences retrospectively. Feigel stated that Jay's memories in the novel were embedded without feeling "overly engineered". Reviewing the novel in The New York Times, Heller McAlpin stated that Aw has crafted a story "of yearning for autonomy, escape, financial independence and excitement that is suffused with sexual longing and the ache of nostalgia". Heller also stated that the different backgrounds in the novel between the two families (education and peasantry), and between different generations within the same family (ambition and stagnation), created tensions similar to the work's of Anton Chekov (Uncle Vanya and The Cherry Orchard). Writing for The Rumpus, in a mixed review, Aaron Hamburger criticized the pacing of the plot, stating: "The pacing and the plot beats of the love story, while appealing, feel predictable. And once the two lovers finally come together, the story loses steam." But Hamburger also welcomed the novel as an innovative and unique take on the familiar coming-out story in Gay and Queer literature.
