= Jasmin Schreiber =

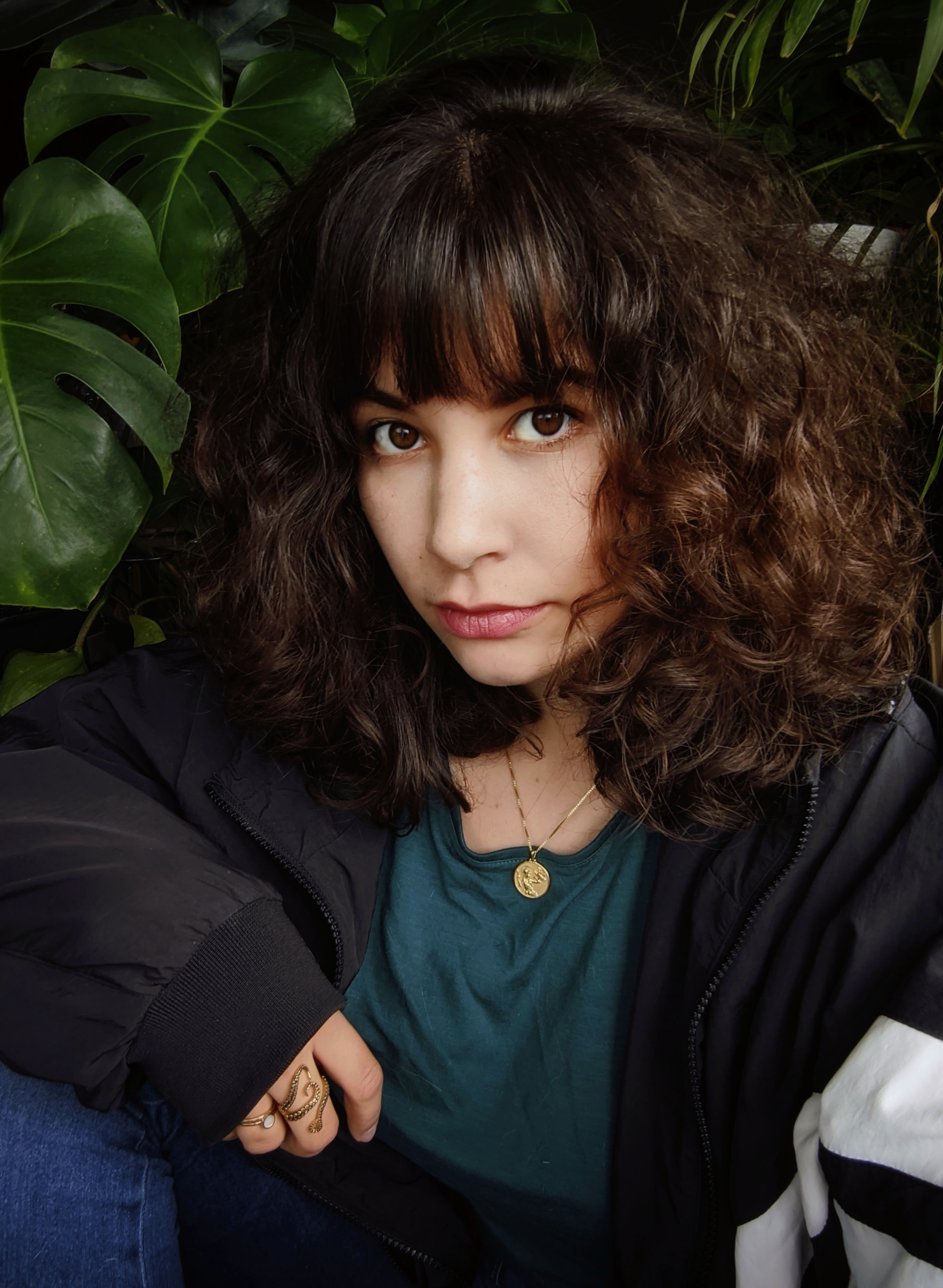
Jasmin Schreiber, 2020

Jasmin Schreiber (born 1988) is a German biologist, science journalist, (Note: Jasmin Schreiber rejects her being described as "blogger" in media.) writer, photographer, and translator.

== Biography ==
Jasmin Schreiber was born in Frankfurt am Main in 1988. She studied biology, specializing in zoology (entomology) and ecology at the universities of Marburg, Hamburg, and Vienna.

As of 2025 she lives in Hamburg with husband Lorenz Adlung, scientist and writer.

== Books ==
- 2020: Mariana Trench (Marianengraben)
  The book was sold out before its official presentation.
  Marianengraben was released as a film in Germany, Austria, Switzerland, and Italy in 2024/25.
- 2020 (with Lorenz Adlung) Liebe, Sex & Erblichkeit. Ein Streifzug durch die kuriosesten Schlafzimmer der Natur
- 2021: Abschied von Hermine
- 2021: Der Mauersegler
- 2022: 100 Seiten über: Biodiversität
- 2023: Schreibers Naturarium
- 2023: Endling
  A dystopian novel set in 2041 about personal problems of the protagonist, species extinction, climate change, and right-wing political rule
  Coincidentally, in 2025, Canadian writer Maria Reva wrote a novel with the same title, Endling, which also involves an endling snail. It turned out they both were inspired by Ed Yong's article "Last of Its Kind" about snail endlings.
- 2025: Da, wo ich dich sehen kann [So, Where I Can See You]

== Awards ==
- 2018: Digital Female Leader Award
- 2019: Blogger of the Year by Die Goldenen Blogger
- 2023: 3rd place at the FastForwardScience Young Scientist Award
