= Ledia Xhoga =

Albanian-American writer

- Born: Tirana, Albania
- Education: Texas State University (MFA)
- Occupations: Writer; playwright
- Writing career
- Language: English

Ledia Xhoga (/ˈdʒoʊɡə/ JOH-gə) is an American fiction writer and playwright. She was born and raised in Tirana, Albania. She lives in Brooklyn, New York. She graduated from Texas State University with a MFA in fiction.

== Awards and nominations ==
- Misinterpretation, debut novel
  - Recipient of a New York City Book Award (the Hornblower Award for the First Book)
  - Shortlisted for Center for Fiction First Novel Prize
  - Best of 2024 Book by Debutiful
  - Longlisted for the 2025 Booker Prize
