= Benjamin Wood (writer) =

British writer

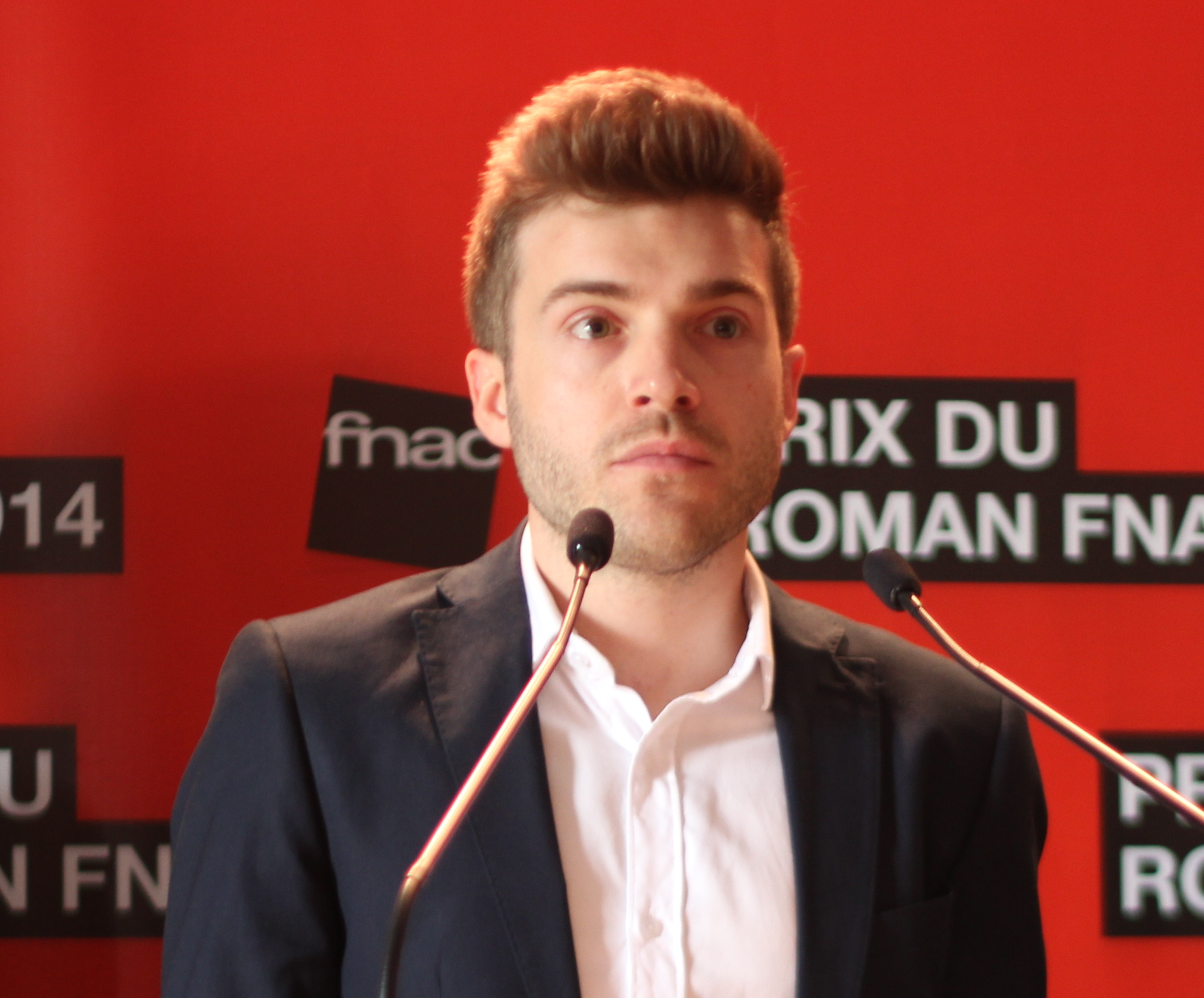
- Benjamin Wood in 2014
- Born: 1981 (age 44–45)
- Education: University of British Columbia
- Occupation: Novelist
- Writing career
- Period: 2012–present
- Genre: Literary fiction
- Notable work: Seascraper (2025)
- Notable awards: Nero Book Award for fiction

Benjamin Wood (born 1981) is a British author and academic who has written five novels.

== Work ==
Wood's first novel, The Bellwether Revivals, was shortlisted for the 2012 Costa Book Award for First Novel and the 2012 Commonwealth Book Prize. It won France's Prix du roman Fnac in 2014.

His second novel, The Ecliptic, was inspired by the three months he spent in Istanbul for an artist-in-residence cultural exchange programme organised by the British Council. It was shortlisted for the 2016 Sunday Times Young Writer of the Year Award and the RSL Encore Award. His third novel, A Station on the Path to Somewhere Better, was shortlisted for the 2019 European Union Prize for Literature and the CWA Gold Dagger.

In 2022 Wood published his fourth novel, The Young Accomplice. It was chosen as a book of the year by The Irish Times, The New Statesman, The Spectator, The Sunday Times, The Times and The Week. A serialised version was broadcast on BBC Radio 4.

Wood's fifth novel, Seascraper, won the Nero Book Award for fiction. It was also shortlisted for the 2026 Walter Scott Prize and longlisted for the 2025 Booker Prize.

== Life ==
Wood was born in 1981, to parents who separated before he reached adulthood, and grew up in Southport. His childhood was spent in a nursing home run by his parents.

As a young man, Wood realised he had a gift for fiction when his sixth-form teacher was convinced that the dramatic monologue he had written for an assignment had been plagiarised from an existing work. At the age of 17 he abandoned his A-levels in the hope of pursuing a career as a singer-songwriter, but failed to get a record deal. He went on to gain a BTEC in art and design, followed by a degree in screenwriting from the University of Central Lancashire. A Commonwealth Scholarship, obtained in 2004 with the help of a reference from the writer Michael Marshall Smith, enabled him to obtain a MFA in Creative Writing from the University of British Columbia. While living in Vancouver Wood was the fiction editor of Prism International.

After returning from Canada Wood worked for several years as a lecturer at Birkbeck, University of London, co-founding and directing their undergraduate creative writing programme. In 2016 he joined King's College London, where he is a senior lecturer in creative writing. He lives in Surrey with his wife and sons.

== Bibliography ==
- —— (2012). The Bellwether Revivals. London: Simon & Schuster. ISBN 978-0857206954.
- —— (2015). The Ecliptic. London: Scribner. ISBN 978-1471126703.
- —— (2018). A Station on the Path to Somewhere Better. London: Scribner. ISBN 978-1471126772.
- —— (2022). The Young Accomplice. London: Penguin. ISBN 978-0241438244.
- —— (2025). Seascraper. London: Penguin. ISBN 978-1405975087.
