= Claire Adam =

Trinidadian author

- Born: Port of Spain, Trinidad and Tobago
- Education: Brown University; Goldsmiths, University of London
- Occupation: Writer
- Writing career
- Notable work: Golden Child (2019)
- Notable awards: Desmond Elliott Prize; McKitterick Prize

Claire Adam (born 1973/1974) is a Trinidad and Tobago-born author whose first novel Golden Child triggered critical acclaim.

On 5 November 2019, the BBC News listed Golden Child on its list of the 100 most inspiring novels. Adam's second novel, Love Forms, was longlisted for the Booker Prize in July 2025.

== Biography ==
Claire Adam was born in Port of Spain, Trinidad and Tobago, the youngest of four children. Her father was a doctor and university lecturer at the University of the West Indies. Her mother, also a doctor, is Irish. After having children, her mother stopped practising medicine.

Leaving Trinidad at the age of 18, Adam went to the United States, where she studied Physics at Brown University. She then lived for some years in Italy and Ireland, before settling in London, England. She earned an MA degree in Creative Writing at Goldsmiths, University of London, where she began work on her first novel, Golden Child (2019), which was awarded the 2019 Desmond Elliott Prize for best debut novel. Golden Child also won the 2020 McKitterick Prize, the 2019 Barnes & Noble Discover Great New Writers Award, and was longlisted for the Jhalak Prize and the Edinburgh International Book Festival's First Book Award.

Adam's second novel, Love Forms, was longlisted for the 2025 Booker Prize.

== Awards and recognition ==
Year	Work	Award	Category	Result	Ref
2019	Golden Child	Barnes & Noble Discover Great New Writers Award	Fiction	Won	
2019	Golden Child	Desmond Elliott Prize	—	Won	
2020	Golden Child	Authors' Club Best First Novel Award	—	Won	
2020	Golden Child	Diverse Book Awards	Adult	2nd Place	
2020	Golden Child	Edinburgh International Book Festival's First Book Award	—	Longlisted	
2020	Golden Child	Jhalak Prize	—	Longlisted	
2020	Golden Child	McKitterick Prize	—	Won	
2025	Love Forms	Booker Prize	—	Longlisted	

== Works ==
- —— (2019). Golden Child (hardcover 1st ed.). London: Faber & Faber. ISBN 9780571339808.
- —— (2025). Love Forms (hardcover 1st ed.). London: Faber & Faber. ISBN 9780571339549.
