= Map of the Invisible World =

2009 novel by Tash Aw

- First edition
- Author: Tash Aw
- Language: English
- Publisher: Fourth Estate
- Media type: Print (Hardback & e-book)

Tash Aw talks about Map of the Invisible World on Bookbits radio.

Map of the Invisible World is the second novel by Tash Aw and was released in 2009. It is about two brothers, Adam and Johan, who were abandoned by their mother as children, and later separated when they were adopted by different families in Indonesia and Malaysia.

== Reception ==
Critical reception for Map of the Invisible World has been mostly positive, with The Guardian writing that the book was "haunting and memorable". The LA Times praised Aw's "intriguing secondary characters", but stated that "In the end, Aw fails to build on what he did so well in his debut novel". The Christian Science Monitor wrote that there were a "couple of coincidences too many near the end of the novel, and certain characters’ motivations remain ever unclear, but Aw’s haunting writing and his detailed evocation of 1960s Indonesia are both masterly". Washington Times staff member Cecie O'Bryon called the book "wonderfully written", praising Aw's "interwoven voices".

The Daily Telegraph criticized the book, citing the suspense as "half-hearted" and the character of Adam as "so infuriatingly passive that he is neither credible nor particularly engaging".
