= The Rest of Our Lives =

2025 novel by Ben Markovits

- Author: Ben Markovits
- Language: English
- Publisher: Faber
- Publication date: 2025
- Pages: 256
- Awards: Booker Prize (shortlisted)
- ISBN: 9780571388547

The Rest of Our Lives is a 2025 novel by Ben Markovits. The novel tells the story of 55-year-old law professor Tom Layward, who is disgruntled and unhappy with his life. Upon dropping off his daughter to college in Pittsburgh, he decides to take a cross-country road trip rather than going home to his wife in New York City.

The novel was shortlisted for the 2025 Booker Prize. The judges called it an unforgettable work about the challenges of marriage.

== Narrative ==
Tom Layward, a 55-year-old law professor from New York City, has just dropped his daughter Miri off at university in Pittsburgh. Instead of returning to his wife in New York, he spontaneously decides to travel across the United States.

Tom feels unfulfilled and unhappy for a number of reasons. His wife Amy had an affair twelve years ago, and he made a promise to himself that he would leave her once their children had moved out of the house. He describes himself as being in a C-minus marriage, which will only give him the opportunity of a B-grade life. His professional life is also in crisis after the university which employs him places him on administrative leave due to a series of violations: he refused to use preferred pronouns on his e-mail signature line, and he provided legal advice to an NBA team owner who is in the public spotlight after making racist and sexist comments. These transgressions cause him to be vilified at the university, and his students petition for his removal. To add to his misfortunes, he has an unknown, yet lingering medical condition that causes palpitations, fatigue, and intermittent facial swelling.

On his road trip across the United States, Tom visits old friends, an ex-girlfriend, and a former business partner, and also interacts with strangers. He eventually reaches California where he visits his son Michael, and plans to visit his father's grave. When Tom was younger, his father had left his mother.

== Title ==
Markovits has said that "I often find it easier to talk to other people in my head when they’re not around – you keep the conversation going, sometimes more honestly and lovingly than you can in their presence. In other words, even though Tom was driving away from his wife, this could still be a novel about reconciling themselves, if not to each other then to the next stage of their lives, which in one way or another they both have to face."

== Reception ==
Writing for The Guardian, Marcel Theroux favorably described the novel as the male version of Miranda July's All Fours; he said the conversational, straightforward prose of Tom's narration is "relaxed precision writing" that is one of the novel's delights. Also in The Guardian, Alex Preston wrote that the novel's brilliance is in its depiction of Amy not as a one-dimensional anatagonist but as a nuanced, "masterly drawn" character with complex motivations and beliefs. He described the work as an innovative take on the road novel, underpinned not by optimism but by the protagonist's pessimism.

In The Times Literary Supplement, Philip Womack called Markovits a master of detailing the complexities of family dynamics and said the marriage of Tom and Amy is shown "beautifully, in all its subtle tones".
