= Good Citizens Need Not Fear =

2020 short story collection

Good Citizens Need Not Fear is a 2020 debut book of Canadian writer Maria Reva, a collection of her short stories.

Maria Reva and her family had emigrated to Canada in 1997. Her tragicomical stories, with overlapping storylines, are set in a fictional town of Kirovka in Ukraine of the last days of the Soviet Union and are inspired by her and her family's experience before the emigration and during her trips back to the old home country, with additional information coming from other sources. The title of the book is a hint to the omnipresent surveillance by KGB, which "good citizens" should not fear.

== Stories ==
The stories are grouped in two parts.

- Part One. Before the Fall
  - "Novostroïka" (Note: "Novostroïka" (новостройка) is a Russian word for a new construction site or a new building.)
  The story is a fictionalization of Maria's parents experience: due to a clerical error their building did not enter the city's registry, and for the municipal services the building did not exist. This is what exactly happens in the story to Daniil Petrovich Blinov living at 1933 Invansk St. The "non-existing" building is central to the collection, with all events happening in or in the vicinity of it.
  - "Little Rabbit"
  Maria Reva says that when she was writing the story "Miss USSR" and elaborating on the early life of its protagonist, a girl nicknamed Zaya, (Note: "Zaya" is a variant of the feminine loving nickname "Zayka" derived from the word zayats, a hare, i.e., emotionally in would be equivalent to "Bunny". However "rabbit" would be krolik in Russian, and there is no loving pet name derived from it.) she realized that Zaya's life in an orphanage is a story by itself. She writes that this was an example how the linkage between the stories gradually formed. The girl got the nickname not because she was loved, but because she had the "hare's lip", Russian for "cleft lip". Reva wrote that initially it was difficult for her to strike a proper balance of dark humor because of the atrocity of the situation in the orphanage where children were written off to die. However she says she had found a proper tone: the story started from the perspective of the orphanage management trying to deliver the logic of why the orphans must be handled this way.
  - "Letter of Apology"
  Somebody ratted on a poet Konstantyn that he told a political joke. Mikhail Ivanovich from KGB tries to extort a letter of apology from Konstantyn saying that in the past he would have gotten 10 years of Gulag, but in modern times he can get away much easier, because... "prisons could no longer accommodate every citizen who uttered a joke."
  - "Bone Music"
  The story is based on a real samizdat practice of the Soviet Union: before the advent of tape recorders the banned Western music was clandestinely recorded "on ribs" or "on bones", i.e., on old X-ray films.
  - "Miss USSR"
  The candidate for the pageant, a Ukrainian beauty Orynko was disliked by the bosses as "too political" ad removed. Konstantyn pulls Zaya out of the orphanage as a substitute, with bizarre consequences.
- Part Two. After the Fall

In this part, the people of 1933 Invansk St. scramble to make for living in the emerged capitalist economy.
- "Lucky Toss"

Konstantyn charges pilgrims for visits to the mummy of a saint he keeps in an apartment next to his own.

- "Roach Brooch"

"Lucky Toss" and "Roach Brooch" have a mystical, Kafkaesque feeling, which somewhat precipitates into "The Ermine Coat" story.
"Roach Brooch" connects to that of the "Bone Music": an old man with ungrateful offspring refuses to remove cancer, because he is entitled to monthly X-rays, which he turns into the "bone music".

- "The Ermine Coat"

At some point in the life Maria's parents indeed had to make living by sewing together ermine pelts for coats.

- "Homecoming"

Zaya returns to the orphanage to work for a business who recreates the experiences of Gulag for wealthy "dark tourists".

== Awards and nominations ==
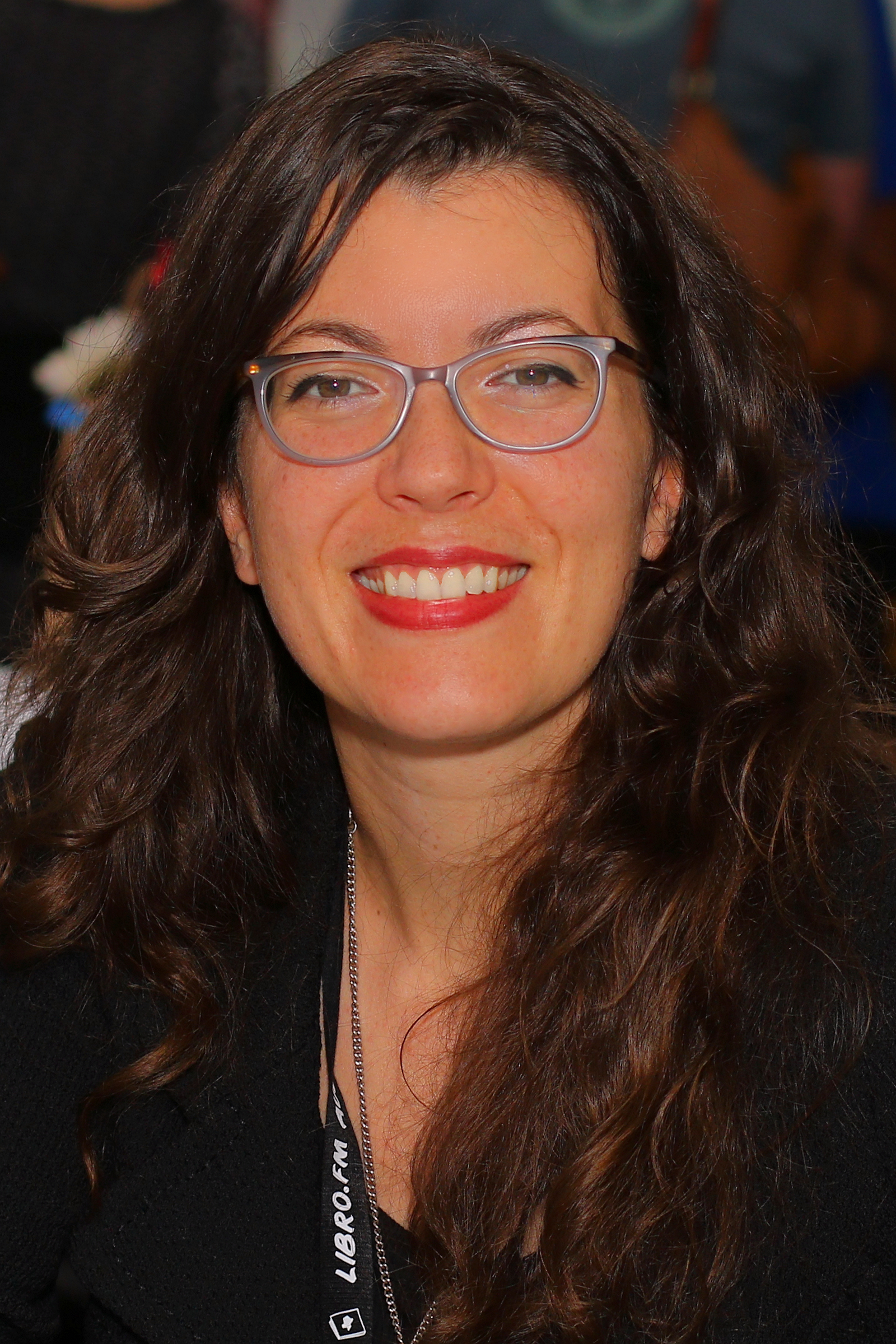
Author Maria Reva

Good Citizens Need Not Fear was considered for several awards:

- 2020: A shortlisted finalist for the 2020 Rogers Writers' Trust Fiction Prize.
- 2020: Shortlisted for the Atwood Gibson Writers' Trust Fiction Prize
- 2020: Globe and Mail: "The Globe 100" book list
- 2021: Shortlisted for Rakuten Kobo Emerging Writer Prize
- 2022: Recipient of the Kobzar Literary Award
