= Seascraper (novel) =

2025 novel by Benjamin Wood

- Author: Benjamin Wood
- Language: English
- Genre: Literary fiction
- Publisher: Viking Press
- Publication date: 2025
- Publication place: United Kingdom
- Pages: 176
- Awards: Booker Prize (longlisted); Nero Book Award for fiction
- ISBN: 9780241741344

Seascraper is a 2025 novel by Benjamin Wood. The novel follows Thomas Flett who lives with his mother on the fictional costal town of Longferry in England. Thomas is a seascraper, earning a meagre living by using a horse-drawn cart to trawl for shrimp on the beach. He then sells his daily catch at a local market. At only twenty years old, Thomas must endure this physically demanding work to eke out a living for himself and his mother, but he has dreams of becoming a folk singer.

The novel was longlisted for the 2025 Booker Prize. The judges called the novel a "mesmerizing portrait" of a man constrained by his circumstances. It won the Nero Book Award for fiction, with the judges describing it as an "utterly immersive read, steeped in atmosphere, that explores what constitutes a well-lived life".

== Background ==
To better depict the beachside atmosphere of the novel, Wood wrote outdoors in longhand rather than typing on a computer to draft the work. He has said that doing this "rain or shine" on a daily basis "really helped me get a sense of what Tom must’ve felt like working on the sea, getting soaked every day."

== Narrative ==
Thomas Flett is a seascraper, waking up at five o'clock every morning to take his horse-drawn cart to the beach at the coastal town of Longferry. He trawls up and down the beach, catching shrimp to sell the same afternoon at a local market, as his grandfather did before him. This meagre living is just enough to support Thomas and his mother Lillian, who lives with him. His father left the house before Thomas was born.

Thomas dreams of becoming a folk singer, and usually practices his guitar after the day's work. However, he is hesitant to perform the songs he has composed before an audience at the local club. He has a crush on a local girl, Joan, who works at the post office, but is too nervous to tell her how he feels about her.

Thomas's mother Lillian entertains suitors in the front room of the house. One of the men she meets is Edgar Acheson, who claims to be a director from America who is in town location scouting for a film adaptation of the novel The Outermost. Edgar believes Longferry can stand in as 1880s Maine in the film production.

Thomas is captivated by this charismatic stranger, whom he believes may be able to assist him in starting his career as a folk singer. When Edgar asks Thomas to be his guide during the scouting process, Thomas agrees and takes him onto the beach at Longferry. Things quickly go awry as Edgar gets lost in the fog and Thomas almost drowns in a sink pit, during which Thomas has a vision of his father as a folk singer, who rejects Thomas after initially inviting him to join his band. He is rescued by Edgar, who invites Thomas for further location scouting the following day.

Upon arriving at Edgar's hotel, he is instead greeted by Mildred, Edgar's mother. Mildred reveals that Edgar is a fraudster, who was psychologically damaged after becoming addicted to benzedrine during his time serving as a soldier in the Second World War. Thomas finds this difficult to believe despite Mildred explaining how Edgar's erratic behaviour not only ruined his promising film career but also drove his family from him. Thomas resolves to remain close with Edgar but, when attempting to visit him one day, is confronted by the stupor Edgar has fallen into while withdrawing from the drug.

Thomas plucks up the courage to talk more with Joan, and he mentions to her he was tasked with returning a car to Mildred near London - a job which would take at least a day. Joan asks to come with him, and that she would like to hear one of his folk songs. The novel ends with Thomas preparing to perform for Joan a song which his father sang in the vision while he was drowning in the sink pit, called 'Seascraper'.

== Reception ==
Jude Cook, writing for The Guardian, stated that Wood's ability to transform "the prosaic details of everyday life" into evocative prose made his writing a pleasure, despite dialogue which occasionally "veers close to folksy."

Christopher Shrimpton's review for The Times Literary Supplement was less positive, criticising the "slightly silly dream sequence" where Thomas writes a song with his estranged father. Shrimpton described the latter parts of the book, when Thomas meets Edgar, as veering towards "emphatic" and "mawkish," in contrast to the novel's richly atmospheric opening.

Johanna Thomas-Corr, writing for The Sunday Times, called the work "a fiercely atmospheric novel that engages the senses." She also commended Wood for his previous novels, calling them "unique and specific" stories centred on "working-class loners who are fascinated by human creativity but get dragged down by treachery, madness or something from their past."

Leah Greenblatt, writing for the New York Times, described Seascraper as a "small but mighty coming-of-age story" in which the author "conjures the briny, locked-in atmosphere of his setting so completely that one half-expects the pages to be stiff with sea salt and a crustaceous whiff of the catch of the day."

In September 2025 Seascraper was chosen by The Economist for its list of 'The best recent novels to read this autumn'.

It was shortlisted for the 2026 Walter Scott Prize for Historical Fiction.
