= Tash Aw =

Malaysian writer (born 1971)

Tash Aw FRSL
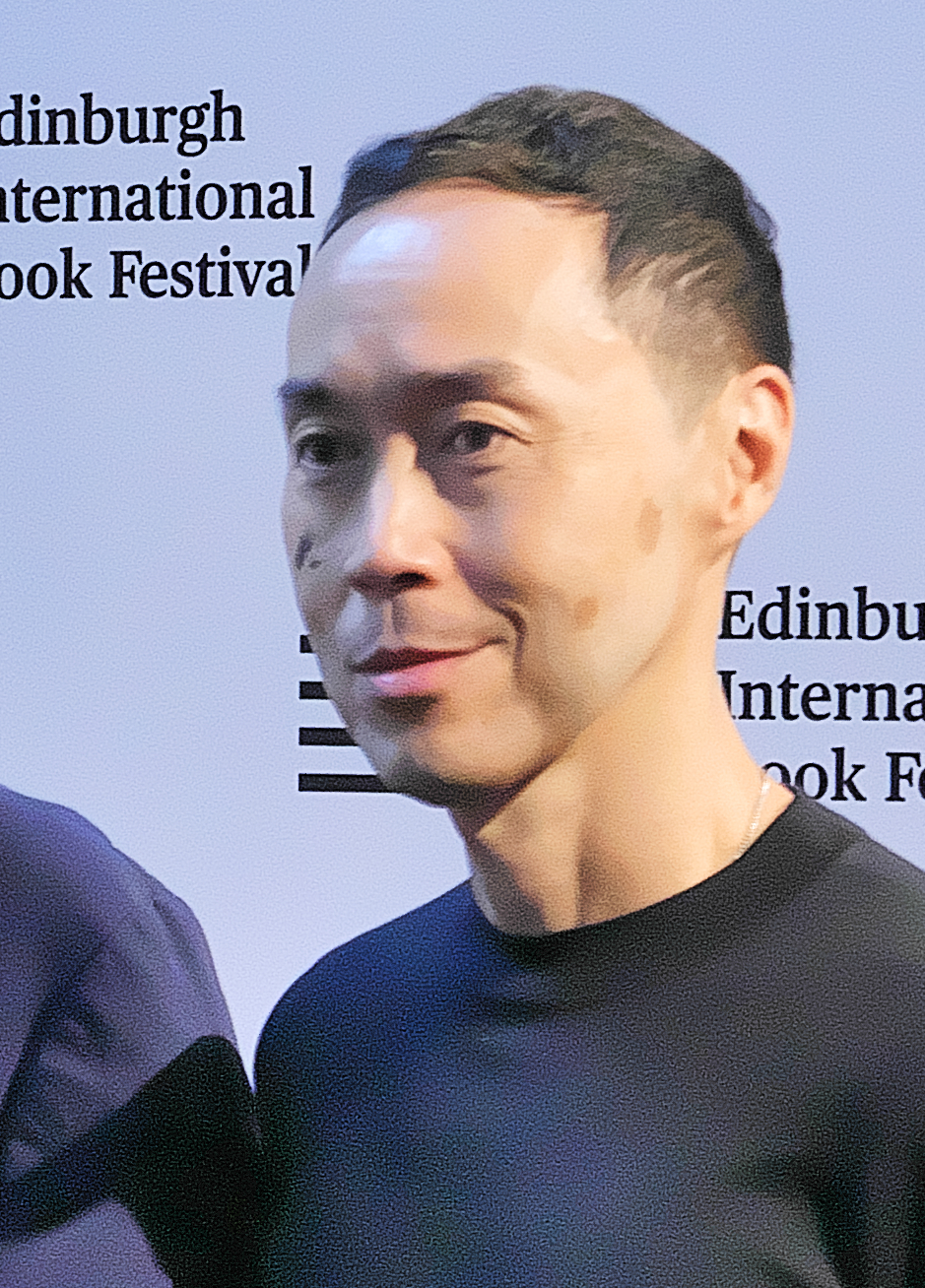
- Tash Aw at the 2025 Edinburgh International Book Festival
- Born: Aw Ta-Shi (Chinese: 歐大旭; pinyin: Ōu Dàxù); 4 October 1971 (age 55); Taipei, Taiwan
- Education: Jesus College, Cambridge; University of Warwick; University of East Anglia
- Occupation: Novelist
- Writing career
- Genre: Fiction
- Notable works: The Harmony Silk Factory, Map of the Invisible World, Five Star Billionaire, We, The Survivors
- Notable awards: Man Booker Prize (longlisted), Whitbread Book Awards First Novel Award, Commonwealth Writers Prize for Best First Novel (Asia Pacific region)

Tash Aw FRSL, whose full name is Aw Ta-Shi (Chinese: 歐大旭; pinyin: Ōu Dàxù; Jyutping: Au1 Daai6 Juk1; Pe̍h-ōe-jī: Au Tāi-hiok; born 4 October 1971), is a Malaysian writer living in London, England.

== Biography ==
Born in 1971 in Taipei, Taiwan, to Malaysian parents, Tash Aw returned to Kuala Lumpur, Malaysia, at the age of two, and grew up there. Like many Malaysians, he had a multilingual upbringing, speaking Mandarin Chinese and Cantonese at home, and Malay and English at school. He eventually relocated to England to study law at Jesus College, Cambridge, and at the University of Warwick before moving to London to write. He completed the MA in creative writing at the University of East Anglia in 2003.

Tash Aw talks about Map of the Invisible World on Bookbits radio.

His first novel, The Harmony Silk Factory, was published in 2005. It was longlisted for the 2005 Man Booker Prize and won the 2005 Whitbread Book Awards First Novel Award as well as the 2005 Commonwealth Writers Prize for Best First Novel (Asia Pacific region). It also made it to the long-list of the world's prestigious 2007 International Impac Dublin Award and the Guardian First Book Prize. It has thus far been translated into twenty languages. He cites his literary influences as James Baldwin, Toni Morrison, Marguerite Duras, William Faulkner and Albert Camus.

His second novel, titled Map of the Invisible World, was published in May 2009. Time magazine called it "a complex, gripping drama of private relationships," and praised "Aw's matchless descriptive prose", "immense intelligence and empathy." His 2013 novel Five Star Billionaire was longlisted for the 2013 Man Booker Prize. In 2016, he published The Face: Strangers on a Pier, a memoir on immigration through the experience of his Chinese-Malaysian family, which was a finalist for the Los Angeles Times Book Prize. His novel, We, The Survivors, published in 2019, was also a finalist for the Los Angeles Times Book Prize. His novels have been translated into 23 languages.

In January 2018, his alma mater, the University of Warwick, awarded him an honorary Doctor of Letters degree. He has been a visiting professor at Columbia University and was the 2018/19 Judith Ginsberg Fellow at the Institute of Ideas & Imagination in Paris. He is also a Fellow of the DAAD Artists-in-Berlin Program.

In 2023, Aw was elected a Fellow of the Royal Society of Literature.

Aw's fifth novel, The South, was longlisted for the 2025 Booker Prize and the 2025 National Book Critics Circle Award.

== Works ==
=== Novels ===
- The Harmony Silk Factory (2005)
- Map of the Invisible World (2009)
- Five Star Billionaire (2013)
- We, The Survivors (2019)
- The South (2025)

=== Short stories ===
- "Notes from a Desert Sketchbook", Off the Edge, Issue 07 (2005) - Off the Edge was a Malaysian English-language magazine, now defunct
- "The American Brick Problem", Prospect, Issue 122 (May 2006)
- "To The City", Granta, 100 (Winter 2007)
- "Sail", A Public Space, Issue 13 (Summer 2011) - won the 2013 O. Henry Prize; republished in The O. Henry Prize Stories 2013, Laura Furman (ed.)
- "Tian Huaiyi", McSweeney's 42 (December 2012)
- "Tiger" (January 2013)

=== Nonfiction ===
- The Face: Strangers On A Pier (2016)

=== Essays ===
- "Writing into Silence" New York Review of Books May 13 2023
- "On Being French and Chinese" Granta 21 November 2019
- "Personal Histories" New York Review of Books May 11 2023
- "The People of the Village" London Review of Books, 16 February 2017
- "You Need To Look Away: Visions of Contemporary Malaysia", The Weeklings, 4 April 2014
- "A Stranger at the Family Table", NewYorker.com, 11 February 2016
- "Bridge to Nowhere ", The Fabulist, Issue 16
- "Burgess and the Malay Novels", Burgess at 100, Episode 2
- "Living and Writing as a Divided Southeast-Asian: On Privilege, Unfairness, and Wanting More From Life", Literary Hub, 10 September 2019
- Collected Op-Ed Articles from The New York Times, nytimes.com, 2014-

=== As translator ===
- Édouard Louis - A Woman's Battles and Transformations (2022) - shortlisted for the TA First Translation Prize 2023
- Édouard Louis - Collapse (2026)

=== As editor ===
- X-24: Unclassified (2007) (co-editor with Nii Parkes)
