= Golden Child (novel) =

2019 novel by Claire Adam

- First edition cover
- Author: Claire Adam
- Audio read by: Obi Abili
- Language: English
- Genre: Literary fiction
- Set in: Trinidad and Tobago
- Publisher: Faber & Faber (UK); SJP for Hogarth (US)
- Publication date: 17 January 2019 (UK); 29 January 2019 (US)
- Publication place: United Kingdom; United States
- Media type: Print (hardcover, paperback)
- Pages: 272 pp (hardcover UK 1st ed.)
- Awards: Barnes & Noble Discover Prize (2019); Desmond Elliott Prize (2019); Authors' Club Best First Novel Award (2020); McKitterick Prize (2020)
- ISBN: 9780571339808 (hardcover UK 1st ed.)
- OCLC: 1083263873
- Dewey Decimal: 823.92
- LC Class: PR9272.9.A33 G65 2019c

Golden Child is a 2019 literary novel by Trinidadian author Claire Adam.

Set in rural Trinidad, it won the Desmond Elliott Prize and was selected on a 2019 BBC list of 100 most inspiring novels.

== Plot ==
The narrative of Golden Child is presented in a non-linear fashion. It begins with Clyde Deyalsingh returning home to his wife in Trinidad and Tobago. He calls for his son Paul to help him remove the guard dog from the gate so he can park his car. Paul's twin brother Peter arrives and informs Clyde that Paul went to the river, and now his whereabouts are unknown. Clyde searches for him but to no avail, and by midnight, he is seriously worried.

Clyde recalls a break-in that occurred two weeks prior, where Paul provoked the robbers and endangered Joy's life. This incident led to a confrontation between Clyde and Paul, during which Paul remained silent, further angering Clyde, who subsequently forbade him from attending a highly anticipated event. Clyde reflects on Paul's puzzling behavior, including an incident where he found Paul lying on the ground at midnight, staring at the stars.

A flashback reveals that at the birth of his twin sons, Clyde's uncle, a doctor, informed him that Paul had been deprived of oxygen due to a nuchal cord. There were concerns that Paul might suffer from an intellectual disorder, but his uncle-in-law Vishnu observed no obvious abnormalities. Vishnu was supportive of Clyde, covering many expenses for the children and helping Clyde secure a job with more stable pay. Clyde, however, harbors negative feelings toward the rest of Joy's family, including Romesh (who frequently asks for money), Phillip (Joy's affluent lawyer brother), and Marilyn (Phillip's wealthy and pompous wife).

Another flashback depicts a younger Paul becoming overwhelmed and causing a scene during a hair-cutting ceremony, which embarrassed Clyde. Later, Clyde is advised to aim for Peter to attend prestigious institutions like Harvard and MIT. Additionally, another teacher suggests that Paul be taken to a mental hospital, St. Ann's.

The narrative shifts to Paul's perspective. Paul, Peter, and their parents visit his principal, who makes a disparaging joke about Paul being "slow." Paul overhears his parents debating whether to advance Peter a grade, which would separate him from Paul. Paul is indifferent, but Peter chastises him, convinced that Paul will be sent to St. Ann's mental hospital. Paul recalls an incident of stargazing and remembers the deaths of Uncle Vishnu and Mousey (Joy's friend who helped raise them) in a car crash. In her grief, Joy organizes a family reunion.

During a swimming outing, Clyde is surprised by Paul's aptitude. Paul later sneaks out to swim again and witnesses a suspicious security officer rifling through Phillip's car but does not report it. The next day at the beach, Paul nearly drowns, and Marilyn believes she saw someone push him into the creek. Paul, drifting in and out of sleep, overhears family arguments about Vishnu's and Mousey's inheritance.

Later, Joy asks Marilyn to conduct a mental assessment of Paul after learning he must repeat a grade and is struggling academically. During the assessment, Paul walks out and meets a man who invites him into his hut to watch a match. As Paul grows older, he cuts his hair to please his father. Clyde arranges for Paul to attend the same school as Peter. There, Father Kavenaugh, a foreign teacher, notices Paul's incorrect answers and offers extra classes. Paul tells him he is "slightly retarded," but the priest firmly disagrees and pledges to help Paul in his own way. Phillip is later killed by bandits due to his role as a judge in a major drug case.

During a hurricane, Father Kavenaugh drives Peter and Paul home and argues with Clyde about Paul's condition. Eventually, Paul is kidnapped by men outside his house.

== Awards and recognition ==
Year	Award	Category	Result	Ref
2019	Barnes & Noble Discover Great New Writers Award	Fiction	Won	
2019	Desmond Elliott Prize	—	Won	
2020	Authors' Club Best First Novel Award	—	Won	
2020	Diverse Book Awards	Adult	2nd Place	
2020	Edinburgh International Book Festival's First Book Award	—	Longlisted	
2020	Jhalak Prize	—	Longlisted	
2020	McKitterick Prize	—	Won	
