= Endling (2025 novel) =

2025 novel by Maria Reva

- Author: Maria Reva
- Language: English
- Publisher: Virago Press, Doubleday
- Publication date: 2025
- Publication place: Canada
- Pages: 352
- Awards: Atwood Gibson Writers' Trust Fiction Prize (winner); Booker Prize (longlisted)
- ISBN: 0349012717

Endling is a 2025 novel by Maria Reva. The novel tells the story of three Ukrainian women who work as "brides" for a bridal agency in Ukraine that arranges meetings with paying bachelors from overseas who hope to select a wife. The women plan to kidnap a group of these bachelors and hold them for ransom, using the kidnapping as an opportunity to expose the misogyny of mail order bride businesses. Their plan is shattered on the same day they kidnap the bachelors, as Russia launches its 2022 invasion of Ukraine.

== Narrative ==
Yeva is a scientist who is travelling across Ukraine in her campervan that she has converted into a mobile lab collecting endangered snails across Ukraine. She hopes to breed some of the endangered snails to increase their populations; however, many are endlings, the last of their species. She funds her conservation efforts by working for a Canadian company known as Romeo Meets Yulia. The company is a mail order bride business, catering to Western men who pay to travel to Ukraine and attend "romance tours" where they meet Ukrainian women. The bachelors may then select them as brides if they wish. Yeva works for the bridal agency only to fund her snail studies and conservation efforts: she has no intention of having sex or marrying any of the paying bachelors.

At the agency, Yeva meets two fellow women; Nastia, posing as a prospecting bride and her older sister Solomiya (Sol), posing as her translator. The two are searching for their mother, a feminist activist who had gone missing eight months earlier. Nastia and Sol are planning on kidnapping a group of the bachelors and using the crisis to bring attention to the plight of women trafficked in the bridal business and the misogyny of the mail order bride model itself. The two sisters convince Yeva to join the plot, and the three women plan to use her van to hold the hostages.

Pasha is a young Ukrainian expatriate in his 30s living in Vancouver, Canada. He signs up with Romeo meets Yulia so he can select his future Ukrainian wife and re-settle in Ukraine to start a new life in his homeland.

On February 23, 2022, in the Ukrainian capital of Kyiv, the three women execute their plan. They lure thirteen of the bachelors in the back of Yeva's van and drive them to the countryside where they plan on holding them. Their plans are shattered when the following day, Russia begins its invasion of Ukraine.

== Development ==
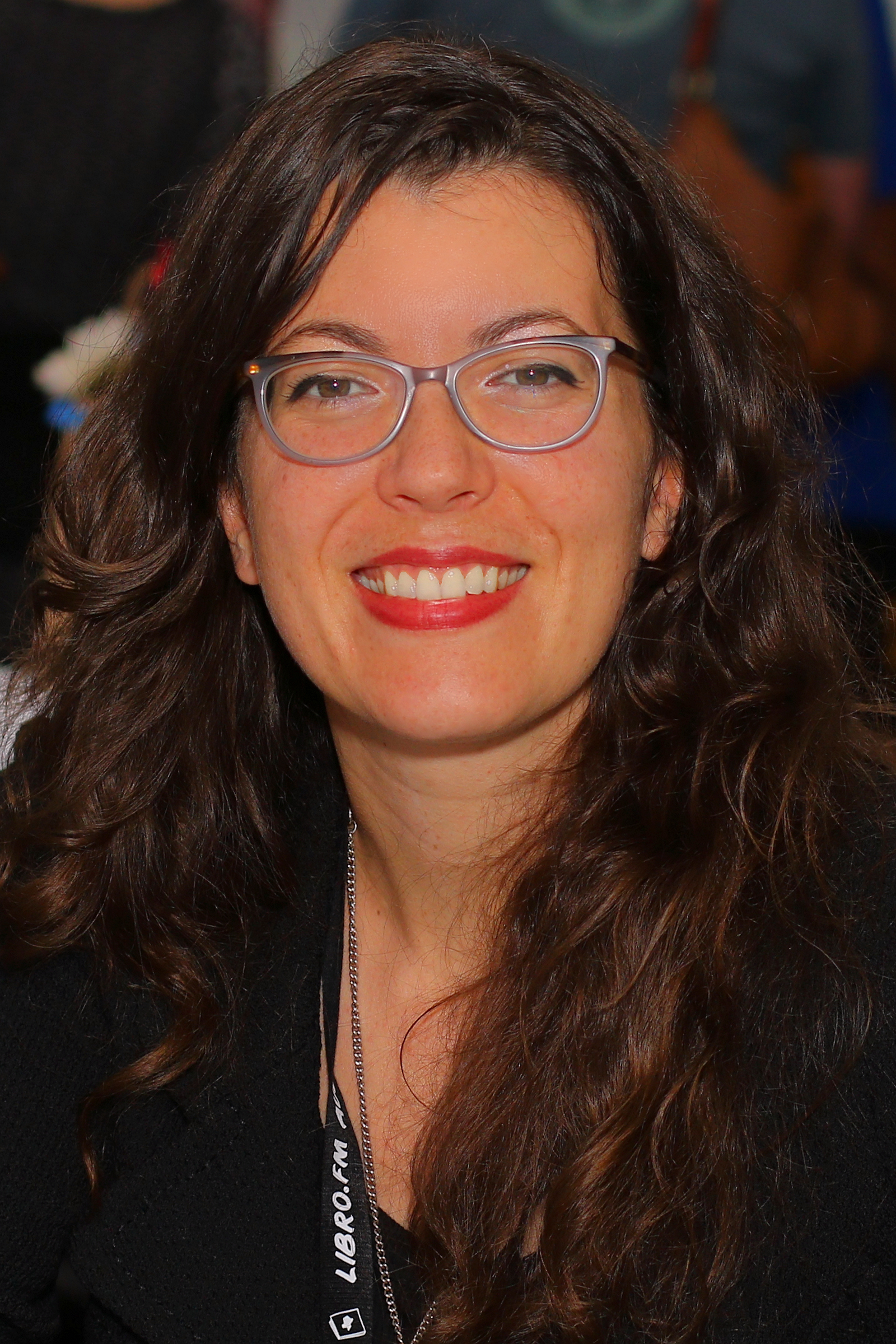
Author Maria Reva

On page 136, in which the Russian Invasion of Ukraine is first depicted, the author Reva seemingly ends the novel. She includes an acknowledgements page, a short author biography (customary on dust jackets) and a note on the typeface used in the book. In the ensuing pages, Reva shares her own thoughts and emotions about the 2022 invasion, and how it feels to experience the war as an expatriate living in Vancouver, Canada. Reva then assumes a fictionalized version of herself (also named Maria Reva) who is an artist in moral crisis, living in her parents' attic in Canada. She describes the shame felt about writing a comedic novel about Eastern European tropes (the mail order bride) while her country is being devastated. She also writes about the guilt of writing from the comfort and safety of her home while her country and her own family members are facing death every day. This fictionalized version of Reva interacts with the characters in the novel.

The title of the book refers to the endling snail in the book. Coincidentally, in 2023, German writer Jasmin Schreiber wrote a novel with the same title, Endling, which also involves an endling snail. It turned out they both were inspired by Ed Yong's article "Last of Its Kind" about snail endlings.

== Reception ==
Writing for The New York Times, Ania Szremski stated that it is hard to write about a war while being removed from it (regarding Reva's writings as herself and her fictionalized self). Szremski stated: "..it’s in some of these passages that Reva’s shining novel, perhaps inevitably, wobbles". However Szremski stated that Reva's grandfather, living in the besieged city of Kherson, was touchingly portrayed. The novel's characters were at his doorstep imploring him to leave, but the man did not wish to leave his home.

Regarding the first half of the book, Marcel Theroux of The Guardian affectionately likened it to a Coen brothers comedy with a feminist message. The Michigan Daily called the plot twist with the metafictional elements in the second half "exhilarating".

=== Awards ===
The novel was longlisted for the 2025 Booker Prize.

In 2025, it won the Atwood Gibson Writers' Trust Fiction Prize.

In 2026, it won the Aspen Words Literary Prize, and was shortlisted for the Amazon Canada First Novel Award.
