= National Magazine =

Several publications have been issued under the name National Magazine, including:

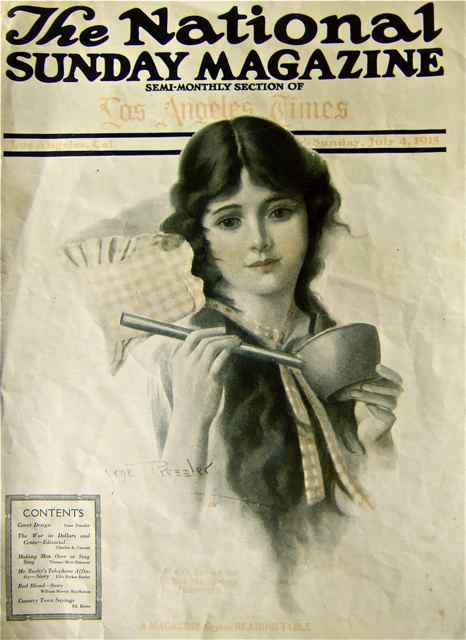
Gene Pressler cover for The National Sunday Magazine (Los Angeles Times, July 4, 1915)

- Magazine of Western History, known as The National Magazine from 1891 to 1894
- The National Magazine (1896), published from 1894 to 1896 as The Bostonian, and from 1896 to 1933 under the new name
- The National Sunday Magazine, published on a semimonthly basis during the early part of the 20th century by the Abbott & Briggs Company. Wilbur Griffith was the editor.

== See also ==
- Nat Mags, or National Magazine Company, a British magazine publisher
