= Kiran Desai =

Indian author (born 1971)

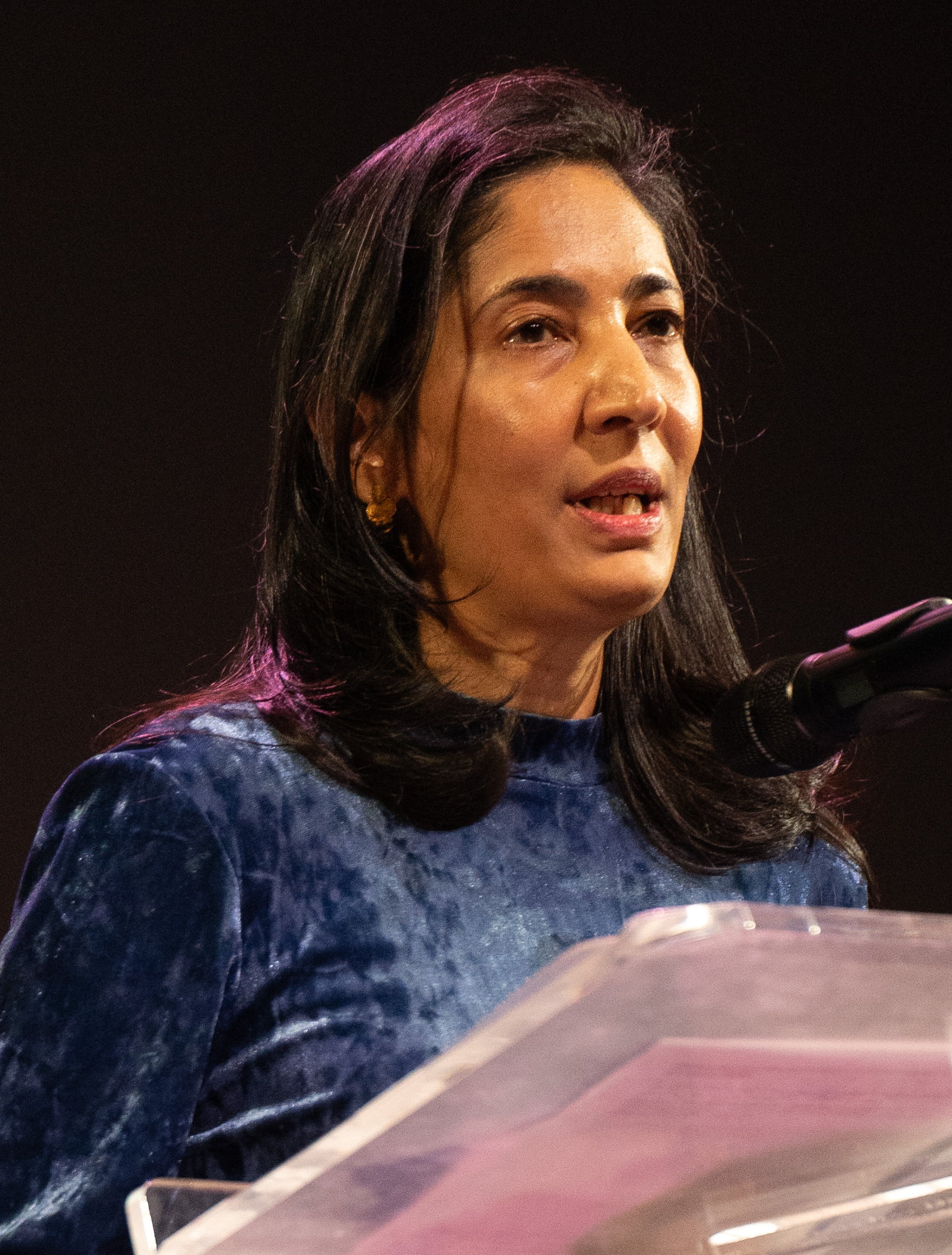
- Desai reading on behalf of Salman Rushdie at the 2024 National Book Awards finalist reading
- Born: September 3, 1971 (age 55); New Delhi, India
- Education: Bennington College, Hollins University, Columbia University
- Occupation: Novelist
- Relatives: Anita Desai (mother)
- Writing career
- Period: 1998–present
- Notable works: The Inheritance of Loss; Hullabaloo in the Guava Orchard
- Notable awards: Man Booker Prize; 2006

Kiran Desai is an Indian author. Her novel The Inheritance of Loss won the 2006 Man Booker Prize and the National Book Critics Circle Award for Fiction. In 2015, The Economic Times named her one of 20 most influential global Indian women.

== Early life and education ==
Kiran Desai is the daughter of author Anita Desai. Desai was born in New Delhi, then lived in Punjab and in Mumbai, where she studied at Cathedral and John Connon School.

Desai left India at 15, and she and her mother lived in England for a year before moving to the United States. She studied creative writing at Bennington College, Hollins University, and Columbia University.

== Literary career ==
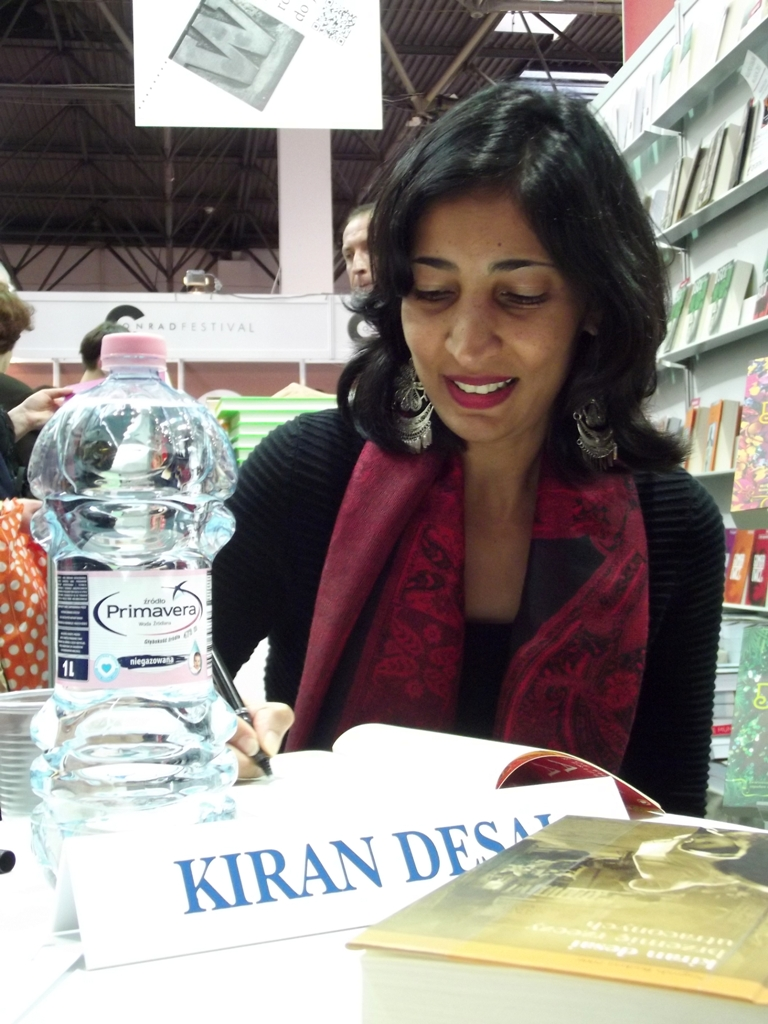
Kiran Desai during a book tour in 2013

Desai's first novel, Hullabaloo in the Guava Orchard, was published in 1998. It won the Betty Trask Award, a prize given by the Society of Authors for best new novels by citizens of the Commonwealth of Nations under the age of 35.

Her second book, The Inheritance of Loss (2006), is set in the Himalayas and explores themes of identity, culture clash, and colonialism. It won the 2006 Man Booker Prize and the 2006 National Book Critics Circle Award for Fiction. Desai became the youngest woman to win the Booker Prize at the time, at age 35.

In 2008, Desai was a guest on Private Passions, a biographical music discussion programme hosted by Michael Berkeley on BBC Radio 3. In 2007, she was the featured author at the inaugural Asia House Festival of Cold Literature.

In 2008, the Gates Foundation invited Desai to report on a community of sex workers in the coastal state of Andhra Pradesh. In 2009, she received the Columbia University Medal for Excellence. Desai was awarded a 2013 Berlin Prize fellowship at the American Academy in Berlin.

In 2017, Desai said that she had been working for more than a decade on a new book "about power [...] about a young Indian woman out in India and the world". After a break of nearly two decades, her novel, The Loneliness of Sonia and Sunny, was published in 2025 by Hogarth, an imprint of Random House Publishing Group. In September 2025, the novel was shortlisted for the 2025 Booker Prize.

== Bibliography ==
- Hullabaloo in the Guava Orchard. Faber and Faber. 1998. ISBN 0-571-19336-6.
- The Inheritance of Loss. Hamish Hamilton. 2006. ISBN 0-241-14348-9.
- The Loneliness of Sonia and Sunny. Hamish Hamilton. 2025. ISBN 9780307700155.

== See also ==
- Desai
- Indians in the New York metropolitan area
- Indian English literature
- List of Indian writers
