= All That Man Is =

2016 novel by David Szalay

- Author: David Szalay
- Genre: Fiction
- Publisher: Jonathan Cape
- Publication date: 2016
- Publication place: Canada, United Kingdom
- ISBN: 978-0224099769

All That Man Is is a 2016 book by David Szalay. A collection of nine intertwined short stories about men at different moments in their lives, it was shortlisted for the 2016 Man Booker Prize and won the 2016 Gordon Burn Prize.

== Reception ==
In his review for The Guardian, Edward Docx described All That Man Is as "the work of a first-rate writer" and that the nine stories "are replete with richly observed humanity".

In a long review for The New Yorker, James Wood first characterises the novel as "bracingly unsentimental about male desire and male failure" and goes on to describe it as being "narrated in an urgent, poking present tense, [where] the pithed characters, of different ages, are presented without complex histories—indeed, without much history at all". While identifying some similarities to the narrative approach of Michel Houellebecq, Wood focusses on three elements that are signs of Szalay's "flight from a certain kind of conventional storytelling": "exclamatory artlessness" (resembling that found in the work of Karl Ove Knausgård); descriptions like those found in film scripts; and use of the aesthetic components of contemporary songwriting. Wood concludes his review by noting that the book is full of "great brilliance and brutal simplicity".

== Awards and honours ==
- 2016: Gordon Burn Prize, winner
- 2016: Man Booker Prize, shortlisted.
