= Intimacies =

2021 novel by Katie Kitamura

- Author: Katie Kitamura
- Language: English
- Publisher: Riverhead Books
- Publication date: July 20, 2021
- Pages: 240
- ISBN: 978-0-39957-616-4

Intimacies is the fourth novel by Katie Kitamura, published on July 20, 2021.

== Plot ==
An unnamed woman leaves New York City, where her father recently died, and moves to The Hague, Netherlands to work as an interpreter at the International Criminal Court. The woman is assigned to interpret for the former president of a West African country on trial for war crimes.

== Creation ==
Kitamura attended the International Criminal Court trial of Laurent Gbagbo, a fictionalized account of which appears in Intimacies. The publishing rights were acquired by Jonathan Cape in February 2021.

== Reception ==
Intimacies featured on a list of book recommendations by Barack Obama for the summer of 2021. Dwight Garner described the book as "a taut, moody novel that moves purposefully between worlds" in his review for The New York Times. Ron Charles reviewed the book for the Washington Post. Brandon Yu compared the work favourably to Kitamura's third novel A Separation. In 2021, Intimacies was longlisted for the National Book Award for Fiction. It was selected for the New York Times Book Review's "10 Best Books of 2021" list. The novel won the 2023 Prix Litteraire Lucien Barriere. It was a finalist for the Joyce Carol Oates Prize and the Grand Prix de l’Heroine.
