= Magazine of Western History =

Magazine of Western History The National Magazine
- Categories: History
- Founded: 1884
- Final issue: 1894
- Country: United States
- Based in: Cleveland (1884–1888); New York City (1888–1894)
- Language: English

The Magazine of Western History, in its last three years The National Magazine, was published from 1884 to 1894. According to the Encyclopedia of Cleveland History, among Cleveland publications it was "the only journal possibly ranked by literary and artistic excellence, although only a small portion was devoted to poetry and fiction." As the magazine's name suggests, most of its contents were devoted to history.

== History ==
Magazine of Western History was founded 1884 in Cleveland by William W. Williams, who was its editor, and L. A. Williams. In 1888 the publication moved to New York City to be published by the Magazine of Western History Co.

In November 1891, at the start of volume 14, the focus on the West was dropped and the magazine was renamed The National Magazine. The name of the publisher changed to The National History Company. Publication ceased after the 17th and last volume in 1894.
