= Maria Reva =

Canadian writer

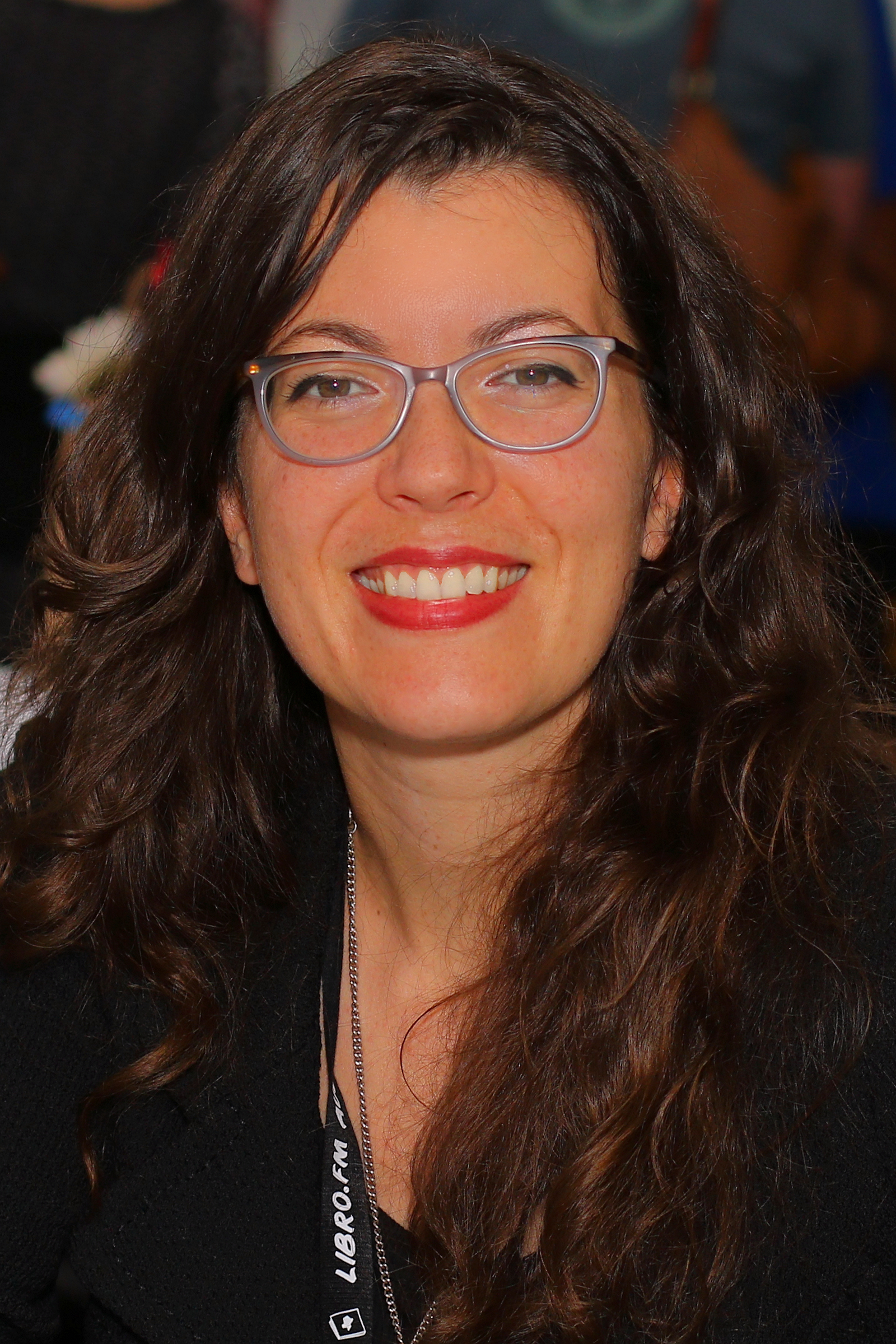
- Reva at the 2025 Texas Book Festival
- Born: Ukraine
- Education: University of Texas at Austin (MFA)
- Occupations: Novelist, short story writer, librettist
- Writing career
- Notable works: Good Citizens Need Not Fear; Endling
- Notable awards: RBC Bronwen Wallace Award for Emerging Writers (2018); Atwood Gibson Writers' Trust Fiction Prize (2025); Aspen Words Literary Prize (2026); Amazon Canada First Novel Award (2026)
- Website: mariareva.ca

Maria Reva is a Canadian writer of Ukrainian descent. She is most noted for her short story collection Good Citizens Need Not Fear.

== Life ==
Maria Reva was born in Ukraine and lived in Kherson until she was 7 years old. In 1997 Reva moved to Canada with her family and grew up in Vancouver, British Columbia. She is an MFA graduate of the University of Texas. Good Citizens Need Not Fear, her debut collection, was based in part on family stories of life in Soviet-era Ukraine. In 2025, her debut novel Endling was published.

Apart from writing fiction, Reva writes librettos for operas working with various composers, including her sister, Anna Pidgorna.

Her work has been published in The Atlantic, McSweeney's and the Best American Short Stories anthologies.

== Books ==
- Good Citizens Need Not Fear. New York: National Geographic Books. 2021-02-09. ISBN 978-1-9848-9758-9.
- Endling. New York: Doubleday Books. 2025. ISBN 978-0-385-54531-0.

== Awards and nominations ==
- 2018: RBC Bronwen Wallace Award for Emerging Writers for the short story "The Ermine Coat", republished in Good Citizens Need Not Fear
- 2019: National Magazine Award for Fiction, for the short story "Unsound", republished as the novelette "Little Rabbit" in the collection Good Citizens Need Not Fear
- Good Citizens Need Not Fear was considered for several awards:
  - 2020: A shortlisted finalist for the 2020 Rogers Writers' Trust Fiction Prize
  - 2020: Shortlisted for the Canadian Atwood Gibson Writers' Trust Fiction Prize
  - 2022: Recipient of the Canadian Kobzar Literary Award
- Endling:
  - 2025: Long-listed for the Booker Prize
  - 2025: Winner of the Atwood Gibson Writers' Trust Fiction Prize
  - 2026: Winner of the Aspen Words Literary Prize
  - 2026: Winner of the Amazon Canada First Novel Award.
