= The Loneliness of Sonia and Sunny =

2025 novel by Kiran Desai

- Author: Kiran Desai
- Language: English
- Publisher: Hogarth
- Publication date: 2025
- Publication place: United States
- Pages: 688
- Awards: Booker Prize (shortlisted)
- ISBN: 9780307700155

The Loneliness of Sonia and Sunny is a 2025 novel by Kiran Desai. With the narrative taking place mostly between 1996 and 2002, the novel tells the story of Sonia and Sunny, both Indian, one a student in Vermont, and the other a recent graduate from Columbia planning to immigrate to the United States, whose families are long acquainted before they first encounter one another on a train in India. The meeting leads to an extended romance between the two young characters through the thrum and churn of the post-colonial world.

The novel was shortlisted for the 2025 Booker Prize. The judges described the novel as an epic of love and family, spanning generations and countries, that is the most "ambitious and accomplished" work by Desai.

== Narrative ==
Sonia is an aspiring novelist who has just completed her college studies in Vermont. She moves to New York City to be closer to her boyfriend, who is a much older accomplished artist. The relationship soon becomes dysfunctional and Sonia leaves him, returning to her family in India.

Sunny is a young journalist living in New York City who works as a copy editor for the Associated Press. He has an American girlfriend. He moved to the United States to flee his overbearing mother. The two know of each other, as each of their grandparents had tried to arrange a marriage between them a few years earlier, believing both were single.

When Sunny travels back to India to visit his grandparents, he and Sonia meet on an overnight train and a budding relationship forms between them, which soon blossoms into a romance.

== Title ==
Desai has said: "I wrote about the rifts between nations, between races, genders, religions, all as a kind of loneliness [...] But I was also interested in loneliness shifting shape into a quiet that is peace after the war is over. A sought-out solitude during a time of transformation. An exquisite artistic loneliness. A discovery of the dignity and privacy of one’s individual being."

== Reception ==
Publishers Weekly, in a starred review, described the novel as Romeo and Juliet for the modern, globalized world. They also stated that the novel is narratively expansive, not just a romance or family saga, but exploring many other intriguing themes.

Kirkus Reviews stated that the vignettes in the novel, of Sonia and Sunny, or of their family members, beautifully coalesce with the central themes of the work.

Writing for The New York Times, Alexandra Jacobs stated that the novel was a meticulous, thorough work in a period of "hot takes and chilly optimized productivity". Jacobs also stated that Desai's inclusive attention to minor characters added richness to the work.

Writing for The Guardian, Alex Clark stated that the novel intricately portrayed the complex, often contradictory internal ambitions and struggles of its characters against the backdrop of a rapidly changing modern India.

Mini Kapoor, in her review published in The Hindu, remarked that Desai had pulled off an astonishing feat.

The novel was shortlisted for the 2025 Booker Prize.

The book was on Barack Obama's list of favorite books for 2025.
