= Yorick Smythies =

British philosopher

- Yorick Smythies (by Peg Smythies)
- Born: 21 February 1917; Shanklin, Isle of Wight, England
- Died: 2 October 1980 (aged 63); Oxfordshire, England

Yorick Smythies (21 February 1917 – 2 October 1980) was a student and friend of Ludwig Wittgenstein known for his notes of the philosopher's lectures. He was also a friend of, and character inspiration for, the novelist (and philosopher) Iris Murdoch.

== Life ==
=== Childhood ===
Yorick Smythies was born on 21 February 1917 in Shanklin on the Isle of Wight where Yorick's maternal grandparents were living at the time. Yorick was the first child of Kate Marjorie "Joe" Smythies née Gouldsmith, (1892–1975) and Cmdr Bernard Edward Smythies DFC who had been born in 1886 in Dehradun, India. Bernard, the younger brother of E. A. Smythies and elder brother of Richard Dawkins' paternal grandmother Enid, was a decorated RAF pilot who was killed in a flying accident at North Weald Airfield on 17 June 1930. As well as being survived by his wife, son, and brother, Bernard "Bunny" Smythies would be survived by his father Arthur Smythies (1847- 1934) and by his daughter, Yorick's younger sister. Yorick was educated at Harrow.

=== University ===
Smythies began the Moral Sciences Tripos at King's College, Cambridge in 1935, graduating with a First in philosophy in 1939.

Smythies attended, and took detailed notes of, Max Newman's 1935 lecture course on logic. Smythies also attended Wittgenstein's lectures in the academic year 1935/36 but (Wittgenstein not normally allowing students to take them in class) his notes of those lectures are sketchy.

Wittgenstein was absent from Cambridge academic life from the autumn of 1936. He returned in early 1938 and Smythies began to take more detailed notes of his lectures from that year. And (although Smythies completed his formal studies in 1939) he continued to do so through the academic year of 1939/1940 and took some further notes during a temporary return to Cambridge between late 1940 and early 1941. (Though Smythies attended lectures by Wittgenstein between 1945 and 1947, according to Volker A. Munz, he "seems to have made little or no notes" during this last period of Wittgenstein's professorship.)

Being one of the few students Wittgenstein allowed to take lecture notes (and, at times, the only one), his notes became key sources for the reconstruction of Wittgenstein's lectures. During his lifetime, some of Smythies' notes were incorporated into Lectures and Conversations on Aesthetics, Psychology and Religious Belief (1966) and Lectures on the Foundations of Mathematics (1976) both being works edited by others. Further notes of Wittgenstein's lectures taken by Smythies were published in 1988 as Lectures on Freedom of the Will. However, a large body of notes, mostly from the period 1938 to 1940, which Smythies called the Whewell's Court Lectures (after the location at Trinity College, Cambridge where Wittgenstein's lectures were held) were only published in 2017 under the editorship of Volker A. Munz and his assistant Bernhard Ritter.

Smythies also became a close friend to Wittgenstein. They conducted an intense written correspondence (most of it now thought lost). And Smythies was, with a few other former students, at Wittgenstein's bedside around the time of his death.

In early 1940 Smythies filed for a military exemption as a conscientious objector, with Wittgenstein writing a letter on his behalf. He received a full exemption and during the war would work for the Nuffield College Social Reconstruction Survey, beginning in 1942. He served as a field officer that evaluated the economic prospects of regions in light of the war. In 1943, after the survey came to an end, he got a job at the Barnett House Library in Oxford with a recommendation from Wittgenstein.

Smythies delivered talks to the Cambridge Moral Sciences Club, and taught philosophy part-time at Oxford in 1944 (on the philosophy of George Berkeley). Oets Kolk Bouwsma recalls Wittgenstein saying, in a 1949 conversation at Cornell, that "Smythies will never get a lectureship. He is too serious." And, indeed, though Smythies did go on to teach philosophy for Oxford's Advanced Student Summer Courses between 1955 and 1957, he never became a professional lecturer and worked mainly as a librarian (latterly at the department of social studies at the University of Oxford).

And although he wrote philosophy of his own, some intended for publication, only a review of Bertrand Russell's History of Western Philosophy is known to have been published during his lifetime. Smythies' review of the History was, as Ray Monk records, particularly "scathing" (and one Russell kept a copy of). Wittgenstein told Smythies he had read the review, writing "and it isn’t bad."

=== Religion ===
Like G.E.M. Anscombe, Smythies was a convert to Catholicism. Though Wittgenstein had been raised a Catholic, he was not a religious believer and said "I could not possibly bring myself to believe all the things that they believe." Wittgenstein reported, to Maurice Drury, that he felt partly responsible for Smythies' religious conversion because he had advised Smythies to read Kierkegaard. Wittgenstein wrote to Smythies in 1944 thus:

Deciding to become a Christian is like deciding to give up walking on the ground and do tight-rope walking instead, where nothing is more easy than to slip and every slip can be fatal. … I cannot applaud your decision to go in for rope walking, because I have always stayed on the ground myself, I have no right to encourage another man in such an enterprise. … I’m really interested in what sort of a man you are and will be. This will, for me, be the eating of the pudding.

=== Mental health ===
Ray Monk's claim (repeated by Peter J. Conradi and Valerie Purton) that Smythies suffered from (paranoid) schizophrenia is disputed by Volker A. Munz. Neither Monk nor Munz offer any explanation for why Smythies might been thought to suffer from this condition, nor, accordingly, does Munz offer any alternative diagnosis. Conradi however identifies a "schizophrenic breakdown" as the cause of Yorick 'hiding behind trees' and "making strange utterances" and mentions time spent by him in a mental hospital. An explanation is offered by Yorick's first cousin, the neuropsychiatrist J. R. Smythies who, also disputing Monk's claims of schizophrenia, claimed that, prescribed amphetamines for depression, Yorick Smythies became dependent on them and subsequently developed a "wholly iatrogenic" chronic paranoid amphetamine psychosis. According to Frank Cioffi, Smythies consulted the psychiatrist Maurice O'Connor Drury about his "schizophrenic episodes".

=== Marriages ===
Smythies married his first wife Diana Pollard (known as 'Polly') in 1944, in Oxford. Diana was the daughter of the British Intelligence officer Hugh Pollard and had, aged eighteen, accompanied her father in posing as tourists to 'camouflage' the covert flight from England that collected General Franco from his 'semi-banishment' in the Canary Islands and took him to Spanish Morocco in 1936. The marriage would end in divorce but Diana continued to live in North Oxford until her death in 2003.

In 1974 Smythies married his second wife, Margaret 'Peg' Smythies née Britton (the ex-wife of Barry Pink, a friend to both Wittgenstein and Yorick) by whom Yorick had already had a son Daniel in 1963. Peg would survive Yorick and go on to marry another friend and former student of Wittgenstein, the philosopher Rush Rhees. Peg would also survive Rhees (who died in 1989) dying in May 2014 having lived latterly in Amberley, Gloucestershire, near Stroud.

=== Death ===
Volker A. Munz, insists, contrary to the claims of Ray Monk, that "there were no tragic circumstances" surrounding Smythies' death, reporting: "Having been afflicted with emphisema for about five years and knowing not to live much longer he died in 1980."

Yorick Smythies is registered as dying on 2 October 1980 in Chipping Norton.

== In literature ==
Smythies was the basis for the character Hugo Belfounder in the novel Under the Net (1954) by Iris Murdoch.

After Smythies died in 1980 Murdoch wrote mention of the character's death into her novel The Philosopher's Pupil (1983) which she was then composing.
