= Vintage Classics =

American publisher

Vintage Classics is a paperback publisher of contemporary fiction and non-fiction. It is part of the Vintage imprint, which is itself a part of Random House Publishers. The famous American publisher Alfred A. Knopf (1892–1984) founded Vintage Books in the United States in 1954 as a paperback home for the authors published by his company. Vintage was launched in the United Kingdom in 1990 and works independently from the American imprint although both are part of the international publishing group, Random House. Vintage in the UK is run by a small team of people working in the Random House offices in Pimlico in London.

Vintage is now a paperback publisher of contemporary fiction and non-fiction, publishing writers such as Philip Roth, Ian McEwan, Richard Yates, Willa Cather, Martin Amis and Toni Morrison. There are many Booker and Nobel Prize-winning authors on the Vintage list, including writers such as Iris Murdoch, who won the Booker Prize for her novel, The Sea, the Sea, and also has been longlisted in the category of Lost Man Booker Prize for her novel, A Fairly Honourable Defeat. The imprint also publishes a huge variety of books while Vintage Classics publishes the great authors of the past.

Vintage Classics has existed since the inception of Vintage and publishes Graham Greene, Harper Lee, Ernest Hemingway and Virginia Woolf, among others. In August 2007 they had a major re-launch of the list, the most high-profile or perhaps controversial aspect of which is the idea of 'twinning' modern authors with established classic ones to provide new ways of thinking about the books, such as pairing Ian McEwan's Atonement with Henry James's What Maisie Knew and Dante's Inferno with Philip Roth's Sabbath's Theater.

== Jacket Design in Existing and New Classics ==
Vintage Classics have also moved away from the traditional idea used by other classics publishers such as Penguin or Oxford University Press of jacketing classics with art from the period in which they were written. Instead, Vintage uses contemporary covers to broaden the book's appeal and to give the entire Vintage catalog a single stylistic signature.
