= The Message to the Planet =

Novel by Iris Murdoch

- Cover of the first edition
- Author: Iris Murdoch
- Cover artist: Tom Phillips
- Language: English
- Publisher: Chatto & Windus
- Publication date: 1989
- Publication place: London, England, United Kingdom
- Media type: Print
- Pages: 563
- ISBN: 978-0-7011-3479-2
- OCLC: 20799871

The Message to the Planet is a novel by Iris Murdoch. Published in 1989, it was her twenty-fourth novel.

== Plot ==
The Message to the Planet centres on Marcus Vallar, a charismatic former mathematician and painter who has abandoned both pursuits, and on a group of Marcus' former associates and friends with whom he has broken off contact. The plot begins with the decision of Alfred Ludens, a young history professor, to seek out his former mentor Marcus in the hope that Marcus can restore his friend Patrick Fenman to health. Fenman is apparently dying of a mysterious wasting disease and believes that his illness is the result of his having been cursed by Marcus. Other members of the group include Gildas Herne, an ex-priest working in an evangelical bookshop, and Jack Sheerwater, a handsome and well-known painter who had been Marcus' painting instructor. Other characters include Franca, Jack's wife, a seamstress who loves Jack deeply and is taking care of Patrick, and Alison, Jack's mistress.

Ludens finds Marcus living on a country estate called Fontellen with his daughter, a young woman named Irina. Irina had confessed her love to Ludens when she was a child, which he had rejected. Irina had run to her father and Marcus had run Ludens out of the house, scolding him. Now, Irina resents Ludens, but Marcus asks him to look out for her. The three return to London where, by a combination of physical manipulation and verbal exhortation, Marcus initiates Fenman's recovery. Ludens is convinced that Marcus is a brilliant philosopher and persistently encourages Marcus to express his thoughts in writing, something he is reluctant or unable to do.

Ludens brings Marcus and Irina to London, but Irina shortly arranges for her father to be admitted to Bellmain, an exclusive mental institution in the country near Salisbury Plain, where she will live with him in a cottage and he will receive treatment from Dr. Marzillian. Ludens is appalled by the suggestion that Marcus is mentally ill. Ludens moves into a hotel in the nearby village and continues seeing Marcus daily, engaging him in opaque and fruitless discussions about philosophy and morality.

News spreads that Marcus is a healer who has raised a man from the dead and is living at Bellmain. A group of new age travellers who call themselves Seekers arrive on their way to visit Stonehenge, wishing to see Marcus. Marcus begins making daily public appearances to the visitors, making a strong impression of holiness. He also receives people asking for healing. Eventually, Marcus renounces his position as a holy man and says he's to stop doing his public appearances, but they continue as crowds persist and grow. Ludens attempts to court Irina; they confess love to each other and Ludens wants to marry, but he wants to take care of Marcus and live with him while she wants to be free of him.

The book's secondary plot concerns the ménage à trois between Jack Sheerwater, his wife Franca, and his mistress Alison. Jack has had mistresses in the past and has told Franca about them while assuring her that these extramarital relationships are temporary and insignificant. However, he decides that his relationship with Alison is to be permanent, and that all three should live together. Franca, still in love with Jack, acquiesces at first, but eventually she decides to leave him, as does Alison. Franca's torment over Alison moving in and her decision to leave in intense and all-consuming, and described in great detail. Franca asks Ludens to marry her, which he rejects. Ludens intercepts Franca's letter ending her marriage to Jack before he finds it, which allows her to renege on her decision to leave him when she finds out that Alison has left.

Ludens finds Marcus dead in the kitchen of the cottage at Bellmain, with a note saying I die by my own will. No one is to blame in any way. I wish my body to be cremated. Marcus Vallar. Irina takes the train to London saying she needs to visit her lawyer in Switzerland, but in reality, she returns to Fontellen and becomes engaged to Lord Claverden. The book ends with scenes of dinner and discussion among Jack, Franca, Ludens, and Gildas in their London homes once more.

== Major themes ==
The Message to the Planet, Iris Murdoch's twenty-fourth novel, continues the exploration of some of the themes familiar from her earlier works. Marcus Vallar is a charismatic and masterful "enchanter" figure, a type featured in many of her novels. According to her biographer Peter J. Conradi, Iris Murdoch said that the character of Marcus Vallar was based on Georg Kreisel. Conradi also notes that Murdoch's seven last novels all deal with the death of a "wise older man", in this case Vallar. In common with other Murdoch novels, The Message to the Planet also explores the relationship between a master and his disciple, Vallar and Ludens respectively.

Two major themes more particular to this novel are the Holocaust and the "dilemma of the religious leader with power and his relationship to suffering". Vallar, who is Jewish, becomes obsessed with the suffering of the Jews, reads books about the Holocaust, and visits Auschwitz concentration camp. At the same time, several incidents and characteristics of Vallar recall the life of Jesus, including an apparently miraculous healing.

The subplot concerning the relationship among Franca, Jack and Alison highlights another characteristic Murdoch subject, the egoism and selfishness inherent in erotic love.

== Literary significance and reception ==
Reaction to the novel was mixed, both by contemporary reviewers and by later critics and scholars. Anatole Broyard, an admirer of Murdoch's novels, wrote that after reading it "I still don't know whether it is a great novel, a merely interesting one, or an unclassifiable pandemonium". Another reviewer remarked that anyone "seeking an untroubled read and pat answers should seek them elsewhere".

In his study of Iris Murdoch's fiction, Peter Conradi wrote that The Message to the Planet was a "lesser" novel, inferior to its predecessor The Philosopher's Pupil, but with some memorable scenes. On the other hand, Suguna Ramanathan calls it "an extraordinary achievement" and "of all her 24 novels, the largest in scope and most powerful in thrust".
