= The Bell (novel) =

1958 novel by Iris Murdoch

- First English edition cover
- Author: Iris Murdoch
- Cover artist: Charles Mozley
- Language: English
- Publisher: Chatto & Windus
- Publication date: 1958
- Publication place: United Kingdom
- Media type: Print (Hardcover)
- Pages: 319 pp
- OCLC: 13437360
- Dewey Decimal: 823.914
- LC Class: PR6063.U7

The Bell is a novel by Iris Murdoch. Published in 1958, it was her fourth novel. It is set in a lay religious community situated next to an enclosed community of Benedictine nuns in Gloucestershire.

== Plot ==
The setting is Imber Court, a country house in Gloucestershire that is the home of a small Anglican lay religious community. It is situated next to Imber Abbey, site between the 12th-century and the dissolution of the monasteries of a convent, and since new buildings were added around nineteen hundred to the remaining medieval bell tower, gateway and refectory belonging to an enclosed community of Benedictine nuns. The owner of Imber Court and the community's de facto leader is Michael Meade, a former schoolmaster in his late 30s. The community supports itself by a market garden.

The novel begins with the journey of Dora Greenfield from London to Imber by train. Dora is a young former art student who is married to the difficult and demanding Paul Greenfield, an art historian who is staying at Imber Court as a guest while studying 14th-century manuscripts belonging to the Abbey. Dora left her husband six months earlier, but he has persuaded her to return to him. On the same train are Toby Gashe, an 18-year-old boy who has just finished school and is going to spend a few weeks as a guest at Imber Court before starting university, and James Tayper Pace, a community member who formerly ran a settlement house and led youth groups in the East End of London.

Among the community members is Catherine Fawley, a young woman who is preparing to enter the convent as a nun. Her twin brother, Nick, is living at Imber Court's lodge. Nick is a troubled and troublesome character, often drunk, who has been invited to Imber Court at the request of his sister in the hope that the spiritual surroundings will be of benefit to him. Fourteen years earlier Michael, then a schoolmaster with aspirations to the priesthood, had been in love with his teenaged pupil Nick. The relationship was unconsummated and apparently mutual, but Nick informed the school's headmaster. As a result, Michael lost his job and did not see Nick again until he came to stay at Imber Court, where the two do not acknowledge having known each other in the past.

The Abbey, which is separated from the Court by a lake, has a bell tower but lacks a bell. Shortly after her arrival Paul tells Dora of a legend from the 14th-century that the original medieval bell flew out of the bell tower and plunged into the lake after a nun broke her vows by receiving a lover in the Abbey. A new bell is being manufactured and will be arriving soon. It will be taken first to Imber Court for a christening ceremony to be performed by the Bishop, and then taken over a causeway across the lake to be installed in the Abbey.

After a few days Michael takes Toby with him to a nearby town to pick up a mechanical cultivator which the community has purchased for use in the market garden. They have dinner in a pub, where Michael drinks too much cider, and on the drive back Michael realizes that he is attracted to Toby, whom he impulsively kisses when they arrive home. Toby is shocked, and Michael is remorseful and later apologizes to Toby, who agrees to say nothing about the incident.

Toby, a keen swimmer and diver, discovers a large object submerged in the lake and concludes that it is a bell, although he has not heard the legend. When he tells Dora what he has found she decides that they should recover the bell and surreptitiously substitute it for the new one. She persuades Toby to go along with the plan, and he uses a tractor to pull the bell from the lake and hide it in an outbuilding in preparation for making the switch the night before the ceremony. However the plan fails, as Toby is prevented from meeting Dora by an encounter with Nick. Nick tells Toby that he saw Michael kiss him, and accuses him of flirting with both Michael and Dora. After winning a physical struggle between the two, Nick sends Toby to confess to James Tayper Pace.

As the new bell is being carried across the causeway for its ceremonial entrance into the Abbey, it falls into the lake. It is later discovered that the causeway has been sabotaged, and Nick is suspected. Catherine runs away and tries to drown herself in the lake. Dora tries to save her, but she cannot swim, and both women are rescued by a nun who has observed the incident from the Abbey side of the lake. When Michael arrives on the scene it becomes evident that Catherine is in love with him and is having a mental breakdown. The following day Catherine is taken to a clinic in London, James confronts Michael with the news of Toby's confession, and Nick commits suicide. In the aftermath of these events, the community is dissolved. Toby goes up to Oxford University and Dora once again leaves Paul and resumes her art studies.

== Major themes ==
A major theme is the yearning for a spiritual life in a materialistic age, which the Imber Court community tries to achieve by partially separating itself from the secular world. Imber Court is intended as a refuge for "half-contemplative" people who "cannot find a work which satisfies them in the ordinary world".

The community members' spiritual pride is the source of much of the novel's humour, as when an officious community member lets Dora know that she has inadvertently broken a rule against bringing fresh flowers into the house. On the other hand, the unreligious outsider Dora, who is looked down upon by the community members, is the only character whose real and nonjudgemental interest in other people allows her to glimpse Catherine Fawley's inner turmoil. In a similar vein, Michael realizes too late that he has been too concerned with his own spiritual well-being to run the risk of trying to help Nick.

The nature of virtue, another major theme, is the subject of two Sunday talks given to the community by James and Michael. James insists that people should strive for perfection by unquestioning observance of a strict moral code, a view which has the attraction of simplicity. Michael, on the other hand, leaves more room for human frailty and suggests moral improvement, rather than perfection, as a reasonable goal.

Michael Meade's secret homosexuality is an important aspect of the novel, which was published only one year after the Wolfenden report recommended the decriminalization of private homosexual acts involving consenting adults. His homosexuality is presented without "fanfare or politics" as one variety of love. Murdoch was notable for her sympathetic portrayal of homosexuals, and after The Bell at least one gay character appeared in each of her novels .

The novel's structure is characterized by numerous sets of doubles and "contrastive pairs", including the twins Nick and Catherine Fawley, the new and old bells, the two communities at Imber Court and Imber Abbey, and the two confessions by Nick and Toby, both of whom are loved by Michael but betray him. These pairs, which contribute a "pleasing symmetry" to the plot, have also been analysed in terms of Murdoch's Platonic view of reality.

Music of various kinds appears frequently and sound is an important image throughout. The sounds include the songs of birds in the forest, which are heard in several scenes, and the bird imitations by one of the community members. The nuns are heard singing in their chapel and some of the Imber Court community sing madrigals and listen to Bach recordings, which Dora dislikes, although she later comes to enjoy Mozart.

== Literary significance and reception ==
The Bell, Iris Murdoch's fourth novel, was published in 1958 by Chatto & Windus in Great Britain and Viking Press in the United States. It was an immediate popular and commercial success, with 30,000 copies of the British edition printed within ten weeks of its publication.

The novel was widely and positively reviewed. The Times, while remarking that Murdoch tended to "explain exhaustively rather than to indicate imaginatively", described The Bell as "a story which is running over with purpose and intelligence" and "a joy to read". Writing in The Spectator, Frank Kermode called it "a very notable achievement". He noted changes in her style over the course of her four published books, and an increased interest in placing her stories "in some large pattern of related meanings". Elizabeth Bowen described the book as "a masterpiece of direct narrative", both "more remarkable" and "more orthodox" than her previous books, but retaining Murdoch's characteristic "dynamic strangeness". In The New York Times, Gilbert Millstein described The Bell as "an addition of consistent excellence" to her body of work. His review noted thematic parallels with Mary McCarthy's 1949 novel The Oasis. Writing in Partisan Review, Irving Howe found the novel as a whole unrealistic and overly symbolic, but praised Murdoch's ability to write "convincingly, without rant or affectation" about love, including homosexual love, which he described as a "rare novelistic gift".

Scholars have analysed The Bell in terms of its relationship to Murdoch's philosophical thought. In the 1950s she published several essays opposing the currently dominant schools of analytic philosophy and existentialism. The Bell can be seen as symbolically demonstrating the shortcomings of both views, with the rule-bound Imber Court community representing analysis with its insistence on publicly observable behaviour as the essence of morality, while the unruly and self-absorbed Nick represents Existential Man. Peter Conradi notes that The Bell is "her first novel to be fuelled by Platonism, in which Good substitutes for God, and any authentic spiritual tradition, including appreciation of the visual arts ... provides a means of ascent".

Both Conradi and A. S. Byatt contrast and compare The Bell with Murdoch's 1963 novel The Unicorn. Conradi sees them both as "toy(ing) with the sublime", which "has at its heart the disharmony between mind and world", while for Byatt the novels are related to each other by their treatment of religious themes.

== Adaptations ==
=== Television ===
The Bell was adapted as a four-part television miniseries by Reg Gadney. Directed by Barry Davis with music by Marc Wilkinson, it appeared on BBC Two beginning on 13 January 1982. The cast included Ian Holm as Michael Meade, Tessa Peake-Jones as Dora Greenfield, and Michael Maloney as Toby Gashe.

=== Radio ===
A three-part adaptation of The Bell by Michael Bakewell was broadcast on the BBC Radio 4 series Classic Serial in November 1999. Among the cast were Cathryn Bradshaw as Dora and Jamie Bamber as Toby.
