= The Red and the Green =

Novel by Iris Murdoch

- Cover of the first edition
- Author: Iris Murdoch
- Cover artist: Margaret Benyon
- Language: English
- Publisher: Chatto & Windus
- Publication date: 1965
- Publication place: United Kingdom
- Media type: Print (Hardback & Paperback)
- Pages: 319

The Red and the Green is a novel by Iris Murdoch. Published in 1965, it was her ninth novel. It is set in Dublin during the week leading up to the Easter Rising of 1916, and is her only historical novel. Its characters are members of a complexly inter-related Anglo-Irish family who differ in their religious affiliations and in their views on the relations between England and Ireland.

The novel combines a thoroughly researched account of the events leading up to the Easter Rising with a complicated sexual farce. It received mixed reviews on its publication.

The novel is dedicated to Philippa Foot.

== Plot ==
The novel is set in Dublin during the week leading up to the Easter Rising of 1916. All the characters are members of a complexly interrelated Anglo-Irish family. As the story begins Andrew Chase-White is a young Second lieutenant in King Edward's Horse, spending a leave with his family in Ireland before accompanying his regiment to France.

Andrew Chase-White grew up in England, the only child of Protestant Anglo-Irish parents. His recently widowed mother Hilda has decided to move to Ireland. Andrew's paternal grandfather was his grandmother's second husband. She had two children with her first husband, Brian and Millicent "Millie" Dumay. Millie married Sir Arthur Kinnard and inherited his property when he died young. Brian, who converted to Catholicism as a young man, married Arthur Kinnard's sister Kathleen, who also converted. They had two sons, Pat (Andrew's contemporary) and his younger brother Cathal Dumay, both ardent supporters of independence for Ireland. After Brian's death Kathleen married Andrew's Roman Catholic uncle Barnabas Drumm, Hilda's brother. A third Kinnard sibling, Heather, married Christopher Bellman and died young. Christopher's only child is Frances, whom Andrew has known all his life and plans to marry.

Andrew and Frances visit Kathleen, Pat, and Cathal in their house in Dublin, and the following day Andrew, Hilda, and Christopher call on Millie in her Dublin house. Millie behaves flirtatiously with Andrew during the visit. Unknown to his family, Christopher is in love with Millie, whom he has been supporting financially for several years, and has been trying to convince her to marry him. Frances dislikes Millie, but Christopher believes this will be resolved when Andrew and Frances marry, because Andrew will take Frances back to England. Millie promises to come to Christopher's house later in the week to give him her answer.

Pat's stepfather Barnabas "Barney" Drumm is another of Millie's admirers. Years before, his passion for Millie had led to his leaving the seminary where he was training for the priesthood. His marriage to Kathleen proving unhappy, he reconnected with Millie and became a frequent visitor at her house, where he has the status of a tolerated relation. When Millie goes to Christopher's house to tell him she will accept his marriage proposal, Barney overhears their conversation.

Millie has been allowing the Irish Volunteers to use her cellar as an arms depository. Pat Dumay, an officer with the Irish Volunteers, has been informed that an armed insurrection is planned for Easter Sunday, and comes to Millie's house to inspect the weapons. He encounters Millie, who threatens him with a revolver, then confesses her love for him and invites him to Rathblane, her country house in the Wicklow Mountains. Shocked, he runs away.

Andrew asks Frances to marry him, and is surprised and devastated when she refuses. He bikes to Rathblane to meet Millie for tea alone, having been invited along with Frances earlier in the week before his proposal was refused. During tea, the engagement ring falls out of his pocket and he bursts into tears. Millie guesses that Frances has rejected him. Millie kisses him and offers to initiate him sexually, but he refuses her offer and leaves.

Pat and Cathal are bitterly disappointed on Saturday when the insurrection is cancelled. In despair, Pat goes to Rathblane on Saturday night, and finds that Millie is already in bed with Andrew. He rushes out of the house, just as Christopher is arriving unexpectedly. Millie tells Christopher that she will not marry him after all, and that she has seduced Andrew and is in love with Pat. Later, it is revealed that Barney was also present at Rathblane, eavesdropping on all the conversations.

On Monday morning Andrew goes to Pat's house, unaware that the insurrection has been rescheduled for that day. Millie also shows up at Pat's house, and helps Pat take Andrew prisoner. They leave him handcuffed to Cathal in order to keep Cathal out of the fighting. Frances and Christopher, aware that fighting is going to take place that day, are looking for Pat at his house, finding Andrew and Cathal and freeing them just as the insurrection is starting. The novel ends with Andrew and Cathal observing the beginning of the rising in front of the General Post Office. An epilogue set in 1938 briefly describes the later lives and deaths of several of the protagonists.

== Major themes ==
The Red and the Green is the only historical novel by Iris Murdoch. Murdoch, though born in Dublin to Protestant parents, left Ireland as an infant and spent her life in England. She undertook extensive research into Irish history in preparation for writing the novel. There is considerable debate and discussion about Irish history and nationalist politics throughout the novel, chiefly carried on by Christopher Bellman and Pat and Cathal Dumay. Murdoch does not show an obvious political bias, but the book leans toward "the liberal Irish patriotism of the Anglo-Irish".

Incest is an important theme in the novel, and a common topic in Murdoch's fiction, in which a "quasi-incestuous competition of members of one family for a single beloved is ubiquitous" as are actual incestuous relationships. The baffling complexity of Andrew's family, a source of pride for his mother, is characterized by Millie as "practically incestuous". Besides going to bed with Andrew, who calls her "Aunt Millie", and trying to seduce her nephew Pat, she claims to have had a sexual relationship with her half brother, Andrew's father.

Sexual initiation is one of the themes of the novel. Both Pat and Andrew are virgins who feel "a fear of sex and a fixation on long-suffering mothers", which the critic Declan Kiberd notes is a "complex of attitudes which was by the 1960s being recognized as a pathology".

The novel has been characterized as part of Murdoch's "romantic phase" in which she was concerned with "the responsibilities, impositions and ties of marriage, or, in the case of The Red and the Green, of religious vocation". In this case Barney Drumm, while pining for Millie and resenting his virtuous wife Kathleen, is unable to give up his dream of a religious calling, and feels himself to be "by vocation a failed priest". Several chapters are devoted to Barney's religious crises, in which he wrestles with his feelings of guilt and ineffectually resolves to redeem himself.

== Reception ==
The Red and the Green was widely reviewed in Ireland, Great Britain, the United States and elsewhere. The reviews were mixed, with several critics finding that the "bedroom farce aspect" centred on Millie was "fatal to the book". Christopher Ricks wrote in the New Statesman that Murdoch's attempt to "combine a flatly faithful account of what happened in Dublin in 1916 with a love-imbroglio" showed "honourable and gigantic ambition" but resulted in a failed novel in which the "sexual permutation game both withers and demeans Irish history". Ricks argued that her "clockwork" characters and contrived plot resulted in fiction that failed to live up to the demands of her own theories of literature.

In the New York Times, John Bowen also characterized The Red and the Green as a "mechanical novel" in which "contrivance is piled on contrivance", in a manner unworthy of "a novelist of this stature". Another New York Times reviewer disagreed, calling The Red and the Green a "brilliant and entertaining" novel with a "magnificently wayward heroine" in Millie Kinnard and a "style that somehow blends the methods of Sartre and Stendhal". The Time reviewer was unimpressed by the novel, calling it "neither her best book nor her worst". The review praised her descriptive writing but called her characters "sexually confused, tortured by unexplained feelings of guilt, and totally ineffectual and unbelievable as human beings".

Murdoch's biographer Peter J. Conradi notes that the Irish reviews were "generally good", including one by Seán Ó Faoláin in the Irish Times. Benedict Kiely recommended it to American readers as a guidebook to "the English and the Irish" characters and praised Murdoch's ability to discriminate, "with scholastic precision ... between English rain and Irish rain".
