= The Sea, the Sea =

Book by Iris Murdoch

- Cover of the first edition
- Author: Iris Murdoch
- Cover artist: Hokusai
- Language: English
- Genre: philosophical novel
- Publisher: Chatto & Windus
- Publication date: 1978
- Publication place: United Kingdom
- Media type: Print (Hardcover and Paperback)
- Pages: 502 pp
- ISBN: 0-670-62651-1
- OCLC: 4136290
- Dewey Decimal: 823/.9/14
- LC Class: PZ4.M974 Sd PR6063.U7

The Sea, the Sea is a 1978 novel by British Irish writer Iris Murdoch. It was the recipient of the 1978 Booker Prize.

== Plot ==
Charles Arrowby, a successful London theatre director, has decided to withdraw from the world and write his memoirs in a tower-like house by the sea. While there, he sees what he believes to be a sea monster and encounters his first love, Mary Hartley Fitch, whom he has not seen since his love affair with her as an adolescent. Although she is almost unrecognisable in old age, he becomes obsessed with her, idealising his former relationship with her and attempting to persuade her to elope with him.

Arrowby stalks Mary (whom he calls by her childhood name "Hartley") and eventually kidnaps her, convinced that he is saving her from an abusive marriage. Meanwhile, Arrowby is visited by a series of friends and ex-lovers from the theatre world as well as his cousin James, a retired intelligence officer with an interest in Eastern philosophy, who tries to convince him that he is acting egoistically. To win Hartley, Arrowby tries to forge a connection with her estranged adopted son Titus.

Events escalate after Arrowby releases Hartley: he is pushed from behind into a dangerous pool called Minn's Cauldron, but is saved by James. The effort leaves James too weak to rescue Titus, who drowns in the ocean. Over tea, Hartley and her husband inform Arrbowby that they are moving to Australia. In a postscript, Charles narrates the fates of his cousin and his friends from the theatre.

== Title ==
Iris Murdoch's biographer Peter J. Conradi gives Xenophon as the ultimate source of the title. According to Xenophon's Anabasis, "The Sea! The Sea!" (Thalatta! Thalatta!) was the shout of exultation given by the 10,000 Greeks escaping from a battle in Persia in 401 BC when they caught sight of the Black Sea from Mount Theches in Trebizond and realised they were saved from death. Conradi states that the direct source of the title is Paul Valéry's poem Le Cimetière Marin (The Graveyard by the Sea). A line in the poem's first stanza quotes the Greeks' shouts: "La mer, la mer, toujours recommencée" (the sea, the sea, forever restarting). Murdoch refers to the poem in several of her books, and this stanza appears in full at the end of chapter 4 in her 1963 novel The Unicorn.

== Dedication ==
The work is dedicated to the archaeologist and academic Rosemary Cramp, to whom Murdoch was tutor at St Anne's.

== Adaptations ==
A four-part adaptation of The Sea, the Sea by Richard Crane, directed by Faynia Williams appeared as the Classic Serial on BBC Radio 3 in 1993. The actors included John Wood as Charles Arrowby, Joyce Redman as Hartley Fitch, with Siân Phillips, Sam Crane & Peter Kelly. Episode 3 included an interview with Iris Murdoch.

A two-part adaptation of The Sea, the Sea by Robin Brooks appeared on BBC Radio 4 in August 2015. The actors included Jeremy Irons as Charles Arrowby, Maggie Steed as Hartley Fitch, and Simon Williams as James Arrowby.

== Awards ==
The book won Murdoch the 1978 Booker Prize. In 2022, the novel was included on the "Big Jubilee Read" list of 70 books by Commonwealth authors, selected to celebrate the Platinum Jubilee of Elizabeth II.
