= Green Knight (disambiguation) =

The Green Knight is a figure in Arthurian romance.

Green Knight or The Green Knight may also refer to:

== Arts and literature ==
- The Green Knight (fairy tale), a Danish fairy tale
- The Green Knight (film), a 2021 film adaptation of Sir Gawain and the Green Knight
- The Green Knight (novel), a 1993 novel by Iris Murdoch
- The Greene Knight, a late medieval romance that tells the same story as Sir Gawain and the Green Knight
- Green Knight Publishing, a publishing company

== Other uses ==
- Green Knight, or Knight of Kerry, an Anglo-Irish hereditary knighthood
- "Green Knight", a 2009 song by Memory Tapes from the album Seek Magic
- The Green Knight, a King Arthur class railway locomotive
- The Green Knights, nickname of VMFA-121, a United States Marine Corps aircraft squadron

== See also ==
- Sir Gawain and the Green Knight, a late 14th-century Middle English chivalric romance.
