= Under the Net =

Novel by Iris Murdoch

- Cover of the first edition
- Author: Iris Murdoch
- Cover artist: Victor Ross
- Language: English
- Publisher: Chatto & Windus
- Publication date: 1954
- Publication place: United Kingdom
- Media type: Print
- Pages: 286pp

Under the Net is a 1954 novel by Iris Murdoch. It was Murdoch's first published novel. Set in London, it is the story of a struggling young writer, Jake Donaghue. Its mixture of the philosophical and the picaresque has made it one of Murdoch's most popular novels.

It is dedicated to Raymond Queneau. When Jake leaves Madge's flat in Chapter 1, two of the books he mentions taking are Murphy by Samuel Beckett, and Pierrot mon ami by Queneau, both of which are echoed in this story. The epigraph, from John Dryden's Secular Masque, refers to the way in which the main character is driven from place to place by his misunderstandings.

In 2005, the novel was chosen by Time magazine as one of the one hundred best English-language novels since 1923. The editors of Modern Library named the work as one of the greatest English-language novels of the twentieth century.

== Explanation of the title ==
The "net" in question is the net of abstraction, generalization, and theory. In Chapter 6, a quotation from Jake's book The Silencer includes the passage: "All theorizing is flight. We must be ruled by the situation itself and this is unutterably particular here. Indeed it is something to which we can never get close enough, however hard we may try as it were to crawl under the net."

Michael Wood, writing in the London Review of Books, notes that "the work’s title,... borrows and interrogates an image [of Newtonian mechanics] from Wittgenstein's Tractatus." Peter J. Conradi, in his 2001 biography of Iris Murdoch, specifies that "the title alludes to Wittgenstein’s Tractatus, 6, 341, the net of discourse behind which the world's particulars hide, which can separate us from our world, yet simultaneously connect us." According to Conradi, Hugo Belfounder is "a portrait of Wittgenstein's star pupil from 1937, Yorick Smythies."

== Plot summary ==
In this lightly comic novel about work, love, wealth and fame the main character is Jake Donaghue, a struggling writer and translator. He seeks to improve his circumstances and make up for past mistakes by reconnecting with his old acquaintance Hugo Belfounder, a mild mannered and soft-spoken philosopher.

Jake, a shameless mooch and hack-writer—now homeless and out of other solid options—tracks down his ex-girlfriend, Anna Quentin, and her elegant sister, an actress named Sadie. He also reacquaints himself with Hugo, whose philosophy Jake had long ago presumptuously tried to decipher and interpret to his own liking. The plot develops through a series of adventures involving Jake and his offbeat minion, Finn. From the kidnapping of a movie-star canine to the staging of a political riot on a film set, Jake attempts to discover and incorporate Hugo's abstruse philosophies in real life situations. Berated yet enlightened, Jake's aspirations to become a true writer/philosopher may at last be at hand.

=== Chapters 1–5: Thrown out ===
Jake Donaghue has just arrived back in London from a trip to France. Finn, a distant relative who is so obliging that he is sometimes mistaken for a servant, tells Jake that they are being thrown out of Madge's house, where they have been living rent-free for eighteen months. A conversation with Madge reveals that they are being moved to make way for her new lover, the rich bookmaker Sammy Starfield.

He goes with his suitcase to the cat-filled corner shop of Mrs Tinckham to check he has all his manuscripts and figure out where to live. Only one manuscript is missing: his translation of Le Rossignol de Bois, a novel by Jean-Pierre Breteuil. It is a mediocre work which he has done for money. He thinks of an old friend, a philosopher named Dave Gellman, and goes to his flat. A political meeting is being held there, and Dave is dismissive, but allows him to leave his suitcase. Finn suggests that he ask Anna Quentin, (a singer he once fell in love with) for help.

Jake has not seen Anna for several years. He eventually tracks her down to the Riverside Miming Theatre, on Hammersmith Mall, and finds her in a prop room "like a vast toy shop". She is happy to see him, but somewhat uncomfortable when he asks about her new project, involving mime. She suggests that he ask her film-star sister, Sadie, for help. After she leaves he spends the night sleeping in the prop room.

The next morning Jake goes to Welbeck Street to look for Sadie, and learns that she is at her Mayfair hairdresser. He spruces himself up, and goes to talk to her. She is very happy to see him there, and asks him to look after her flat while she hides from an admirer named Hugo Belfounder, a fireworks manufacturer who now owns a film studio.

It so happens that Hugo was a former friend of Jake's. They had met long ago as fellow participants in a cold-cure experiment, and had had long philosophical discussions which Jake, without Hugo's knowledge, had turned into a book called The Silencer. Because Hugo believed that language was corrupt, Jake felt that creation of the book was a kind of betrayal, and had unilaterally broken off the friendship after its publication, not wishing to face Hugo's anger.

Jake goes back to Madge's to fetch his radio, and finds Sammy there. Jake is prepared to fight, but the bookmaker is friendly and even offers him money to make up for having disrupted his life. This leads to a series of bets being placed by phone; they win £633 10s, and Sammy promises to send him a cheque for that amount.

=== Chapters 6–10: Anna and Hugo ===
Jake goes to Sadie's flat to begin housesitting and is surprised to see a copy of The Silencer on a bookshelf, wondering whether Hugo had given it to her. His pleasure in the flat's luxury is soon destroyed: firstly by a call from Hugo, asking for Miss Quentin (he hangs up when he hears Jake), and secondly by the discovery that he has been deliberately locked in. He calls from the window to his friends, Dave and Finn, who pick the lock and rescue him. Jake resolves to find Hugo, who he thinks must love Anna, and must have given her the idea for the mime theatre.

The three men take a taxi to Holborn Viaduct. They find Hugo's door open, and a note left saying "Gone to the pub". This begins a pub crawl; they do not find Hugo, but get very drunk. At the Skinners' Arms, they are joined by Lefty Todd, a political activist. After Lefty subjects Jake to a kind of Socialist catechism, they go for a walk, and all but Dave have a swim in the Thames. The next morning, Dave belatedly hands Jake a letter from Anna; she wants to see him as soon as possible. He rushes to the Riverside Theatre, but everything has been packed up, and she is gone. Devastated, he takes a ride in the lorry carrying away the contents of the prop room.

Jake goes back to Sadie's flat to purloin her copy of The Silencer, but on approaching her door he overhears a conversation between her and Sammy about his most recent translation. His prolonged eavesdropping attracts the puzzled attention of neighbours, but he manages to deduce that Sadie and Sammy are planning to use his translation of Le Rossignol de Bois as the basis of a film proposal, and that they are not planning to recompense him for its use. He is furious.

=== Chapters 11–13: Mister Mars ===
With the help of Finn, Jake breaks into Sammy's flat in Chelsea to take the typescript, but they cannot find it; instead, on the spur of the moment, Jake decides to kidnap Sammy's filmstar dog, an Alsatian named Mr Mars, for the purposes of blackmail. They cannot open the dog's cage, and so with great difficulty they carry the whole cage away and file through the bars to get the dog out. A brief newspaper article reveals to Jake that Anna is travelling to Hollywood, via Paris.

Accompanied by Mr Mars, Jake's search for Hugo takes him to Bounty Belfounder Studio, in South London. A huge crowd has gathered on a film set of Ancient Rome; they are listening to a political speech delivered by Lefty Todd. It is the first time in years that Jake has seen Hugo, and he drags him away to talk to him, but the sudden arrival of the United Nationalists causes a riot, and they have to run. Their attempts to escape the violence, which involve the improvised use of explosives, cause the collapse of the set. When the police arrive and announce that "no-one is to leave", Jake manages to evade questioning by telling Mr Mars to play dead, and carrying him out in his arms, supposedly to find a vet.

Jake has to walk all the way back, and spends the night sleeping on a bench. On arriving back at Dave's he finds the cheque from Sammy for £600. Wondering what to do with Mr Mars, Jake asks Dave for help in drafting a blackmail letter, and after much discussion they decide to demand £100. Two telegrams arrive from Madge, bearing a job offer in Paris and an order of £30 for travel expenses. But Dave has to tell Jake that Sammy has cancelled the huge cheque. In dismay, they together decide to pool £50 for a bet on Lyrebird; then Jake leaves for France.

=== Chapters 14–16: Paris ===
In Paris, Jake is amazed to discover that Jean-Pierre Breteuil's latest novel, Nous les Vainqueurs, has won the Prix Goncourt, and having dismissed Breteuil's work for so long he is amazed and envious. Madge's offer turns out to be a kind of film industry sinecure, and he finds himself refusing it with distaste for reasons that he cannot explain.

He realises that it is Bastille Day, and he wanders the city for hours in a daze. In the evening, he is watching fireworks when he sees Anna. He tries to follow her, but the crowd impedes him. He nearly catches up with her in a park, after she leaves her shoes to walk barefoot on the grass. But he briefly loses sight of her, and the woman he accosts is not her.

Jake returns to London the next morning to find that Lyrebird has won at long odds, 20–1. Finn has taken his share of the money and disappeared. Several torpid days of inactivity follow, to the despair of Dave.

=== Chapters 17–20: The hospital ===
Jake takes a job as an orderly at a hospital. When Hugo is admitted (he has been hit in the head with a brick at a political meeting), Jake sees his chance for a serious conversation with his old friend. But as an orderly he is strongly discouraged from talking to patients, and he decides to come back in the middle of the night. He leaves the window of a store-room open.

With an immensity of pains, Jake succeeds in reaching Hugo's room shortly after one in the morning. The conversation is not at all what he expected: Hugo is not at all angry with Jake, and it turns out that while Anna is indeed besotted with Hugo, Hugo himself is in love with Sadie, and Sadie with Jake—not a love triangle, but a one-way love diamond. Hugo demands that Jake help him escape. Jake does so, but they are seen by the hostile porter, Stitch, and Jake knows that he has lost his job.

When Jake next goes to Hugo's flat, he finds that Hugo has gone, leaving all he owns to Lefty and his political party. At Mrs Tinckham's, he reads letters from Finn and Sadie. Finn has gone back to Ireland, as he always said he would; Sadie is suggesting he buy Mr Mars for £700, and although this puts Jake back at square one financially, he decides it is the only possible course of action. With Mrs Tinckham, he listens to Anna singing on the radio, and having made his peace with Hugo and with The Silencer he realises that his literary career is just beginning.

== Characters ==
- James Donaghue (Jake), a writer and translator in his early thirties
- Peter O'Finney (Finn), a distant cousin
- Magdalen Casement (Madge), a typist living on Earls Court Road
- Samuel Starfield (Sammy), a wealthy bookmaker
- Mrs Tinckham, a chain-smoking, cat-loving shopkeeper near Charlotte Street
- Dave Gellman, a Jewish anti-Metaphysical philosopher, living on Goldhawk Road
- Lefty Todd, leader of the New Independent Socialist Party
- Anna Quentin, a singer
- Sadie Quentin, a film star
- Hugo Belfounder, a fireworks manufacturer and film magnate
- Ward Matron; Sister Piddingham; Stitch, a hospital porter
- Mister Mars, a 14-year-old Alsatian, the star of many popular animal movies
- Jean-Pierre Breteuil, a French writer whose novels include:
  - Le Rossignol de Bois ("The Wooden Nightingale")
  - Les Pierres de l'Amour ("Stones of Love")
  - Nous les Vainqueurs ("We the Victors")
- Homer K. Pringsheim (H.K.), an American film magnate
