= An Accidental Man =

Novel by Iris Murdoch

- First English edition cover
- Author: Iris Murdoch
- Cover artist: John Sergeant
- Language: English
- Publisher: Chatto & Windus
- Publication date: 1971
- Publication place: United Kingdom
- Media type: Print (Hardcover)
- Pages: 376
- ISBN: 9780701118211
- OCLC: 713954823

An Accidental Man is a novel by Iris Murdoch, which was published in 1971. It was her fourteenth novel.

The complex story is set in London and involves a large number of characters, many of whom are related to each other by family or marriage. The "accidental man" is the hapless but charming Austin Gibson Grey, whose actions drive much of the plot. His long-estranged wealthy older brother, recently retired to England after a career spent abroad, is drawn into covering up Austin's misdeeds and accidents. A second plot line involves Ludwig Leferrier, a young American academic who has resolved to stay in England in order to avoid the draft, but struggles with his decision throughout the book.

The book's main moral theme is the individual's responsibility to others. Coincidence and accident play a major role in the plot, in which the efforts of supposedly well-meaning characters to help each other often fail, while others fail to act when they could be of help. An Accidental Man was generally well received by contemporary reviewers, who viewed it as mainly a comic novel.

== Plot ==
The novel is set in London. The plot involves a large number of characters who are related to each other by family or acquaintance. The "accidental man" of the title is Austin Gibson Grey, a middle-aged man who has lost his job and is living apart from his mentally fragile second wife Dorina. Austin's older brother, Sir Matthew Gibson Grey, has returned to London after a successful diplomatic career. The two brothers have been estranged for many years. Austin blames his brother for having injured him when they were children, leaving him with a deformed right hand, and for having had an affair with his first wife, both of which accusations Matthew denies. Matthew tries to reconcile with his brother, whose actions and accidents drive much of the plot.

The novel begins with the engagement of Ludwig Leferrier, a young American historian, to Gracie, the daughter of George and Clara Tisbourne. Ludwig has decided to remain in England after a scholarship year in Oxford, rather than return to the United States. He is opposed to the Vietnam War and expects to be arrested for having avoided the draft if he goes home. Ludwig gets a job teaching at an Oxford college. Gracie's wealthy grandmother dies and leaves all her property to Gracie, despite the fact that her daughter Charlotte, Clara's sister, had lived with her and looked after her during her illness. During the course of the novel Ludwig begins to question his relationship with Gracie, who does not share his intellectual and moral seriousness, and who discourages him from trying to help Dorina and Charlotte. He also doubts his own motivation for staying in England.

Other important characters include Austin's son Garth, who had been Ludwig's friend as a student at Harvard, and who also returns to London at the outset of the novel; Dorina's sister (and Matthew's lover) Mavis, a social worker who has lost her religious faith; and Mitzi Ricardo, a former star athlete whose career was ended by a freak accident and who works as a typist. Austin, with whom she is unrequitedly in love, rents a room in Mitzi's house.

Austin, driving Matthew's car while drunk, hits and kills a child. With Matthew's help, Austin manages to escape police suspicion, but the child's father starts blackmailing him. In an altercation in Austin's room Austin hits him on the head, apparently killing him, and calls on Matthew, who helps him to make the death look like an accident before calling the police. In fact, the man is not dead, but suffers brain damage and memory loss, so the crime is undetected.

Both Mitzi and Charlotte attempt suicide by taking overdoses of sleeping pills, but both are rescued in time and are taken to recover in the same hospital ward. They end up living together in a cottage in the country. Austin's wife Dorina, having left Mavis's house where she had been staying, goes into hiding in a hotel, where she dies accidentally when an electric heater falls into her bathtub. Shortly before her death she and Ludwig had seen each other in the street, but ignored each other. Ludwig is remorseful about his failure to approach her and feels that his reticence may have contributed to her death.

Ludwig decides to break off his engagement with Gracie and return home, where he may be drafted or arrested. At the end of the novel he is on his way to the United States, accompanied by Matthew, who had helped him make the decision to go back. Garth, who has become a successful novelist, marries Gracie, while Austin starts a new relationship with his brother's abandoned lover Mavis.

== Narrative structure ==
The novel, with its complicated plot and large number of characters, is divided into 74 relatively short sections rather than named or numbered chapters, and is "openly, often almost ramblingly narrated". The action is punctuated by several collections of letters in which the correspondents sometimes comment on the plot, and sometimes relate their own actions outside the scope of the novel. Some of the letter writers, including Gracie's brother Patrick and Ludwig's colleague Andrew, do not appear in the main narrative but are present at one or more of three large parties which bring together most of the main characters. The party scenes are not narrated but consist of unattributed snatches of conversation. The letter sections and party scenes constitute a mostly comic "shadow novel".

== Major themes ==
Accident is a major theme of the novel, which contains many coincidences and accidental occurrences, including several deaths. Austin calls himself an "accidental man" and sees himself always as a victim of other people and of his own bad luck. Late in the novel Matthew reflects on Austin's "contamination" of Mavis, and concedes that "Austin had not really done this "on purpose"", but that it was " like so many other things in the story, an accident." Accident, in the form of the many coincidences in the plot, is also the source of much of novel's humour.

The central moral theme of the novel is the individual's responsibility to others, as exemplified by the parable of the Good Samaritan. Before the action of the novel, two of the characters happened to witness events that evoke the parable. Garth saw a man being knifed on a New York City street and did not act, even though the man saw him and appealed for help. Matthew, observing a street protest in Moscow, saw another passerby joining the protesters in solidarity shortly before the police came and arrested them all. These events, to which their thoughts often turn, have had a profound effect on their views of themselves as moral agents. Ludwig is tormented throughout the novel by his decision to marry Gracie and stay in England, while his parents plead with him to return to the United States. The accidental death of Dorina just after he has passed her in the street without acknowledgement awakens him to his complicity with Gracie's uncharitable attitudes and leads to the discussions with Matthew which result in Ludwig's going home. However, Austin's chronic bad luck, which appears to be "an infectious moral flaw", calls into question the universality of the Good Samaritan's message of helping the unlucky.

== Literary significance and reception ==
An Accidental Man, Iris Murdoch's fourteenth novel, was widely reviewed in Great Britain and elsewhere. It was generally viewed as primarily a comic novel. The Times called it "one of her good books and certainly one of her funniest". In The New York Times Anatole Broyard wrote that with An Accidental Man Iris Murdoch had "become, at last, a complete novelist", in that she had succeeded in making her characters believable. This is contrasted with earlier, more tightly plotted novels, in which her characters sometimes seemed to be unconvincing "puppets in a metaphysical Punch and Judy show". The Toronto Globe and Mail reviewer also noted Murdoch's ability to create characters who believably engage in moral and philosophical thinking, singling out Ludwig's moral struggle as particularly well done. Nora Sayre, in The New York Times Book Review, remarked on the individuality of the characters and their inability to "help or simply influence one another", noting the absence of "all-powerful sorcerers". This is a reference to the charismatic manipulator type who appears in some of Murdoch's earlier books. She judged the novel "fairly difficult" but "better written than many of its predecessors". Joyce Carol Oates, on the other hand, found the length and complexity of the novel excessive, and the relationships among the characters "relentlessly obscure".

Literary scholars have also viewed An Accidental Man as a comic novel, and in various ways as a departure from Murdoch's earlier work. In his study of Iris Murdoch's fiction, Peter J. Conradi calls An Accidental Man "marvellous" for its combination of "moral passion and idealism" with "absence of illusion and moral skepticism", which results in an dryly ironic tone reminiscent of Henry James's The Awkward Age. Angela Hague describes the novel as a "brittle comedy of manners" and says that Murdoch's purpose was to create a "Dickensian sweep of characters". Frank Baldanza compares An Accidental Man with Murdoch's previous novel A Fairly Honourable Defeat. Both display "trenchant irony" about the ineffectuality of conventionally good and well-meaning characters. In the earlier novel they were frustrated by the schemes of a demonic individual, while An Accidental Man impersonal chance takes on this role. In her study of Murdoch's fiction Hilda Spear includes it in a group of novels that are "deeply concerned with the problems of Good and Evil". She sees the structure of the novel, with its loose narration interspersed with letter sections, as both a major departure for Murdoch and evidence of her "genuine narrative skills".
