= The Bell (TV series) =

- Genre: Drama
- Based on: The Bell by Iris Murdoch
- Written by: Reg Gadney
- Directed by: Barry Davis
- Starring: Ian Holm; Edward Hardwicke; Tessa Peake-Jones
- Composer: Marc Wilkinson
- Country of origin: United Kingdom
- Original language: English
- No. of series: 1
- No. of episodes: 4

Production
- Producer: Jonathan Powell
- Running time: 50 minutes
- Production company: BBC

Original release
- Network: BBC Two
- Release: 13 January – 3 February 1982

The Bell is a 1982 British television drama series which originally aired on BBC 2. It is an adaptation of the 1958 novel of the same title by Iris Murdoch.

== Cast ==
- Rowena Cooper as Mrs. Mark
- Kenneth Cranham as Nick Fawley
- Edward Hardwicke as Peter Topglass
- Patricia Heneghan as Sister Ursula
- Ian Holm as Michael Meade
- Michael Maloney as Toby Gashe
- Derrick O'Connor as Noel Spens
- Tessa Peake-Jones as Dora Greenfield
- Bryan Pringle as Patchway
- William Simons as Mark Strafford
- Trudie Styler as Catherine Fawley
- Gareth Thomas as James Tayper Pace
- James Warwick as Paul Greenfield
- Tim Wylton as Fr. Bob Joyce
- Rachel Kempson as Abbess
- Kenny Baker as Jazz group member
- Patricia Donovan as Mother Clare
- Rex Holdsworth as Station porter
- Finnuala O'Shannon as 1st Nun
- Richard Pearson as Bishop

== Bibliography ==
- Baskin, Ellen. Serials on British Television, 1950-1994. Scolar Press, 1996. ISBN 978-1-85928-015-7.
