= Lectures and Conversations on Aesthetics, Psychology, and Religious Belief =

Lectures by Ludwig Wittgenstein

Lectures and Conversations on Aesthetics, Psychology, and Religious Belief (German: Vorlesungen und Gespräche über Ästhetik, Psychoanalyse und religiösen Glauben) is a series of notes transcribed by Yorick Smythies, Rush Rhees, and James Taylor from assorted lectures by Ludwig Wittgenstein, and published in 1966. The lectures, at which Casimir Lewy was present, contain Wittgenstein's thoughts about aesthetics and religion, alongside a critique of psychoanalysis. Wittgensteinian fideism originates from the remarks in the Lectures. Eberhard Bubser, in the introduction, of the German edition states that: "Wittgenstein would surely have not approved this release [...]" ("Wittgenstein hätte diese Ausgabe bestimmt nicht gebilligt [...]").

== Lectures on Aesthetics ==
One question Wittgenstein raises in his Lectures on Aesthetics is how we learn to use and recognize the words used to make an aesthetic judgment, such as "beautiful" ("schön") or "nice" or ("fein"). He suggests that these words are firstly and often used like interjections or gestures. Wittgenstein also notes that we seldom use these words in everyday language to make aesthetic judgments, but rather use words like "right" ("richtig") or "correct" ("korrekt"). With regard to aesthetic pleasures, he also names a question that is recently under debate in aesthetics: How are distinctly aesthetic pleasures different from more ordinary pleasures? He makes a point in stating that "One uses the same term in both cases [...]" (" Man gebraucht in beiden Fällen [...] dasselbe Wort").

A recurring theme in these lectures is also Wittgenstein's firm rejection of the possibility that psychology may explain aesthetic experiences or judgments. This opinion is based on Wittgenstein's view that psychological (behaviorist) experiments would generate results based on mere descriptions of behavior and generalizations across large numbers of observers.

== Lectures on Religious Belief ==
In his Lectures on Religious Belief (Vorlesungen über den religiösen Glauben), Wittgenstein argues, among other things, that superficial grammatical similarities in the forms of both religious and factual statements mislead us into believing that they are fundamentally identical states of "belief." This grammatical similarity, Wittgenstein argues, is merely a parallel expression of drastically different processes. "The expression of belief", Wittgenstein notes, "may play an absolutely minor role."

== See also ==
- Remarks on the Philosophy of Psychology
- Remarks on Frazer's Golden Bough
