= The Italian Girl =

Book by Iris Murdoch

- Cover of the first edition
- Author: Iris Murdoch
- Cover artist: Reynolds Stone
- Language: English
- Publisher: Chatto and Windus
- Publication date: 1964
- Publication place: United Kingdom
- Media type: Print (Hardcover and Paperback)
- Pages: 224 pp
- OCLC: 2206219

The Italian Girl is a 1964 novel by Iris Murdoch.

== Plot introduction ==
Edmund has escaped from his family into a lonely life. Returning for his mother's funeral he finds himself involved in the same awful problems, together with some new ones. He also rediscovers the eternal family servant, the ever-changing "Italian girl".

== Plot summary ==
Edmund Narraway returns to his family home, an old rectory in the north of England, for the cremation of his mother, Lydia. His brother, Otto, probably drunk, starts giggling during the service, and has to be taken outside. Edmund is disgusted rather than scandalised, yet he immediately finds himself fascinated by Otto's daughter Flora, his own niece, who is now a teenager and, for the first time since Edmund last saw her, sexually mature. After the service Isabel, Otto's apparently neurotic wife, attempts to involve Edmund in her small and frustrated life. He at first refuses. When Edmund later talks to his self-pitying brother, he detects evidence of a sexual tension between Otto and his apprentice David Levkin. Isabel, Otto and Flora all implore Edmund to stay and help them, each for a different reason. In each case, Edmund seems at first untempted, reluctant to get involved, and aware of his own impotence against their troubles. It is finally Flora who gives Edmund a real reason, or excuse, to stay. She confides in him that she is pregnant by another student, and has only him to rely on for assistance. One by one, each character in the house manages to enveigle Edmund in a series of confessions, exposés and almost farcical in flagrante delicto discoveries. Edmund, though sexually aloof and anodyne now seems, somewhat contradictorily, highly prone to getting involved and seeing himself as an integral part of everyone else's problem, if not the means to a solution. He cuts a slightly preposterous and contemptible figure, ever more so as each character, led by David Levkin and Flora, respectively devilish and vituperative, make evident their disgust for him.

Midway through the story we have learnt that Otto is having an affair with Elsa, David's sister; Isabel and her daughter Flora have both had affairs with David, and it is he who made Flora pregnant; 'Maggie', the Italian girl, whose actual name is Maria Magistretti and who was nursemaid to Otto and Edmund, had been having a lesbian affair with Lydia, their recently deceased mother and, it transpires, she is the sole beneficiary of Lydia's will.

After all these 'secret' relationships have been revealed, Otto's response is to send David and Elsa Levkin packing. Elsa, in despair, reacts by setting fire to herself and the house. She dies, the house survives. At this surprising turn of events Otto and Edmund now seem reconciled, perhaps in misery, perhaps in astonishment. Similarly, Otto and David act civilised towards each other, and Edmund and David begin to talk honestly and respectfully to each other for the first time. David departs, leaving instructions for Elsa's funeral.

The fire and Elsa's death seem to have had a cathartic effect on everyone. Isabel finds her independence and leaves Otto. She joyfully announces that she too is pregnant by David. Flora, who ran away from home at the climax now returns to look after her rather helpless father Otto. Maggie generously agrees to split the inheritance equally with Edmund and Otto, and allows Otto to keep the house. The fire damage, incidentally, is all covered by insurance.

To crest this unexpected wave of redemption Edmund discovers that he has always actually been in love with Maria and she, conveniently, has always been in love with him. The book closes with them preparing to travel by car to Rome.

== Characters in "The Italian Girl" ==
- Edmund Narraway – (the narrator) abstemious, puritan, fastidious and bloodless. Edmund is an engraver who lives alone in a flat somewhere in the south of England. He has had moderate success in his career, but has not come close to rivalling his more famous and more talented father, John Narraway, who has been dead for several years when the story begins. At the end of the book he awakens to long-concealed emotions.
- Otto Narraway – (Edmund's brother) self-pitying, dissolute, desolate and addictive. Otto is a sculptor and stonemason whose self-destructive tendencies have probably helped to ruin his career. He is now dependent on the income he derives from carving gravestones for the local village, though even this is not enough to sustain him. He lives in tense counterpoise with his mother, wife and daughter in the family home.
- Isabel Narraway – (Otto's wife) desperate, neurotic, depressed and manipulative. Isabel was resented and psychologically tortured by Lydia Narraway, her mother-in-law, and appears to have been beaten senseless by the punishment. She eventually overcomes this, regains independence and is infused by optimism.
- Flora Narraway – (Otto's daughter) tempestuous, erotic, haughty and vicious. Flora has recently started attending a local technical college, studying textile design, for which she has 'a small talent'. She matures and learns to accept responsibility for both herself and others.
- Maria Magistretti 'Maggie' – watchful, cagy, removed and circumspect. Maggie is the last in a long line of interchangeable and unrecognised Italian nursemaids who were tasked with bringing up Otto and Edmund. She has stayed on, apparently sacrificing herself to the family. She harbours a secret yearning, sublimated for years, but which is finally satisfied.
- David Levkin – (Otto's apprentice) puckish, devious, amoral and provocateur. David, like Maggie, is the last in a line, in his case of thieving and untalented apprentices to Otto. He has first seduced Isabel and then, to torture her, done the same to her daughter Flora. He deceives for his own perverse sense of pleasure, but finally is shocked into maturity.
- Elsa Levkin – (David's sister) promiscuous, earthy, and apparently insane and delusional. Elsa appears to be an irrational being driven by sensuous appetites and curiously intense and imaginative self-delusions. Much of this is David's manipulation of others' perceptions of her. We never quite know what drives Elsa, other than a profound despair at the loss of Otto.

== Major themes ==
The major theme of The Italian Girl is that of resolution and redemption. The final chapters of the book are so heavily steeped in this theme that they have the flavour of a morality play. Good replaces evil. Solutions appear to be problems, and characters develop extra dimensions that enable them to cope, perhaps even to thrive. Secrets are revealed, honesty pervades. A claustrophobic convergence is replaced by divergence and optimism. Characters even set off to romantic or familiar destinations.

== Adaptations ==
The Italian Girl was adapted for the stage by James Saunders, in collaboration with Iris Murdoch. It was first performed at the Bristol Old Vic on 29 November 1967, directed by Val May. The same production opened on 1 February 1968 at Wyndham's Theatre in London's West End, where it ran for 315 performances.

In March 2019, the London-based production company Rebel Republic Films announced that it had optioned The Italian Girl and was developing a screenplay based on the book.
