= An Unofficial Rose =

Novel by Iris Murdoch

- First English edition cover
- Author: Iris Murdoch
- Cover artist: T. Ritchie
- Language: English
- Publisher: Chatto & Windus
- Publication date: 1962
- Publication place: United Kingdom
- Media type: Print (Hardcover)
- Pages: 348
- OCLC: 460526258

An Unofficial Rose is a novel by Iris Murdoch. Published in 1962, it was her sixth novel.

== Plot ==
The novel begins with the funeral of Fanny Peronett, the wife of Hugh Peronett. Hugh is a retired civil servant whose son Randall owns a successful rose nursery near Romney Marsh. Randall and his wife Ann have a fourteen-year-old daughter, Miranda. Randall is having an affair in London with Lindsay Rimmer, a young woman who is the secretary and companion of Emma Sands, a detective novelist with whom Hugh had had an affair twenty five years earlier.

Randall is determined to leave Ann for Lindsay, and asks his father for financial help. Hugh complies by selling a valuable painting and giving the proceeds to Randall. Randall takes Lindsay off to Italy, and asks his wife for a divorce. For emotional and religious reasons she is reluctant to grant his request. Felix Meecham, an army officer and family friend, has been in love with Ann for years. After Randall leaves and asks Ann for a divorce, Felix declares his love and urges her to give up hoping for Randall's return. Ann falls in love with Felix, but her daughter Miranda, who is devoted to her father and is herself secretly in love with Felix, convinces her that she should not marry him. Discouraged by Ann's rejection, Felix decides to take a position in India.

Years before, Hugh had broken off his affair with Emma and returned to his wife, but Fanny's death opens up the possibility of his renewing the relationship. He visits Emma in her London flat, where she is always accompanied by Lindsay. After Lindsay's departure Hugh declares his love to Emma, but she refuses him, saying she has already hired another secretary and companion. At the end of the novel, Hugh is on his way to India for a holiday, accompanying Felix and Felix's older sister Mildred, who is in love with Hugh.

== Title ==
The novel's title and epigraph are taken from Rupert Brooke's poem The Old Vicarage, Grantchester. In the poem, which was written in Berlin in 1912, Brooke contrasts his beloved English countryside with the German city around him. The disciplined German tulips, he says, "bloom in rows", unlike the "unkempt" wild roses in England. Along with its obvious relevance to the rose nursery setting of the book, the title refers to the formlessness of Ann Peronett's character. The lack of self-assertiveness that Randall criticizes as making her "as messy and flabby and open as a bloody dogrose", is also part of what makes her a virtuous but, to some readers, a dull character.

== Major themes ==
Romantic love is a dominant theme of An Unofficial Rose, in which each of the main characters is in love with at least one of the others. In this novel most of the emotional attachments, whether or not they are reciprocated or acknowledged, have existed in some form for some time. This contrasts with some of Murdoch's other novels, in which "people implausibly fall suddenly and often disastrously in love", and lends an air of naturalism to the plot.

Freedom is another important theme. Randall is determined to free himself from his marriage to Ann, and apparently succeeds in doing so, unlike his father Hugh, who gave up Emma and stayed with Fanny. However, the question of individual freedom is complicated by the fact that the characters, while attempting to achieve their own ends, are influencing the course of other people's lives. Thus, for example, Randall finds out later that his flight with Lindsay was to some extent facilitated by Emma. In some cases, several people share responsibility for an action, without realizing it. For example, Hugh thinks the act of freeing Randall by selling his Tintoretto and giving him the money is his alone, while Mildred, who counselled Hugh to do so, thinks she is responsible.

Ann and Randall Peronett's relationship represents the tension between a virtuous or religious person and an artist, two ways of being that Murdoch often explores in her novels. In this case Ann's formlessness and passivity contrast with Randall's quest for form and his desire for decisive action. In a televised discussion with Frank Kermode in 1965, Iris Murdoch said that Ann's having a 'lack of ego" was "one way of being good".

== Literary significance and reception ==
Contemporary reviewers saw An Unofficial Rose as primarily a comic novel, describing it variously as a "tragi-comedy about the follies, miseries and ambiguities of love" or a "comedy of manners". The book's reception was generally favourable, and The New York Times included it on its list of recommended books for summer reading. The Times, on the other hand, found the characters lifeless and the style "flat-footed and undistinguished".

Literary scholars have tended to treat An Unofficial Rose within the context of Murdoch's work as a whole. Hilda Spear describes it as belonging to Murdoch's "romantic phase", in which her books were concerned with "the responsibilities, impositions and ties of marriage". It has also been analyzed in the context of Murdoch's four novels dealing with male adultery. A more philosophical approach compared Murdoch's views of freedom with those of the French existentialists, particularly Jean-Paul Sartre. The author found that An Unofficial Rose was the "most interesting of her novels for examining this facet of Anglo-French literary relations".

== Adaptations ==
An Unofficial Rose was adapted as a four-part television miniseries by Simon Raven. It appeared on BBC Two beginning on 28 December 1974. Among the cast were Maurice Denham as Hugh Peronett, John Woodvine as Randall, and Ann Bell as Ann.
