= The Good Apprentice =

Novel by Iris Murdoch

- Cover of the first edition
- Author: Iris Murdoch
- Cover artist: Tom Phillips
- Language: English
- Publisher: Chatto & Windus
- Publication date: 1985
- Publication place: United Kingdom
- Media type: Print (Hardback & Paperback)
- Pages: 522pp
- ISBN: 0-670-80940-3
- OCLC: 12549497
- Dewey Decimal: 823/.914 19
- LC Class: PR6063.U7 G6 1986

The Good Apprentice is the 22nd novel by Iris Murdoch, first published in 1985.

== Plot ==
Edward Baltram, a college student living in London, gives his best friend Mark a sandwich laced with a hallucinogenic drug for a joke. After Mark, still high, falls to his death from a window, Edward is wracked with guilt and depression — worsened by daily letters from Mark's mother cursing him as a murderer.

In search of his father, Jesse, Edward sets off for Seegard, the family home, away from the harsh reality of London. As Edward progresses through the novel, he revives somewhat, thanks to the love of his eccentric father and his extended family of supportive women. He eventually finds, however, that he must come to terms with Mark's death.

Meanwhile, Edward's stepbrother Stuart Cuno decides to give up his studies and goes in search of the "pure" life of an aesthete, to his family's bewilderment. Stuart has a close bond with thirteen-year-old Meredith, the son of Thomas and Midge McCaskerville.

While Edward seeks redemption and Stuart salvation, Midge is having an affair with her husband's best friend, Harry Cuno - stepfather to Edward and father to Stuart. Her passionate love affair comes to a head after two years when she is disgraced publicly and falls unexpectedly in love with Stuart. Left with a difficult decision, Midge turns to Edward for support.

== Awards and nominations ==
The Good Apprentice was shortlisted for the 1985 Booker Prize.
