= Something Special (short story) =

- First standalone edition
- Author: Iris Murdoch
- Language: English
- Genre: Short story
- Publisher: Chatto & Windus (standalone)
- Publication date: 1957 (1999 standalone)
- Publication place: Ireland
- Media type: Print
- Pages: 41pp
- ISBN: 0-7011-6918-4
- OCLC: 41661896
- Dewey Decimal: 823/.914 21
- LC Class: PR6063.U7 S66 1999

"Something Special" is the only published short story by Iris Murdoch. It first appeared in 1957 in a collection entitled Winter's Tales 3, and after inclusion in anthologies in Japan (1971, 1972), England (1979) and Finland (1990) it was republished separately by Chatto & Windus in 1999.

Yvonne Geary, the 24-year-old daughter of a Dublin shopkeeper, is courted by a young Jewish man, Sam Goldman, who takes her out for the night. After an unpleasant scene at a rowdy public house Sam decides to take Yvonne into his confidence.

== Publication history ==
- 1957: Winter's Tales 3, pp175–204. Macmillan, London. St Martin's Press, New York.
- 1971: Murdoch, Spark and Bowen, pp1–29. ed. Hisayasu Hirukawa. Eichosha, Tokyo.
- 1972: Modern English Stories, pp286–303. Shueisa, Tokyo.
- 1979: Women Writing: an Anthology, pp1–19. ed. Denys Val Baker. W H Allen, London.
- 1979: Best for Winter: a Selection from 25 Years of Winter's Tales, pp46–59. ed. A D Maclean. Macmillan, London.
- 1990: Something Special: Four Poems and a Story. Eurographica, Helsinki.
- 1999: Something Special. Chatto & Windus, London.
