= The Book and the Brotherhood =

Novel by Iris Murdoch

- First edition cover
- Author: Iris Murdoch
- Cover artist: Tom Phillips
- Language: English
- Publisher: Chatto & Windus
- Publication date: 1987
- Publication place: United Kingdom
- Media type: Print
- Pages: 601pp
- ISBN: 0-7011-3251-5
- OCLC: 16087541
- Dewey Decimal: 823/.914 19
- LC Class: PR6063.U7 B66 1987

The Book and the Brotherhood is the 23rd novel of Iris Murdoch, first published in 1987. Considered by some critics to be among her best novels, it is the story of a circle of Oxford University graduates in 1980s England. The eponymous book is a theoretical work on Marxism which is to be written by a member of the group. After graduating from university the friends had agreed to finance the writing of this book as a 'brotherhood' but grow uneasy as no written work is in sight and the stipend continues to be paid.

== Plot ==
David Crimond, tasked with writing the book, resurfaces at a Commemoration ball the friends attend. His sudden re-appearance induces the group to attempt resolving the untenable situation by pressing for clarification. In turn they find themselves confronted with how far removed they are from their former Marxist beliefs and their own philosophical disorientation. As Crimond promises progress in the book, his draw causes the members of the circle to plunge into chaos.

== Main characters ==
- David Crimond, who is to write the book. Born to Scottish working-class parents he met the group at Oxford and went on to become a minor leftist theorist.
- Gerard Hernshaw, member of the original group at Oxford who has just retired from a successful career in the home civil service and is de facto in charge of the 'brotherhood'.
- Jenkin Riderhood, Oxford graduate and now a recluse schoolteacher with an interest in liberation theology.
- Duncan Cambus, another Oxford graduate and former diplomat.
- Jean Kowitz, daughter of a wealthy New York banker, was an Oxford contemporary and is now in a troubled marriage with Duncan.
- Rose Curtland, heir to a minor aristocratic family and sister of a deceased friend; is now also part of the set.
- Tamar Hernshaw, Gerard's niece troubled by the financial and emotional problems of her mother.
- Gulliver Ashe, who graduated from a London college and was drawn into the group later on, is now a socially anxious unemployed writer and artist.
- Lily Boyne, born poor but comes into money through a marriage, is fascinated by Crimond and the group circling around him.

== Major themes ==
Crimond is a classic example of Murdoch's "enchanter" archetype: the enigmatic character whose charisma inspires others to devote themselves to him.

The Book and the Brotherhood joins a novel of ideas with finely-drawn characters in unusually emotionally intense relations to each other. It is notable for its detailed, wide-ranging opening scene at an Oxford ball during which every major character in the novel is introduced. The London Review of Books highlights the upper-middle class establishment background of the majority of characters and Murdoch's ability to trace the limits of this social class, while the New York Times describes the book as 'a triumphal celebration of literacy as a social bond'.

== Awards and nominations ==
The Book and the Brotherhood was shortlisted for the 1987 Booker Prize.
