= Jackson's Dilemma =

Book by Iris Murdoch

- Cover of the first edition
- Author: Iris Murdoch
- Cover artist: Liz Cooke
- Language: English
- Publisher: Chatto & Windus
- Publication date: 1995
- Publication place: United Kingdom
- Media type: Print
- Pages: 249
- ISBN: 0-7011-6511-1

Jackson's Dilemma is a novel by Iris Murdoch, published in 1995. It was Murdoch's last novel; she died four years later, on 8 February 1999.

In her final years, Murdoch was in the early stages of Alzheimer's disease, one of the symptoms of which is a reduced vocabulary and decreased word fluency. Researchers at University College London found in 2004 that the language used in Jackson's Dilemma is noticeably simpler than in her earlier works. They suggested that the novel - written in longhand, with few revisions and little room for editorial interference - offers a "unique opportunity" to study the effects of Alzheimer's on spontaneous writing, and hoped that their research could help to develop better diagnostic tests, capable of picking up on these subtle changes in cognitive ability.
