= Sartre: Romantic Rationalist =

1953 book by Iris Murdoch

- First English edition cover
- Author: Iris Murdoch
- Language: English
- Series: Studies in modern European literature and thought
- Subject: Jean-Paul Sartre
- Publisher: Bowes & Bowes
- Publication date: 1953
- Publication place: United Kingdom
- Media type: Print
- Pages: 78
- OCLC: 647083074

Sartre: Romantic Rationalist is a book by Iris Murdoch. Published in 1953 by Bowes & Bowes of Cambridge, it was Murdoch's first book and the first book about Jean-Paul Sartre's work to be published in English.

== Publication history ==
In 1950 Iris Murdoch, then a tutor of philosophy at St Anne's College, Oxford, contracted with the Cambridge publishing house Bowes & Bowes to write a short book on the French existentialists. It was to have focussed on the literary works of Sartre, Albert Camus and Simone de Beauvoir. This project was not completed, but Murdoch developed the section on Sartre into the monograph Sartre: Romantic Rationalist, which appeared in November 1953 as part of Bowes & Bowes's "Studies in modern European literature and thought" series. It was the first book devoted to the work of Sartre to be published in English, as well as being Murdoch's first published book.

The book was first published in the United States by Yale University Press, also in 1953. It was reprinted in paperback in 1967 by Collins under the Fontana Library imprint. Spanish, Turkish and Japanese editions were published in 1956, 1964 and 1968 respectively. A revised edition with a new introduction by Murdoch was published by Chatto & Windus in London in 1987 and reprinted by Penguin Books in 1989.

== Themes ==
Murdoch had met Sartre in Brussels in 1945 while she was working for the United Nations Relief and Rehabilitation Administration and was impressed by his existentialist philosophy and by the fact that he was also a novelist and playwright. In Sartre: Romantic Rationalist she took Sartre's novels as the starting point for examining his thought, which she characterized as influenced by "three post-Hegelian movements: the Marxist, the existentialist, and the phenomenological", while being "profoundly and self-consciously contemporary". As well as Nausea and the trilogy of novels making up The Roads to Freedom, she drew on his philosophical works including Being and Nothingness and What Is Literature?. Among the themes she discussed were Sartre's views of freedom, interpersonal relations, and politics. She characterized him as "more at home as a playwright than a novelist", arguing that his "interest in issues rather than people, while it may sometimes be appropriate for a dramatist is not appropriate for a novelist".

In her introduction to the new edition of Sartre: Romantic Rationalist, which appeared in 1987, Murdoch considered Sartre's writing since 1953, including the Critique of Dialectical Reason, Saint Genet, and The Family Idiot, his biography of Flaubert.

== Reception ==
Sartre: Romantic Rationalist was well received and favourably reviewed. Books Abroad called it "an interesting book", particularly welcome for attempting "an objective evaluation" of Sartre, whose followers on American university campuses seemed to see him as "the high priest of a new cult". Writing in The London Magazine, Maurice Cranston described it as "a model of intelligent exposition" in which Murdoch displayed "an uncommonly wide knowledge of continental authors as well as the sharp wits of an Oxford philosophy don".

Stuart Hampshire, Murdoch's fellow Oxford philosophy don, reviewed the book for the New Statesman and Nation. He saw her "main purpose" as being "to explain what Sartre's existentialism is, and why it has been largely ignored here, particularly by English philosophers", a task in which "she almost wholly succeeds".

Both Sissela Bok and Jay Parini reviewed the 1987 edition along with new biographies of Sartre. Bok noted that her "perspective, rooted, as was Sartre's, in philosophy and in literature" was necessary in order to understand Sartre's "role and his intellectual legacy". Similarly, Parini concluded in The Hudson Review that Murdoch "has understood Sartre better than any other critic thus far".

Tasked to write on his ethics in 1959, but having “not read a word of Sartre”, Mary Warnock, in her Memoir (2000), recalls "ruthlessly" putting the work to use and suggests that "this first of Iris’s books is both an extremely good book, and illuminating in a far more general way, throwing light not only on existentialist thinking but on Iris herself".
