= The Unicorn (novel) =

Book by Iris Murdoch

- First British edition cover
- Author: Iris Murdoch
- Cover artist: Christopher Cornford
- Language: English
- Publisher: Chatto & Windus
- Publication date: 1963
- Publication place: United Kingdom
- Media type: Print (Hardcover)
- OCLC: 695766236

The Unicorn is a novel by Iris Murdoch. Published in 1963, it was her seventh novel.

== Plot ==
The Unicorn is set in a remote area on the west coast of Ireland. The book begins with the arrival of Marian Taylor, a young English school teacher who has accepted a position as governess at an isolated country house called Gaze Castle. She is surprised to learn that there are no children at Gaze, and that she will be teaching French and Italian to the lady of the house, Hannah Crean-Smith.

Part 1 describes Marian's growing awareness of the situation at Gaze Castle, as recounted to her by other characters. Her main informant is Denis Nolan, the estate's clerk. She learns that Hannah has been confined to Gaze and its grounds by her husband Peter for seven years as punishment for having been unfaithful to him and for nearly killing him. Peter had been an abusive and unfaithful husband, and was often absent. During one of these absences, Hannah had an affair with Pip Lejour, who owns a nearby house called Riders. Peter arrived home unexpectedly and caught them in bed together. Later, after a struggle between Hannah and Peter, Peter fell over a cliff. He was badly injured but survived. He then left Gaze, leaving the estate in the hands of his former lover Gerald Scottow.

In Part 2 the narrative focus moves to Effingham Cooper, another outsider who arrives on the scene from London. Effingham is a successful public servant in his forties who is visiting his retired former Philosophy tutor Max Lejour, Pip Lejour's father, at Riders. Effingham is in love with Hannah and he tries to persuade to run away with him, but she refuses. He resigns himself to the situation, seeing himself as a courtly lover adoring Hannah from afar. Marian urges him to join her in a plan to rescue Hannah. He refuses, saying that Hannah is resigned to her fate and does not want to leave.

In Part 3 Effingham changes his mind and the rescue attempt takes place. He and Marian try to take advantage of Gerald Scottow's absence to abduct Hannah in Effingham's car, but the attempt fails. Another car, driven by Max's daughter Alice Lejour, unexpectedly comes toward them, and Effingham's car goes off the driveway and gets stuck in mud. Gerald Scottow returns to Gaze just in time to see what has happened. Effingham leaves with Alice in her car. Later, Alice returns with the news that Effingham has become lost in the bog.

Part 4 begins with Effingham's experiences wandering in the bog, in which he becomes stuck before being rescued by Denis Nolan. Gerald announces that Peter Crean-Smith is returning to the house after an absence of seven years. Hannah summons Gerald to her room, where he spends several hours. Gerald announces that he is going to take Hannah away from Gaze before Peter arrives.

Parts 5, 6 and 7 describe a series of violent events that result in the deaths of several of the main characters. After Gerald announces that Peter is not returning after all, and that he and Hannah are staying, Pip Lejour comes to Gaze and asks Hannah to leave with him, but she refuses. Hannah shoots and kills Gerald, and later runs away from the house and falls or jumps from a cliff and is killed. On his way back to Gaze after hearing of Gerald's death, Peter is killed when the car in which Denis is driving him from the airport goes into the sea. At the end of the novel Effingham and Marian return separately to London.

== Major themes ==
The novel's dramatic plot and remote setting are characteristic of Gothic fiction. Murdoch biographer and critic Peter J. Conradi notes the author's effective use of "the stage props and scenery of the Romantic sublime", including massive cliffs overlooking a dangerous sea, isolated castles, mysterious megaliths, and a deadly bog containing carnivorous plants.

Both religion and philosophy are important themes in the book. The central character Hannah is a believing Christian and the unicorn of the title is a symbol of Christ. The book's philosophical themes are presented chiefly by the Platonist philosopher Max Lejour, in his conversations with his former student Effingham Cooper. Their discussion of the situation at Gaze Castle in Chapter 12 deals with power, freedom, suffering, and especially with the nature of "goodness".

The typically Murdochian situation of an "enchanter" character surrounded by his or her coterie is exemplified by the household at Gaze. The relationships among the characters also illustrate the connection between erotic love and power relations that runs through Murdoch's fiction.

== Literary significance and reception ==
According to Conradi, The Times "was mystified by The Unicorn", while The Tablet and The Month reviewed it favourably. The New York Times reviewer emphasized the novel's Gothic characteristics, and commented that it "has that magnetic quality that is more usually the attribute of the detective story". The reviewer suggests that while the "familiarity of her material is one of her strengths", the reader is "led further and further into the mystery and terror of existence".

Several critics have remarked on the "closed" nature of the novel. Murdoch herself distinguished between the open novel, in which the characters are free to act, and the closed novel whose structure creates "a mythic and poetic intensity which the characters on occasion subserve". She has been criticized for exercising a "tyranny of form over character" while writing "according to the dictates of an obsolete standard and within the context of tired patterns". Conradi, on the other hand, argues that Murdoch's closed novels, of which The Unicorn is one, were not mere experiments in genre fiction, secondary to her more character-driven works, but were "central to her purpose".

Robert Scholes devoted a chapter in his 1967 book The Fabulators to The Unicorn. The variety of fabulation he attributes to the novel is allegory. He argues that while using "the conventions of English soft-boiled mystery fiction", Murdoch actually "toys with conventions". In his view, Marian and Effingham allegorically represent modern ideas and attitudes, while the Gaze household represents medieval Christianity and the Riders household headed by Max Lejour represents Platonic philosophy. A later academic interpretation of The Unicorn argues that Murdoch metafictionally deconstructs her own elaborately Gothic setting and story by encouraging the reader to see through the characters' self-deception.
