= A Fairly Honourable Defeat =

Novel by Iris Murdoch

- First British edition cover
- Author: Iris Murdoch
- Cover artist: John Sergeant
- Language: English
- Publisher: Chatto & Windus
- Publication date: 1970
- Publication place: United Kingdom
- Media type: Print (Hardcover)
- Pages: 402 pp
- ISBN: 0701115343
- OCLC: 611501179

A Fairly Honourable Defeat is a novel by the British writer and philosopher Iris Murdoch. Published in 1970, it was her thirteenth novel.

== Plot summary ==
The lives of several friends are thrown into disarray by the machinations of Julius King. Julius makes a bet with his ex-girlfriend Morgan that he can break up the homosexual couple Axel and Simon; meanwhile, Morgan and her brother-in-law Rupert are tricked into embarking on an affair, and Morgan's nephew Peter is falling in love with her.

== Characters ==
- Julius King, academic biochemist
- Rupert Foster, his former colleague, a senior civil servant writing a book on living morally
- Hilda Foster, Rupert's wife
- Simon Foster, Rupert's brother
- Axel Nilsson, Rupert's colleague and Simon's partner
- Morgan Browne, Tallis' wife, Julius's rejected lover and Hilda's sister
- Tallis Browne, Morgan's estranged husband
- Peter Foster, Rupert and Hilda's son
- Leonard Browne, Tallis's father

== Major themes ==
The story hinges on the wager that comes half-way through the book when Julius bets Morgan that he will be able to break up Simon and Axel's relationship. The consequences of the wager recall Shakespearean comedy (particularly Much Ado About Nothing), as well as Mozart's operas and the story of Job.

The gap between moral theory and practice is central to the book, and is exemplified by Rupert's inability to withstand temptation, despite having written a book about morality. Julius is a satanic figure, while Tallis is a Christ-like figure: Tallis absorbs suffering while Julius sows it. The underlying idea, which Murdoch adopted from Simone Weil, is that evil is propagated in the world by the transmission of suffering from one person to another, and that it can only be stopped by someone's being willing to accept the suffering without passing it on.

The relationship between Simon and Axel, which survives Julius's attempt to destroy it, is one of many portrayals of homosexuals in Murdoch's novels. According to Philip Hensher, their relationship is "one of the most convincing and warm portrayals of marriage in English fiction".

== Literary significance and reception ==
A Fairly Honourable Defeat received mixed reviews on its publication in 1970. In The New York Times, Christopher Lehmann-Haupt praised its ingenious plot and "comic spirit", and called it "the most entertaining Iris Murdoch I've read in years". Another The New York Times review remarked on the improbability of the plot, but considering the book as primarily a novel of ideas, found it "one of the most enjoyable and interesting of Iris Murdoch's recent books". On the other hand, writing in The Times, Nuala O'Faolain objected to an absence of sympathetic characters, while in The Washington Post Joyce Carol Oates found the characters "vacuous".

The literary critic and Murdoch biographer Peter J. Conradi describes A Fairly Honourable Defeat as a "brilliant and decisive masterpiece", and the novel with which she entered a "new artistic maturity" in which plot and characters are equally balanced. Literary scholars have examined various aspects of the novel, including its attempt to portray, in Tallis, an "interesting" good character, and its sympathetic depiction of a loving and stable homosexual relationship only three years after the Sexual Offences Act of 1967 decriminalized private sexual acts between adult men.

In 2010 A Fairly Honourable Defeat was one of the 21 novels on the long list for the Lost Man Booker Prize, but it did not appear on the short list of six from which the winner was chosen.

In 2022 British religious scholar Karen Armstrong said she left a book club when its members dismissed the novel as "evil."
