= The Green Knight (novel) =

1993 book by Irishman Iris Murdoch

- Cover of the first edition
- Author: Iris Murdoch
- Cover artist: Rembrandt, The Polish Rider
- Language: English
- Publisher: Chatto & Windus
- Publication date: 1993
- Publication place: United Kingdom
- Media type: Print
- Pages: 472pp
- ISBN: 0-7011-6030-6
- OCLC: 34742768

The Green Knight is the 25th novel by Irish writer and philosopher Iris Murdoch, first published in 1993.

== Plot summary ==
The lives of Louise Anderson and her daughters Aleph, Sefton and Moy become intertwined with a mystical character whose destiny both affects and informs the novel's central conflicts which include a murder that never actually occurs, sibling rivalry, love triangles, and one extremely sentient dog who dearly misses his owner. This novel loosely parodies the medieval poem Sir Gawain and the Green Knight; however, it is largely a comedy of errors with bizarre twists and turns in circumstances that threaten the stability of a circle of friends in a London community.

== Characters ==
- Lucas Graffe, a dark, Byronic figure who mentally tortures his brother Clement, the antagonist
- Louise Anderson, an emotionally repressed mother of three girls
- Sefton, daughter of Louise, a student and lover of history
- Aleph, daughter of Louise, the beautiful and elusive eldest sister
- Moy, daughter of Louise, a sensitive lover of all living things
- Joan, a childhood friend of Louise and mother of Harvey
- Harvey, family friend of the Anderson sisters and Joan's son
- Clement, brother of Lucas
- Bellamy, an ascetic and aspiring monk
- Peter Mir, a strange figure who becomes entwined in the lives of the others
- Anax, a border collie who desperately misses Bellamy who gave him up to prove his Christian convictions

== Reception ==
Publishers Weekly referred to the book as "...far from perfect, but passages of intense writing and keen depictions of people grappling with afflictions of the soul remind us that Murdoch's perspective is invaluable."
