= The Black Prince (novel) =

Novel by Iris Murdoch

- Cover of the first edition
- Author: Iris Murdoch
- Cover artist: Christopher Cornford
- Language: English
- Publisher: Chatto & Windus
- Publication date: Feb 1973
- Publication place: United Kingdom
- Media type: Print
- Pages: 363
- ISBN: 0-7011-1924-1

The Black Prince is Iris Murdoch's 15th novel, first published in 1973. The name of the novel alludes to Hamlet.

== Plot summary ==
The Black Prince has an unusual structure, consisting of a central first-person narrative bookended by fictional forewords and postscripts written by other characters in the central story. Each view is from an unreliable narrator.

The novel starts with Editor's Foreword ("Every artist is an unhappy lover. And unhappy lovers want to tell their story.") The story follows the ageing London author Bradley Pearson as he falls in love with the daughter of his old friend and literary rival, Arnold Baffin. For years Bradley has had a tense but strong relationship with Arnold, regarding himself as having 'discovered' the younger writer. The tension is ostensibly over Bradley's distaste for Arnold's lack of proper literary credentials, though later the other characters claim this to be the product of an Oedipus complex or a matter of jealousy, because Arnold is much more prolific and successful than Bradley. Their closeness is made apparent from the start of the book, when Arnold telephones Bradley, worried that he has killed his wife, Rachel, in a domestic row. Bradley attends with his former brother-in-law, Francis Marloe, in tow. Together they calm the injured Rachel and restore peace to the Baffins' household.

Bradley is dragged into the interpersonal dramas of family, friends, and associates all while trying for isolation, which he feels is necessary to create his 'masterpiece'. His intervention in the Baffins' marriage prompts Rachel to fall in love with him. His depressed sister, Priscilla, leaves her abusive husband and asks to stay with Bradley. The Baffins' young daughter, Julian, declares her admiration for Bradley and begs him to tutor her. Even Christian, Bradley's ex-wife, invades his life by seeking to repair their long-defunct relationship.

Bradley attempts to navigate these complications with mixed success. His inability to reciprocate Rachel's affections ultimately defuses their affair. She agrees, much to Bradley's satisfaction, to be no more than his friend. Christian starts an affair with Arnold, and he informs Bradley that he intends to leave Rachel for Christian. Yet Bradley fails to give proper attention to Priscilla, who pathetically alternates between despair and hysterical optimism.

Bradley falls in love with Julian. He privately vows never to confess this love or pursue Julian, but he cannot contain himself and blurts it out after vomiting on the sidewalk in front of Julian, and the two embark on a brief, intense affair. He steals away Julian to a rented sea-side cottage to evade Rachel and Arnold, who condemn the relationship. Priscilla, left without any companions, commits suicide; Bradley further postpones returning to London despite the news, and does not tell Julian because he feels that the news would destroy their romantic connection. When Arnold arrives, enraged, to collect his daughter, he turns this deception against Bradley. Julian is disturbed, and she promises her father that she will return home the next day. Yet Julian vanishes in the night, and Bradley believes that Arnold has taken her off against her will.

Bradley returns to London in a lovesick fury. A jealous Rachel confronts him, incorrectly telling him that Arnold has taken Julian to Europe. She mocks Bradley's high-minded notions regarding love; Julian, she says, already rues their affair. Filled with anger, Bradley tells Rachel about Arnold's plan to leave her. This revelation startles Rachel and she departs. The final action of the main section takes place at the Baffins' residence, where Bradley attends an incident parallel to the opening one. Rachel appears to have struck Arnold with a poker, killing him. Taking pity on her, Bradley helps her clean up the crime scene and advises her to tell the police the truth. She instead blames the murder on Bradley; he is put under arrest.

Bradley's arrest, trial, and conviction for Arnold's murder are briefly described. The police attribute the murder to Bradley's jealousy of Arnold's success as an author. No one can corroborate Bradley's version of events. His affairs with both Rachel and Julian, as well as Arnold's affair with Christian, remain secret. Rachel appears as a grieving widow, whereas Bradley appears as a cruel, possibly homosexual sociopath. He is convicted and sent to prison. Bradley then closes his account from his prison cell, reaffirming his love for Julian.

=== The Post-Scripts by the Dramatis Personae ===
This section is told from the point of view of the other characters, each having read the main section containing Bradley's account before writing their responses. They each interprets the action differently, focusing on separate issues to a more or less selfish degree. They exist to cast doubt not only on the veracity of the fiction that preceded it, but also on themselves. Christian, for example, dismisses any accusation of self-interest, claiming that Bradley lied because he was still in love with her. Francis assesses Bradley as a dysfunctional neurotic to promote his new book. Rachel also claims that Bradley may have lied due to unrequited love. Julian herself has little to say: she states that she remembers little of that time, and that she has no wish to remember anything more. The "editor" of the entire volume concludes the novel by supporting Bradley's account and praising his devotion to love as an all-empowering force.

== Influences and themes ==
Chief amongst Iris Murdoch's influences for this novel is the Shakespeare play Hamlet. It is openly referenced and discussed throughout, especially by Bradley. It is noted in the Post-Scripts that Bradley Pearson shares initials with the Black Prince, the title of Pearson's fictional as well as Murdoch's real work. Also present is the influence of Freud, especially through the frequent sexual imagery centred on recurrent references to the phallic Post Office Tower. Bradley's possible proxy admission of homosexuality is made possible through his seeming self-identification with Shakespeare throughout his narrative, and in his claiming both Hamlet and Shakespeare were homosexual. It is strengthened further by the moments in the book where he finds himself attracted to Julian, during each of which her gender is made ambiguous. The final of these is when he finally achieves sexual arousal, having previously been unable, when Julian has dressed herself as Hamlet. These themes are discussed by Francis, himself a homosexual, in the Post-Scripts. It is also notable that the two characters Bradley has achieved intimacy with, Julian and Christian, are not clearly female in characterisation or name. An attempted seduction by Rachel, a more traditionally feminine character, is described passionlessly by Bradley's narrative.

Subtler Ancient Greek influences are seen in Bradley's quest for a pseudo-Platonic perfection in his writing and his purported Asceticism.

== Awards and nominations ==
The Black Prince was awarded the 1973 James Tait Black Memorial Prize for fiction. It was shortlisted for the 1973 Booker Prize.
