= The Philosopher's Pupil =

Novel by Iris Murdoch

- Cover of the first edition
- Author: Iris Murdoch
- Cover artist: Cathie Felstead
- Language: English
- Publisher: Chatto & Windus
- Publication date: 1983
- Publication place: United Kingdom
- Media type: Print
- Pages: 576
- ISBN: 0-7011-2682-5

The Philosopher's Pupil is a 1983 novel by the British writer and philosopher Iris Murdoch. It is set in a small English spa town called Ennistone.

== Main characters ==
- George McCaffrey---George, 44 years old, was a pupil of John Robert Rozanov, the philosopher. After changing from philosophy to history and archaeology, he had entered the museum and archive world but published nothing except A Short History of the Ennistone Museum. He married Stella; their son, Rufus, died in an unexplained "mishap."
- Stella McCaffrey--- George's wife.
- Brian McCaffrey--- George's brother, age 41.
- Gabriel McCaffrey--- Brian's wife.
- Adam McCaffrey--- Gabriel and Brian's son, age 8.
- Zed--- Adam's small Papillon dog.
- Alex McCaffrey--- George and Brian's mother, age 66.
- Tom McCaffrey--- Alex's stepson, George and Brian's younger half-brother, age 20.
- John Robert Rozanov--- the philosopher.
- Hattie Meynell--- John Robert's granddaughter.
- Ruby Doyle--- Alex's long-time maid; a gipsy.
- Diane Sedleigh--- George's mistress and Ruby's sister or cousin (no one knows).
- Pearl Scotney--- Hattie's maid and companion, also related to Ruby and Diane.
- Emmanuel (Emma) Scarlett-Taylor--- Tom's friend.
- (Father) Bernard Jacoby--- Known as the creepy priest. Many view him with suspicion.
- N. --- The narrator and a minor character. He plays a tangential role in the story multiple times.

== Plot ==
George McCaffrey cannot understand why his long-ago philosophy professor told him to pick another field of study. But that professor, John Robert Rozanov, is returning to Ennistone where George lives, giving George the chance to ask him and finally understand. John Robert, the only famous person to have originated from Ennistone, will have none of it, simply telling George "you weren't good enough" and bringing the conversation to a close as quickly as he can, given George's desperate attempts to continue. John Robert has returned to Ennistone for an entirely different purpose, indeed one that disincentivizes further effort at socially graceful tolerance of George's neuroses. George is simultaneously a focus of town suspicion, as he was recently involved in a mysterious car crash that may have been an attempt to kill his wife, Stella.

As a part of his purpose, John Robert wishes to arrange the future of his granddaughter Hattie Meynell, without her knowledge, by encouraging Tom McCaffrey, George's younger step brother, to woo Hattie, and then to marry her. But during their first meeting, when Tom clumsily lets on that his meeting request was not entirely the result of his own initiative and interest in Hattie, she reacts with hurt and anger. Through a sequence of plot twists, Tom finds himself trapped deep beneath the spa for which Ennistone is famous. As in many Murdoch novels, this physical struggle for survival parallels the characters' struggle to resolve their complex, interwoven emotional issues.
