= Iris Murdoch =

Irish-born British writer and philosopher (1919–1999)

Dame Iris Murdoch DBE
- Born: Jean Iris Murdoch; 15 July 1919; Dublin, Ireland
- Died: 8 February 1999 (aged 79); Oxford, England
- Spouse: John Bayley (m. 1956)
- Awards: Booker Prize (1978)

Education
- Education: Somerville College, Oxford; Newnham College, Cambridge
- Academic advisor: John Wisdom

Philosophical work
- Era: Contemporary philosophy
- Region: Western philosophy
- School: Analytic philosophy; Virtue ethics; Modern Platonism
- Institutions: St Anne's College, Oxford; Royal College of Art
- Notable students: David Lewis
- Notable works: Sartre: Romantic Rationalist (1953); Under the Net (1954); The Sovereignty of Good (1970); The Sea, the Sea (1978)
- Notable ideas: Sovereignty of the good; Idea of perfection

Dame Jean Iris Murdoch (/ˈmɜːrdɒk/ MUR-dok; 15 July 1919 – 8 February 1999) was an Irish and British novelist and philosopher. Murdoch is best known for her novels about good and evil, sexual relationships, morality, and the power of the unconscious. Her first published novel, Under the Net (1954), was selected in 1998 as one of Modern Library's 100 best English-language novels of the 20th century. Her 1978 novel The Sea, The Sea won the Booker Prize. In 1987, she was made a Dame by Queen Elizabeth II for services to literature. In 2008, The Times ranked Murdoch twelfth on a list of "The 50 greatest British writers since 1945".

Her other books include The Bell (1958), A Severed Head (1961), An Unofficial Rose (1962), The Red and the Green (1965), The Nice and the Good (1968), A Fairly Honourable Defeat (1970), The Black Prince (1973), Henry and Cato (1976), The Philosopher's Pupil (1983), The Good Apprentice (1985), The Book and the Brotherhood (1987), The Message to the Planet (1989), and The Green Knight (1993)

As a philosopher, Murdoch's best-known work is The Sovereignty of Good (1970). She was married for 43 years, until her death, to the literary critic and author John Bayley.

== Life ==
Murdoch was born in Phibsborough, Dublin, Ireland, the daughter of Irene Alice (née Richardson, 1899–1985) and Wills John Hughes Murdoch, during the Irish War of Independence. Her father, a civil servant, came from a mainly Presbyterian sheep farming family from Hillhall, County Down, in Ulster. In 1915, he enlisted as a soldier in King Edward's Horse and served in France during the First World War before being commissioned as a Second lieutenant. Her mother had trained as a singer before Iris was born, and was from a middle-class Church of Ireland family in Dublin who originated from the Plantation of Ulster landlord family of the Richardsons of Drum. Iris Murdoch's parents first met in Dublin when her father was on leave and were married in 1918. Iris was the couple's only child. When she was a few weeks old the family moved to London, where her father had joined the Ministry of Health as a second-class clerk. She was a second cousin of the Irish mathematician Brian Murdoch.

Murdoch was brought up in Chiswick and educated privately, entering the Froebel Demonstration School in 1925 and attending Badminton School in Bristol as a boarder from 1932 to 1938. In 1938, she went up to Somerville College, Oxford, with the intention of studying English, but switched to "Greats", a course of study combining classics, ancient history, and philosophy. At Oxford she studied philosophy with Donald M. MacKinnon and attended Eduard Fraenkel's seminars on Agamemnon. She was awarded a first-class honours degree in 1942. After leaving Oxford she went to work in London for HM Treasury. In June 1944, she left the Treasury and went to work for the United Nations Relief and Rehabilitation Administration (UNRRA). At first, she was stationed in London at the agency's European Regional Office. In 1945, she was transferred first to Brussels, then to Innsbruck, and finally to Graz, Austria, where she worked in a refugee camp. She left the UNRRA in 1946.

From 1947 to 1948, Murdoch studied philosophy as a postgraduate at Newnham College, Cambridge. She met Ludwig Wittgenstein at Cambridge but did not hear him lecture, as he had left his Trinity College professorship before she arrived. In 1948 she became a fellow of St Anne's College, Oxford, where she taught philosophy until 1963. From 1963 to 1967, she taught one day a week in the General Studies department at the Royal College of Art.

In 1956, Murdoch married John Bayley, a literary critic, novelist, and from 1974 to 1992 Warton Professor of English at the University of Oxford, whom she had met in Oxford in 1954. The unusual romantic partnership lasted more than forty years until Murdoch's death. Bayley thought that sex was "inescapably ridiculous." Murdoch in contrast had "multiple affairs with both men and women which, on discomposing occasions, [Bayley] witnessed for himself." Notably she had a long and turbulent love relationship with writer Brigid Brophy.

Iris Murdoch's first novel, Under the Net, was published in 1954. She had previously published essays on philosophy, and the first monograph about Jean-Paul Sartre published in English. She went on to produce 25 more novels and additional works of philosophy, as well as poetry and drama. In 1976, she was named a Commander of the Order of the British Empire and in 1987 was made a Dame Commander of the Order of the British Empire. She was awarded honorary degrees by Durham University (DLitt, 1977), the University of Bath (DLitt, 1983), University of Cambridge (1993) and Kingston University (1994), among others. She was elected a Foreign Honorary Member of the American Academy of Arts and Sciences in 1982.

The house at 30 Charlbury Road where she lived with her husband from 1989 to her death has an Oxfordshire blue plaque. Her last novel, Jackson's Dilemma, was published in 1995. Iris Murdoch was diagnosed with Alzheimer's disease in 1997 and died in 1999 in Oxford. There is a bench dedicated to her on the grounds of Lady Margaret Hall, Oxford, where she used to enjoy walking. Dublin City Council and the Irish postal service marked the centenary of Murdoch's birth in 2019 by unveiling a commemorative plaque and postage stamp at her birthplace.

== Work ==
=== Philosophy ===
Martha Nussbaum has argued for Murdoch's "transformative impact on the discipline" of moral philosophy because she directed her analysis not at the once-dominant matters of will and choice, but at those of attention (how people learn to see and conceive of one another) and phenomenal experience (how the sensory "thinginess" of life shapes moral sensibility). Because as Calley A. Hornbuckle puts it, "For Murdoch, the most essential kind of knowledge is the knowledge that other people exist."

Although first a student, and later a lecturer and scholar, of 20th century British analytic moral philosophy, Murdoch rejected most of what was characteristic of that tradition. With the rise of anti-metaphysical empiricism in general, and logical positivism in particular, emotivists like A. J. Ayer and prescriptivists like R. M. Hare settled the good independently of active cognitive practices and therefore not something to be attained by them. In The Sovereignty of Good, Murdoch argues that such a criterion of reality follows from the adoption of an "uncriticized conception of science." Such detachment from personal immersion in the reality of moral life was incompatible with her metaphysical commitments. Lawrence Blum concludes from such considerations that "[s]he is thus a 'moral realist', 'moral objectivist' and 'moral cognitivist'[...]."

In a recent survey of Murdoch's philosophical work, Justin Broackes points to several distinctive features of Murdoch's moral philosophy, including a "moral realism or 'naturalism', allowing into the world cases of such properties as humility or generosity; an anti‐scientism; a rejection of Humean moral psychology; a sort of 'particularism'; special attention to the virtues; and emphasis on the metaphor of moral perception or 'seeing' moral facts." The reasons for this are unclear, but the Scottish literary critic G. S. Fraser notes that, in the late 1940s, the philosophers who were then occupying Murdoch's attention were late Victorian British idealists, such as T. H. Green, F. H. Bradley, and Bernard Bosanquet. Broackes also notes that Murdoch's influence on the discipline of philosophy was sometimes indirect since it impacted both her contemporaries and the following generation of philosophers, particularly Elizabeth Anscombe, Philippa Foot, John McDowell, and Bernard Williams. She sent copies of her earlier novels to Anscombe, but there is nothing in Anscombe's writing which reflects any of these.

Her philosophical work was influenced by Simone Weil (from whom she borrows the concept of 'attention'), and by Plato, under whose banner she claimed to fight. In re-animating Plato, she gives force to the reality of the Good, and to a sense of the moral life as a pilgrimage from illusion to reality. From this perspective, Murdoch's work offers perceptive criticism of Kant, Sartre, and Wittgenstein ('early' and 'late'). Her most central parable, which appears in The Sovereignty of Good, asks us (in Nussbaum's succinct account), "to imagine a mother-in-law, M, who has contempt for D, her daughter-in-law. M sees D as common, cheap, low. Since M is a self-controlled Englishwoman, she behaves (so Murdoch stipulates) with perfect graciousness all the while, and no hint of her real view surfaces in her acts. But she realises, too, that her feelings and thoughts are unworthy, and likely to be generated by jealousy and an excessively keen desire to hang on to her son. So she sets herself a moral task: she will change her view of D, making it more accurate, less marred by selfishness. She gives herself exercises in vision: where she is inclined to say 'coarse,' she will say, and see, 'spontaneous.' Where she is inclined to say 'common,' she will say, and see, 'fresh and naive.' As time goes on, the new images supplant the old. Eventually M does not have to make such an effort to control her actions: they flow naturally from the way she has come to see D." This is how M cultivates a pattern of behavior that leads her to view D "justly or lovingly". The parable is partly meant to show (against Oxford contemporaries including R. M. Hare and Stuart Hampshire) the importance of the "inner" life to moral action. Seeing another correctly can depend on overcoming jealousy, and discoveries about the world involve inner work.

=== Fiction ===
Her novels, in their attention and generosity to the inner lives of individuals, follow the tradition of novelists like Dostoyevsky, Tolstoy, George Eliot, and Proust, besides showing an abiding love of Shakespeare. There is however great variety in her achievement, and the richly layered structure and compelling realistic comic imagination of The Black Prince (1973) is very different from the early comic works Under the Net (1954) or The Unicorn (1963). The Unicorn can be read as a sophisticated Gothic romance, or as a novel with Gothic trappings, or perhaps as a parody of the Gothic mode of writing. The Black Prince, for which Murdoch won the James Tait Black Memorial Prize, is a study of erotic obsession, and the text becomes more complicated, suggesting multiple interpretations, when subordinate characters contradict the narrator and the mysterious "editor" of the book in a series of afterwords. Though her novels differ markedly, and her style developed, themes recur. Her novels often include upper-middle-class male intellectuals caught in moral dilemmas, gay characters, refugees, Anglo-Catholics with crises of faith, empathetic pets, curiously "knowing" children and sometimes a powerful and almost demonic male "enchanter" who imposes his will on the other characters—a type of man Murdoch is said to have modelled on her lover, the Nobel laureate Elias Canetti.

Murdoch was awarded the Booker Prize in 1978 for The Sea, the Sea, a finely detailed novel about the power of love and loss, featuring a retired stage director who is overwhelmed by jealousy when he meets his erstwhile lover after several decades apart. It was dedicated to archaeologist Rosemary Cramp, who had been a student at St Anne's. An authorised collection of her poetic writings, Poems by Iris Murdoch, appeared in 1997, edited by Paul Hullah and Yozo Muroya. Several of her works have been adapted for the screen, including the British television series of her novels An Unofficial Rose and The Bell. J. B. Priestley's dramatisation of her 1961 novel A Severed Head starred Ian Holm and Richard Attenborough.

In 1988 the Hamburg-based Alfred Toepfer Foundation awarded Murdoch its annual Shakespeare Prize in recognition of her life's work. In 1997, she was awarded the Golden PEN Award by English PEN for "a Lifetime's Distinguished Service to Literature".

Harold Bloom wrote in his 1986 review of The Good Apprentice that "no other contemporary British novelist" seemed of her "eminence". A. S. Byatt called her "a great philosophical novelist." James Wood wrote in How Fiction Works: "In her literary and philosophical criticism, she again and again stresses that the creation of free and independent characters is the mark of a great novelist; yet her own characters never have this freedom." He stressed that some authors, "like Tolstoy, Trollope, Balzac and Dickens", wrote about people different from themselves by choice, whereas others, such as "James, Flaubert, Lawrence, Woolf", have more interest in the self. Wood called Murdoch "poignant", because she spent her whole life writing in the latter category, while she struggled to fit herself into the former.

== Political views ==
Murdoch won a scholarship to study at Vassar College in the US in 1946, but was refused a visa because she had joined the Communist Party of Great Britain in 1938, while a student at Oxford. She left the party in 1942, when she went to work at the Treasury, but remained sympathetic to communism for several years. In later years she was allowed to visit the United States, but always had to obtain a waiver from the provisions of the McCarran Act, which barred Communist Party members and former members from entering the country. In a 1990 Paris Review interview, she said that her membership of the Communist Party had made her see "how strong and how awful it [Marxism] is, certainly in its organized form".

Biographer Peter Conradi wrote: "No one ever agrees about who is entitled to lay claim to Irishness. Iris's Belfast cousins today call themselves British, not Irish ... [But] Iris has as valid a claim to call herself Irish as most North Americans have to call themselves American". Conradi notes A. N. Wilson's record that Murdoch regretted the sympathetic portrayal of the Irish nationalist cause she had given earlier in The Red and the Green, and a competing defence of the book at Caen in 1978. The novel, while broad of sympathy, is hardly an unambiguous celebration of the 1916 rising, dwelling upon bloodshed, unintended consequences and the evils of romanticism, besides celebrating selfless individuals on both sides. Later, of Ian Paisley, Murdoch stated "[he] sincerely condemns violence and did not intend to incite the Protestant terrorists. That he is emotional and angry is not surprising, after 12–15 years of murderous IRA activity. All this business is deep in my soul, I'm afraid." In private correspondence with her close friend and fellow philosopher Philippa Foot, she remarked in 1978 that she felt "unsentimental about Ireland to the point of hatred" and, of a Franco-Irish conference she had attended in Caen in 1982, said that "the sounds of all those Irish voices made me feel privately sick. They just couldn't help sympathising with the IRA, like Americans do. A mad bad world".

== Biographies and memoirs ==
Peter J. Conradi's biography of Murdoch was published in 2001. John Updike commented: "There would be no need to complain of literary biographies [...] if they were all as good". The text addresses many popular questions about Murdoch, such as how Irish she was and what her politics were. Though not a trained philosopher, Conradi's interest in Murdoch's achievement as a thinker is evident in the biography, and yet more so in his earlier work of literary criticism, The Saint and the Artist: A Study of Iris Murdoch's Works (Macmillan, 1986; HarperCollins, 2001). He also recalled his personal encounters with Murdoch in Going Buddhist: Panic and Emptiness, the Buddha and Me (Short Books, 2005). Conradi's archive of material on Murdoch, together with Iris Murdoch's Oxford library, is held at Kingston University.

An account of Murdoch's life with a different ambition is given by A. N. Wilson in his 2003 book Iris Murdoch as I Knew Her. The work was described by Galen Strawson in The Guardian as "mischievously revelatory" and labelled by Wilson himself as an "anti-biography".

David Morgan met Iris Murdoch in 1964, when he was a student at the Royal College of Art. His 2010 memoir With Love and Rage: A Friendship with Iris Murdoch, describes their lifelong friendship.

John Bayley wrote two memoirs of his life with Iris Murdoch. Iris: A Memoir was published in the United Kingdom in 1998, shortly before her death. The American edition, which was published in 1999, was called Elegy for Iris. A sequel entitled Iris and Her Friends was published in 1999, after her death. Murdoch was portrayed by Kate Winslet and Judi Dench in Richard Eyre's film Iris (2001), based on Bayley's memories of his wife as she developed Alzheimer's disease.

In her centenary year, 2019, a collection of unpublished memoirs was published by Sabrestorm Press, entitled Iris Murdoch: A Centenary Celebration, edited by Miles Leeson, who directs the Iris Murdoch Research Centre at the University of Chichester, UK.

== Adaptations ==
In 2015, BBC Radio 4 broadcast an Iris Murdoch season, with several memoirs by people who knew her, and dramatisations of her novels:

- Iris Murdoch: Dream Girl
- The Sea, the Sea
- A Severed Head

In March 2019, the London-based production company Rebel Republic Films announced that it had optioned The Italian Girl, and was developing a screenplay based on the book.

== Bibliography ==
Novels

- Under the Net (1954)
- The Flight from the Enchanter (1956)
- The Sandcastle (1957)
- The Bell (1958)
- A Severed Head (1961)
- An Unofficial Rose (1962)
- The Unicorn (1963)
- The Italian Girl (1964)
- The Red and the Green (1965)
- The Time of the Angels (1966)
- The Nice and the Good (1968)
- Bruno's Dream (1969)
- A Fairly Honourable Defeat (1970)
- An Accidental Man (1971)
- The Black Prince (1973), winner of the James Tait Black Memorial Prize
- The Sacred and Profane Love Machine (1974), winner of the Whitbread literary award for Fiction
- A Word Child (1975)
- Henry and Cato (1976)
- The Sea, the Sea (1978), winner of the Booker Prize
- Nuns and Soldiers (1980)
- The Philosopher's Pupil (1983)
- The Good Apprentice (1985)
- The Book and the Brotherhood (1987)
- The Message to the Planet (1989)
- The Green Knight (1993)
- Jackson's Dilemma (1995)

Short stories

- "Something Special" (1957)

Philosophy

- Sartre: Romantic Rationalist (1953)
- The Sovereignty of Good (1970)
- The Fire and the Sun (1977)
- Metaphysics as a Guide to Morals (1992)
- Existentialists and Mystics: Writings on Philosophy and Literature (1997)

Plays

- A Severed Head (with J. B. Priestley, 1964)
- The Italian Girl (with James Saunders, 1969)
- The Three Arrows; The Servants and the Snow (1972)
- The Servants (1980)
- Acastos: Two Platonic Dialogues (1986)
- The Black Prince (1987)

Poetry collections

- A Year of Birds (1978; revised edition, 1984)
- Poems by Iris Murdoch (1997)
- Poems from an Attic: Selected Poems 1936–1995 (2025)

Source: Centre for Iris Murdoch Studies, Faculty of Arts and Social Sciences Kingston University

== Sources ==
- Antonaccio, Maria (2000), Picturing the human: the moral thought of Iris Murdoch OUP. ISBN 0-19-516660-4
- Bayley, John (1999), Elegy for Iris. Picador. ISBN 0-312-25382-6
- Bayley, John (1998), Iris: A Memoir of Iris Murdoch. Gerald Duckworth & Co. Ltd. ISBN 0-7156-2848-8
- Bayley, John (1999), Iris and Her Friends: A Memoir of Memory and Desire. W. W. Norton & Company ISBN 0-393-32079-0
- Bove, Cheryl (1993) Understanding Iris Murdoch. Columbia, University of South Carolina Press. ISBN 087249876X.
- Byatt. A.S. (1965) Degrees of Freedom: The Early Novels of Iris Murdoch. Chatto & Windus
- Conradi, P. J. (2001) Iris Murdoch: A Life. W. W. Norton & Company ISBN 0-393-04875-6
- Conradi, P. J. (foreword by John Bayley), The Saint and the Artist. Macmillan 1986, HarperCollins 2001 ISBN 0-00-712019-2
- de Melo Araújo, Sofia & Vieira, Fátima (ed.) (2011), Iris Murdoch, Philosopher Meets Novelist. Cambridge Scholars Publishing. ISBN 1-4438-2883-1
- Dooley, Gillian (ed.), (2003), From a Tiny Corner in the House of Fiction: Conversations With Iris Murdoch. Columbia, University of South Carolina Press ISBN 1-57003-499-0
- Laverty, Megan (2007), Iris Murdoch's Ethics: A Consideration of Her Romantic Vision. Continuum Press ISBN 0-8264-8535-9
- Martens, Paul. (2012), "Iris Murdoch: Kierkegaard as Existentialist, Romantic, Hegelian, and Problematically Religious" in Kierkegaard's Influence on Philosophy. Ashgate Publishing. ISBN 978-140-944055-0.
- Mauri, Margarita (ed.) (2014). Ética y literatura. Cinco novelas de Iris Murdoch. Kit-book. ISBN 978-84-942067-2-6.
- Monteleone, Ester (2012), Il Bene, l'individuo, la virtù. La filosofia morale di Iris Murdoch. Rome, Armando Editore. ISBN 978-88-6677-087-9
- Morgan, David (2010), With Love and Rage: A Friendship with Iris Murdoch. Kingston University Press. ISBN 9781899999422
- Widdows, Heather (2005) The Moral Vision of Iris Murdoch. Ashgate Press ISBN 0-7546-3625-9
- Wilson, A. N. (2003) Iris Murdoch as I Knew Her. London, Hutchinson. ISBN 9780091742461
- Wolfe, Graham (2022), "Iris Murdoch and the Immoralities of Adaptation" in Adaptation.
- Zuba, Sonja (2009), Iris Murdoch's Contemporary Retrieval of Plato: The Influence of an Ancient Philosopher on a Modern Novelist. Lewiston, New York: Edwin Mellen Press. ISBN 9780773438248
