= Peter J. Conradi =

British author and academic

Peter J. Conradi FRSL (born 8 May 1945) is a British author and academic, best known for his studies of writer and philosopher, Iris Murdoch, who was a close friend. He is a professor emeritus of English at the University of Kingston and has been visiting fellow at Magdalen College, Oxford, and research fellow at University College London.

== Education ==
Conradi was educated at Oundle School, before going on to study English literature at the University of East Anglia (BA, 1967), the University of Sussex (MA, 1969) and University College London (PhD, 1983).

== Career ==
Conradi has taught at South Bank Polytechnic, University of Colorado, Boulder (Exchange Professor), University of East Anglia, Kingston University and the Jagiellonian University, Krakow, Poland (British Council Professor). In 1997 Conradi left Kingston University, where he is now Emeritus Professor, to write freelance; and in 2010 was elected a Fellow of the Royal Society of Literature.

Conradi has written a number of books, including studies of John Fowles, Fyodor Dostoevsky and Angus Wilson, but he is best known for his work on the life and work of Iris Murdoch. His authorised biography of Murdoch was widely chosen as a book of the year on its publication in 2001.

== Personal life ==
Conradi lives in London and Radnorshire with his civil partner Jim O’Neill. He is a practising Buddhist. He is a trustee of the Bleddfa Centre for the Creative Spirit and has been co-editor (2007–2018) of the Transactions of the Radnorshire Society.

== Writings ==
- John Fowles (1982) (ISBN 0-416-32250-6)
- Iris Murdoch. The Saint and the Artist (1986, 3rd edition 2001) (ISBN 0-312-43614-9)
- Fyodor Dostoevsky (1987) (ISBN 0-312-02053-8)
- Angus Wilson (1997) Isobel Armstrong and Bryan Loughrey (editors) (ISBN 0-7463-0803-5)
- Cold War, Common Pursuit: British Council Lecturers in Poland 1938-98 (1999) with Stoddard Martin (editor)
- Existentialists and Mystics: Writings on Philosophy and Literature by Iris Murdoch (1999) (editor)
- Iris Murdoch: A Life (2001) and later revisions (ISBN 0-393-04875-6)
- Going Buddhist: Panic and Emptiness, the Buddha and Me (2005) (ISBN 1-904095-63-1)
- At the Bright Hem of God (2009) (ISBN 978-1-85411-490-7)
- Iris Murdoch: A Writer at War: Letters & Diaries, 1939-45 (editor) (2010) (ISBN 978-1-906021-22-1)
- A Very English Hero: The Making of Frank Thompson (2012) (ISBN 978-1-408802-43-4)

A Dictionary of Interesting and Important Dogs
