= 2016 Man Booker Prize =

Literary award

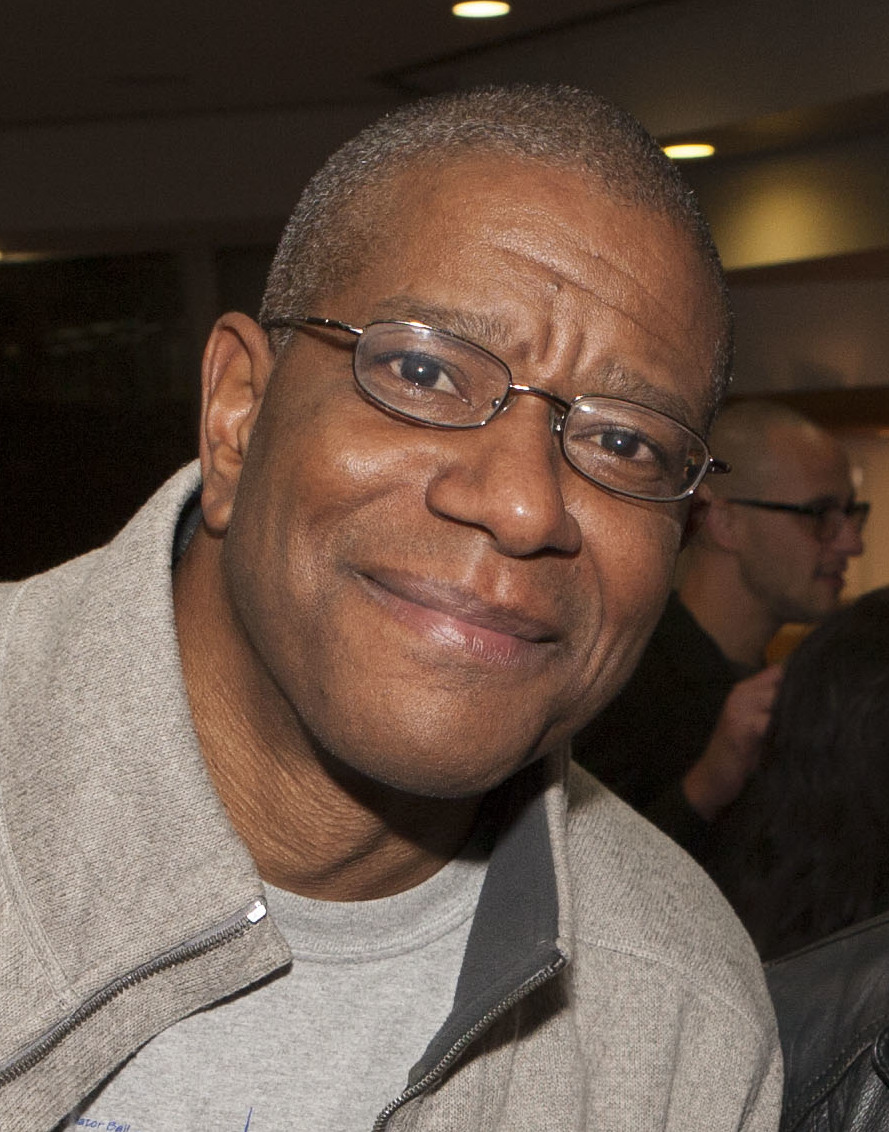
Paul Beatty, winner of the 2016 Man Booker Prize

The 2016 Booker Prize for Fiction was awarded at a ceremony on 25 October 2016. The Man Booker dozen of 13 books was announced on 27 July, narrowed down to a shortlist of six titles on 13 September. Paul Beatty was awarded the 2016 Booker Prize for his novel The Sellout, receiving 50,000 pounds ($61,000), and becoming the first American author to be awarded the prize.

== Judging panel ==
- Amanda Foreman (chair)
- Jon Day
- Abdulrazak Gurnah
- David Harsent
- Olivia Williams

== Nominees ==
indicates the winner

=== Shortlist ===
| Author | Title | Genre(s) | Country | Publisher |
|---|---|---|---|---|
| Paul Beatty | The Sellout | Novel | US | Oneworld Publications |
| Deborah Levy | Hot Milk | Novel | UK | Hamish Hamilton |
| Graeme Macrae Burnet | His Bloody Project | Novel | UK | Contraband |
| Ottessa Moshfegh | Eileen | Novel | US | Jonathan Cape |
| David Szalay | All That Man Is | Novel | UK | Jonathan Cape |
| Madeleine Thien | Do Not Say We Have Nothing | Novel | Canada | Granta Books |

=== Longlist ===
| Author | Title | Genre(s) | Country | Publisher |
|---|---|---|---|---|
| Paul Beatty | The Sellout | Novel | US | Oneworld Publications |
| Deborah Levy | Hot Milk | Novel | UK | Hamish Hamilton |
| Graeme Macrae Burnet | His Bloody Project | Novel | UK | Contraband |
| Ottessa Moshfegh | Eileen | Novel | US | Jonathan Cape |
| David Szalay | All That Man Is | Novel | UK | Jonathan Cape |
| Madeleine Thien | Do Not Say We Have Nothing | Novel | Canada | Granta Books |
| J. M. Coetzee | The Schooldays of Jesus | Novel | South Africa-Australia | Harvill Secker |
| A. L. Kennedy | Serious Sweet | Novel | UK | Jonathan Cape |
| Elizabeth Strout | My Name Is Lucy Barton | Novel | US | Viking |
| Ian McGuire | The North Water | Novel | UK | Scribner UK |
| David Means | Hystopia | Novel | US | Faber & Faber |
| Wyl Menmuir | The Many | Novel | Uk | Salt |
| Virginia Reeves | Work Like Any Other | Novel | UK | Scribner UK |

== See also ==
- List of winners and shortlisted authors of the Booker Prize for Fiction
