= The Many =

The Many may refer to:

- The Many, a fictional alien communion in the video game System Shock 2
- The Many (novel), a book by Wyl Menmuir
- The Many (advertising agency), an American agency formerly known as Mistress
