= My Year of Rest and Relaxation =

2018 novel by Ottessa Moshfegh

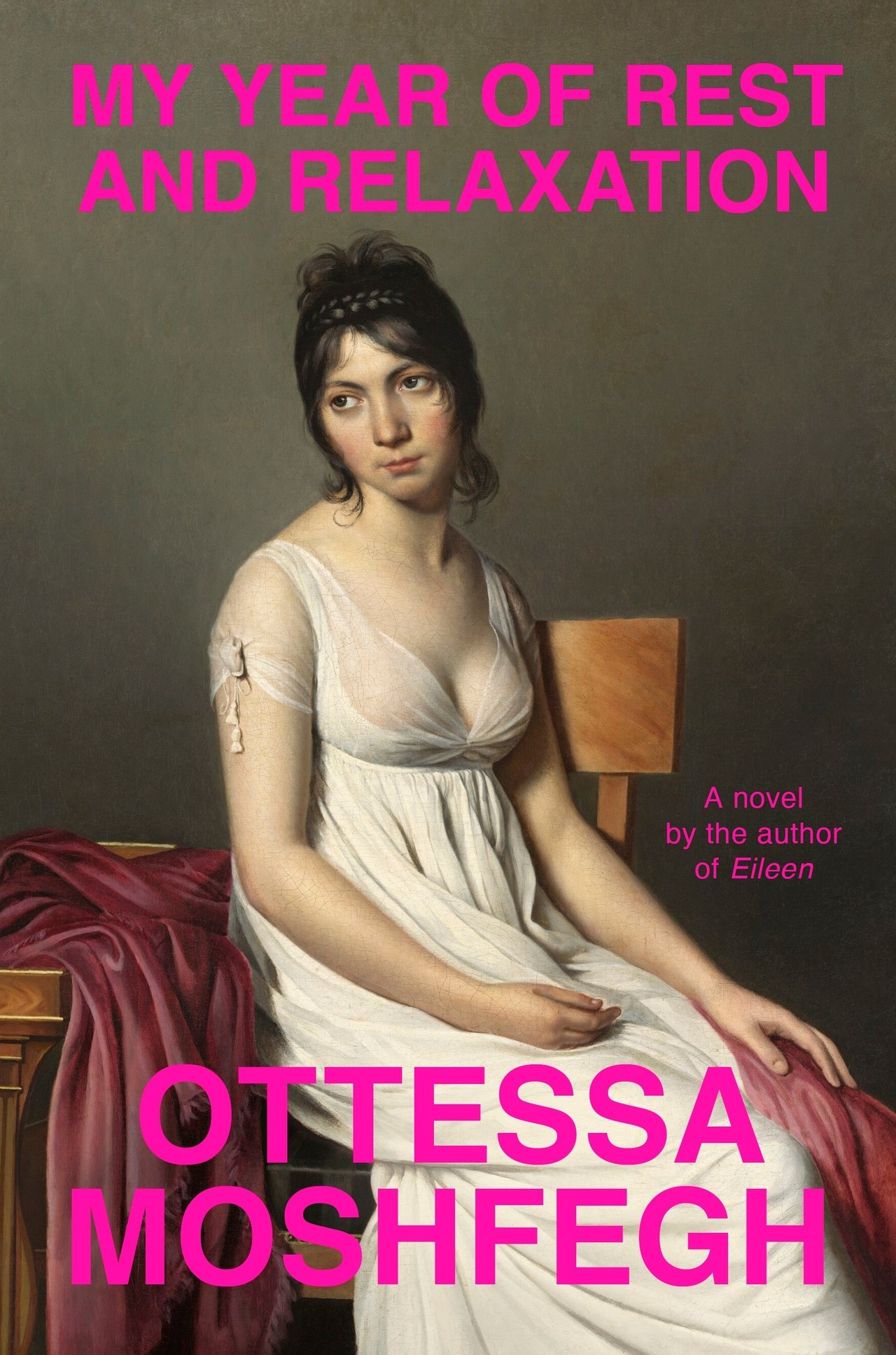
- The cover features a Jacques Louis David painting
- Author: Ottessa Moshfegh
- Language: English
- Genre: Literary fiction
- Publisher: Penguin Press
- Publication date: July 10, 2018
- Publication place: United States
- Pages: 304
- ISBN: 978-0525522119

My Year of Rest and Relaxation is a 2018 novel by American author Ottessa Moshfegh. Moshfegh's second novel, it is set in New York City in 2000 and 2001 and follows an unnamed protagonist as she gradually escalates her use of prescription medications in an attempt to sleep for an entire year.

== Plot ==
Set in 2000, the anonymous narrator, a slender and beautiful blonde from a wealthy WASP family, is a recent Columbia University art history graduate grappling with her personal tragedies and the pressures of societal expectations. During her junior year in college, both of her parents died—first her father from cancer, then her mother in a suicide caused by an interaction between psychiatric medications and alcohol.

Now residing on Manhattan's Upper East Side and increasingly dissatisfied with her post-collegiate life, the narrator finds Dr. Tuttle, a psychiatrist with unorthodox methods. Dr. Tuttle readily prescribes a range of sleeping pills, anti-anxiety, and anti-psychotic medications. The narrator, however, intends to spend as few hours awake as possible, numbing herself with a steady regimen of pills and repeatedly watching middlebrow movies on her VCR until the machine finally breaks down.

After being dismissed from her art gallery job in mid-June 2000, the narrator decides to subsist on her inheritance and unemployment benefits, embarking on a year-long quest to 'reset' her life through extensive sleep. But her "year of rest and relaxation" is regularly interrupted. Her college roommate Reva (who unabashedly envies the narrator's wealth and appearance) makes frequent unannounced visits, which the narrator allows despite her disdain for Reva's social climbing and annoyance at having to listen to Reva's problems—her own mother's terminal cancer, a frustrating affair with her married boss.

The narrator is also occasionally in contact with an older boyfriend, Trevor (a banker who works in the World Trade Center), though he frequently cuts off their relationship to date women his own age, returning when one of them has dumped him or occasionally in response to the narrator's pleading.

The narrator initially makes trips out of her apartment only to a local bodega, Dr. Tuttle's office, and the Rite Aid to fill her prescriptions. But as she takes stronger and stronger medications, she begins leaving the apartment in her sleep to, among other things, go to nightclubs (or so she gathers from Polaroid photographs and glitter she discovers when she awakes from her multi-day blackout). She also wakes up on a train headed toward the funeral of Reva's mother on New Year's Eve 2000.

Convinced these activities—which have no appeal to the narrator in her conscious hours—are disrupting her efforts at complete rest, she decides she needs to sleep locked inside her apartment. She contacts Ping Xi, an artist represented by the gallery where she used to work, who agrees to bring her food and other necessities for four months in exchange for being allowed to make any kind of art project he wishes while she is unconscious: the only requirement is that all trace of him be gone when she wakes every three days to eat, bathe, and take another pill to put herself under again.

To prepare, she empties her apartment, giving her designer clothes to the ever-covetous Reva, who has just been dumped by her boss—unaware that she is pregnant, he arranged a promotion that would transfer her out of his office and to the company's office in the World Trade Center. Reva plans to have an abortion; the narrator sleeps until June 1.

She readjusts to life slowly, spending hours over the summer of 2001 sitting in a park and refurnishing her once-expensively decorated apartment with mismatched, used furniture from Goodwill. But as she hoped, her worldview has been transformed by her rest: her contempt for Reva has evaporated and for the first time she earnestly reciprocates her friend's previously insistent declarations that "I love you", though now Reva is the one who has become distant.

The narrator calls Reva once more in early September, but Reva brushes off the call. They never speak again. On September 11, Trevor is in Barbados on his honeymoon and Reva dies in the terror attack on the World Trade Center. The narrator goes out to buy a new VCR to tape the news coverage, returning as time passes to watch the video, in particular footage of a woman leaping out of the North Tower whom she believes to be Reva.

== Background and publication ==
My Year of Rest and Relaxation is Moshfegh's second novel, following Eileen (2015, shortlisted for the Man Booker Prize), as well as a novella (McGlue, 2014) and a short story collection (Homesick for Another World, 2017). Moshfegh initially planned My Year of Rest and Relaxation to be focused primarily on the terror attacks of September 11, 2001, even reaching out to terrorism expert Paul Bremer, but she called off the interview and the project took a different tack.

Of her experience writing the novel, Moshfegh said:

I feel like the book was successful in that I graduated out of a lot of those concerns by writing the book. When I wrote the book, my passion and anger were located much more outwardly and so the tone of the narrator, who I think a very angry person, is not something I relate to anymore.

My Year of Rest and Relaxation was published on July 10, 2018, by Penguin Press.

== Style and themes ==
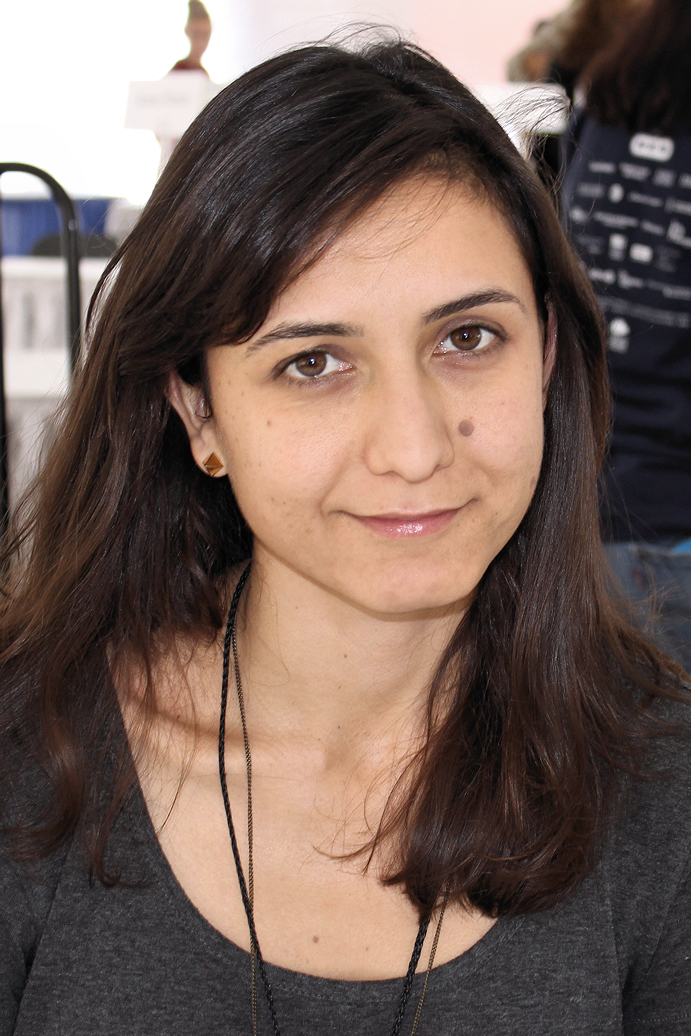
The author in 2015

My Year of Rest and Relaxation is narrated in the first person, establishing a personage critics called "an antihero...[who] resists every stereotype of the female nurturer" and "hypnotically unlikeable", perhaps even "an attempt to see just how 'unlikeable' characters can get." Reviewing the novel in Pacific Standard, Rebecca Stoner called the narrator's "acid insights into the various aspects of life that disgust her...one of the primary pleasures of the novel" and in the Chicago Review of Books, Lincoln Michel found the "narrator...an enjoyable hater whose observations are both caustic and insightful." In The New Yorker, Jia Tolentino read the novel differently: though she too notes the novel's "withering attention to the gleaming absurdities of pre-9/11 New York City, an environment...beset with delusional optimism, horrifically carefree," Tolentino felt My Year of Rest and Relaxation departed from Moshfegh's earlier work featuring "characters who are repulsed by themselves, or who are themselves repulsive." She argued that this novel "instead builds a façade of beauty and privilege around her characters, forcing the reader to locate repulsion somewhere deeper: in effort, in daily living, in a world that swings between tragic and banal."

The novel is "tuned to a hyper-contemporary frequency," Tolentino wrote, with the narrator's indifference to real-life events highlighting the way her plan for self-improvement by tuning out the world contrasts with "the oft-preached mandates of authenticity or engagement". (At the same time, Tolentino suggested, "There is something in this liberatory solipsism that feels akin to what is commonly peddled today as wellness.")

Critics frequently commented on the "blackly funny" tone of the novel, though in The Guardian, Anthony Cummins noted that "by the end, this comically adversarial narrative" has expanded well beyond comedy, "hitting multiple marks at once: as an art-school prank, a between-the-lines tale of displaced grief and a pitiless anatomy of gender injustice, it also offers (via the inevitable 9/11 ending) a dark state-of-America fable." Accordingly, critics varied in their interpretation of the novel's themes. While some readers interpreted it as a critique of capitalism or an examination of "self-care", Stoner pointed to "an anachronistic belief in the sanctity of art...a faith in the power of art to rouse us, to make us believe that, though the world may feel intolerable, it remains worthwhile to '[dive] into the unknown ... wide awake.'"

== Reception ==
In Slate, Laura Miller praised the novel, saying, "Moshfegh excels here at setting up an immediately intriguing character and situation, then amplifying the freakishness to the point that some rupture feels inevitable." Publishers Weekly found the book "captivating and disquieting...showcas[ing] Moshfegh's signature mix of provocation and dark humor." Several reviews, including Miller and Publishers Weekly, felt "the novel drags a bit in the middle", though the ending was widely praised, with Miller saying Moshfegh "found a more satisfying way to resolve the plot" in My Year of Rest and Relaxation than in her first novel, Eileen.

Reviewing the novel in The New Yorker, Jia Tolentino wrote, "Ottessa Moshfegh is easily the most interesting contemporary American writer on the subject of being alive when being alive feels terrible." In The New York Times, Dwight Garner was more hesitant in his praise, but ultimately concluded: "Moshfegh writes with so much misanthropic aplomb, however, that she is always a deep pleasure to read. She has a sleepless eye and dispenses observations as if from a toxic eyedropper."

In a starred review, Kirkus Reviews described the novel as "A nervy modern-day rebellion tale that isn’t afraid to get dark or find humor in the darkness."

== Adaptations ==
In 2018, LuckyChap Entertainment and Atlas Entertainment bought the film adaptation rights to the book. LuckyChap's Margot Robbie was set to produce, alongside her husband Tom Ackerley. A German-language stage adaptation, Mein Jahr der Ruhe und Entspannung, premiered in 2020 in Zürich, Switzerland, directed by Yana Ross.
