= Lapvona =

2022 novel by Ottessa Moshfegh

- First edition (US)
- Author: Ottessa Moshfegh
- Language: English
- Publisher: Penguin Press (US); Jonathan Cape (UK)
- Publication date: June 21, 2022
- Publication place: United States
- Media type: Print, e-book, audiobook
- Pages: 320
- ISBN: 978-0-5933-0026-8 (hardcover)
- Preceded by: Death in Her Hands

Lapvona is a 2022 novel by Ottessa Moshfegh. It is Moshfegh's fourth novel.

== Synopsis ==
In Lapvona, a corrupt medieval fiefdom, deformed 13-year-old Marek lives with his cruel shepherd father Jude, believing his mother died giving birth to him. One of Marek’s few consolations is his enduring bond with the blind village midwife, Ina, who suckled him when he was a baby. For some people, Ina’s ability to receive transmissions of sacred knowledge from the natural world is a godsend, but others see her home in the woods as a godless place. When Marek commits a crime, the depraved governing lord Villiam demands that Jude hand the boy over as reparations, and Marek is forced to live in the governing family's castle. Suddenly thrust into aristocratic life, Marek is caught in a terrifying power struggle of corruption and debauchery.

== Background ==
Lapvona was written by Moshfegh during the COVID-19 pandemic and was announced on April 12, 2021. The novel was published by Penguin Press on June 21, 2022.

== Reception ==
In a review for the New York Times, Dwight Garner criticized the novel for lacking Moshfegh's typical wit, and that it is "narrow in its emotional range, a bleak, meandering and muddy-soled mix of fairy tale and folk horror." Kirkus Reviews compared the novel to Moshfegh's earlier works and found the tone "stiff" and the plot "meandering". The reviewer at Publishers Weekly, however, found the book "deliriously quirky" and declared it "a triumph".
