= Menmuir (disambiguation) =

Menmuir is a parish in the county of Angus in Scotland, UK.

Menmuir may also refer to:

- John Lindsay of Balcarres, Lord Menmuir (1552–1598), Secretary of State for Scotland
- Wyl Menmuir (1979–), author of the novel The Many, longlisted for the 2016 Man Booker Prize
