= Graeme Macrae Burnet =

Scottish author and Booker Prize nominee

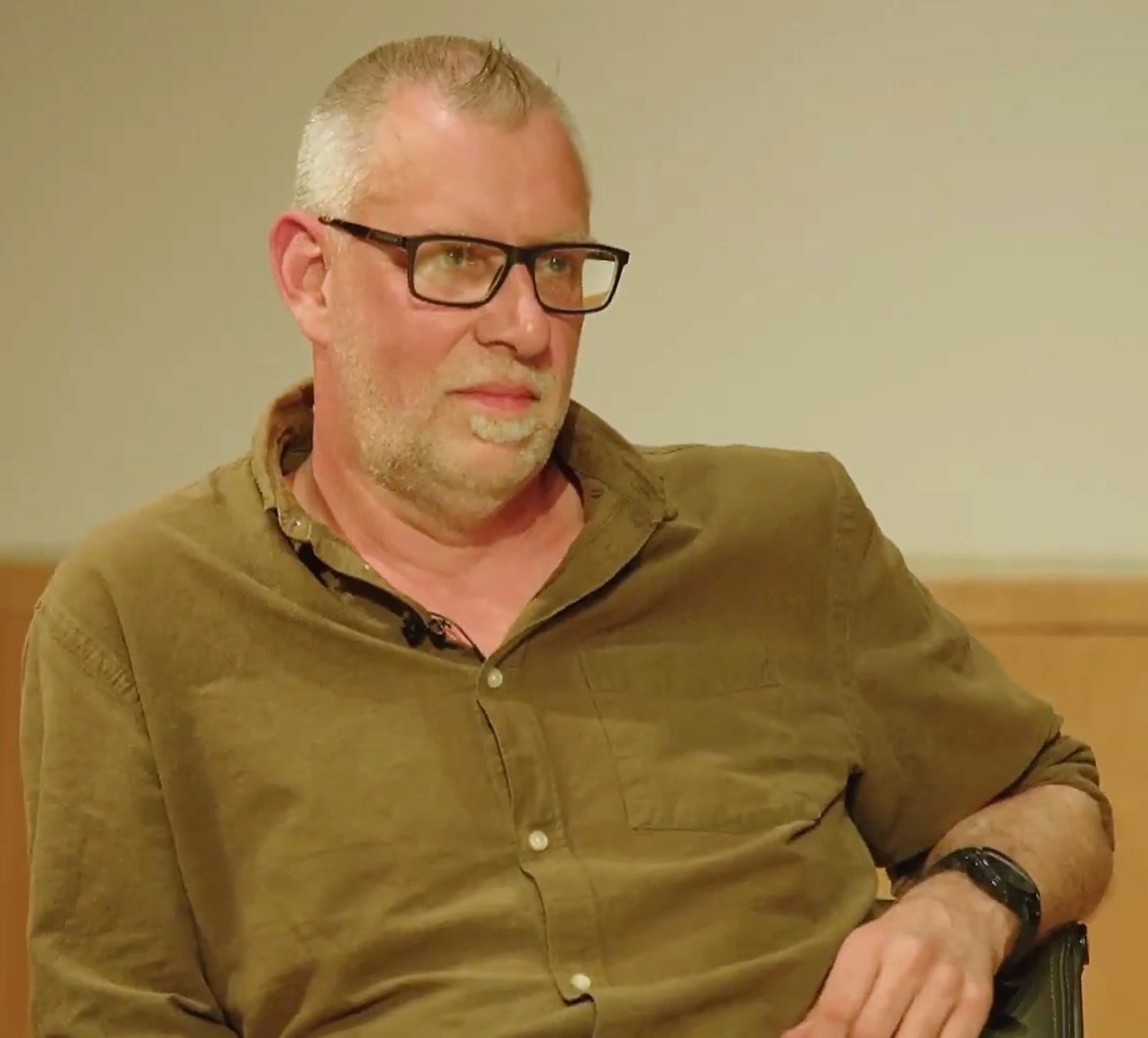
- Burnet at The British Library in 2022
- Born: 1967 (age 58–59); Kilmarnock, Scotland
- Education: Glasgow University; University of St Andrews
- Occupation: Novelist
- Writing career
- Notable works: The Disappearance of Adèle Bedeau (2014); His Bloody Project (2015) (2015)
- Website: graememacraeburnet.wordpress.com

Graeme Macrae Burnet (born October 1967) is a Scottish writer. He writes literary crime novels, often with a metafictional framework. His first novel, The Disappearance of Adèle Bedeau, won the Scottish Book Trust New Writer Award in 2013. His second novel, His Bloody Project (2015), won the Saltire Society Fiction Book of the Year Award and was shortlisted for the 2016 Man Booker Prize. In 2017, he won the Author of the Year category in the Sunday Herald Culture Awards. His novel Case Study (2021) was longlisted for the Booker Prize. In 2026, his novel Benbecula was shortlisted for the Walter Scott Prize.

== Personal life ==
Burnet was born in Kilmarnock, Scotland, in 1967. On his mother's side, he has family ties to the northwest Highlands. He studied film and English literature in Glasgow and the University of St Andrews and worked in television and taught overseas before becoming a full-time writer. He lives in Glasgow.

== Career ==
Burnet's first novel, The Disappearance of Adèle Bedeau, was published by Contraband, the crime imprint of Scottish publisher Saraband, in 2014. It is the first of his Georges Gorski trilogy, featuring a chief of police of that name and set in the Alsace town of Saint-Louis. All the books in the trilogy include a framework of forewords and/or afterwords presenting them as translations of works by a French author, Raymond Brunet. The Herald described the novel as "a captivating psychological thriller ... very accessible and thoroughly satisfying."

Burnet's second novel, His Bloody Project, was published by Contraband in 2016. Purporting to be based on found documents, it tells the story of a triple murder in a remote Scottish Highland community during the 1860s. The novel won the 2016 Saltire Society Fiction Book of the Year Award. It was shortlisted for the Man Booker Prize and the Los Angeles Times Book Prize for Mystery/Thriller. The novel outsold the other five Booker shortlisted novels put together during the shortlist period and went on to sell 200,000 copies in the UK and to be translated into more than 20 languages. The Dutch translation by Anne Jongeling, Zijn bloedige plan, won the 2017 Vrij Nederland Thriller of the Year Award. The French translation by Julie Sibony, L'accusé du Ross-Shire, was shortlisted for the 2017 European Crime Fiction Prize. The Telegraph's Jake Kerridge described the novel as "an astonishing piece of writing". The Guardian stated that the novel "richly deserves the wider attention the Booker has brought it".

The Accident on the A35 is the second in the Georges Gorski trilogy that began with The Disappearance of Adèle Bedeau. In The Guardian, Mark Lawson described it as continuing Burnet's experimentation with a genre that might be called "false true crime". Lawson praised the novel's pleasant recreation of "a France of francs and call boxes" and its "successive expectation reversals" but noted "stretches of prose that it's hard to believe really were composed by a Man Booker prize-shortlisted author". The book was longlisted for the Theakston Old Peculier Crime Novel of the Year Award 2018 and the Hearst Big Book Awards – Harpers Bazaar Modern Classics 2018.

Burnet's next novel, Case Study, was published by Saraband in 2021 and was longlisted for the 2022 Booker Prize and the Dublin Literary Award. Its metafictional framework involves "a series of notebooks apparently sent to the author in 2020 to aid his research into a rogue 1960s psychotherapist".

Published by Saraband in 2024, A Case of Matricide is the third in the Georges Gorski trilogy. Like the previous books in the series, it features a metafictional framework presenting the novel as the work of deceased author Raymond Brunet. The Times Literary Supplement praised the vivid characterisation, comedy, and unshowy prose, calling the trilogy "remarkable".

In October 2025 Polygon published Benbecula, part of Birlinn’s Darkland Tales series, which sees Scottish writers re-imagine episodes from the country’s history and legends. Unlike Burnet's other books, this one is based on real historical documents. Set on the island of Benbecula, the novella fictionalises an 1857 triple murder and is narrated by the killer’s brother. The novel was shortlisted for the 2026 Walter Scott Prize.

== Awards and selected recognition ==
- New Writer's Award from the Scottish Book Trust for The Disappearance of Adèle Bedeau
- Longlisted for the Waverton Good Read Award for The Disappearance of Adèle Bedeau
- Shortlisted for the 2016 Los Angeles Times Book Awards of Mystery/Thriller for His Bloody Project
- Shortlisted for the 2016 Man Booker Prize for His Bloody Project
- Winner of 2016 Saltire Society Fiction Book of the Year Award for His Bloody Project
- Shortlisted for the 2017 European Crime Fiction Prize for His Bloody Project
- Vrij Nederland Thriller of the Year Award for His Bloody Project
- Longlisted for the 2018 Theakston Old Peculier Crime Novel of the Year for The Accident on the A35
- Longlisted for the 2022 Booker Prize for Case Study
- Shortlisted for the 2026 Walter Scott Prize for Benbecula

== Bibliography ==
=== Gorski trilogy ===
- —— (2014). The Disappearance of Adèle Bedeau (paperback 1st ed.). Saraband. ISBN 9781908643605.
- —— (2017). The Accident on the A35 (paperback 1st ed.). Saraband.
- —— (2024). A Case of Matricide (hardcover 1st ed.). Saraband.

=== Other ===
- —— (2015). His Bloody Project (1st ed.). Contraband. The first edition was a "paperback original."
- —— (2021). Case Study (1st ed.). Saraband. ISBN 9781913393199.
- —— (2025). Benbecula (1st ed.). Polygon (Birlinn). ISBN 9781846977312.
