= Homesick for Another World =

2017 short story collection by Ottessa Moshfegh

- First edition
- Author: Ottessa Moshfegh
- Language: English
- Publication date: January 17, 2017
- Publication place: United States
- Media type: Print (Penguin Press)
- Pages: 304
- ISBN: 978-0-399-56288-4

Homesick for Another World is a collection of fourteen short stories by American author Ottessa Moshfegh. The book was published in 2017 by Penguin Press. It was a selection of Book of the Month.

== Stories ==
=== “Bettering Myself” ===
A depressed, alcoholic teacher drifts through her job and life in New York, reflecting on failed relationships and lost ambitions, until she decides to make a small change by quitting her job — not necessarily to get better, but to do something.

=== “Mr. Wu” ===
A lonely Chinese man, Mr. Wu, fixates on a woman who works at a video arcade. His obsession grows increasingly uncomfortable and delusional, revealing his deep isolation and distorted view of love and connection.

=== “Malibu” ===
A man on the fringe of society recounts a bizarre and aimless trip to Malibu, highlighting his grotesque behavior, substance abuse, and casual cruelty. His disconnection from reality underscores a life adrift.

=== “The Weirdos” ===
A dysfunctional couple obsessed with physical appearances plans to take mushrooms together. Their toxic relationship and mutual vanity unravel in grotesque and comedic ways, exposing their emptiness.

=== “A Dark and Winding Road” ===
A man retreats to his brother’s cabin for a weekend, hoping for solitude. Instead, he encounters his brother’s drugged-out friend, leading to a surreal, tense, and emotionally charged night that dredges up sibling resentment.

=== “No Place for Good People” ===
A widower reflects on his time working in a group home for disabled adults. One client wishes to go to Hooters for their birthday, but the widower takes them to a family friendly restaurant, much to their displeasure.

=== “Slumming” ===
A privileged schoolteacher spends summers in a poor rural town, doing drugs and eating submarine sandwiches. She views the locals with disdain but also fascination, exposing her moral decay and hypocrisy. She hires a pregnant woman to clean her rental house, but a complication arises.

=== “An Honest Woman” ===
An aging man becomes fixated on his attractive new neighbor. He invites her over, hoping for romance, but their interaction turns uncomfortable and predatory, revealing his warped perception and loneliness.

=== “The Beach Boy” ===
A wealthy older couple’s return after a trip to a resort takes a sudden turn when the wife dies unexpectedly. The widower soon discovers her secret double life, prompting a sharp commentary on marriage, grief, and denial.

=== “Nothing Ever Happens Here” ===
A young man moves from Utah to LA hoping to pursue acting, but he gets stuck working at a pizza parlor and becomes infatuated with a girl. He ignores his real mother and instead seeks out the nurturing encouragement of his elderly landlady, a Hollywood gossip columnist who lost her parents in the Holocaust.

=== “Dancing in the Moonlight” ===
A man aging out of his “Jesus Year” of 33 falls in love with a furniture refurbisher. He fantasizes a sharing a life with her more cohesive than his own, so he purchases an ottoman online for her to refurbish with unsatisfying results.

=== “The Surrogate” ===
A woman works as a paid surrogate vice president for a company owned by a Chinese family. She feels loved by them, but struggles with her own body image and the “demons” that haunt her surrounding a physical deformity.

=== “The Locked Room” ===
A woman reflects on her unstable childhood and the emotional scars left by her parents, especially her distant father. As she grows, her relationships are shaped by trauma and a longing for control.

=== “A Better Place” ===
Two bizarre, otherworldly children believe they’ve been born into the wrong world and search for a portal to return “home.” The story ends violently, blurring the line between fantasy and psychosis.

== Contents ==
Story	Originally published in
"Bettering Myself"	The Paris Review
"Mr. Wu"	The Paris Review
"Malibu"	Vice
"The Weirdos"	The Paris Review
"A Dark and Winding Road"	The Paris Review
"No Place for Good People"	The Paris Review
"Slumming"	The Paris Review
"An Honest Woman"	The New Yorker
"The Beach Boy"	The New Yorker
"Nothing Ever Happens Here"	Granta
"Dancing in the Moonlight"	The Paris Review
"The Surrogate"	Vice
"The Locked Room"	The Baffler
"A Better Place"	Original

== Reception ==
Writing in The New York Times, novelist David Means wrote, "Moshfegh quickly established herself as an important new voice in the literary world, and her concerns for those isolated not only in the margins of society but within the physical confines of the body itself mirrored the work of brilliant predecessors like Mary Gaitskill, Christine Schutt and, in some ways, Eileen Myles."

Christian Lorentzen, reviewing the collection in Vulture, wrote, "The stories in Homesick for Another World are mostly marvels, but none of them are marvels of plot. Voice, mood, atmosphere, and the piercing detail are the native elements of her arsenal."

Author and Tin House co-founder Elissa Schappell, writing in The Los Angeles Times, compared Moshfegh's style to Flannery O'Connor.
