= Ottessa Moshfegh =

American author (born 1981)

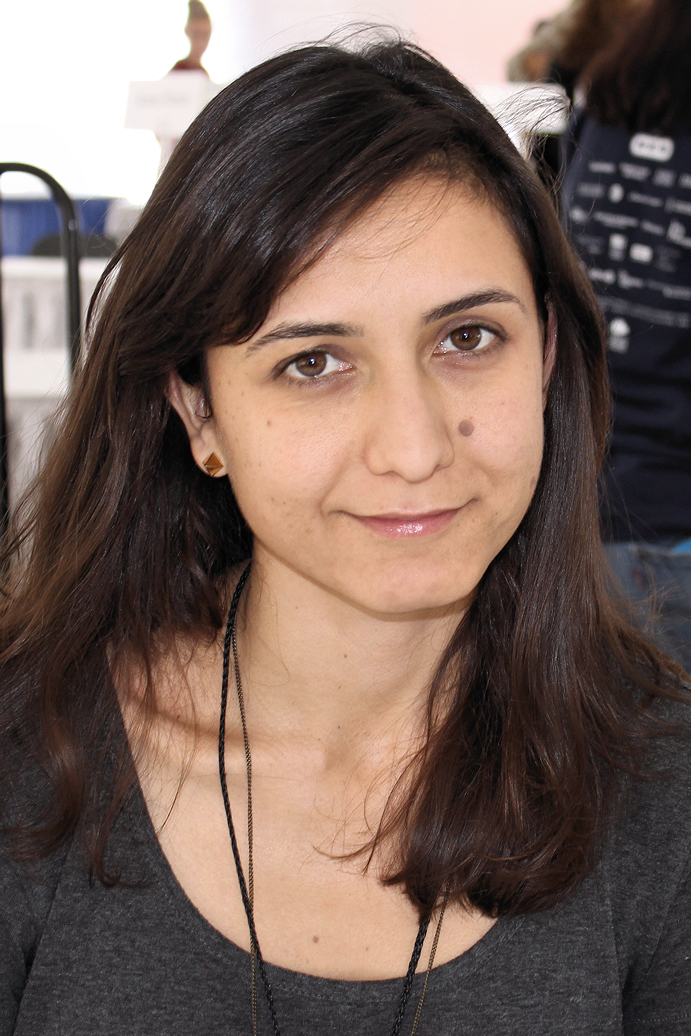
- Moshfegh at the 2015 Texas Book Festival
- Born: Ottessa Charlotte Moshfegh; May 20, 1981 (age 45); Boston, Massachusetts, U.S.
- Education: Barnard College (BA); Brown University (MFA)
- Occupations: Novelist; writer
- Writing career
- Genres: Fiction; essays
- Notable works: Eileen; My Year of Rest and Relaxation

Ottessa Charlotte Moshfegh (/oʊˈtɛsə ˈmɒʃfɛɡ/; born May 20, 1981) is an American author, novelist and screenwriter. Her debut novel, Eileen (2015), won the Hemingway Foundation/PEN Award, was shortlisted for the Booker Prize, and was a fiction finalist for the National Book Critics Circle Award. Moshfegh's subsequent novels include My Year of Rest and Relaxation, Death in Her Hands, and Lapvona.

== Early life and education ==
Moshfegh was born in 1981 and raised in Boston, Massachusetts. Her mother was Croatian and her father an Iranian Jew and both were musicians who taught at the New England Conservatory of Music. As a child, Moshfegh learned to play piano and clarinet.

Moshfegh attended the Commonwealth School in Boston and earned a BA in English from Barnard College in 2002. In 2011, she completed an MFA in Literary Arts at Brown University, where she also taught undergraduates. From 2013 to 2015, Moshfegh was a Wallace Stegner Fellow in fiction at Stanford University.

== Career ==
After college, Moshfegh moved to Wuhan, China, where she taught English and worked in a punk bar. In her mid-twenties, she relocated to New York City, working for Overlook Press and later as an assistant to Jean Stein. After contracting cat-scratch fever, she left the city and pursued an MFA at Brown University. During those years, she supported herself by selling vintage clothing, which she has described as mostly "tea dresses."

=== Works ===
In 2014, Fence Books published Moshfegh's novella McGlue, the first winner of the Fence Modern Prize in Prose. In August 2015, Penguin Press published her first full-length novel, Eileen, which received favorable reviews and was shortlisted for the 2016 Man Booker Prize. In Eileen, the protagonist and narrator recounts a series of events from her youth in a Massachusetts town she calls "X-ville". At the start of the novel, she works as a secretary at a local juvenile prison while living with and caring for her abusive father, a retired police officer struggling with alcoholism and paranoia. As the story continues, the circumstances that led her to leave X-ville are revealed.

Homesick for Another World, a collection of short stories, was published in January 2017. On July 10, 2018, Penguin Press published Moshfegh's second novel, My Year of Rest and Relaxation. The book describes a young art history graduate living in New York City over a 15-month period starting in mid-June 2000. Recently graduated and ambivalently mourning her parents' deaths, she quits her job as a gallerist and embarks on a yearlong plan to sleep, aided by sleeping pills and other medications prescribed by a dubious psychiatrist.

Also in 2018, Moshfegh wrote a piece for Granta in which she recounted an experience with a much older male writer when she was 17 years old. She is a frequent contributor to the Paris Review, having published eight stories in the journal since 2012. In 2020, Vintage published her third novel, Death in Her Hands, which Moshfegh has called "a loneliness story".

In 2021, Moshfegh's short story "My New Novel" was published as a stand-alone artbook by Picture Books, an imprint of Gagosian. The book features a foldout painting by Issy Wood illustrating "the most directly surreal part of the story". In 2022, Penguin Press published Moshfegh's fourth novel, Lapvona, which follows Marek, the abused son of a shepherd, along with other characters from the fictional medieval fiefdom of Lapvona.

Moshfegh co-wrote the 2022 drama film Causeway with Luke Goebel and Elizabeth Sanders. It premiered at the 2022 Toronto International Film Festival.

== Personal life ==
Moshfegh was married to the writer Luke B. Goebel, whom she met during an interview. As of 2020, they were living in Pasadena, California. She has cited the poet and novelist Charles Bukowski as an influence on her work. Like Moshfegh, Bukowski created characters who were considered socially deprived and isolated. In 2026, Moshfegh announced she and Goebel were separated.

== Awards and honors ==
- 2013–15 Wallace Stegner Fellowship at Stanford University
- 2013 Plimpton Prize for Fiction from The Paris Review for her story "Bettering Myself"
- 2014 Believer Book Award winner for McGlue
- 2016 MacDowell Colony Fellowship
- 2016 Hemingway Foundation/PEN Award for Eileen
- 2016 Man Booker Prize (shortlist) for Eileen
- 2018 The Story Prize finalist for Homesick for Another World

== Bibliography ==
=== Novels ===
- Eileen (2015)
- My Year of Rest and Relaxation (2018)
- Death in Her Hands (2020)
- Lapvona (2022)
- Only Children (2027)

=== Short fiction collections ===
- Homesick for Another World (2017)

=== Novellas ===
- McGlue (2014)
- My New Novel (2021)

== Filmography ==
- Causeway (2022; co-written with Luke Goebel & Elizabeth Sanders)
- Eileen (2023; based on her novel; co-written with Luke Goebel)
- The Three Incestuous Sisters (TBA; co-written with Alice Rohrwacher)
