= The Sellout (novel) =

2015 novel by Paul Beatty

The Sellout: A Novel
- First edition cover
- Author: Paul Beatty
- Illustrator: Matt Buck
- Cover artist: Rodrigo Corral
- Language: English
- Genre: Fiction
- Publisher: Farrar, Straus and Giroux
- Publication date: March 3, 2015
- Publication place: United States
- Media type: Print (Hardback)
- Pages: 304 pp.
- ISBN: 978-0374260507

The Sellout is a 2015 novel by Paul Beatty published by Farrar, Straus and Giroux, and in the UK by Oneworld Publications in 2016. The novel takes place in and around Los Angeles, California, and muses about the state of racial relations in the U.S. today. In October 2016, it won the Booker Prize, making Beatty the first American writer to win that award.

== Background ==
Published in 2015, The Sellout was the latest in Paul Beatty's body of work that explores racial identity in the United States and the pervasive historical effects of racism. Beatty's other notable works include The White Boy Shuffle, Tuff, and Slumberland. Beatty has stated his motivation for writing the novel was that "[he] was broke". Although The Sellout was not written in response to any specific event, the novel was released during a time of racial reckoning surrounding multiple instances of police brutality and the Ferguson, Missouri protests.

== Plot summary ==
The narrator and most of the characters are African-Americans in an urban farming area in the fictional town of Dickens, California. The story begins with the narrator (referred to as either "me" or "Bonbon") standing trial before the Supreme Court for crimes related to his attempt to restore slavery and segregation in his hometown of Dickens, an "agrarian ghetto" on the outskirts of Los Angeles, California. Sitting before the court, Bonbon starts to reflect on what led up to this moment and recounts his upbringing. Bonbon had a tenuous relationship with his father, an unorthodox sociologist who performed numerous traumatizing social experiments on him as a child and held lofty expectations for Bonbon to become a respected community leader in Dickens. A few years before the Supreme Court case, Bonbon's father is murdered by the police, after which Bonbon struggles to find his identity and a purpose in life. At first, Bonbon is content to withdraw from the community and continue his agricultural endeavors of growing artisanal watermelons and marijuana without his father’s judgement.

One day, however, the town of Dickens spontaneously disappears from the map and becomes unincorporated, a change that Bonbon attributes to Dickens' undesirable socioeconomic and racial demographics. Bonbon sets out to restore Dickens' existence through any means possible. Bonbon enlists the help of Hominy Jenkins, an old man and former child actor, to paint provocative road signs and boundary lines that draw attention to Dickens’ existence. After those attempts are fruitless, Bonbon continues a step further and attempts to reinstitute both slavery and segregation in Dickens and bring back what he believes to be a unifying power structure in the town. He first attempts to re-segregate a public bus driven by his ex-girlfriend by posting "white-only signs" in the front of the bus. He later tries to open an all-white school next to the local high school. Meanwhile, Hominy offers to become Bonbon's slave, to which a reluctant Bonbon eventually agrees. As the absurdity of Bonbon's actions are noticed on a wider scale, Hominy causes a large accident that ultimately leads to the Supreme Court case.

== Genre ==
The Sellout is a fictitious, satirical novel about racial relations in the U.S. Beatty utilizes stereotypes and parody throughout the story to inject social commentary. Beatty's other works are mostly humorous as well, but Beatty has claimed that he does not view himself as a satirical author.

== Analysis ==
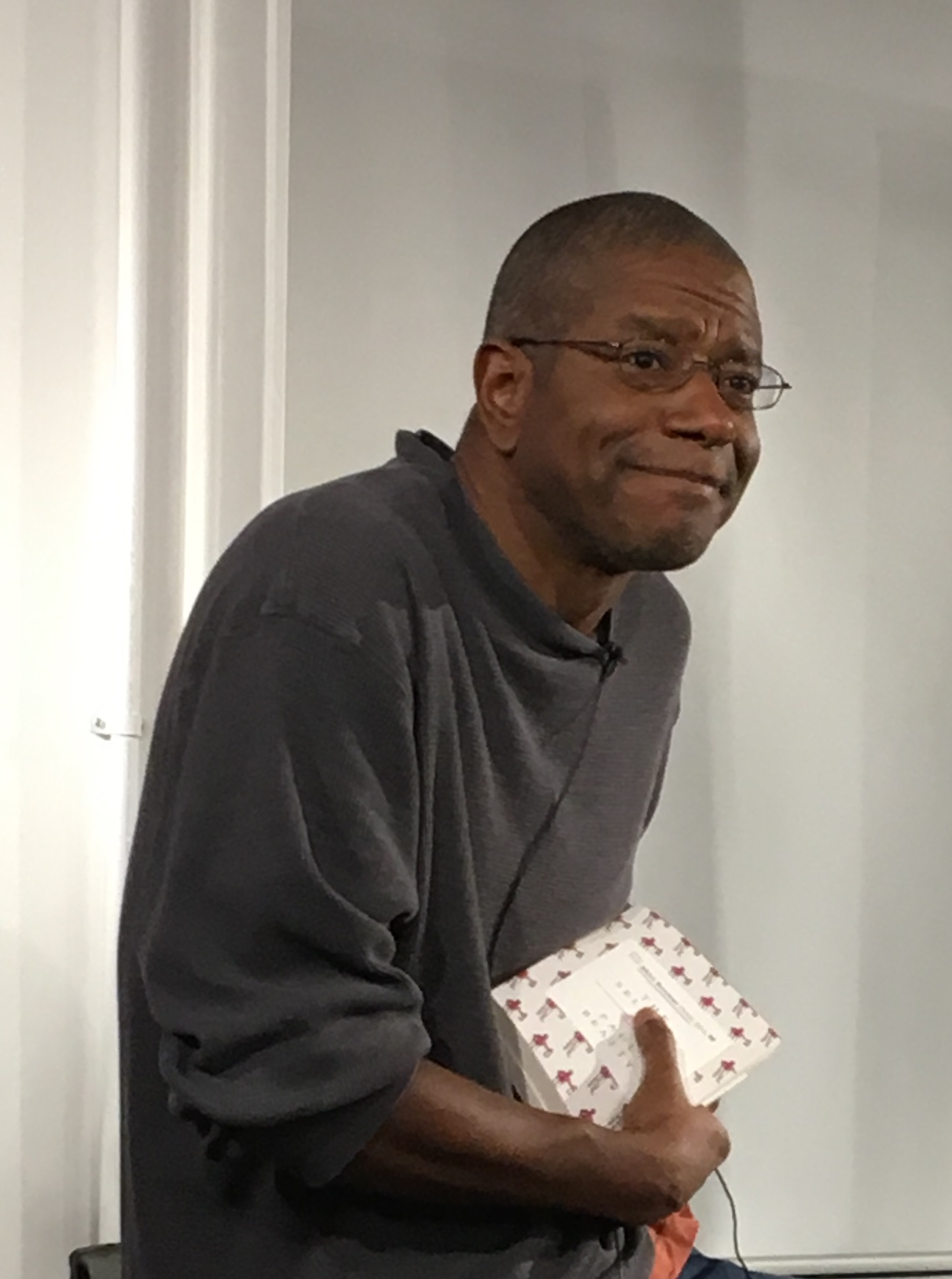
Beatty in 2016, holding a copy of The Sellout.

The Sellout has been seen by many as a critique of the idea that American society is post-racial. According to literary scholar Henry Ivry, the satirical devices used throughout the book bring attention to the current issues of systemic racism and mock the conventional approaches that American society has taken to remedy these issues. Similarly, University of Albany professor Steven Delmagori notes that the pointed comedy in the novel establishes white privilege as a central issue facing American society, but Beatty simultaneously pokes fun at the overly individualistic view that has dominated the discourse around white privilege. Another scholar, Judit Friedrich, stipulates that Beatty's writing may seem taboo at first, but his flippant treatment of serious racial issues—from segregation to economic inequality—call out society's unwillingness to discuss and substantively address these issues.

== Reception ==
The novel was well received by critics, who praised its humor, ostensibly satirical content, and rich social commentary.

In The Guardian, Elisabeth Donnelly described it as "a masterful work that establishes Beatty as the funniest writer in America", while reviewer Reni Eddo-Lodge called it a "whirlwind of a satire", going on to say: "Everything about The Sellout's plot is contradictory. The devices are real enough to be believable, yet surreal enough to raise your eyebrows." The HuffPost concluded: "The Sellout is a hilarious, pop-culture-packed satire about race in America. Beatty writes energetically, providing insight as often as he elicits laughs." In Literary Review, Jude Cook described Beatty's narrator Me as irresistible, "a hip, irreverent, salty and above all militant voice," whose "absurdist, carnivalesque rants belie the penetrating social analysis beneath."

Historian Amanda Foreman, chair of the judges of the Man Booker prize, said:

"The Sellout is one of those very rare books that is able to take satire, which is in itself a very difficult subject and not always done well, and it plunges into the heart of contemporary American society and, with absolutely savage wit, of the kind I haven't seen since Swift or Twain, both manages to eviscerate every social taboo and politically correct, nuanced, every sacred cow, and while both making us laugh, making us wince. It is both funny and painful at the same time and it is really a novel of our times."

Beatty has indicated surprise that critics refer to the novel as a comic one, indicating his belief that discussing the comic aspects of the novel prevents critics from having to discuss its more serious themes.

=== Awards and honors ===
- 2016 National Book Critics Circle Award (Fiction), winner.
- 2016 Booker Prize, winner.

The Sellout was the first American book to win the prestigious Booker prize, an award traditionally reserved for English-language literature not from the United States. The contest began considering American literature in 2013. In 2024, it was listed #17 on The New York Times' 100 Best Books of the 21st Century list.

== Publication ==
The Sellout was published in 2015 by Farrar, Straus and Giroux and UK publishing house Oneworld Publications.
