= Paul Beatty =

American writer (born 1962)

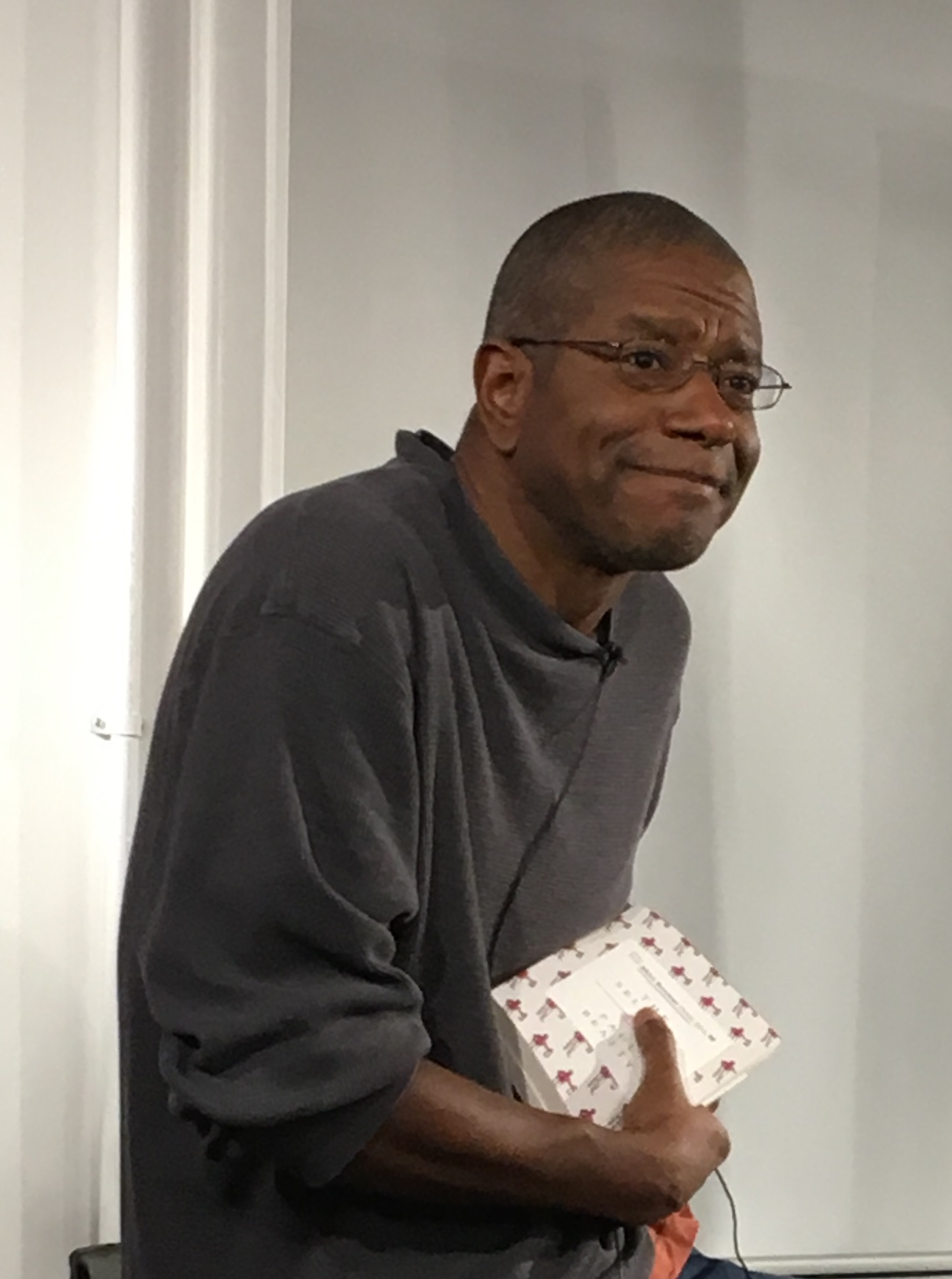
- Beatty in 2016
- Born: June 9, 1962 (age 64); Los Angeles, California, U.S.
- Education: Brooklyn College (MFA); Boston University (MA)
- Spouse: Althea Wasow
- Writing career
- Years active: 1990s–present
- Genres: Fiction, poetry
- Notable work: The White Boy Shuffle (1996); The Sellout (2015)
- Notable awards: 2015 National Book Critics Circle Award; 2016 Man Booker Prize

Paul Beatty (born June 9, 1962) is an American author and professor of writing at Columbia University. In 2016, he won the National Book Critics Circle Award and the Man Booker Prize for his novel The Sellout. It was the first time a writer from the United States was honored with the Man Booker.

== Early life and education ==
Paul Beatty was born in Los Angeles, California, in 1962. He grew up in West Los Angeles. He was raised by a single mother and did not have a relationship with his father. When he was younger, he was influenced by comedian Richard Pryor, and writers Joseph Heller and Kurt Vonnegut. In 1980, he graduated from El Camino Real High School in Woodland Hills, California. He went to Boston University for undergraduate and graduate schools, and received an MA degree in psychology in 1987. He later received an MFA degree in creative writing from Brooklyn College.

== Career ==
In 1990, Beatty was crowned the first ever Grand Poetry Slam Champion of the Nuyorican Poets Cafe. One of the prizes for winning the championship title was the book deal that resulted in his first volume of poetry, Big Bank Take Little Bank (1991). This was followed by another book of poetry, Joker, Joker, Deuce (1994), and appearances performing his poetry on MTV and PBS (in the series The United States of Poetry). In 1993, he was awarded a grant from the Foundation for Contemporary Arts Grants to Artists Award.

In 1996, he lived in Berlin, Germany, the same year that his first novel, The White Boy Shuffle, was published. White Boy Shuffle received a positive review from Richard Bernstein in The New York Times who called the book "a blast of satirical heat from the talented heart of Black American life." His second novel, Tuff (2000), received a positive notice in Time magazine, where it was described as being "like an extended rap song, its characters recounting struggle and survival with the bravado of hip-hoppers." In 2006, Beatty edited an anthology of African-American humor called Hokum and wrote an article in The New York Times on the same subject. His 2008 novel Slumberland was about an American DJ in Berlin, and reviewer Patrick Neate said: "At its best, Beatty's writing is shockingly original, scabrous and very funny."

In his 2015 novel The Sellout, Beatty chronicles an urban farmer who tries to spearhead a revitalization of slavery and segregation in a fictional Los Angeles neighborhood. In The Guardian, Elisabeth Donnelly described it as "a masterful work that establishes Beatty as the funniest writer in America", while reviewer Reni Eddo-Lodge called it a "whirlwind of a satire", going on to say: "Everything about The Sellout's plot is contradictory. The devices are real enough to be believable, yet surreal enough to raise your eyebrows." The book took more than five years to complete.

The Sellout was awarded the 2015 National Book Critics Circle Award for fiction, and the 2016 Man Booker Prize. Beatty is the first American to have won the Man Booker Prize, for which all English-language novels became eligible in 2014.

Beatty is a professor at Columbia University and has taught "Literature from Los Angeles" as part of the MFA writing program.

== Personal life ==
Beatty is married to filmmaker Althea Wasow, sister of BlackPlanet co-founder Omar Wasow.

== Awards and honors ==
- 2009: Creative Capital Award for Slumberland
- 2015: National Book Critics Circle Award (Fiction), winner for The Sellout.
- 2016: Booker Prize winner for The Sellout.
- 2017: International Dublin Literary Award long-list for The Sellout

== Works ==
=== Poetry ===
- Big Bank Take Little Bank (1991). Nuyorican Poets Cafe Press. ISBN 0-9627842-7-3
- Joker, Joker, Deuce (1994). ISBN 0-14-058723-3

=== Fiction ===
- The White Boy Shuffle (1996). ISBN 0-312-28019-X
- Tuff (2000). Alfred A. Knopf. ISBN 0-375-40122-9
- Slumberland (2008). Bloomsbury USA, ISBN 978-1596912410
- The Sellout (2015). New York: Farrar Straus Giroux. London: Oneworld Publications, 2016. ISBN 978-1786071477 (hardback), 978-1786070159 (paperback)

=== Edited volume ===
- Hokum: An Anthology of African-American Humor (2006). Bloomsbury USA. ISBN 978-1596911482
