= Jon Day (writer) =

British writer, critic and academic

Jon Day is a British writer, critic and academic. He teaches English at King's College London. His essays and reviews have appeared in the London Review of Books, n+1, the New York Review of Books, The Times Literary Supplement, and The Guardian. He is also a regular fiction critic for The Daily Telegraph and the Financial Times, and writes about art for Apollo magazine.

Day's first book, Cyclogeography, a philosophical memoir about the years he spent as a London bicycle courier, was published in 2015 to critical acclaim. His second, Homing, was published in 2019. He was a judge for the 2016 Man Booker Prize, and for the 2019 Wellcome Book Prize.
