= Eileen (film) =

2023 film by William Oldroyd

- Theatrical release poster
- Directed by: William Oldroyd
- Screenplay by: Luke Goebel; Ottessa Moshfegh
- Based on: Eileen by Ottessa Moshfegh
- Produced by: Anthony Bregman; Stefanie Azpiazu; Peter Cron; Luke Goebel; Ottessa Moshfegh; William Oldroyd
- Starring: Thomasin McKenzie; Shea Whigham; Marin Ireland; Owen Teague; Anne Hathaway
- Cinematography: Ari Wegner
- Edited by: Nick Emerson
- Music by: Richard Reed Parry
- Production companies: Fifth Season; Film4; Likely Story; Omniscient Films
- Distributed by: Neon (United States and Canada); Focus Features (International; through Universal Pictures)
- Release dates: January 21, 2023 (Sundance); December 1, 2023 (United States)
- Running time: 98 minutes
- Countries: United States; United Kingdom
- Language: English
- Box office: $1.7 million

Eileen is a 2023 psychological thriller film directed by William Oldroyd, based on the 2015 novel by Ottessa Moshfegh, who co-wrote the screenplay with her husband, Luke Goebel. A co-production between the United States and the United Kingdom, the film stars Thomasin McKenzie, Shea Whigham, Marin Ireland, Owen Teague, and Anne Hathaway. Set in 1960s Massachusetts, the story trails the relationship between two women working at a juvenile detention facility.

Eileen premiered at the Sundance Film Festival on January 21, 2023, and was released in select theaters in the United States on December 1, 2023, by Neon, before expanding wide a week later. It received positive reviews from critics and grossed $1.7 million at the box office.

== Plot ==
In 1964 Massachusetts, Eileen Dunlop works as a secretary at a corrections facility for teenage boys. At work, she is shunned by her colleagues and fantasizes about a guard named Randy. At home, she lives with her widowed father Jim. Formerly chief of police, Jim is an alcoholic, paranoid and emotionally abusive towards Eileen. She frequently daydreams about killing herself and her father.

After Rebecca Saint John, a new psychologist, joins the prison staff, Eileen is immediately drawn to Rebecca's intellectual conversation and glamorous appearance. Rebecca begins working with an inmate, Lee Polk, who was imprisoned for stabbing his father to death. Rebecca invites Lee's mother, Anne, to speak with her and Lee, but Anne soon leaves distraught after Lee refuses to speak with her. That evening, Rebecca invites Eileen to a local bar. Following a night of drinking and dancing, Rebecca kisses Eileen before leaving.

The next morning, Eileen wakes in her car to find that Jim has locked her out of the house. As she cleans up the car, a local policeman informs her of the neighbors' complaints about Jim's violent and erratic behavior. Consequently, Jim agrees to relinquish his gun to Eileen's care. At work, Eileen is upset to learn that Rebecca has left for the Christmas holiday. She spends the day sleeping at Rebecca's desk.

On Christmas Eve, Rebecca calls and invites Eileen over for drinks. They share a drink, but a panicked Rebecca reveals they are actually in the Polks' house. Earlier, suspecting that Lee was sexually abused by his father, Rebecca had arrived to question Anne. However, the conversation became heated, and following a scuffle during which they fell into the basement, Rebecca tied Anne up and drugged her. She plans to coerce Anne into admitting involvement in her son's abuse, with Eileen as a witness. Eileen reluctantly agrees to help, retrieving her father's gun from her car.

In the basement, Anne eventually breaks down. She admits being aware of the abuse after walking in on her husband in Lee's room. Feeling powerless to stop the abuse and enjoying her husband's renewed interest in her, Anne instead enabled her husband by giving Lee an enema and bathing him before he went to bed, to avoid infections from her husband having sex with her after raping their son.

As Anne finishes her story, Eileen shoots her in the shoulder; Eileen and Rebecca drug Anne into unconsciousness. Amid Rebecca's unease, Eileen suggests framing Jim for the shooting and running away together, confessing her love for Rebecca. The two load Anne into Eileen's car and agree to meet at Eileen's house. Rebecca does not show up, and as dawn breaks, Eileen drives to a remote forest and leaves the still-drugged Anne in her car, which fills with engine smoke. Eileen then returns to the main road and hitches a ride, smiling to herself as she leaves the town.

== Cast ==
- Thomasin McKenzie as Eileen Dunlop
- Anne Hathaway as Rebecca Saint John
- Shea Whigham as Jim Dunlop
- Marin Ireland as Mrs. Anne Polk
- Owen Teague as Randy
- Sam Nivola as Lee Polk
- Siobhan Fallon Hogan as Mrs. Murray
- Tonye Patano as Mrs. Stevens
- Peter McRobbie as Warden
- Peter Von Berg as Dr. Frye
- Jefferson White as Buck Warren

== Production ==
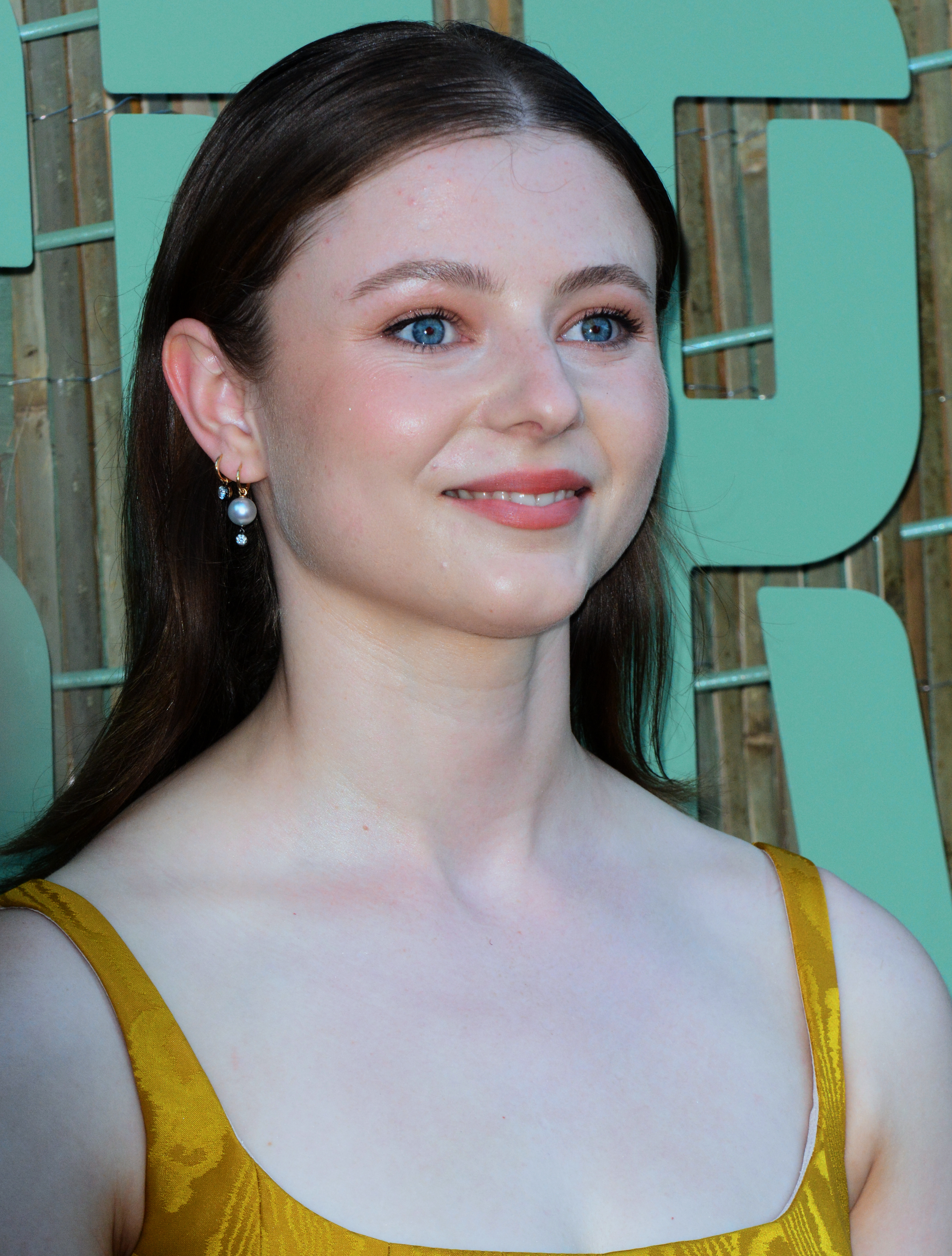
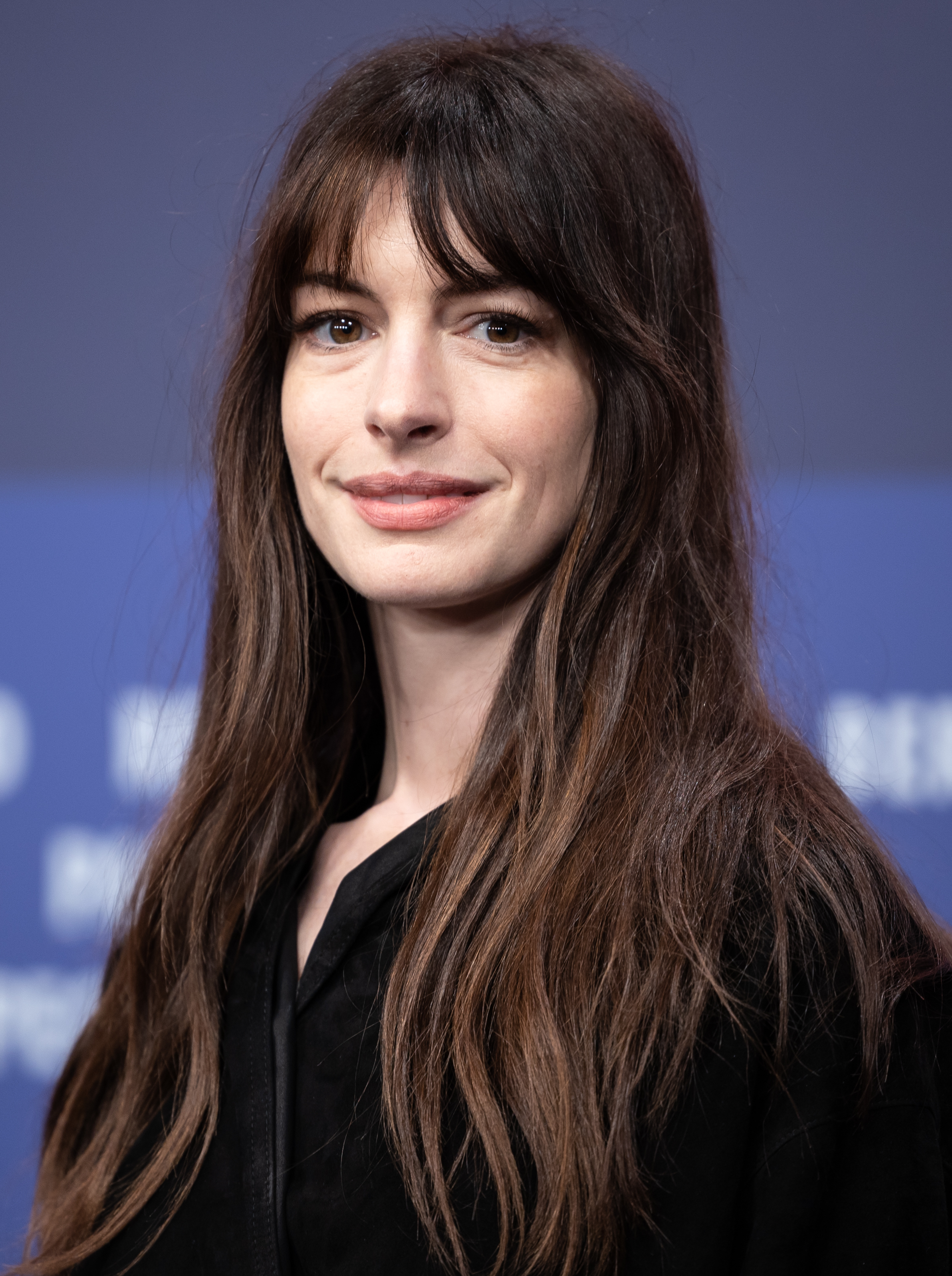
Thomasin McKenzie and Anne Hathaway starred in Eileen.

In August 2016, it was revealed that Erin Cressida Wilson was adapting the novel Eileen by Ottessa Moshfegh for Fox Searchlight and producer Scott Rudin. The novel was ultimately adapted by Moshfegh and her husband Luke Goebel, with Fox Searchlight no longer involved. The mayor of Metuchen, New Jersey, Jonathan Busch, first confirmed that Anne Hathaway, Thomasin McKenzie, and Shea Whigham would have roles in the film. Filming commenced in late 2021 in Metuchen with filming locations also including South Amboy, New Jersey. It was one of a succession of productions that Hathaway was filming in New Jersey in 2021 and 2022.

Principal photography on the production was completed in February 2022. It was confirmed that Owen Teague and Marin Ireland had been added to the cast and that Endeavor Content and WME Independent were selling distribution rights. Author of the novel and the screenplay Moshfegh was quoted as saying it was "a very faithful adaptation of the tone" of her original work. In June 2022, she confirmed the edit was locked-in and said that McKenzie as Eileen was "amazing. It's like she was born to play that role, she's just so exciting to watch. And Anne Hathaway plays Rebecca, the sort of femme fatale character. I mean, we're watching it again today and the first cut of it, I was like, 'This is so much better than my book.' So the movie is really satisfying, I'm excited about that." Moshfegh said bringing her writer husband Luke Goebel into the script writing process made the script better because he was able to add another perspective to the story. They began writing drafts during the height of the COVID-19 lockdown in 2020 and avoiding seasonal wildfires from Oregon to Pasadena to Palm Springs, with Moshfegh saying to Vanity Fair, "There was a sense of looming danger haunting us, which actually really helped the writing process." Hathaway described the project as "Carol meets Reservoir Dogs".

== Music ==
Richard Reed Parry of Arcade Fire composed the film's score. The film's soundtrack was released through Milan Records on December 1, 2023.

== Release ==
Eileen began a limited theatrical release in the United States on December 1, 2023, before expanding wide a week later (December 8). The film premiered at the 2023 Sundance Film Festival on January 21, 2023. In March 2023, Neon acquired North American distribution rights to the film for $15 million. In July 2023, Focus Features acquired worldwide distribution rights outside North America to the film, with its parent Universal Pictures handling distribution on its behalf and the film being slated for a theatrical release in the United Kingdom and Ireland on the same day as its limited release in the United States.

== Reception ==
On the review aggregator website Rotten Tomatoes, 81% of 209 critics' reviews are positive, with an average rating of 6.9/10. The website's consensus reads: "Anne Hathaway and Thomasin McKenzie prove a well-matched duo in Eileen, which honors its source material with a twisty tale of obsession." Metacritic, which uses a weighted average, assigned the film a score of 72 out of 100, based on 44 critics, indicating "generally favorable" reviews.

Following its premiere at Sundance, David Rooney of The Hollywood Reporter called Eileen "a film both malevolent and playful, morbidly funny and disturbing", commending the screenplay, direction, cinematography and cast performances. In his review for IndieWire, Ryan Lattanzio called it a "perverse folie à deux" and lauded the "immensely detailed" direction and cinematography, as well as the "career-best" performances of the leads. In Variety, Jessica Kiang called the film "wildly audacious, wondrously twisted" and "deliciously deranged", stating: "The moviemaking terminology is apt, because this is a film that is practically drunk on the possibilities of cinema, pumping a recklessly modern energy through a plethora of classical Hollywood genres […] It moves, sometimes sinuously, sometimes with lurching abruptness, from Sirkian romantic melodrama to film noir into black-comedy horror, coming to rest somewhere in the realms of one of the more effed-up Hitchcock thrillers."

In Rolling Stone, K. Austin Collins observed that "Eileen is quick enough on its feet that there's more pleasure than impatience to watching it spin its web somewhere in the direction of the obvious" and praised Oldroyd's direction in contrast to Todd Haynes' similar film Carol. In her review for Vox, Alissa Wilkinson remarked: "Eileen is the kind of drama that feels like it’s got dirt beneath its fingernails […] [It] is dank and disturbing and, when you’re in the mood for something that will mess you up, exactly right". Conversely, Benjamin Lee of The Guardian admired Hathaway's "pitch-perfect" performance, but revealed that he found himself "craving a little bit more oddity from a film, and characters, that hinted at a more daring and depraved destination".

Chris Burlingame of The SunBreak cited Eileen as among their favorite films of 2023, writing that the film "stays pretty true to its source, but holds up on its own as a thriller. The major plot twist managed to surprise me even though I already knew what it was and when it was coming."

=== Accolades ===
Award	Date of ceremony	Category	Recipient	Result	Ref.
Film Independent Spirit Awards	February 25, 2024	Best Supporting Performance	Anne Hathaway	Nominated	
Film Independent Spirit Awards	February 25, 2024	Best Supporting Performance	Marin Ireland	Nominated	
Film Independent Spirit Awards	February 25, 2024	Best Director	William Oldroyd	Nominated	
Golden Trailer Awards	May 30, 2024	Best Independent Trailer	Eileen: "Crazy"	Nominated	
Golden Trailer Awards	May 30, 2024	Best Motion/Title Graphics	Eileen: "Crazy"	Nominated	
