= Death in Her Hands =

2020 novel by Ottessa Moshfegh

- U.S. first edition cover
- Author: Ottessa Moshfegh
- Audio read by: Ann Marie Lee
- Language: English
- Genre: Psychological fiction; suspense fiction; mystery fiction
- Publisher: Penguin Press
- Publication date: June 23, 2020
- Publication place: United States
- Media type: Print, e-book, audiobook
- Pages: 272
- ISBN: 978-1-9848-7935-6 (hardcover)
- OCLC: 1110450886
- Dewey Decimal: 813/.6
- LC Class: PS3613.O77936 D43 2020

Death in Her Hands is a 2020 novel by Ottessa Moshfegh.

== Synopsis ==
Vesta Gul, a 72-year-old widow, is walking her dog in the woods and finds a note that reads: "Her name was Magda. Nobody will ever know who killed her. It wasn't me. Here is her dead body." However, no body is in sight. Vesta becomes obsessed with discovering who Magda was and the circumstances surrounding her death.

== Background ==
Death in Her Hands was originally scheduled to be published by Penguin Press on April 21, 2020, but was postponed due to the COVID-19 pandemic. The novel was ultimately published by Penguin Press on June 23, 2020.

== Reception ==
In its starred review, Kirkus Reviews called it an "eerie and affecting satire of the detective novel."

In a mixed review, Publishers Weekly criticized the novel's narrative as being overly unreliable and wrote that the novel "lacks the devious, provocative fun of Moshfegh's other work".
