= The White Boy Shuffle =

1996 debut novel by Paul Beatty

- Author: Paul Beatty
- Genre: Novel
- Publisher: Houghton Mifflin, Picador
- Publication date: 1996
- Media type: Print
- Pages: 226
- ISBN: 0-312-28019-X
- Dewey Decimal: 813'.54 dc21
- LC Class: PS3552.E19W45 1997

The White Boy Shuffle is the 1996 first novel of poet Paul Beatty. A satiric coming-of-age tale following the life of poet, basketball star, and self-described “Negro Demagogue” Gunnar Kaufman, it has been noted for its postmodern treatment of African-American gender and sexuality in addition to race.

== Plot summary ==
In the book's prologue, the reader meets the narrator, Gunnar Kaufman, a prolific African-American poet whose astronomically successful book, Watermelanin, has sold 126 million copies, elevating him to the status of "Negro Demagogue". The prologue asserts that what follows are Gunnar memoirs, "the battlefield remains of a frightened deserter in the eternal war for civility" (2). The novel opens with a comic survey of Gunnar's family tree, as his mother relates the tales of his family history to him and his sisters. Gunnar in turn regales his classmates with the tales of his ancestors, one of whom Gunnar claims dodged the bullet that eventually killed Crispus Attucks in the Boston Massacre. Gunnar is a young boy growing up in affluent, predominantly white Santa Monica, California, with his mother and sisters. His absent father is a sketch artist for the Los Angeles Police Department (LAPD) and rarely sees his children. Gunnar's friends are white, and he spends his free time making enough mischief to gain him mild admonishments from the Santa Monica Shore Patrol.

When Gunnar and his sisters tell their mother they do not want to attend an all-black summer camp because the children there "are different from us", Ms. Kaufman immediately packs up a U-Haul and relocates her family to the West Los Angeles neighborhood of Hillside, a predominantly black community surrounded by a concrete wall that Gunnar describes as the ghetto (37). In Hillside, the Kaufman children encounter an altogether different lifestyle than the one they were accustomed to in Santa Monica. Gunnar learns "the hard way that social norms in Santa Monica were unforgivable breaches of proper Hillside etiquette, and soon after arriving is beaten up by one of the area's local gangs, the "Gun Totin' Hooligans" (52).

Enrolling in the local junior high, Gunnar is offered protection by an administrator who fears that Gunnar's unfamiliarity with Hillside social norms will make him an easy target for harassment. However, Gunnar soon strikes up a friendship with Nicholas Scoby when he is paired with the "thuggish boy" in a reading of William Shakespeare's Othello (66). Scoby is a prodigious basketball player, with a remarkable ability to make, without exception, every basket. Soon after meeting Scoby, Gunnar stuns the local children when he unintentionally exhibits his own, heretofore unknown talent for basketball, dunking the ball into the basket in a pickup game. His talent gains him respect within the Hillside community of youths. Ironically, this unusual talent causes him to stick out enables him to fit into the social scene. Around this time, Gunnar writes his first poem, "Negro Misappropriation of Greek Mythology or, I know Niggers That'll Kick Hercules's Ass" and spray paints the lines across the concrete wall surrounding Hillside. Later, instructed by Scoby, Gunnar changes his hairstyle and attire in an effort to further conform to Hillside society.

As the years pass, Gunnar becomes incredibly popular, both for his talent on the basketball court and for his emerging poetic prowess. However, he remains somewhat of an outcast in his clear lack of dancing talent and his unease with women. His friends, Scoby and feared gang-member and assumed murderer Psycho Loco, dub Gunnar's awkward antics on the dance floor "The White Boy Shuffle". Because of Gunnar's apparent inability to talk to women, Psycho Loco secretly takes it upon himself to order Gunnar a mail-order bride from Japan, using a service called "Hot Mamma-Sans of the Orient". Throughout high school, Gunnar continues to write poetry, much of which, we later learn, is published in magazines.

During his sixteenth summer, Gunnar aids in his friends' stealing a department store safe during the turmoil of the 1992 Los Angeles Riots. We learn that Psycho Loco has planned to steal the safe for nine years in retribution for the department store's having moved a race-car set the young Psycho intended to steal on the day he was to steal it. As Gunnar and his friends attempt to load the safe into a car, Gunnar's father and other policemen arrive. Gunnar's father beats him with a nightstick, and Gunnar is hospitalized. When he is released from the hospital, he learns that his friends have been unable to open the safe. Gunnar turns the safe over, finding the combination on the bottom, and opens it. Gunnar refuses to take any of the money, gold, and precious stones inside. In the last two weeks of summer, Gunnar attends a program for the top 100 high school basketball talents in the country, of which Gunnar is number 100. From camp, he sends his friends and family several e-mails, which are documented in the novel. From these e-mails, we learn that both of Gunnar's sisters are pregnant and have moved in with their father. We also learn that Gunnar, despite his basketball talent, is not incredibly interested in the game itself. He is constantly frustrated by his roommates' insistence on constantly talking about the game. Gunnar notes that his roommates even use basketball terms to talk about women.

In return for his father not pressing charges against him and his friends for the safe incident, Gunnar agrees to attend an elite public high school in the San Fernando Valley. Gunnar travels an hour and a half to and from school on a bus. His return to a predominantly white atmosphere is an easy one, and Gunnar notes that he "meshed well" (153). However, he disdains the arrogance of several of the rich, white boys with whom his mother insists he spend time.

In his senior year, Gunnar begins receiving letters from the armed forces academies, Harvard University, and Boston University (BU). He visits a wealthy, African-American Harvard graduate in his large home, which overlooks Hillside, realizing that years earlier he and his Hooligan friends had stolen a security sign out of the front lawn and destroyed the man's RV. Gunnar is disgusted by the man's superior attitude towards the residents of Hillside and decides he will never attend Harvard. When a recruiter from BU arrives at his house, Gunnar decides to attend BU instead.

Before Gunnar leaves for college, it is revealed that Psycho Loco has indeed ordered Gunnar a wife from Japan when she arrives by UPS on Gunnar's 18th birthday. Yoshiko Katsu speaks little English but is an immediate hit with Gunnar's mother. For their honeymoon, Gunnar and Yoshiko drive to an amusement park, listening to the radio and attempting to bridge the gap between their two mother tongues.

Moving to Boston, Gunnar attends one class at BU: Creative Writing 104. When he tells the class his name, he is overwhelmed by a chorus of accolades as the students in the class recite his now famous poetry back to him and barrage him with questions. Uncomfortable with the attention, Gunnar runs from the room, tearing off his clothes and walking home to his apartment. At the insistence of his professor, who has followed him along with the members of the class, Gunnar agrees to publish a collection of his poetry. The collection will become his book, Watermelanin.

In Boston, Gunnar begins to face a degree of prejudice from other Black people for his marriage to the Japanese Yoshiko. At the insistence of Scoby, who is attending BU, Gunnar attends several meetings of student activist clubs such as the citywide black student union and SWAPO, or the Whities Against Political Obsequeiousness, of which he is the only black member. Waking simultaneously one night from dreams, Gunnar and Yoshiko realize that the latter is pregnant. Gunnar begins traveling on a basketball team with Scoby. He becomes increasingly depressed, and his only consolation are the boxes of Japanese literature sent to him on the road from Yoshiko. In return, Gunnar writes her letters. In these letters, he notes that Scoby "is going insane" (192).

After basketball season ends, Gunnar—now an even greater celebrity—is asked by his publisher to speak at a rally protesting BU's decision to confer an honorary degree upon a corrupt African statesman. Initially unsure of what to say to the crowd, Gunnar eventually tells the crowd that "What we need is some new leaders. Leaders who won't apostatize like cowards. Some niggers who are ready to die!" (200). The frenzied crowd chants "You! You! You!" and Gunnar's place as "Negro Demagogue" is solidified. From his speech, the media assumes that Gunnar is an advocate of freedom through suicide, and though Gunnar makes it clear that he means only his own suicide, many across America begin killing themselves and sending their "death poems" to Gunnar. When asked when he plans to commit suicide, Gunnar replies "When I'm good and goddamn ready" (202).

One night, on the beach, a deeply unhappy and depressed Scoby asks Gunnar what the highest building in Boston is before leaving the beach. The next morning Gunnar learns that Scoby has jumped from the roof of the BU law school, killing himself. On the roof, Gunnar finds his friend's suicide note, containing his own death poem.

Gunnar and Yoshiko resolve to return to Hillside, but Gunnar is forced into hiding by an outstanding warrant for his arrest by the LAPD. One night, on the beach with Psycho Loco and Yoshiko, Gunnar walks out into the ocean, realizes he could die if he swam out farther, and gives himself to the currents. Hit with thoughts of his unborn child, he snaps out of a meditative state underwater and swims back to shore. Gunnar and Yoshiko check into a motel, where the spend the remainder of the novel ostensibly hiding from the LAPD, occupying their time by having debates and reading death poems from Gunnar's fans. However, one night, Gunnar walks to 7-Eleven and is caught in a police helicopter's search light. The light follows him home. He and Yoshiko begin taking nighttime walks through Hillside, their way constantly lit by the helicopter. Eventually, they are joined by other members of the community on their walks.

With Gunnar's mother acting as midwife, Yoshiko gives birth to a girl, Naomi Katsu Kaufman, in a small pool in the local park. The birth is attended by a large crowd and is guarded by the members of the Gun Totin' Hooligans. As always, the LAPD helicopter hovers overhead. It drops a box of cigars attached to a parachute when Yoshiko gives birth. In what appears to be Gunnar's father's handwriting, a note is attached that reads: "Congratulations from the Los Angeles Police Department. Maybe this one will grow up with a respect for authority" (219).

As the novel comes to a close, Gunnar begins holding weekly, outdoor open mics, reading his poetry to great crowds. At one gathering, on the second anniversary of Scoby's suicide, Gunnar shocks the crowd by chopping off the smallest finger on his right hand with a kitchen knife. His sacrifice "cement[s] his status as savior of the blacks" (223). Elevating Gunnar to the status of cult figure, "spiteful black folks" travel in droves to Hillside, prompting the government to threaten the community with an ultimatum: "rejoin the rest of America or celebrate Kwanza in hell" (224). Hillside residents respond by painting the roofs of the community with white targets. The novel ends with Gunnar, still living in the motel with Yoshiko and Naomi, beginning to tell his daughter the same stories of his family tree told to him in his youth by his mother. The first such tale is that of Gunnar's father. The novel ends with his death poem, left in his LAPD locker before he kills himself by swallowing his own gun.

== Genre ==
The White Boy Shuffle is a fictional satirical piece framed around the Black messiah, Gunnar Kaufman. The novel falls under the new genres of New Black Aesthetic and Post Soul Aesthetic which are expanding the cultural representations of Blackness and giving legitimacy to new many possibilities of Black identity.

== Location ==
Santa Monica, the place where Gunnar and his family resided at the start of the novel, was known as a predominantly white neighborhood. It was a community that fell over to gentrification, especially in the late 1990s/early 2000s. Santa Monica was a place for leisure as a home to a number of retail, dining and entertainment venues and a large beach, where Gunnar spent a lot of time with friends. It is a large tourist location, boasting its fun and sunny location.

Hillside, known in the novel as the ghetto, was where a majority of African-American, Latino and Asian populations lived. The community is well known for all the wrong reasons. Their criminal gangs, high crime rate and lower-class economic bracket lend themselves to the bad reputation Hillside has. Gunnar's mother moves the Kaufman family to Hillside after her children claim that they are not like other black kids. They pack up their bags and immediately move to get a more black experience, as the mother believes.

== Themes ==
=== Identity ===
Gunnar is a cultural mulatto that frequently shifts between the white world and the Black world. Gunnar, like many of the cultural mulattos, is incapable of fitting in perfectly in either world. In the white world, he is very conscious of his blackness. And in the black world he is in constant unease trying to meet the expectations that are placed on him as messiah, basketball player, and representative. His mother relocates him and sisters so they can experience "a bitter taste of her vaunted 'traditional black experience'." He describes this shift living the black lifestyle like "being in a never-ending log-rolling contest".

In the beginning of the book, Beatty presents the genealogy of the Kaufman family. The Kaufman family tree consists of many sellouts to Blackness including: Swen Kaufman, who ran back into slavery, Franz von, the loving seeing eye human to his slavemaster, and Gunnar's father, Rolf Kaufman, a criminal sketch artist that has passively accepted racism and mistreatment all his life. The genealogy places Gunnar as the next traitor in a long line of disappointment, yet he becomes the Messiah of the Black community. It is debatable whether he fits within his genealogy or breaks the tradition and becomes a true leader of the Black community, because he incites a mass suicide of the Black community and is apathetic towards his role as leader.

=== Sexuality ===
- Gunnar is a nerd, an avid reader and very intelligent and self-aware. He plays two roles, poet and basketball player. His intellectualism is revered because he uses his poetry for the Black community as the Gun Totin’ Hooligans’ resident poet. He gains further acceptance as a talented basketball player. The role as a basketball player validates his masculinity, although he cannot approach females and he has no aggressive or violent tendencies.
- Psycho Loco is Hillside's resident gang leader of the Gun Totin’ Hooligans. They are aware of their performance of masculinity, and manipulate this expectation of them by cross-dressing for a surprise attack on a competing gang.

== Analysis ==
African-American studies scholar Mark Anthony Neal has suggested that Beatty's protagonist, Gunnar Kaufman, is "a reference to the Swedish ethnographer Gunnar Myrdal, who chronicled black life in An American Dilemma: The Negro Problem and Modern Democracy.

Beatty’s protagonist Gunnar Kaufman embodies the progression that Martin Luther King Jr. envisioned with the Civil Rights Movement. He is an African-American male who was raised in predominantly Caucasian environment without profound discrimination. Although the white community accepts him, he struggles to be accepting of his native African-American community. Even after his mother moves his family to Hillside, a notorious California ghetto, he initially does not connect to the "ghetto" lifestyle. He has notions of what life as an African-American should be like, but he has yet to live it. Gunnar is a chameleon that slowly but surely fits into almost every environment he is placed in. When Gunnar moves from the predominant white Hillside to a predominantly Black neighborhood he slowly changes "colors" and begins to represent everything that is considered to be "Black". However, it could just be Gunnar's environment that is shaping his personality and not his desire to conform. Gunnar did desire to be accepted in this new community but even if he did not desire to be accepted he was bound to retain some of the attributes of the people that were in his surroundings. Gunnar's friendship with these Black characters can be interpreted as the white person saying these are my "cool Black friends". Gunnar is no longer the "cool Black" friend he is the "white person" saying these are my "cool Black friends". Through the help of Scoby and Psycho Loco, he begins to fit into the black aesthetic, but superficial conforming does not change his innate personality. When his father forces him to return to a predominantly white school, he naturally reverts to his true self, one that does not see skin color as a barrier.

Beatty, writing Post-Civil Rights Movement and during the Black Arts Movement, creates a character that transcends racial barriers, as many African Americans at that time wished to do. He along with other activists redefined what it meant to be black. Beatty created a character that fit into a white community as equally well as a black community; he also marries and impregnates a Japanese woman. From Gunnar's encounter with the Harvard graduate, he learns that he is not interested in losing his true African-American self to become a pretentious imposter. The African-American community appoints him to the status of Negro Demagogue. They overlook the Caucasian environment that saturates the majority of his upbringing and his Japanese wife because at the end of the day, Gunnar is simply an African American male. This book proves that being raised in a ghetto or only having African-American friends are not the only qualification that one must fill to be considered "Black". Anyone can represent the African-American community, including well-spoken, well-educated black men and women. Paul Beatty's novel puts the foot in the door for a new Black being. It is a New Black Aesthetic.

=== Black exceptionality ===
The theme of black exceptionality is explored in the characters of Gunnar and Scoby. Both Gunnar and Scoby represent "the talented tenth", in that they escape Hillside and go on to higher education and promising futures. However, their successes are perceived differently by the white community. Scoby, the perfect Basketball player who is incapable of missing a basketball shot, is vilified and perceived as the pagan African demon with mystical powers. In contrast, Gunnar, a great player but not as good as Scoby, becomes "white society’s mercenary". He is accepted, tolerated, and claimed by whiteness, because of his lack of apparent blackness. Because Gunnar has never fulfilled the stereotypical "black" role, whites view him as less of a deviance from the hegemonic ideals. This is a larger commentary on where Blacks are allowed to be in the social hierarchy, and the limitations placed on their successes. Gunnar comments of the white community's treatment of Scoby, saying that "they would be a lot better off if they simply called Scoby a god and left it at that, it's no way they'll proclaim a skinny black man God."

This theme is also explored with regard to Gunnar's participation in both basketball and poetry. While Gunnar exceeds at both hobbies, he is especially invested in poetry. For him, playing basketball is not as inherently interesting as it is simply an activity that makes him popular, but poetry intrigued him before he really knew how to write it. In the book, Gunnar narrates: "It occurred to me that maybe poems are like colds. Maybe I would feel a poem coming on. My chest would grow heavier, my eyes watery; my body temperature would fluctuate, and a ringing in my ears would herald the coming of a timeless verse" (79). Through Gunnar's shifting interests, Beatty comments on the intersection between exceptionality and passion. While Gunnar is expected to be good at basketball to be a "real" black male, the satisfaction it brings him is only superficial and dependent on the gaze of others. Poetry, on the other hand, is a skill that Gunnar builds on his own. He eventually becomes so famous for his magnum opus, Watermelanin, that he unintentionally becomes a "Leader of the Black Community" (1). As a result, Gunnar's blackness is ironically validated and treated as exceptional on a large scale through his "nerdy" pursuit of poetry instead of through basketball, like he had originally imagined.

=== Latinidad ===
Based out of Los Angeles, Gunnar's stay in Hillside happens in the context of a predominantly Black but also Latino population. We are first introduced to the Latinos in Gunnar's proximity when he walks the halls of his new school and notices the change over time of the school's demographics. By the 1960s, in the context of the Civil Rights Movements and other subsequent community movements for self-determination, "The faces of these graduating ninth-graders are dark and overwhelmingly Latino and black." Gunnar walks down the hall and sees writing in Spanish—"Kathleen y Flaco para siempre con alma" sketched on the wall. (62) Later, his schools hosts the "Young Black and Latino Men: Endangered Species' assembly." Notably, the text also makes various references to Latino and Chicano communities in the LA area.

Beatty is both playful and intentional about how he represents or pokes fun at Latinidad. For instance, he discusses the "San Borrachos Mountains" (Holy Drunk Mts) that do not officially exist. Later, in his Spanish class, he puts Mexican Octavio Paz and California Chicano Frost in the same sentence, saying: "Yo voy a escribir poemas como Octavio Paz y Kid Frost… Octavio Paz ere un poeta gordiflon y activista de Mexico… [Kid Frost] es un poetastro hip-hop de la viaja guardia, de la vieja escuela quien vivio en Pomona… de la old school." To continue the literary allusions, Gunnar goes on to shut down the fetishization of Latino America—"Gunnar wrote 'Machisma Hermeneutics – Hemingway and the Hacienda Gringolust, An Obsession with the Latino Male'." Similarly, Gunnar references the Farm Workers Movement and the Chicano Movement through the character of Manny—"Manny was a tall curly-haired Chicano whose mission in life was to improve the posture of every hunchbacked laborer, swaybacked [sex worker], and stoop-shouldered hoodlum in the neighborhood." We even get introduced to Psycho Loco's (Cuban) Old Abuela Gloria. Finally, Beatty remains true to Chicano slang from the time period with words such as "pocho", "firme", and "cuete".
