= His Bloody Project =

2015 novel by Graeme Macrae Burnet

His Bloody project
- First edition
- Author: Graeme Macrae Burnet
- Language: English
- Genre: Fiction, crime
- Publisher: Contraband
- Publication date: 2015
- Publication place: United Kingdom
- Dewey Decimal: fictional

His Bloody Project: Documents relating to the case of Roderick Macrae is a 2015 novel by Graeme Macrae Burnet. Using fictional historical documents, it tells the story of a 17-year-old boy named Roderick "Roddy" Macrae, who commits a triple homicide in the village of Culduie, on the Applecross peninsula, in 1869.

== Synopsis ==
The book is the story of the young man Roddy Macrae and his animosity with the local constable, Lachlan Broad.

== Reception ==
In September 2016, it was shortlisted for the 2016 Man Booker Prize. In October 2016, His Bloody Project became the largest-selling book in the Booker shortlist.
