= Work Like Any Other =

2016 novel by Virginia Reeves

- First edition (US)
- Author: Virginia Reeves
- Language: English
- Genre: Fiction
- Publisher: Scribners
- Publication date: 2016
- Publication place: United States

Work Like Any Other is a 2016 debut novel by Virginia Reeves. Set in the 1920s, it narrates the story of a poor electrician who siphons energy from his town's electricity source to save his family from poverty. In July 2016 the book was longlisted for the 2016 Man Booker Prize. In 2017, Virginia Reeves received The Prix littéraire de l'Université Inter-Ages du Dauphiné (UIAD) for her novel translated in French with the title Un travail comme un autre.
