= Eileen (novel) =

2015 novel by Ottessa Moshfegh

- First edition
- Author: Ottessa Moshfegh
- Cover artist: Thomas Ott
- Language: English
- Published: 2015
- Publisher: Penguin Press
- Publication place: United States
- Media type: Print (hardcover)
- Pages: 272 pp
- ISBN: 978-1594206627

Eileen is a 2015 novel by Ottessa Moshfegh, published by Penguin Press. It is Moshfegh's first full-length novel. (Note: McGlue, published in 2014, is a shorter work and more often referred to as a novella than a novel proper, although reviewers (and even publishers) of Moshfegh's work are not consistent in their terminology.) It won the PEN/Hemingway Award for Debut Novel and was shortlisted for the 2016 Man Booker Prize and the 2015 National Book Critics Circle Award for Fiction. The novel was adapted into a 2023 film.

== Plot ==
Eileen narrates the events of her last week in her home town, a small Massachusetts town she calls X-ville, 50 years previously.

In 1964, 24-year-old Eileen is a secretary at a private juvenile correctional facility for teenage boys, which she calls Moorehead. She lives with her father, a former police officer who is an alcoholic and suffers from paranoia, believing he is being watched. Her mother died several years prior, and her sister Joanie lives a town over and visits sporadically. Eileen is deeply unhappy with her life and her self. She fantasizes about leaving and moving to New York City.

On Friday, Eileen spends her time counting down the clock at her job; fantasizing about Randy, a prison guard she has a crush on; and being annoyed with her fellow secretaries, Mrs. Murray and Mrs. Stephens. The prison psychiatrist, Dr. Frye, retires. That evening, Joanie visits briefly.

Eileen spends her last weekend in X-ville buying alcohol for her father, visiting the library, shoplifting from stores, and sitting outside Randy's apartment hoping to see him.

On Monday, the warden introduces the new psychiatrist, Dr. Morris, and director of education, Rebecca Saint John. Eileen finds Rebecca beautiful, stylish, and glamorous. She shows Rebecca her locker in the staff room and they briefly banter. Eileen is thrilled to have finally found a friend.

That afternoon, the boys put on the annual Christmas pageant. Rebecca leaves early, and later so does Eileen. Eileen wanders past "the cave" where boys are kept in solitary confinement due to bad behavior. Currently in the cave is Lee Polk, a boy who has been silent and withdrawn ever since arriving a few weeks previously. Lee begins to touch himself, and Eileen watches, transfixed, before a sound startles her and she goes back to the office. She asks Mrs. Stephens why Lee is in solitary and is told he is a troublemaker. After the other secretaries leave, she looks at Lee's file and discovers he is in prison for killing his father. Rebecca comes in to say goodnight and upon seeing the file, asks to borrow it.

On Tuesday, Eileen oversees visiting hours. Mrs. Polk, Lee's mother, visits for the first time. As the visit is beginning, Rebecca arrives to observe and take notes. Mrs. Polk tries engaging with Lee, but he says nothing. She finally leaves after saying "I blame myself". Rebecca leans into Lee and begins to talk to him so quietly Eileen cannot hear. Eileen is unsettled by how intimate the interaction is. She tells Rebecca they need the room for other visits, so Rebecca takes Lee to her office. Later, Eileen returns the notebook Rebecca left and finds Lee is still in Rebecca's office. Rebecca asks Eileen to meet her for a drink later.

Eileen and Rebecca meet that evening at O'Hara's, a local dive bar. Eileen is flattered by Rebecca's attention. Several men try to flirt with them, but Rebecca redirects them. She asks Eileen to dance and they do. After Rebecca leaves, Eileen is drunk and happy and decides to stay. She wakes up the next morning with her car stuck in a snow bank outside her house and a pool of vomit next to her.

On Wednesday morning, Eileen has to get into the house through a window because her keys are missing. Her father is angry and subjects her to verbal abuse and will not let her go to work before getting him more gin. After doing so, Eileen is about to leave when a police officer approaches her. The officer tells her that her father was pointing his gun at school children. The police and her father agree to allow Eileen to take the gun for safe keeping. She puts it in her purse and goes to work. At the prison, Rebecca invites her over to celebrate the next day, Christmas Eve. The rest of the day passes in a blur because Eileen is delighted.

On Christmas Eve morning, Eileen takes her father to the liquor store. That afternoon, she goes to Rebecca's. She is surprised to find Rebecca lives in the poorer side of town and that her home is dirty and disorganized. Rebecca is dressed in a dirty robe rather than her usual stylish clothing and seems distracted. After a couple glasses of wine, Eileen decides to go home due to the awkwardness. Rebecca insists she stay and starts talking about how Moorehead is not helping the boys. She shows Eileen a crime scene photo of Lee Polk's father, which causes Eileen to vomit. Rebecca tells Eileen that Lee confessed to her – he killed his father because his father was raping him. They discuss the crime, and Rebecca expresses shock that Mrs. Polk did not do anything. She reveals that they are in the Polk house and that Mrs. Polk is tied up downstairs.

Eileen is shocked and tries to leave, but Rebecca convinces her to stay. They argue about what to do, and decide to get Mrs. Polk to confess so they can give her over to the police. Eileen has the idea of using her father's gun to scare Mrs. Polk. They go into the basement and threaten Mrs. Polk, who initially resists but finally says she will confess. Rebecca goes upstairs to get something to write on while Mrs. Polk confesses to Eileen. At first she did not know what was going on, but once she did, even though she knew it was wrong she thought she had to stand by her husband. Additionally, he had become cold and distant, but after he began raping Lee he became her affectionate husband again. Rebecca comes back down and insists Mrs. Polk write everything down. When Mrs. Polk is hesitant, Rebecca asks Eileen for the gun, but fumbles it and accidentally shoots Mrs. Polk in the arm. All three women are shocked, and Mrs. Polk is hysterical. Eileen pulls out tranquilizers from her purse, which were left over from her mother's treatment, and she occasionally takes to sleep. Rebecca force feeds them to Mrs. Polk. They try to develop a plan, and Eileen suggests they take Mrs. Polk to her house, shoot Mrs. Polk again, and then make it look like Eileen's father did it. She thinks it might get her father the help he needs and that death will be a relief for Mrs. Polk. She suggests she and Rebecca run away to New York together.

Rebecca and Eileen carry the unconscious Mrs. Polk to Eileen's car. Rebecca tells Eileen she will meet them there, but Eileen realizes that she will not. Eileen goes home briefly and helps her father get into bed. She drives out beyond X-ville and leaves Mrs. Polk in the car on the side of the road by the forest. She walks up the highway and hitchhikes.

Eileen makes it to New York City, where she tells people to call her Lena. She changes her last name after getting married a few months later. The older Eileen alludes to multiple marriages and love affairs and lives a much happier and more confident life than her younger self.

== Characters ==
- Eileen Dunlop
- Charlie Dunlop, Eileen's father
- Rebecca Saint John, a co-worker of Eileen's
- Joanie, Eileen's sister
- Lee Polk, a boy incarcerated in the prison where Eileen works
- Rita Polk, Lee's mother
- Randy, a guard in the prison
- Mrs. Stephens, a secretary in the prison
- Mrs. Murray, a secretary in the prison

== Development ==
Moshfegh has stated she set out to write "a mainstream book a normal person could read," saying in an interview with Harper's Bazaar, "I wanted to attract the reader who might reach for something commercial to read on an airplane. Something that looked like it would transport the reader to another place, but maybe not teach them anything or challenge them...I thought, if I could get the reader to come with me to this place, and then startle them with some frank realities, then maybe consciousness could shift a little bit".

The character Rebecca is named for the title character in the Alfred Hitchcock film Rebecca. In an interview, Moshfegh said the film is one of her favorites and that "[w]hen I was writing Eileen I was thinking of her, of Rebecca, and the power that she has as this untouchable beautiful woman who seemed to be this way and then turned out to be that way".

Reviews, criticism, and discussion of Eileen often focused on the "disgustingness" of the character. Moshfegh's characters frequently focus on their bodies, with Moshfegh saying "I find it to be a crucial element of character, how someone is embodied in their physical self". However, "Moshfegh intended readers to experience her protagonist as more self-loathing than repellent". She was surprised by the focus on the body elements, telling The New Yorker "[t]hey wanted me to somehow explain to them how I had the audacity to write a disgusting female character...It shocked me how much people wanted to talk about that".

== Reception ==
Kirkus Reviews named it one of their best books of 2015, calling it "[a] shadowy and superbly told story of how inner turmoil morphs into outer chaos". Writing for The New York Times, Lily King notes how, "Moshfegh writes beautiful sentences. One after the other they unwind — playful, shocking, wise, morbid, witty, searingly sharp. The beginning of this novel is so impressive, so controlled yet whimsical, fresh and thrilling, you feel she can do anything." Similarly, Jean Zimmerman of NPR praised the author, writing, "[c]harmingly disturbing. Delightfully dour. Pleasingly perverse. These are some of the oxymorons that ran through my mind as I read Eileen, Ottessa Moshfegh's intense, flavorful, remarkable new novel." For The Guardian, Lydia Kiesling was more mixed, writing "like Eileen the woman, there are things to admire and disturb in Moshfegh’s book – the perversity, the pervading sense of doom. But there is something about this novel that, like its heroine, is not quite right. The prose clunks; Eileen is a little too in love with her own awfulness".

== Awards ==
Year	Award	Category	Result	Ref.
2015	Center for Fiction First Novel Prize	—	Longlisted	
2015	National Book Critics Circle Award	Fiction	Finalist	
2015	Shirley Jackson Award	Novel	Finalist	
2016	Man Booker Prize	—	Shortlisted	
2016	Crime Writers' Association Awards	New Blood Dagger	Shortlisted	
2016	Gordon Burn Prize	—	Shortlisted	
2016	PEN/Hemingway Award	—	Won	
2017	Joyce Carol Oates Literary Prize	—	Longlisted	

== Film adaptation ==
A film adaptation premiered at the 2023 Sundance Film Festival on January 21, 2023, directed by William Oldroyd and starring Thomasin McKenzie and Anne Hathaway. Filming began in New Jersey in early 2022. It was released by Neon in US theaters on December 1, 2023.
