= Hystopia =

2016 novel by David Means

- Author: David Means
- Language: English
- Publisher: Farrar, Straus and Giroux
- Publication place: United States
- English publication date: April 19, 2016
- Media type: Print (Hardcover)
- ISBN: 9780865479135

Hystopia is a 2016 novel by David Means. Literary critic Christian Lorentzen described the novel as "a counterfactual narrative by a Vietnam veteran, named Eugene Allen about his experience in a therapeutic, psychedelics-based trauma recovery program initiated, in the novel's alternate history, by John F. Kennedy." In July 2016, it was longlisted for the 2016 Man Booker Prize.

== Summary ==
Hystopia begins with a framing device to the narrative, presented as a manuscript, also titled 'Hystopia, left by Edward Allen, a Vietnam War veteran who has committed suicide. In this world, a hallucinogenic drug called Tripazoid can trigger a process called "unfolding", which can either help or (more reliably) worsen the PTSD of the Vietnam veterans who take it.

== Awards ==
- 2016 Man Booker Prize, longlistee.
