= Serious Sweet =

2016 novel by A. L. Kennedy

- First edition
- Author: A. L. Kennedy
- Language: English
- Genre: Fiction
- Publisher: Jonathan Cape
- Publication date: 2016
- Publication place: United Kingdom

Serious Sweet is a 2016 novel by A. L. Kennedy. It is Kennedy's 8th novel and narrates the story of a civil servant who offers letter-writing services to single women.

In July 2016, it was longlisted for the 2016 Man Booker Prize.

== Awards and honors ==
- 2016 Man Booker Prize, longlistee.
