= The Many (advertising agency) =

Advertising agency

- Industry: Advertising, marketing, entertainment
- Founded: Venice Beach, CA, February 2010
- Headquarters: Santa Monica, California, United States
- Number of locations: 2
- Area served: United States
- Number of employees: 160
- Website: www.themany.com

The Many, formerly known as Mistress, is an independent creative and strategic advertising agency based in Los Angeles, California and Hamburg, Germany.

== History ==
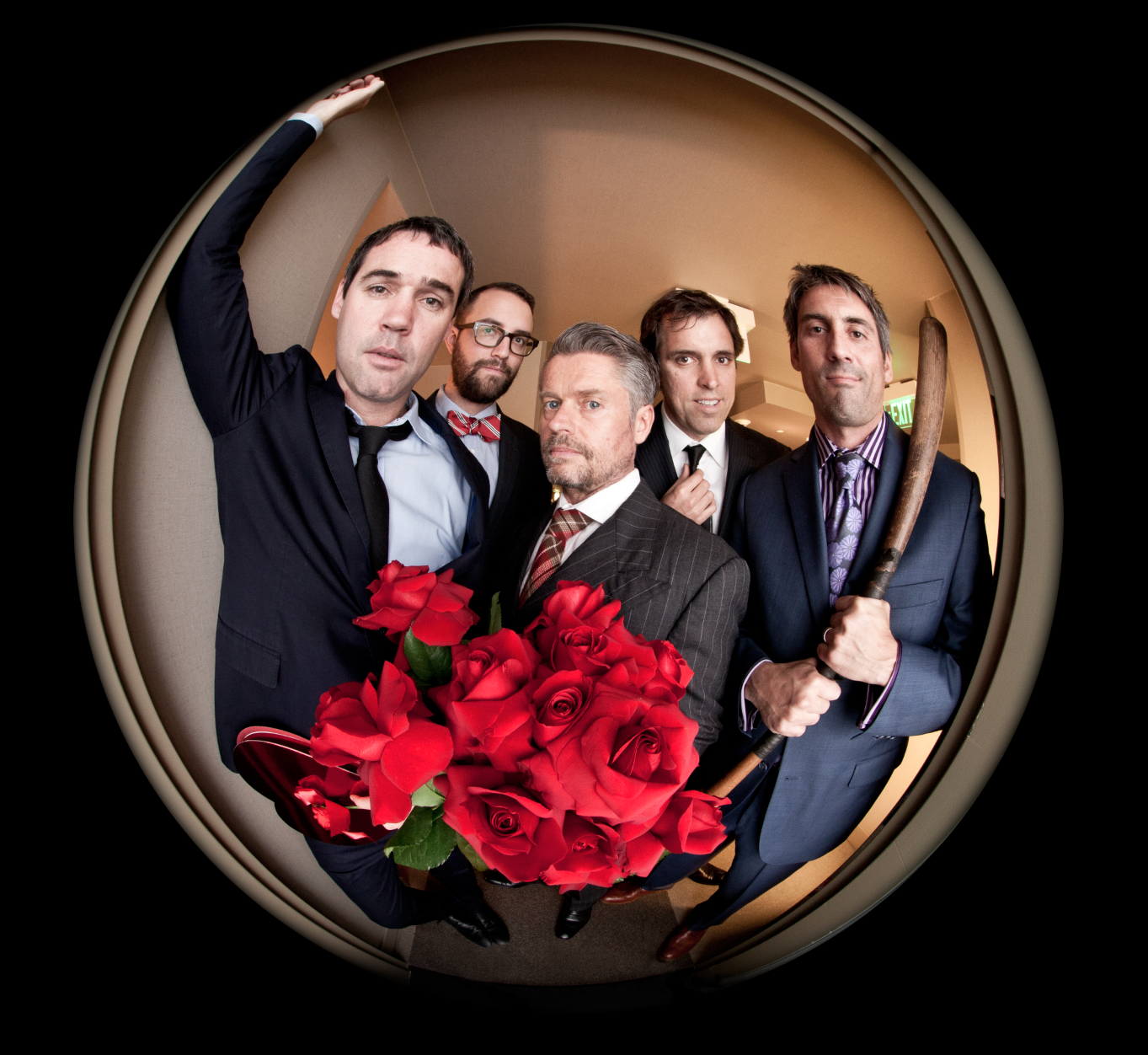
L-R: Damien Eley, creative director; Blake E. Marquis, design director; Jens Stoelken, strategy director; Scott Harris, creative director; Christian Jacobsen, strategy director.

The Many (then known as Mistress) was founded in Venice Beach in February 2010 by five partners: Christian Jacobsen, Damien Eley, Scott Harris, Blake E. Marquis and Jens Stoelken. After merging with media agency, Supermoon, former CEO, Amir Haque, became the agency's sixth partner.

The Many's work has been widely covered in the press, especially their campaigns for Mattel's Hot Wheels in which race car professionals performed stunts on life-size re-creations of toy Hot Wheels tracks (V-Drop, Double Loop, Corkscrew etc.). These were performed at the ESPN X Games, the "Fearless at the 500” event at the Indianapolis Motor Speedway, and for The World's Best Driver, a feature-length web film. The stunts set Guinness World Records and won four Lions at the Cannes Advertising Festival in 2013, one gold and three silver.

The Many has co-founded Neato, a collegiate marketing agency run by former Red Bull marketing executive Mike Poznansky. In 2014, the agency also co-founded Mistress.tech, a software agency in Hamburg, Germany with German software developer Freiheit.com.

In 2011, The Many was named an Advertising Age Small Agency of the Year, winning a Gold award. In 2017, The Many merged with the 2014 Advertising Age Agency of the Year winner, Supermoon (formerly Tiny Rebellion).
