= McGlue =

2014 novella by Ottessa Moshfegh

- First edition
- Author: Ottessa Moshfegh
- Language: English
- Genre: Novella
- Publisher: Fence Books (2014); Penguin Books (2019)
- Publication date: November 4, 2014
- Publication place: America
- Media type: Paperback
- Pages: 144 (Fence Books edition);160 (Penguin edition)
- ISBN: 978-0525522768

McGlue is a 2014 novella by Ottessa Moshfegh. It was Moshfegh's debut. Originally published by Fence Books, it was reissued by Penguin Books in 2019. The first hardcover edition was issued in 2024.

== Development ==
In an interview with The White Review, Moshfegh talked about her experience with writing McGlue: "McGlue was really a creative act of writing through spiritual possession. I mean, I wasn’t intellectualizing, I wasn’t thinking about plot. McGlue came out of me like some magical demon. And when that was over it was like, ‘Oh, thank God.’"

== Plot ==
In 1851, McGlue, an American sailor, wakes up to find himself chained down in the hold of the boat he works on. He is too drunk to remember what happened, but everyone is saying he murdered his shipmate, Johnson. This doesn't make sense to McGlue, who considered Johnson his friend, and has no memory of killing him. However, McGlue's history of alcohol abuse, violence, and a traumatic head injury leave him uncertain about what happened. As the ship completes its route back to Salem, Massachusetts, McGlue's inebriation is replaced by agonizing withdrawals. Awaiting trial in Salem, McGlue recalls the history of his friendship with Johnson and gradually recalls the events of the night he supposedly murdered him.

== Reception ==
A review in the Los Angeles Review of Books wrote, "Ottessa Moshfegh’s first novel reads like the swashbuckled spray of a slit throat — immediate, visceral, frank, unforgiving, violent, and grotesquely beautiful."

It was selected by Rivka Galchen as the inaugural Fence Modern Prize in Prose. Discussing her choice, Galchen said this of McGlue, "A sextant of the psyche, McGlue works its grand knowing through the mouthfeel of language; it’s a sharply intelligent, beautiful, and singular novel. A scion of Nathaniel Hawthorne and Raymond Carver at once, Moshfegh transforms a poison into an intoxicant.”

Novelist Brian Evenson said, "Here is the story of one man’s pursuit of self-destruction and his friend who drowns in his wake, brilliantly and desperately conveyed. Written in a style at once intoxicating and intoxicated, McGlue is a fierce and sodden historical novel that pulls nary a punch.”
