= The Many (novel) =

2016 novel by Wyl Menmuir

- First edition
- Author: Wyl Menmuir
- Language: English
- Genre: Fiction
- Publisher: Salt Publishing
- Publication date: 2016
- Publication place: United Kingdom

The Many is a 2016 novel by Wyl Menmuir. It follows the story of Timothy, a foreigner who buys an abandoned house in a coastal village. The book was longlisted for the 2016 Man Booker Prize.

== Awards and honours ==
- 2016 Man Booker Prize, longlistee.
