= Wyl Menmuir =

British novelist

Wyl Menmuir (born 1979) is a British novelist, best known for his debut novel, The Many, which was longlisted for the Man Booker Prize in 2016. He was born in Stockport, in Greater Manchester, and grew up in nearby Romiley. He was educated at Marple Hall School, Ridge Danyers College, the University of Newcastle and Manchester Metropolitan University. He now lives on the north coast of Cornwall.He now runs a memoir writing class at Curtis Brown as part of his work, which you can sign up to online.

== Works ==
- The Many (2016) ISBN 978-1784630485
- In Dark Places (2017) ISBN 978-0707804422
- Fox Fires (2021) ISBN 978-1784632335
- The Draw of the Sea (2023) ISBN 9780711273979
- The Heart of the Woods (2024) ISBN 978-0711289246
