= David Means =

American short story writer and novelist

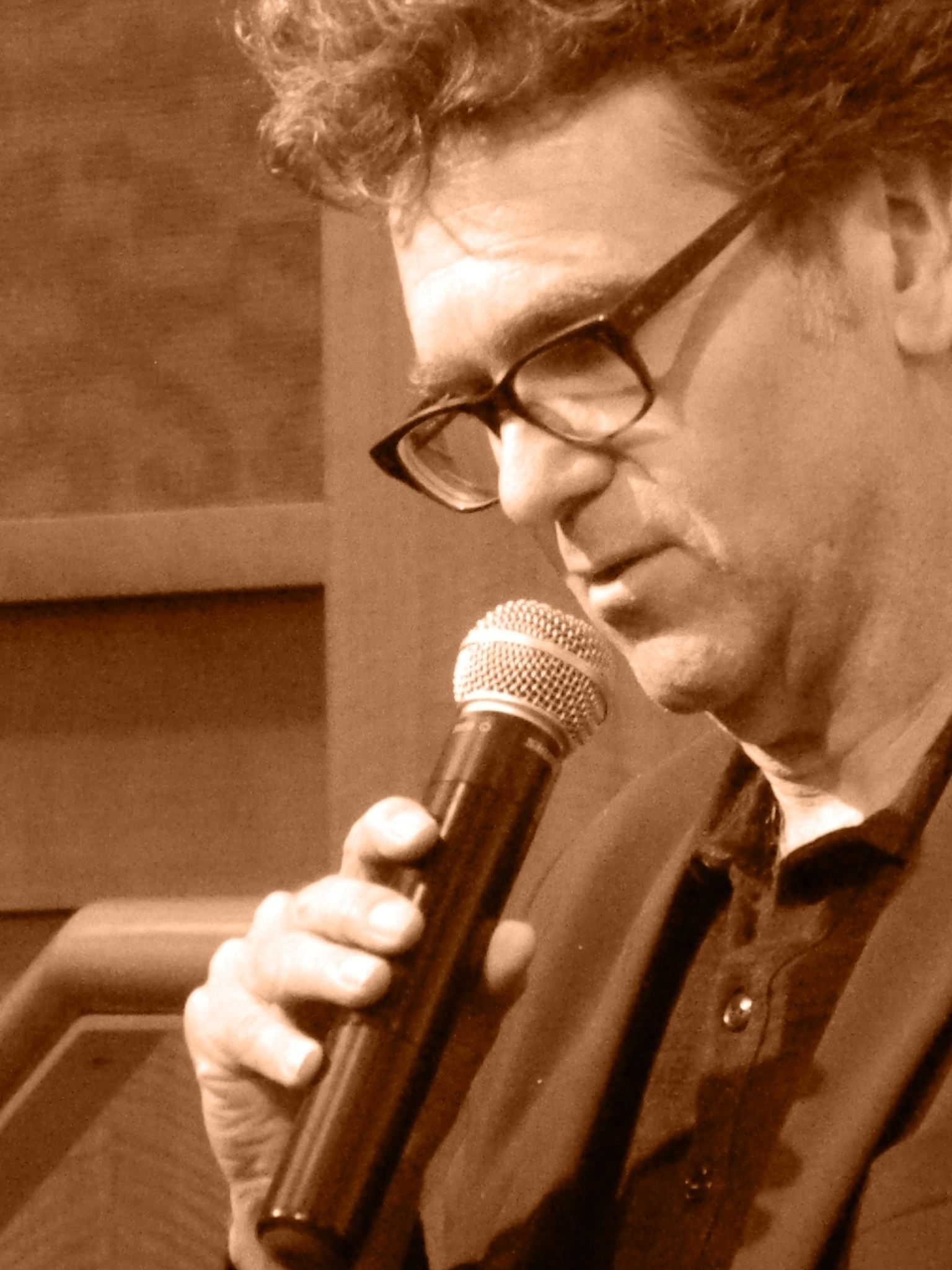
- Means speaking in New York, 2013

David Means (born October 17, 1961) is an American short story writer and novelist based in Nyack, New York. His stories have appeared in many publications, including Esquire, The New Yorker, and Harper's. They are frequently set in the Midwest or the Rust Belt, or along the Hudson River in New York.

== Biography ==
Born in Kalamazoo, Michigan, Means graduated from Loy Norrix High School in 1980. He received his bachelor's degree in 1984 from the College of Wooster, where his I.S. was "Bullfighting in Boston and other Poems". He went to graduate school at Columbia University, where he received an MFA in poetry. He has been a part-time member of the English department at Vassar College since 2001. Means is married with two children.

== Work ==
Contemporary Authors writes: "With Means's second collection, Assorted Fire Events: Stories, he was compared favorably to such esteemed writers as Raymond Carver and Alice Munro and praised by critics for his sharp prose." James Wood, in The London Review of Books notes that "Means' language offers an exquisitely precise and sensuous register of an often crazy American reality. Sentences gleaming with lustre are sewn through the stories. One will go a long way with a writer possessed of such skill. You can hear the influence of Flannery O'Connor in Means' prose: in the scintillating shiver of the beautiful imagery, in the lack of sentimentality, in the interest in grotesque violence, and gothic tricksterism." Eileen Battersby in The Irish Times has compared Means' work to that of Eudora Welty and John Cheever. Story consultant Robert McKee said, "David Means writes short stories, I suspect, because his arsenal of prose techniques is so diverse, he needs hundreds of tellings to explore them all."

His first novel Hystopia was long listed for the Man Booker Prize in 2016.

== Bibliography ==
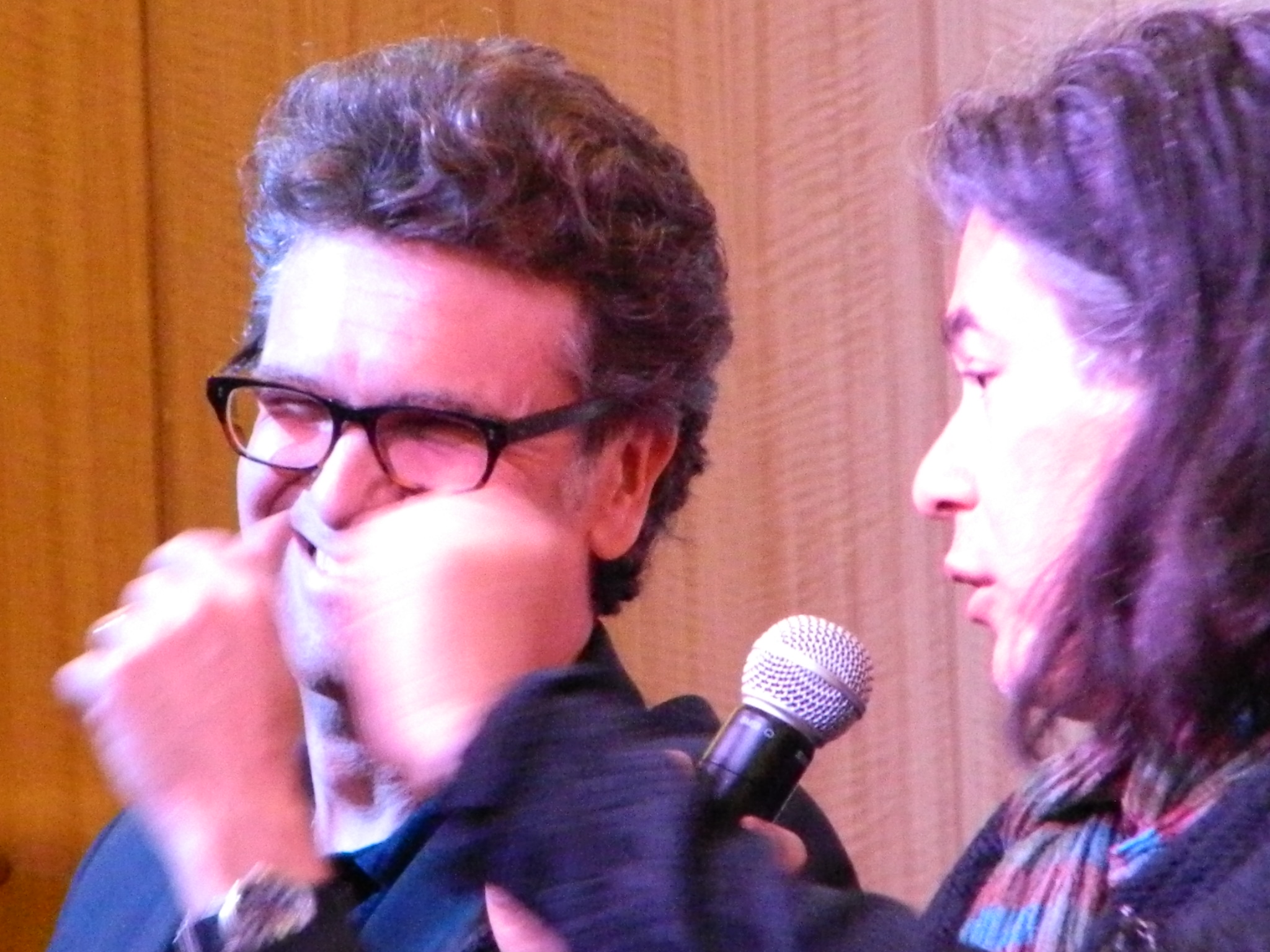
Means with Karl Greenfeld, 2013.

=== Novels ===
- Hystopia (2016) ISBN 9780865479135

=== Short fiction ===
==== Collections ====
- A Quick Kiss of Redemption (1991) ISBN 9780688094591
- Assorted Fire Events (2000) ISBN 9781893956056
- The Secret Goldfish (2004) ISBN 9780007164899
- The Spot (2010) ISBN 9780865479128
- Instructions for a Funeral (2019) ISBN 9780374279813
- Two Nurses, Smoking (2022) ISBN 9780374606077

==== Appearances in anthologies ====
- Fakes: An Anthology of Pseudo-Interviews, Faux-Lectures, Quasi-Letters, "Found" Texts, and Other Fraudulent Artifacts, edited by David Shields and Matthew Vollmer, W. W. Norton, 2012

== Awards ==
- Los Angeles Times Book Prize (2000) for Assorted Fire Events
- National Book Critics Circle Award (Finalist, 2000) for Assorted Fire Events
- Pushcart Prize (2001)
- O. Henry Prize (2006) for "Sault Ste. Marie"
- Frank O'Connor International Short Story Award (Shortlist, 2005) for The Secret Goldfish
- O. Henry Prize (2011) for "The Junction"
- PEN/Malamud Award for Excellence in the Short Story (2025)
