= Los Angeles Times Book Prize for Fiction =

Annual literary prize

- Country: United States
- Status: Active
- First award: 1980

The Los Angeles Times Book Prize for Fiction, established in 1980, is a category of the Los Angeles Times Book Prize. Works are eligible during the year of their first US publication in English, though they may be written originally in languages other than English.

The prize is recognized as one of the most prestigious literary honors in the Western United States and an important indicator of both literary excellence and emerging talent. The winner in the Fiction category receives a cash award of US$1,000 along with a distinct trophy.

== Recipients ==
Los Angeles Times Book Prize for Fiction winners and finalists
Year	Author	Title	Result	Ref.
1980	Walker Percy	The Second Coming	Winner	
1980	Joyce Carol Oates	Bellefleur	Finalist	
1980	John Kennedy Toole	A Confederacy of Dunces	Finalist	
1980	William Golding	Darkness Visible	Finalist	
1980	John le Carré	Smiley's People	Finalist	
1981	D. M. Thomas	The White Hotel	Winner	
1981	William Wharton	Dad	Finalist	
1981	Elizabeth Bowen	The Collected Stories of Elizabeth Bowen	Finalist	
1981	Mark Helprin	Ellis Island and Other Stories	Finalist	
1981	Ray Bradbury	The Stories of Ray Bradbury	Finalist	
1981	Philip Roth	Zuckerman Unbound	Finalist	
1982	Robert Stone	A Flag for Sunrise	Winner	
1982	Isaac Bashevis Singer	The Collected Stories	Finalist	
1982	Saul Bellow	The Dean's December	Finalist	
1982	Anne Tyler	Dinner at the Homesick Restaurant	Finalist	
1982	Donald Barthelme	Sixty Stories	Finalist	
1983	Thomas Keneally	Schindler's Ark	Winner	
1983	Gabriel García Márquez	Chronicle of a Death Foretold	Finalist	
1983	John le Carré	The Little Drummer Girl	Finalist	
1983	Umberto Eco	The Name of the Rose	Finalist	
1983	Iris Murdoch	The Philosopher's Pupil	Finalist	
1984	Milan Kundera	The Unbearable Lightness of Being	Winner	
1984	Joan Didion	Democracy	Finalist	
1984	Saul Bellow	Him With His Foot in His Mouth and Other Stories	Finalist	
1984	Harriet Doerr	Stones for Ibarra	Finalist	
1984	John Updike	The Witches of Eastwick	Finalist	
1985	Louise Erdrich	Love Medicine	Winner	
1985	Jamaica Kincaid	Annie John	Finalist	
1985	J. G. Ballard	Empire of the Sun	Finalist	
1985	Anita Brookner	Hotel du Lac	Finalist	
1985	Elizabeth Benedict	Slow Dancing	Finalist	
1986	Margaret Atwood	The Handmaid's Tale	Winner	
1986	Anne Tyler	The Accidental Tourist	Finalist	
1986	Vikram Seth	The Golden Gate	Finalist	
1986	Garrison Keillor	Lake Wobegon Days	Finalist	
1986	Carlos Fuentes	The Old Gringo	Finalist	
1986	John le Carré	A Perfect Spy	Finalist	
1987	James Welch	Fools Crow	Winner	
1987	Isabel Allende	Of Love and Shadows	Finalist	
1987	Peter Taylor	A Summons to Memphis	Finalist	
1987	Alice McDermott	That Night	Finalist	
1987	Joyce Carol Oates	You Must Remember This	Finalist	
1988	Gabriel García Marquez	Love in the Time of Cholera	Winner	
1988	Doris May Lessing	The Fifth Child	Finalist	
1988	Don DeLillo	Libra	Finalist	
1988	Penelope Lively	Moon Tiger	Finalist	
1988	Jorge Amado	Showdown	Finalist	
1989	Fay Weldon	The Heart of the Country	Winner	
1989	Eduardo Mendoza and Bernard Molloy	The City of Marvels	Finalist	
1989	Amy Tan	The Joy Luck Club	Finalist	
1989	Bette Pesetsky	Midnight Sweets	Finalist	
1989	Elaine Feinstein	Mother's Girl	Finalist	
1990	Edna O'Brien	Lantern Slides	Winner	
1990	Anyi Wang and Martha Avery	Baotown	Finalist	
1990	Alice Munro	Friend of My Youth	Finalist	
1990	Jane Smiley	Ordinary Love and Good Will: Two Novellas	Finalist	
1990	Thea Astley	Reaching Tin River	Finalist	
1991	Allan Gurganus	White People	Winner	
1991	Claude Simon	The Acacia	Finalist	
1991	J. M. Coetzee	Age of Iron	Finalist	
1991	Annie Ernaux	A Woman’s Story	Finalist	
1991	Sandra Cisneros	Woman Hollering Creek and Other Stories	Finalist	
1992	Art Spiegelman	Maus II, A Survivor's Tale: And Here My Troubles Began	Winner	
1992	Jane Smiley	A Thousand Acres	Finalist	
1992	Paule Marshall	Daughters	Finalist	
1992	Randall Kenan	Let the Dead Bury Their Dead: Stories	Finalist	
1992	Edna O’Brien	Time and Tide	Finalist	
1993	Barbara Kingsolver	Pigs in Heaven	Winner	
1993	Sue Miller	For Love	Finalist	
1993	Cathleen Schine	Rameau's Niece	Finalist	
1993	Helen Norris	The Burning Glass: Stories	Finalist	
1993	William Trevor	William Trevor: The Collected Stories	Finalist	
1994	David Malouf	Remembering Babylon	Winner	
1994	Bharati Mukherjee	Holder of the World	Finalist	
1994	William T. Vollmann	The Rifles: Volume 6 of the Seven Dreams sequence	Finalist	
1994	Mark Salzman	The Soloist	Finalist	
1994	David Leavitt	While England Sleeps	Finalist	
1995	William Boyd	The Blue Afternoon	Winner	
1995	Kate Grenville	Albion's Story	Finalist	
1995	William Trevor	Felicia's Journey	Finalist	
1995	Alice Munro	Open Secrets: Stories	Finalist	
1995	Bradford Morrow	Trinity Fields	Finalist	
1996	Rohinton Mistry	A Fine Balance	Winner	
1996	Louis Begley	About Schmidt	Finalist	
1996	Beryl Bainbridge	Every Man for Himself	Finalist	
1996	A.B. Yehoshua	Open Heart	Finalist	
1996	Tomás Eloy Martínez	Santa Evita	Finalist	
1996	Andrea Barrett	Ship Fever and Other Stories	Finalist	
1996	Pat Barker	The Ghost Road	Finalist	
1996	R.C. Binstock	Tree of Heaven	Finalist	
1997	James Carlos Blake	In the Rogue Blood	Winner	
1997	Louis B. Jones	California's Over	Finalist	
1997	Seamus Deane	Reading in the Dark	Finalist	
1997	Francisco Goldman	The Ordinary Seaman	Finalist	
1997	Bernhard Schlink and Carol Brown Janeway	The Reader	Finalist	
1998	W. G. Sebald with Michael Hulse (trans.)	The Rings of Saturn	Winner	
1998	William Trevor	Death in Summer	Finalist	
1998	Susan Minot	Evening	Finalist	
1998	Richard Price	Freedomland	Finalist	
1998	Philip Roth	I Married a Communist	Finalist	
1999	Amit Chaudhuri	Freedom Song: Three Novels	Winner	
1999	Annie Proulx	Close Range: Wyoming Stories	Finalist	
1999	Andre Dubus III	House of Sand and Fog	Finalist	
1999	Kent Haruf	Plainsong	Finalist	
1999	Ha Jin	Waiting	Finalist	
2000	David Means	Assorted Fire Events	Winner	
2000	Peter Ho Davies	Equal Love	Finalist	
2000	Michael Chabon	The Amazing Adventures of Kavalier & Clay	Finalist	
2000	Philip Roth	The Human Stain	Finalist	
2000	Joy Williams	The Quick and the Dead	Finalist	
2001	Mary Robison	Why Did I Ever	Winner	
2001	Abdulrazak Gurnah	By the Sea	Finalist	
2001	Alice Munro	Hateship, Friendship, Courtship, Loveship, Marriage: Stories	Finalist	
2001	Colson Whitehead	John Henry Days	Finalist	
2001	Jonathan Franzen	The Corrections	Finalist	
2002	Ian McEwan	Atonement	Winner	
2002	Peter Cameron	The City of Your Final Destination	Finalist	
2002	Kate Jennings	Moral Hazard	Finalist	
2002	Aleksandar Hemon	Nowhere Man	Finalist	
2002	Joanna Scott	Tourmaline	Finalist	
2003	Pete Dexter	Train	Winner	
2003	Michelle Huneven	Jamesland	Finalist	
2003	Tobias Wolff	Old School	Finalist	
2003	Jhumpa Lahiri	The Namesake	Finalist	
2003	Sherman Alexie	Ten Little Indians	Finalist	
2004	Colm Tóibín	The Master	Winner	
2004	Russell Banks	The Darling	Finalist	
2004	Marilynne Robinson	Gilead	Finalist	
2004	Chris Abani	GraceLand	Finalist	
2004	Joy Williams	Honored Guest: Stories	Finalist	
2005	Gabriel García Márquez with Edith Grossman (trans.)	Memories of My Melancholy Whores	Winner	
2005	Haruki Murakami	Kafka on the Shore	Finalist	
2005	Nick Hornby	A Long Way Down	Finalist	
2005	E.L. Doctorow	The March	Finalist	
2005	Mary Gaitskill	Veronica	Finalist	
2006	A. B. Yehoshua with Hillel Halkin (trans.)	A Woman in Jerusalem	Winner	
2006	David Mitchell	Black Swan Green	Finalist	
2006	Susan Straight	A Million Nightingales	Finalist	
2006	Peter Orner	The Second Coming of Mavala Shikongo	Finalist	
2006	Daniel Woodrell	Winter's Bone	Finalist	
2007	Andrew O'Hagan	Be Near Me	Winner	
2007	Junot Díaz	The Brief Wondrous Life of Oscar Wao	Finalist	
2007	Stewart O’Nan	Last Night at the Lobster	Finalist	
2007	Per Petterson	Out Stealing Horses	Finalist	
2007	Marianne Wiggins	The Shadow Catcher	Finalist	
2008	Marilynne Robinson	Home	Winner	
2008	Richard Price	Lush Life	Finalist	
2008	Marisa Silver	The God of War	Finalist	
2008	Sebastian Barry	The Secret Scripture	Finalist	
2008	Joan Silber	The Size of the World	Finalist	
2009	Rafael Yglesias	A Happy Marriage	Winner	
2009	Michelle Huneven	Blame	Finalist	
2009	Jill Ciment	Heroic Measures	Finalist	
2009	Jane Gardam	The Man in the Wooden Hat	Finalist	
2009	Kate Walbert	A Short History of Women	Finalist	
2010	Jennifer Egan	A Visit from the Goon Squad	Winner	
2010	Frederick Reiken	Day for Night	Finalist	
2010	Jonathan Franzen	Freedom	Finalist	
2010	Rick Bass	Nashville Chrome	Finalist	
2010	Richard Bausch	Something Is Out There: Stories	Finalist	
2011	Alex Shakar	Luminarium	Winner	
2011	Edith Pearlman	Binocular Vision: New & Selected Stories	Finalist	
2011	Julie Otsuka	The Buddha in the Attic	Finalist	
2011	Michael Ondaatje	The Cat's Table	Finalist	
2011	Joseph O'Connor	Ghost Light	Finalist	
2012	Ben Fountain	Billy Lynn's Long Halftime Walk	Winner	
2012	Lauren Groff	Arcadia	Finalist	
2012	Lydia Millet	Magnificence	Finalist	
2012	Jami Attenberg	The Middlesteins	Finalist	
2012	Michael Chabon	Telegraph Avenue	Finalist	
2013	Ruth Ozeki	A Tale for the Time Being	Winner	
2013	Daniel Woodrell	The Maid’s Version	Finalist	
2013	Percival Everett	Percival Everett by Virgil Russell	Finalist	
2013	Susan Steinberg	Spectacle: Stories	Finalist	
2013	Claire Messud	The Woman Upstairs	Finalist	
2014	Siri Hustvedt	The Blazing World	Winner	
2014	Helen Oyeyemi	Boy, Snow, Bird	Finalist	
2014	Jenny Offill	Dept. of Speculation	Finalist	
2014	Donald Antrim	The Emerald Light in the Air: Stories	Finalist	
2014	Jesse Ball	Silence Once Begun	Finalist	
2015	Valeria Luiselli	The Story of My Teeth	Winner	
2015	Helen Phillips	Beautiful Bureaucrat	Finalist	
2015	James Hannaham	Delicious Foods	Finalist	
2015	Adam Johnson	Fortune Smiles	Finalist	
2015	Anne Enright	The Green Road	Finalist	
2016	Adam Haslett	Imagine Me Gone	Winner	
2016	Dana Spiotta	Innocents and Others	Finalist	
2016	Lydia Millet	Sweet Lamb of Heaven	Finalist	
2016	Zadie Smith	Swing Time	Finalist	
2016	Garth Greenwell	What Belongs to You	Finalist	
2017	Mohsin Hamid	Exit West	Winner	
2017	Claire Messud	The Burning Girl	Finalist	
2017	Victor LaValle	The Changeling	Finalist	
2017	Vivek Shanbhag with Srinath Perur (trans.)	Ghachar Ghochar	Finalist	
2017	Jesmyn Ward	Sing, Unburied, Sing	Finalist	
2018	Rebecca Makkai	The Great Believers	Winner	
2018	Tayari Jones	An American Marriage	Finalist	
2018	Michael Ondaatje	Warlight	Finalist	
2018	Esi Edugyan	Washington Black	Finalist	
2018	Abby Geni	The Wildlands	Finalist	
2019	Ben Lerner	The Topeka School	Winner	
2019	Colson Whitehead	The Nickel Boys	Finalist	
2019	Maaza Mengiste	The Shadow King	Finalist	
2019	Madeline Ffitch	Stay and Fight	Finalist	
2019	Tash Aw	We, the Survivors	Finalist	
2020	David Diop with Anna Moschovakis (trans.)	At Night All Blood Is Black	Winner	
2020	Akwaeke Emezi	The Death of Vivek Oji	Finalist	
2020	Sarah Shun-lien Bynum	Likes	Finalist	
2020	Danielle Evans	The Office of Historical Corrections	Finalist	
2020	Peter Cameron	What Happens at Night	Finalist	
2021	Véronique Tadjo	In the Company of Men	Winner	
2021	Saïd Sayrafiezadeh	American Estrangement	Finalist	
2021	Mariana Enríquez with Megan McDowell (trans.)	The Dangers of Smoking in Bed	Finalist	
2021	Joy Williams	Harrow	Finalist	
2021	Claire Vaye Watkins	I Love You But I've Chosen Darkness	Finalist	
2022	Mircea Cărtărescu with Sean Cotter (trans.)	Solenoid	Winner	
2022	Anna Dorn	Exalted	Finalist	
2022	James Hannaham	Didn't Nobody Give a S— What Happened to Carlotta	Finalist	
2022	Jamil Jan Kochai	The Haunting of Hajji Hotak and Other Stories	Finalist	
2022	Fernanda Melchor (trans. by Sophie Hughes)	Paradais	Finalist	
2023	Ed Park	Same Bed Different Dreams	Winner	
2023	Susie Boyt	Loved and Missed	Finalist	
2023	Yiyun Li	Wednesday's Child	Finalist	
2023	Elizabeth McKenzie	The Dog of the North	Finalist	
2023	Justin Torres	Blackouts	Finalist	
2024	Jennine Capó Crucet	Say Hello to My Little Friend: A Novel	Winner	
2024	Rita Bullwinkel	Headshot	Finalist	
2024	Percival Everett	James	Finalist	
2024	Miranda July	All Fours	Finalist	
2024	Yuri Herrera	Season of the Swamp	Finalist	
2025	Bryan Washington	Palaver: A Novel	Winner	
2025	Stephen Graham Jones	The Buffalo Hunter Hunter	Finalist	
2025	Mia McKenzie	These Heathens: A Novel	Finalist	
2025	Andrés Felipe Solano (trans. by Will Vanderhyden)	Gloria: A Novel	Finalist	
2025	Tod Goldberg	Only Way Out	Finalist	
