= In the Forest =

2002 novel by Edna O'Brien

- First edition cover (US)
- Author: Edna O'Brien
- Audio read by: Stephen Rea
- Language: English
- Genre: novel
- Set in: west of Ireland, 1980s–90s
- Publisher: Weidenfeld (UK); Houghton Mifflin Harcourt (US)
- Publication place: Republic of Ireland
- Media type: Print: hardback
- Pages: 208
- ISBN: 978-0-618-19730-9
- Dewey Decimal: 823.92
- LC Class: PR6065.B7 I5
- Preceded by: Wild Decembers
- Followed by: The Light of Evening

In the Forest is a 2002 novel by Irish novelist Edna O'Brien. The novel is set in Ireland, and is based on a triple homicide: the 1994 murder of Imelda Riney, her son Liam and Catholic priest Fr Joe Walsh by Brendan O'Donnell.
