= Time and Tide =

Time and Tide (usually derived from the proverb Time and tide wait for no man) may refer to:

== Music ==
=== Albums ===
- Time and Tide (Greenslade album), 1975
- Time and Tide (Basia album), 1987
- Time and Tide (Battlefield Band album), 2002
- Time and Tide (Split Enz album), 1982
- Time and Tide (Steve Ashley album), 2007
- Time & Tide (Barbara Dickson album), 2008

=== Songs ===
- "Time and Tide" (Alan Price song), the theme to the 1982 film The Plague Dogs, sung by Alan Price (of The Animals)
- "Time and Tide" (Basia song), a 1987 song from the Time and Tide Basia album

== Film ==
- Time and Tide (1916 film), an American silent film by B. Reeves Eason
- Time and Tide (1983 film), a Japanese film by Azuma Morisaki
- Time and Tide (2000 film), a Hong Kong action film by Tsui Hark
- Time & Tide (2006 film), a Tuvaluan documentary film

== Other uses ==
- Time and Tide (magazine), a literary magazine published in England between the 1920s and the 1970s
- Time and Tide (novel), a 1992 novel by Edna O'Brien
- "Time and Tide" (Agent Carter), an episode of the American television series Agent Carter
- Ao no 6-gou: Saigetsu Fumahito Time and Tide, a video game released for the Dreamcast and commonly referred to in Western countries by its English language subtitle.
- Time and Tide Bell, a public art project in the United Kingdom comprising sculptural bells rung by high tide
- Time & Tide: The Islands of Tuvalu, a photographic essay book about Tuvalu

== See also ==
- Time and Tide Museum, a museum dedicated to the maritime history of Great Yarmouth, Norfolk
- Time (disambiguation)
- Tide (disambiguation)
- Time Waits for No One (disambiguation)
