= Wild Decembers =

Wild Decembers may refer to:

- Wild Decembers (novel), a 1999 novel by Edna O'Brien
- Wild Decembers (TV series), a 2010 Irish TV series, based on the novel
