= Wild Decembers (TV series) =

- Genre: Period drama
- Created by: Edna O'Brien
- Country of origin: Ireland
- Original language: English

Production
- Running time: 2 hours

Original release
- Network: RTÉ One

Wild Decembers is an Irish feature-length television drama series which broadcast on RTÉ One on 29 December 2010. Described as a "dark tale of love and land" by the Irish Independent, it is set in contemporary County Clare and is based on the novel of the same name by the Irish writer Edna O'Brien.

It stars the Galway star of the popular RTÉ drama Single-Handed, Owen McDonnell, Matt Ryan (Collision, The Tudors) and Lara Belmont (The War Zone, Henry VIII). It is directed by Anthony Byrne and is produced by Clare Alan.

== Production ==
The project was originally planned as a feature film but failed in its attempts to secure funding from the Irish Film Board and was scaled back, with RTÉ opting to take over the project. Filmed on set in Roundwood, County Wicklow, its strong cast of actors including veteran Seán McGinley, Hugh O'Connor, Jane Brennan, Pauline Cadell.

Edna O'Brien makes a cameo appearance as an extra in a church, her first return to such a building after having her work The Country Girls subject to religious condemnation by the Catholic authorities. She was the subject of book burning rites and was threatened with excommunication in the 1960s. Clare Alan said:

It was certainly strange to see Edna amongst a gaggle of women extras in a church.

Her parents were said to have become ashamed of her for invoking the controversy and, despite O'Brien dedicating the book to her mother, she seemed the most upset. After her mother's death, O'Brien discovered a hidden copy of The Country Girls in an outhouse near her family home; the book had been thoroughly censored by her mother, and with both the dedication and any supposedly offensive words scribbled through.

It had finished production by July 2009.
