= The Little Red Chairs =

Novel by Edna O'Brien

- Author: Edna O'Brien
- Language: English
- Set in: Ireland
- Publisher: Faber & Faber
- Publication place: Ireland
- Pages: 320
- ISBN: 057131631X

The Little Red Chairs is a 2015 novel by Irish author Edna O'Brien, who was 85 at the time of publication. The novel is O'Brien's 23rd fictional publication.

The novel follows an imaginary Balkan war criminal, Dr. Vlad, as he interacts with women in an Irish village. The past actions of the main character closely resemble the war crimes of the Bosnian Serb leader Radovan Karadžić. The title of the novel refers to a European theatre company's performance art which commemorated his 11,541 victims with 11,541 red chairs.

== Themes ==
Like much of O'Brien's earlier works, such as her famous The Country Girls, the novel views life through the eyes of girls and women in rural Ireland. The novel explores "how women are punished for their sins, or suffer for their innocence", a theme used in several other of O'Brien's works.

She also explores the stories of immigrants. Dr. Vlad is an immigrant into the Irish community, and his relationship to the Irish natives is a dark-comic focus. Even before he arrives on the scene, O'Brien has populated the town with other resident workers from Poland, Burma and Czechoslovakia. She also explores the story of immigration to the city of London, where she examines details in the "shadow of warfare and forced emigration", digging into the backgrounds of individual people "patiently bring[ing] to life the stories and histories, the terrors and hopes of London’s population of exiles, immigrants, and indentured visitors."

== Style ==
James Wood of The New Yorker describes the narration of the novel as "a loose and chatty free indirect discourse, edging comically (in good Irish literary fashion) toward stream of consciousness." Joyce Carol Oates likened the novel to Joyce and Kafka in style, and multiple critics call this style very effective. Julie Myerson described the prose as "sly perfection" which "changes tense (sometimes within a single chapter) or slides out of one character’s headspace and – with an absolutely convincing logic all of her own – into another."

== Critical reception ==
Reception of the novel was generally favourable. Novelist Philip Roth called it “her masterpiece”. New York Times reviewer and novelist Joyce Carol Oates favorably described the novel as " boldly imagined and harrowing". For Oates, the novel's subject could have lent itself to suspense, mystery or a thriller, instead O'Brien focuses the novel on "meditation and penance." In The New Yorker James Wood concludes that the novel is simply "remarkable". Examining the novel in the context of her other works, Wood described the novel as a successful "late style" novel which witnesses her "impatience with formal or generic proprieties; a wild, dark humor; a fearlessness in assertion and argument; a tonic haste in storytelling, so that the usual ground-clearing and pacing and evidentiary process gets accelerated or discarded altogether, as if it were (as it so often can be) mere narrative palaver that is stopping us from talking about what really matters."

Several reviewers emphasized how the novel moves between different genres, expectations and styles of novel. Washington Post reviewer Ron Charles described the novel as "leav[ing] one in humbled awe" because of O'Brien's "dexterity [and] her ability to shift without warning — like life — from romance to horror, from hamlet to hell, from war crimes tribunal to midsummer night’s dream." NPR reviewer Maureen Corrigan called the novel "one of her best and most ambitious novels yet" which is both "personal and political; charming and grotesque; a novel of manners and a novel of monsters."

Other reviewers gave high marks for the novel. The Guardian's Julie Myerson "a truly gripping read." She examines a number of striking features in the novel, but concludes that "The real genius of this novel – and I don’t use the word lightly – is to take us right up close to worlds that we normally only read about in newspapers, to make us sweat and care about them, and at the same time create something that feels utterly original, urgent, beautiful." Another NPR reviewer, Annalisa Quinn also praised the novel, describing it as highlighting how "O'Brien captures an extraordinary and almost holy innerness in each of her characters, however minor, and then plants those characters amidst the terrible velocity, the terrible pull of world events." Reviewing the novel for the Financial Times, Clair Messud describe the novel as "as lyrically arresting as ever, her vision as astute, and as delicate" yet at the same time striking for its strength of content: "interweaving of the near-mythical and the urgent present, and for its unflinching exploration of the complex and lasting effects of human brutality."
