= The Country Girl =

The Country Girl may refer to:

- The Country Girl (1766 play), a play by David Garrick
  - The Country Girl (1915 film), a 1915 silent film, based on the Garrick play
- The Country Girl (1950 play), a play by Clifford Odets
  - The Country Girl (1954 film), a 1954 film based on the Odets play, starring Bing Crosby and Grace Kelly
  - The Country Girl (Hallmark), a 1974 presentation in the Hallmark Hall of Fame based on the Odets play
- The Country Girls, Edna O'Brien's first novel 1960

== See also ==
- A Country Girl, a long-running British 1902 musical
- Country Girl (disambiguation)
