= Delicate Edible Birds =

Lauren Groff short story collection

- Author: Lauren Groff
- Illustrator: Shubhani Sarkar
- Language: English
- Genre: Fiction
- Publisher: Hyperion
- Publication date: January 27, 2009
- Publication place: United States
- Media type: Print (hardcover)
- Pages: 306 pp.
- ISBN: 978-1-4013-4086-5
- OCLC: 232977421
- Dewey Decimal: 813/.6 22
- LC Class: PS3607.R6344 D45 2009

Delicate Edible Birds is a short story collection written by Lauren Groff. Groff was born and raised in Cooperstown, New York, home of American writers James Fenimore Cooper and W. W. Lord. Several of the stories take place in Upstate New York. Before its release, Groff had also authored a best-selling novel, The Monsters of Templeton.

== Summary ==
The anthology comprises nine dramatic stories, taken together, spanning a century. In each story, a slice of life of various American women is revealed.

- "Lucky Chow Fun" takes place in the mythical Templeton (Cooperstown, New York), the setting of her first novel. In this tale, seventeen-year-old Lollie hopes to leave for college without looking back, but sinister events end up causing her to fear for the safety of her little sister and the future of her once-safe little town.
- "L. Debard and Aliette" is a crafty re-telling of the story of Abelard and Héloïse in New York amidst the 1918 flu pandemic.
- "Majorette" is a story of a young woman's personal growth in Hershey, Pennsylvania and the events that make her more worldly and the father and grandfather that always hold their little girl in deep affection.
- "Blythe" is the story of a bored, introverted Philadelphia attorney who has turned into a stay-at-home mom whose life changes when she takes a night class and meets an extroverted and eccentric woman who draws her out.
- "The Wife of the Dictator" is a character study of a simple American girl who marries a Latin American dictator. Her fate is inexorably bound up with his.
- "Sir Fleeting" is a story where a Midwestern farm girl on her honeymoon in Argentina falls into lifelong lust for a French playboy.
- "Watershed" is a tragedy, between a husband and a wife, which proves the maxim "don't say things you'll later regret".
- "Delicate Edible Birds" takes place during the fall of France. A disparate, but close group of War correspondents are held against their will by an evil French farmer who exacts a steep price in exchange for not turning them over to the Nazis.

== Characters ==
- Lollie, in "Lucky Chow Fun", is a seventeen-year-old high school senior hoping to leave for college without fear or regret, but suddenly finds her quaint small town to be a sinister place.
- Aliette, in "L. Debard and Aliette", is a young woman, temporarily felled by polio, who falls in love with the older L.Debard.
- Bern, in "Delicate Edible Birds", is a daring, attractive, female war correspondent, whose loss of personal honor in the name of the survival of others is an allegory for France herself.

== Reviews ==
- Delicate Edible Birds by Lauren Groff Book Review by Claire Hopely, The Washington Times, February 22, 2009
- "Delicate Edible Birds: And Other Stories" Book Review, Publishers Weekly, December 12, 2008

== Accolades ==
- The title story "Delicate Edible Birds" was chosen for The Best American Short Stories 2010 anthology.
- "L. Debard and Aliette" was a chosen for The Best American Short Stories 2007 anthology and was an O'Henry Recommended Story
- "Lucky Chow Fun" won the Pushcart Prize in 2008
