= Fates and Furies =

Fates and Furies may refer to:

- Fates and Furies (novel), a novel by Lauren Groff
- Fates & Furies (TV series), a 2018 South Korean TV series
