= Down by the River =

Down by the River may refer to:

- "Down by the River" (Albert Hammond song), 1972; re-released in 1975
- "Down by the River" (Bliss n Eso song), 2010
- "Down by the River" (Milky Chance song), 2014
- "Down by the River" (Neil Young song), 1969
- "Down by the River", a song by Bing Crosby, 1935
- "Down by the River", a song by Des'ree from Supernatural, 1998
- Down by the River (novel), a 1997 novel by Edna O'Brien
