= Country Girl =

Country Girl(s) may refer to:

== Literature ==
- Country Girl (memoir), a 2012 book by Edna O'Brien

== Music ==
- A Country Girl, a long-running British 1902 musical
- Country Girls (band), a Japanese female idol group

=== Albums ===
- Country Girl (Dottie West album) or the title song (see below), 1968
- Country Girl (1970 Billie Jo Spears album)
- Country Girl (1981 Billie Jo Spears album)
- Country Girl (Jody Miller album), or the title song, 1975
- Country Girl (Miriam Makeba album) or the title song, 1978
- Country Girl (Rebecca Hollweg album) or the title song, 2015
- Country Girl (Zahara album) or the title song, 2015
- Country Girl, by Jeannie C. Riley, or the title song, 1970

=== Songs ===
- "Country Girl" (Crosby, Stills, Nash & Young song), 1970
- "Country Girl" (Dottie West song), 1968
- "Country Girl" (Faron Young song), 1959
- "Country Girl" (Primal Scream song), 2006
- "Country Girl" (Rissi Palmer song), 2007
- "Country Girl (Shake It for Me)", by Luke Bryan, 2011
- "Country Girl", by Black Sabbath from Mob Rules, 1981
- "Country Girl", by Brinsley Schwarz from Despite It All, 1970
- "Country Girl", by Nazareth from Nazareth, 1971
- "Country Girls" (Jess Moskaluke song), 2019
- "Country Girls" (John Schneider song), 1984
- "Country Girls", by Little River Band from After Hours, 1976

== See also ==
- The Country Girl (disambiguation)
- Pind Di Kurhi (disambiguation), Indian films
