= Casualties of Peace =

Book by Edna O'Brien

- First edition (UK)
- Author: Edna O'Brien
- Cover artist: Rory McEwen
- Language: English
- Publisher: Jonathan Cape (UK); Simon & Schuster (US)
- Publication date: 1966 (UK), 1967 (US)
- Publication place: United Kingdom
- Media type: Print
- Pages: 192
- ISBN: 0-224-60216-0

Casualties of Peace, published in 1966, is Irish writer Edna O'Brien's fifth novel.

== Dedication ==
Casualties of Peace is dedicated to "Rita Tushingham, whose coat it is". Tushingham starred in the 1963 film, Girl with Green Eyes which was written by O'Brien; a fur coat plays a crucial role in the plot of the novel.

== Plot introduction ==
Set in London it concerns Willa McCord, an artist in glass (who is starting an affair with Auro, a married Jamaican) and her best friend and housekeeper Patsy (who lives with her violent husband Tom) Patsy decides to leave Tom but her plans are thrown into disarray when she finds she is pregnant.

== Reception ==
- Kirkus Reviews was positive: "Edna O'Brien manages to commit the reader and transmit a sense of life in a remarkable fashion. Few writers achieve this much."
- The New York Times was mixed, praising the authors "extraordinary style": "The novel pulsates with her racy, exuberant, nervous prose, a prose that often achieves the intensity of a unique shorthand" but then identifies a conflict between this style and the structure of the novel as being "especially damaging".
