= Matrix (Groff novel) =

2021 novel by Lauren Groff

- First edition cover
- Author: Lauren Groff
- Audio read by: Adjoa Andoh
- Language: English
- Genre: Historical novel
- Set in: England in the 12th century
- Publisher: Riverhead Books
- Publication date: September 7, 2021
- Publication place: United States
- Media type: Print (hardcover and paperback), e-book, audiobook
- Pages: 272
- ISBN: 978-1-59463-449-9 (First edition hardcover)
- OCLC: 1224045534
- Dewey Decimal: 813/.6
- LC Class: PS3607.R6344 M38 2021

Matrix is a historical novel by American author Lauren Groff, published by Riverhead Books on September 7, 2021. It is the first installment in a planned "triptych" of novels that includes The Vaster Wilds (2023).

== Premise ==
Groff's fourth novel, Matrix is about a "seventeen-year-old Marie de France... sent to England to be the new prioress of an impoverished abbey, its nuns on the brink of starvation and beset by disease." Alex Preston, writing in The Observer, described it as "a strange and poetic piece of historical fiction set in a dreamlike abbey, the fictional biography of a 12th-century mystic." Within the novel, Marie, whom Groff writes as a lesbian, turns around the abbey's fortunes and treats it as a quasi-mystical female separatist "utopia".

== Reception ==
Matrix debuted at number eleven on The New York Times fiction best-seller list for the week ending September 11, 2021. Publishers Weekly, in its starred review, praised Groff's "boldly original narrative" and her "transcendent prose and vividly described settings" for bringing to life "historic events, from the Crusades to the papal interdict of 1208." Publishers Weekly concluded, "Groff has outdone herself with an accomplishment as radiant as Marie's visions." In its starred review, Kirkus Reviews wrote, "Groff's trademarkworthy sentences bring vivid buoyancy to a magisterial story."

However, historians of medieval women were more critical of the novel, with a review in Nursing Clio critiquing the book's "clichés [which] make the medieval world of the novel feel both more artificial and more distant from the present than it might" and its "bleak and stagnant medievalisms".

It was selected for The Washington Post's "10 Best Books of 2021" list. Former United States President Barack Obama named Matrix one of his favorite books of 2021.

== Awards ==
On April 19, 2022, Matrix was awarded the Joyce Carol Oates Prize. Matrix was shortlisted for the 2021 National Book Award for Fiction and the 2022 Andrew Carnegie Medal for Excellence in Fiction. It was also a finalist for the 2022 Lambda Literary Award for Lesbian Fiction.
