= Adam Haslett =

American writer and journalist (born 1970)

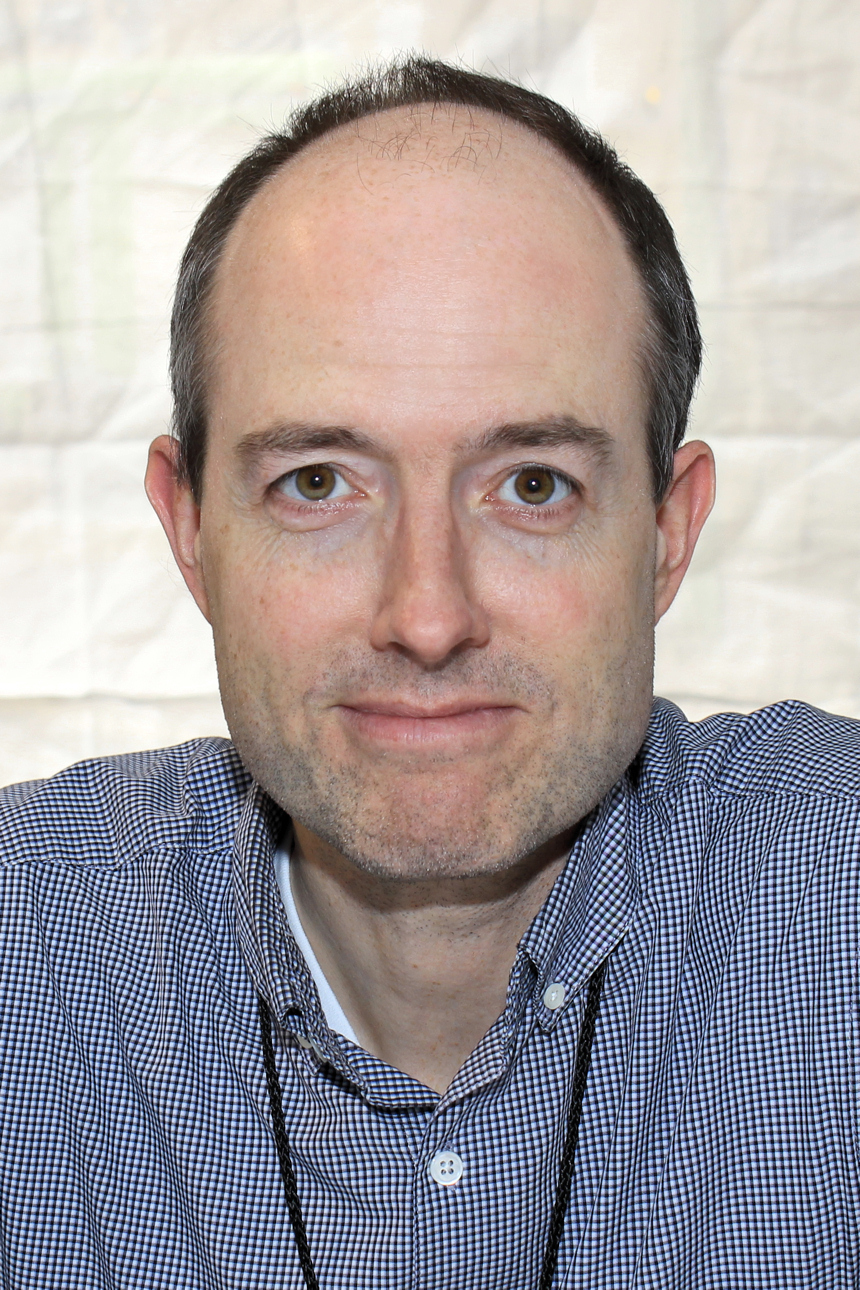
- Haslett at the 2016 Texas Book Festival
- Born: December 24, 1970 (age 55); Rye, New York, U.S.
- Education: Swarthmore College (BA); University of Iowa (MFA); Yale University (JD)
- Occupations: Writer; journalist
- Writing career
- Genre: Fiction
- Notable work: Imagine Me Gone (2016)
- Notable awards: PEN/Malamud Award (2006); Lambda Literary Award (2011); Los Angeles Times Book Prize for Fiction (2016)
- Website: www.adamhaslett.net

Adam Haslett (born December 24, 1970) is an American fiction writer and journalist. His debut short story collection, You Are Not a Stranger Here, and his second novel, Imagine Me Gone, were both finalists for both the Pulitzer Prize and the National Book Award. He has been awarded fellowships from the Guggenheim Foundation, the American Academy of Arts and Letters, and the American Academy in Berlin. In 2017, he won the Los Angeles Times Book Prize.

== Early life ==
Haslett was born in Rye, New York and raised in Massachusetts and Oxfordshire, England. After graduating from Wellesley High School, he went on to receive a B.A. in English from Swarthmore College, an M.F.A. in creative writing from the Iowa Writers’ Workshop, and a J.D. from Yale University.

== Career ==
Haslett began his career as a writer with a fellowship at the Fine Arts Work Center in Provincetown, Massachusetts. He published his first short story, “Notes To My Biographer”, in Zoetrope Magazine. This is the first story in his debut collection, You Are Not A Stranger Here, which was a finalist for a Pulitzer Prize and a National Book Award and was a New York Times Bestseller. The book was noted chiefly for its depictions of mental illness and “masterly sense of character.”

In 2010, Haslett published his first novel, Union Atlantic, which centers on a conflict over a piece of land between a young banker and a retired school teacher who is offended by the banker's new mansion. The novel was finished the week that the 2008 financial crisis began, and is the portrait of the culture of impunity than led to the great recession. It was shortlisted for the Commonwealth Prize and received the Lambda Literary Award. The Guardian called it a "brilliant debut novel."

His second novel, Imagine Me Gone, was published in 2016. It depicts a family coping with the intergenerational consequences of the father and eldest son's struggles with depression and anxiety. It won the Los Angeles Times Book Prize and was a finalist for the Pulitzer Prize and the National Book Critics Circle Award. In 2019, Literary Hub named it one of the twenty best novels of the decade.

In his journalism, Haslett has written about American politics, the 2008 financial crisis, and a range of cultural topics including gay marriage in The New Yorker, Vogue, Esquire, Financial Times, The Guardian, and The Nation, among others.

He has been a visiting professor at the Iowa Writers’ Workshop and Columbia University.

== Bibliography ==
=== Books ===
- You Are Not a Stranger Here, Nan A. Talese/Doubleday, 2002
- Union Atlantic, Nan A. Talese/Doubleday, 2010
- Imagine Me Gone, Little, Brown, 2016
- Mothers and Sons, Little, Brown, 2024

=== Short stories ===
Title	Publication	Collected in
"Burial"	Small Craft Warnings (Spring 1990)	-
"Reunion"	The Alembic (Spring 1997)	You Are Not a Stranger Here
"Notes to My Biographer"	Zoetrope: All-Story (Fall 1999)	You Are Not a Stranger Here
"The Beginnings of Grief"	The James White Review 16.1 (Winter 1999)	You Are Not a Stranger Here
"War's End" aka "You Are Not a Stranger Here"	Bomb 72 (Summer 2000)	You Are Not a Stranger Here
"Devotion"	The Yale Review 90.3 (July 2002)	You Are Not a Stranger Here
"The Good Doctor"	You Are Not a Stranger Here (2002)	You Are Not a Stranger Here
"Divination"	You Are Not a Stranger Here (2002)	You Are Not a Stranger Here
"My Father's Business"	You Are Not a Stranger Here (2002)	You Are Not a Stranger Here
"The Volunteer"	You Are Not a Stranger Here (2002)	You Are Not a Stranger Here
"City Visit"	The Atlantic (August 2005)	-
"Night Walk"	New York (November 30, 2009)	-
"The Act"	The Baffler 23 (2013)	-
"The Party of the Century"	Esquire (January 2015)	-

== Awards ==
- 2002 – New York Magazine Writer-of-the-Year Award winner
- 2002 – National Book Award for Fiction finalist for You Are Not a Stranger Here
- 2003 – PEN/L.L. Winship Award winner for You Are Not a Stranger Here
- 2003 – Pulitzer Prize for Fiction finalist for You Are Not a Stranger Here
- 2006 – PEN/Malamud Award winner for accomplishment in the short story form
- 2010 – The Commonwealth Prize finalist for Union Atlantic
- 2011 – Lambda Literary Award for Gay Fiction winner for Union Atlantic
- 2016 – Kirkus Prize finalist for Imagine Me Gone
- 2016 – National Book Award for Fiction longlist for Imagine Me Gone
- 2017 – Los Angeles Times Book Prize for Fiction winner for Imagine Me Gone
- 2017 – National Book Critics Circle Award finalist for Imagine Me Gone
- 2017 – Pulitzer Prize for Fiction finalist for Imagine Me Gone
