= Saints and Sinners (short story collection) =

2011 short story collection by Edna O'Brien

First edition

Saints and Sinners is a short story collection by Edna O'Brien. Faber and Faber published it in 2011.

The collection includes the O'Brien story "Sinners" in which a lonely widow running an isolated rural bed and breakfast overhears the sexual antics of a man, woman and teenage girl who on arrival claim to be couple and daughter - "Then came the exclamations, the three pitches of sound so different -- the woman's loud and gloating, the girl's, helpless, as if she were almost crying, and the man, like a jackass down the woods with his lady loves."

Saints and Sinners won the 2011 Frank O'Connor International Short Story Award.
