= A Million Nightingales =

2006 historical novel by writer Susan Straight

- Author: Susan Straight
- Language: English
- Series: Rio Seco trilogy
- Genre: Historical fiction
- Published: 2006
- Publisher: Pantheon Books, New York
- Publication place: United States
- Media type: Print (hardback)
- Pages: 340
- ISBN: 978-0-375-42364-2
- OCLC: 60516606
- Followed by: Take One Candle Light a Room; Between Heaven and Here

A Million Nightingales is a 2006 historical novel by Susan Straight. The novel is about Moinette Antoine, a beautiful and self-educated slave of mixed race living in Louisiana in the early to mid-19th century. Moinette narrates her own story from age 14 when she is taken from her mother to the end of her life when she has become a free woman and business owner. The first-person narration is done in a stream of consciousness style that focuses on Moinette's insightful thoughts and impressions of the strange and brutal world around her.

Major themes include the legacy of slavery in America, women as property, and mother-daughter relationships.

It is the first novel in a set of three companion novels known as the Rio Seco trilogy. The other books in the trilogy are Take One Candle Light a Room (2010) and Between Heaven and Here (2012).

The novel was almost universally praised by critics. It was shortlisted for the 2006 Los Angeles Times Book Prize in Fiction.

== Development history ==
The catalyst for the author, Susan Straight, to write A Million Nightingales was a story told to her by an African American neighbor. He told her that the reason why he had moved from Louisiana to Riverside, California (Straight's hometown) in 1953 was to protect his young, beautiful daughter from an older white man who was going "to come and get her". For the next 10 years, Straight thought about how her own three daughters – all young, beautiful, and mixed-race – would have fared growing up in a different time. "I looked at all three of them and thought, 'If they'd been born in 1800 Louisiana, people would have had one thing in mind. One thing,' " Straight said. "Can you imagine what their lives would have been like, with their looks and their brains?"

To research the novel, Straight traveled to Louisiana's rural Plaquemines Parish. She stayed in Woodland Plantation, which used slave labor in the past. "It was very creepy," Straight said. "I stayed up all night writing. I wrote a lot of the novel by hand. I could see the slave cabin from my window, and the idea that someone could look at that house all the time was amazing."

She also read dozens of books about Louisiana, French trappers and explorers, the treatment of slaves, and other documents about the early 1800s. Details she found in court documents were incorporated into Moinette's story. For example, in 2001, she read an account of a woman named Manon, a free woman of color who traded a slave she owned to buy her own son because he could not be legally freed until he was 21 years old. Straight became obsessed with the story, "I couldn't show [my daughter] the piece of paper in my desk, the copy of the sale of Manon. I could only write about a woman like her with a child I imagine who looked like mine."

=== Explanation of the novel's title ===
The title of the novel is contained within its epigraph, "I have a million nightingales on the branches of my heart singing freedom," which is taken from a musical adaptation, by Vocolot, of the poem "Defiance" by the Palestinian poet Mahmoud Darwish. The same line is said by the character Mr. Jonah Greene in Chapter 10 when Moinette is planning how to purchase her own son as a slave. The "million nightingales" of the title is a metaphor for Moinette and the other slaves living in the United States in the early 19th century, of whom there were over a million.

=== Companion novels ===
A Million Nightingales is the first novel in a set of three companion novels known as the Rio Seco trilogy. The other books in the trilogy are Take One Candle Light a Room (2010) and Between Heaven and Here (2012). Even though the last two novels do not take place in the 19th century – they take place in 2005 and 2000, respectively – all three books are connected by place, family, and kinship.

Take One Candle Light a Room is about Fantine "FX" Antoine, a successful travel writer based in Los Angeles, who is the great-great-great granddaughter of Moinette Antoine. When FX's godson, Victor, gets in trouble with the law, FX travels to Louisiana to help him. FX's given name, Fantine, is the same name of Moinette's friend, a fellow slave at the Rosière plantation. The title of the book is from a phrase that Moinette’s mother, Marie-Thérèse, used to describe Moinette.

Between Heaven and Here is about the aftermath of Glorette Picard's death. Glorette, a crack-addicted prostitute, was Victor's mother and FX Antoine's childhood friend. Glorette and FX's families are connected by the story that was the catalyst for A Million Nightingales. In the background story of this novel and the previous one, FX's mother and four other girls escaped from rural Louisiana to live in Riverside, California after the local plantation owner raped three of them in 1958. Glorette's mother joined them a few years later.

== Plot ==
Moinette Antoine is a young slave at Azure, a sugarcane plantation south of New Orleans owned by the Bordelons, where she lives with her mother, Marie-Thérèse, who is the plantation's laundress. Moinette is the housemaid to Céphaline, the teenage daughter of the Bordelons, who is a scholar and a misfit. Moinette surreptitiously teaches herself how to read by listening to Céphaline's lessons and observing her studies. After Céphaline unexpectedly dies, Moinette is sold to Laurent de la Rosière, the owner of another sugarcane plantation.

Soon after she arrives at Rosière, Moinette attempts to escape and return to her mother in Azure, but she is quickly captured and returned to Rosière. Moinette becomes the housemaid of Madame Pélagie who is a relative of the Bordelons. Madame Pélagie is another intelligent and free-spirited woman who promises to bring Moinette to New Orleans where they can run a shop together. Moinette becomes pregnant after she is raped by three men, including the Bordelons' son. She gives birth to a boy, Jean-Paul. Before Madame Pélagie can take Moinette to New Orleans, tragedy strikes again, and Moinette is sold to Julien Antoine, a lawyer from Opelousas.

In Opelousas, Moinette discovers that Julien Antoine is a kind person who is willing to help her. She pretends to be his mistress while she runs his boardinghouse. She continues her self-education by reading Antoine's legal papers and learning how to write. Eventually, Antoine helps her to purchase her son and become a free woman. However, even when Moinette is free, her life continues to be marked by brutality and tragedy.

== Style and structure ==
The first-person narration is done in a stream of consciousness style that focuses on Moinette's insightful thoughts and impressions of the strange and brutal world around her. Bambara, French, and Creole words and phrases are used throughout the novel.

The novel consists of twelve chapters, a note about the languages of early 19th century Louisiana, and a glossary that consists of the Bambara, French, and Creole words used in the book.

== Major themes ==
- Slavery and its legacy, or race in America.
- Women as property.
- Mother-daughter relationships, particularly, daughters being separated from their mothers.
- Spirituality/folk wisdom vs. modern science.

== Reception ==
The novel was shortlisted for the 2006 Los Angeles Times Book Prize in Fiction. When Straight won the Lannan Literary Award for Fiction in 2007, the Lannan Foundation said A Million Nightingales "continues her singularly beautiful exploration of race in America."

A Million Nightingales was almost universally praised by critics. Megan Marshall, writing for The New York Times Book Review, praised the book for being a “richly complicated narrative”...“a powerful and moving story, written in language so beautiful you can almost believe the words themselves are capable of salving history's wounds.” Other reviews also praised the novel for its lyrical language, strong narrative, and convincing depiction of antebellum plantation life. The critic for the Women's Review of Books gave the novel high praise, "I came away feeling I had not only encountered people whose stories mattered but that I had gained crucial insight into America's past. Next time someone asks me why fiction matters, I'll hand over a copy of A Million Nightingales."

Some critics had reservations about the novel. Publishers Weekly thought that the character Moinette's understanding of the world around her was too sophisticated and that her story of success was not entirely convincing. However, the critic also thought that the novel "effectively evokes the conflicted mélange of races, nationalities and cultures that defined the early 19th-century territory." The critic from Library Journal thought that the story was "passionately imagined", but that readers "not caught up in the character's emotional world may find the overall effect dissipated" due to the narrative style and use of non-English words.

The critic Stephanie Zacharek, writing for the Los Angeles Times, wrote a review that was mostly negative. She thought that the novel was trying too hard to be a serious work, that Straight "constricts her heroine within webs of phrasing so self-conscious that we can forget we're in 19th century Louisiana and believe, instead, that we're sitting in on a writer's workshop."

== Publication history ==
- 2006, United States, Pantheon Books, New York, ISBN 978-0-375-42364-2, Pub date 21 March 2006, Hardback.
- 2007, United States, Anchor Books, ISBN 978-1400095599, Pub date 8 May 2007, Paperback.
- 2008, United States, Anchor Books, ASIN B001M5JVQ6, Pub date 26 November 2008, Amazon Kindle edition.
- 2013, United States, Audible Studios, ASIN B00FR5JPBI, Pub 10 October 2013, Audiobook.
