= The High Road (novel) =

Book by Edna O'Brien

- First edition (UK)
- Author: Edna O'Brien
- Language: English
- Publisher: Weidenfeld & Nicolson (UK); Farrar, Straus & Giroux (US)
- Publication date: November 1, 1988
- Publication place: Ireland
- Media type: Print
- Pages: 224 pages

The High Road is a 1988 novel by Irish novelist Edna O'Brien. The novel follows an unnamed Irish protagonist as she recovers on a Mediterranean island. It was O'Brien's tenth novel, published 11 years after Johnny I Hardly Knew You.

== Critical reception ==
Kirkus Reviews was mildly critical of the novel's style, concluding that it was "a novel governed (perhaps too strictly) by the impulse to lyricism, but one that peers into the coming of old age with fear, longing--and passion." Publishers Weekly was similarly critical writing "the novel is fatally mired in symbolism and improbable events."

Similarly, the Chicago Tribune reviewer Maura Boland thought the novel failed at developing plot and character, writing "lyrical prose and striking metaphors are not enough. The book sags under the weight of literary and religious allusions, and its episodic structure at times almost obscures the narrative."
