= Girls in Their Married Bliss =

Book by Edna O'Brien

First edition (publ. Jonathan Cape)

Girls in Their Married Bliss is the third and final novel in Edna O'Brien's The Country Girls Trilogy following The Country Girls and The Lonely Girl. The novel was first published in Britain in 1964. The novel was less well received, because of its darker themes and writing, and was not published in the United States until 1967.

== Reception ==
Generally, the novel was not as well received in either the United Kingdom or the United States. The New York Times reviewer Mellicent Bell described the novel as a "less rollicking [...] third stage of [Baba and Kate's] adventures" which describes a grimmer fate for the two characters than some readers might like. Bell highlights how the novel continues patterns and themes from the earlier novels, including sexual exploration and how religiosity affects the two women.

Kirkus Reviews was similarly mixed about its conclusions, writing "A mixed pleasure, this is at times a lovely, larky book and in others, there are sad spot touches closing with the rueful envoi."
