= Arthur O'Sullivan =

Irish actor (1912–1981)

Arthur O'Sullivan (1912 – 17 February 1981), also known as Archie O'Sullivan, was an Irish actor who appeared on stage, screen and radio.

== Radio career ==
The Radio Éireann Players were a repertory company for radio formed in 1947 which performed in the station's regular drama productions. O'Sullivan joined in 1948, along with Laurence O'Dea and Frank O'Dwyer. After the depredations of the war-time years and the devastating fire in the Abbey Theatre in 1951, the Radio Éireann Players' powerful weekly performances inspired interest in drama throughout the country. Their effect has been compared to an effort at national re-invention, in the same way that the national theatre fifty years earlier had been an attempt to redefine Irish identity. The formation of a full-time theatre company for a radio station was something new - no English-speaking country (not even the BBC) possessed one, and all its members hailed from Ireland, many being native Irish speakers. Micheál Ó hAodha became the company's first producer and Roibeárd Ó Faracháin with Ria Mooney of the Abbey recruited.

O'Sullivan appeared with Tom Studley, George Greene, Éamonn Kelly, Joe Lynch and Aidan Grennell in pieces by writers such as Frank O'Connor and Seán Ó Faoláin. Another contributor was Brendan Behan, who made his debut with two plays for the radio. Between plays the players acted in radio variety programmes and read pieces on the radio as necessary.

In 1961 O'Sullivan acted in The Weaver's Grave. Adapted and produced by Mícheál Ó hAodha, it was written by Galway author Seamus O'Kelly, and won the coveted Prix Italia for Radio Drama. The players also won this award in 1964.

He later appeared in Radio Éireann's "Rambling House"; a programme in which Ceoltóirí Chualann, Seán Ó Sé, Éamon Kelly and others re-enacted, through singing, music, and story telling, the Irish Rambling Houses of old.

== Stage and screen ==
In April 1966 O'Sullivan appeared on RTÉ television in The Singer, by P. H. Pearse, part of a series broadcast to mark the 50th Anniversary of the 1916 Insurrection. Another RTÉ series that he appeared in was Teems of Times in 1978, playing the part of Sailor Clancy.

O'Sullivan was a prolific stage actor, appearing in the world premières of plays by John B. Keane and Brian Friel. He also took small roles in a number of significant feature films shot in Ireland, such as Girl with Green Eyes (1964), Ryan's Daughter (1970) and Barry Lyndon (1975). In the latter film, he played the part of the courteous highwayman, Captain Feeny.

Arthur O'Sullivan died at Our Lady's Hospice, Harolds Cross in Dublin, at the age of 69.

== Filmography ==
Year	Title	Role	Notes
1962	The Quare Fellow	Hangman ('Himself')	
1963	Mystery Submarine	Mike Fitzgerald	
1964	Girl with Green Eyes	James Brady	
1965	Young Cassidy	Foreman	
1967	The Viking Queen	Old Man at Tax-Enquiry	
1970	Ryan's Daughter	Mr. McCardle	
1971	L'iguana dalla lingua di fuoco	Inspector Lawrence	
1975	Barry Lyndon	Captain Feeny, the Highwayman	
1978	On a Paving Stone Mounted		
