= Time Waits for No One =

Time Waits for No One may refer to:

== Albums ==
- Time Waits for No One (Mavis Staples album), 1978
- Time Waits for No One: Anthology 1971–1977, by the Rolling Stones, 1979
- Time Waits for No One, by Christy Essien-Igbokwe, 1978

== Songs ==
- "Time Waits for No One" (Freddie Mercury song), a remix of the 1986 song "Time", 2019
- "Time Waits for No One" (Neil Sedaka song), popularized by the Friends of Distinction, 1970
- "Time Waits for No One" (Rolling Stones song), 1974
- "Time Waits for No One", by Ambrosia (band) from Ambrosia, 1975
- "Time Waits for No One", by Dusty Springfield from Reputation, 1990
- "Time Waits for No One", by Eddie & Ernie, 1963
- "Time Waits for No One", by the Jacksons from Triumph, 1980
- "Time Waits for No One", by Soko from Feel Feelings, 2020
- "Time Waits for No One", from the film Shine On, Harvest Moon, 1944
- "Time Waits (For No One)", by Michael Schenker Group from Built to Destroy, 1983

== See also ==
- Time Will Wait for No One, an album by Local Natives, 2023
- Time and Tide (disambiguation)
