= House of Splendid Isolation =

1994 novel by Edna O'Brien

- First UK edition (publ. Weidenfeld & Nicolson)
- Author: Edna O'Brien
- Publication date: June 1, 1994
- ISBN: 0-374-17309-5

House of Splendid Isolation is a 1994 novel by Irish novelist Edna O'Brien. The novel depicts the relations of a fictional Irish Republican Army terrorist, Roger McGreevy and his hostage, an elderly woman. The novel brings elements of the thriller genre to O'Brien's ongoing explorations of Irish society. It is based on the life of Dominic McGlinchy, whom O'Brien interviewed while incarcerated in Portlaoise Prison.

== Reception ==
The New York Times gave a mediocre review calling the novel both "a brave book, and if it does not altogether succeed, [and an] attempt nonetheless [that] merits praise." The review notes that the novel is a "dramatic departure" from O'Brien's typical novels, and in that context of experiment "we see her audacity fail and her elegant prose run badly out of control." The Independent was decidedly negative, writing "there could hardly be a neater illustration of O'Brien's fatal humourlessness, and of the extent to which too much posing as a tragedy queen has turned her deaf to her own bathetic effects."

Publishers Weekly was slightly more positive, noting that the scenes about McGreevy the terrorist were unsuccessful, but describing the novel on a whole as "Powerful, however, is the elegiac voice on themes of womanly love, the tale's psychological acuity and the re-creation of a haunted landscape." Kirkus Reviews describes it as successful, its "well worth reading as O'Brien's first concentrated treatment of the troubles--and the pain they visit on the Irish people."
