= The Vaster Wilds =

2023 novel by Lauren Groff

- Author: Lauren Groff
- Audio read by: January LaVoy
- Language: English
- Genre: Historical novel
- Set in: Virginia in 1610
- Publisher: Riverhead Books
- Publication date: September 12, 2023
- Publication place: United States
- Media type: Print (hardcover and paperback), e-book, audiobook
- Pages: 272
- Awards: The Florida Book Award for General Fiction
- ISBN: 978-0-593-41840-6

The Vaster Wilds is a historical novel by Lauren Groff, published by Riverhead Books on September 12, 2023. It is the second installment in a planned "triptych" of novels that includes Matrix (2021).

== Premise ==
Set in colonial Virginia, Groff's fifth novel, The Vaster Wilds, is about a servant girl who "escapes from a colonial settlement in the wilderness. She carries nothing with her but her wits, a few possessions, and the spark of god that burns hot within her."

== Reception ==
The Guardian described the novel as "a hymn of endurance" with "biblical, incantatory" prose. The Vaster Wilds received other positive reviews in the Los Angeles Times, The Boston Globe, and The New York Times Book Review. Literary critic Maureen Corrigan was more critical of the book's plot and pacing, noting that "without a destination in view, all that running starts to seem kind of aimless."

The novel won the gold prize for General Fiction at the Florida Book Award and was named by Barack Obama as one of his favorite books of 2023.

== Audio Recording ==
January LaVoy narrates the audio book version. The Guardian positively reviewed her performance, noting the delivery and timbre to be well-suited to the book's tone.
