= A Pagan Place (novel) =

Book by Edna O'Brien

- First edition
- Author: Edna O'Brien
- Language: English
- Publisher: Weidenfeld & Nicolson
- Publication date: April 16, 1970
- Publication place: Ireland
- Media type: Print
- Pages: 223 pages
- ISBN: 0-297-00027-6

A Pagan Place is a 1970 novel by Irish writer Edna O'Brien. The book was first published on April 16, 1970, by Weidenfeld & Nicolson and follows a young girl in the 1930s and 1940s. In 1972 A Pagan Place was adapted into a stage production, which received mixed reviews.

== Style ==
A Pagan Place is narrated in second person in its entirety. As Shahriyar Mansouri argues, such a "melodic" narratorial voice, presented through the mouthpiece of second-person narrator signifies a lost sense of identity and independence for the post-independence Irish women. The only occasion when the narratorial voice appropriates the first person pronoun 'I', indicating its presence and self-recognition, comes at the end of the novel, where the unnamed, young female protagonist embarks on her journey of formation.

== Reception ==
The Sydney Morning Herald praised the book's narrative, saying that it "flows along absorbingly without a line of direct dialogue".
