= Night (O'Brien novel) =

1972 novel by Edna O'Brien

- Author: Edna O'Brien
- Publication date: 1972
- Publication place: Ireland

Night is a 1972 novel by Irish author Edna O'Brien. The novel is narrated by Mary Hooligan, while she experiences a bout of sleeplessness. Mary has been compared to Molly Bloom.

== Publication history ==
The book was first published by Alfred A. Knopf, and was reprinted by Faber & Faber in 2014.

== Reception ==
Writing in The Guardian, Andrew O'Hagan compared the work favorably to Jacob's Room by Virginia Woolf. O'Brien has said she admires Woolf.

O'Brien has said had she been "sensitive" at the time of publication, she would have "[...] taken a razor to [herself]" in response to its reception at the time.
