= Imagine Me Gone =

2016 novel by Adam Haslett

- Hardcover edition
- Author: Adam Haslett
- Language: English
- Genre: Literary fiction
- Publisher: Little, Brown and Company
- Publication date: 3 May 2016
- Publication place: United States
- Media type: Print (hardcover & paperback)
- Pages: 368 pp.
- ISBN: 978-0-316-26135-7

Imagine Me Gone is a 2016 novel by American author and novelist Adam Haslett. It concerns a couple, Margaret and John, who marry despite John's crippling depression, and is narrated by the couple and their three children. The novel won the Los Angeles Times Book Prize. It was shortlisted for the Kirkus Prize and the Pulitzer Prize for Fiction and longlisted for the National Book Award.

== Reception ==
Critics particularly focused on the quality of Haslett's prose. Lara Feigel, writing for The Guardian called his writing "finely adapted for each of the characters". NPR's Heller McAlpin noted how, "Haslett's signature achievement in Imagine Me Gone is to temper the harrowing with the humorous while keeping a steady bead on the pathos."

== Awards ==
Year	Award	Category	Result	Ref.
2016	Kirkus Prize	Fiction	Finalist	
2016	Los Angeles Times Book Prize	Fiction	Won	
2016	National Book Award	Fiction	Longlisted	
2016	National Book Critics Circle Award	Fiction	Finalist	
2017	Andrew Carnegie Medals for Excellence	Fiction	Longlisted	
2017	Joyce Carol Oates Literary Prize	—	Longlisted	
2017	Pulitzer Prize	Fiction	Finalist	
2017	St. Francis College Literary Prize	—	Shortlisted	
