= August Is a Wicked Month =

Book by Edna O'Brien

- First edition (publ. Jonathan Cape); Cover by Lord Snowdon
- Author: Edna O'Brien
- Publisher: Jonathan Cape
- Publication date: December 1, 1965
- ISBN: 978-2-246-09920-8

August Is a Wicked Month is the 1965 novel by Edna O'Brien, her fourth.

The New York Times claims it featured "one of the best author photographs of the 20th century." That cover was reprinted on the cover of her 2012 memoir Country Girl.

Upon publication August Is a Wicked Month, as with most of O'Brien's early books, was banned in several jurisdictions, including by Ireland's strict Catholic rulers.

The title is regularly mentioned to this day by commentators on topics ranging from business and politics to fashion and weather.
