= Pind Di Kurhi =

Pind Di Kurhi/Kudi (lit. 'Village/Country Girl' in Punjabi) may refer to these Indian films:

- Pind Di Kurhi (1935 film) or Sheela
- Pind Di Kurhi (1963 film)
- Pind Di Kurhi (2005 film)

== See also ==
- Country Girl (disambiguation)
