= Country Girl (memoir) =

Book by Edna O'Brien

- Author: Edna O'Brien
- Publisher: Faber and Faber
- Publication date: 2012

Country Girl is the memoir of Edna O'Brien. Faber and Faber published it in 2012. The title refers to her debut novel The Country Girls, which was banned, burned and denounced upon publication.

Country Girl's cover is a reprint of the photograph used for O'Brien's 1965 novel August Is a Wicked Month.

The Observer said the book "reveal[s] a brave, beautiful and sometimes helpless woman on her journey from repression to creative freedom."

It won in the Irish Non-Fiction Book category at the 2012 Irish Book Awards.
