= Eat the Document (novel) =

2006 novel by Dana Spiotta

- Author: Dana Spiotta
- Language: English
- Publisher: Scribner
- Publication date: November 28, 2006
- Publication place: United States
- Media type: Print (Paperback)
- Pages: 304 pp
- ISBN: 978-0-7432-7300-8
- OCLC: 836720147

Eat the Document is a 2006 novel by American writer Dana Spiotta about New Left activists in the 1970s and their successors a generation later in the 1990s. Its title refers to a 1972 documentary about Bob Dylan. It was a National Book Award finalist and won the Rosenthal Foundation Award from the American Academy of Arts and Letters.

== Plot summary ==
After a domestic bombing campaign against corporations involved in the Vietnam War goes awry in 1972, a leftist cell led by lovers Bobby Desoto and Mary Whittaker goes underground. Mary and Bobby split up and invent new lives for themselves. Mary changes her name, dyes her hair, and moves to Oregon to join a feminist collective. When her identity is discovered, she flees across the country, first to a lesbian commune near Little Falls, New York, and then to Southern California. She ends up as Louise, a placid housewife in a suburb of Seattle raising a son, Jason, by herself after her husband dies in an accident. Jason grows to become an insular, intelligent teenager and aficionado of retro music.

In a parallel plot, Bobby has become Nash Davis, an indifferent owner of an alternative bookstore in Seattle in the late 1990s who convenes ironic leftist discussion groups that never actually undertake the actions they plan. Nash is friends with a chronically ill man named Henry, who has all the symptoms of Agent Orange exposure despite never having served in Vietnam. Nash becomes romantically involved with a fiery young activist named Miranda, but loses her to Josh, an unassuming, calculating young man who, despite his apparent suburban normalcy, has a penchant for computer hacking to aid leftist causes. Josh executes a hack against a mega-corporation that ends up landing him a job there, which he takes for the sake of infiltrating them from the inside (or so he tells Miranda). Eventually, as Josh rises in the corporate ladder, his intentions are no longer clear, and Miranda leaves him. Meanwhile, Jason discovers his mom's secret, as well as Bobby's new identity, and confronts her. The reader learns at this point that a bomb planted by Mary in the home of an executive of a munitions company accidentally killed a maid instead. Jason gives her Bobby's information, and she meets with him for the first time since they went underground. She tells him that she has resolved to turn herself in, but Bobby urges her to turn him in to the authorities to reduce her sentence. She leaves without explicitly accepting his offer, but a few days later Bobby is arrested.

== Reception ==
Writing in The New York Times, Michiko Kakutani described the novel as "an elliptical narrative filled with musical leitmotifs and searing, strobe-lighted images of contemporary life" and notes that Spiotta tackled her chosen theme "with ingenuity, inventiveness and élan." In The Guardian, Matthew Crow declared the book "a triumph" and praised Spiotta's dialogue and plotting. In a mixed review in The New York Times, Julia Scheeres called the novel "fascinating" but criticized its "collage of viewpoints" as distracting from the main storyline.
