= Lantern Slides =

1990 short story collection by Edna O'Brien

- First edition (UK)
- Author: Edna O'Brien
- Language: English
- Publisher: Weidenfeld & Nicolson (UK); Farrar, Straus & Giroux (US)
- Publication date: 1990
- Publication place: Ireland
- Pages: 215
- ISBN: 978-0-297-84019-0

Lantern Slides is a short story collection by Irish author Edna O'Brien and won the 1990 Los Angeles Times Book Prize for Fiction. It contains twelve stories, published in 1990 by Weidenfeld & Nicolson in the UK and by Farrar, Straus & Giroux in the US.

== Stories ==
- "Oft in the Stilly Night" (the title is taken from a song by Thomas Moore) - Set in a small sleepy Irish Village, the intimate lives of the villagers are examined. One of them is Ita McNamara, a sacristan (who looks after the Catholic church). Then one year a missioner is arriving and Ita prepares the church. Shortly after the mission Ita has a nervous breakdown involving her ravishment by a lily in her bed...
- "Brother" - Maisie and her brother Matt live together incestuously. Maisie suspects that her brother is planning to marry as she considers killing his future wife.
- "The Widow" (first published in The New Yorker on 23/1/1989) - Bridget's first husband drowned. She now carefully selects her lodgers, creamery manager Michael now stays permanently at her house and eventually they became engaged. Gossips suspect that her first husband committed suicide but Bridget tries to keep it quiet...
- "Epitaph" (first published in The New Yorker on 27/4/1987) - A woman living in London has a long-term relationship with a married American man, they only meet infrequently as they travel extensively. Her friends tell her that she should find someone else.
- "What a Sky" (first published in The New Yorker on 2/7/1989) - A daughter visits her father in a nursing home run by nuns as he talks about his life, specifically his trip to a convent in New Mexico. She plans to invite him to enjoy lunch at a nearby hotel and to tell him that she has fallen in love with man. But she decides not to follow through the plan.
- "Storm" - Eileen, her son Mark and his wife Polly are on a Spanish beach holiday. Eileen then has an argument with them one night. The following day Mark and Polly spend a day sailing, a violent storm arrives and Eileen is sure that they have drowned...
- "Another Time" (first published in The New Yorker on 14/11/1988)- The narrator, Nelly Nugent a former television announcer escapes to a hotel in Western Ireland with various flashbacks to past experiences, but then she has to wrestle with the present.
- "A Demon" - Meg was going to visit her brother in a monastery, through Portumna and then to fetch her ill sister Nancy from a convent. The hired car had been delayed, with her was her parents, Kitty the doctor's wife and the driver James. When they eventually arrived back home Meg realised that Nancy was pregnant...
- "Dramas" (first published in The Paris Review in issue 110, Spring 1989) - Barry owns a grocery shop and has plans for the village to perform a play. Then two friends arrive to help Barry plan the production. They get drunk and do an impromptu play involving cross dressing which shocks the village. The police are summoned and the two friends and Barry are arrested...
- "Long Distance" (first published in Harper's Magazine in the June 1990 issue) - Two estranged lovers meet again, the man plans a trip with her to Thailand, the woman is planning to break off their relationship.
- "A Little Holiday" (first published in The New Yorker on 19/7/1987) - A daughter plans to have a holiday with her Aunt and Uncle in a dilapidated large country house. But she is unhappy so she returns home.
- "Lantern Slides" - Mr Conroy brought Miss Lawless to a large birthday party for Betty at a grand house in Dublin. Betty's husband has recently left her, with many of the stories linking back to the guests of the party.

== Reception ==
- Publishers Weekly says that the tales are 'enchanting': "O'Brien's passionate, voluble characters display a gift of Irish gab as rich as the teas and jamcakes they savor in their snug country parlors. Most are women and girls in various stages of loneliness, craving, love and regret, some on the edge of madness...The engaging voices in these stories often sound as self-absorbed as overheard soliloquies."
- David Leavitt from The New York Times is generally positive: "her superb new collection, continues the quest for origin and explanation that has preoccupied Ms. O'Brien these past decades. Though she covers little new ground here, she also digs deeper into the old ground than ever before, unearthing a rich archaeology...In this literary universe, passions govern and casually destroy lives; cruelty and pain are as familiar as furniture...Ms. O'Brien writes with a degree of assurance and commitment that can render even the most melodramatic gesture utterly credible...the past - particularly the Irish past - provides a way into knowledge. Her stories unearth the primeval feelings buried just below the surface of nostalgia, using memories to illuminate both what is ridiculous and what is heroic about passion.
- Thomas Cahill from The Los Angeles Times is also positive: "Her plots are devastating, not a happy one among them, though they are intensely full of sensuous joys. Her scenes are both archetypal and resolutely naturalistic--the claustrophobic, incestuous farmhouses of Ireland, the soiled beds of England, the desperate pleasures of a Mediterranean holiday. She writes with the sureness and conviction of a priestess or prophet, one of a long procession of prophetic Irishwomen...Edna O'Brien writes about love and death, the only two things that can ever matter to a great writer. She tells the truth.
- Kirkus Reviews begins: "O'Brien's characters tend to charge after life and experience like huntsmen in full cry, overcoming obstacles--or at least giving them a fair try--and flinching at nothing in their head-long pursuit. The 12 new stories in this collection are no exception: no emotion or experience is secondhand or recollected in tranquility, all is bustle and passionate intensity." and concludes that she "wonderfully evokes the twists-and-turns feelings. of her characters, but sometimes these feelings lack context. Perhaps too much dash and emotion, then, but always affecting."
- Leigh Allison Wilson writing in the Washington Post says "O'Brien's territory ranges from the rural to the urban, from the farm country of Ireland to the coast of Italy to the apartments of London. And in all of these territories she shows a deftness of vision that locates not only character but also its connectedness to time and place. Love, that difficult "rubric against death," is a theme in all these stories...Edna O'Brien moves from the flower of innocence to the taint of self-consciousness and back again as easily as if she were a force of nature. Perhaps she is, for the grace of her characters moves one to reach out, open the senses, extend the fingers, and catch this book in one's arms.
