= The Monsters of Templeton =

2008 novel by Lauren Groff

- Author: Lauren Groff
- Illustrator: Beth White
- Language: English
- Genre: Drama
- Published: 2008 Hyperion
- Publication place: United States
- Media type: Print (Paperback)
- Pages: 366
- ISBN: 978-1-4013-2225-0
- OCLC: 166372872
- Dewey Decimal: 813/.6 22
- LC Class: PS3607.R6344 M66 2008

The Monsters of Templeton is a dramatic novel written by Lauren Groff. Groff was born and raised in Cooperstown, New York. The name Templeton draws from the name devised for the town by James Fenimore Cooper, Cooperstown's most renowned author, known for The Leatherstocking Tales. Groff draws in many of the legends of Cooperstown, especially those crafted by Cooper himself, and ties them together over the expanses of time, then weaves them in with fictional modern-day events. The book was released to great critical acclaim.

== Plot summary ==
Willie Upton returns home to Templeton for the summer from her graduate studies in archaeology with several dark secrets. Her life seemingly in shambles, she moves back in with her mother for the summer. She never knew the identity of her real father and her mother gives her the shocking revelation that her real father is alive and living in Templeton, but it is up to Willie to dig up the deep dark secrets of the small town and thus discover his identity. She excavates data from the local archives and from ancient books and letters. She gradually pieces together her family tree. While all of this is going on, Willie is concerned in the present about a possible pregnancy, about her sick friend she left back in California, about her mother's relationship with a local preacher, about her old acquaintance Zeke and of course about Glimmey, the kindly but now dead lake monster. In the end she discovers the true identity of her father and that she was closer to him than she ever could have thought.

== Characters ==
=== Main characters ===
- Willie Upton, a scholarly free spirit returns home to Templeton from graduate school. We follow her archaeological work as she excavates her past.
- Vivienne Upton, Willie's mother, an ex-hippie turned born-again Christian, has a hidden secret of her own.
- Marmaduke Temple, scion of the Temple family, founder of Templeton and ancestor of Willie. The name being borrowed from James Fenimore Cooper's The Pioneers

=== Minor characters ===
- The Running Buds, a group of older men who have been running together for decades and who, in a way, have adopted Willie as the honorary daughter of the group.
- Dr. Primus Dwyer, married west coast college professor and love interest of Willie.
- Zeke, a down to earth, local tow-truck driver who harbors romantic feelings for Willie.
- The Ghost, this amicable spirit resides in Averell Cottage, the family ancestral home.
- Glimmey, the sensitive sea monster who makes his home in the depths of Lake Glimmerglass, and in his quiet way, captures the soul and the essence of Templeton.

== Reviews ==
- Bad Apples and Blue Eyes: Shaking Loose Secrets From the Family Tree by Janet Maslin, New York Times, February 18, 2008
- The town's changed, and it isn't just that thing in the lake by Laurel Maury, SFGate, Sunday, February 17, 2008
- In The Monsters of Templeton,' Cooperstown run amok by Yvonne Zipp, Christian Science Monitor, February 12, 2008
