= Anna Dorn =

American writer

Anna Dorn is an American author and editor known for her satirical novels exploring modern culture. Notable works include "Vagablonde" (2020), "Exalted," "Bad Lawyer," and "Perfume & Pain." Her writing is a mix of humor and social commentary, often focusing on contemporary issues. She was recognized as a Lambda Literary Fellow, with "Exalted" being a finalist for the L.A. Times Book Prize.

== Career ==
Prior to becoming an author, Dorn worked as a criminal defense attorney. She graduated from UC Berkeley Law. She graduated from Antioch University's MFA program in 2017.

Her 2022 novel Exalted, a satire of the online astrology world, was a finalist for the Los Angeles Times Book Prize.

Dorn's latest novel is Perfume & Pain, which she began writing in 2021 while she reflected on how cancel culture impacted her work. Legendary Television acquired the rights to Perfume & Pain, with Clea DuVall planning to write and direct the series.

== Novels ==
- Vagablonde (2020)
- Bad Lawyer: A Memoir of Law and Disorder (2021)
- Exalted (2022)
- Perfume & Pain (2024)
- American Spirits (2026)
