= Edna O'Brien =

Irish writer (1930–2024)

Edna O'Brien DBE
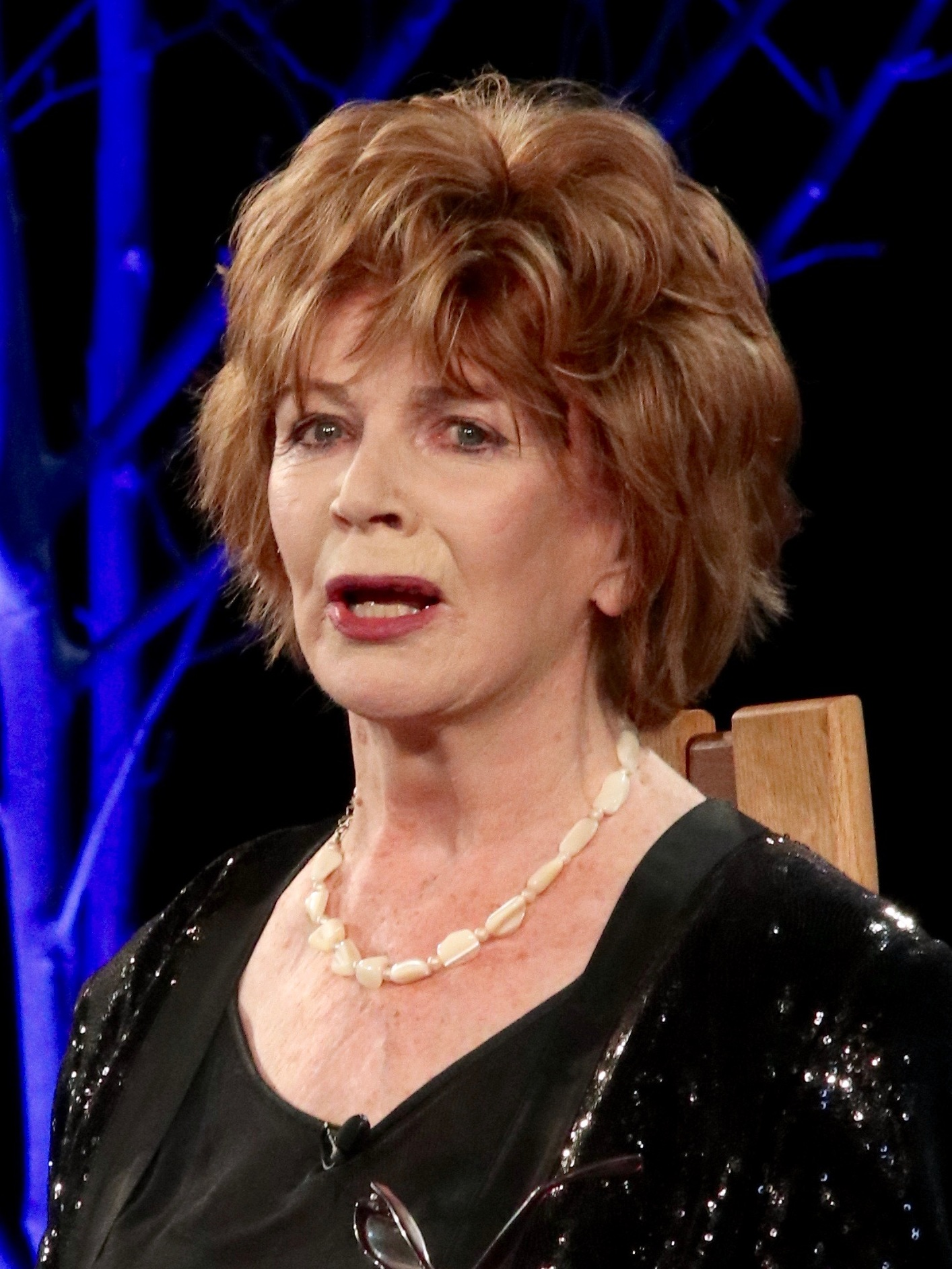
- O'Brien at the Hay Festival in 2016
- Born: Josephine Edna O'Brien; 15 December 1930; Tuamgraney, County Clare, Ireland
- Died: 27 July 2024 (aged 93); London, England
- Resting place: Inis Cealtra, County Clare
- Occupations: Novelist; memoirist; playwright; poet; short-story writer
- Spouse: Ernest Gébler (m. 1954; div. 1964)
- Children: 2, including Carlo Gébler
- Writing career
- Language: English
- Period: 1960–2019
- Notable works: The Country Girls; Girl with Green Eyes; Girls in Their Married Bliss; August Is a Wicked Month; Casualties of Peace; House of Splendid Isolation; Down by the River; Wild Decembers; In the Forest; The Light of Evening; Saints and Sinners; Country Girl; The Little Red Chairs; Girl
- Notable awards: Los Angeles Times Book Prize for Fiction 1990; Irish PEN Award 2001; Frank O'Connor International Short Story Award 2011; Saoi of Aosdána 2015; David Cohen Prize 2019; Ordre des Arts et des Lettres – Commandeur 2021

Josephine Edna O'Brien DBE (15 December 1930 – 27 July 2024) was an Irish novelist, memoirist, playwright, poet and short-story writer.

O'Brien's works often revolve around the inner feelings of women and their problems relating to men and society as a whole. Her first novel, The Country Girls (1960), has been credited with breaking silence on sexual matters and social issues during a repressive period in Ireland after the Second World War. The book was banned and denounced from the pulpit. Many of her novels were translated into French. Her memoir, Country Girl, was published in 2012, and her last novel, Girl, was published in 2019. Many of her novels were based in Ireland, especially in County Clare, but Girl was a fictional account of a victim of the 2014 Chibok kidnapping in Nigeria.

In 2015, O'Brien was elected to Aosdána by her fellow artists and honoured with the title Saoi. She was the recipient of many other awards and honours, winning the Irish PEN Award in 2001 and the biennial David Cohen Prize in 2019. France made her a Commandeur de l'Ordre des Arts et des Lettres in 2021. Her short story collection Saints and Sinners won the 2011 Frank O'Connor International Short Story Award, the world's richest prize for that genre.

== Early life and education ==
Josephine Edna O'Brien was born on 15 December 1930 to farmer Michael O'Brien and Lena Cleary, at Tuamgraney in County Clare, Ireland, a place she would later describe as "fervid" and "enclosed". She had a Roman Catholic upbringing and was the youngest child of "a strict, religious family". The family lived at "Drewsborough" (also "Drewsboro"), a "large two-storey house", which her mother kept in "semi-grandeur". Michael O'Brien, "whose family had seen wealthier times" as landowners, had inherited a "thousand acres or more" and "a fortune from rich uncles", but was a "profligate" hard-drinker who gambled away his inheritance, the land "sold off in bits ... or bartered to pay debts". Her mother, Lena, "came from a poorer background". According to O'Brien, her mother was a strong, controlling woman, who had emigrated temporarily to America and worked for some time as a maid in Brooklyn, New York, for a well-off Irish-American family, before returning to Ireland to raise her family.

From 1941 to 1946, O'Brien was educated at St. Raphael's College, a boarding school run by the Sisters of Mercy in Loughrea, County Galway, a circumstance that contributed to a "suffocating" childhood. She recalled: "I rebelled against the coercive and stifling religion into which I was born and bred. It was very frightening and all-pervasive. I'm glad it has gone." Because she deeply missed her mother, she became fond of a nun and tried to identify the nun with herself.

In 1950, having studied at night at a pharmaceutical college and worked in a Dublin pharmacy during the day, O'Brien was awarded a licence as a pharmacist.

== Career ==
In Ireland, O'Brien read such writers as Tolstoy, Thackeray, and F. Scott Fitzgerald. In Dublin, she bought Introducing James Joyce, with an introduction written by T. S. Eliot, and said later that when she learned that James Joyce's A Portrait of the Artist as a Young Man was autobiographical, it made her realise where she might turn, should she want to write herself. "Unhappy houses are a very good incubation for stories," she said.

In London, she started work as a reader for Hutchinson, where, based on her reports, she was commissioned for £50 to write a novel. She published her first book, The Country Girls, in 1960. It was the first part of a trilogy of novels (later collected as The Country Girls Trilogy), which included The Lonely Girl (1962) and Girls in Their Married Bliss (1964). Shortly after their publication, the books were placed on the censorship index and banned in her native country because of their frank portrayals of the sex lives of their characters. O'Brien herself was accused of "corrupting the minds of young women". She later said, "I felt no fame. I was married. I had young children. All I could hear out of Ireland from my mother and anonymous letters was bile and odium and outrage". The book was also denounced from the pulpit. It had been claimed that copies of The Country Girls were burned when it was published, but according to Mary Kenny, in a letter to The Times in July 2024, an investigation in 2015 found no witnesses or evidence and it was concluded that the story was probably "legend rather than fact".

Many of O'Brien's novels were not well received in Ireland. Her fourth novel, August Is a Wicked Month (1965), in which an unhappily married woman has a "sensual awakening on the French Riviera", was excoriated in the press and banned in Ireland. In The Forest (2002), a fictional account of a notorious Irish murder, was described by Irish Times critic Fintan O'Toole as "morally criminal".

In the 1960s, O'Brien was a patient of Scottish psychiatrist R. D. Laing: "I thought he might be able to help me. He couldn't do that – he was too mad himself – but he opened doors", she said later. Her novel, A Pagan Place (1970), was about her repressive childhood. Her parents were vehemently against all things related to literature and her mother strongly disapproved of her daughter's career as a writer. Once, when her mother found a Seán O'Casey book in her daughter's possession, she tried to burn it.

Alongside Teddy Taylor (Conservative), Michael Foot (Labour) and Derek Worlock (Catholic Archbishop of Liverpool), O'Brien was a panel member for the first edition of the BBC's Question Time in 1979, and was awarded the first answer in the programme's history ("Edna O'Brien, you were born there", referring to Ireland). Taylor's death in 2017 left her the sole surviving member. In 1980, she wrote a play, Virginia, about Virginia Woolf, which was first staged in June 1980 at the Stratford Festival, Ontario, Canada. It was subsequently performed in the West End of London, at the Theatre Royal Haymarket, starring Maggie Smith, and directed by Robin Phillips. The play was staged at The Public Theater in New York in 1985. Also in 1980, O'Brien appeared alongside Patrick McGoohan in the TV movie The Hard Way.

Other works by O'Brien included a biography of James Joyce, published in 1999, and a biography of the poet Lord Byron, Byron in Love, in 2009. House of Splendid Isolation (1994), her novel about a terrorist who goes on the run, marked a new phase in her writing career. Part of her research involved visiting Irish republican Dominic McGlinchey, later shot dead, whom she called "a grave and reflective man", and "most reflective and at the same time most forthcoming". She told Marianne Heron, of the Irish Independent, that she had told McGlinchey "that she liked everything about him except what he was [and] he told her that his mother said the same thing". O'Brien denied having an affair with McGlinchey, and claimed later that, as a result of her research, she had to refute questions as to whether she "had love affairs with republicans".

Down by the River (1996) concerned an underage rape victim who sought an abortion in England, the "Miss X case". In the Forest (2002) dealt with the real-life case of Brendan O'Donnell, who abducted and murdered a woman, her three-year-old son, and a priest, in rural Ireland.

O'Brien's last novel, Girl (2019), was based on the abduction of 276 schoolgirls in Nigeria in 2014. She travelled to that country twice to do research, which included interviewing numerous people, from "escaped girls, their mothers and sisters, to trauma specialists, doctors and Unicef". She later said that she had tried to create a "kind of mythic story from all this pain and horror", and was disappointed by its poor reception in the US, although it was well received in France and Germany. In 2020, she opened the Avignon theatre festival with a reading from the book. Poet Imtiaz Dharker, judge for the 2019 David Cohen Prize, said about Girl: "I thought I had the course of O'Brien's work mapped out before the judging came around, and then, towards the end of the process, another great tome dropped through the letterbox, changing the whole terrain". O'Brien regarded Girl as a continuation of the focus of her career, "to chart and get inside the mind, soul, heart and emotion of girls in some form of restriction, some form of life that isn't easy, but who find a way to literally plough their way through and come out as winners of sort – maybe not getting prizes – but come through their experiences and live to tell the tale. It is a theme I have lived and often cried with".

Her work includes references to Irish lore and history and mentions of distinctive geographic features such as Druids' circles, Inis Cealtra, and Lough Derg, County Donegal.

Many of her works were translated into French, with The Country Girls translation published in 1960 by Éditions Julliard and in 1962 by Presses de la Cité. Later titles were published by Gallimard and then by Fayard. In 2010, O'Brien formed an exclusive relationship with publisher Sabine Wespieser. Her work was much loved in France, "both for the quality of her writing but also for her universal struggles which received a particular resonance in France" (French Embassy in London). After the publication of Girl in 2019, she featured in a number of French publications, including Télérama, Elle, Le Monde des Livres, and Le Journal du Dimanche.

Emory University in Atlanta, Georgia, US, holds her papers from 1939 to 2000. More recent papers are held at University College Dublin. In September 2021, it was announced that O'Brien would be donating her archive to the National Library of Ireland. The library was to hold papers from O'Brien covering the period of 2000 to 2021, including correspondence, drafts, notes and revisions.

== Personal life ==
In 1954, O'Brien met in Dublin and married, against her parents' wishes, the Irish writer Ernest Gébler who was of Czech origin and 16 years her senior. The couple moved to London in 1959, where, as she later put it, "We lived in SW 20. Sub-urb-ia". They had two sons, Sasha, an architect who lives in London, and writer Carlo Gébler, but the marriage ended in 1964. Initially believing he deserved credit for helping her become an accomplished writer, Ernest came to believe he was the author of O'Brien's books. In 2009, Carlo revealed that his parents' marriage had been volatile, with bitter rows between his mother and father over her success. Ernest Gébler died in 1998.

O'Brien remained in London until her death, although she often visited Ireland. In 2020, at the age of 90, she was renting a flat in Chelsea.

The reaction to The Country Girls in Ireland damaged her relationship with her mother, who was ashamed of her daughter. (Her mother died in 1977.) The press often portrayed O'Brien as a "party girl", with American magazine Vanity Fair calling her "the playgirl of the western world". She socialised with glamorous men such as Marlon Brando and Robert Mitchum, but said later that she was "doing the cooking" at most of the parties.

=== Death and legacy ===
Edna O'Brien died following a long illness in London, England, on 27 July 2024, at the age of 93. She is buried on Inis Cealtra (Holy Island), an island in Lough Derg.

According to Scottish novelist Andrew O'Hagan, O'Brien's place in Irish letters is assured: "She changed the nature of Irish fiction; she brought the woman's experience and sex and internal lives of those people on to the page, and she did it with style, and she made those concerns international." Irish novelist Colum McCann avers that O'Brien has been "the advance scout for the Irish imagination" for over fifty years.

Irish president Michael D. Higgins, also a writer and poet, wrote: "Through that deeply insightful work, rich in humanity, Edna O'Brien was one of the first writers to provide a true voice to the experiences of women in Ireland in their different generations and played an important role in transforming the status of women across Irish society".

A documentary film Blue Road - The Edna O'Brien Story, by Sinéad O'Shea, premiered at the 2024 Toronto International Film Festival, and was released in Irish cinemas in January, and broadcast by Sky Arts in June 2025. The documentary is based on her journals (narrated by Jessie Buckley), and includes interviews with O'Brien and others.

== Recognition, awards and honours ==
Philip Roth once described her as "the most gifted woman now writing in English". A former president of Ireland, Mary Robinson, cited her as "one of the great creative writers of her generation". Others who hailed her as one of the greatest writers of her time included John Banville, Michael Ondaatje and Ian McKellen.

O'Brien's awards included the Yorkshire Post Book Award in 1970 (for A Pagan Place) and 'Book of the Year' in 1972; the Los Angeles Times Book Prize in 1990 for Lantern Slides; the Writers' Guild Award for best fiction (1993); the European Prize for Literature (1995); and a lifetime achievement award from Irish writers' society PEN in 2001. In 2006, she was appointed adjunct professor of English Literature in University College Dublin.

In 2009, O'Brien was honoured with the Bob Hughes Lifetime Achievement Award during a special ceremony at the year's Irish Book Awards in Dublin. Her collection Saints and Sinners won the 2011 Frank O'Connor International Short Story Award, with judge Thomas McCarthy referring to her as "the Solzhenitsyn of Irish life". RTÉ aired a documentary on her as part of its Arts strand in early 2012. In 2017, for her contributions to literature, she was appointed an honorary Dame Commander of the Order of the British Empire.

O'Brien was presented with the Torc of the Saoi of Aosdána in 2015 by Irish President Michael D. Higgins. In 2024, Higgins noted that her "election as Saoi, chosen by her fellow artists, was the ultimate expression of the esteem in which her work is held". He presented her with the Presidential Distinguished Service Award in 2018.

In 2019, O'Brien was awarded the David Cohen Prize for Literature at a ceremony in London. The £40,000 prize, awarded every two years in recognition of a living writer's lifetime achievement in literature, has been described as the "UK and Ireland Nobel in literature". Judge David Park said "In winning the David Cohen Prize, Edna O'Brien adds her name to a literary roll call of honour". Girl (2019) was nominated for two awards in France: the Prix Médicis and the Prix Femina étranger. In March 2021, France announced that it would be naming O'Brien a Commandeur de l'Ordre des Arts et des Lettres, the country's highest honour for the arts.

Other honours and awards include:

- 1962: Writing in The Observer in 1960, Kingsley Amis said that The Country Girls deserved his "personal first-novel prize of the year". This comment was frequently interpreted as referring to a formal "Kingsley Amis Award", including by O'Brien's publishers, but no such literary prize exists.
- 1970: The Yorkshire Post Book Award (Book of the Year), for A Pagan Place
- 1990: Los Angeles Times Book Prize for Fiction, for Lantern Slides
- 1991: Premio Grinzane Cavour (Italy), for Girl with Green Eyes
- 1993: Writers' Guild Award (Best Fiction), for Time and Tide
- 1995: European Prize for Literature (European Association for the Arts), for House of Splendid Isolation
- 2000: Golden Plate Award of the American Academy of Achievement
- 2001: Irish PEN Award
- 2006: Ulysses Medal (University College Dublin)
- 2009: Bob Hughes Lifetime Achievement Award
- 2010: Shortlisted for Irish Book of the Decade (Irish Book Awards), for In the Forest
- 2012: Irish Book Awards (Irish Non-Fiction Book), for Country Girl
- 2018: PEN/Nabokov Award
- 2019: David Cohen Prize
- 2019: Prix Femina spécial, awarded in honour of her whole body of work; the first time a non-French author had won it
- 2021: Commandeur de l'Ordre des Arts et des Lettres (France)

== Works ==
=== Novels ===
- 1960: The Country Girls (ISBN 0-14-001851-4)
- 1962: The Lonely Girl later published as Girl with Green Eyes (ISBN 0-14-002108-6)
- 1964: Girls in Their Married Bliss (ISBN 0-14-002649-5)
- 1965: August Is a Wicked Month (ISBN 0-14-002720-3)
- 1966: Casualties of Peace (ISBN 0-14-002875-7)
- 1970: A Pagan Place (ISBN 0-297-00027-6)
- 1972: Night (ISBN 0-297-99541-3)
- 1977: Johnny I Hardly Knew You (ISBN 0 -297-77284-8); in US, "I Hardly Knew You" (ISBN 0-140-04772-7)
- 1987: The Country Girls Trilogy with new epilogue (ISBN 0-14-010984-6)
- 1988: The High Road (ISBN 0-297-79493-0)
- 1992: Time and Tide (ISBN 0-670-84552-3)
- 1994: House of Splendid Isolation (ISBN 0-297-81460-5)
- 1996: Down by the River (ISBN 0-297-81806-6)
- 1999: Wild Decembers (ISBN 0-297-64576-5)
- 2002: In the Forest (ISBN 0-297-60732-4)
- 2006: The Light of Evening (ISBN 0-618-71867-2)
- 2015: The Little Red Chairs (ISBN 0-316-37823-2)
- 2019: Girl (ISBN 0-374-16255-7)

=== Short story collections ===
- 1968: The Love Object and Other Stories (ISBN 0-14-003104-9)
- 1974: A Scandalous Woman and Other Stories (ISBN 0-297-76735-6)
- 1978: Mrs Reinhardt and Other Stories (ISBN 0-297-77476-X)
- 1982: Returning (ISBN 0-297-78052-2)
- 1985: A Fanatic Heart (ISBN 0-297-78607-5)
- 1990: Lantern Slides (ISBN 0-297-84019-3)
- 2011: Saints and Sinners (ISBN 0316122726)
- 2013: The Love Object: Selected Stories, a fifty-year retrospective, (ISBN 978-0-316-37826-0)

=== Drama ===
- 1973: "A Pagan Place" (ISBN 0-571-10316-2)
- 1975: Zee and Co (ISBN 978-0140033250)
- 1980: Virginia (ISBN 0-15-693560-0)
- 2005: Family Butchers
- 2005: Triptych and Iphigenia (ISBN 978-0802141545)
- 2009: Haunted
- 2011: "The Country Girls" (ISBN 978-0-571-29669-9)
- 2014: "Joyce's Women" (ISBN 0571377858)

=== Screenplays ===
- 1971: "Zee & Co." (ISBN 0-297-00336-4)

=== Nonfiction books ===
- 1976: Mother Ireland, (ISBN 0-297-77110-8)
- 1977: Arabian Days (ISBN 978-0704321502)
- 1979: Some Irish Loving, as editor: anthology (ISBN 0-297-77581-2)
- 1981: James & Nora (ISBN 978-1-4746-1682-9); reprinted in 2020
- 1986: Vanishing Ireland (with photographs by Richard Fitzgerald), (ISBN 978-0224024242)
- 1999: James Joyce, biography (ISBN 0-297-84243-9)
- 2009: Byron in Love, biography (ISBN 978-0-393-07011-8)
- 2012: Country Girl, memoir (ISBN 978-0316122702)

=== Children's books ===
- 1981: The Dazzle (ISBN 9780340264911)
- 1982: A Christmas Treat (ISBN 978-0340279717)
- 1983: The Rescue (ISBN 0-340-33896-2)
- 2017: Tales for the Telling, (ISBN 978-1786750327)

=== Poetry collections ===
- 1989: On the Bone (ISBN 0-906887-38-0)

=== Short stories ===
Title	Publication	Collected in
"Orphan on the Run"	The Saturday Evening Post (6 August 1955)	-
"Summer Encounter"	The Saturday Evening Post (21 December 1957)	-
"Irish Revel" aka "Come Into the Drawing Room, Doris"	The New Yorker (6 October 1962)	The Love Object
"The Small Town Lovers" aka "The Lovers"	The New Yorker (16 February 1963)	Mrs. Reinhardt
"The Rug"	The New Yorker (16 March 1963)	The Love Object
"Sister Imelda"	Winter's Tales 9 (1963); The New Yorker (9 November 1981)	Returning
"An Outing" aka "Lovely to Look At, Delightful to Hold"	The New Yorker (28 March 1964)	The Love Object
"Cords" aka "Which of Those Two Ladies Is He Married To?"	The New Yorker (25 April 1964)	The Love Object
"My First Love"	Ladies' Home Journal (June 1965)	-
"How to Grow a Wisteria" aka "Let the Rest of the World Go By"	Ladies' Home Journal (July 1965)	The Love Object
"A Woman by the Seaside" aka "A Woman at the Seaside"	Nova (August 1965)	Mrs. Reinhardt
"The Love Object"	The New Yorker (13 May 1967)	The Love Object
"The Mouth of the Cave"	The Love Object (July 1968)	The Love Object
"Paradise"	The Love Object (July 1968)	The Love Object
"Brothers and Sisters"	Transatlantic Review 30 (Autumn 1968)	-
"Ma"	The New Yorker (22 July 1972)	from Night
"Over"	The New Yorker (2 December 1972)	A Scandalous Woman
"The Creature"	The New Yorker (30 July 1973)	A Scandalous Woman
"Love-Child"	The New Yorker (29 October 1973)	A Scandalous Woman
"Honeymoon"	Cosmopolitan (December 1973)	A Scandalous Woman
"A Journey"	The New Yorker (11 February 1974)	A Scandalous Woman
"The Favourite"	The New Yorker (11 March 1974)	A Scandalous Woman
"The House of My Dreams"	The New Yorker (12 August 1974)	A Scandalous Woman
"A Scandalous Woman"	A Scandalous Woman (1974)	A Scandalous Woman
"Sisters"	A Scandalous Woman (1974)	A Scandalous Woman
"Forgetting" aka "The Jewel"	Viva (April 1975)	Mrs. Reinhardt
"Baby Blue"	The New Yorker (9 June 1975)	Mrs. Reinhardt
"The Classroom"	The New Yorker (21 July 1975)	-
"Ways"	The New Yorker (9 February 1976)	Mrs. Reinhardt
"Number Ten"	The New Yorker (16 August 1976)	Mrs. Reinhardt
"In the Hours of Darkness"	The New Yorker (13 September 1976)	Mrs. Reinhardt
"Christmas Roses"	The Atlantic (December 1977)	Mrs. Reinhardt
"A Rose in the Heart of New York" aka "A Rose in the Heart"	The New Yorker (1 May 1978)	Mrs. Reinhardt
"Mary"	Punch (1978)	Mrs. Reinhardt
"Clara"	Mrs. Reinhardt (May 1978)	Mrs. Reinhardt
"Mrs. Reinhardt"	Mrs. Reinhardt (May 1978)	Mrs. Reinhardt
"Starting"	The New Yorker (4 September 1978)	A Rose in the Heart
"Green Georgette"	The New Yorker (23 October 1978)	Saints and Sinners
"My Mother's Mother" aka "Far Away in Australia" aka "Kin"	The New Yorker (25 December 1978)	Returning
"Ghosts"	The New Yorker (9 April 1979)	Returning
"Violets"	The New Yorker (5 November 1979)	A Fanatic Heart
"The Doll"	Redbook (December 1979)	Returning
"The Call"	The New Yorker (3 December 1979)	A Fanatic Heart
"The Plan"	The New Yorker (25 February 1980)	A Fanatic Heart
"The Return"	The New Yorker (2 February 1981)	A Fanatic Heart
"The Connor Girls" aka "The Conner Girls"	The New Yorker (9 March 1981)	Returning
"Savages"	The New Yorker (18 January 1982)	Returning
"The Bachelor"	The New Yorker (8 March 1982)	Returning
"Tough Men"	Returning (1982)	Returning
"Courtship"	Returning (1982)	Returning
"Storm" aka "A Long Way from Home"	Redbook (May 1985)	Lantern Slides
"Epitaph"	The New Yorker (27 April 1987)	Lantern Slides
"A Little Holiday"	The New Yorker (27 July 1987)	Lantern Slides
"Another Time"	The New Yorker (14 November 1988)	Lantern Slides
"The Widow"	The New Yorker (23 January 1989)	Lantern Slides
"Dramas"	The Paris Review 110 (Spring 1989)	Lantern Slides
"A Demon" aka "A Day Out"	The New Yorker (24 April 1989)	Lantern Slides
"What a Sky"	The New Yorker (10 July 1989)	Lantern Slides
"Lantern Sldes"	The New Yorker (1 January 1990)	Lantern Slides
"Brother"	Antaeus 64/65 (Spring-Autumn 1990)	Lantern Slides
"Long Distance"	Harper's (June 1990)	Lantern Slides
"Oft in the Stilly Night"	Lantern Slides (1990)	Lantern Slides
"No Place"	The New Yorker (17 June 1991)	from Time and Tide
"The Cut"	The New Yorker (4 November 1991)	from Time and Tide
"Wilderness"	The New Yorker (16 March 1992)	from Time and Tide
"A Bed of Roses"	The Spectator (18-25 December 1993)	-
"Sinners" aka "Sin"	The New Yorker (11 July 1994)	Saints and Sinners
"Manhattan Medley" aka "Love's Lesson	Zoetrope: All-Story (Summer 1998)	Saints and Sinners
"My Two Mothers" aka "Forbidden"	The New Yorker (20 March 2000)	Saints and Sinners
"A Boy in the Forest"	The New Yorker (4 February 2002)	from In the Forest
"Send My Roots Rain"	The Times (10 May 2009)	Saints and Sinners
"Old Wounds"	The New Yorker (8-15 June 2009)	Saints and Sinners
"Shovel Kings"	The Atlantic & Kindle (December 2009)	Saints and Sinners
"Inner Cowboy"	Subtropics 11/12 (Winter-Spring 2011)	Saints and Sinners
"Black Flower"	The Times (30 January 2011)	Saints and Sinners
"Madame Cassandra"	Saints and Sinners (May 2011)	Saints and Sinners
"Plunder"	Saints and Sinners (May 2011)	Saints and Sinners

== See also ==
- List of Irish writers
- List of Irish dramatists
