= Fates and Furies (novel) =

2015 novel by Lauren Groff

- Author: Lauren Groff
- Cover artist: Rodrigo Corral
- Language: English
- Publisher: Riverhead Books
- Publication date: September 15, 2015
- Publication place: United States
- Media type: Print (hardback & paperback)
- Pages: 390 (hardcover)
- ISBN: 9781594634475 (hardcover)
- OCLC: 900623942
- LC Class: PS3607.R6344 F38 2015

Fates and Furies (2015) is the third novel by the American author Lauren Groff.

== Background ==
Fates and Furies takes place in the United States and examines how different people in a relationship can have disparate views on the relationship. According to Groff, she originally envisioned the novel as two separate books, but she was encouraged by her agent to rewrite them as one integrated work. The novel is influenced by Greek mythology; deities and vengeance are themes throughout.

== Reception ==
Fates and Furies was nominated for a National Book Award. The book received extensive press attention, including from Carrie Brownstein, Sarah Jessica Parker, and President Barack Obama, who said he enjoyed the book more than anything else he had read that year. The novel was also compared to Gillian Flynn's thriller Gone Girl.

Positive reviews noted the novel as "masterful", while negative reviews focused on moments of implausibility in the novel's second half.

It won the 2016 Indies Choice Book Award in Adult Fiction.
