= Dana Spiotta =

American novelist (born 1966)

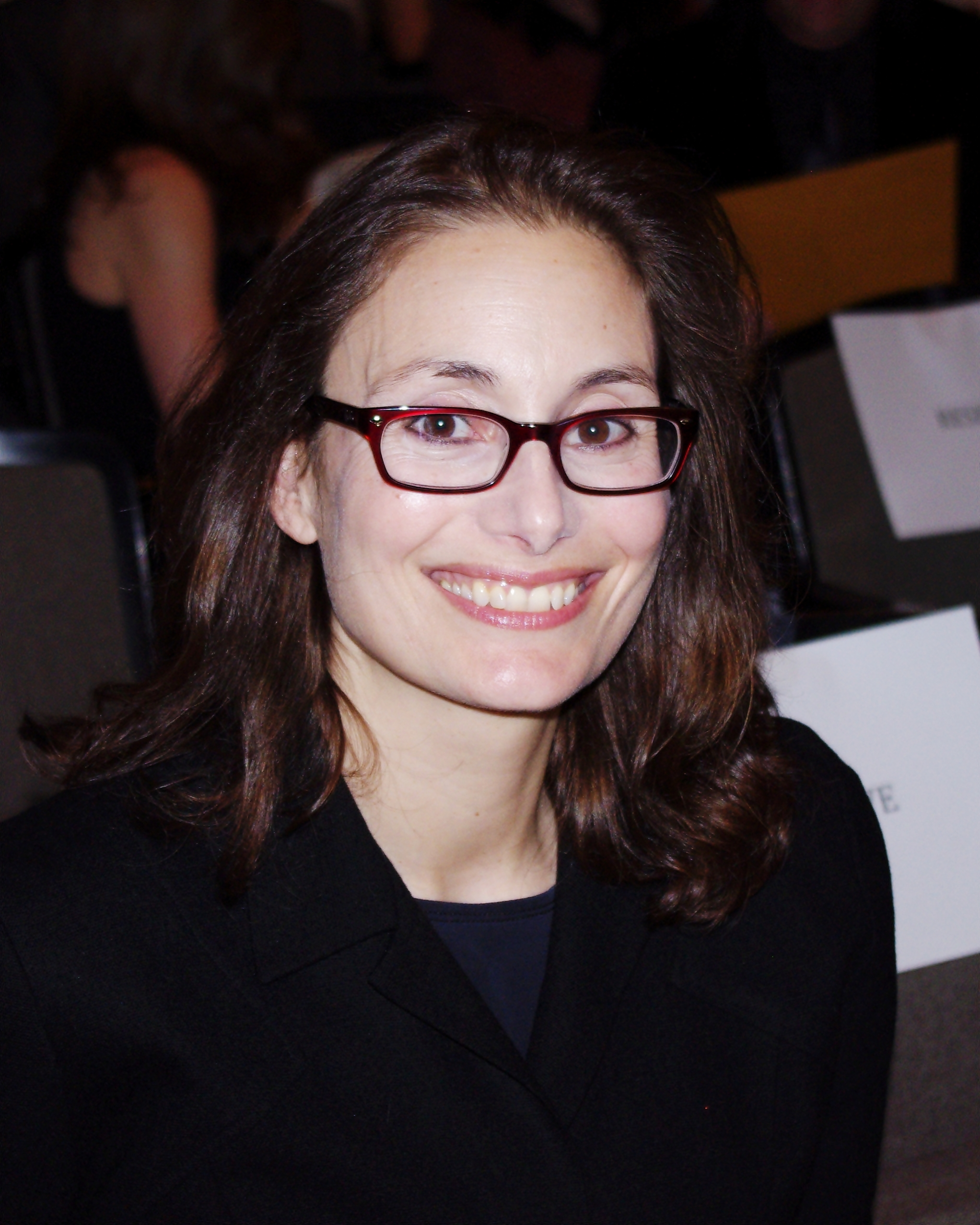
- Spiotta at the National Book Critics Circle Awards in March 2012.
- Born: 1966 (age 59–60); New Jersey, US
- Education: Evergreen State College; Columbia University
- Occupation: Novelist
- Employer: Syracuse University
- Awards: Guggenheim Fellowship; New York Foundation for the Arts Fellowship; Rome Prize (2009)
- Website: danaspiotta.com

Dana Spiotta (born 1966) is an American author. She was a recipient of the Rome Prize in Literature, a Guggenheim Fellowship, the John Updike Award from the American Academy of Arts and Letters, and a New York Foundation for the Arts Fellowship.

She is the author of five novels. Innocents and Others (2016) won the St. Francis College Literary Prize. Stone Arabia (2011) was a National Book Critics Circle Award finalist. Eat the Document (2006) was a National Book Award finalist and won the Rosenthal Foundation Award from the American Academy of Arts and Letters. Lightning Field (2001) was a New York Times Notable Book of the year.

In 2021, Spiotta published Wayward, which concerns four women: Sam Raymond, a perimenopausal woman; Ally Raymond, Sam's daughter; Lily, Sam's mother; and Clara Loomis, a fictitious 19th Century suffragette who ran away to the Oneida Community as a young woman. Wayward was a New York Times Critics' Top Pick of 2021 and a New York Times Notable Book of the Year.

== Biography ==
Spiotta was born in 1966 in New Jersey. Her father, son of Italian immigrants, worked for Mobil Oil, and his constant moving made Spiotta a perennial "new-kid". Her parents met at Hofstra University while acting in a production of A Streetcar Named Desire directed by fellow student Francis Ford Coppola. In 1979, her father began running Coppola's Zoetrope Studios. She attended Crossroads School and went on to Columbia University, but dropped out at the end of her sophomore year. She moved to Seattle and eventually enrolled at Evergreen State College and studied labor history and creative writing.

She teaches in the Syracuse University MFA creative writing program along with George Saunders, Mary Karr. Spiotta lives in Syracuse, New York with her daughter and her husband, writer Jonathan Dee.

== Works ==
- Lightning Field. Scribner. 2001. ISBN 978-0743212618.
- Eat the Document. Scribner. 2006. ISBN 9780743272988.
- Stone Arabia. Scribner. 2011. ISBN 9781451617962.
- Innocents and Others. Scribner. 2016. ISBN 9781501122729.
- Wayward. Knopf. 2021. ISBN 9780593318737.
