= Lauren Groff =

American writer (born 1978)

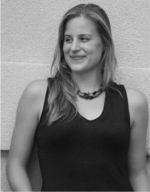
- Born: July 23, 1978 (age 48); Cooperstown, New York, U.S.
- Education: Amherst College (BA); University of Wisconsin–Madison (MFA)
- Occupation: Novelist
- Spouse: Clayton Kallman
- Relatives: Sarah True (sister)
- Writing career
- Genre: Literary fiction
- Website: laurengroff.com

Lauren Groff (born July 23, 1978) is an American novelist and short story writer. She has written five novels and three short story collections, including Delicate Edible Birds (2009), Fates and Furies (2015), Matrix (2021), The Vaster Wilds (2023), and Brawler (2026). Lauren and her husband Clay Kallman founded The Lynx Bookstore, in Gainesville, Florida.

She was named one of the 100 most influential people by Time in 2024.

== Early life and education ==
Groff, the second child of Jeannine and Gerald Groff, was born and raised in Cooperstown, New York. She graduated from Amherst College and from the University of Wisconsin–Madison with a Master of Fine Arts degree in fiction. She began her writing career while living and studying at Madison where she wrote a significant portion of her early fiction. At Amherst College, Groff studied literature and creative writing, majoring in English and French. She developed her interest in becoming a novelist and participating on the women's rowing team. While at Amherst, she completed a senior thesis examining the relationship between fact and fiction in autobiography and took courses in medieval French and Afro-Caribbean literature as well as creative writing. Her experiences at Amherst later influenced her writing routine and the athletic themes present in works such as Brawler and "Lucky Chow Fun."

== Career ==
Groff's first novel, The Monsters of Templeton, was published by Hyperion on February 5, 2008, and debuted on The New York Times Best Seller list. It was well received by Stephen King, who read it before publication and wrote an early review in Entertainment Weekly. The novel was shortlisted for the Orange Prize for New Writers in 2008, and named one of the Best Books of 2008 by Amazon.com and the San Francisco Chronicle.

The Monsters of Templeton is a contemporary tale about coming home to Templeton, a representation of Cooperstown, New York. It is interspersed with voices from characters drawn from the town's history as well as James Fenimore Cooper's The Pioneers, which is also set in a fictionalized Cooperstown called Templeton.

Groff's first collection of short stories, Delicate Edible Birds, was released in January 2009. It featured stories published in The New Yorker, The Atlantic, Five Points, Ploughshares, and the anthologies Best New American Voices 2008, Pushcart Prize XXXII, and The Best American Short Stories 2007, 2010, and 2014 editions.

Groff's second novel, Arcadia, was released in 2012 and tells the story of the first child born in a fictional 1960s commune in upstate New York. A New York Times and Booksense bestseller, it received favorable reviews from the New York Times Sunday Book Review, The Washington Post, and Miami Herald. The novel was recognized as one of the Best Books of 2012 by The New York Times, The Washington Post, NPR, Vogue, The Globe and Mail, The Christian Science Monitor, and Kirkus Reviews.

Her third novel, Fates and Furies, was released in 2015 and was also a New York Times and Booksense bestseller. Fates and Furies is a portrait of a 24-year marriage from two points of view, first the husband's and then the wife's. It was nominated for the 2015 National Book Award for Fiction, the 2015 National Book Critics Circle Award for Fiction, and was featured in numerous "Best of 2015" fiction lists, including the selection by Amazon.com as the Best Book of 2015. President Barack Obama chose it as his favorite book of 2015.

In 2017, Granta named Groff one of the Best of Young American Novelists of her generation. In 2018, she received a Guggenheim Fellowship in Fiction.

Groff's fifth book, a short story collection titled Florida, was released in 2018. Florida was the winner of The Story Prize for short story collections published in 2018. It was also a finalist for the 2018 National Book Award for Fiction. The Guardian called Groff's storytelling "a heroic pushback against the way we live now, against waste, against the artificial environments in which we find ourselves maintained by corporations, but equally against the pressures on women to be flawless, effortlessly excellent mothers, wives, sisters, lovers, friends, within this dire state of affairs." Groff drew heavily on her experiences living in Florida when writing the collection, using the state's wildlife, weather, and landscape to explore themes of motherhood, family, aging, and the relationship between humans and nature. She has described Florida as both an important influence on her writing and a source of creative tension, referring to the state as a "creative nemesis."

Groff's fourth novel, Matrix, was released in 2021. Matrix is about a "seventeen-year-old Marie de France... sent to England to be the new prioress of an impoverished abbey, its nuns on the brink of starvation and beset by disease." The Observer called it "a strange and poetic piece of historical fiction set in a dreamlike abbey, the fictional biography of a 12th-century mystic." Matrix was shortlisted for the 2021 National Book Award for Fiction and the 2022 Andrew Carnegie Medal for Excellence in Fiction.

Groff's fifth novel, The Vaster Wilds, debuted on the New York Times Bestseller list in September 2023. The Vaster Wilds Groff's third collection of short fiction, Brawler, was released on February 24, 2026. chronicles a servant girl's escape from a colonial settlement during the "starving time" of 1609. Groff's third collection of short fiction, Brawler, was released on February 24, 2026.

In 2024, she opened a bookstore, The Lynx, in Gainesville, Florida. She was also guest editor of The Best American Short Stories 2024.

Lauren Groff and her husband, Clay Kallman founded The Lynx. They aimed to create a bookstore that defended access to literature while bringing writers and readers together. The bookstore established The Lynx Watch, Inc., a nonprofit that distributes challenged and banned books in Florida. According to reporting by The Independent Florida Alligator, the organization has distributed books to groups including the Pace Center for Girls and the Early Learning Coalition; a store manager said it gave away more than $20,000 worth of banned books in 2024. Groff has described her involvement with The Lynx as part of her broader commitment to protecting access to books and supporting literary communities. The bookstore features works by LGBTQ+ authors, Black and Indigenous writers, Florida authors, and other writers whose works have faced challenges or bans. It's part of Gainesville's independent-bookselling history; a literary community center in a university town; and deliberately founded in response to Florida's debate over book restrictions and access to literature.

== Personal life ==
Groff is married to Clayton Kallman and has two children and lives in Gainesville, Florida. Her sister is triathlete and two-time U.S. Olympian Sarah True.

In 2021, Groff came out as bisexual.

== Political views ==
Groff has been a vocal critic of Artificial intelligence. In September 2023, she wrote on X, "I would never have consented for Meta to train AI on any of my books, let alone five of them." In June 2025, Groff signed an open letter criticizing the usage of artificial intelligence in writing. Groff has also spoken publicly about the effects of climate change and the need for individual preparedness in response to increasingly severe weather events. Her environmental concerns have also influenced her fiction, particularly Florida, which examines relationships between humans, wildlife, and the state's environment.

Groff has characterized book bans as part of a broader pattern of restrictions on civil liberties, arguing that censorship can distract from other political issues, including reproductive rights, access to healthcare, education, and environmental resources. She has also expressed concern that literary censorship can contribute to the marginalization and erasure of underrepresented communities. Discussing her experience operating The Lynx, Groff described receiving messages from individuals who had left Florida because of its political climate toward transgender and gay people. She explained that the bookstore sought to provide a welcoming community space for readers who felt marginalized and to promote literature that reflects a wider range of identities and experiences.

In 2023, Groff expressed her support for Palestine.

== Bibliography ==
=== Novels ===
- The Monsters of Templeton (William Heinemann, 2008, ISBN 9780434017843)
- Arcadia (Hachette, 2012, ISBN 9781401340872)
- Fates and Furies (William Heinemann, 2015, ISBN 9781785150142)
- Matrix (William Heinemann, 2021, ISBN 9781785151903)
- The Vaster Wilds (Riverhead Books, 2023), ISBN 9780593418390.

=== Short fiction ===
- Delicate Edible Birds (Grand Central Publishing, 2009, ISBN 9781401340865)
- Florida (Riverhead Books, 2018, ISBN 9781594634512)
- Brawler (Riverhead Books, 2026, ISBN 9780593418420)
