= Susan Straight =

American writer (born 1960)

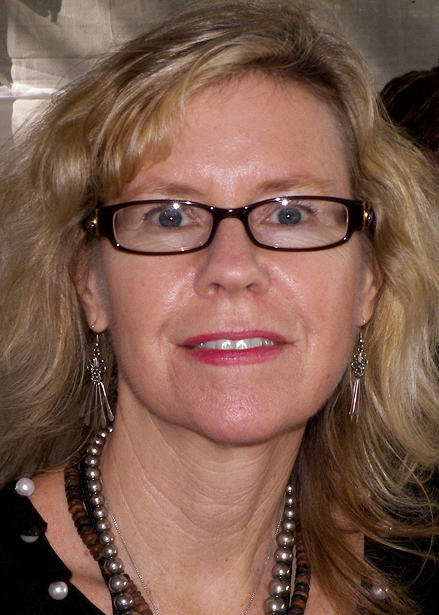
- Straight in 2010
- Born: October 19, 1960 (age 66); Riverside, California, U.S.
- Education: Riverside Community College; University of Southern California; University of Massachusetts Amherst (MFA)
- Occupation: Writer
- Years active: 1990–present
- Website: susanstraight.com

Susan Straight (born October 19, 1960) is an American writer. She was a National Book Award finalist for the novel Highwire Moon in 2001.

== Biography ==
Susan Straight attended John W. North High School in Riverside, California and took classes at Riverside Community College while in high school. She went on to earn a scholarship to the University of Southern California and, in 1984, earned her M.F.A. from the University of Massachusetts Amherst's MFA Program for Poets & Writers.

She co-founded the Master of Fine Arts in Creative Writing & Writing for the Performing Arts program at University of California, Riverside, where she is currently a Distinguished Professor of Creative Writing and the director of the graduate program.

Straight has published eight novels, a novel for young readers and a children's book. She has also written essays and articles for numerous national publications, including Granta, The New York Times, Los Angeles Times, The Nation and Harper's Magazine.

She is a frequent contributor to NPR and Salon. Her story "Mines", first published in Zoetrope: All-Story, was included in The Best American Short Stories 2003.

== Personal life ==
Straight lives in Riverside, California. She has three daughters.

== Awards and honors ==
Year	Title	Award	Category	Result	Ref
1990	Aquaboogie	Milkweed National Fiction Prize	—	Won	
2001	Highwire Moon	National Book Award	Fiction	Finalist	
2007	—	Lannan Literary Award	Fiction	Won	
2008	"The Golden Gopher"	Edgar Awards	Best Short Story	Won	
2013	—	Los Angeles Times Book Prize	Robert Kirsch Award		

== Bibliography ==
=== Novels ===
- —— (1991). Aquaboogie: A Novel in Stories. Minneapolis, Minn.: Milkweed Editions. ISBN 9780915943593.
- —— (1993). I Been in Sorrow's Kitchen and Licked Out All the Pots.
- —— (1995). Blacker Than a Thousand Midnights.
- —— (1997). The Gettin' Place.
- —— (2001). Highwire Moon.
- —— (2006). A Million Nightingales.
- —— (2010). Take One Candle Light a Room.
- —— (2012). Between Heaven and Here.
- —— (2022). Mecca.

=== Short fiction ===
Year	Title	First published	Reprinted/collected
????	Tulsa, 1921	????	Golden, Marita; Shreve, Susan Richards, eds. (1995). Skin deep : Black women & White women write about race. New York: Nan A. Talese. ISBN 9780385474092.
2003	"Mines"	Zoetrope: All-Story	
2005	"Poinciana"	The Cocaine Chronicles	
2007	"The Golden Gopher"	Los Angeles Noir	
2007	"El Ojo de Agua"	The O. Henry Prize Stories 2007	
2018	"The Princess of Valencia"	Amazon Original Stories	
2018	"The Perseids"	Granta	

=== For younger readers ===
- Bear E. Bear (1995)
- The Friskative Dog (2007)

=== Nonfiction ===
- In the Country of Women (2019)

=== Essays, reporting and other contributions ===
- Race: An Anthology in the First Person (essay, "Letter to My Daughters") (1997)
- Mothers Who Think: Tales of Real-Life Parenthood (essay, "One Drip at a Time") (1999)
- When Race Becomes Real: Black and White Writers Confront Their Personal Histories (essay, "Country Music") (2002)
- Life As We Know It: A Collection of Personal Essays from Salon.com (essay, "Love Me, Love My Guns") (2003)
- Dog Is My Co-Pilot: Great Writers on the World's Oldest Friendship (essay, "Brave and Noble Is the Preschool Dog") (2003)
- Some of My Best Friends: Writers on Interracial Friendships (essay, "Cartilage") (2004)
- Little Women (afterword) (2004)
- Because I Said So: 33 Mothers Write About Children, Sex, Men, Aging, Faith, Race, and Themselves (essay, "The Belly Unbuttoned") (2005)
- I Married My Mother-in-law And Other Tales of In-laws We Can't Live With - And Can't Live Without (essay, "A Family You Can't Divorce") (2006)
- Inlandia: A Literary Journey Through California's Inland Empire (introduction) (2006)
- Bad Girls: 26 Writers Misbehave (essay, "Reckless") (July 2007)
- The Show I'll Never Forget: 50 Writers Relive Their Most Memorable Concertgoing Experience (essay, "The Funk Festival at Los Angeles Coliseum, Los Angeles, May 26, 1979") (2007)
- Straight, Susan (Mar–Apr 2013). "November 24, 1963 : what my brother left behind". The Believer. 11 (3): 25–28.
