= Down by the River (novel) =

1997 novel by Edna O'Brien

- First edition (publ. Weidenfeld & Nicolson)
- Author: Edna O'Brien
- Language: English
- Publication date: 1997

Down by the River is a 1997 novel by Irish novelist Edna O'Brien. The novel depicts the response of a local community the a girl, Mary, abuse by her father being exposed to their local community when she tries to get an abortion. The ensuing legal battle in a country which bans abortions.

The novel was based on a real-life story from 1992, when a similar case ignited controversy in both Ireland and the UK. The novel highlights the psychological realities of such attention on the girl, as she struggles with her abuse.

== Reception ==
Reception of the novel was generally positive, focusing on O'Brien's prose and critique of Irish culture. Publishers Weekly described the novel as effective: "Taking Mary's point of view, and revealing the full horror and pathos of her heroine's plight only gradually, O'Brien creates a stark, unflinching story. But a simultaneous poetic sense also embues the narrative with beauty and grace."

The New York Times greatly praised the novel, describing the novel as a continuation of O'Brien's earlier efforts: "Earlier in her career, she wrote with a wit and ferocity that were enhanced by the sweetness and simplicity of her style. Her old weapons were sharp and effective; perhaps she comes too late to this particular fight."

Though Kirkus Reviews praised the novel as "one of the most ferocious indictments of Gaelic life and culture since The Playboy of the Western World," it describes the novel as not entirely satisfying, with a "propagandistic tone and two-dimensional characterizations."
