= Vocolot =

American all-female a cappella ensemble

- Origin: California, United States
- Genres: a cappella; Jewish; folk; world
- Years active: 1988–present
- Members: Linda Hirschhorn; Elizabeth Stuart; Talia Cooper; Shana Levy
- Website: www.vocolot.com

Vocolot is a contemporary Jewish women's a cappella ensemble based in California, USA.

== History ==
Vocolot began in 1988, when singer-songwriter Linda Hirschhorn informally assembled a group of musicians to record some of the songs she had written for four- and five-part vocal harmonies. When they had finished recording those, for the Gather Round album, she asked the singers to join her in an ongoing group. The founding members were Rosalind Glazer, Max Ventura, Tay Holden and Linda Hirschhorn.

Vocolot has gone through many incarnations as new members joined and prior members left to start families and pursue other careers. Besides the current members and the founders, there were Kirsten Zerger, Alisa Peres, Helen Cohen, Ellen Robinson, Gale Kissin, Judy Larson, Sharon Preves, Abbe Lyons, Naomi Hannah, Judith-Kate Friedman, Fran Avni, Jennifer Karno, Alison Lewis, Felicia Sloin, and Julia Bordenaro.

Although Vocolot performs mostly a cappella, in the early 1990s they began incorporating percussion into some of their songs, with Helen Cohen, Gale Kissin, Ellen Robinson and Liz Stuart on doumbek and frame drums, and their song, "These Hands", integrates body percussion.

They were the only American group to make it to the finals at the 2008 International Jewish Music Competition in Amsterdam.

== Musical style ==
The group performs original compositions and arrangements of traditional Jewish, folk, and world-music songs in English, Hebrew, Yiddish, Ladino, and Arabic. Mixing folk, classical, cantorial and Jazz idioms in a polyphonic style of intricately interwoven voices, the women perform a cappella blended with hand drums and Body percussion. The ensemble has been compared to the group Sweet Honey in the Rock.

Many of Vocolot's songs share themes of peace and justice, and Vocolot has sung at numerous rallies and fundraisers on behalf of women's empowerment organizations, MLK Day and Civil Rights events, El Salvador, Nicaragua, the homeless, women's shelters, Darfur, and at many anti-war demonstrations. In addition, they commonly perform at festivals, conferences and conventions, folk music clubs, Jewish community centers and federations, colleges and universities, churches and synagogues throughout the U.S.A.

== Name ==
The name 'Vocolot' (Hebrew pronunciation: [vokoˈlot]) is a bilingual pun on the English word 'vocal', and the Hebrew word קולות qolot [qoˈlot], meaning "voices". The name was chosen by the founding members in November 1988, at a time when the politically active group was encouraging electoral participation with the slogan "Get out the local vote with Vocolot!" at their performances.

== Personnel ==
=== Current members ===
As of 2017, the Vocolot lineup was:

- Linda Hirschhorn (director)
- Elizabeth Stuart
- Talia Cooper
- Shana Levy

=== Former members ===
- Rosalind Glazer (1988–1997)
- Max Ventura (1988–1991)
- Tay Holden (1988–1989)
- Kirsten Zerger (1989–1992)
- Alisa Peres (1989)
- Helen Cohen (1992)
- Ellen Robinson (1989–2005)
- Gale Kissin (1991–1992)
- Judy Larson (1990–1991)
- Sharon Preves (1991–1992)
- Abbe Lyons (1992–1995)
- Naomi Hannah (1992)
- Judith-Kate Friedman (1995–2003)
- Fran Avni (1996)
- Jennifer Karno (1997–2006)
- Alison Lewis (1998–2003)
- Felicia Sloin (2003–2005)
- Julia Bordenaro (2004-2010)

== Discography ==
Vocolot has produced five albums. Their work is distributed under the Oyster Albums label by Kehila Productions in Berkeley, California. Their songs are registered with BMI.

- Gather Round (1989)
- Roots & Wings (1992)
- Behold! (1998)
- Heart Beat (2002)
- Vocolot at 25 (2012)

== Awards ==
- International Jewish Music Festival 2008 Amsterdam Competition Finalist
- Harmony Sweepstakes Bay Area Regional 2nd-Place Winner
- Just Plain Folks 2006 Music Awards Nominee, for Behold!
- Just Plain Folks 2017 Music Awards Nominee, for Vocolot at 25
