= Time & Tide (2006 film) =

Tuvaluan 2006 documentary film

- Directed by: Julie Bayer; Josh Salzman
- Produced by: Julie Bayer; Josh Salzman
- Starring: Eric Chivian; Poni Faavae; Siaosi Finiki; Craig Frances
- Cinematography: Josh Salzman
- Edited by: Matthew Martin
- Music by: Andrew Mclean
- Production companies: Wavecrest Films; Nonfiction Unlimited
- Distributed by: Pacific Islanders in Communications
- Release date: 24 July 2006
- Running time: 59 minutes
- Country: Tuvalu
- Languages: English; Tuvaluan

Time & Tide is a 2006 documentary film from Tuvalu.

== Production ==
The creators, Julie Bayer and Josh Salzman, got the idea for Time & Tide in 2000 after reading about how the island nation of Tuvalu had sold the .tv domain name for US$50 million.

== Synopsis ==
The documentary sees a group of Tuvaluan New Zealanders on a journey back to the homeland. On arriving in Funafuti, they see how the country has been changed by economic development, imported goods, Western culture and the impending sea level rise due to global warming.

== Release ==
Time & Tide was premiered on 24 July 2006 at the New Zealand International Film Festival.

It won the Best Documentary Prize at the Big Muddy Film Festival and a Special Jury Prize at the Sidewalk Film Festival; it also screened at the Hawaii International Film Festival, winning The Golden Orchid Award for Best Documentary at that festival.

Film Threat said that "Time & Tide doesn’t overstay its welcome, nor does it feel rushed as it presents us this tragic, yet peaceful and gorgeously shot, film that never jumps up on the soapbox to violently jam a message down our throats. Instead, the filmmakers let the message speak for itself and it’s in the quiet concern of the Tuvaluan people."

== See also ==
- Climate change in Tuvalu
