= Arcadia (novel) =

2012 novel by Lauren Groff

- First edition
- Author: Lauren Groff
- Language: English
- Set in: Upstate New York
- Published: March 13, 2012
- Publisher: Hachette
- Publication place: USA
- Pages: 291
- ISBN: 9781401340872

Arcadia is the second novel by Lauren Groff, published in 2012 by Hachette. It is set in Upstate New York during the 1960s and 70s, and depicts a utopian commune through the eyes of the settlement's first-born child, Bit. The commune is situated on the grounds of an old and crumbling homestead. The book travels forward through Bit's life after the commune and eventually depicts a post-apocalyptic future ravaged by global warming. The novel received high praise from The New York Times, The Kenyon Review, NPR, and Guernica.
