= The Light of Evening =

2006 novel by Edna O'Brien

- First edition cover
- Author: Edna O'Brien
- Publisher: Houghton Mifflin
- Publication date: October 4, 2006
- ISBN: 978-0-297-85133-2

The Light of the Evening is a 2006 novel by Irish novelist Edna O'Brien. The novel explores the relationship between one of O'Brien's archetypal defeated rural women, who on her deathbed is trying to repair her relationship with her daughter, a writer.

== Reception ==
Reception of the novel was mixed. Anne Enright doesn't make a firm conclusion about the novel, but praises two features in her review for The Guardian: O'Brien's continued interest in the downtrodden, and a depiction of life that she calls "remarkable [for its] honesty". Publishers Weekly was more positive about the novel, noting that it "evokes the cruelty of estrangement while allowing her characters to remain sympathetic and giving them real voice."

Slate reviewer Claire Dederer described the novel as challenging to start reading, but epitomizes O'Brien's focus on "the poetic and the sensational", while at times the "lyricism" and "sentamentalism" "get away from her". Dederer concludes that the novel does two things: it "stands apart, refusing to give mere comfort."
