= Wild Decembers (novel) =

Book by Edna O'Brien

First edition (publ. Weidenfeld & Nicolson)

Wild Decembers is a novel by Edna O'Brien. It is set in western Ireland in the 1970s, and was later made into a TV series.
