= Girl with Green Eyes =

1964 British film by Desmond Davis

- Theatrical release poster
- Directed by: Desmond Davis
- Screenplay by: Edna O'Brien
- Based on: The Lonely Girl; 1962 novel by Edna O'Brien
- Produced by: Oscar Lewenstein
- Starring: Peter Finch; Rita Tushingham; Lynn Redgrave; Marie Kean; Arthur O'Sullivan; Julian Glover
- Cinematography: Manny Wynn
- Edited by: Brian Smedley-Aston
- Music by: John Addison
- Production company: Woodfall Film Productions
- Distributed by: United Artists
- Release date: 14 May 1964
- Running time: 91 minutes
- Country: United Kingdom
- Language: English
- Budget: £140,000

Girl with Green Eyes is a 1964 British romantic drama film directed by Desmond Davis and starring Peter Finch, Rita Tushingham, Lynn Redgrave and Julian Glover. Adapted by Edna O'Brien from her novel The Lonely Girl, the film tells the story of a young, naive country girl's romance with a sophisticated older man. As the film is in black and white, the green eyes are never seen. The film studies the blossoming relationship between a young girl and a man twice her age.

== Plot ==
Kate Brady, a young girl just out of convent school, moves from her family home in the rural Irish countryside to Dublin, where she works in a grocery shop and rooms with her friend and schoolmate, Baba Brennan. The girls go dancing at clubs and date young men they meet, but the down-to-earth Baba is more socially adept than shy, romantic Kate. On a ride to the countryside with one of Baba's boyfriends, the girls meet Eugene Gaillard, a sophisticated middle-aged author.

Kate is attracted to him, and when she happens to see him again in a Dublin bookshop, uncharacteristically approaches him and strikes up a conversation. A friendship, and later a romantic relationship, develops between Kate and Eugene despite their age difference. Although clearly in love, and happy to join him in bed, she is unable to have sex. The repeated inability to have sex with Eugene starts to take its toll. The relationship worsens on her discovery that he is married with a child, although separated from his wife who has gone to the United States to obtain a divorce.

When Kate's father learns that his daughter is seeing a married man and thus apparently committing adultery, he and his friends go to Dublin and force Kate to return to his rural home. She sneaks out on the first morning but is waylaid by a cowhand. Later when the priest begins to lecture her she runs off. She returns to Eugene. Kate's father and his friends appear unexpectedly and punch Eugene in the face, but are driven off by his no-nonsense housekeeper Josie, who fires a shotgun at the ceiling and threatens them with the second barrel, forcing them to leave. Kate and Eugene then finally succeed in consummating their relationship.

He buys her a ring and Kate treats it as a wedding ring. She starts wearing make-up and wearing her hair up, looking much more sophisticated. She tells a stranger "I got married today". They live together for a time.

Eventually, Kate becomes unhappy as Eugene does not share her Catholic beliefs, his friends do not regard Kate seriously, and he continues to correspond with his estranged wife, for whom he still has some feelings. When Eugene's wife sends a plane ticket Kate gives him an ultimatum to choose but he does not react as she wishes and it is the beginning of the end.

Kate leaves Eugene and returns to Baba, who is packing to move to London. She invites Kate to come along with her. Kate hopes that Eugene will come after her and she looks expectantly at the people on the dock edge as they sail off. He does not appear. Instead he sends word through Baba that their break-up is probably for the best. He wishes he had been younger or she had been more mature. Kate narrates explaining that she has changed and that she goes to night school. She meets "different people, different men".

== Cast ==
- Rita Tushingham as Kate Brady
- Lynn Redgrave as Baba Brennan
- Peter Finch as Eugene Gaillard
- Marie Kean as Josie Hannigan
- Arthur O'Sullivan as James Brady
- Julian Glover as Malachi Sullivan
- T. P. McKenna as Father Brown the priest
- Lislott Goettinger as Joanna
- Pat Laffan as Bertie Counihan
- Eileen Crowe as Mrs. Byrne
- May Craig as Aunt
- Joe Lynch as Andy Devlin
- Yolande Turner as Mary Maguire
- Harry Brogan as Jack Holland
- Michael Hennessey as Davey
- Joe O'Donnell as Patrick Devlin
- Micheal O'Briain as Lodger
- David Kelly as Ticket Collector

== Critical reception ==
In his 1964 review in The New York Times, critic Bosley Crowther compliments the film's overall structure and tone, especially with regard to the leading actors' simply presented but evocative portrayals of emotion:

Girl with Green Eyes is another of those remarkably fresh and natural films that have come from the Woodfall organisation, which is sparked by protean Tony Richardson and which has given us such a dazzling range of pictures as A Taste of Honey, Loneliness of the Long Distance Runner and Tom Jones. While it is not as ambitious or extensive as any of those, it is a wonderfully tender, touching and humorous little drama of a lonely Irish girl.

Similarly, in its contemporary assessment of the film, the American trade publication Variety describes it as having "the smell of success" and characterises Desmond Davis as a director who "is imaginative, prepared to take chances and has the sympathy to draw perceptive performances from his cast".

On the review aggregator website Rotten Tomatoes, 83% of 6 critics' reviews are positive, with an average rating of 7/10.
