= Time and Tide (novel) =

Novel by Edna O'Brien

- First edition (US)
- Author: Edna O'Brien
- Language: English
- Publication date: 1992

Time and Tide is a 1992 novel by Irish novelist Edna O'Brien, published by Viking in the UK and by Farrar, Straus, and Giroux in the US. The novel depicts the hardship of Nell, an Irish beauty, during her challenging life in England. The New York Times described the plot as "disturbing", and focus heavily on the mourning created by Nell's misfortune.

The novel is a series of vignettes, self-contained stories, which the New York Times describes as "linked stories" rather than a full novel. The last 60 pages were published in The New Yorker under the title of the "Wilderness".

== Reception ==
Reception of the novel was mixed, with all of the reviewers focusing on the novel's gloomy depiction of the struggles of a downtrodden woman. The Independent described the novel as tedious and boring, writing "Indeed it is by adhering to just such nonsensical notions of the literary project that Time And Tide ends up being the tedious, soppy, overblown novel it is."

Other reviewers were more positive regarding O'Brien's continuation of her style. The New York Times Review of Books did not clearly create a verdict about the novel, focusing on how its disturbing and continues many of the themes and topics found in O'Brien's other work. The LA Times had more praise, writing that the novel profiles how "O'Brien's melodious, fluent prose is one of the sweetest pleasures of contemporary fiction." And though describing the novel as one that requires readers to "occasionally wants to call timeout", generally Robert Roper appreciates the novel's characterization of a woman who "invites her own destruction, even welcomes it."
