= The Country Girls =

Trilogy of novels by Irish author Edna O'Brien

- First edition cover, showing Baba (left) and Cait (right)
- Author: Edna O'Brien
- Language: English
- Series: Country Girls trilogy
- Genre: Bildungsroman, feminist literature
- Set in: Western Ireland and Dublin, late 1950s
- Published: 1960 Hutchinson
- Publication place: London
- Media type: Hardcover 8vo
- Pages: 223
- ISBN: 0752881167
- OCLC: 3365816
- Dewey Decimal: 823.914
- LC Class: A439530
- Followed by: The Lonely Girl

The Country Girls is a trilogy by Irish author Edna O'Brien. It consists of three novels: The Country Girls (1960), The Lonely Girl (1962), and Girls in Their Married Bliss (1964). The trilogy was re-released in 1986 in a single volume with a revised ending to Girls in Their Married Bliss and addition of an epilogue. The Country Girls, both the trilogy and the novel, is often credited with breaking silence on sexual matters and social issues during a repressive period in Ireland following World War II and was adapted into a 1983 film. All three novels were banned by the Irish censorship board and faced significant public disdain in Ireland.

== The Country Girls (1960) ==
=== Plot synopsis ===
Caithleen "Cait/Kate" Brady and Bridget "Baba" Brennan are two young Irish country girls who have spent their childhood together. As they leave the safety of their convent school in search of life and love in the big city, they struggle to maintain their somewhat tumultuous relationship. Cait, dreamy and romantic, yearns for true love, while Baba just wants to experience the life of a single girl. Although they set out to conquer the world together, as their lives take unexpected turns, Cait and Baba must ultimately learn to find their own way.

=== 1983 film adaptation ===
The novel was filmed in 1983 directed by Desmond Davis. It had a budget of £770,000.

== The Lonely Girl (1962) ==
In the Lonely Girl, Caithleen (Cait/Kate) and Bridget (Baba) move to Dublin. The novel tells the story of Kate's romance with a sophisticated older man. Eventually, Kate becomes unhappy as Eugene does not share her Catholic religious beliefs, his friends do not regard Kate seriously, and he continues to correspond with his estranged wife, for whom he still has some feelings. Kate finally leaves Eugene and returns to Baba, who is packing to move to London and invites Kate to come along. Kate hopes that Eugene will come after her and ask her to return to him, but instead he sends word through Baba that their breakup is probably for the best. Sadly, Kate departs for London with Baba, where she gets over her heartbreak and meets "different people, different men".

Girl with Green Eyes is a 1964 British drama film, starring Rita Tushingham and Lynn Redgrave, that Edna O'Brien adapted from her own novel The Lonely Girl.

== Girls in Their Married Bliss (1964) ==
The third and final book of the trilogy, Girls in Their Married Bliss, begins in London several years after the end of The Lonely Girl. It marks a significant shift in style from the first two books, as it is now narrated in part by Baba in the first person, while Kate's sections are narrated in the third person.

== Reception ==
The Irish censorship board banned The Country Girls upon its publication, adding it to a list of over 1,600 books banned in Ireland under the Censorship of Publications Act, 1929.

The public response in Ireland was largely negative as a result of the sparse sexual imagery and national critique throughout the trilogy. Religious and political figures took particular offence. Archbishop McQuaid and then Minister for Justice, Charlie Haughey decided that "the book was filth and should not be allowed inside any decent home." The trilogy was reportedly subject to public book burnings, although doubt has been expressed as to whether such a burning took place in O'Brien's hometown, as she herself alleged.

The Irish response to the trilogy, and the trilogy's international success despite this reaction, are frequently cited as key moments in the history of female writers in Ireland. According to Irish novelist Anne Enright, "O'Brien is the great, the only, survivor of forces that silenced and destroyed who knows how many other Irish women writers, and her contradictions – her evasions even – must be regarded as salutary."

Writing in The Observer in 1960, Kingsley Amis said that The Country Girls deserved his "personal first-novel prize of the year". This comment was frequently interpreted as referring to a formal "Kingsley Amis Award", including by O'Brien's publishers, but no such literary prize exists. On 5 November 2019, BBC News included The Country Girls on its list of the 100 most influential novels.

== Analysis ==
The novel is an exploration of the trials and tribulations of two friends set against the backdrop of 1950s Ireland, showing the influence of James Joyce in the humane attention to detail and thought and the rather lyrical prose of the narrator Cait.

The ending, wherein Cait is deceived by Mr Gentleman, can be considered as a call by O'Brien for a reconsideration of Catholic values in Irish society. O'Brien helped to launch a new generation of Irish writers more focused on the demands and values of society, such as Enright, Nuala O'Faolain and Colm Tóibín.
