= St Paul's Studios =

Terrace of houses in London, England

- Two of the houses in the terrace, their large arched windows visible
- Interactive map of the St Paul's Studios area

General information
- Type: Residential
- Location: London, England
- Coordinates: 51°29′26″N 0°12′50″W
- Completed: 1891

Design and construction
- Architect: Frederick Wheeler

Listed Building – Grade II
- Official name: 135-149, TALGARTH ROAD W6
- Designated: 12 May 1970
- Reference no.: 1079780

St. Paul's Studios is a terrace of houses on the south side of Talgarth Road in the West Kensington area of London. The buildings are Grade II listed.

== History ==
The buildings were designed Frederick Wheeler for "bachelor artists", with first floor studios including large arched windows for inspiration.

Notable residents have included:

- Ruby Levick (sculptor)
- William Logsdale (painter)
- Henry Macbeth-Raeburn (painter)
- William Henry Margetson (painter)
- Sisters Gertrude Demain Hammond (illustrator) and Chris Hammond (illustrator)
- Otto Scholderer (painter)
- Hal Hurst (painter)
- E. T. Reed (illustrator)
- Margot Fonteyn (ballerina)
- Ernest Gébler (writer)
- Lancelot Speed (illustrator)
- George Kruger Gray (designer)

In the 1950s a number of the houses were converted into office space, No. 5 was used for some time as a dance school of the "Margaret Morris Movement", being reconverted for residential use in the 1980s.

The houses are described and feature in The Silkworm, a 2014 crime novel by J. K. Rowling.

== Design ==
They are designed in an Arts & Crafts style with elements of Jacobean inspiration. They feature prominent arched windows, some described by Giles Walkley as "still blackened since the Blitz".

The neighbouring 151 Talgarth Road, while not part of the development is often referred to as 9 St Paul's Studios.
