= Gébler =

Gébler is a surname. Notable people with the surname include:

- Carlo Gébler (born 1954), Irish writer, television director, and teacher
- Ernest Gébler (1914–1998), Irish writer
