= Chris Hammond (illustrator) =

English painter and illustrator (1860–1900)

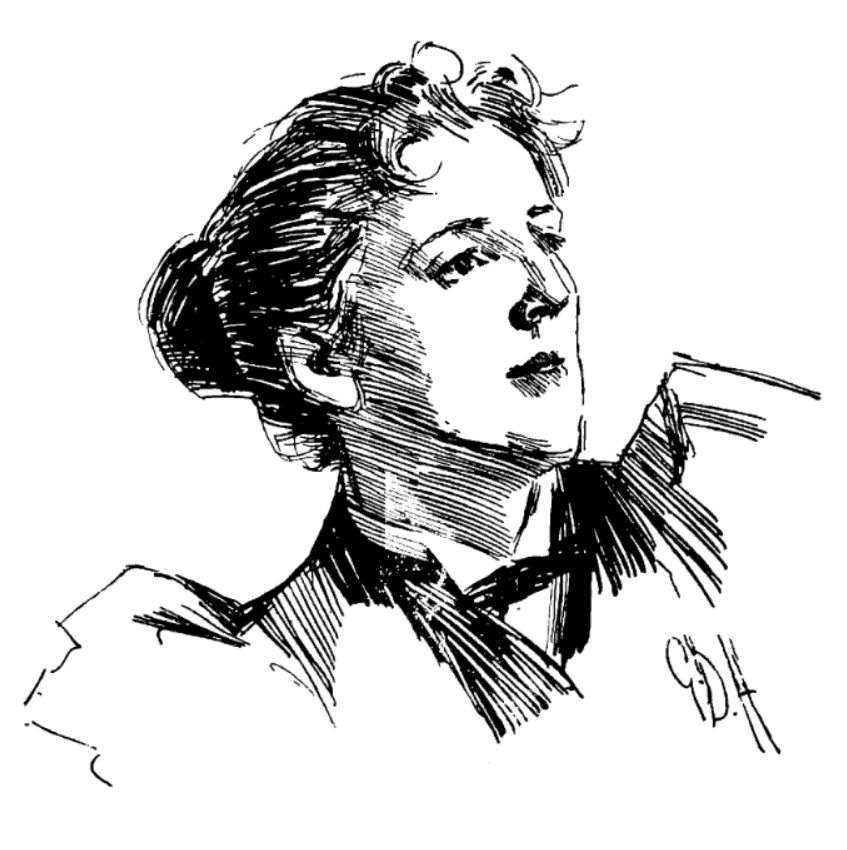
- Born: Christiana Mary Demain Hammond; 6 August 1860; Camberwell, London, England
- Died: 11 May 1900 (aged 39); 2 St. Paul's Studio, Talgath Road, West Kensington, London, England
- Other name: Chris Hammond
- Occupations: Artist and illustrator
- Years active: 1886–1900
- Known for: Illustrating the works of Jane Austen, Maria Edgeworth, and other classics

Christiana Mary Demain Hammond (6 August 1860 – 11 May 1900), known as Chris Hammond, was an English painter and illustrator. She was a member of the Cranford School of illustration, and illustrated reissues of classic English texts from the 19th century. Her illustrations were frequently found in Cassell's Magazine, The Quiver, and St. Paul's. She exhibited occasionally at the Royal Academy and Royal Institute of Painters in Watercolours. (Note: Hammond exhibited as follows: six works at the Royal Academy, two works at the Royal Society of British Artists, two works at the Royal Institute of Painters in Water Colours, and one work at the Royal Institute of Oil Painters.)

== Early life ==
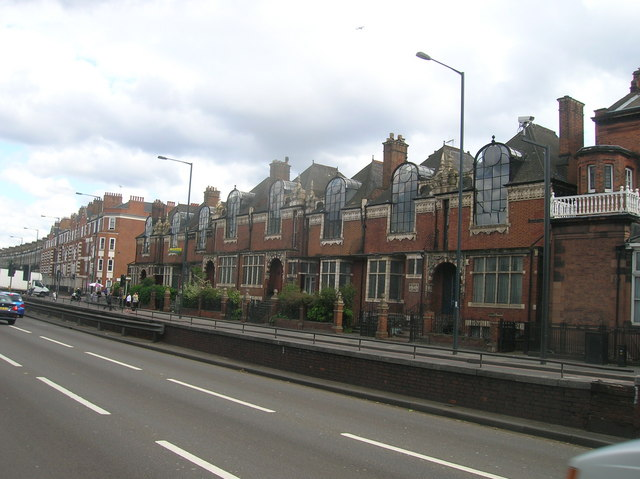
St Paul's Studios, where Hammond lived with her sister

Christiana Mary Demain Hammond was born in Coldharbour Lane, Brixton, London on 6 August 1860," and baptised on 16 September 1860. She was not named on her birth registration, but simply registered as a female child. Her parents were Horatio Demain Hammond, a bank clerk, and Eliza Mary Hammond (née Wood); they married in St. George's, Bloomsbury, London on 5 May 1858.

The couple had three children, all of whom were artists:

- Christiana Mary Demain (1860 – 11 May 1900); the only sibling who never married.
- Gertrude Ellen Demain RI (baptised 6 July 1862 – 21 July 1951). Gertrude and Christiana trained together, first at the Lambeth School of Art and then at the Royal Academy Schools. She was a painter and illustrator like Hammond. Gertrude was a prolific illustrator of books, including children's books and the retelling of historical stories. Gertrude married Henry Going McMurdie (c. 1860 – 28 November 1948) in Fulham, London on 14 June 1898 and the couple lived with Hammond at 2 St. Paul's Studios, in what is now Talgath Road, Kensington. (Note: This was part of a terrace of eight house designed by Frederick Wheeler FRIBA (1853–1931) as artists' studios, with a large lantern light on front of the house on the second floor. The studios were used as the settings for a murder in J. K. Rowling's The Silkworm, and featured in the BBC adaptation of the novel. One of the eight studios was listed for sale for £2,000,000 in 2018)
- Percy Edward Demain (6 December 1865 – 3 April 1946) described himself as a stained-glass artist in the 1901 census and as a decorative artist in 1911 and 1939. In 1906 he was working as an artist for Crittall Manufacturing Company, famous for their involvement in the Art-Deco movement, both as suppliers of steel windows used in art deco buildings, and for commissioning buildings in the art deco style. He was described as a Poster Artist in 1907, suggesting that he was involved in advertising for Crittall. Percy married Martha Cantwell in Lambeth in 1904. The couple had at least one son, Seymour Edward Demain (baptised 7 July 1905 – 15 October 1948).

=== Education ===
Hammond received her first training in drawing from her Governess, and then attended the Lambeth School of Art with her sister Gertrude in 1879. At the Lambeth School, Hammond won the Cressy for the best sketch on a particular subject, a competition open to all the students at the school, with the award made by Sir Lawrence Alma-Tadema.

Hammond and her sister both won scholarships for three years tuition at the Royal Academy Schools, where they began in 1889. Here, Hammond distinguished herself by passing through the various schools almost as rapidly as was possible. However, she was not eligible for a second three year scholarship as, although she had passed all her exams, she had missed many lectures due to illness, and a good attendance record was a requirement for a further scholarship. Thus her artistic education ended three years earlier than she would have liked. It was this foreshortening of her education that led her to concentrate on pen and ink work rather than oil painting.

== Works ==
Hammond painted, and exhibited at the Royal Academy in 1886, 1891, 1892, 1893, and 1894, and at the Royal Society of Painters in Watercolours in 1886 and 1895. While still a student at the Royal Academy Schools she came to the attention of James Barr, editor of the Detroit Free Press and Henry Reichardt, art-editor of Pick-Me-Up, both of whom gave her commissions. Hammond also contributed to the first issue of Reichardt's new illustrated weekly St. Paul's in 1884. After this first appearance of her work in St. Paul's she was approached not only by publishers such as Macmillan and Allen, but also by Sir William Ingram, the proprietor of both the Illustrated London News and The Sketch. From then on she was turning away work, as she was offered more commissions than she could complete.

She was also published in Cassell's Magazine, The Quiver, The English Illustrated Magazine, (Note: The English Illustrated Magazine continued to use her illustrations after her death, the last appearing in December 1912. The final issue of the magazine was in August 1913.) The Queen, Pall Mall Magazine, Pearson’s Magazine, The Idler, Madame, Good Words, The Ludgate Monthly, and The Temple Magazine

Hammond is regarded as a member of the Cranford School along with the C. E. Brock, H. M. Brock, Fred Pegram, F. H. Townsend and the inaugurator Hugh Thomson. The school was strictly speaking a shared style, as the individual artists had no particular relationship with each other. It was a style which celebrated a sentimental, pre-industrial notion of ‘old England’.

=== Books illustrated by Hammond ===
The following list is based on the list presented in the Argosy obituary. Most of the Hammond's work were for posthumous editions. However, in three cases she illustrated first editions.

List of books illustrated by Hammond
Serial	Year	Author	Title	Publisher	Edition
1	1895	Maria Edgeworth	Castle Rackrent	London: Macmillan	Posthumous
2	1895	Maria Edgeworth	The Absentee	London: Macmillan	Posthumous
3	1895	Maria Edgeworth	Popular Tales	London: Macmillan	Posthumous
4	1895	Jean-François Marmontel	Moral Tales	London: George Allen	Posthumous
5	1895	Samuel Richardson	Sir Charles Grandison	London: George Allen	Posthumous
6	1896	Maria Edgeworth	Helen	London: Macmillan	Posthumous
7	1896	Maria Edgeworth	Belinda	London:Macmillan	Posthumous
8	1896	Oliver Goldsmith	Comedies	London: George Allen	Posthumous
9	1897	Maria Edgeworth	The Parent's Assistant	London: Macmillan	Posthumous
10	1897	William Makepeace Thackeray	The History of Henry Esmond	London: Service & Paton	Posthumous
11	1897	William Makepeace Thackeray	Pendennis	London: Service & Paton	Posthumous
12	1897	R. D. Blackmore	Dariel	London: Blackwood	First Edition
13	1898	William Makepeace Thackeray	Vanity Fair	London: Service & Paton	Posthumous
14	1898	William Makepeace Thackeray	The Newcomes	London: Service & Paton	Posthumous
15	1898	Robert Bulwer-Lytton	The Caxtons	London: Service & Paton	Posthumous
16	1898	Jane Austen	Emma	London: George Allen	Posthumous
17	1898	Mary Catherine Rowsell	The Boys of Fairmead	London: Warne	First Edition
18	1899	Jane Austen	Sense and Sensibility	London: George Allen	Posthumous
19	1899	Mrs. Craik	John Halifax, Gentleman	London: E. Nisbet	Posthumous
20	1899	Oliver Vernon Caine	In the Year of Waterloo	London: E. Nisbet	First Edition
21	1899	Maria Edgeworth	Lazy Laurence, and Other Stories	London: Macmillan	Posthumous
22	1899	Mrs. Gaskell	Cranford	Glasgow: Gresham Publishing Co.	Posthumous
23	1899	Mrs. Gaskell	Mary Barton	Glasgow: Gresham Publishing Co.	Posthumous
24	1899	Jane Austen	Pride and Prejudice	Glasgow: Gresham Publishing Co.	Posthumous

=== Example of illustrations by Hammond ===
Illustration by Hammond for the 1898 Service & Patton reissue of Vanity Fair by Thackeray.

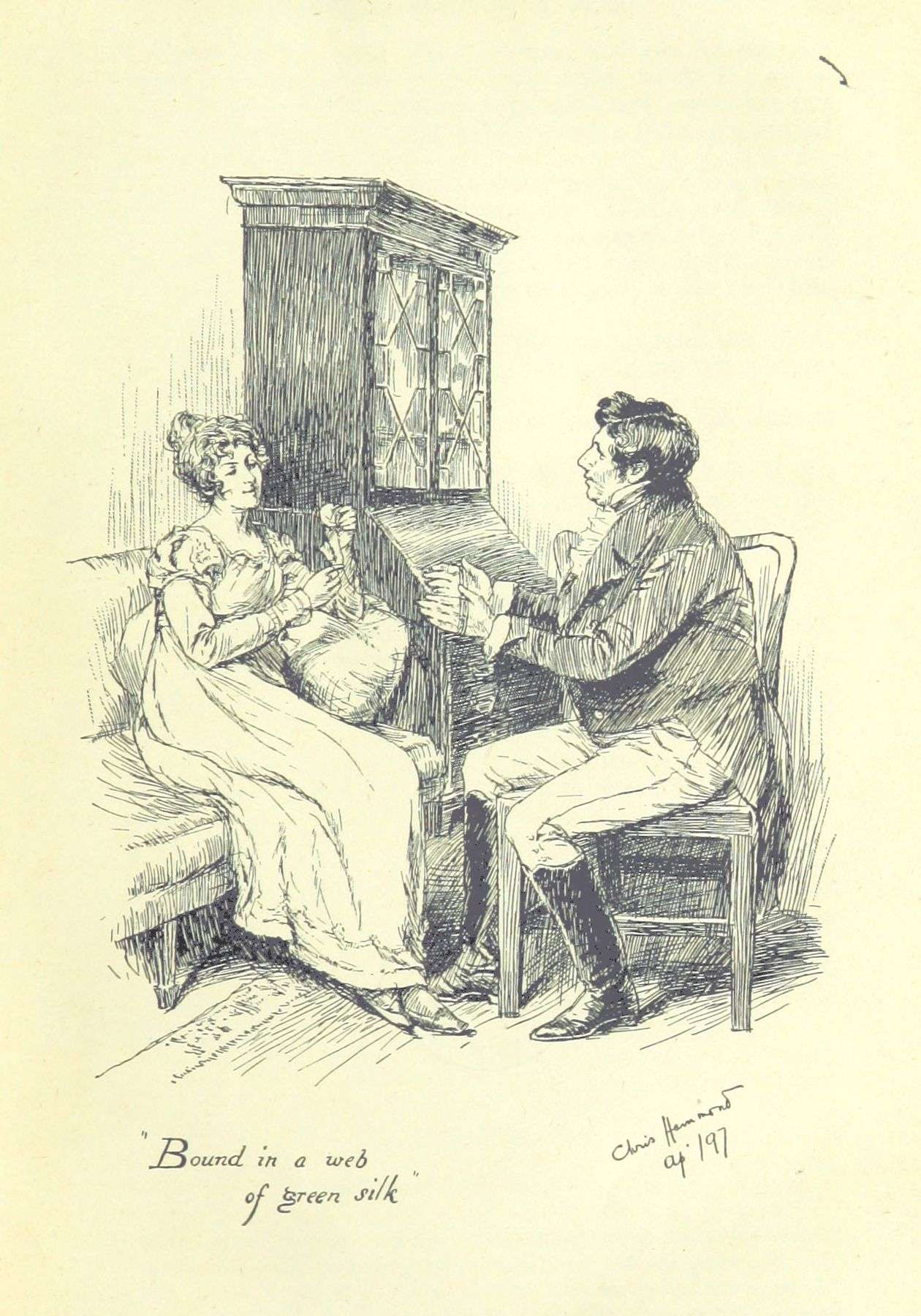
Page 029

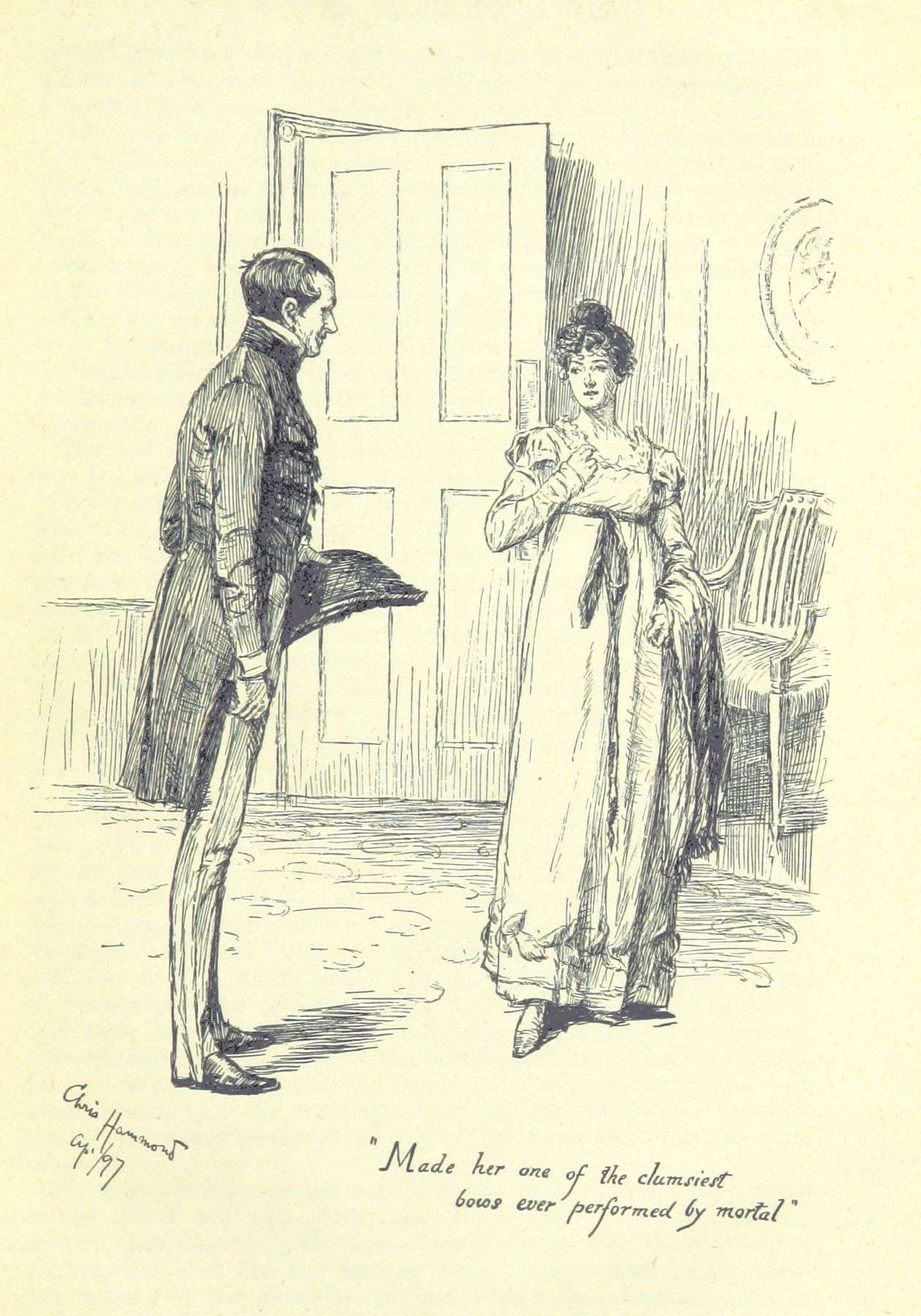
Page 037

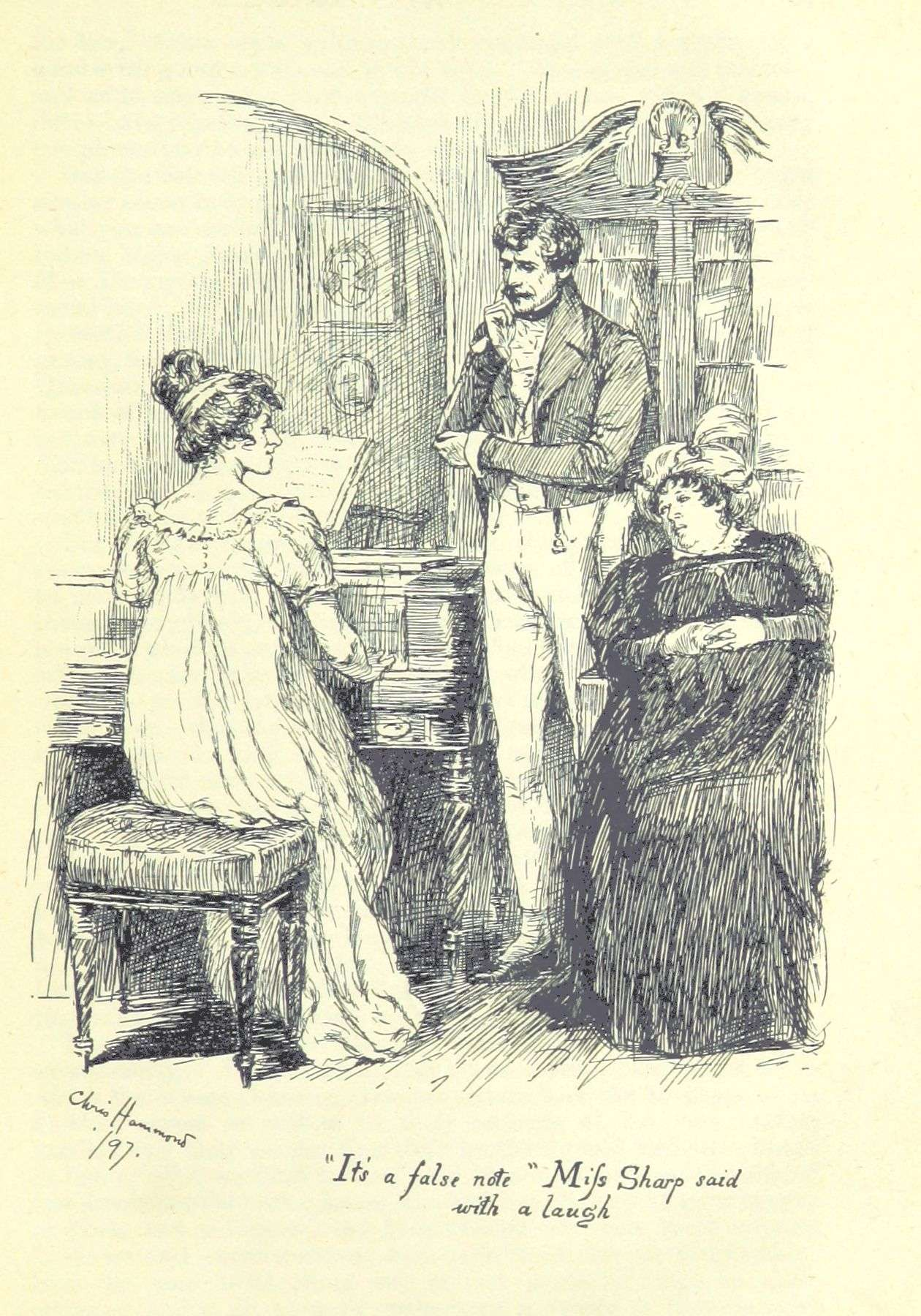
Page 082

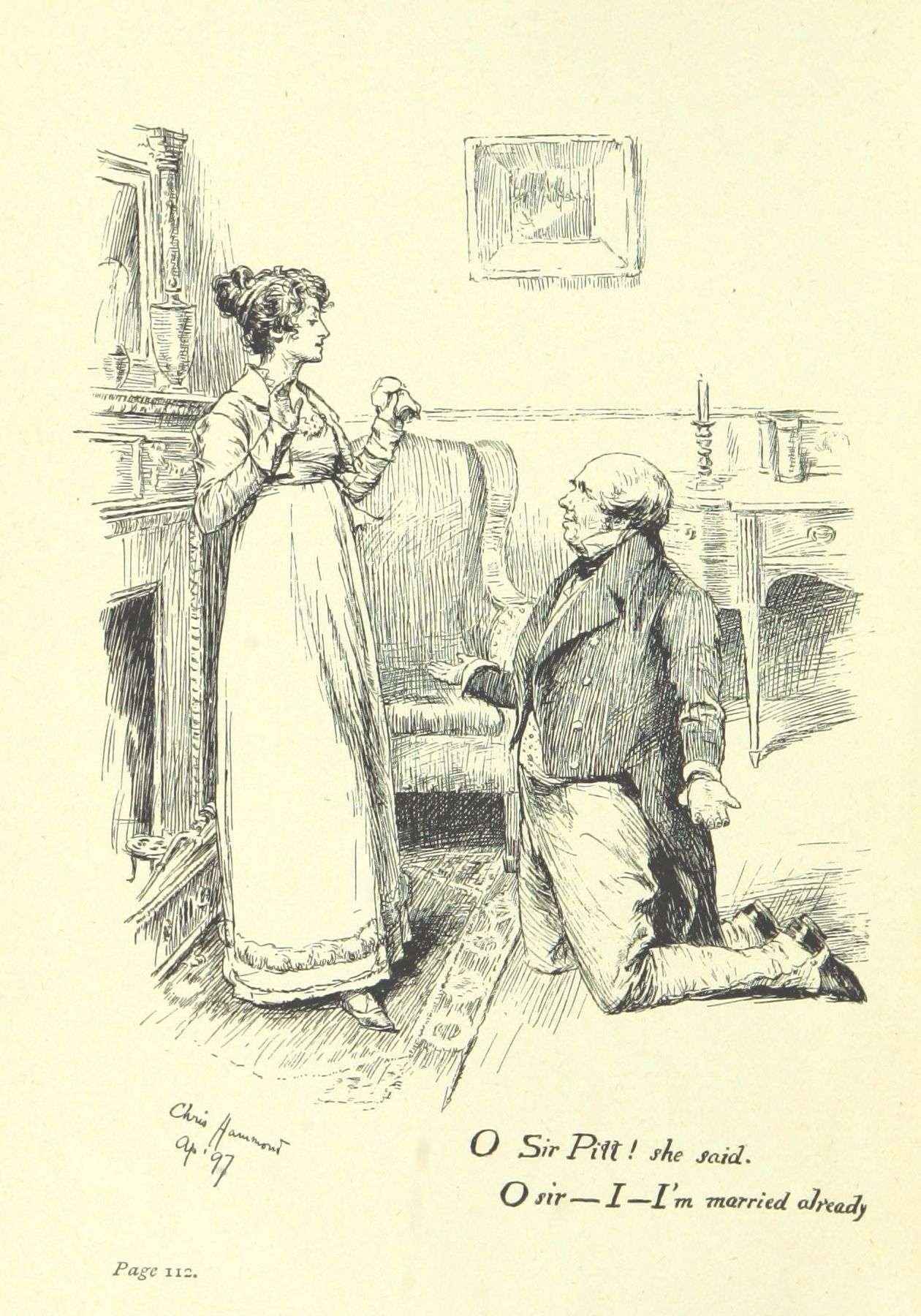
Page 112

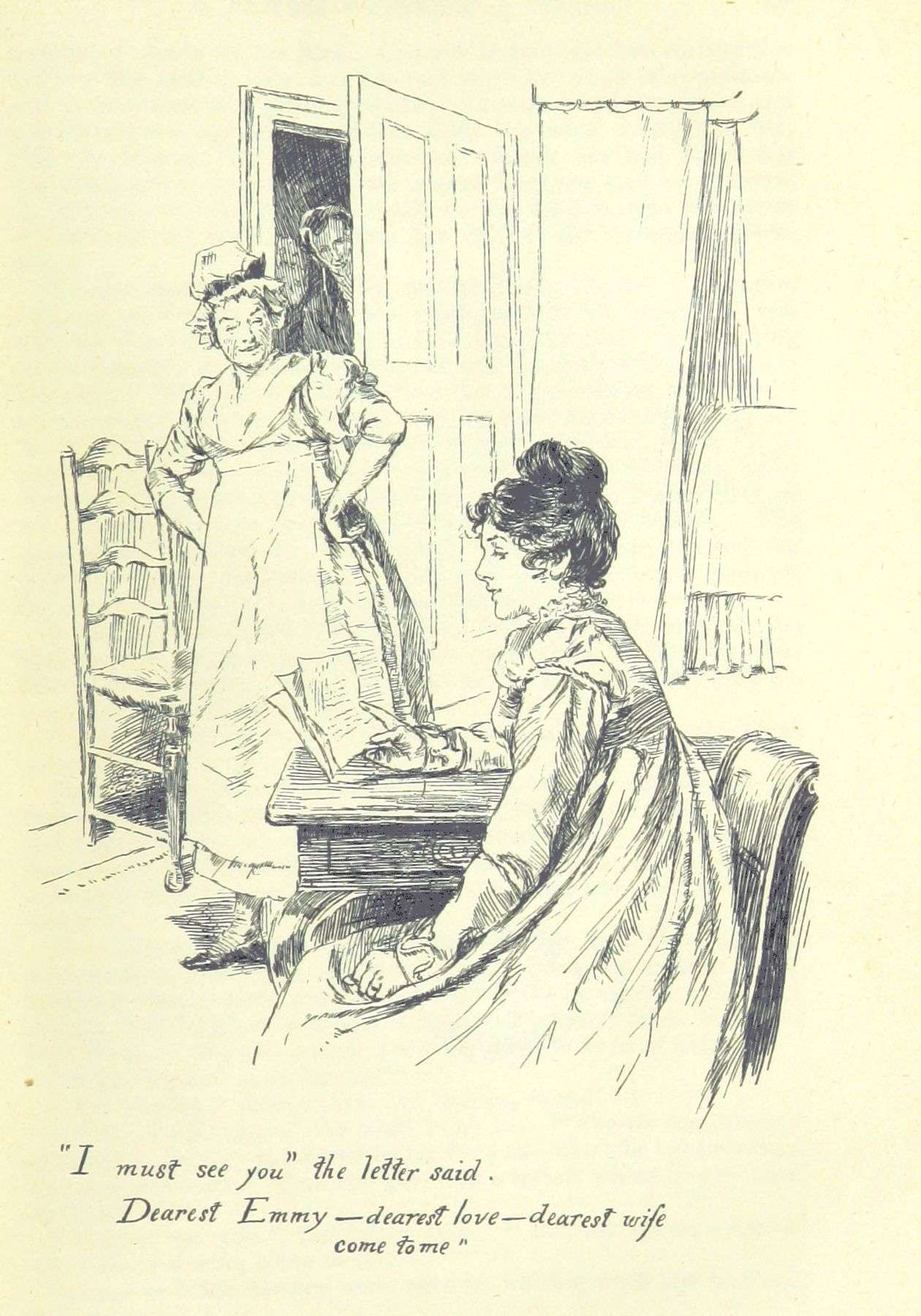
Page 141

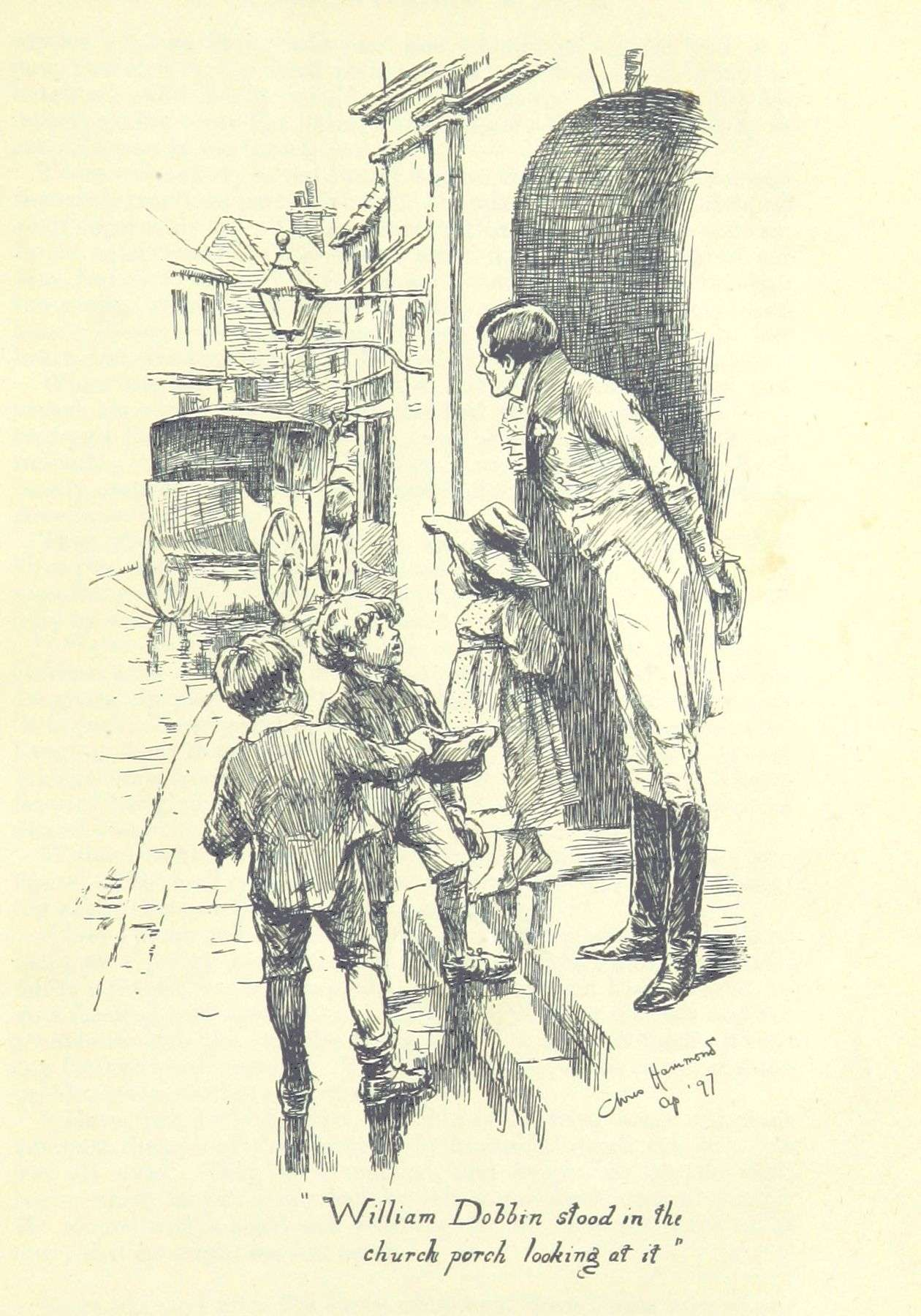
Page 167

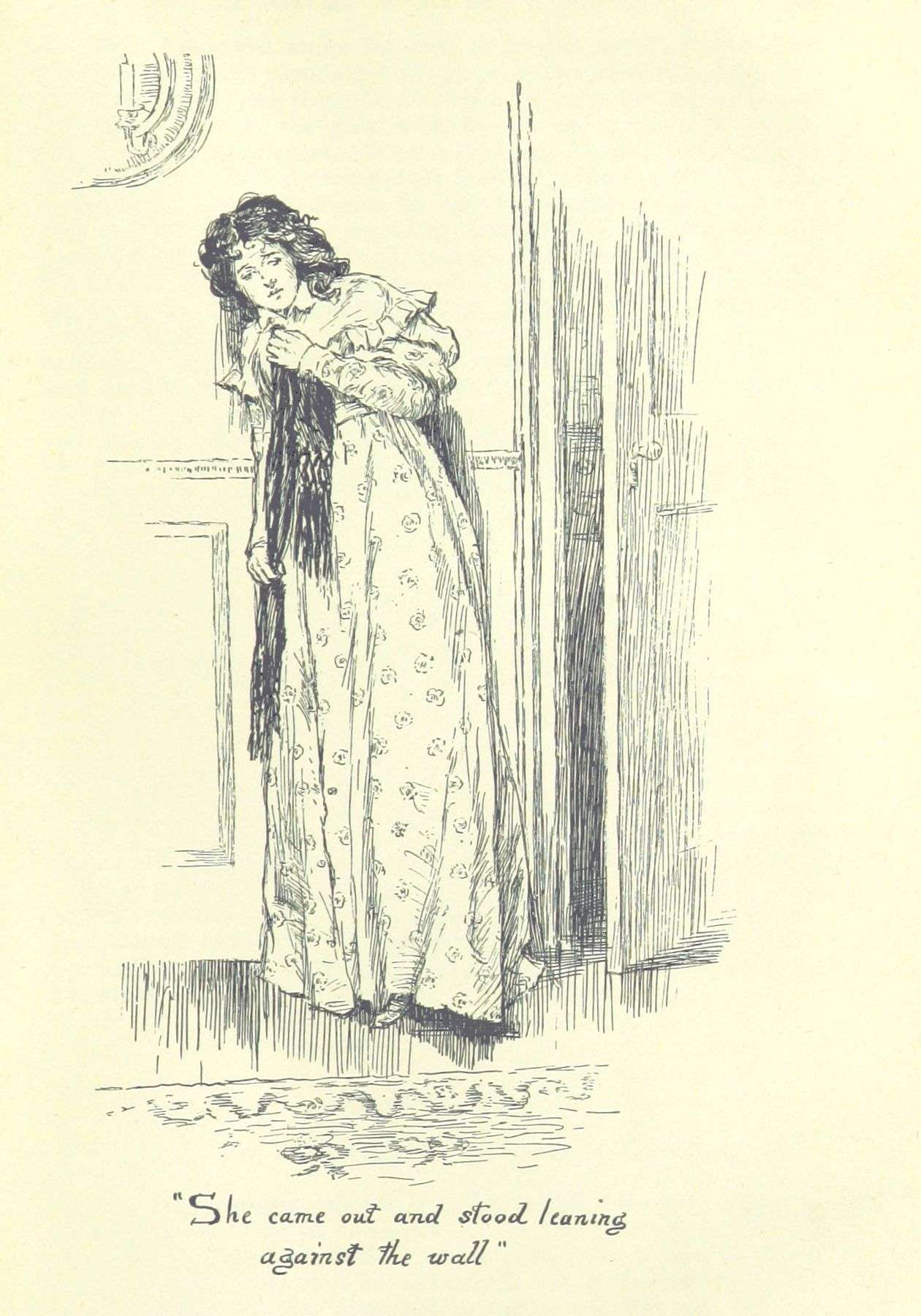
Page 236

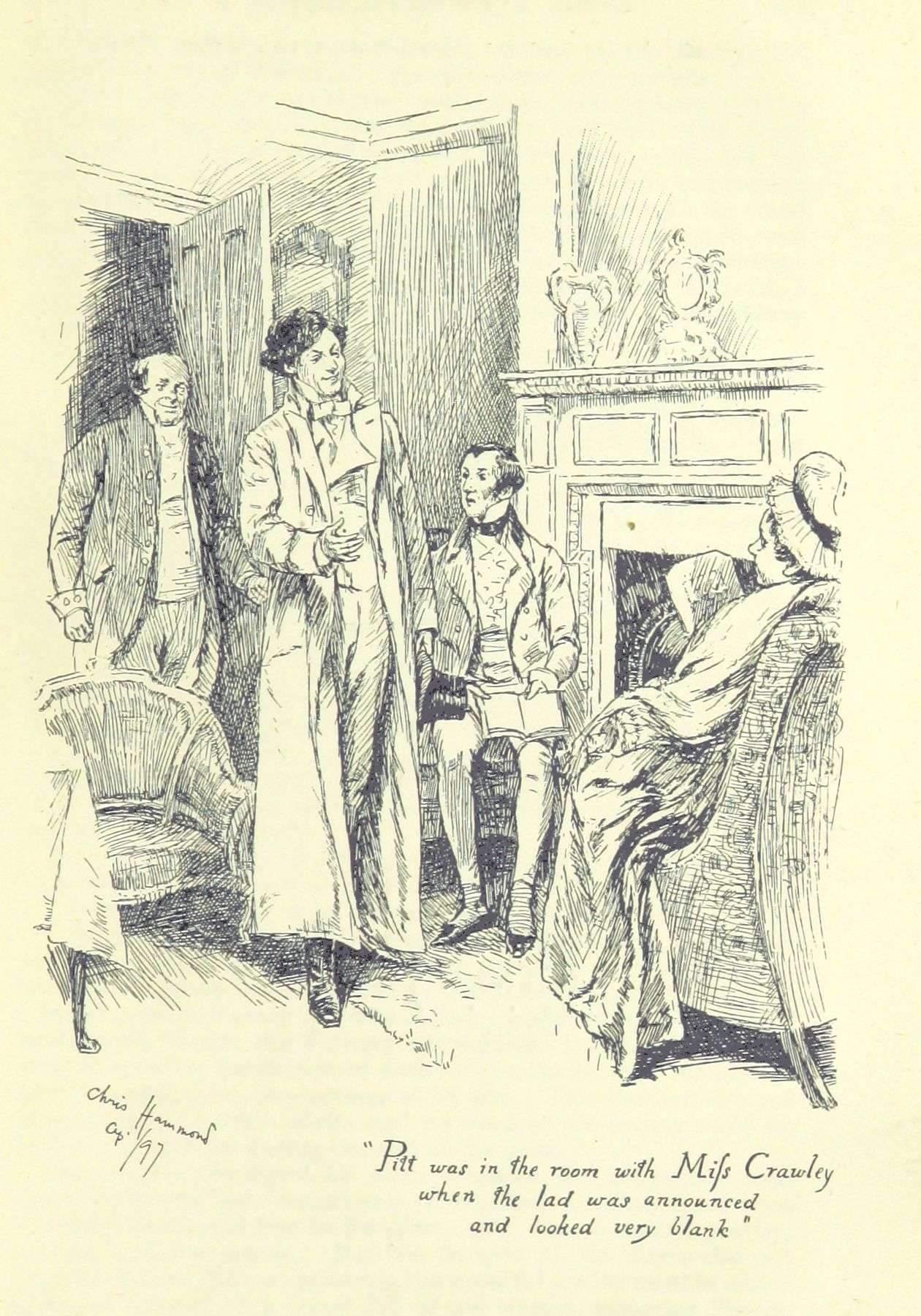
Page 272

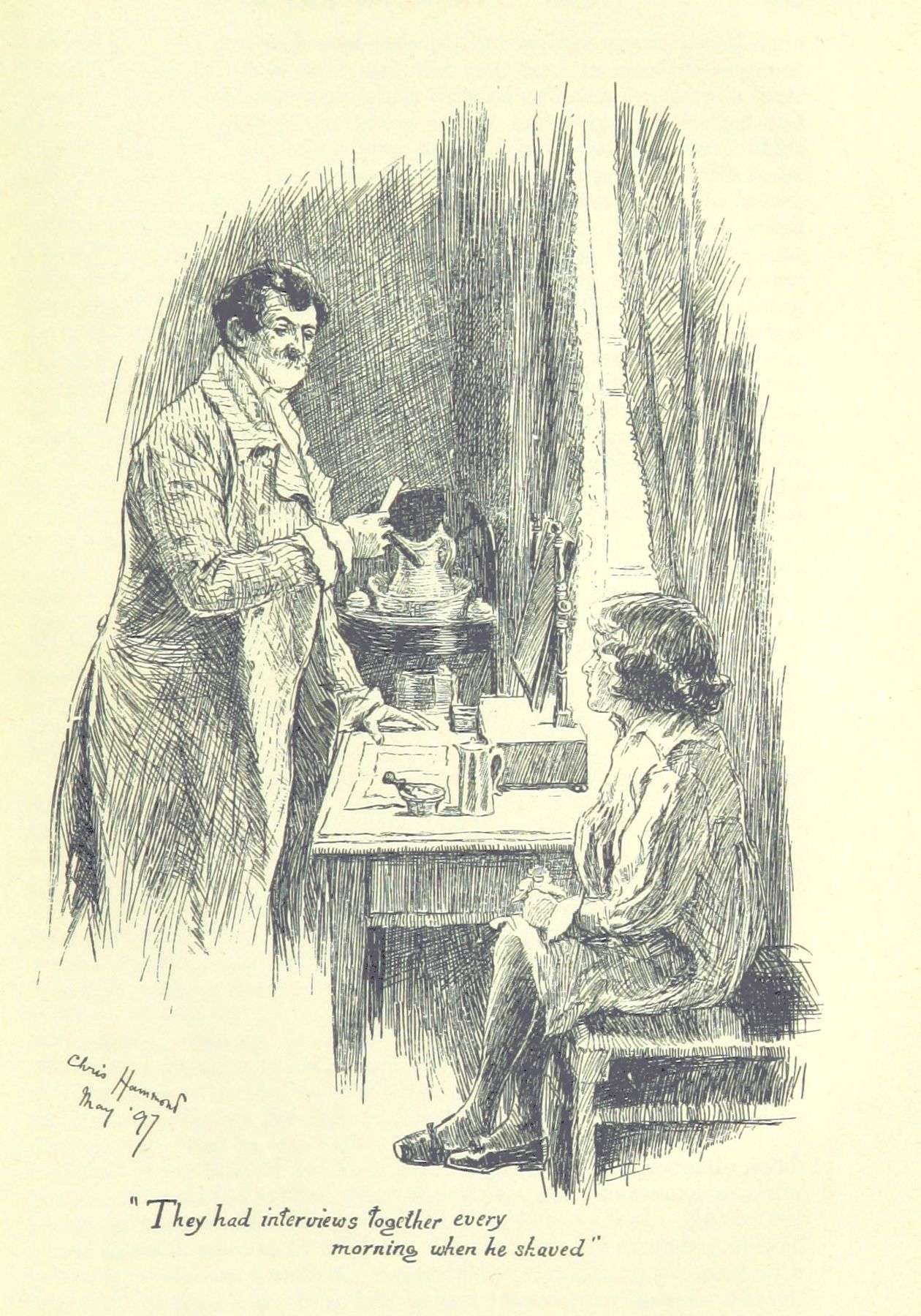
Page 304

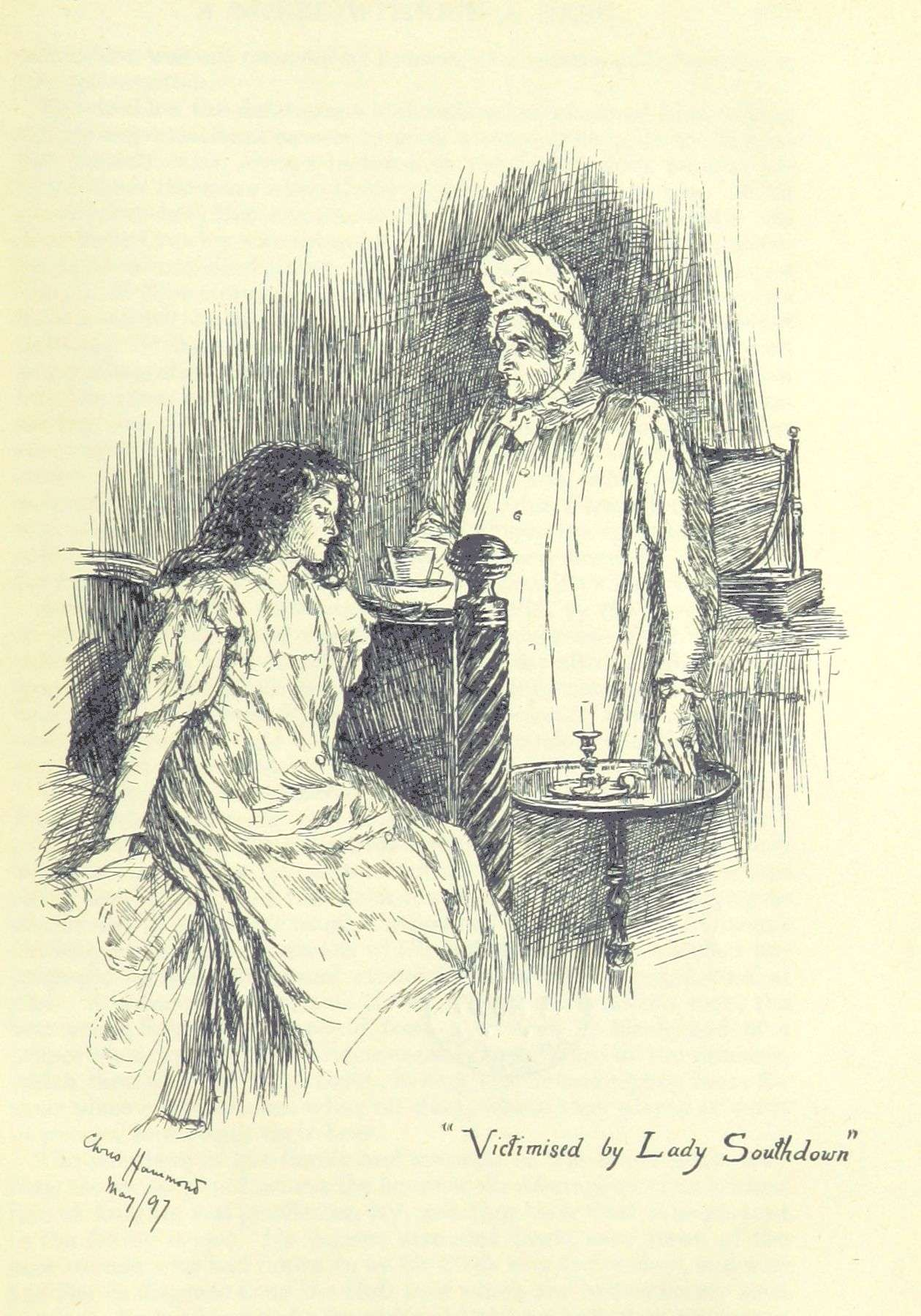
Page 336

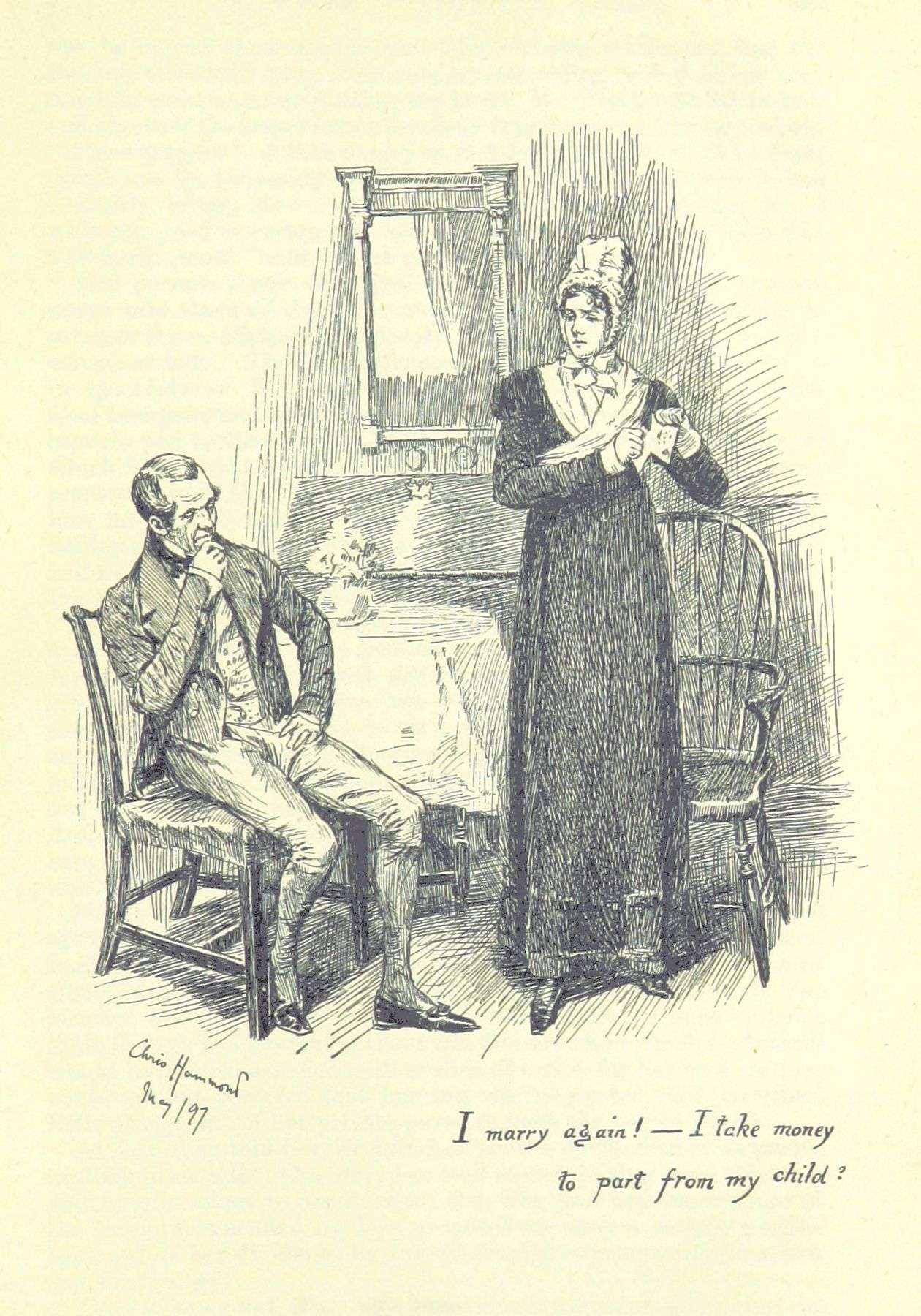
Page 373

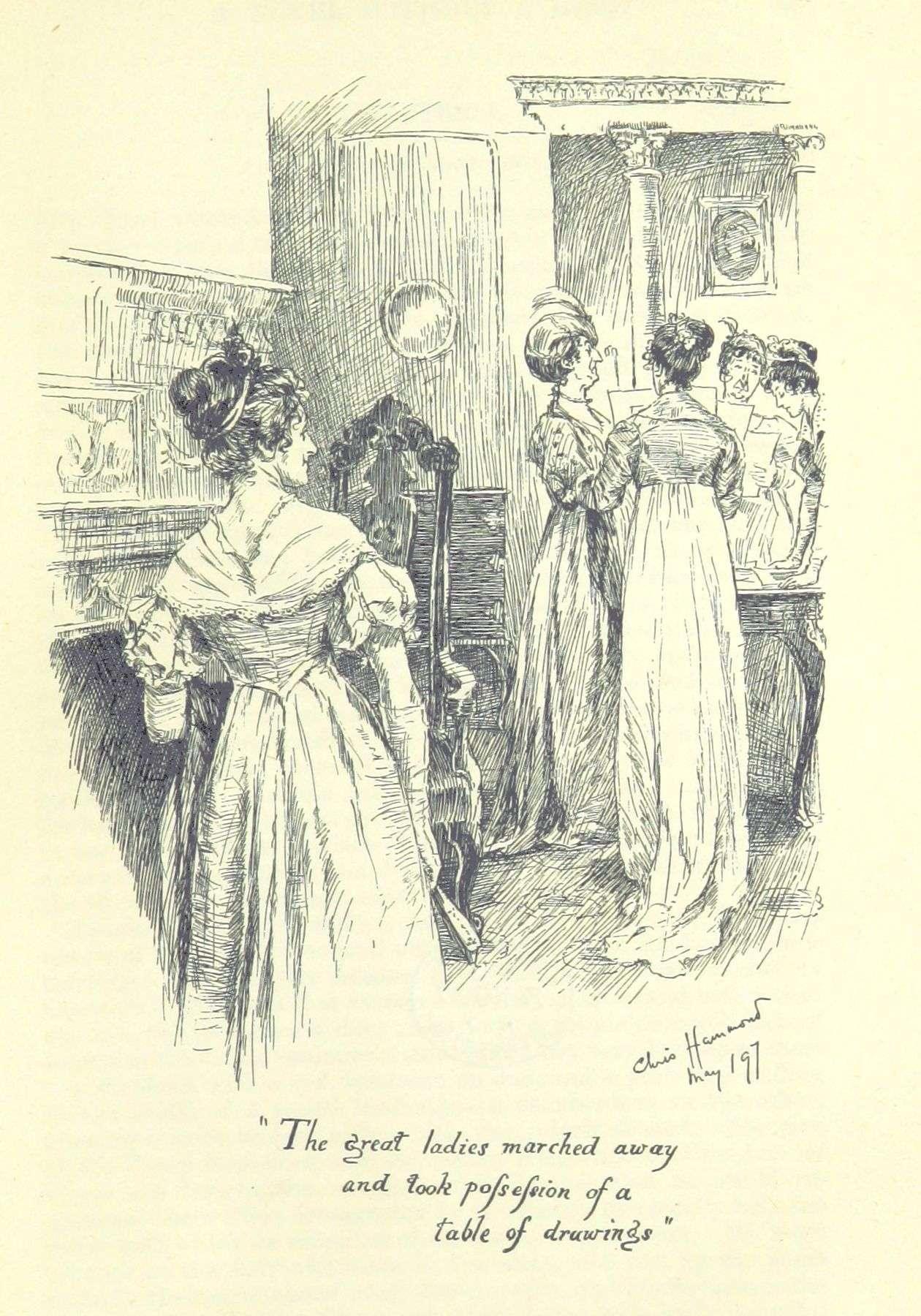
Page 396

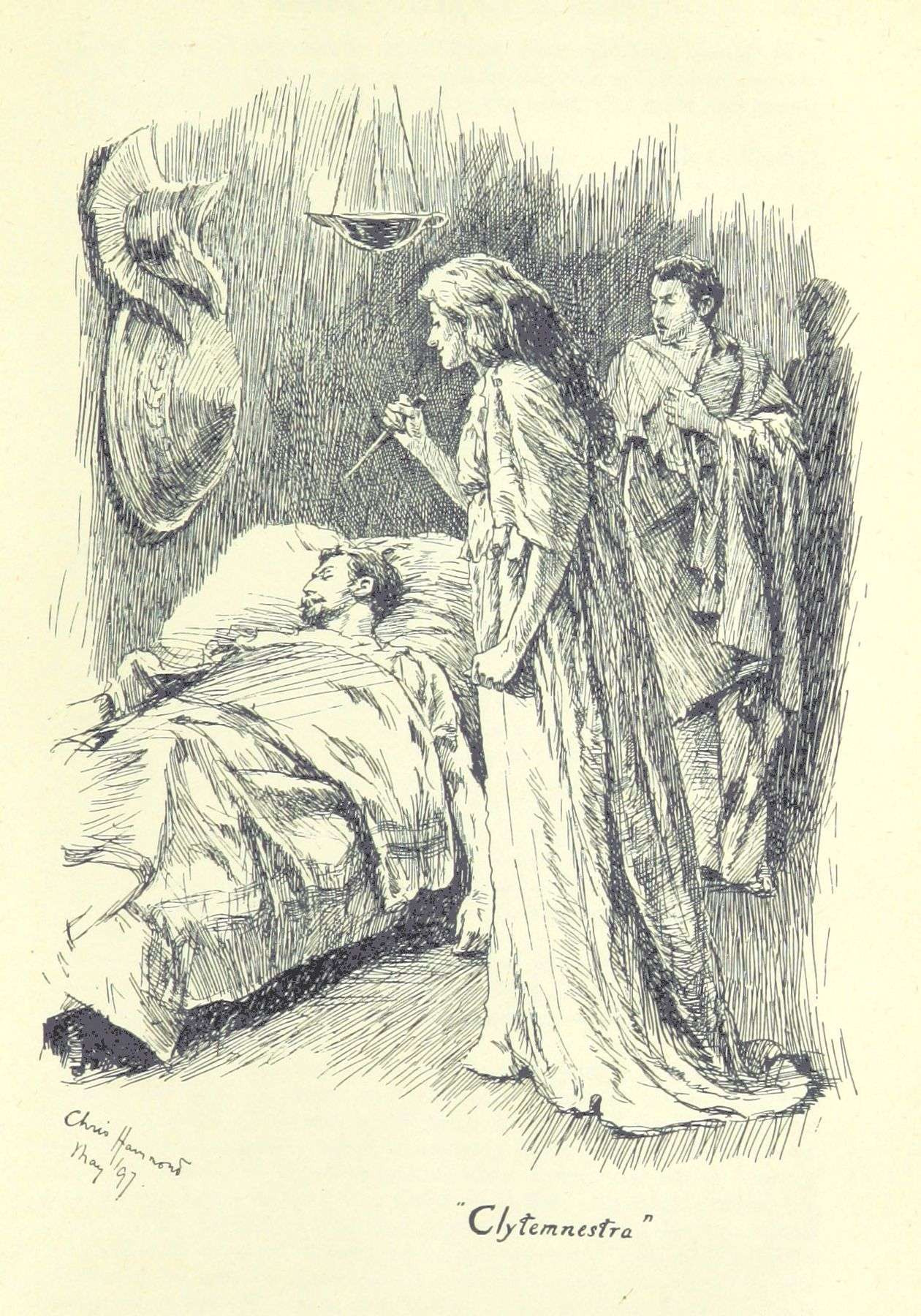
Page 413

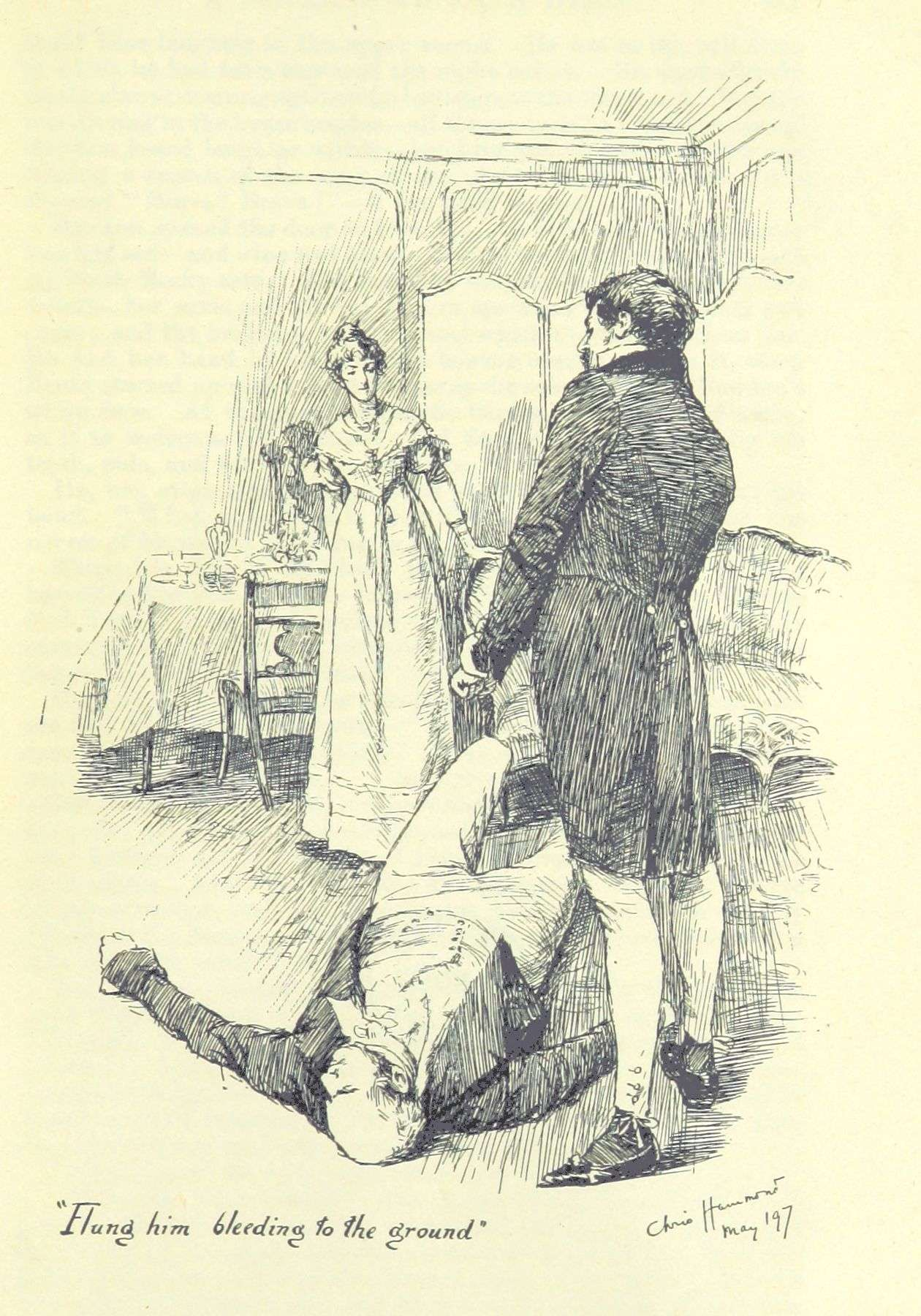
Page 430

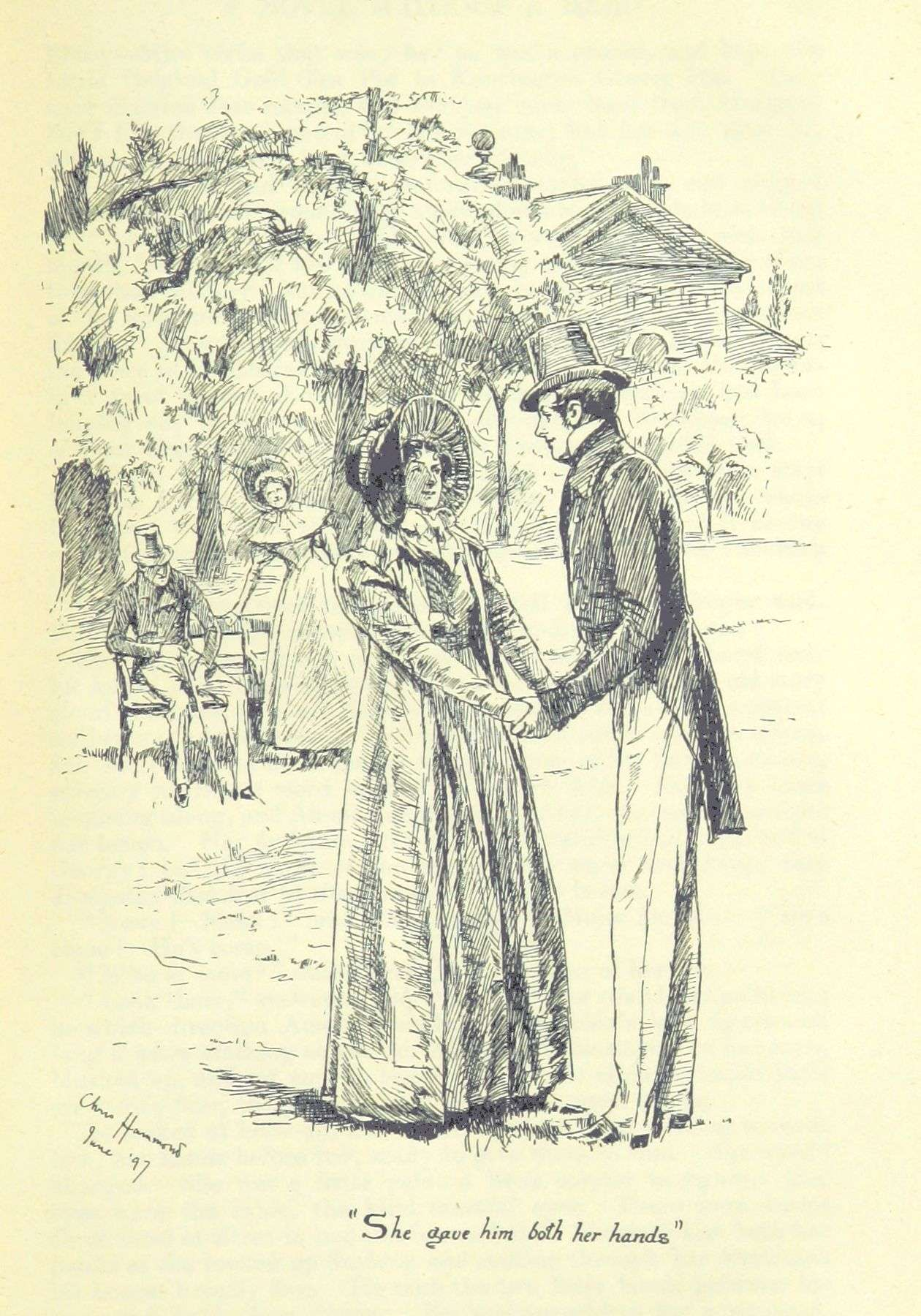
Page 472

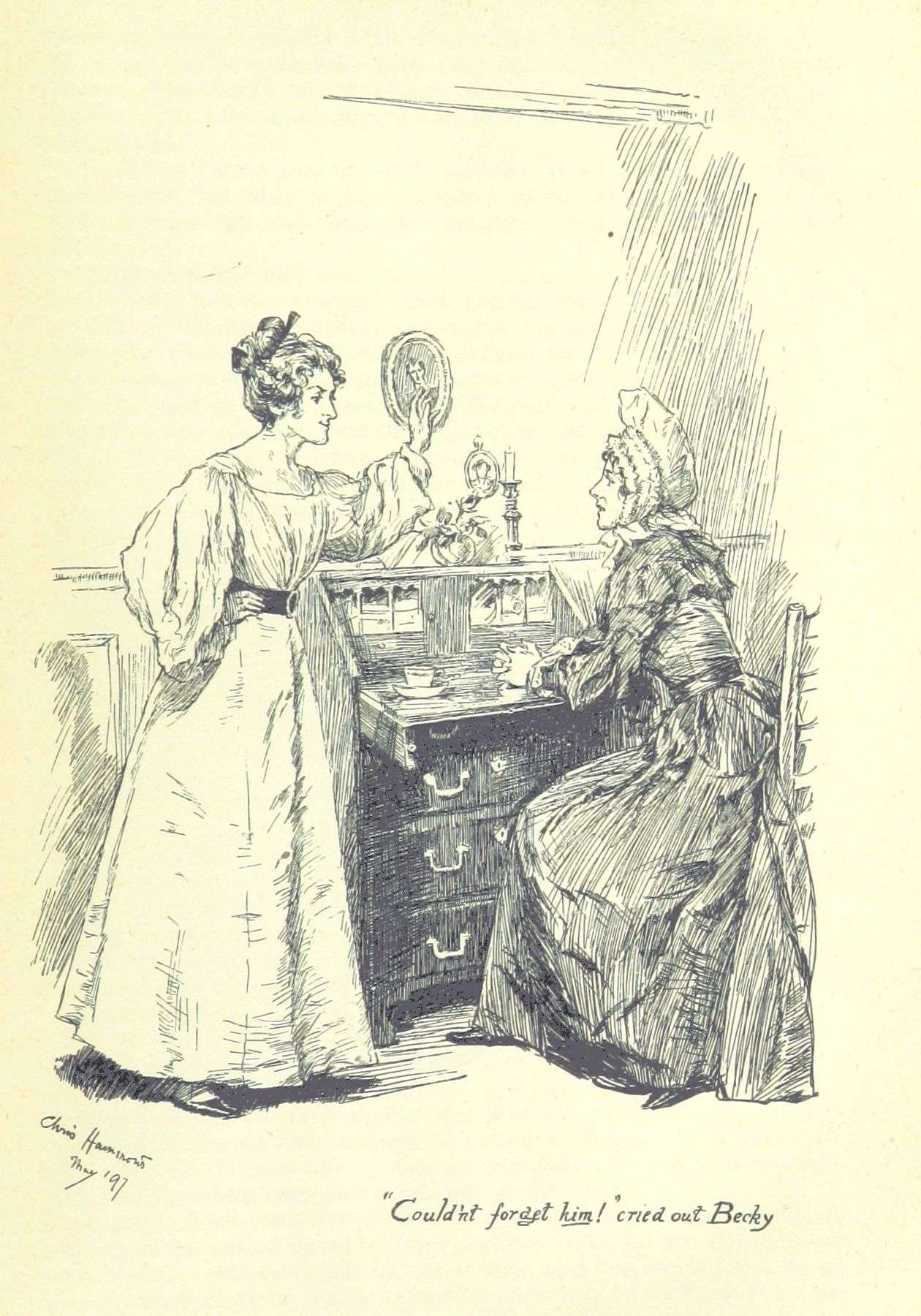
Page 557

== Death ==
Hammond died unexpectedly in the house she shared with her sister and brother-in-law on 11 May 1900, aged 39. Her father had died only two months previously. Her estate was valued at £2,198 2s. Her brother Percy acted as her executor.

== Assessment ==
Forman in her Argosy obituary stated that no competent critic would deny her a place among the foremost six of her contemporaries, and that others, of no less competence, would unhesitatingly rank her among the foremost three. and that Fancy, delicacy, vigour, variety, subtlety of characterisation, distinction in both conception and execution were all in rich measure at Miss Hammond's command.

Thorpe noted that Hammond's delicate and charming pen-drawings were very popular and that she had a long list of books to her credit. However, he also considered that many of her figures – particularly the women – were spoilt by disproportionately small heads, and her sister was the more skilful draftsman. Hammond and her sister in the 1890's were at that time certainly the most distinguished members of their sex in the field of illustration. Peppin concurs with Thorpe's assessment that Gertrude was the better draftsman.

Houfe notes that Hammond's penwork is rather free and she excels in costume subjects in a style not unlike that of the Brocks' eighteenth century pastiches. (Note: Houfe not only gets Hammond's name wrong, calling her Christine rather than Christiana, but also has her alive and active ten years after her death when he describes here as fl. 1886-1910.) Loosey notes that Hammond was the first identifiably female illustrator of Jane Austen’s novels, illustrating three Austen titles for two publishers. And that when compared with other members of the Cranford School, Hammond’s Austen illustrations are on the whole more serious, less whimsical, and more visually surprising than Thomson’s or the Brocks’. Southam calls Hammond the finest artist of this period and states that her decisive and characterized pen-and-ink drawings are neither whimsical nor over decorative.

Cooke states that Hammond's contribution to the Cranford School's escapist discourse of a sentimental pre-industrial Old England was simple but effective. Though representing her characters with historical exactitude, her main focus is on small nuances of facial expression and gesture. This makes her an ideal illustrator for Jane Austen. Cooke summarised by saying that Catering for a large bourgeois audience, her refined and perceptive illustrations had a wide currency, only supplanted by the growing taste for the radicalism of English Art Nouveau.
