= Talgarth Road =

Road in West London

Coordinates: 51.4908°N 0.2157°W

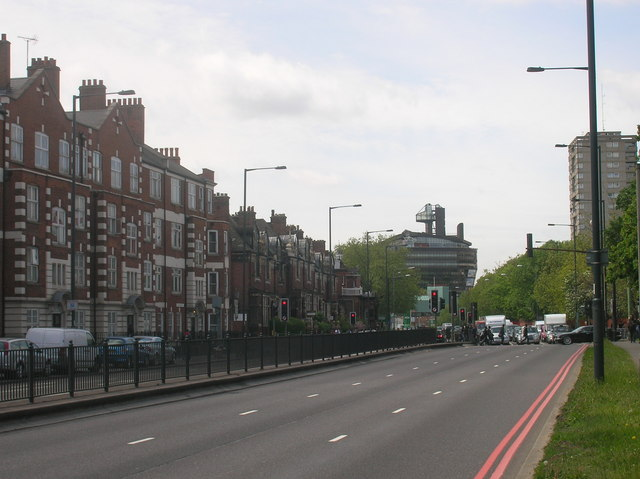
Talgarth Road in West London, view towards Hammersmith

Talgarth Road is a dual carriageway in the London Borough of Hammersmith and Fulham and is a designated part of the A4, running through West London, England on the road to Heathrow Airport. It starts in West Kensington at its junction with North End Road and West Cromwell Road running near Barons Court tube station before ending at Hammersmith Broadway.

In 2016, a green corridor with flood-control and pollution mitigation functions and a bicycle path was created to the north of the flyover.

== History ==
In 1891, eight terraced houses known as St Paul's Studios designed by the architect Frederick Wheeler and notable for their double-storey windows were constructed along the road. Their intended purpose was to inspire artists. Notable residents have included English ballerina Margot Fonteyn, the Irish writer Ernest Gébler, and Jamaican political activist Marcus Garvey, whose residence at No 53 is marked by a blue plaque.

In 2003, the London Academy of Music and Dramatic Art moved to 155 Talgarth Road, which had previously been the site of the Royal Ballet School since 1947.
