= Mary Catherine Rowsell =

Novelist, author of children's books and dramatist

- Born: 29 December 1839; Finsbury, London, England
- Died: 15 June 1921 (aged 81); Bromley, Kent, England
- Occupation: Novelist
- Years active: 1864–1910
- Known for: Writing novels with historical subjects
- Notable work: Traitor or Patriot? A Tale of the Rye-House Plot (1885)
- Relatives: Thomas James Rowsell (uncle), Charles Barry (uncle)

Mary Catherine Rowsell (29 December 1839 – 15 June 1921) was an English novelist, author of children's fiction, and dramatist. Her education in Belgium and Germany resulted in books based on German folk tales, and on French historical figures. Most of her children's books were set around well-known historical events.

== Early life ==
Rowsell was born on 29 December 1839 and baptised in St. Dionis Backchurch on 22 January 1840. Her father was Charles John Rowsell (28 March 1802 – 28 January 1882), an accountant who may have patented the Graphoscope (Note: This is essentially a table top device which holds a photograph or other object on a sliding frame in front of a fixed magnifying glass, or stereo magnifying glasses. Charles first petitioned for a patent for "improvements in apparatus for viewing photographic and other pictures, coins, and medals, which is also applicable in the production of drawings and paintings." However, no record of the granting or eventual voiding of the patent after the statutory period could be found.) and certainly patented improvements to it. (Note: Charles gave notice of the patent application on 28 May 1874, proceeded with the application in October 1824, and lost the patent on 27 May 1877 due to the failure to pay the additional stamp duty of £50 for extending a patent from three to seven years.) Her mother was Sarah Lewis (c. 1807 – buried 18 August 1897), and her parents were married on 6 June 1829, in St. Nicholas, Brighton, Sussex, England. Her uncle was the popular preacher Thomas James Rowsell, and her aunt Sarah Rowsell was married to the architect Sir Charles Barry.

Rowsell was educated at Queen's College, London in Harley Street, and later in Brussels and Bonn. This enabled her to write books based on German folk-tales and on people from French history.

== Work ==
Rowsell produced four types of works: books for children (largely based either on folk tales or on historical subjects), novels for adults, plays, and shorter fiction.

Rowsell's first book was published in her mid twenties, under her initials, "M. C. R.". This was a translation of Rosalie Koch's collection of forty fairy tales, Rübezahl: Berggeist im Riesengebirge ('Rübezahl: Mountain Spirit in the Giant Mountains'; 1845). The first edition of the book was well received, and another edition was issued for the Christmas gift-book market. In advertising the Christmas edition, the publishers quoted the press reviews of the first edition:

- "A charmingly written little volume. The illustrations are very good." – Spectator
- "The tales are no less instructive than entertaining." – Observer
- "A good book to put into the hands of young persons." – Press
- "Will be found amusing by young people." – Dispatch
- "A most capital series of fairy tales, illustrated by many well-executed engravings." – Army and Navy Gazette
- "The present collection of tales is the best we have seen." – Sunday Times
- "Equals in interest the Arabian Nights." – Bayswater Chronicle
- "To our young friends we commend the Spirit of the Giant Mountains." – Illustrated News of the World

Despite this initial success Rowsell had no further work published until Abbots' Crag in July 1872. On this occasion the author was identified as M. C. Rowsell.

=== List of longer works ===
The following list is based on searches on the Jisc Library Hub Discover, which collates the catalogues of 162 national, academic, and specialist libraries in the UK and Ireland. The online availability of texts is indicated for the following repositories:

- BL – The British Library
- IA – The Internet Archive
- HT – HathiTrust
- FL – Baldwin Library of Historical Children's Literature at the University of Florida

Longer fiction and plays written by Rowsell
Serial	Year	Title	Pages	Publisher	BL	IA	HT	FL	Notes
1	1864	The Spirit of the Giant Mountains: A Series of Fairy Tales	231 p., 9 pl., 8º	London: Murray & Co	No	No	No	No	(Note: A translation of Rosalie Koch's Rübezahl: Berggeist im Riesengebirge (1845). First published under Rowsell's initials "M. C. R.", but republished in 1884 under her full name. The London Sun said the book was altogether "... a very pleasant collection of tales, which will introduce their young readers into a world quite new to them.")
2	1872	Abbots' Crag: A Tale	168 p., 8º	London: Whittaker	No	No	No	No	(Note: A one volume novelette. This was not well received, with The Graphic calling it "a novelette of a feeble character..." which was "... made up of very improbable incidents.")
3	1874	Plays for Home Performance: Thornrose and Sparkledor; Riquet with the Tuft	63 p., 8º	London: Samuel French	No	No	Yes	No	(Note: There was an amateur performance of Prince Riquet with the Tuft directed by Rowsell on 1 February 1876 in the Council Chamber of Old Fellows' Hall, Brighton. The Era called it "a charming fairy piece".)
4	1876	Saint Nicolas' Eve, and Other Tales	256 p., 8º	London: Samuel Tinsley	Yes	Yes	No	No	(Note: This was a collection of six stories largely set in France. While the initial publisher was Samuel Tinsley, the 1879 reissue was by Griffith and Farran. However, while The London Daily News said that the stories in the volume exhibited "dramatic and descriptive power", and that while "On the whole, their literary merit is above the average ...", having characters alternately speak in French and English did not work. The Globe agreed that their literary merit is above the average. Truth was also dubious about mixing French and English and advised the author: "... to restrain her passion for bits of French. A French exclamation here and there may be excused as marring to remind us that we are on French ground; but the piebald talk of Miss Rowsell's foreign folk is slightly absurd." The Hampshire Advertiser said the book was "... written in a very clear, concise style, and show considerable mastery in the delineation of character.")
5	1878	Love Loyal	3 v., 8º	London: Hurst & Blackett	Yes	No	No	No	(Note: This was Rowsell's first three-volume novel, three volumes being the norm for novels at the time. The story tells of how a young man ended up as a novice in a Benedictine Monastery in the Piedmontese Alps. The Graphic said "We can recommend this book as one that may be read with some pleasure ...", and the publisher's advertisement quoted the Athenaeum as calling it "A pleasant story." and the Messenger as describing it "A well-constructed and ably-written Novel".)
6	1880	Jeannette	3 v., 8º	London: Hurst & Blackett	No	Yes	No	No	(Note: Rowsell's second three-volume novel tells of how two sisters toss an unfortunate young Baronet between them in the spirit of self-sacrifice. Critical reaction was mixed as best, with The Graphic saying that "Altogether the novel, while of strictly average merit and interest, cannot be recommended to any readers but those who rejoice in those nonsensical chains of misunderstandings which, were they possible in real life, would speedily reduce this plant tot the condition of a satellite of Bedlam". However the Morning Post quoted the Court Journal as stating that "The plot is thoroughly true to nature, the characters are drawn with a master hand, the descriptions are cleverly delineated, and the language if forcible and characteristic.")
7	1882	Hymns and Narrative Verses for Children (third edition)	30 p., 16º	London: J. T. Hayes	No	No	No	No	(Note: This was apparently the third edition, but no details of earlier editions could be found. The book was published again at least in 1902.)
8	1883	Tales of Filial Devotion: Examples of the Faithful Heroism of Girls, Drawn from French History	198 p., 8º	London: Sonnenschein & Co	No	Yes	No	No	(Note: Six stories of the heroism of young girls, all drawn from French history. In the Preface, Rowsell said that only one, Joséphine Tascher de La Pagerie, the wife of Napoleon, was likely to be known to an English audience, but hoped that the examples of self-sacrifice and tender affection would strengthen a like spirit in her readers.)
9	1884	Number Nip; or, the Spirit of the Giant Mountains	286 p., 8º	London: Sonnenschein & Co	No	Yes	No	No	(Note: A reissue of The Spirit of the Giant Mountains (1864). This time the Graphic judged that this illustrated collection of fairy stories was "certain to please young folk in winter evenings".)
10	1884	Traitor or Patriot? A Tale of the Rye-House Plot	vi, 287, fs., 8º	London: Blackie & Son	No	Yes	Yes	No	(Note: Illustrated by C. O. Murray and Charles Joseph Staniland. A story woven around the Rye House Plot to assassinate Charles II of England and his brother James. The Leeds Mercury described the book as "a powerfully story" and says that Rowsell "... is quite successful in giving to her characters the manners and speech of other times." The Glasgow Herald described the story as being "... full of action and capitally told." The Observer says that Rowsell's "... manner of story telling is extremely pleasant.")
11	1885	The Pedlar and his Dog	160 p. : ill., 8º	London: Blackie & Son	No	Yes	Yes	No	(Note: Illustrated by George Cruikshank. The available on-line versions have a colour frontispiece by Frank Cheyne Pape. Set in Elizabethan times, this is the story of a pedlar who dreams of being a second Dick Whittington. The Liverpool Mercury said "... The narrative is so bright and sparkling, and introduces so much of real history, that young people will take to it at once." The Glasgow Herald says "The story is well and pleasingly told and would make a suitable gift-book for boys or girls.")
12	1885	Miss Vanbrugh: A Stage Story	158, [4] p., 12º	Bristol: G. W. Arrowsmith	No	No	No	No	(Note: A shilling novel published by G. W. Arrowsmith of Bristol for which Rosell used the pen name "Pen Derwas". This was a love triangle set in the theatre. The Glasgow Herald said: "This is one of the small sensational novelettes for which the Bristol publisher has acquired a name... The present story, however, has a good deal more in it than such literature can generally boast of... the dialogue is clever and the whole work bears the stamp of ability far above the average." The Northern Echo said that "The story is well told..." The story must have sold well, as Kirk notes that there was a second edition in 1886. Arrowsmith's shilling novels had paper covers.)
13	1886	Fisherman Grim	96 p., 8º	London: Blackie & Son	No	No	No	Yes	(Note: The tradition of the town of Grimsby is that it was founded by Fisherman Grim, who saved the young Danish prince Havelock from being murdered by his Uncle so that he could take the throne. This book is a retelling of this story for children. When reviewing Thorndyke Manor the Freeman's Journal said that Fisherman Grim and Hans the Painter were remembered with a good deal of approval. The book is available online in the Osborne Collection of Early Children's Books at Toronto Public Library.)
14	1886	Sepperl the Drummer-Boy	95 p., fs., 8º	London: Blackie & Son	No	No	No	Yes	(Note: This children's story tells of the early life of Josef Haydn. Sepperl is a diminutive form of Sepper, a synonym for Joseph in German. The tell how Haydn, by courage and patience, became a great musician. It was serialised in the Children's Page of The Etude from May 1906.)
15	1886	The Silver Dial	3 v., 8º	London: Swan Sonnenschein	No	Yes	Yes	No	(Note: This was another three-volume novel. The Graphic described it as "a story of conspicuous interest and ability". The story centres around a blind clockmaker. The Graphic also says that "The strength of the novel lies in its portraiture" and that "a consider vein of humour" helps to render the book "exceeding enjoyable".)
16	1887	Hans the Painter	96 p., fs., 8º	London: Blackie & Son	No	No	No	Yes	(Note: Tells the story of how Hans Holbein came to London, visited Sir Thomas More, found a friend in Erasmus, and became painter to Henry VIII. When reviewing Thorndyke Manor the Freeman's Journal said that Fisherman Grim and Hans the Painter were remembered with a good deal of approval.)
17	1887	Hatto's Tower and Other Stories	127 p., 8º	London: Blackie & Son	No	No	No	No	(Note: The main story is a retelling of the tale of Bishop Hatto of Mainz who was notoriously cruel and treacherous. Legend has it that he was pursued to a tower on an island on the Rhine and eaten by mice. The other stories are "King Harry and the Abbot of Reading", and "The Opal Ring".)
18	1888	The Red House	176 p., 8º	London: Hamilton, Adams & Co	Yes	No	No	No	(Note: A gentleman's heir has had advances from moneylenders against his eventual inheritance, but the principal clings to life. The borrower then raised the possibility of a profitable marriage. Serialised in the Ottawa Evening Journal in Canada and in the Australian Star. The London Morning Post called the leading characters "good sketches", but said that some sensational scenes are overdone. Still, the Post concludes, "Rowell is a fair sensation writer" and the book "is a better story than many of its class." The Era noted that the novel had been "dramatised in four acts and the rights secured" (i.e. by a single performance to establish copyright).)
19	1889	John a' Dale; or, The King and the Tinker	128 p., 8º	London: Blackie & Son	No	No	No	No	(Note: Deals with the boyhood of Charles I and his "whipping boy".)
20	1889	Whips of Steel			No	No	No	No	(Note: A comedy drama in four acts by Rowsell and J. J. Dilly. Produced by Edwin Gilbert at St George's Hall, 7 May 1889. Said to be based on the novel of the same name by Dilly and Rowsell, but so such novel found in Jisc Library Hub Discover.)
21	1890	The Story of a Queen	159 p., 8º	London: Blackie & Son	No	No	No	No	(Note: A retelling of the story of Marie of Brabant for children. The Yorkshire Herald said that the actual story of the young queen of Philip the Bold of France is "put into a pleasant narrative in which its romantic incidents acquire a new charm".)
22	1890	Thorndyke Manor	287 p., 8º	London: Blackie & Son	No	No	No	No	(Note: Illustrated by L. Leslie Brooke, Brian Alderson and J. F. Byry. A villain attempts to implicate an innocent squire in a Jacobite plot, but his sister manages to prove his innocence after he has been confined in the Tower of London. Freeman Journal said that this historical novel "well repays perusal" and that it "would make a very pleasant Christmas gift to any young lady, or, for that matter, to anyone fond of reading a carefully written historical novel". The Sydney Daily Telegraph called it "an attractive story".)
23	1891	Petronella; and Madame Ponowski	107 p., fs., 8º	London: Skeffington & Son	No	No	No	No	(Note: Pertronella is a romance set in the days of George II of Great Britain, and introduced the South Sea Bubble and other incidents of the time. Lloyds Weekly says that Madame Ponowski is "a clever tale of French life" and the two stories together "present a striking contrast." Petronella was dramatised by Edwin Gilbert as the costume play White Roses. The book must have sold well as there was a new edition in 1892.)
24	1892	Richard's Play: A Comedietta, in One Act	16 p., 8º	London: Samuel French	No	No	No	No	(Note: A one act costume comedy. Written with Joseph J. Dilly. First performed at Ladbroke Hall. Performed at Terry's Theatre, then at the Parkhurst Theatre, and had a run of 125 nights as a curtain-raiser for A Trip to Chinatown at Toole's and the Strand Theatre. Advertised by Samuel French as being a curtain-raiser suitable for professional or amateur use.)
25	1894	The Friend of the People	3 v., 8º	London: T. F. Unwin	No	Yes	Yes	No	(Note: A three-volume novel set against the background of the Reign of Terror. The illegitimate son of a Marquis plots to impersonate and supplant his legitimate brother. The Glasgow Herald said "... the novel is really interesting all through... the story has been carefully written, and may be recommended as good example of the modern semi-historical novel." It was serialised in the North Eastern Daily Gazette 1n 1900. Rowsell with H. A. Saintsbury turned it into a five act drama with and first produced in Haymarket for copyright purposed in 1894, and then performed in Haymarket on 17 February 1898.)
26	1896	The Green Men of Norwell, and Other Stories	87 p., 8º	London: Simpkin & Marshall	No	No	No	No	(Note: Lloyds Weekly said "Youngsters always relish the tales that are told of the stirring days of old, and therefore this little book is sure to be appreciated.")
27	1897	France: The Children's Study	362 p., fs., 8º	London: T. Fisher Unwin	No	Yes	Yes	No	(Note: The Inter Ocean of Chicago called it "a concise, terse, well-worded history from Gaul under the Roman empire to the end of the reign of terror, and the republic. The authors deftly interweaves in her history personals and romances which relieve it of all dullness.")
28	1898	The Boys of Fairmead	319 p., 8º	London: F. Warne & Co	No	No	No	No	(Note: Illustrated by Christiana Mary Demain Hammond. Tells the story of two brother who become fast friends without being aware of their relationship.)
29	1899	Honour Bright	48 p., 8º	London: E. Nister	No	Yes	No	No	(Note: Illustrated by E. Stuart Hardy . The future Charles II of England when a young boy runs away from his guardians and is succoured by a Roundhead miller.)
30	1900	Dick of Temple Bar	127 p., ill.	London: E. Nister	No	No	No	No	(Note: Illustrated by Lance Thackeray. The hero Dick, is a clerk in Child's Bank and saves the bank from robbery.)
31	1902	The Last Link		London: Samuel French	No	No	No	No	(Note: A one act play written with H. A. Saintsbury. Advertised by Samuel French as being a curtain-raiser suitable for professional or amateur use.)
32	1903	My Lady's Favour, a Comedy by M. C. Rowsell and E. G. Howell		London: Samuel French	No	No	No	No	(Note: A one act black and white comedy written with E. Gilbert Howell. Advertised by Samuel French as being a curtain-raiser suitable for professional or amateur use.)
33	1905	The Life-Story of Charlotte de la Trémoille: Countess of Derby	viii, 188 p., ill., 8º	London: K. Paul, Trench, Trübner	No	Yes	Yes	No	(Note: Tells the story of the Countess of Derby and her defence of Lathom House when it was besieged by Parliamentary Forces during the English Civil War. The Publisher's advert in the Westminster Gazette quotes the Publishers Circular as saying "The book in eminently readable... ")
34	1905	The Wild Swans, or, The Adventure of Roland Cleeve	128, 32 p., ill., 8º	London: S. W. Partridge & Co	No	No	No	No	(Note: The Western Daily Press said "The writer has a captivating style ... a charming tale ... an excellent gift-book for boys or girls.")
35	1907	Monsieur de Paris: a Romance	306 p.	London: Chatto & Windus	No	No	Yes	No	(Note: A fictional account of the life of Madame Du Barry, the official mistress of Louis XV. The Melbourne Herald notes that Rowell "has already made her name in the Literary world, and has, since 1884, written several stories of considerable merit," and states that this novel "is powerfully written and may well be called a thorough expose of the terrible bestiality and brutality which formed the real background of the Reign of Terror.")
36	1910	Ninon de L'Enclos and Her Century	ix, 310 p., 2 pl., 8º	London: Hurst & Blackett	No	Yes	Yes	No	(Note: A biography of the French historical figure Ninon de L'Enclos. The Houston Post said that the book is not only "a biography of an interesting woman, but also pictures French social life and custom in the seventeenth century." The London Observer said "Miss Rowsell writes with a spirited and gossiping pen... " The New York Times called the book a "highly diverting volume" but says that her style "constantly verges on the pompous and turgid.")
37	1920	The Sea-King's Son and Fisherman Grim	78 p., 8º	London: Blackie & Son	No	No	No	No	(Note: Appears to be a re-issue of Fisherman Grim)

=== Serials and shorter works ===
Rowsell edited the short lived (one volume only) St. Paul's Magazine in 1889. This should not be confused with Saint Paul's, a monthly magazine edited by Anthony Trollope which ran for 14 volumes from 1867 – 1874. Rowsell contributed, with James Macdonald Oxley and John Alexander Hammerton to The Children's Friend: a Magazine for Boys and Girls at Home and School (London: S. W. Partridge) in 1902 and 1903.

Several of Rowell's published novels were serialised, but she also published shorter fiction and serial stories including:

- "The Secret of the Ivory Room", a longer short story. Appeared in the Adelaide Observer in 1906.
- "Uncle Will's Wager", a short story. Appeared in the Otago Witness, New Zealand in 1912.
- "The Heir of Willowcote": A serial story in which a baby is rescued from destruction by a midwife and spirited away from a country house. It appeared in the Ottawa Evening Journal, in the Leominster News, and others. A review of another Rowsell book in 1901 listed the story among the publication credits for Rowsell, suggesting it may have been published as a book.
- "Monksford Ferry", a longer short story. Appeared in multiple newspapers including the Sunday Citizen in Brooklyn, the Eastern Press in Norfolk in 1899, and in the Western Chronicle in 1905.
- "Paul Stormont's First Wife", a short story. Appeared in Norfolk News in 1900, and other outlets.

== Later life ==
Rowsell had fallen on hard times by the end of the 19th century. The small annuity left her by her father, who died in 1882, and her mother, who died in 1897, shrank due to bad investment choices. As a result, she appealed four times to the Royal Literary Fund. (Note: This is a benevolent fund set up to help published British writers in financial difficulties. Despite the word 'Royal' in the title, it is entirely financed by voluntary contributions rather than by the Government. Nowadays it is mostly financed by the income from bequests of authors' rights.) Rowsell died at 81 years of age on 15 June 1921. The cause of death was stated to be epilepsy and senile decay.
