= Plymouth Adventure =

1952 film by Clarence Brown

- original film poster
- Directed by: Clarence Brown
- Written by: Helen Deutsch
- Based on: The Plymouth Adventure; 1950 novel by Ernest Gébler
- Produced by: Dore Schary
- Starring: Spencer Tracy; Gene Tierney; Van Johnson; Leo Genn
- Cinematography: William H. Daniels
- Edited by: Robert J. Kern
- Music by: Miklós Rózsa
- Production company: Metro-Goldwyn-Mayer
- Distributed by: Loew's, Inc.
- Release date: November 14, 1952
- Running time: 105 minutes
- Country: United States
- Language: English
- Budget: $3.2 million
- Box office: $3 million

Plymouth Adventure is a 1952 American Technicolor historical drama film with an ensemble cast starring Spencer Tracy, Gene Tierney, Van Johnson and Leo Genn, made by Metro-Goldwyn-Mayer, directed by Clarence Brown, and produced by Dore Schary. The screenplay was adapted by Helen Deutsch from the 1950 novel The Voyage of the Mayflower by Ernest Gébler. The supporting cast includes Barry Jones, Dawn Addams, Lloyd Bridges and John Dehner.

This was veteran director Brown's final film.

== Plot ==
The film tells a fictionalized version of the Pilgrims' voyage across the Atlantic Ocean to North America aboard the Mayflower. During the long sea voyage, Capt. Christopher Jones falls in love with Dorothy Bradford, the wife of William Bradford. The love triangle is resolved in a tragic way at the film's conclusion. Ship's carpenter John Alden — said to be the first person to set foot on Plymouth Rock in 1620 — catches the eye of Priscilla Mullins, one of the young Pilgrims following William Bradford. Alden ultimately wins Priscilla in another, if subtler, triangle with Miles Standish.

== Cast ==
- Spencer Tracy as Christopher Jones
- Gene Tierney as Dorothy Bradford
- Van Johnson as John Alden
- Leo Genn as William Bradford
- Barry Jones as William Brewster
- Dawn Addams as Priscilla Mullins
- Lloyd Bridges as First Mate Coppin
- Noel Drayton as Miles Standish
- John Dehner as Gilbert Winslow
- Tommy Ivo as William Butten
- Lowell Gilmore as Edward Winslow
- Paul Cavanagh as Governor John Carver (uncredited)
- Don Dillaway as Stephen Hopkins (uncredited)
- Elizabeth Flournoy as Rose Standish (uncredited)
- Ivis Goulding as Alice Mullins (uncredited)
- Harvey M. Guzik as Oceanus Hopkins (uncredited)
- Elizabeth Harrower as Elizabeth Hopkins (uncredited)
- Kathleen Lockhart as Mary Brewster (uncredited)
- Murray Matheson as Christopher Martin (uncredited)
- Matt Moore as William Mullins (uncredited)
- Hugh Pryne as Samuel Fuller (uncredited)
- John Sherman as John Billington (uncredited)
- Rhys Williams as Mr. Weston (uncredited)

== Production ==
Schary said at the time "I don't think that historical era has been done properly on screen before because the people were too soft. The pilgrims had to be tough and lusty to accomplish what they did. So that's the kind we cast in the film."

== Reception ==
According to MGM records, the film earned $1,909,000 in the U.S. and Canada and $1,116,000 elsewhere; but, because of its high cost, ended up incurring a loss of $1,856,000.

Major film reviewers in newspapers and magazines tended to praise the film's production values, while noting to different degrees performances and lapses in historical accuracy.

== Awards and honors ==
The picture won the Oscar for Best Effects. The actual model of the Mayflower ship from the movie is on display at the Original Benjamin's Calabash Seafood restaurant in Myrtle Beach, South Carolina. The model was purchased in an auction in the mid-1980s.

== See also ==
- Plymouth Colony
- List of passengers on the Mayflower
