= Carlo Gébler =

Irish writer (born 1954)

- Born: 21 August 1954 (age 72); Dublin, Ireland
- Education: University of York
- Occupations: Writer; television director; teacher
- Children: 5
- Parents: Ernest Gébler; Edna O'Brien
- Writing career
- Genres: Short story; history

Carlo Gébler (born 21 August 1954) is an Irish writer, television director, and teacher. His publications include novels, short stories, plays, historical works and memoirs. He is a member of Aosdána.

== Early life ==
Gébler was born in Dublin, the elder son of the Irish writers Ernest Gébler and Edna O'Brien, and was named Karl after Karl Marx. He moved with his parents to London in 1958. His parents separated in 1962. After the separation Carlo and his younger brother at first stayed with their father but later went to live with their mother. Carlo had a very difficult relationship with his father, from whom he was later estranged for many years.

== Education ==
Gébler attended Bedales School. As a child, he had a "fraught relationship" with his father, who placed "repeated emphasis on the boy's stupidity". He graduated from the University of York, where he studied English. He later graduated from the National Film and Television School. In 2009 he was awarded a PhD by Queen's University Belfast.

== Work ==
Gébler directed his first film for television in 1979. He won the Best Regional Documentary RTS Award for his 1998 production Put to the Test.

Gébler's first novel, The Eleventh Summer, was published in 1985 and was succeeded by August in July in 1986 and Work and Play in 1987. In 1988 his first non-fiction book, Driving Through Cuba: An East-West Journey was published, followed by novels in 1990 and 1991. Gébler's subsequent works include plays and screenplays, libretti, children's books, short stories, novels and several memoirs.

Several of Gébler's novels are based on historical murder cases. Reviewing the 2011 novel, The Dead Eight, based on events that took place in rural Tipperary in 1940, Julian Evans described Gébler as an "overlooked novelist" with a "Swiftian understanding of the world's secret machinations".

In 2000 he published Father and I, a memoir of his relationship with his emotionally abusive father, from whom he was estranged for much of his life. His 2014 biography of his father, The Projectionist: The Story of Ernest Gébler is based on Ernest's diaries and notes for an autobiography, left unwritten on his death in 1998. The Times Literary Supplement's review of The Projectionist noted the author's "emotional empathy" and remarked that "this loving care gives the subject importance beyond the surface facts". Gébler's relationship with his father also figures largely in his 2015 memoir Confessions of a Catastrophist.

From 1991 to 1997 Gébler worked with prisoners at the Maze Prison as a creative writing tutor. From 1997 to 2015 he was writer in residence at HM Prison Maghaberry. He has described his prison teaching experience as "a time when, I assert, I learnt more than at any other time in my life".

Gébler teaches a course on "Writing for a Living" at Trinity College Dublin's Oscar Wilde Centre, where he is an Assistant Professor in Creative Writing. He has also taught at Queen's University Belfast, where he was a Royal Literary Fund Fellow in 2009.

Gébler has been a member of Aosdána since 1990.

== Personal life ==
Carlo Gébler lives in Enniskillen, County Fermanagh, in Northern Ireland. He is married and has five children. His younger brother, Sasha Gébler, is an architect.

== Bibliography ==
=== Novels ===
- —— (1985). The Eleventh Summer.
- —— (1986). August in July.
- —— (1987). Work and Play.
- —— (1990). Caught on a Train.
- —— (1991). Life of a Drum.
- —— (1994). The Cure.
- —— (1998). How to Murder a Man.
- —— (2008). A Good Day for a Dog.
- —— (2011). The Dead Eight.
- —— (2017). The Innocent of Falkland Road.

=== Young adult fiction and novels ===
- —— (2003). August '44.
- —— (2005). The Bull Raid.

=== Short story collections ===
- —— (1996). W9 and Other Lives.

=== Memoirs ===
- —— (2000). Father and I: A Memoir.
- —— (2008). My Father's Watch: The Story of a Child Prisoner in 70s Britain.
- —— (2015). Confessions of a Catastrophist.

=== Non-Fiction ===
- —— (1988). Driving Through Cuba: An East-West Journey.
- —— (1991). The Glass Curtain: Inside an Ulster Community.
- —— (1998). Frozen Out.
- —— (2005). The Siege of Derry.
- —— (2014). The Projectionist: The Story of Ernest Gébler.

=== Plays ===
- —— (2000). Dance of Death.
- —— (2002). 10 Rounds.
- —— (2007). Henry and Harriet: And Other Plays.
- —— (2019). I, Antigone.
