= Frederick Wheeler =

British architect

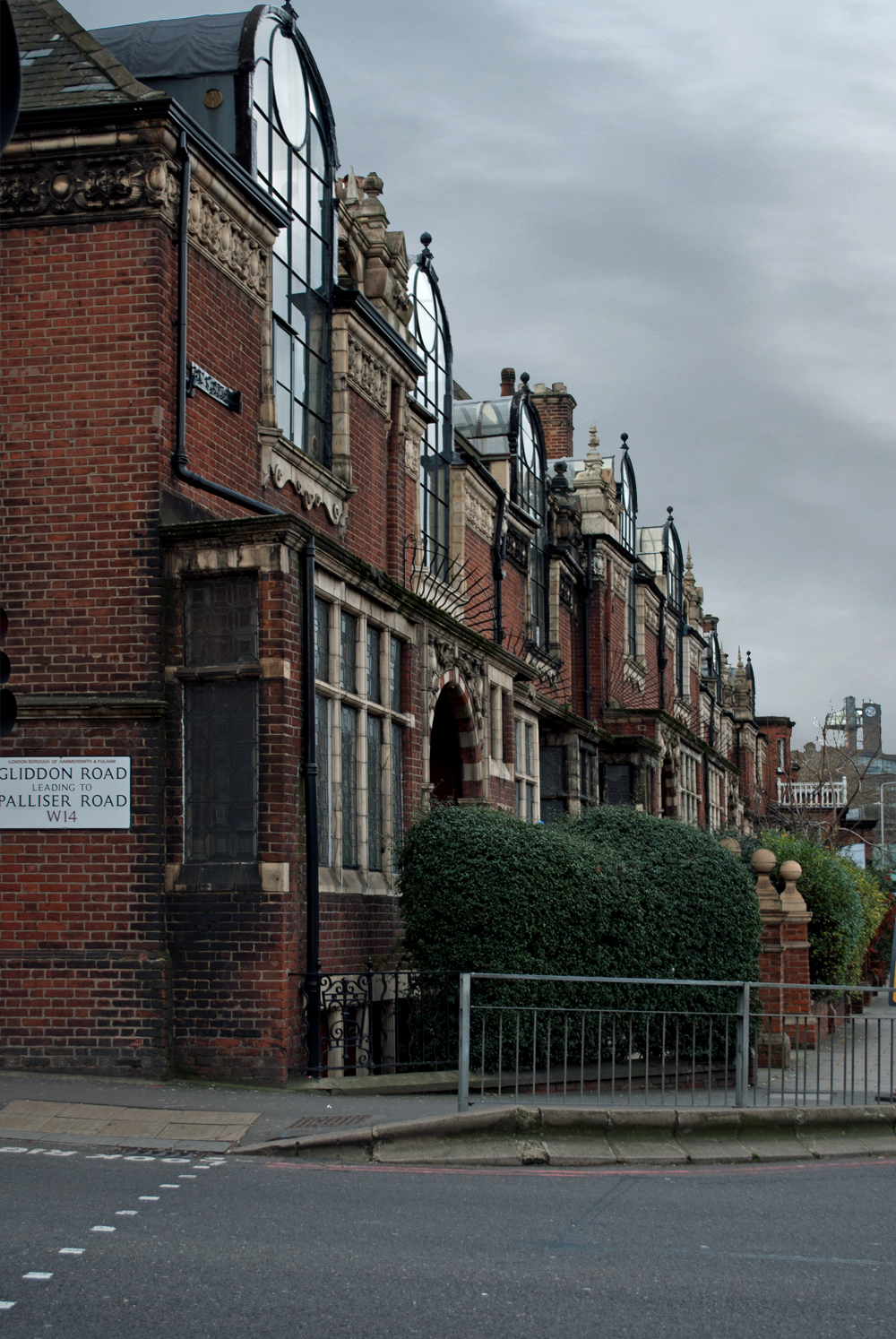
St Paul's Studios, Talgarth Road, listed Grade II (1890).

Frederick Wheeler (1853–1931) (FRIBA) was a British architect, born in Brixton, Surrey, in October 1853. Wheeler worked widely in South London and the Home Counties where he designed freely in the Art Nouveau, Queen Anne Revival and English Baroque styles which emerged at the end of the 19th Century

== Life and career ==
Wheeler was born in Brixton in 1853 to Christopher and Mary Ann Wheeler. He was articled to Charles Henry Driver (1832–1900), whose offices were at 7 Parliament Street, London SW1, and who is best known as the architect for the Victoria Embankment and Abbey Mills.

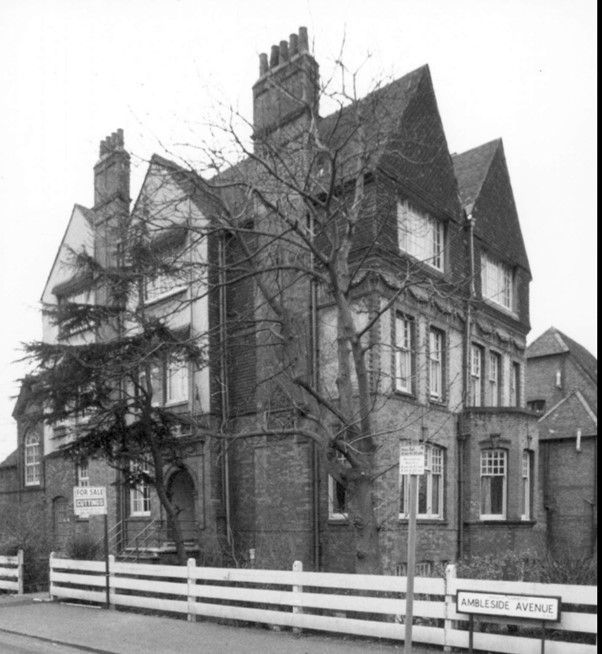
Sussex House, (1880)

Wheeler began his career as an architect working on a number of commissions in south London. In 1880 Sussex House, on the corner of Tooting Bec Gardens and Ambleside Avenue, was constructed as the Sussex House School (now residential). He designed a number of terraces around Mitcham Lane and Streatham station in what Pevsner calls a 'competent Queen Anne style'. At that time he favoured the use of dark red brick often carved into swags and floral designs. He was the architect for the 1880 Sussex House, on Garrads Rd, Wandsworth.

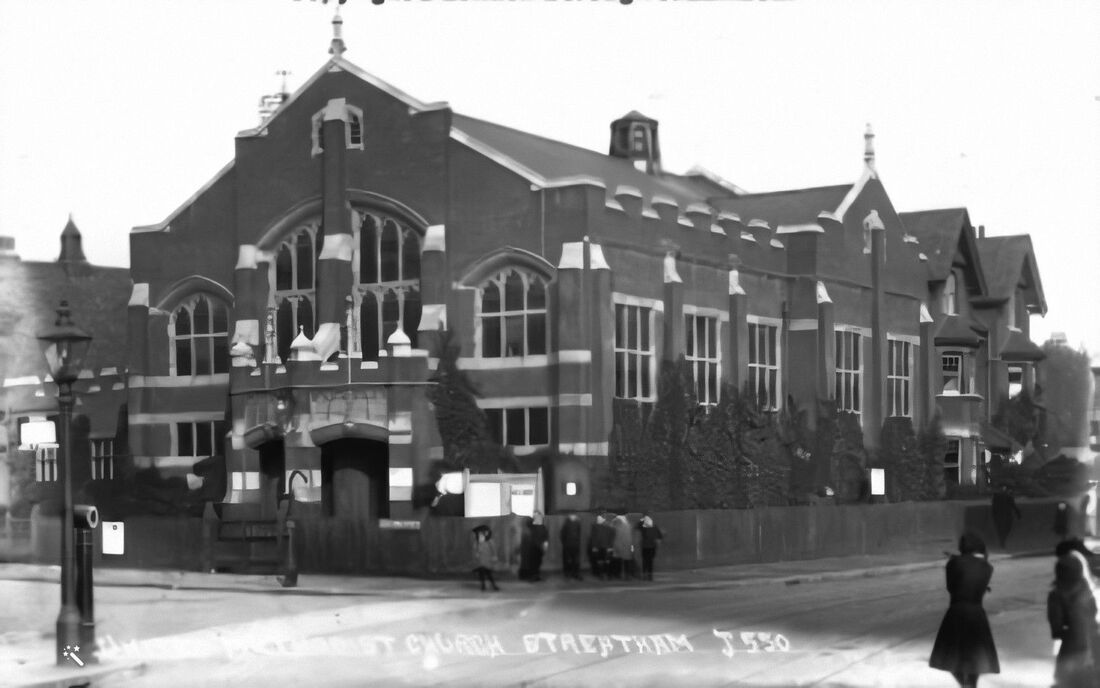
The Methodist Church at Riggindale Road, Streatham, (1900) listed grade II

During his time working in Streatham, Wheeler lived at 'Eversley’ (No. 9 Rydal Road) n the Woodlands Estate west of the Mitcham Lane, a housing development which he designed himself for the local building firm of Hill Brothers. While at Rydal Road he also designed the local Methodist Church in partnership with the architect Edward Speed. At the time of its construction it possessed the widest barrell vaulted ceiling in Britain and it is now listed at Grade II.

By 1891 Wheeler had moved with his wife Elizabeth (born in Dublin) to 21 Carfax, Horsham where, in 1897, he designed the Westminster bank in the town's main square. Over the next decade Wheeler would become a prolific architect of High Street Banks in Sussex towns including prominent surviving buildings in Chichester, Bognor Regis, Littlehampton and Pulborough. Wheeler worked largely in a free and exuberant Queen Anne style during this period.

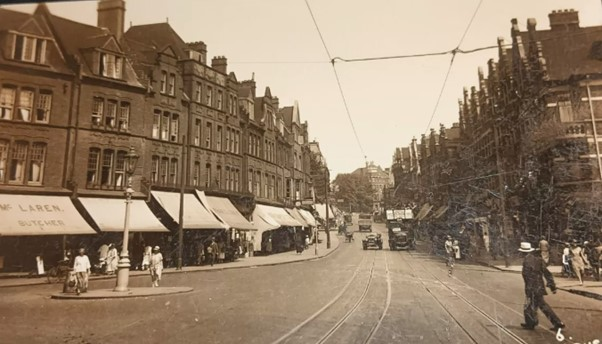
The Broadway and the Triangle Parades at Streatham (1885)

By 1895 Wheeler's office was at 22 Chancery Lane, London but he had also been present in Horsham since 1891 at the latest. Most of his major works during this period are in London, although he continued to design banks, houses and a community centre and library at Cowfold in Sussex. During this period Wheeler was also commissioned to design and build St James's church at Littlehampton in Sussex although it never reached the final state of Wheeler's projected plans. By 1899 Wheeler had entered into partnership with Percy Dean Lodge (who may have worked at Horsham only). From 1903, when this partnership was dissolved, until 1907 he was alone and then from 1907 to 1921 C R B Godman joined him and also his son, C W F Wheeler. Father and son remained partners after 1921 in London only.

== Major works ==
Wheeler's best known work is probably St Paul's Studios on Talgarth Road, London, W14, dating from 1890. St Paul's studios were built by Wheeler for James Fairless, a fine‑art publisher, to house bachelor artists. Wheeler had previously built a similar private house on the same street, at number 151, for Sir Coutts Lindsay, founder of the Grosvenor Gallery, which was the main showroom for artists of the aesthetic movement such as Whistler. Sir Edward Burne-Jones painted his last canvas there, and his son, also a painter, lived there for many years. The spaces for art and life at St Paul's Studios comprised three rooms on the ground floor, a studio 30 feet long and 22 ft wide (9.1 m × 6.7 m) with a 20-foot-high (6.1 m) ceiling on the top floor, and a basement flat (which was originally for the housekeeper).

The price of £220,000 was mentioned in a 1993 article on artists' studios in London.

In 2003, one of these studios was on the market at £1,100,000 – one thousand times the cost of its original construction. In 2007, another was on the market for £1,200,000.

In 1896 Wheeler designed an electricity transformer sub-station adjacent to the Roman Catholic church at the junction of Tooting Bec Gardens and Streatham High Road in Lambeth. It was built in coarse rubble with ashlar dressings in what is called a '15th century Gothic style' with large traceried windows. The building is listed but in 2025 it appears to be in a poor state of repair.

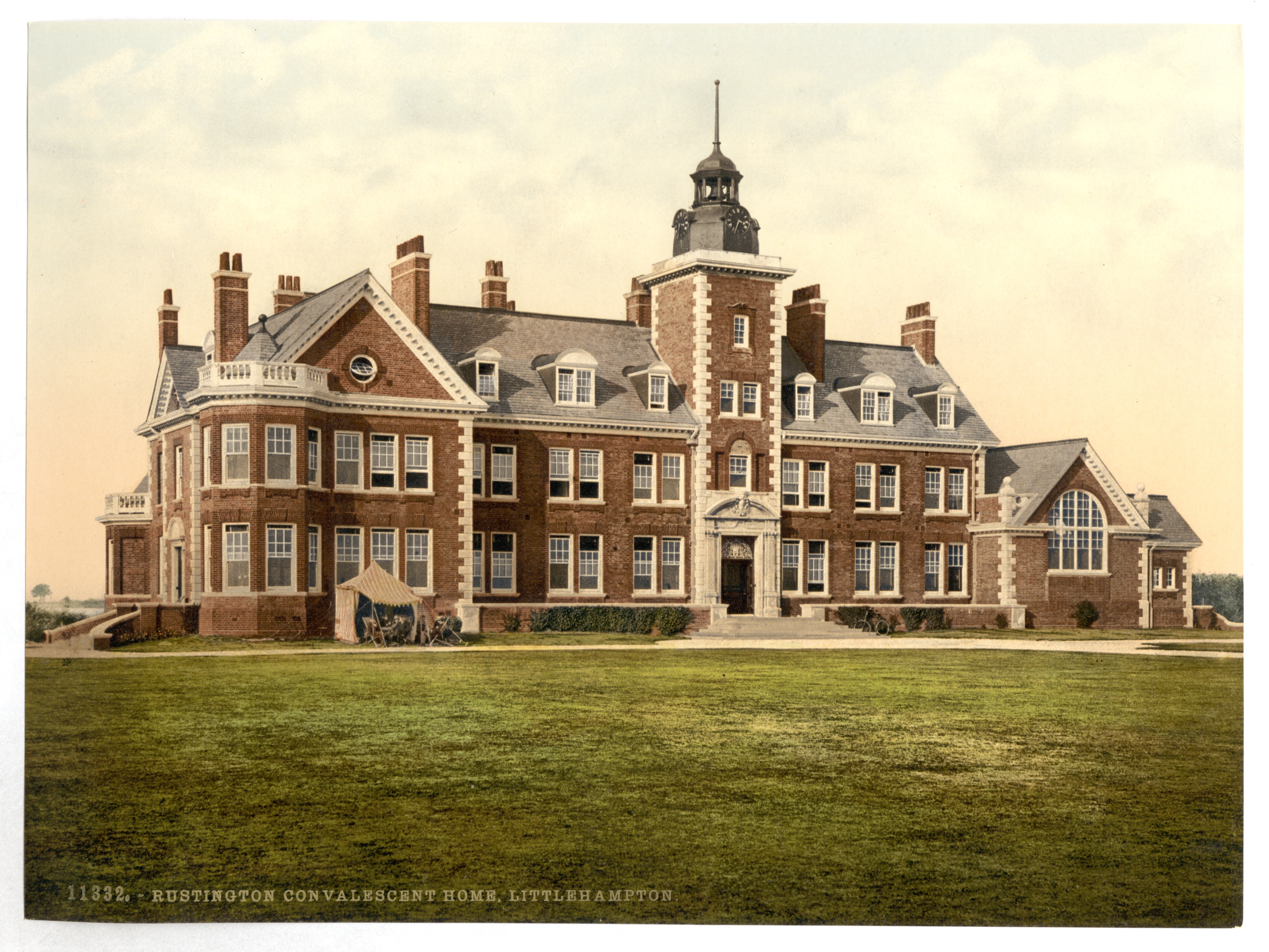
Rustington Convalescent Home, Littlehampton, 1897

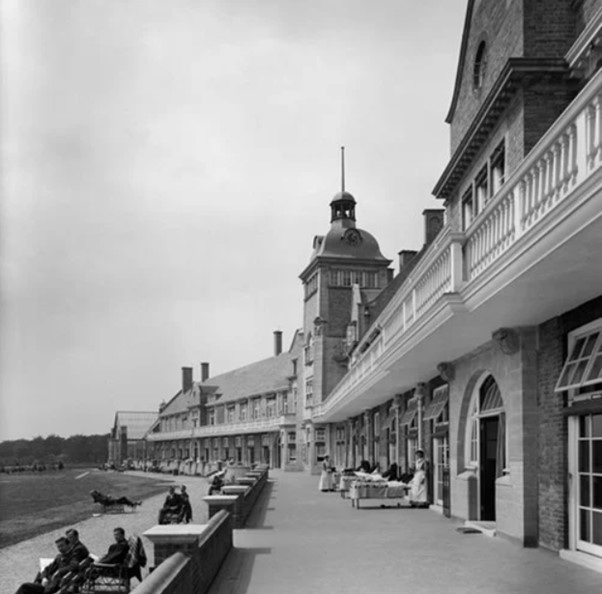
Mount Vernon Hospital Harefield (1902–04)

Also on Streatham High Road, Wheeler designed a number of grand shopping parades in the 1880s and 90s, one of the finest being The Triangle (Nos. 324–342) which has a dramatic roofline of Dutch gables, a curved fish-scale tiled roof to No. 324 and elevations of red brick with horizontal stone banding. Wheeler also designed the Broadway and the Queens Parade in Streatham as well as a parade of shops above the Green, exuberantly reordering the historic heart of the parish.

During his time in Streatham, Wheeler appears to have worked closely with a number of local buillders and developers and had a hand in a number of the distinctive Edwardian shop-house parades which sprung up across South West London at the end of the 19th Century. At Clapham Junction he worked for the developer Alfred Heaver and alongside the builder Thomas Spearing on the comprehensive redevlopment of the 'town centre' there. His work there includes the Queen's Parade running down Lavender Hill to the Falcon Pub on Bedford Road, Clapham Junction. Wheeler's designs also appear to have used the shopping district based along St John's Road, now the heart of the Clapham Junction Conservation Area. Wheeler also designed a number private houses in South West London including, for instance, 25 Sudbrooke Road, Clapham which he built for the Lithographer William Henry Cressy Hammond.

In 1897 Wheeler was commissioned by Sir Henry Harben, President of the Prudential Assurance Co. to design a convalescence home on the sea front at Rustington, Sussex. Pevsner describes this as '...dashing free-Wren design done with enough panache to give it a life of its own – a very good seaside building'. This is listed grade II.

As well as St Paul's Studios, one of Wheeler's finest, and largest, commissions was the Mount Vernon Hospital, Northwood, Middlesex (still intact) (1902–04) and an associated chapel (listed Grade II*) which incorporates Art Nouveau designs and motifs. This was commissioned by the London County Council as a replacement for the London Hospital for Consumption and Diseases of the Chest formerly at 7 Fitzroy Square, London W1. The chapel is now listed grade II* but in a poor state of repair.

== Later works ==
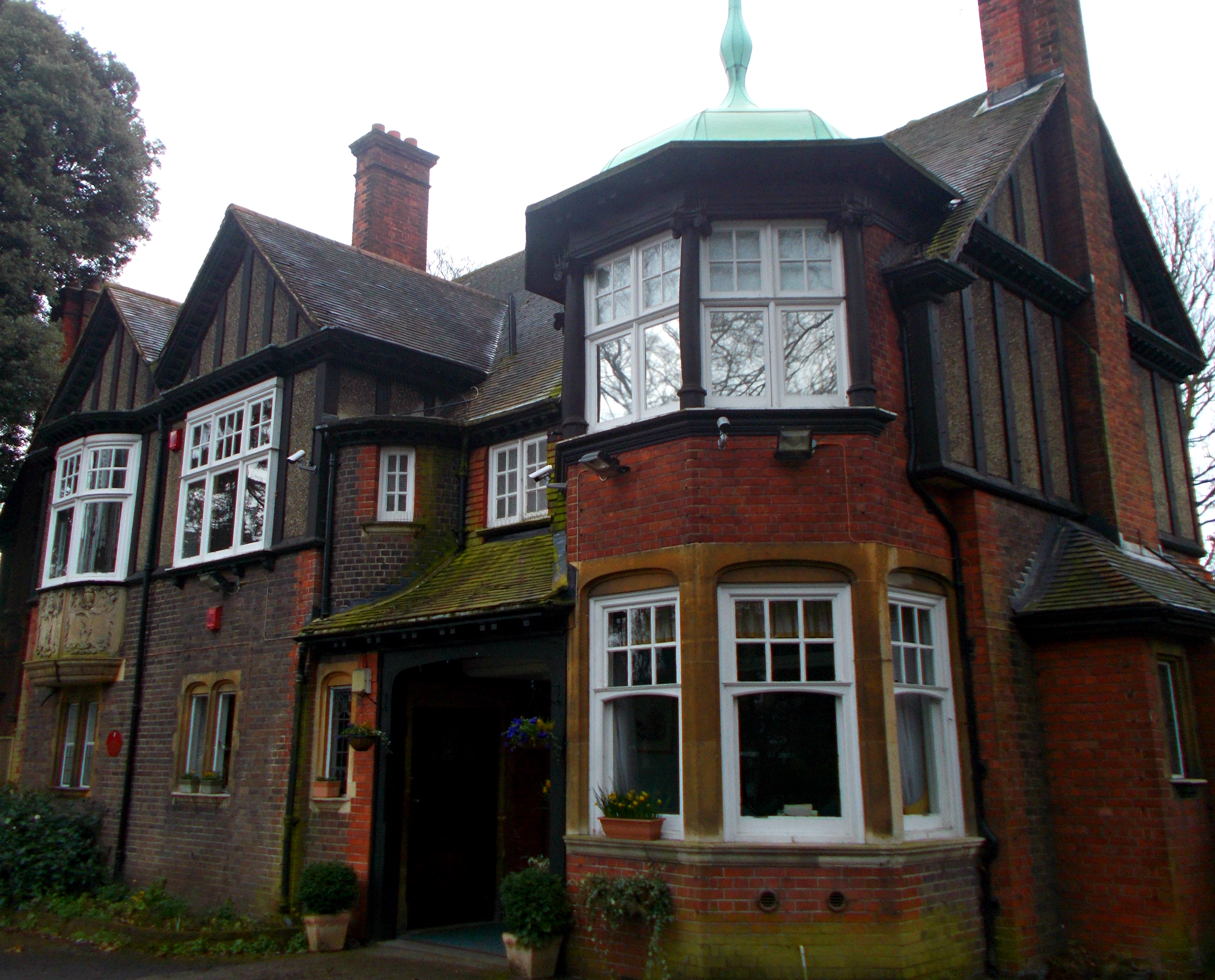
Russetings Worcester Road, Sutton (1899).

Whilst living for many years in Horsham, Wheeler also lived in Sutton at least from 1911 in Cambourne Road and in 1922 designed a new house for his family at Cotlands, 86 Mulgrave Road, Sutton, in a style which for the first time included influences of the Modern Movement. He died here in 1931. He clearly knew Sutton well because he also designed Russettings, a house for George Smith, in 1899, at 25 Worcester Road, Sutton, which is now the London Borough of Sutton's Registry Office. He was also responsible for a Westminster Bank in Sutton Court Road in 1902 and the Sutton Adult School, Benhill Avenue, Sutton, commissioned in 1909 by Thomas Wall, a local benefactor and CEO of the family's company: ice cream and sausage manufacturer.

== Boer War Memorials ==
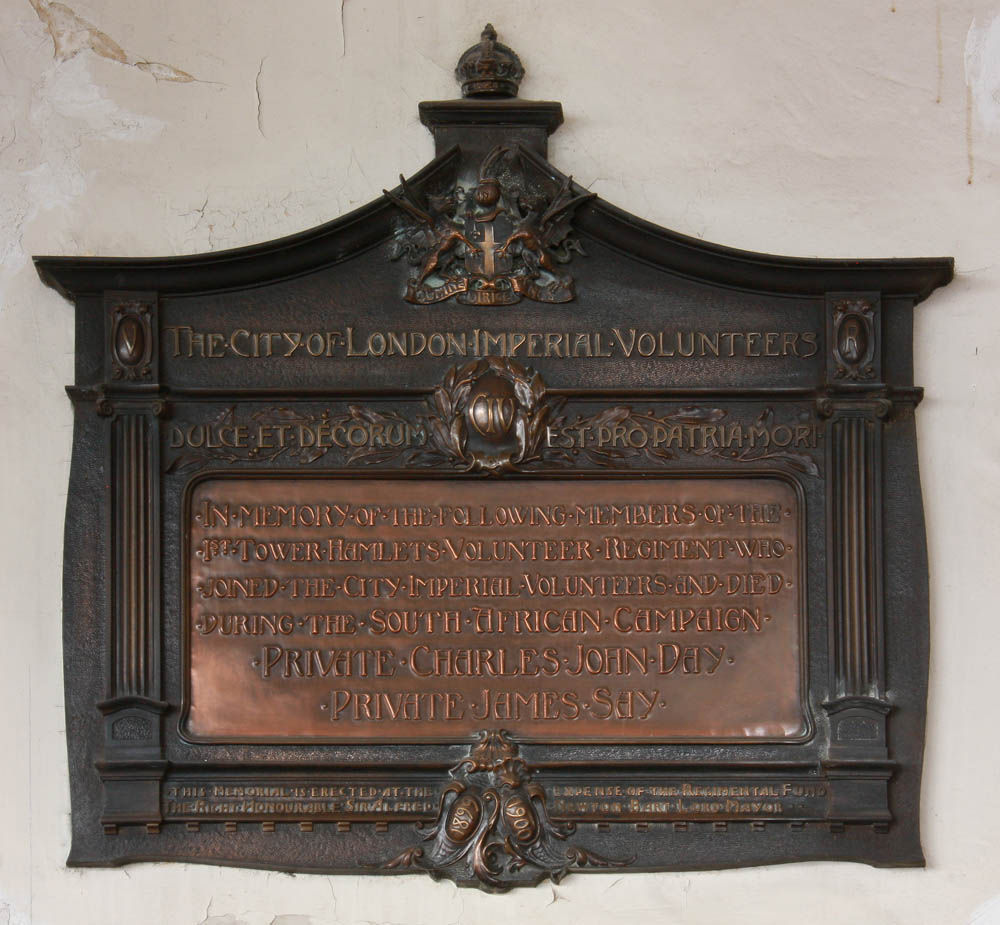
Wheelers pattern design for a Boer War Memorial to the City of London Imperial Volunteers

After the conclusion of the Second Boer War in 1902 Wheeler was commissioned to create the pattern of the memorial to be used generally in commemoration the dead of the City of London Imperial Volunteers in that conflict. Working with the Coalbrookedale Foundry he conceived the form of a cast bronze plaque with columnal sides bearing the names of the dead in raised lettering. At the curved top of the plaque are the City of London arms below a small plinth supporting the crown and the inscription Dulce Et Decorum Est Pro Patria Mori, while on either side of the tablet are the letters VR (Victoria Regina).

Wheeler's memorials now hang in a large number of Churches and Synagogues across London and the Home Counties including at Westminster Abbey, St Giles in the Fields Church, St Leonards Church Shoreditch, St Pancras New Church and the Lauderdale Road Spanish & Portuguese Synagogue among many others. The inclusion of the names of the fallen, even those of the lower ranks, was a great departure in the history of memorialisation and can perhaps be said to have set the form for memorials which would follow the Great War.

== Other buildings by Wheeler's practice ==
Altered/extended: Holy Innocents Church, Southwater, West Sussex, was built in 1848 to a design by James Park Harrison (1817–1902) of London. In 1909 work commenced on the construction of a new vestry to the south of the chancel in accordance with plans prepared by local architects, Wheeler & Godman. The work cost £280, of which £200 was donated by the Fletcher family, and was completed in 1910.

Horsham
The Carfax 1898

Rustington
convalescent home 1897

== Partners ==
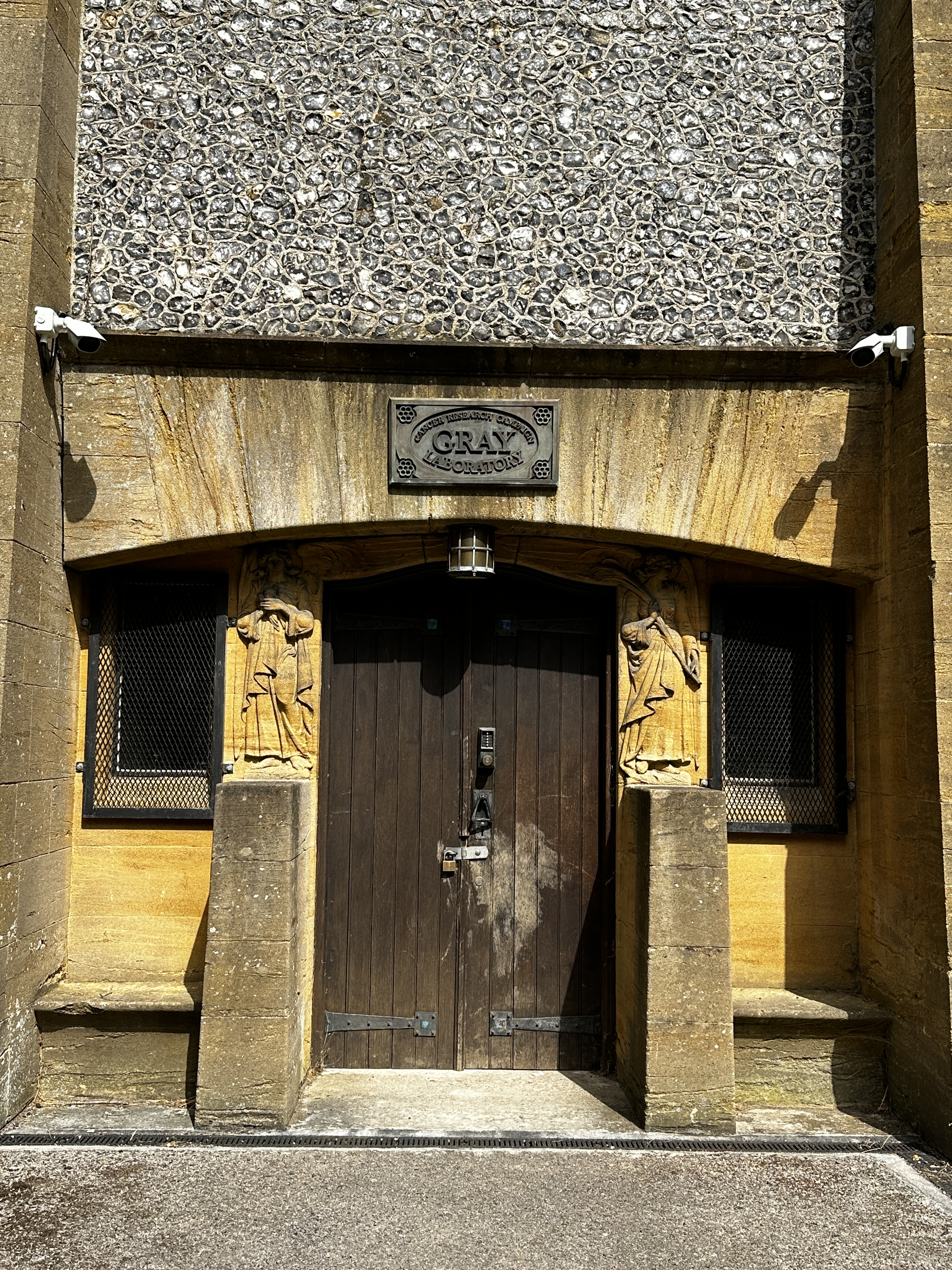
Entrance to Wheelers Art Nouveau Chapel at Mount Vernon, listed grade II* (1902–04)

Charles Richard Bayly Godman (1879–1946) was from 1907 the partner of Wheeler and his son, William Trevor Wheeler, in Horsham. By 1921 both Wheelers were in London and the partnership was dissolved. From then until his death Godman's partner was Claude John Kay (b.1878), Wheeler's former assistant. They built many banks and houses. His grandson Stephen Attwood Trevor Wheeler was also an established architect, responsible for many shopping arcades, cinemas, banks and some grand and multiple occupancy houses in Surrey.
