= Gertrude Demain Hammond =

British painter and children's book illustrator

- Born: 1862; Brixton, London, England
- Died: 21 July 1952 (aged 89–90); Worthing, Sussex, England

Gertrude Demain Hammond or Mrs. McMurdie (1862 – 21 July 1952) was a British painter and children's book illustrator.

Hammond was born in Brixton. She is known for graphic design and typography, and exhibited from 1886 in London at the Royal Academy and Suffolk Street. Her 1904 work Memories was included in the 1905 book Women Painters of the World.

== Personal life ==
Gertrude Demain Hammond was born in London, England in 1862. She was one of three children, all of whom became artists. Gertrude herself was an illustrator who worked in black-and-white and watercolors, her older sister Christiana was a successful pen illustrator, and her younger brother Percy was a stained-glass artist. Being the child of a banker’s clerk, Gertrude was afforded the opportunity to study at the Lambeth School of Art and at the Royal Academy Schools. In 1898 she married Henry McMurdie, but this did not put an end to her artistic career. She continued to display and publish her artwork under her unmarried name. The couple resided at St. Paul’s Studios in Hammersmith, West London, which was known at the time to be something of an artists’ colony.

== Career ==
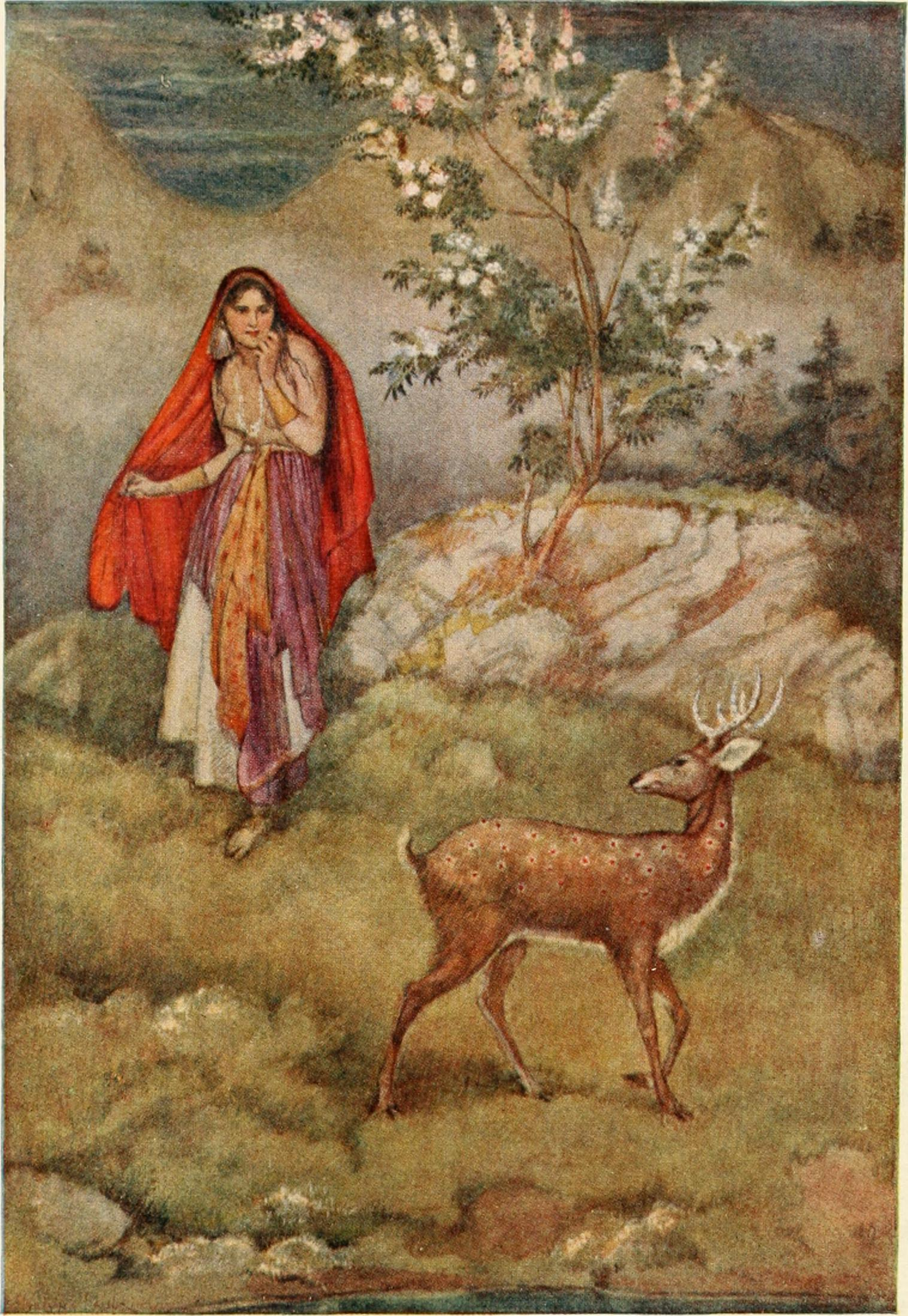
An illustration from Stories of India's Gods and Heroes (1911)

Hammond supported herself through black-and-white illustrations by contributing to a plethora of London journals such as The Yellow Book, and illustrated for literary works of Shakespeare, Charles Dickens, and Edmund Spenser. Hammond’s vision was consistent along with other painter-illustrators around the turn of the century, and was shaped by the medievalising style brought about by the Pre-Raphaelites. Hammond was a frequent exhibitor at Royal Institute of Painters in Water Colours. (Note: Hammond exhibited as follows: 34 works at the Walker Art Gallery, Liverpool, six works at the Manchester City Art Gallery, 21 works at the Royal Academy, four works at the Royal Society of British Artists, one work at the Royal Hibernian Academy, and 142 works at the Royal Institute of Painters in Water Colours.)

In her career, Hammond struggled with gender inequality. She would often sign her illustrations as “G. Demain Hammond” in an attempt to receive fair payment for her work. Her sister did the same thing, signing her work under “Chris Hammond” instead of Christiana. In 1892, the sisters were a part of the few female illustrators for The Idler. A year later, the magazine was taken over by Jerome K. Jerome, who stopped giving commissions to women all together. Hammond also commented on this discrimination of the time through some of her artwork. In her 1903 watercolor A Reading From Plato, Hammond depicts an aristocratic woman pondering the language of Plato, possibly contemplating philosophy, political theory, metaphysics, or other ideas that were ordinarily thought to be masculine subjects. At the time that this painting was created, British women did not have the right to vote, and would not be granted it for another 25 years.

Hammond was a British painter and a children’s book illustrator, and contributed to many works throughout her career. One children’s book she helped illustrate was Velma Bourgeois Richmond’s Shakespeare as Children's Literature: Edwardian Retellings in Words and Pictures, which aimed to make Shakespeare’s literature more accessible for children, therefore encouraging them to take an interest in the humanities and art of reading.

Gertrude’s paintings and illustrations consisted of mainly portraits, interior genre scenes, and literary subjects, all done in watercolor. She was given the opportunity to exhibit at the Royal Academy and the Royal Institute of Painters in Water-Colors where she presented Youth’s Spring-Tribute. This graphic watercolor illustrated Youth’s Spring-Tribute, from a sequence of poems, The House of Life, by Dante Gabriel Rossetti, in 1881. This watercolor was then reproduced in a publication of an Edwardian birthday book in 1905, The Beautiful Birthday Book, replicating watercolors by Hammond.

== Publications ==
- The Story of Hereward - The Champion of England, novel by Douglas C. Steadman B.A., illustrated by Gertrude Demain Hammond R.I., pub. 1908 by George G. Harrap and Co.
- Stories From The Faerie Queene Retold From Spenser, novel by Laurence H. Dawson, illustrated by Gertrude Demain Hammond, pub. 1911-1912 by McClelland & Goodchild Limited Publishers.
- Hero-Myths and Legends of the British Race, novel by M.I. Ebbutt, illustrated by J.H.F. Bacon, Gertrude Demain Hammond, W.H. Margetson, Byam Shaw, and Patten Wilson, pub. 1910 by Thomas Y. Crowell.
- Jasper: A Story for Children, novel by Mrs. Molesworth, illustrated by Gertrude Demain Hammond, pub. 1906 by London: Macmillan and Co.
- The Spell, novel by William Dana Orcutt, illustrated by Gertrude Demain Hammond, pub. 1909 by Harper & Brothers Publishers.
- Tales From Shakespeare, novel by Charles Lamb and Mary Lamb, illustrated by Gertrude Demain Hammond, pub. 1878 by New York: Thomas Y. Crowell.
- Arethusa, novel by F. Marion Crawford, illustrated by Gertrude Demain Hammond, pub. 1907 by New York, London, Macmillan.
- Faeries Afield, novel by Mrs. Molesworth, illustrated by Gertrude Demain Hammond, pub. 1911 by London; Macmillan and Co.
- A Girl in Springtime, novel by Jessie Mansergh, illustrated by Gertrude Demain Hammond, pub. 1897 by Blackie and Son Limited, London.
- Shakespeare’s Stories of the English Kings, novel by Thomas Thellusson, illustrated by Gertrude Demain Hammond, pub. 1912 by London: G.G. Harrap.
- Two Maiden Aunts, novel by Mary H. Debenham, illustrated by Gertrude Demain Hammond, pub. 1895 by New York: Thomas Whittaker.
- The Beautiful Birthday Book, illustrated by Gertrude Demain Hammond, pub. 1905 by A & C Black, London.
- Complete Works of George Eliot, novel by George Eliot, illustrated by Gertrude Demain Hammond and Frederick L. Stoddard, pub. 1908 by London: Postlethwaite, Taylor & Knowles, Ltd.
- The Personal History of David Copperfield, novel by Charles Dickens, illustrated by Gertrude Demain Hammond, pub. 1921 by New York : Dodd, Mead.
- Fairies of Sorts, novel by Mrs. Molesworth, illustrated by Gertrude Demain Hammond, pub. 1908 by London: Macmillan and Company.
- Dimsie Moves Up Again, story by Dorita Fairlie Bruce, illustrated by Gertrude Demain Hammond, pub. 1925 by Humphrey Milford, Oxford University Press.
