= Ernest Gébler =

Irish writer (1914–1998)

Ernest Gébler (31 December 1914 – 26 January 1998), sometimes credited as Ernie Gebler, was an Irish writer of Czech origin. He was a member of Aosdána.

== Early life ==
Gébler was born in Dublin, one of the five children of Adolf (or Adolphe) Gébler, a shopkeeper and musician of Czech Jewish origin who had married a Dublin theatre usherette. The family moved to Wolverhampton in 1925. In 1930 Adolf got a job with a Dublin light opera company and Ernest followed the rest of the family there in 1931. Ernest worked backstage in the Gate Theatre in the 1930s.

== Later career ==
After his writing career took off with his first novel in 1946, Gébler enjoyed greater success with his novel The Plymouth Adventure (1950), which was made into a Hollywood film. He was first married to Leatrice Gilbert (1924–2015), daughter of the actors John Gilbert and Leatrice Joy, whom he met in Hollywood. The couple moved to Ireland, got married and were divorced in 1951 and she returned to America.

In Dublin in 1952 Gébler met future novelist Edna O'Brien, then working in a pharmacist's shop. After opposition from O'Brien's family, they moved to England, married in 1954, and made their home at Lake Park House, overlooking Lough Dan, in Co Wicklow. They had two sons, Karl (later Carlo) and Sasha, who became respectively a writer and an architect. The house was sold in 1955 to the poet Richard Murphy. It was Gébler who introduced O'Brien to her first publisher, Iain Hamilton of Hutchinson. Her literary career eclipsed Gébler's after her début novel The Country Girls in 1960.

== Late personal life ==
The couple separated in 1964 and divorced in 1968, with O'Brien eventually gaining sole custody of the children. Both O'Brien and Carlo Gébler later wrote about Ernest's cruelty to the family. Gébler returned to Dublin in 1970, but also owned farmland near Lough Owel, and became friendly with his neighbour J. P. Donleavy.

After a fall at home, Gébler was taken into care and his house in the Dublin suburb of Dalkey was sold. He spent the last seven years of his life at Grove Nursing Home in Killiney, Dublin, where he died in 1998 of a bronchial infection, after several years with Alzheimer's disease. He was 83.

== Works ==
Works by Ernest Gébler
Title	Type	Year	Notes	Refs
He Had My Heart Scalded	novel	1946 (Note: WorldCat and Carlo Gebler say 1946; Donnelly incorrectly says 1944.)		
The Voyage of the Mayflower	novel	1950	Historical novel based on the 1620 Mayflower voyage. Sold five million copies. Filmed in 1952 as Plymouth Adventure starring Spencer Tracy	
She Sits Smiling	play	1954	Premièred at the Pike Theatre	
A Week in the Country	novel	1957		
The Love Investigator	novel	1960		
Eileen O'Roon	play			
Why Aren't You Famous?	teleplay	1966	For the BBC. Adapted from his play Eileen O'Roon. A German version was broadcast in 1969.	
Where Will I find what will Change my Life?	teleplay	1966		
Call Me Daddy	teleplay	1967	"Armchair Theatre" episode on ABC broadcast 8 April 1967. Edited by Terence Feely and directed by Alvin Rakoff. Won the 1968 International Emmy for Entertainment. Expanded into his novel Shall I Eat You Now?. A German version was broadcast in 1970. Staged at the Project Arts Centre in 1975.	
The Old Man and the Girl	novel	1968		
A Little Milk of Human Kindness	teleplay	1968	For London Weekend Television	
Women Can be Monsters	teleplay	1968	"The Wednesday Play" on BBC One, 27 November 1968. Produced by Thames Television	
Shall I Eat You Now?	novel	1969	Based on his teleplay Call Me Daddy. Released in the US as Hoffman, and filmed in 1970 also as Hoffman.	
Hoffman	screenplay	1970	Based on his novel Shall I Eat You Now?	
A Cry for Help	play	1975	Premièred at the Peacock Theatre, Dublin	
The Spaniards in Galway	play			
