= Chang and Eng (disambiguation) =

Chang and Eng Bunker (1811–1874) were conjoined twin brothers known as the "Siamese twins".

Chang and Eng

- Chang & Eng, a Singaporean musical, debuted 1997, based on the above twins
- Chang & Eng (novel), a 2000 novel by Darin Strauss
