= Ming Wong =

Singaporean contemporary artist

Ming Wong (黄汉明)
- Born: Singapore
- Education: Diploma in Fine Arts (Nanyang Academy of Fine Arts, 1995); MFA (Slade School of Fine Art, University College London, 1999)
- Known for: Video art, film, installation art, performance art
- Movement: Contemporary art
- Awards: 2009: Special Mention (Expanding Worlds), 53rd Venice Biennale
- Website: http://www.mingwong.org/

Ming Wong (Chinese: 黄汉明; pinyin: Huáng Hànmíng) is a Singaporean contemporary artist who lives and works in Berlin, known for his re-interpretations of iconic films and performances from world cinema in his video installations, often featuring "miscastings" of himself in roles of varied identities.

In 2009, at the Singapore Pavilion of the 53rd Venice Biennale, Wong represented Singapore with the body of work, Life of Imitation, for which he was awarded the Special Mention (Expanding Worlds) during the Biennale's Opening Ceremony, the first time a Singaporean artist would receive an award at the Venice Biennale.

Wong is currently a Professor in Performance in the Expanded Field at Royal Institute of Art in Stockholm.

== Education and personal life ==
From 1992, he was trained in Chinese calligraphy at Nanyang Academy of Fine Arts, Singapore, obtaining his Diploma in Fine Arts (Chinese Art) in 1995. Wong would write plays in school, also doing amateur drama. In the late-1990s, Ming Wong began work in theatre, later leaving for London to study at the Slade School of Fine Art, University College London from 1997 to 1999, where he obtained his Master of Fine Arts (Fine Art Media). Wong remained in London after graduation, where he continued to produce video works. After spending 10 years in London since 1997, Wong's time there would be cut short by rising costs of living, and in 2007 he would move to Berlin where he currently lives and works.

== Career ==
=== Beginnings ===
Following his graduation from the Nanyang Academy of Fine Arts in 1995, Wong worked in Singapore's English-language theatre scene, writing the book for the 1997 musical Chang & Eng, a dramatised narrative of the lives of nineteenth century Thai-born conjoined twin brothers who inspired the term "Siamese twins." The musical was a critical and commercial success for Singapore, touring Asia in the late 1990s, eventually becoming the first English-language musical to be performed in China.

While Wong started becoming known for his work on Chang & Eng, he would leave for London to continue his studies in art. Following his graduation in 1999, Wong would remain in London, continuing to exhibit and produce video works such as Ham&cheeseomelet (2001) and Whodunnit? (2003/04), pieces that reimagined William Shakespeare's Hamlet and British murder mysteries respectively. In 2007, Wong would move to Berlin for the one-year Künstlerhaus Bethanien residency. He would continue to work and live there while exhibiting internationally in locations such as Spain, the Netherlands, and Australia, and at venues such as the Museum of Contemporary Art Taipei, Taiwan, the NUS Museum, Singapore, or at events such as the Jakarta Biennale 2009.

=== Life of Imitation at the Venice Biennale 2009 ===
Wong would eventually be selected to represent Singapore for the 53rd Venice Biennale in 2009. At the Singapore Pavilion in Palazzo Michiel del Brusà, Cannaregio, curated by Tang Fu Kuen, Wong exhibited the body of work, Life of Imitation, a reference to the Douglas Sirk film, Imitation of Life. The palazzo was made to echo a cinema, with billboards by cinema billboard painter Neo Chon Teck 'advertising' the three featured video installations: Four Malay Stories (2005); In Love for the Mood (2009); and Life of Imitation (2009), alongside invited artworks by cine-memorabilia collector Wong Han Min, and filmmaker Sherman Ong. Together, the body of works examined the complexities of ethnic, racial, and linguistic identities across geographies, histories, and cultures as represented through cinema. For instance, the video installation, Life of Imitation (2009), featured three actors that corresponded to the three main ethnic groups in Singapore (Chinese, Malay, and Indian), each alternating roles to play both a black mother and her 'white' daughter, particularly in a scene where the latter is fervently denying her roots.

Wong would be awarded the Special Mention (Expanding Worlds) during the Biennale's Opening Ceremony, the first time a Singaporean artist would receive an award at the Venice Biennale. The exhibition would later be re-presented at the Singapore Art Museum in 2010, and later at the Frye Art Museum in Seattle, Washington, USA, CAST Gallery in Tasmania, Australia, and Hara Museum of Contemporary Art in Tokyo, Japan in 2011.

=== 2010 to present ===
Wong would continue exhibiting internationally following Life of Imitation at the Venice Biennale, showing at the Sydney Biennale and the Gwangju Biennale in 2010. In 2011, he would also show at Performa 11, New York and the 3rd Singapore Biennale. In 2012, Wong would participate in the Liverpool Biennial, UK, and the Toronto International Film Festival, Canada with his project Making Chinatown, which was first shown at his solo exhibition Ming Wong: Making Chinatown at the REDCAT in Los Angeles, USA the same year. In 2013, he would show at the Lyon Biennale, France, and hold solo shows at the Shiseido Gallery in Tokyo, Japan, and the University of Oregon, USA. In 2014, he would show a new commissioned piece, Windows On The World (Part 2), at the 10th Shanghai Biennale Social Factory. Wong would hold a solo exhibition, Next Year, at the UCCA Center for Contemporary Art, Beijing in 2015. In 2016, Wong would participate in the 8th Asia Pacific Triennial of Contemporary Art (APT8).

In 2017, Wong would exhibit work at the Museum of Contemporary Art Taipei, Taiwan for Spectrosynthesis - Asian LGBTQ Issues and Art Now, a major survey show of LGBTQ art in Asia. In 2019, the show travelled to Bangkok Art and Culture Centre, Thailand as Spectrosynthesis II, the largest show of LGBTQ art from Southeast Asia, and Wong performed in drag for Land of a Thousand Rainbows, a performance commissioned for the exhibition's opening.

In 2018, he would show at a guest exhibition as part of DAK’ART 2018 Dakar Biennale, Senegal, curated by Cosmin Costinas and Inti Guerrero, produced by Para Site, also showing new work at the Busan Biennale, curated by Jörg Heiser and Cristina Ricupero, the same year. In 2019, Wong would participate in the 2019 Asian Art Biennial, The Strangers from beyond the Mountain and the Sea, curated by Taiwanese artist Hsu Chia-wei and Singaporean artist Ho Tzu Nyen.

== Art ==
Wong's work often features performances of various characters and identities from world cinema, which the artist views as a form of drag. Dubbed as a form of "pla(y)giarism" by writer Kathy Acker, Wong often plays all the roles, male and female, as a means of re-examining the Western cinematic canon as a queer Asian man. Wong has examined the visual tropes and conventions from the oeuvres of directors such as Rainer Werner Fassbinder, Wong Kar-wai, Luchino Visconti, Pier Paolo Pasolini, P. Ramlee, Douglas Sirk, Ingmar Bergman, and Roman Polanski; his practice thus examining the construction of subjectivity and geography through filmic representation.

=== Four Malay Stories (2005) ===
A four-channel video installation, Four Malay Stories (2005) saw Wong selecting four of the most popular films from esteemed Malaysian filmmaker P. Ramlee's oeuvre, re-interpreting them by being filmed playing all 16 characters in full costume. Wong's poor command of the Malay language is foregrounded, with the artist attempting his lines several times in repeated takes of the same scene. Edited to simulate being shot on black-and-white film stock, the subtitles show a transcription of the artist's lines in Malay, alongside a literal English translation. The "foreign presence" of Wong within these films re-examine the nation's narratives of multiculturalism, highlighting the stereotypes and cinematic tropes in the history of Singapore's national cinema. The work further evokes the loss of Singapore's cinema heritage through its references to the golden era of the Malay film industry from the 1950s to 1960s, also highlighting the shifting politics of language in Singapore.

Four Malay Stories was later re-presented during Wong's Life of Imitation exhibition at the Singapore Pavilion in Venice Biennale 2009.

== Achievements ==
=== Awards ===
At the 53rd Venice Biennale in 2009, Wong was awarded the Special Mention (Expanding Worlds), the first time Singapore received an award at the art biennale. Later in 2012, Wong would be conferred the Award of the Distinguished Alumni Medal from Nanyang Academy of Fine Arts, Singapore, 2012, and in 2014, Wong was awarded the Federal State of Berlin government grant for artists.

=== Residencies and Fellowships ===
From 2003 to 2005, Wong was conferred the Pearson Creative Research Fellowship at the British Library, UK. He was awarded the Fire Station Residency and Bursary by ACME Studios, UK in 2005, and he was artist-in-residence at Künstlerhaus Bethanien in Berlin, Germany from 2007 to 2008.
