= Martin Pousson =

American novelist, poet, and professor (born 1966)

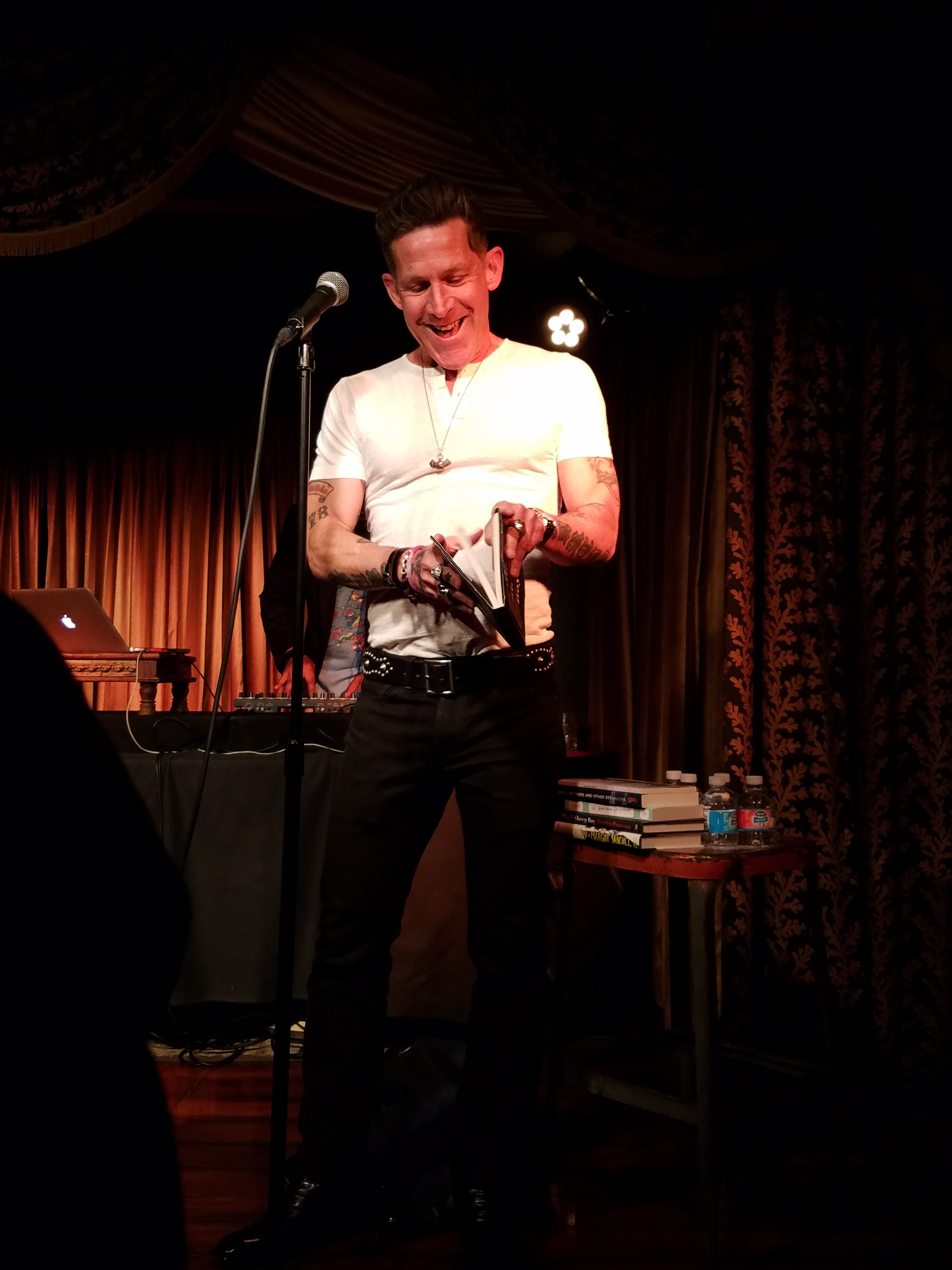
- Pousson reads from his novel at Dirty Laundry Lit (2017)
- Born: April 13, 1966 (age 60); Crowley, Louisiana, U.S.
- Education: Loyola University New Orleans (BA); Columbia University (MFA)
- Occupations: Novelist; poet; professor
- Writing career
- Genres: Fiction, Poetry
- Literary movement: Southern literature, Cajun literature, Gay and Lesbian literature

Martin Pousson (born April 13, 1966) is an American novelist, poet, and professor.

== Early life and education ==
He was born and raised in Louisiana, in the Cajun bayou land of Acadiana. He received a B.A. from Loyola University New Orleans in 1987 and an M.F.A. from Columbia University in 1999. Some of his favorite writers include James Baldwin, Carson McCullers, and Truman Capote, as well as John Rechy.

== Career ==
His first novel, No Place, Louisiana (2002), was published by Riverhead Books, and it tells the story of a Cajun family, a troubled marriage, and an American dream gone wrong set in Louisiana's bayou country. The novel was praised by Pulitzer Prize-winner Michael Cunningham and was acclaimed in reviews by The Advocate, Publishers Weekly, New York Daily News, The Boston Globe, and the Los Angeles Times. No Place, Louisiana was a finalist for the John Gardner Fiction Book Award.

His first collection of poetry, Sugar (2005), was published by Suspect Thoughts Press, and it centers on the lives of outsiders, especially Cajuns and queers. Some of the poems deal with racism and the AIDS epidemic. The collection was praised by Alfred Corn and Jake Shears, and it was named a finalist for the Lambda Literary Awards in 2006. He says that this collection would not have ever been published if it were not for a friend's saved copy of the manuscript.

In 2005, he was named one of the Leading Men of the Year by Instinct magazine, alongside Jake Shears and Keith Boykin.

In 2014, he won a National Endowment for the Arts Fellowship in Creative Writing.

His second novel, Black Sheep Boy (2017), was published by Rare Bird Books. A PEN America/PEN Center USA limited edition was published in paperback by Rare Bird Books in 2018. Black Sheep Boy tells the story of Boo, a queer mixed-race boy, the son of a Creole mother and a Cajun father, set in the bayous of Louisiana. The coming-of-age novel is told in thirteen stories, ranging from horror to fantasy and magic realism. Boo faces homophobia and other traumas at home, in school, and also in gay bars. Some of the stories involve Boo with drag queens and transgender activists. Other stories involve Boo with werewolves, skinwalkers, and voodoo traiteurs. A selection of the stories won a National Endowment for the Arts Fellowship. Black Sheep Boy was praised by the Los Angeles Times, The Millions, and Lambda Literary, as well as by the writers Justin Torres, Aimee Bender and Chris Abani. Stories from the novel were anthologized in Lethe Press's Best Gay Stories and Best Gay Speculative Fiction. Black Sheep Boy was featured on NPR's The Reading Life, as a Los Angeles Times Literary Pick, and as a Book Riot Must-Read Indie Press Book. In 2017, Black Sheep Boy won the PEN America/PEN Center USA Literary Award for Fiction. In 2018, Black Sheep Boy was a shortlist finalist for the Joyce Carol Oates Prize / Simpson Family Literary Prize.

His stories, poems, and essays have appeared in The Advocate, Antioch Review, Cimarron Review, Eclectica Magazine, Epoch, Five Points, Gay City Anthology, Los Angeles Review of Books, The Louisiana Review, New Orleans Review, NPR's The Reading Life, Parnassus, The Rattling Wall, The Rumpus, StoryQuarterly, and TriQuarterly. In 2019, his Walt Whitman tribute poem, "Uncivil War," was a Pushcart Prize nominee.

In the late 1980s and early 1990s, he worked in San Francisco as an AIDS activist with ACT UP and Project Open Hand and as an LGBTQ activist with Queer Nation. In 1993, at Loyola University New Orleans, he founded Out/Here, the first LGBTQ student organization on a Southern Jesuit campus. In 2007 at California State University, Northridge, he was a founding faculty member for one of the earliest Queer Studies Programs in the United States. He also led the drive for the first Pride Center at California State University, Northridge serving as LGBTQ Faculty Liaison, LGBTQA Faculty Advisor, Queer Ambassadors Faculty Advisor, and Advisor for the 2012 National Queer People of Color Conference.

He has taught at Columbia University in New York City, at Rutgers University in New Jersey and at Loyola University New Orleans. He is currently a Professor of English at California State University, Northridge, in Los Angeles. He teaches in the Creative Writing Program and the Queer Studies Program, and some of his most popular courses include Narrative Writing, Advanced Narrative Writing, Theories of Fiction, and Gay Male Writers. At California State University, Northridge he won the Outstanding Creative Accomplishment Award, the Jerome Richfield Scholar Award, and the Excellence in Teaching Award.
