= Danielle Evans (writer) =

American fiction writer

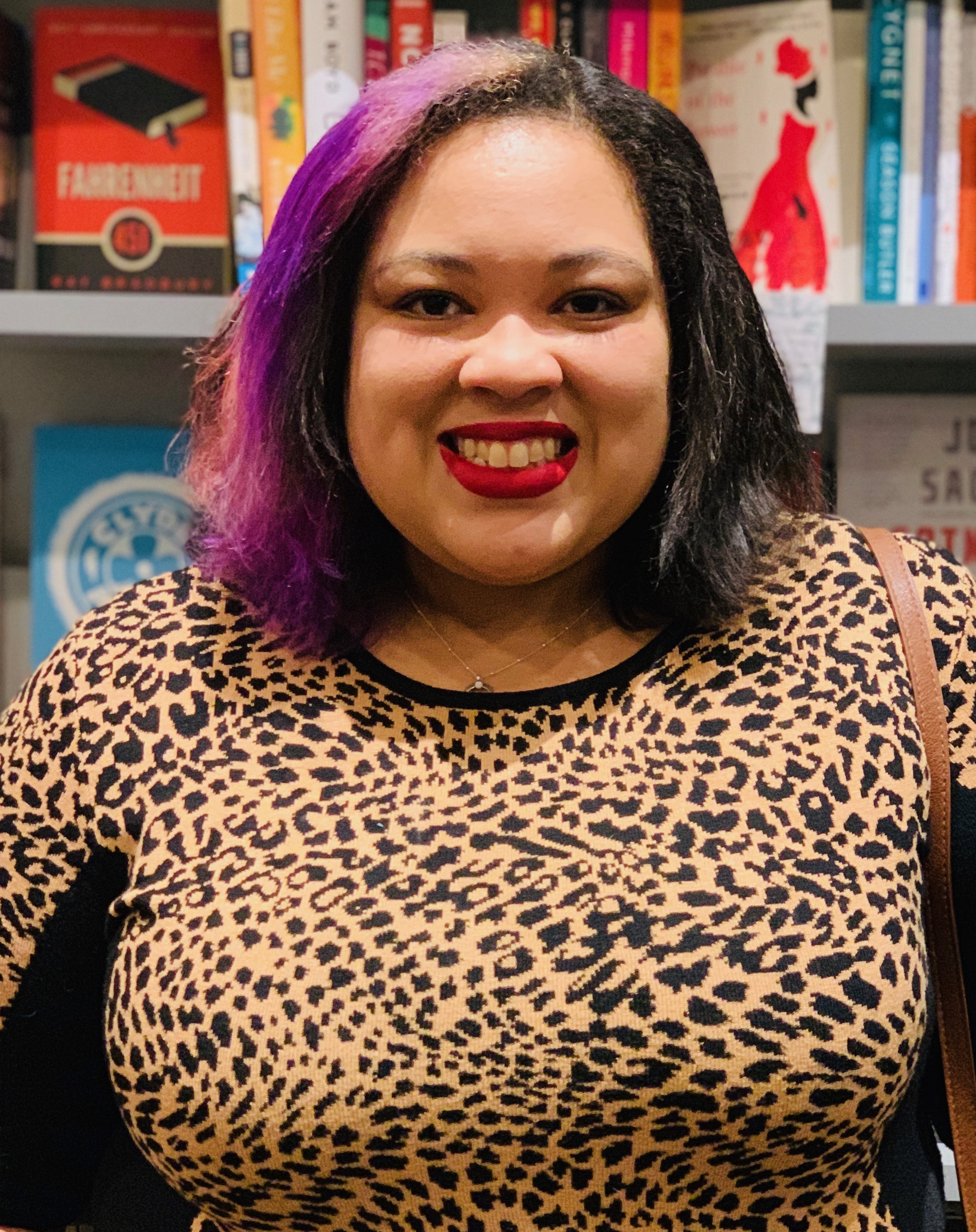
- Born: Danielle Valore Evans
- Education: Columbia University; University of Iowa
- Occupation: Writer
- Writing career
- Genre: Fiction
- Notable work: The Office of Historical Corrections (2020)
- Notable awards: PEN/Robert W. Bingham Prize (2011); Joyce Carol Oates Literary Prize (2021)

Danielle Valore Evans is an American fiction writer. She is a graduate of Columbia University and the University of Iowa. In 2011, she was honored by the National Book Foundation as one of its "5 Under 35" fiction writers. Before You Suffocate Your Own Fool Self, her first short story collection, won the 2011 PEN/Robert Bingham Prize. The collection's title echoes a line from "The Bridge Poem," from Kate Rushin's collection The Black Back-Ups (Firebrand Books, 1993). Reviewing the book in The New York Times, Lydia Peelle observed that the stories "evoke the thrill of an all-night conversation with your hip, frank, funny college roommate."

Evans's work was anthologized in Houghton Mifflin Harcourt's Best American Short Stories collections in 2008, 2010, and 2017. Her stories have also appeared in The Paris Review and A Public Space. In 2014 she became an assistant professor in the MFA program at the University of Wisconsin-Madison. Previously, she taught in the English department at American University. She now teaches at Johns Hopkins.

On July 17, 2020, Evans was featured on an episode of This American Life in the series "How to be alone", her audio segment being titled "The Unbearable Part".

The Office of Historical Corrections, a collection of seven stories, was released on November 10, 2020. It was a finalist for The Story Prize.

In April 2021, Evans won the Joyce Carol Oates Literary Prize.
