= Susannah Meadows =

American journalist

Susannah Meadows is an American journalist and author. She is currently a Senior Editor at The New York Times in the Opinion section.

== Books ==
Meadows is the author of a forthcoming book about Tami Maida, who was quarterback of her high school team in 1981. She is also the author of the book The Other Side of Impossible about people facing difficult illnesses who find ways of getting better on their own. It was published by Random House in 2017.

The book originated with a personal experience that Meadows wrote about in the widely viewed New York Times Magazine article, "The Boy With a Thorn in His Joints." The 2013 article was about her young son's unexpected recovery from juvenile idiopathic arthritis.

== Journalistic career ==
She has been a frequent contributor to The New York Times. She has written op-eds, features and book reviews. She wrote the monthly Newly Released column for the Arts section for the paper. She has written reviews for the Sunday Book Review section since 2002.

For ten years she was a reporter, writer, and editor at Newsweek magazine. The stories she covered include the 2004 presidential campaign, the aftermath of 9/11, Columbine, Hurricane Katrina, and the Duke lacrosse rape hoax. She has appeared on CBS This Morning, CNN, MSNBC, Fox News, ESPN, Charlie Rose, and The Brian Lehrer Show.

== Education and personal life ==
She is a cum laude graduate of Duke University.

She is married to the novelist Darin Strauss.
