= Half a Life (memoir) =

2010 book by Darin Strauss

- Author: Darin Strauss
- Language: English
- Genre: Memoir
- Published: August 2010 McSweeney's/Random House
- Publication place: United States
- Media type: Print (Hardback & Paperback)
- Pages: 224
- Awards: National Book Critics Circle Award for Autobiography
- ISBN: 0-8129-8253-3

Half a Life is a book by American author Darin Strauss. It received the National Book Critics Circle Award for memoir in 2011. The memoir grew out of a 2008 This American Life episode entitled "Life After Death," in which the author addressed the effects of a high school traffic accident.

== Summary ==
Strauss, a novelist, recounts how his life was profoundly altered when a car he was driving struck and killed a high school classmate. She was on a bicycle that swerved in front of his car. Although it was determined Strauss could in no way have avoided the accident, the book details his attempts, over half his life, to come to terms with his feelings of responsibility.

== Reception ==
Half a Life was enthusiastically received by critics in America and abroad.

Writing in The Guardian, writer and critic Robert McCrum called the book "a masterpiece....'Half my life ago, I killed a girl'. You'll rarely get a better first line. What follows—Strauss's precise, honest and rigorous account of a fateful road accident and its harrowing aftermath—fulfills every hope aroused in the casual reader." In the Chicago Tribune, critic Elizabeth Taylor called it "a book that inspires admiration, sentence by sentence...This is memoir in its finest form." Writer Dani Shapiro, in The New York Times Book Review, found the memoir "elegant, painful, stunningly honest." She continued, "At the center of this memoir thrums a question fundamental to what it means to be human: What do we do with what we’ve been given?" A critical favorite in the UK, Half a Life was called "one of the best books I have ever read" by Ali Catterall on the BBC, as well as "precise, elegantly written, fresh, wise, and very sad ... indicative not only of a very talented writer, but of a proper human being” by Nick Hornby

Half a Life was widely excerpted in venues such as GQ, This American Life, United Kingdom papers The Times and Daily Mail.

== Awards ==
Half a Life received the 2011 National Book Critics Circle Award for autobiography.
