= RJ Rosales =

Filipino actor and singer

- Born: Roseo José Dagdag Rosales Jr. 24 March 1974; Manila, Philippines
- Died: 4 December 2011 (aged 37); Sydney, Australia
- Resting place: Pine Grove Memorial Park, Minchinbury, New South Wales
- Education: University of Western Sydney
- Occupations: Actor, singer, musical theatre
- Years active: 1995–2011
- Agent: Star Magic (1995–2004)
- Known for: Thuy in Miss Saigon, Reginald Tuason in Blue Moon

Roseo José Dagdag Rosales Jr. (24 March 1974 – 4 December 2011) also known as RJ Rosales, was a Filipino Australian singer, actor, musical theatre performer, and TV presenter.

== Biography ==
=== Early life ===
Born in Manila, his family migrated to Sydney when he was thirteen. His parents are Roseo Macalintal Rosales and Erlinda Dagdag. He spent his early adult years in Sydney, where his family still resides, while he constantly moved to Singapore and Manila for work. Rosales finished a BS Mathematics degree from the University of Western Sydney and worked as a banker before entering show business. His childhood idols included James Ingram, Mariah Carey, Anthony Warlow and Martin Nievera.

=== Career ===
Rosales started his professional career by joining the cast of the original Australian production of Miss Saigon in 1996 as part of the ensemble. A major turning point for a banker with a BS Mathematics degree. However, the production only lasted three months, but later on in the late-1998 Rosales moved to Singapore and began a successful career both in theatre and television. His theatre credits that include leading roles in Chang & Eng, The Student Prince, Man of Letters, Cabaret, and Forbidden City. He also made numerous Singapore television appearances that included Spin and Style Doctors.

In addition, his work has extended to the Philippines where Rosales is also praised as a successful singer, actor, host and recording artist, performing with several popular artists, the most notable being the hit movie theme song "Together Forever" with Carol Banawa. It was his regular stint in ASAP, the number 1 musical variety show in the Philippines that made him a household name in the country.

He has held live concerts in the United States, Australia, Singapore, Japan and Thailand.

In the movie scene he was seen in the MMFF Best Movie for 2005, Blue Moon, where he was nominated for Best Supporting Actor.

=== Later work ===
From 2007 to 2008 Rosales was in Australia, performing in the revived production of Sir Cameron Mackintosh's musical Miss Saigon, in which he portrays Thuy, alongside Laurie Cadevida. For this role, he was nominated for the 2007 Helpmann Awards Best Supporting Actor in a Musical. During the latter part of the tour, Rosales also understudied and played the role of the Engineer, again earning him rave reviews. After completing the 14-month Miss Saigon tour that wowed audiences in Sydney, Melbourne, Adelaide, Brisbane and Perth, RJ went back to Singapore to stage his comeback solo concert at the Esplanade Theatres on the Bay dubbed as A Musical Journey with RJ Rosales on 29 August 2008.

=== Death ===
Rosales unexpectedly died in Sydney on 4 December 2011. The funeral mass was held at the Blessed John XXIII Parish Church in Stanhope Gardens. Rosales was laid to rest at the Pine Grove Memorial Park in Kingston St., Minchinbury.

== Filmography ==
=== Television ===
- Style Doctors (2004)
- ASAP (1995–2004)
- Showbiz Lingo (1996–1999)
- Attagirl (2001–2002)
- Da Pilya en Da Pilot (2001–2002)
- Sa Puso Ko Iingatan Ka (2002)
- Miss Earth (2002)
- Your Honor (2001–2002)
- Spin (2000–2001)
- ABCs of Health (2000–2001)
- The Making of Miss Saigon (2001)

=== Film ===
- Blue Moon (2006)

== Stage ==
- Into the Woods (2011), as Cinderella's Prince, Esplanade Theatre, Singapore
- I Love You, You're Perfect, Now Change (2011), Singapore Drama Centre, National Library of Singapore
- Crazy Christmas (2010), Singapore Drama Centre, National Library of Singapore
- Her Son, Jose Rizal (2010) as Jose Rizal, Tom Mann Theatre, Surry Hills, Sydney, Australia
- Beauty & The Beast (2009) – as The Beast, Singapore Drama Centre, National Library of Singapore
- A Musical Journey with RJ Rosales (2008), Esplanade Recital Hall
- Miss Saigon (1996, 2007–2008) – 1996:Ensemble 2007–2008: as Thuy; Understudy as The Engineer
- Forbidden City (2006) – as Prince Tuan, Esplanade Theatre, Singapore
- Cabaret (2006) – Esplanade Theatre, Singapore
- Man of Letters (2006) – NUS University Cultural Centre, Singapore
- All About Men 2 (2005), Music Museum, Manila, Philippines
- Beautiful Sunday: Songs from the Heart by RJ Rosales (2004) – Esplanade Concert Hall, Singapore
- Something Stupid Called Love (2003)
- East Meets West (2003)
- Chang & Eng – the Musical (1999, 2001, 2002) – as Chang
- Sayang (2001) – as DJ Mike, Jubilee Hall, Raffles Hotel
- The Student Prince (2000)
- In Celebration of Musical Theatre (2000)
- Underground – the Musical (1999)
- Locker Room (1999)
- 35@2000 (1999)
- Filipinas Circa 1880 – the Musical (1998)

== Music videos ==
- Tulad Ng Dati on YouTube
- Together Forever
- You’re All That I Live For
