= Darin Strauss =

American novelist (born 20th century)

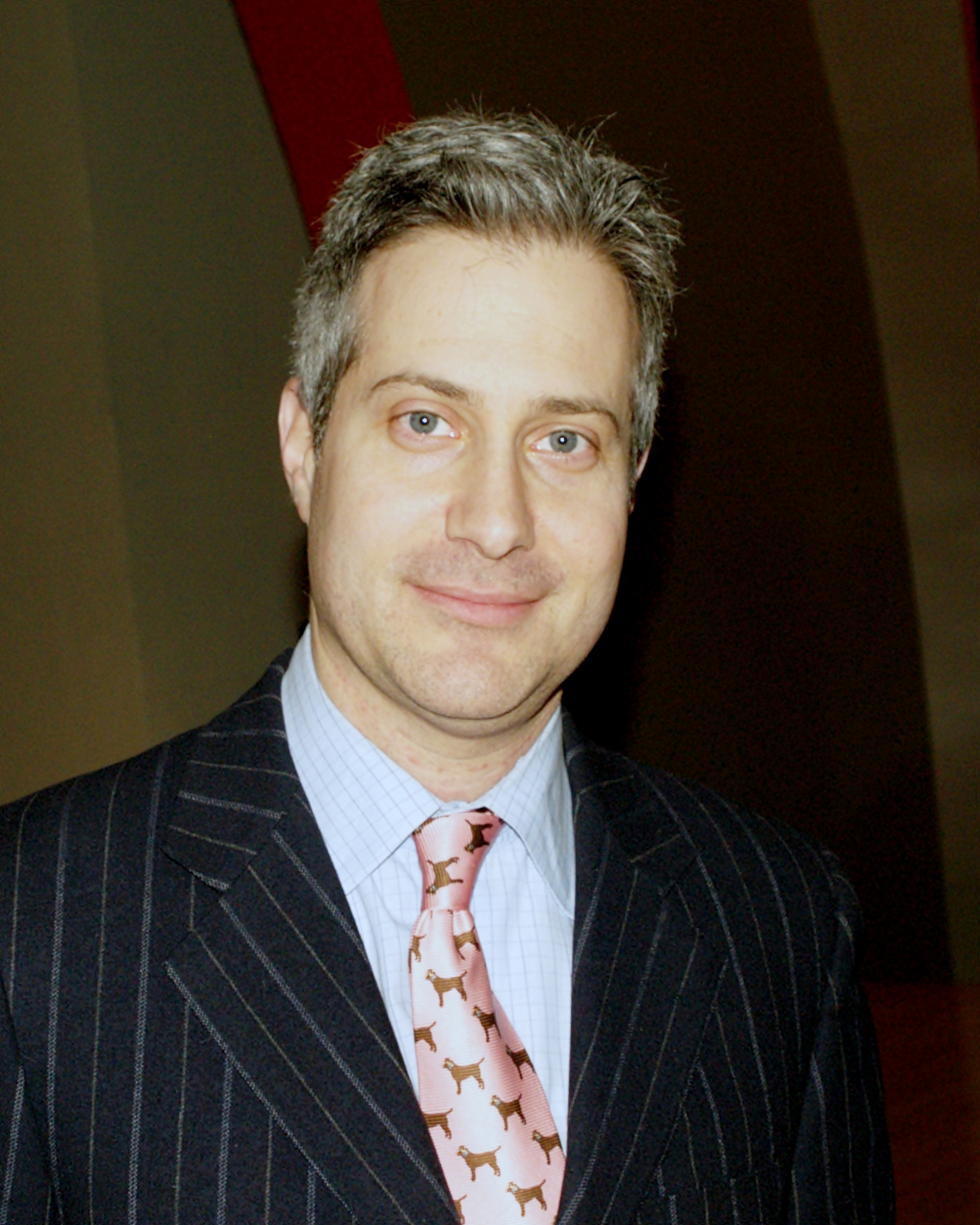
- Strauss in 2011
- Born: 1970 (age 55–56); Roslyn Harbor (Long Island) New York, U.S.
- Education: Tufts University; New York University
- Occupations: Writer (novelist, non-fiction), Academic
- Spouse: Susannah Meadows
- Writing career
- Period: 21st century
- Website: darinstrauss.com

Darin Strauss (born 1970) is an American writer whose work has earned a Guggenheim Fellowship and the National Book Critics Circle Award (NBCC Award).

Strauss's 2011 memoir Half a Life, won the 2011 NBCC Award for memoir/autobiography. His most recent book, the novel The Queen of Tuesday, came out in August 2020. It was nominated for the Joyce Carol Oates Literary Prize.

== Early life and education ==
Strauss was born in the Long Island town of Roslyn Harbor. He attended Tufts University in Massachusetts, where he studied with Jay Cantor. After attending graduate school at New York University in New York City, he played guitar in a band with Jonathan Coulton.

== Career ==
Strauss' 2000 first novel Chang & Eng – a runner-up for the Barnes & Noble Discover Award, the Literary Lions Award, a Borders Award winner, and a nominee for the PEN/Hemingway Award for Debut Novel – is based on the lives of conjoined twins Chang and Eng. It was a Los Angeles Times Best Book of the Year and a Newsweek Best Book of the Year. The rights to the novel were optioned to Disney, for the director Julie Taymor; the actor Gary Oldman purchased the rights from Disney. Strauss and Oldman are together adapting Chang and Eng for the screen.

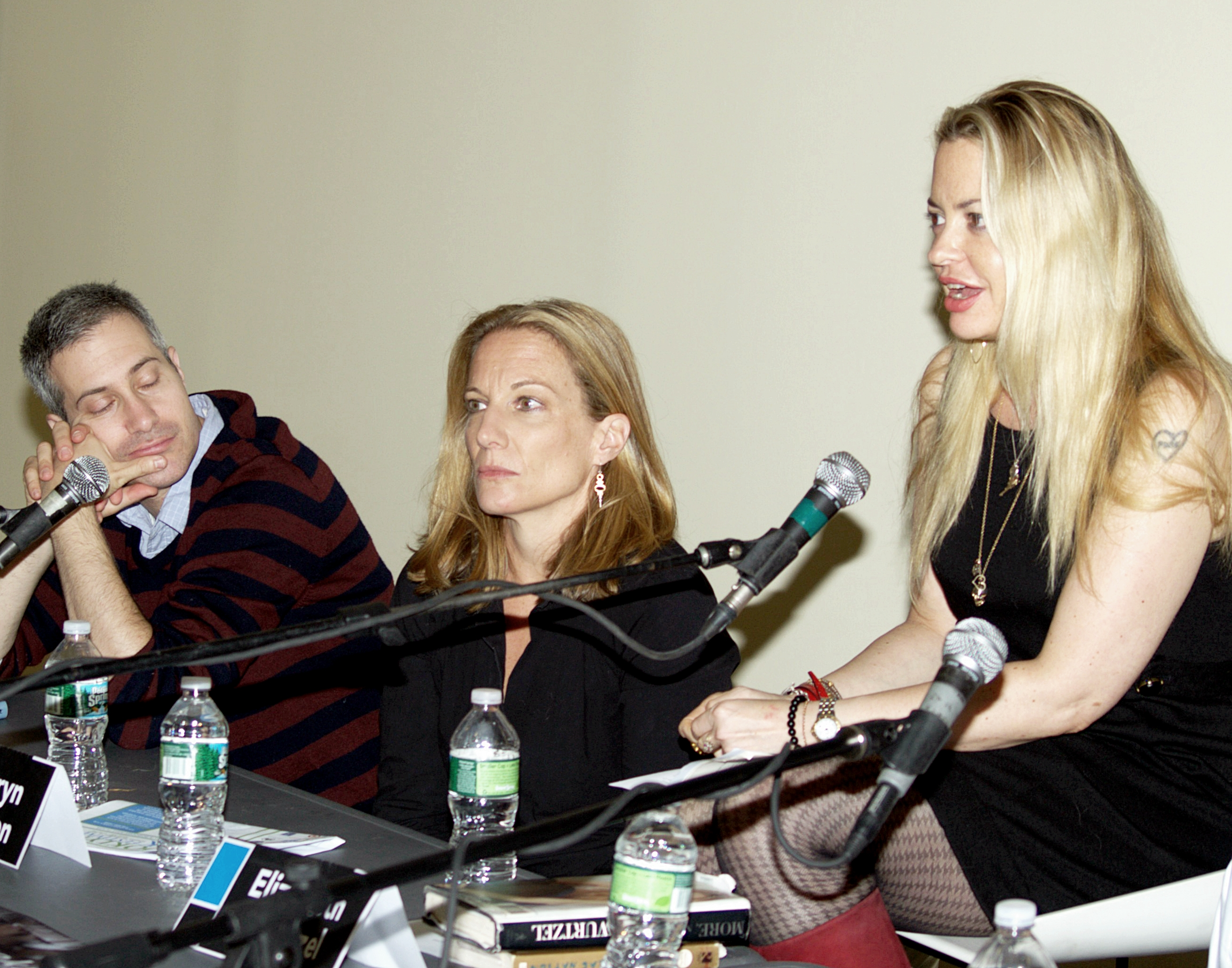
Strauss, Kathryn Harrison and Elizabeth Wurtzel on a panel at the 2010 Brooklyn Book Festival.

Strauss's second novel, The Real McCoy (2002), is based on the life of the boxer Charles "Kid McCoy". The Real McCoy was named a New York Times Notable Book," and one of the "25 Best Books of the Year," by the New York Public Library.

It was after this novel that Strauss won a Guggenheim Fellowship in fiction writing.

Strauss's third novel, More than It Hurts You, his first in a contemporary setting, was published by PenguinPutnam in 2008. Strauss blogged about his extensive book-tour for Newsweek, and was featured on The Late Late Show with Craig Ferguson and Good Morning America.

Strauss appeared on This American Life radio program in a July 2008 episode, titled "Life After Death", in which he talks about the effects of a traffic accident during high school, in which a classmate on a bicycle swerved in front of his car, and was killed. Although he could not have avoided the accident, and was not at fault, he still felt guilty, and it affected him for decades.

His next book, Half a Life, is a memoir concerning that traffic accident; it was published by McSweeney's in September 2010, and was excerpted in GQ magazine, and This American Life, and also in The Times and The Daily Mail (UK). Half a Life was named an Entertainment Weekly Must Read and a New York Times Editor's Pick – and a Best Book of the Year by NPR, Amazon, The Plain Dealer, and The San Francisco Chronicle, among many others. Half a Life was called "a masterpiece" by Robert McCrum in The Guardian, "one of the best books I have ever read" by Ali Catterall on the BBC, as well as "precise, elegantly written, fresh, wise, and very sad ... indicative not only of a very talented writer, but of a proper human being" by Nick Hornby.

Strauss' most recent book, The Queen of Tuesday(2020), is a hybrid of fiction, biography, and memoir, focused around an imagined love-affair between the author's grandfather and Lucille Ball. It has received favorable reviews in The New York Times, The Boston Globe, The Washington Post, The New Yorker, and the Los Angeles Times. The Millions literary magazine declared of the novel, "The best book yet from one of our best writers." In "New Pop Lit," Karl Wenclas wrote, "If Darin Strauss isn't the best contemporary American writer, he's near the top ... No one could write a better book!" On NBC News, Bill Goldstein said "I love this book ... Brilliant."

The novel was a Washington Post Best Book of the Year, a The Millions and Literary Hub Best Book of the Year, and a finalist for the Joyce Carol Oates Literary Prize, as well as being featured on CBS Sunday Morning, NBC News, the CW, and PBS's Articulate.

In addition to his writing of books, Strauss has been a prolific journalist, with pieces in the New York Times. Vanity Fair, GQ, the LA Times, The Chicago Tribune, and many others -- including a short stint as a columnist for al-Jazeera America, before it closed in 2016, and a recurring column about faith for Salon.

=== Critical reception ===
Strauss has been called "a brave new voice in literature" by The Wall Street Journal, and "one of the most sharp and spirited of his generation," by Powells Books, "sublime" and "brilliant" by The Boston Globe.

=== Awards and honors ===
- 2021: Joyce Carol Oates Literary Prize, finalist
- 2020: "Best Books of the Year", The Washington Post
- 2020: "Best Books of the Year", Literary Hub
- 2011: National Book Critics Circle Award, winner
- 2011: New York University's Alumni Achievement Award, winner
- 2010: "Editor's Choice", The New York Times
- 2010: "Best Books of the Year", NPR
- 2010: "Best Books of the Year", The Plain Dealer (Cleveland, Ohio)
- 2010: "Best Books of the Year", Amazon
- 2010: "Best Books of the Year", San Francisco Chronicle
- 2008: "Best Books of the Year", The Denver Post
- 2008: "Book of the Summer", GQ magazine
- 2006: Guggenheim Fellowship, winner
- 2005: "Outstanding Dozen" teaching award, New York University, winner
- 2002: "Times Notable Book", The New York Times
- 2002: "25 Best Books of the Year", New York Public Library
- 2000: "10 Best Novels of the Year", Newsweek
- 2000:"Best Books of the Year", Los Angeles Times
- 2000: ALA Alex Award, winner
- 2000: Barnes & Noble Discover Award, runner-up
- 2000: New York Public Library Young Lions Fiction Award, finalist

=== Works ===
==== Novels ====
- Chang & Eng (2000)
- The Real McCoy (2002)
- More than It Hurts You (2008)
- Olivia Twist (2019) (graphic novel)
- The Queen of Tuesday (2020)

==== Nonfiction ====
- Half a Life (memoir) (2010)

==== Selected anthologies ====
- Lit Riffs (2004)
- The Dictionary of Failed Relationships (2004)
- Coaches (2005)
- A People's Fictional History of the United States (2006)
- An Encyclopedia of Exes (2004)
- Bloodshot: An Insomnia Anthology (2007)
- Brooklyn Was Mine (2008)
- Brothers (2009)
- The Book of Dads (2009)
- Top of The Order: Best-Selling Writers on Baseball (2010)

==== Other ====
- Mr. Beluncle, by V. S. Pritchett; Strauss wrote the new introduction (2005)
- Long Island Shaolin, one of the first Kindle Singles – short works published by Amazon; other Kindle Single debut authors include Jodi Picoult and Rich Cohen

== Personal life ==
Strauss is married to journalist Susannah Meadows, who writes a monthly Newly Released Books column for The New York Times' daily Arts Section. He is the father of identical-twin boys. He Strauss resides in Brooklyn, New York, and teaches writing at New York University.

== See also ==
- List of American novelists
- List of Long Islanders
- List of New York University people
- List of people from Brooklyn
- List of Tufts University people
