= The Queen of Tuesday =

2020 book by Darin Strauss

- First edition
- Author: Darin Strauss
- Language: English
- Genre: Literary Fiction
- Published: August 2020
- Publisher: Random House
- Publication place: United States
- Media type: Print (hardback & paperback)
- Pages: 309
- ISBN: 9780812992762

The Queen of Tuesday is a book by American author Darin Strauss, published in August 2020. It has been a critical and commercial success, with positive reviews in newspapers and radio and television broadcasts across the country. It was named a best book of the year in The Washington Post, The Millions, Literary Hub and others, and was a finalist for the Joyce Carol Oates Literary Prize.

== Summary ==
Strauss writes a hybrid of family memoir, biography, and fiction, as he tells the story of Lucille Ball, as she gained fame through her television show, I Love Lucy, and finds solace from her husband's infidelity via a love affair with Isidore Strauss, the author's grandfather.

== Plot ==
In 1949, at a party on Coney Island thrown by Fred Trump Lucille Ball and Desi Arnaz have to convince a skeptical CBS to greenlight a television show starring a red-headed caucasian woman and a man from Cuba. As Lucille becomes disillusioned with Desi—he's flirting with another woman—she meets Isidore Strauss, the author's grandfather, and allows him to kiss her. This sets off a series of events that will echo through both their lives for decades.

The book examines both the birth of the television industry and of the American suburb, and is a meditation on fame. It has also been called – in The Washington Post – "a charming love story".

== Reception ==
The Queen of Tuesday has been met with enthusiastic critical praise. Writing in The New York Times, Elisabeth Egan called the book "a delight", and included it in its beach reading list. In The Boston Globe, critic Max Winter said it was "devastating" and "reads like a dream".

Writer Ron Charles, in The Washington Post, found the novel "brilliant". He continued, "What an impossibly daring premise for a novel — an act of almost Lucy-level audaciousness." The Los Angeles Times, called the novel "ingenious" and "timeless". And, in The New Yorker, the book was called "boisterous and touching".

Literary Hub called the book "extraordinary and fantastic", and "Book Reporter" said: "engaging... you will enjoy this one". On NBC News, Bill Goldstein said "I love this book... Brilliant". And, in New Pop Lit, Karl Wenclas declared: "No one could write a better book. If Darin Strauss isn't the best contemporary American novelist, he's near the top."
