= Joyce Carol Oates Literary Prize =

Literary annual award

The Joyce Carol Oates Literary Prize is an annual award presented by the New Literary Project to recognize mid-career writers of fiction. "Mid-career writer" is defined by the project as "an author who has published at least two notable books of fiction, and who has yet to receive capstone recognition such as a Pulitzer or a MacArthur." The prize, which carries a monetary award of $50,000, was established in 2017 and is administered by the New Literary Project, a collaboration of the Lafayette Library and Learning Center Foundation of Lafayette, California and the Department of English of the University of California, Berkeley.

Each year the longlist of finalists for the prize – who are selected by publishers, agents, authors, and author representatives – is announced in the fall of the year before, and the shortlist in early spring of the presenting year. The winner of the award is then announced in late spring. The winner gives reading in the San Francisco Bay area and receives a two-week residency in Lafayette and Berkeley. Shortlisted finalists receive $2,000.

The prize is named after author Joyce Carol Oates, and has been referred to as the Simpson Family Literary Prize and the Joyce Carol Oates Prize. Joyce Carol Oates is an honorary member of the project's board of directors, and has served several times as their artist-in-residence. The choice of a prize for a mid-career writer was a considered one. Joseph Di Prisco, the project's founding chairman says "There are too damn many 'emerging writer' prizes — what about emerged writers? ... Ninety-five percent of publishers’ catalogs are made up of writers in the middle of their careers, but unless you're J. K. Rowling or Stephen King, you're not on the best-seller lists. You need support."

The New Literary Project was founded in 2015 by the Lafayette Library, the UC Berkeley English Department, and the Contra Costa County Library. Its purpose is to foster fiction writing through educational outreach in schools and universities, and to celebrate and support authors.

== Recipients ==
Prize winners and finalists
Year	Author	Title	Result	Ref.
2017	T. Geronimo Johnson	Welcome to Braggsville	Winner	
2018	Anthony Marra	The Tsar of Love and Techno	Winner	
2018	Ben Fountain	Billy Lynn's Long Halftime Walk	Finalist	
2018	Samantha Hunt	The Dark Dark	Finalist	
2018	Karan Mahajan	The Association of Small Bombs	Finalist	
2018	Martin Pousson	Black Sheep Boy: A Novel in Stories	Finalist	
2019	Laila Lalami	The Moor's Account	Winner	
2019	Rachel Kushner	The Mars Room	Finalist	
2019	Valeria Luiselli	Lost Children Archive	Finalist	
2019	Sigrid Nunez	The Friend	Finalist	
2019	Anne Raeff	Winter Kept Us Warm: A Novel	Finalist	
2019	Amor Towles	A Gentleman in Moscow	Finalist	
2020	Daniel Mason	The Winter Soldier	Winner	
2020	Chris Bachelder	The Throwback Special	Finalist	
2020	Maria Dahvana Headley	The Mere Wife	Finalist	
2020	Rebecca Makkai	The Great Believers	Finalist	
2020	Peter Orner	Maggie Brown & Others	Finalist	
2020	Dexter Palmer	Mary Toft; or, The Rabbit Queen	Finalist	
2020	Kevin Wilson	Nothing to See Here	Finalist	
2021	Danielle Valore Evans	The Office of Historical Corrections	Winner	
2021	Jenny Offill	Weather	Finalist	
2021	Darin Strauss	The Queen of Tuesday	Finalist	
2021	Lysley Tenorio	The Son of Good Fortune	Finalist	
2022	Lauren Groff	Matrix	Winner	
2022	Christopher Beha	The Index of Self-Destructive Acts	Finalist	
2022	Percival Everett	The Trees	Finalist	
2022	Katie Kitamura	Intimacies	Finalist	
2022	Jason Mott	Hell of a Book	Finalist	
2023	Manuel Muñoz	The Consequences	Winner	
2023	Rabih Alameddine	The Wrong End of the Telescope	Finalist	
2023	Clare Beams	The Illness Lesson	Finalist	
2023	James Hannaham	Didn't Nobody Give a Shit What Happened to Carlotta	Finalist	
2023	David Means	Two Nurses, Smoking	Finalist	
2024	Ben Fountain	Devil Makes Three	Winner	
2024	Jamel Brinkley	Witness	Finalist	
2024	Patricia Engel	The Faraway World	Finalist	
2024	Idra Novey	Take What You Need	Finalist	
2024	Bennett Sims	Other Minds and Other Stories	Finalist	
2025	Jennine Capó Crucet	Say Hello to My Little Friend	Winner	
2025	Willy Vlautin	The Horse	Winner	
2025	Sarah Manguso	Liars	Finalist	
2025	Julia Phillips	Bear	Finalist	
2025	Morgan Talty	Fire Exit	Finalist	
