= Chang and Eng Bunker =

Thai-American conjoined twins (1811–1874)

- อิน-จัน บังเกอร์
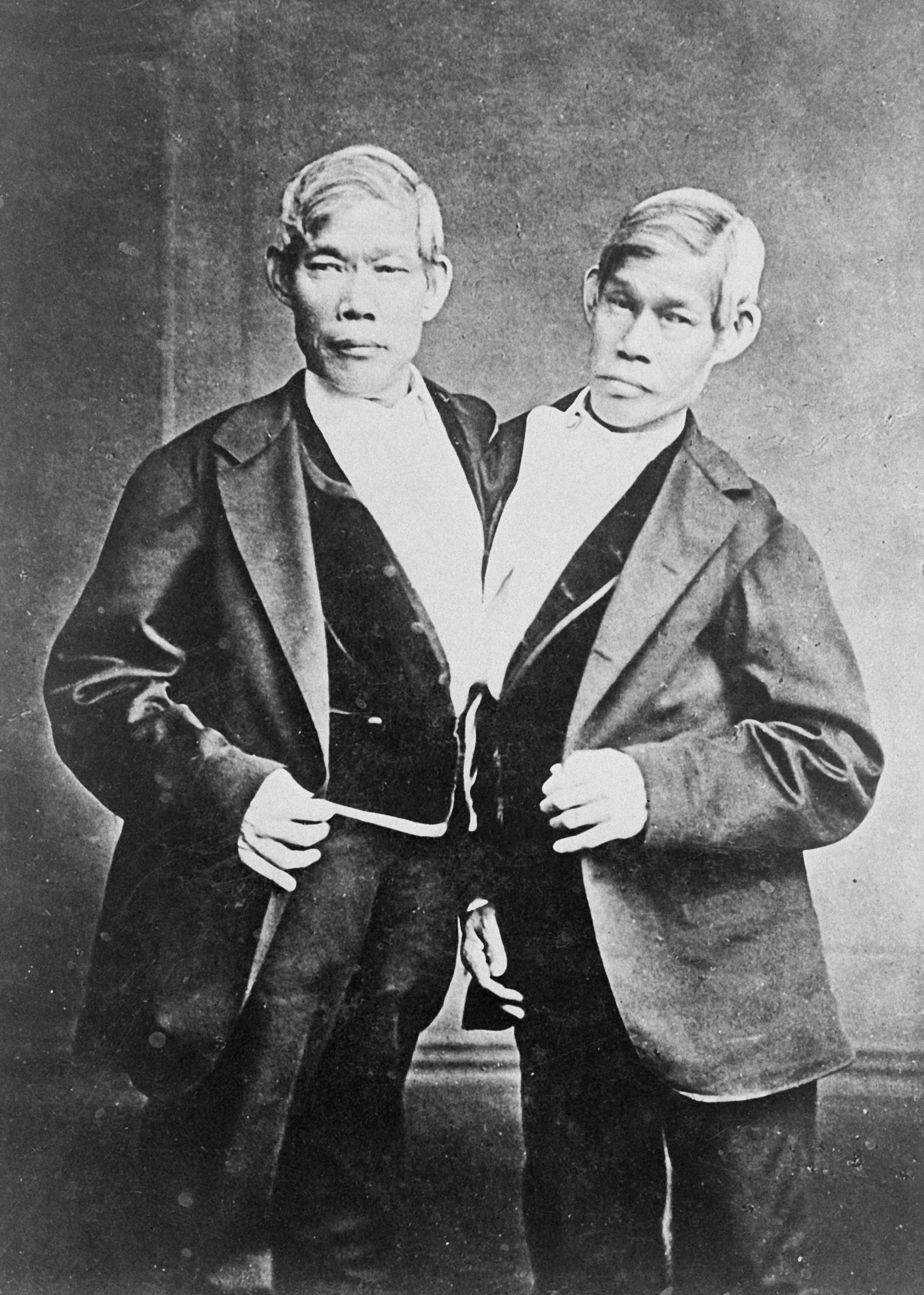
- Eng (left) and Chang (right) in later years
- Born: May 11, 1811; Samut Songkhram, Rattanakosin Kingdom
- Died: January 17, 1874 (aged 62); Mount Airy, North Carolina, United States
- Cause of death: Chang: Cerebral blood clot Eng: Fright and hemorrhagic shock
- Resting place: White Plains Baptist Church, Mount Airy, N.C. 36.4536°N 80.6288°W
- Years active: 1829–1870
- Known for: Exhibitions as curiosities, and known as the original "Siamese twins"
- Spouse(s): Chang: Adelaide Yates; Eng: Sarah Yates (both m. 1843)
- Children: Chang: 10; Eng: 11

Chang Bunker (Thai: จัน บังเกอร์) and Eng Bunker (Thai: อิน บังเกอร์) (May 11, 1811 – January 17, 1874) were Siamese-American conjoined twin brothers whose fame propelled the expression "Siamese twins" to become synonymous for conjoined twins in general. They were widely exhibited as curiosities and were "two of the nineteenth century's most studied human beings".

The brothers were born in Siam (later Thailand) to a family of Chinese descent and were brought to the United States in 1829. They became known to American and European audiences in "freak shows". Newspapers and the public were initially sympathetic to them, and within three years, the brothers left the control of their managers, who they thought were cheating them, and toured on their own. In early exhibitions, the brothers were exoticized and displayed their athleticism; they later held conversations in English in a more dignified parlor setting.

In 1839, after a decade of financial success, the twins quit touring and settled near Mount Airy, North Carolina. They became American citizens, bought enslaved people, married local sisters, and fathered 21 children, several of whom accompanied them when they resumed touring. Chang and Eng's respective families lived in separate houses, where the twins took alternating three-day stays. After the Civil War, they lost part of their wealth along with the people they enslaved. Eng died hours after Chang at age 62. An autopsy revealed that their livers were fused in the ligament connecting their sterna.

The novelist Darin Strauss writes, "their conjoined history was a confusion of legend, sideshow hyperbole, and editorial invention even while they lived." Many works have fictionalized the Bunkers' lives, often to symbolize cooperation or discord, notably in representing the Union and Confederacy during the Civil War.

== In Siam (1811–1829) ==
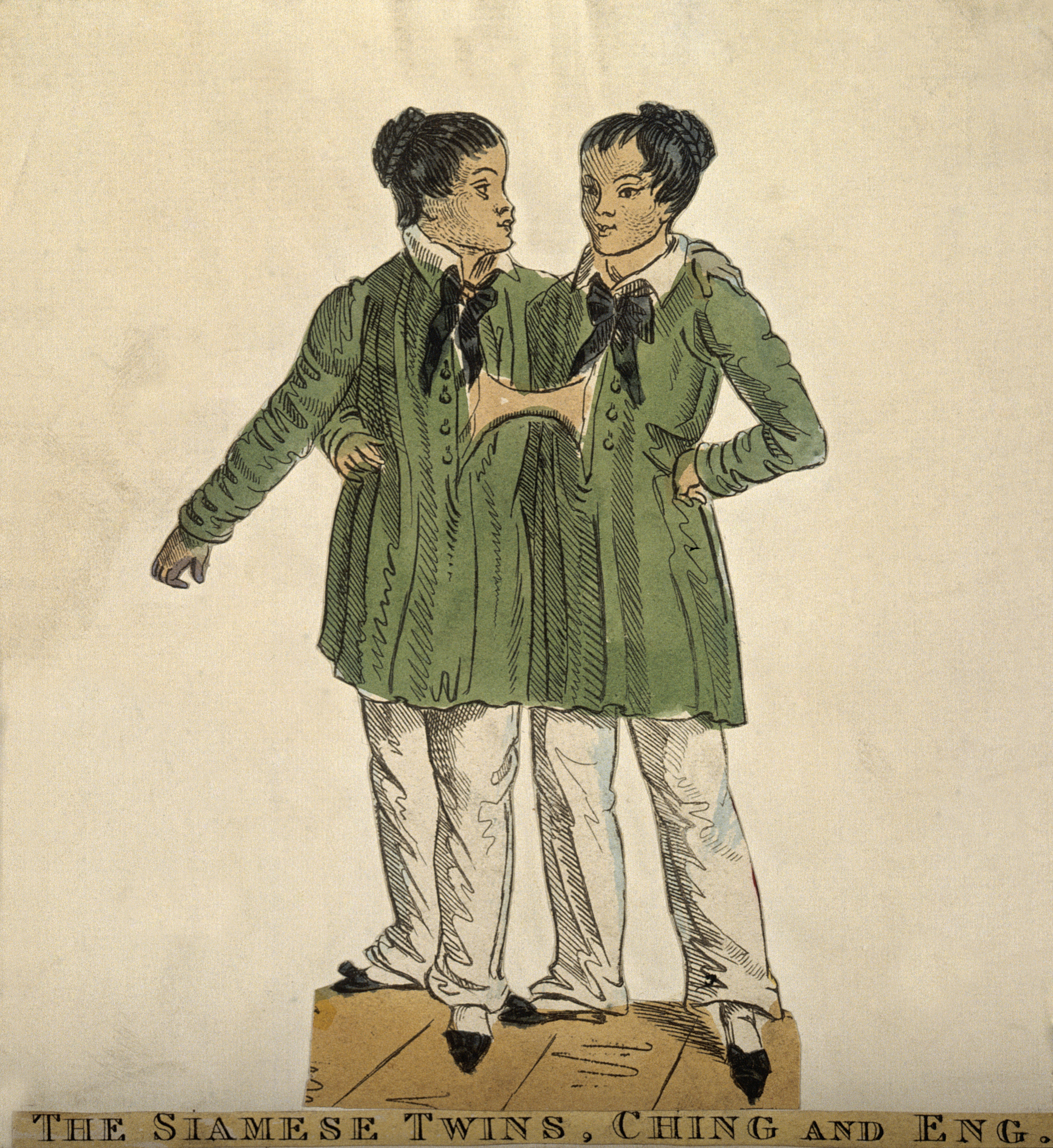
Colored sketching of the young twins

Chang and Eng (Note: Their parents named them In and Chun (or Jun) (Thai pronunciation: [īn] and [t͡ɕān]), which contrary to popular belief during their lifetime do not mean "left" and right", and they were known locally as the "Chinese twins" (Huang 2018, pp. 27–28). According to Huang, the twins themselves signed their names as 曾 and 因. He speculates that these names derive from Cantonese, though other sources suggest that the twins were Teochew, due to the historical prevalence of Teochews among Thais with Chinese ancestry (Huang 2018, pp. 52–53).) (จัน-อิน) were born in 1811 in Siam (modern-day Thailand). Their mother reportedly said their birth was no more difficult than that of their other several siblings. Their exact date of birth and details of their early lives are unclear. The earliest report on the twins assigns the birth month of May 1811. (Note: The earliest report of their birth date is in the Boston Patriot and Mercantile Advertiser published August 17, 1829. Other reports give dates in late 1811 or early 1812. Records from Siamese royalty lead to the year 1812. An attempt to locate a specific date of birth is likely futile, as no birth records of the twins exist (Orser 2014, pp. 11, 208). Whatever the real date may be, May 11, 1811 is the generally accepted one (Orser 2014, p. 194).) Their native village is called Meklong (now Samut Songkhram), where a statue commemorates them.

Their father, Ti-eye or Ti (นายที), was a fisherman of Chinese descent. He died when the twins were young, possibly in a smallpox epidemic that ran through the area in 1819. Their mother, Nak (อำแดงนาก), raised ducks with her children's help and raised Chang and Eng like her other children in a "matter-of-fact" way without special attention on them being conjoined. Nak's ethnic origin is unclear; varying accounts suggest that she was Siamese, Chinese, part of both, or part-Chinese and part-Malay. (Note: There are several narratives relating to Chang and Eng's siblings. Their mother had several other children, though stories attributing to her multiple sets of twins or triplets are probably misguided (Orser 2014, p. 11).) Chang and Eng were raised as Theravada Buddhists. Despite being joined at the sternum, they were lively youths.

The "discovery" of the brothers is credited to the Scottish merchant Robert Hunter. Hunter was a trusted trade associate of the Siamese government who traveled with considerable freedom. In 1824, Hunter reportedly first met the twins while he was on a fishing boat in the Menam River and the twins were swimming at dusk. He mistook them for a "strange animal", but after meeting them he saw economic opportunity in bringing them to the West. (Note: In his November 1829 account of the discovery, John Collins Warren writes, "They were naked from the hips upwards, were very thin in their persons, and it being dusk, he mistook them for some strange animal" (Orser 2014, p. 13).)

He would later tell a story that the king of Siam (Note: Most likely King Rama III.) had ordered the brothers' deaths and had originally forbidden him to transport them out of the country. Regardless of the story's veracity, it took five years for Hunter to bring them away. Hunter and American sea captain Abel Coffin departed to the United States with the twins in summer 1829.

A contract Hunter and Coffin signed with Chang and Eng stipulated that their tour would last for five years, though a rumor later circulated that their mother had sold them into slavery, a charge that greatly upset the twins. Christian missionaries contacted her in 1845, four years before she died. She had believed that her conjoined sons were dead, having not seen them for fifteen years, but was informed that they were alive and recently married. (Note: Their mother said that she had a "strong desire to see them again". Despite the missionaries' claim that they would return, evidence does not suggest that their mother was reached again (Orser 2014, p. 108).)

== Travel and touring (1829–1839) ==
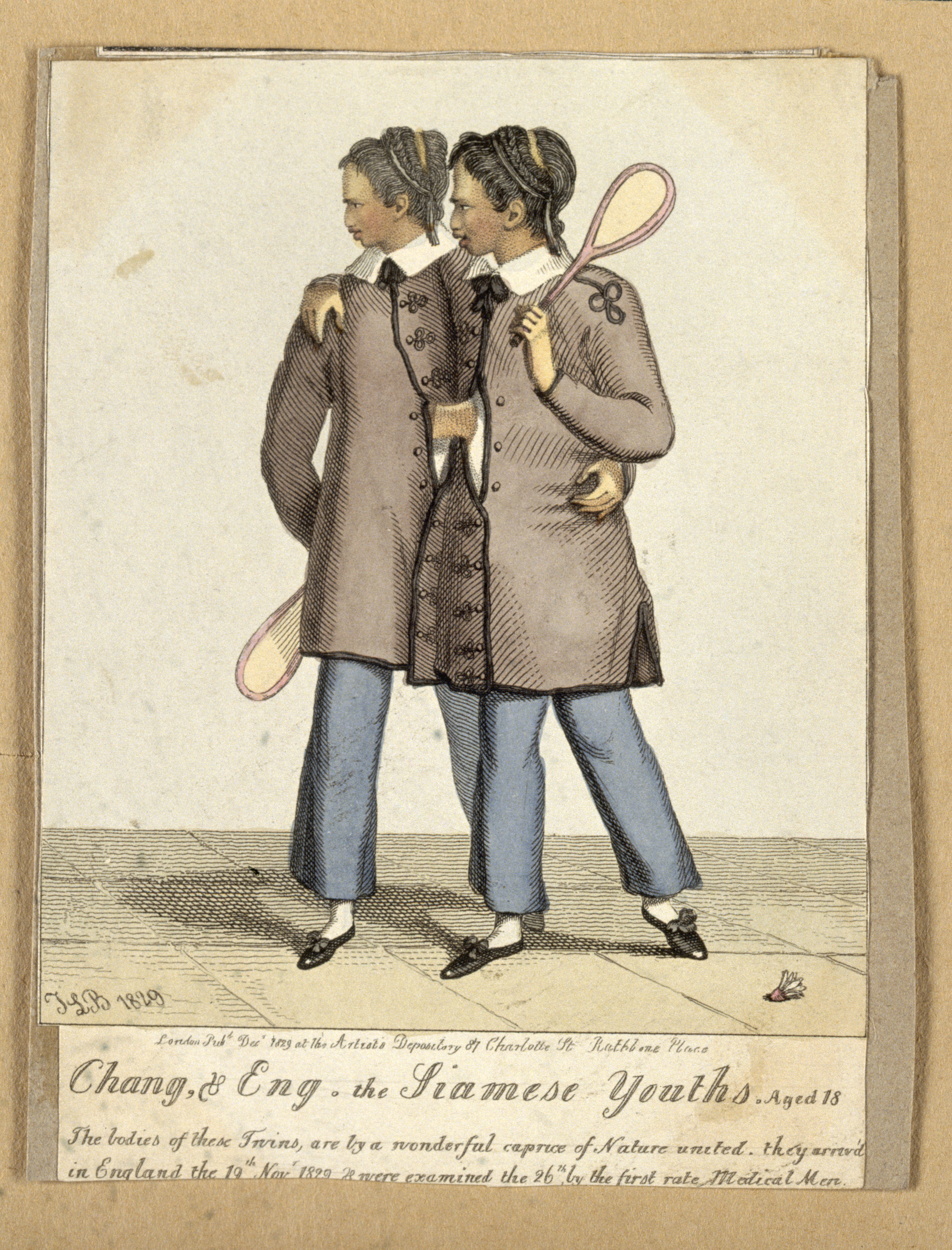
Early reports on the twins described them as young boys, a label they tried to shake.

Chang and Eng were 17 years old when they traveled to the United States with Hunter, Coffin, a crew of 18 men, and a Siamese translator. They arrived in Boston on August 16, 1829, and the next day the Boston Patriot confirmed Coffin and Hunter's ambitions: the twins "will probably be exhibited to the public".

They were soon inspected by physicians, many of whom employed physiognomy and phrenology. Their arrival was excitedly reported in newspapers with varying degrees of racial stereotypes and falsehoods.

After leaving the United States they toured major cities in the British Isles, and by the time they returned to New York in March 1831, the twins had gained some skill in English reading, writing, and speaking. Newspapers reported that they had earned great profits, and their promotional materials began to describe their customers as dignified—though their act of exhibition could seem crude—to help bring more moneyed visitors.

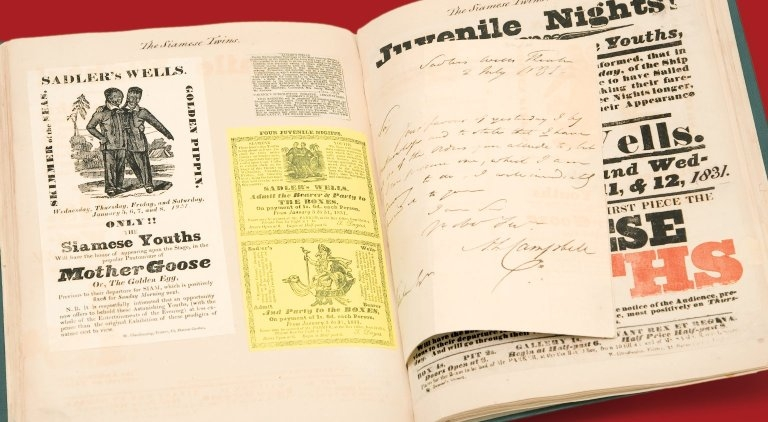
Promotional ephemera

The twins first appeared in London at the Egyptian Hall. They later toured Europe, then returned to the United States, appearing at dime museums and other venues. When touring in cities, the twins stayed at a hotel for several days (sometimes more than a week) and charged audiences to attend their "freak show". In small towns, their manager would send flyers ahead of their arrival, and they would remain at a lodge or inn for just one or two nights.

Their first manager, James W. Hale, introduced them as the "Siamese Youths", a name they preferred to "boys". The usual admission price was 25 cents, equivalent to $8 in 2025, and pamphlets and drawings featuring the brothers were usually also for sale. In early performances, the twins performed physical feats, running and doing somersaults. An emphasis was placed on their exoticness: they wore pigtails, dressed in "Oriental" clothing, and were soon billed as the "Siamese twins". Their performances occasionally featured swimming, playing checkers, and doing parlor tricks.

=== Conflicts on tour ===
In summer 1831, Hale took the twins on a retreat in Lynnfield, Massachusetts. While hunting, they thought they were being taunted and harassed by over a dozen local men who had approached them, going on to strike a man named Elbridge Gerry with the butt of their gun. Gerry retaliated, throwing a heavy stone at one twin's head, drawing blood. The twins then fired at Gerry, though the gun was blank. The men ran off. The following day, one of the men pressed charges, alleging that the twins were at fault. A special court was convened, and the brothers were arrested for disturbing the peace and paid bond for good behavior.

The Salem Mercury portrayed the twins as the victims of the Lynnfield incident; other papers followed suit. Two weeks after the event, Gerry published a letter titled "To the Public", saying that the twins had provoked the violence. Hale was angered that the twins had gotten into a situation in which their public image could be slandered. He resigned as their manager in September 1831 and was replaced by a friend, Charles Harris. Hale counseled Harris; for example, he could avoid paying a Virginia exhibition tax through careful marketing: he was to call the twins' tour a "business", not a "show". In the public eye, Abel Coffin, the man who first brought them to the United States, continued to serve as a father figure to the twins.

The twins were soon involved in another conflict, during a performance in Alabama. A surgeon in attendance asked to conduct a close examination of the ligature connecting the twins. They refused, having not permitted close inspections for more than two years. Rising in anger, the doctor said, "You are all a set of impostors and pickpockets", and disorder erupted as guests threw objects across the room. The twins fled and later, because they probably were the first ones to disturb the peace, paid a good-behavior bond as ordered by a magistrate.

Relations between the twins and the Coffins strained beginning in January 1831 when Abel's wife, Susan Coffin, upset the twins by refusing their requests. Chang and Eng then started asking Harris to send letters pleading their cases. In one instance, Mrs. Coffin refused the twins an additional $3 per week to feed their horse, a refusal the twins compared to clipping a bird's wings and saying, "Now you may fly if you wish". Harris first maintained a distinction between his and the twins' point of view but eventually wrote using their voice and had them sign their names, "Chang Eng".

Abel Coffin left for Asia in late 1831 and planned to return to America by January 1832. After January passed, the twins' relations with Mrs. Coffin broke down completely, the twins regularly asking when Abel Coffin would return. They hoped to be free from commitment to the Coffins on their 21st birthday (in May 1832), as Abel had once promised. They also worried that, should he never return, they would remain in permanent limbo between contract and freedom. They began also to think that Mrs. Coffin was "deceitful and greedy" as they learned of the Coffins' management practices.

For instance, Mrs. Coffin had encouraged them to perform when they were sick. During one trip, the Coffins had paid full fare for themselves but booked the twins into steerage, listing them as servants, and lied to them when they were questioned. And the twins learned that Mrs. Coffin was willing to pay a higher wage only for a certain attendant, not the one whom the twins preferred. They jointly came to believe that Mrs. Coffin "had misled me".

=== Independent travel ===
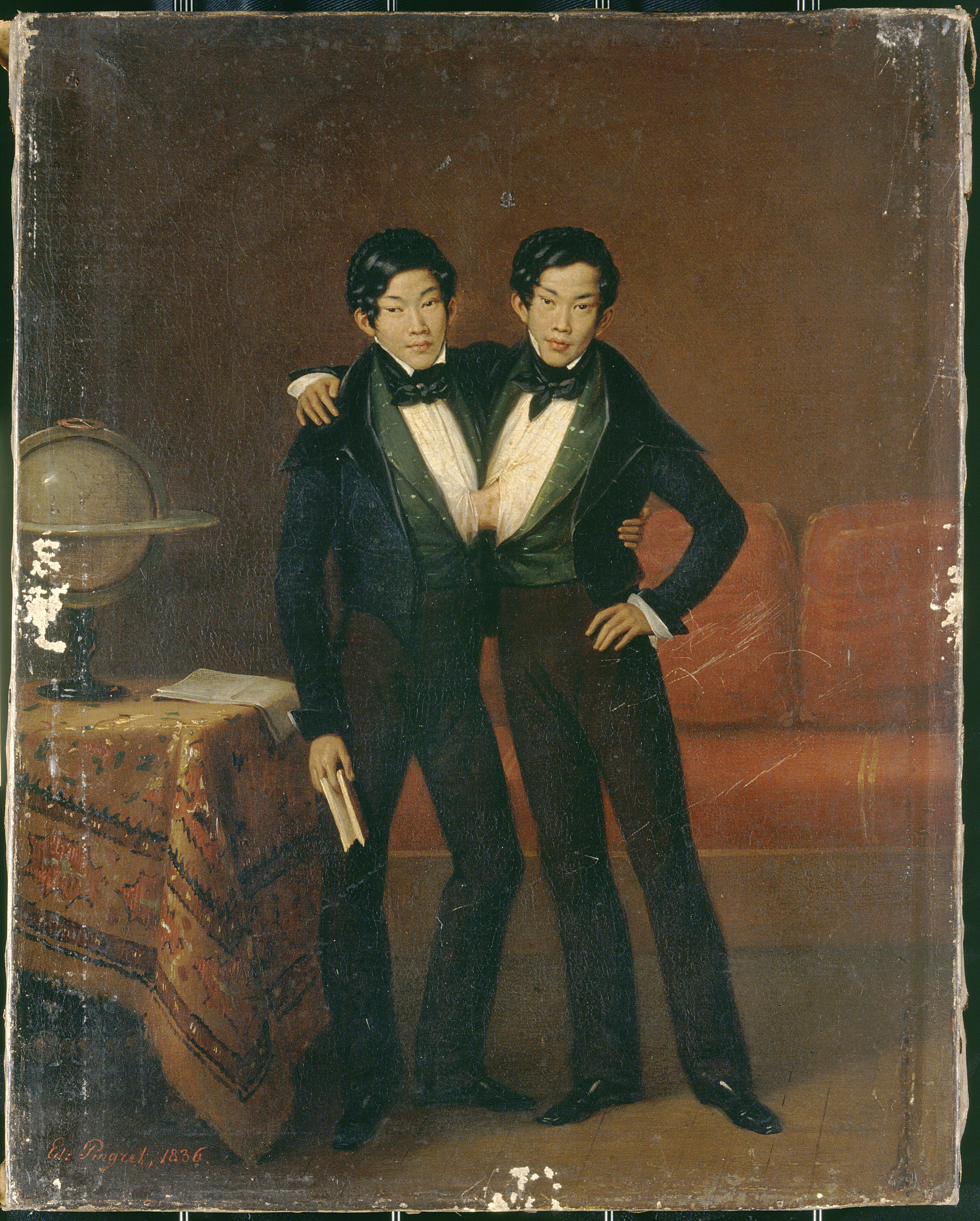
Oil painting by Édouard Pingret, 1836

Abel Coffin, upon returning to Massachusetts in July 1832, discovered that Chang and Eng were missing. Coffin accused Hale of "exciting his subjects to rebellion" (Hale had done no such thing), and after a chase he finally tracked down the brothers in Bath, New York. Hale later said Coffin told him he had met the twins "whoring, gaming, and drinking" and "gave Chang Eng 'the damndest thrashing they ever had in their lives'". On the twins' desertion, Coffin simply wrote to his wife as follows: "We have had much talk; they seem to feel themselves quite free from me."

The twins themselves did not immediately announce that they were in business on their own, nor did they much alter their public persona. Nonetheless, they were now exclusively referred to by their stage name—the "Siamese twins"—and they did change some parts of their performance, such as by wearing more American clothes, speaking English with the audience, and presenting themselves no longer as "boys" but men. They also answered audience questions sitting in a formal, parlor setting and hunted game in their free time. What had once essentially been their indentured servitude had changed to freedom; they were in command of their act and hired their own staff.

Chang and Eng did not perform on their sightseeing trip across Western Europe in 1835–36 visiting Paris, Antwerp, The Hague, Amsterdam, and other cities. In 1836, Hale published a pamphlet about them titled A Few Particulars concerning Chang-Eng, the United Siamese Brothers, Published under Their Own Direction. Positioning the twins as upper-class, saying that in Siam, Chinese were elites; it reported, among other particulars, that a representative of President Jackson had visited the twins' mother.

== Settling and later years (1839–1874) ==
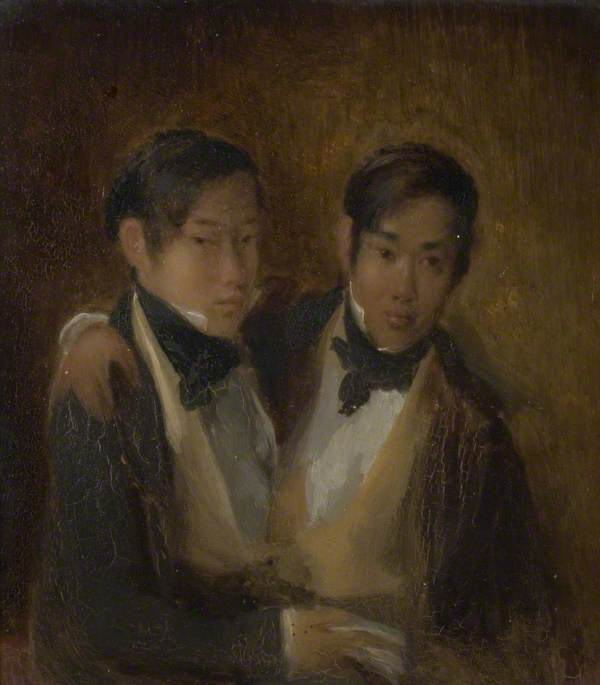
Portrait in the English style, 1846

=== Traphill ===
The final setting for Chang and Eng's on-and-off 1829–1839 tour was held in Jefferson, North Carolina, on July 3 and 4, 1839. According to a family friend, their move to Wilkes County, in the northwest of the state, allowed them to "engage in chasing stag and catching trout ... to enjoy the recreation which they had desired to find far away from the hurrying crowds."

In October 1839, they purchased 150 acres (61 ha) for $300, equivalent to $9,070 in 2025, near the rural community of Traphill, in mountainous northeast Wilkes County. The tract runs along Little Sandy Creek, near the Roaring River.

They soon became well acquainted with members of elite Wilkes society, including James Calloway and Robert C. Martin, both physicians; Abner Carmichael, the county sheriff; and James W. Gwyn Jr., the county's superior court clerk. Charles Harris, their former manager, relocated with them, and he became the Traphill postmaster. (Note: In October 1839 Harris wed Frances "Fannie" Baugus, daughter of Robert Baugus, who had helped the twins with living arrangements when they first arrived in Wilkes. In November 1840, Fanny's older brother Samuel married Letha Yates, daughter of David and Nancy Yates and older sister to the twins' future wives. Thus Chang and Eng would become related to Harris by marriage. Orser 2014, pp. 85–86, 88.) The month they bought the land, the twins (as well as Irish-born Harris) became naturalized citizens. Gwyn administered their oath of allegiance; despite a federal law from 1790 restricting naturalization to "free white persons", citizenship was a matter generally governed by local attitudes. (Note: According to Orser, "The twins were applying in a county that had very few immigrants and no other Asians, in a region whose color line was drawn decisively between white and black, in a court where they had been neighbors with the man administering the oaths [Gwyn]." Orser 2014, p. 82.) (Note: On race, Wu concludes Chapter 1, "Labor and Ownership in the American South", thusly (paraphrased): The Bunkers were Asian Americans; they could circumvent many de jure and de facto restrictions on other nonwhites, however. Most of their interaction with other nonwhites was when they were in the role of slaveholders. "These tensions on interconnectedness and partition, on multiple levels, constitute the numerous contradictions the Bunkers present to the complicated landscape of American culture." Wu 2012, pp. 34–35.)

A home on Chang and Eng's Traphill land was constructed in 1840. The brothers would buy foodstuffs from Wilkes slaveholders and trade dry goods with their neighbors. They also bought enslaved people and hired several women as housekeepers; the twins' first captive laborer was named "Aunt" Grace Gates. Prosperous from touring, they displayed their wealth through elegant house decorations; by the early 1840s, their property was the third-most valuable in the county at $1,000, equivalent to $32,250 in 2025. Settled, they planned to stop exhibiting for good, content to live in Traphill. The Whig Party newspaper Carolina Watchman of Salisbury called them "genuine Whigs", and the Boston Transcript reported that they were "happy as lords".

[On Chang and Eng:] It is a phenomenon, not, perhaps, to be witnessed again in the Country, to see Asiatics transformed to good American citizens, not only in language but in feeling. They have lost every vestige of their native tongue. In fact, they speak English fluently, and almost without foreign accent. A few words seem to be impracticable, but they are chatty and communicative, and hence their perfection in our language. They are altogether American in feeling.

— Raleigh Register
April 13, 1853

In 1840, a profile of the twins in the Tennessee Mirror made clear the twins' intentions to marry. Many newspapers regularly joked about this, discouraging their marriage not just with objections over the twins' disability but also because of their race. Nevertheless, on April 13, 1843, Baptist preacher Colby Sparks officiated the weddings between Eng and Sarah Yates, and between Chang and Adelaide Yates. Though national (mainly Northern) newspapers generally condemned the marriages, there was probably little local reaction except purported vandalism of Sarah and Adelaide's parents' house the night before the wedding. (Note: Orser notes that the narrative about protesters smashing the twins' windows because of their marriage was most likely introduced in Kay Hunter's 1964 popular biography Duet for a Lifetime; she "did not disclose her sources for this specific detail". Orser 2014, p. 95.) The Bunkers would prominently feature their marriages when they went back on tour later in life.

By the late 1840s, the twins spoke English fluently, and had filed criminal charges against several white people. They had also adopted the English-language surname Bunker, in honor of a woman whom they met in New York and admired. Continued newspaper coverage, as visitors flocked to their Traphill home, established their place as national celebrities; and they felt themselves to be Americans. The Bunkers carved a unique place in Americans' perception of race—they were considered nonwhite but were afforded many of the privileges of white people, being fairly wealthy Southern slaveholders with property rights.

=== Mount Airy ===
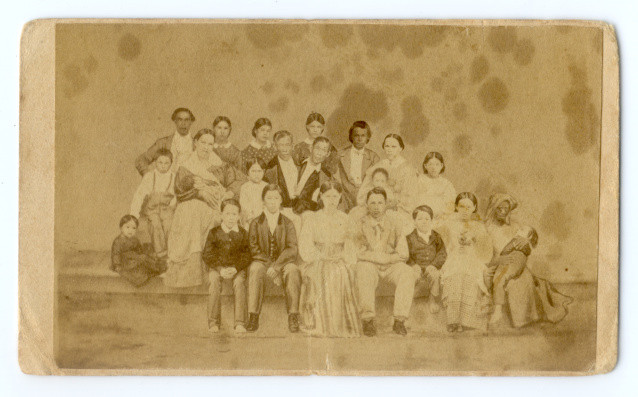
The Bunkers, wives, 18 children, and the first of their slaves, Grace Gates

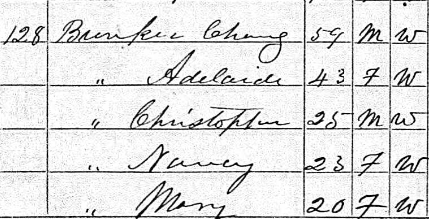
Chang Bunker listed as a white male on the 1870 census.

On March 1, 1845, the Bunkers bought a plot of 650 acres (260 ha) in Surry County. They had a home built—at first just for part-time use—about 5 miles (8 km) south of Mount Airy, along Stewart's Creek. The twins amassed wealth during the late 1840s and 1850s and lived in luxury as plantation owners. In 1850, it was estimated that they had invested $10,000 in property in North Carolina, equivalent to $387,000 in 2025. Meanwhile, they had a merchant in New York who managed another $60,000 for importing, equivalent to $2,322,000 in 2025, and they lived off the interest.

For about a decade they split their time between Mount Airy and Traphill because their families had grown large; by 1847 Adelaide had given birth to four children; Sarah, to three. They would maintain the Traphill residence through 1853; later their time was divided solely between two homes located around Mount Airy. Then for the next decades, the twins would alternate which house they used, three days at a time; the twin who owned the current house could elect to do whatever he wanted while his brother complied and kept silent.

In 1850, ten of the 18 people they enslaved were under the age of seven, some being owned only to be sold later for profit, and others growing up to work the fields. The Bunker plantations produced wheat, rye, corn, oats, and potatoes, and they raised cows, sheep, and pigs. Unlike families that owned many North Carolina farms, the Bunkers did not grow tobacco, which may suggest that their plantation was run primarily to feed the Bunker family and its laborers, not for commercial purposes. The press characterized the Bunkers' treatment of the enslaved as particularly harsh, though the twins decried accusations of cruelty and said that their wives supervised the captives and raised money for their education. (Note: For instance, the Greensborough Patriot wrote: "In driving a horse or chastising their negroes, both of them [the Bunkers] use the lash without mercy. A gentleman who purchased a black man, a short time ago, from them, informed the writer he was 'the worst whipped negro' he ever saw." Chang and Eng replied quickly: "That portion of said piece relating to the inhuman manner in which we had chastized a negro man which we afterwards sold is a sheer fabrication and infamous falsehood." Orser 2014, p. 127.)

Though the Bunkers were generally part of the region's aristocracy, some of their practices set them apart. They were occasionally seen performing manual labor; their method of chopping wood was particularly effective: they would wield an axe with all four hands, for more force, or would rapidly alternate turns swinging. They continued recreational hunting, and they took up fishing, drinking, and several sports.

=== Return to touring ===
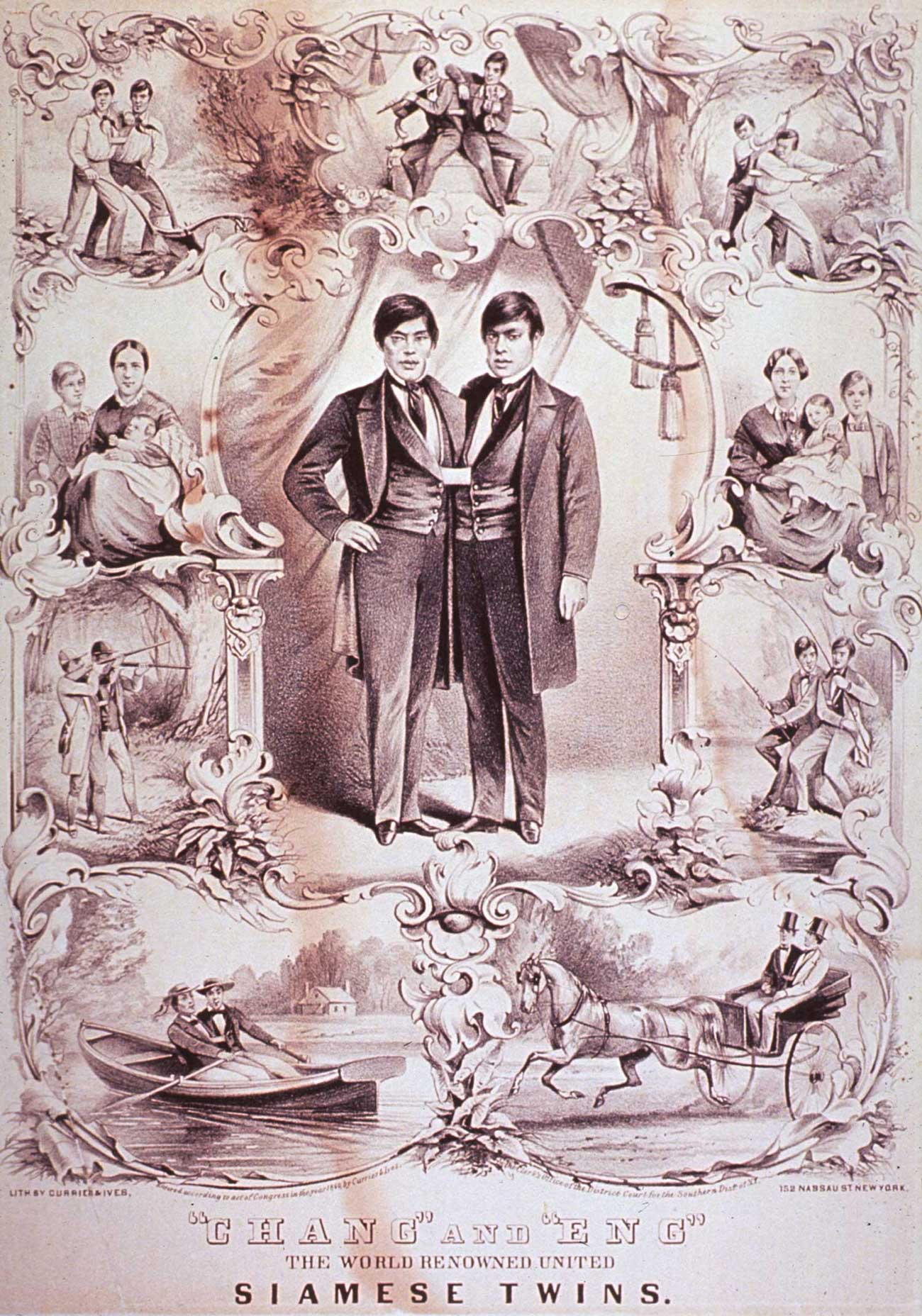
Lithograph of "The World Renowned United Siamese Twins", Currier and Ives, New York City, 1860

Partial retirement ended up not suiting the Bunkers, and they sought to resume touring for what they called financial reasons: they said they needed to earn more money to support their then-seven children. They traveled to New York City in 1849 with daughters Katherine and Josephine, both aged five, but the brief tour petered out because of poor management, and they returned to North Carolina. Advertisements had described them as "The Living Siamese Twins Chang-Eng and Their Children".

They conducted a successful year-long tour in 1853, again bringing two children (Christopher and Katherine). They again justified the tour by saying their motivation was to raise money to support their (by this point, 11) children's education.

On this tour, viewings were like levees and were not elaborate, as the twins and their children usually sat, spoke, and mingled with the audience. Chang and Eng wore American suits and spoke in English about their marriages and families, and they also showed off their wit and political knowledge. They appeared educated and polite, according to biographer Joseph Andrew Orser, and "might have appeared as a distinguished southern family on display except for the fact that no family of distinction would exhibit itself to the public."

In early October 1860 they signed with famed showman P. T. Barnum for a month and exhibited in Barnum's American Museum in New York City. Alongside Zip the Pinhead, they performed for several distinguished guests, including the Prince of Wales; in 1868, they would briefly tour with Zip in the British Isles. Contrary to popular belief, Barnum did not create the Bunkers' careers; in fact, they were competitors in the entertainment business and the twins had already become world-famous from their own tours. The brothers and Barnum did not like each other, and the twins rejected Barnum's offer of a longer, countrywide tour.

They departed New York City on November 12, 1860, and took steamships and crossed Panama by train to arrive in San Francisco on December 6. Californians at the time were in the midst of figuring out how to deal with a recent influx of Chinese immigrants, and the arrival of the Bunkers (as well as two of Eng's sons, Patrick and Montgomery) was put in the spotlight. As usual, Chang and Eng were favorably received by audiences with whom they spoke, though reports of their performances in California took various perspectives on their race and nationality. Newspapers called them "yellow" but also the "greatest of living curiosities" who had "made much noise in the world, and are certainly worth seeing". They left California on February 11, 1861, by which time seven states had seceded from the United States, sparking the American Civil War. The Bunkers likely returned to their Mount Airy homes by April—after gunfire had begun in South Carolina, but before North Carolina seceded on May 20.

=== Civil War metaphor ===
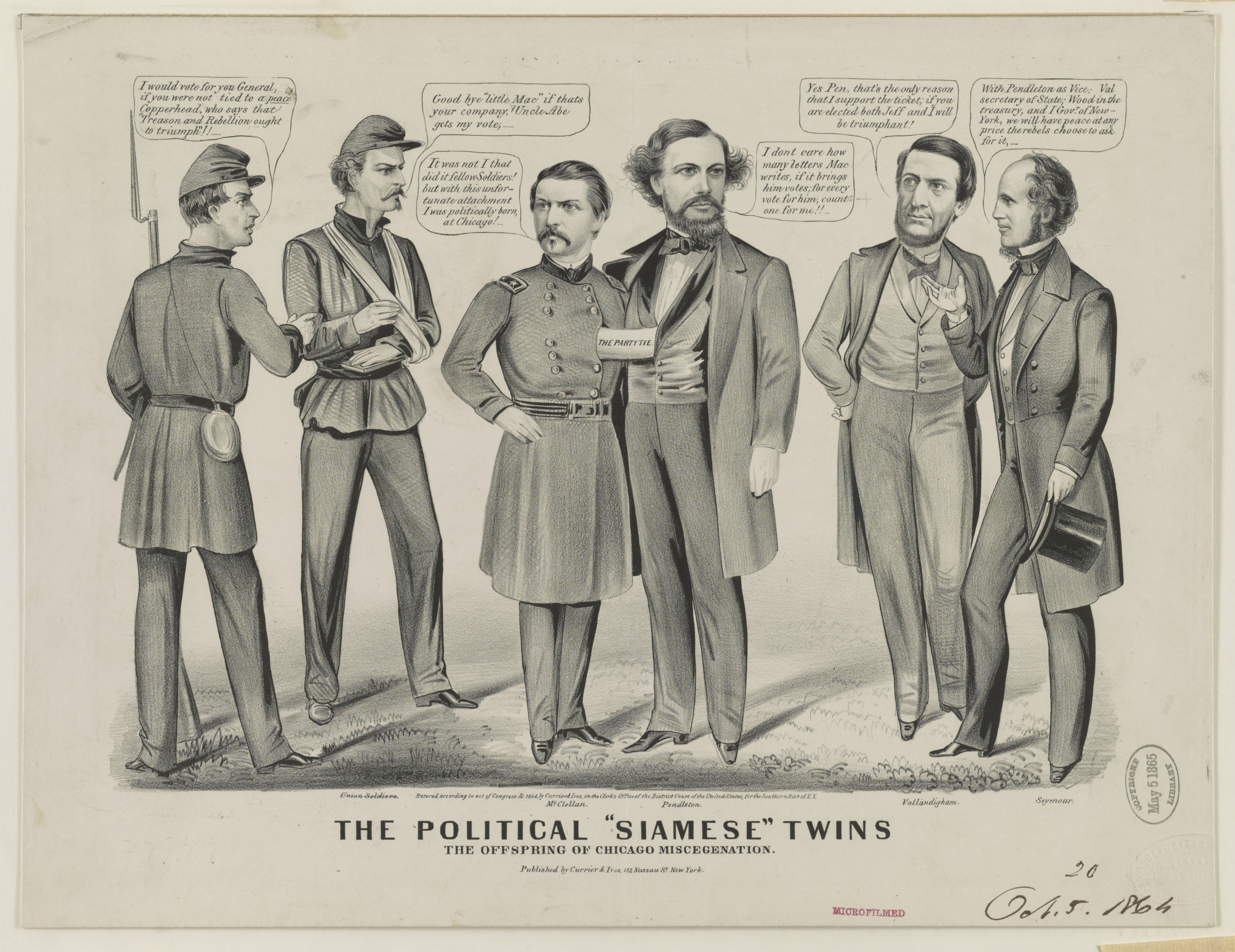
"The Political 'Siamese' Twins, the Offspring of Chicago Miscegenation": This cartoon objects to the 1864 Democratic ticket that combined two men with differing views: George Pendleton opposed the Civil War; George McClellan did not support a ceasefire.

Throughout the Civil War, the twins' conjoined state served in several metaphors. In July 1860, the Louisville Journal chided divisions in the Democratic Party by making the twins out to represent rival factions within the party, split on the extent to which slavery should be federally protected. However, the Bunker brothers were long-time supporters of the Whig Party, and a neighbor wrote to The Fayetteville Observer that they "are not now and never have been Democrats [and] they say they never expect to be Democrats". This neighbor also said that in the 1860 presidential election both twins supported the Tennessean John Bell of the Constitutional Union Party, a candidate popular in northwestern North Carolina whose platform included both support of slavery and of preservation of the union.

More prominently, many newspapers fictitiously wrote that Chang and Eng were at odds with each other on the issue of secession, personifying fears of sectional violence. (Note: For instance, the St. Louis Republican fictitiously (it included the caveat that it "does not vouch for its truth") wrote that disagreements between the Bunker brothers had escalated to their killing each other's children. Orser 2014, p. 149.) The New-York Tribune ran a colorful allegory that claimed to be an account of a dispute between the twins while they were at Barnum's American Museum. It says that Chang, the quarrelsome one, wants the ligament connecting them to be painted black (signifying the key issue of slavery) but that Eng does not. Chang says that his "union" with Eng is to be "dissolved", while a "Dr. Lincoln" [President Lincoln] reasons that a separation surgery would be "dangerous for both parties"". According to Orser, "The united brothers had become symbols of the American union and the promise it offered to its citizens."

=== Final years ===
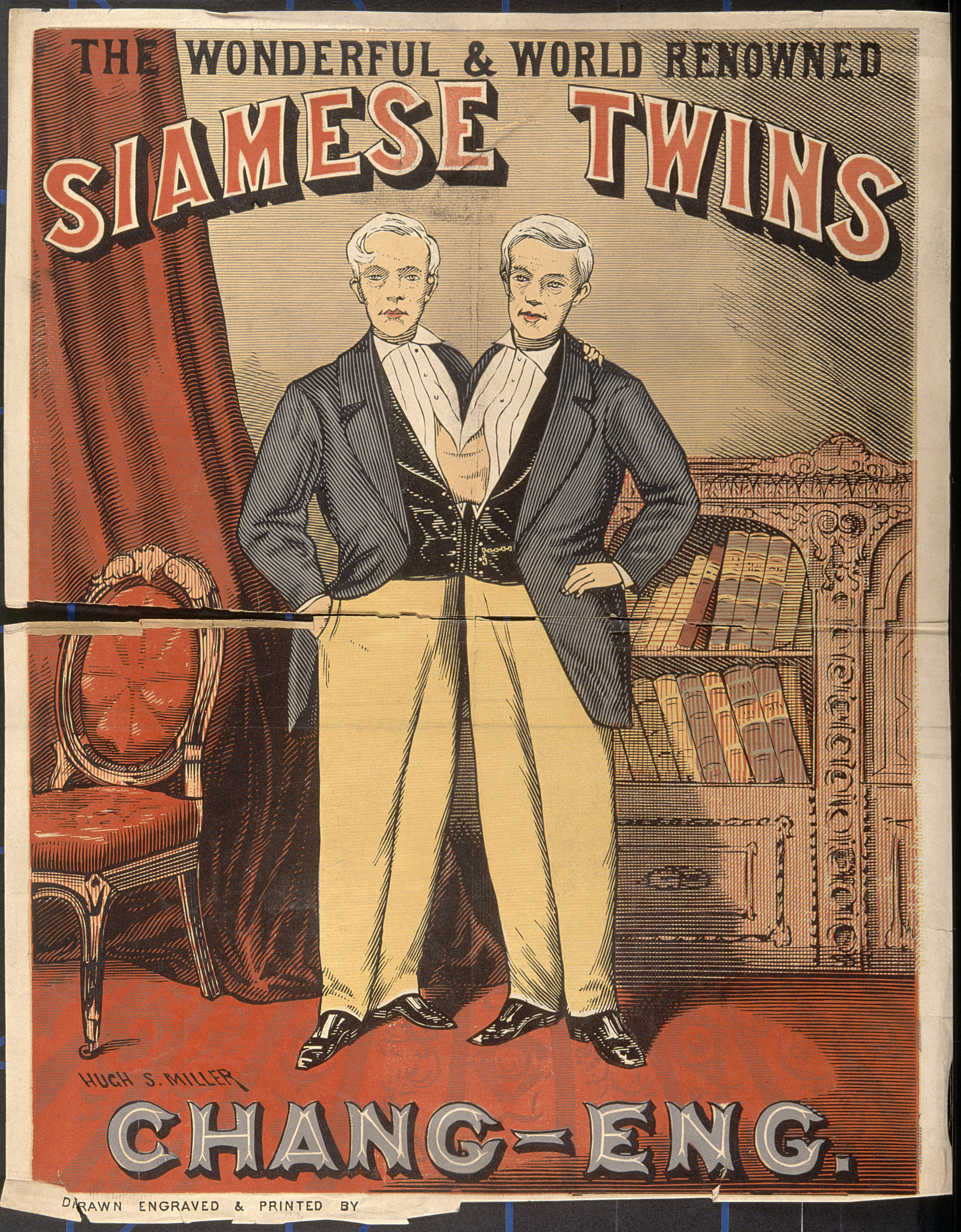
After the Civil War, Northerners received the "Wonderful & World Renowned" twins much more poorly than before.

By the time the Civil War ended in 1865, the twins' finances had suffered (they had lent money that was repaid in worthless Confederate currency) and the people they enslaved were emancipated, so they decided to resume touring.

Northern audiences at this point were not so receptive to the twins—for they had been Confederate slaveholders—so during tours they sympathetically presented themselves as old men, with many children, who only reluctantly supported their state over country and who each had a son hurt in the war, one injured and one captured (serving in the Confederate States Army).

Newspapers disparagingly wrote that the twins had lost "a considerable number of slaves of about the same color of themselves" and claimed that the twins were taking advantage of their audience.

Chang and Eng made a trip to Britain in 1868–69, seeing physicians and chatting in exhibition; their last visit there had been over 30 years before. Chang's daughter Nannie, who had never before been far from home, and Eng's daughter Kate, both in their 20s, came on the trip, from North Carolina to Baltimore and New York, then across the Atlantic to Liverpool and into rural Scotland, later going to Manchester.

In 1870, Chang, Eng, and two sons went to Germany and Russia; they wanted to further explore Europe, but returned home to avoid the developing Franco-Prussian War. On the ship back home, Chang's right side (toward Eng) became paralyzed after he suffered a stroke, and they effectively retired, as Eng cared for Chang. The Bunker estate in 1870 was worth $30,000 in total, equivalent to $763,816 in 2025—two-thirds belonging to Chang.

=== Family ===
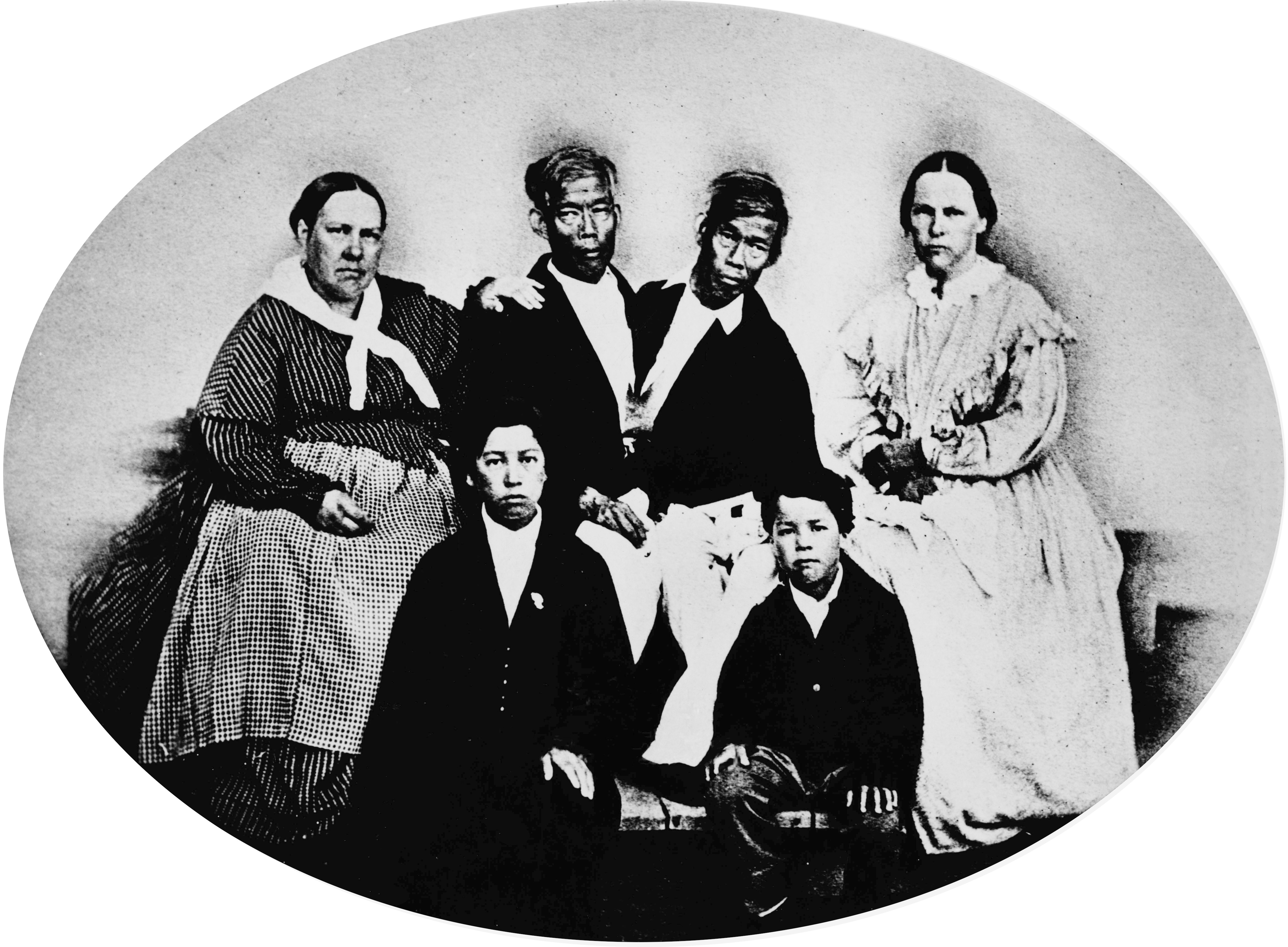
Family portrait by Mathew Brady, c. 1865: (L–R) Sarah, her son Patrick Henry, Eng, Chang, his son Albert, Adelaide

Sarah Yates Bunker was born on December 18, 1822, the fourth child and second daughter of David and Nancy Yates. Sometimes called "Mrs. Eng", she was seen as the simpler sister and uneducated, lived frugally and was a capable chef. She was also described as the "more portly, fair one".

Adelaide Yates Bunker, or "Mrs. Chang", was born on October 11, 1823. Taller and thinner than her older sister, she was said to have "excelled in personal beauty" and to have possessed a more refined taste. It was said that both Chang and Eng favored Sarah; however, according to a contemporary newspaper, "To any but an oriental taste, [Adelaide] was much the prettiest, being, in fact, a handsome and showy brunette."

Both sisters outlived their husbands; Sarah died at age 69 on April 29, 1892, and Adelaide died at age 93 on May 21, 1917.

Chang's and Eng's first children were born within six days of each other: Sarah gave birth to Katherine Marcellus on February 10, 1844, while Adelaide gave birth to Josephine Virginia on February 16. One set of cousins was born eight days apart: Chang's son Christopher and Eng's daughter Julia. Altogether, Chang and Adelaide had 10 children and Eng and Sarah had 11; in total, there were 12 daughters and nine sons; two children were deaf, two died from burns before the age of three, and none were born as twins.

The twins occasionally attended church with their wives. Their children were for some time formally educated, and generally they were seen favorably; a profile of Chang and Eng said the children represented "a credit to their parents and the community in which they live".

As of 2006, descendants of Chang and Eng's 21 children number about 1,500. Much of the extended family still lives in western North Carolina, and the family has hosted annual get-togethers since the 1980s, usually on the last Saturday of June. Chang's descendants include grandson Caleb V. Haynes, an Air Force major general, and his son Vance Haynes, an archaeologist; great-granddaughter Alex Sink, former Chief Financial Officer of Florida and the Democratic nominee for Governor of Florida in 2010; and great-great-granddaughter Caroline Shaw, a composer and the 2013 Pulitzer Prize for Music recipient. Eng's descendants include grandson George F. Ashby, president of the Union Pacific Railroad in the 1940s. The Bunker pedigree contains 11 sets of twins, none conjoined; the first set of twins, Eng's great-grandsons, were also named Chang and Eng.

== Medical condition and deaths ==
At birth, Chang and Eng were healthy xiphopagus twins connected at the sternum by a flexible circular band of flesh and cartilage, about 5 inches (13 cm) long with a maximum circumference of 9 inches (23 cm). Their livers were connected through the band, and only at the middle of the ligament did they share sensation. (Note: An 1829 description reads, "Deviations from the usual forms of nature are almost always universally offensive; but, in this case, neither the personal appearance of the boys, nor the explanation of the phenomenon by which they are united, is calculated to raise an unpleasant emotion." Quigley 2012, p. 23.)

Most physicians who met the twins recommended against surgery for separation, as with medical technology at the time it would have been a fatal procedure. Contemporary medical literature strongly suggests that the twins could have been easily separated today.

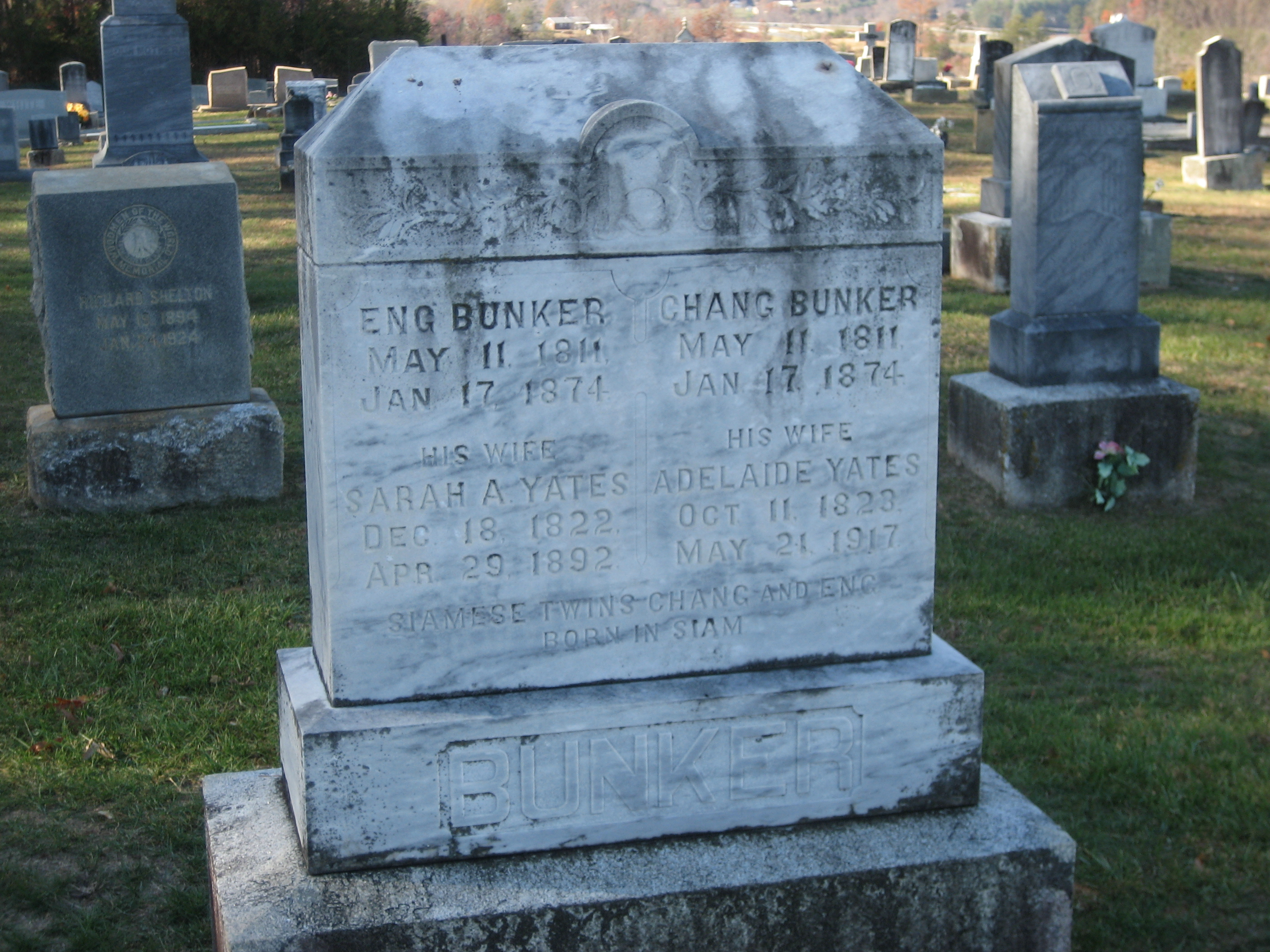
The Bunkers' grave in Mount Airy

While Eng enjoyed good health toward the end of his life, most of Chang's right side became paralyzed in 1870 after his stroke, and eventually his right leg needed to be kept in a sling. From then on, Chang—becoming a heavy drinker—remained in poor health. He contracted bronchitis in January 1874, and the family physician recommended that Chang stay indoors and warm.

On January 15, the Bunkers traveled through cold weather to Eng's house. Chang seemed to have recovered somewhat by the next day but at night was unable to breathe comfortably. On Chang's urging the brothers slept sitting upright on a chair, in front of a fireplace. Eng was healthy physically yet weary from spending the past week with a seriously ill Chang, so he asked to move to their bed after hours of drifting in and out of sleep.

Early in the morning of January 17, one of Eng's sons checked on the sleeping twins. "Uncle Chang is dead," the boy reportedly said to Eng, who responded, "Then I am going!" The family doctor was quickly sent for, but Eng soon died, reportedly just over two hours after his brother's death. The Bunkers had the longest known life-span (62 years) of any conjoined twins in history until 2012, when their record was surpassed by Ronnie and Donnie Galyon (1951–2020). Eng was remembered as a caring supporter of his brother, especially during their final years, when Chang developed severe illnesses. After their deaths, their good friend Jesse Franklin Graves recalled, "[Eng's] kindness was received with the warmest appreciation by Chang, whose disposition was very different from the morose, ill nature so falsely ascribed to him [by the press]."

=== Autopsy ===
Chang and Eng were two of the nineteenth century's most studied human beings. Almost from the moment they stepped off the boat in Boston they were probed, pinched, pictured, and pondered by physicians and other scientists representing the spectrum of learned associations. ... They were a favorite subject of medical journals and scientific speculation.

— Robert Bogdan
Freak Show (1990)

The New York Herald ran a front-page story about the Bunkers' deaths, which attracted public demand for an autopsy as well as the attention of William Pancoast, who successfully petitioned for the opportunity to study the twins. It was rumored that Pancoast and other physicians had offered money to Chang and Eng's widows to inspect the twins, but more likely the doctors pressured the sisters into giving up the bodies by framing this donation as their "duty to science and humanity". The bodies were preserved for two weeks by the cold weather, and then an express train delivered them to the College of Physicians of Philadelphia, where the autopsy was performed and where preliminary findings were presented on February 18 while the autopsy was in progress.

The twins' final autopsy report said that Chang had most likely died of a cerebral blood clot; the cause of Eng's death was left unclear. Pancoast and colleague Harrison Allen attributed it to shock—that is, Eng "died of fright" upon seeing his dead brother—based on the fact that Eng's bladder had distended with urine and his right testicle had retracted. Others who worked on the autopsy suggested alternate theories, most prominently that Eng had died of blood loss as his circulatory system pumped blood through the connecting band into his dead brother's body and received no blood in return. "In the end," wrote academic Cynthia Wu in 2012, "that Eng died of fright prevails not only in the medical record but also in the popular-cultural imagination."

== Legacy ==
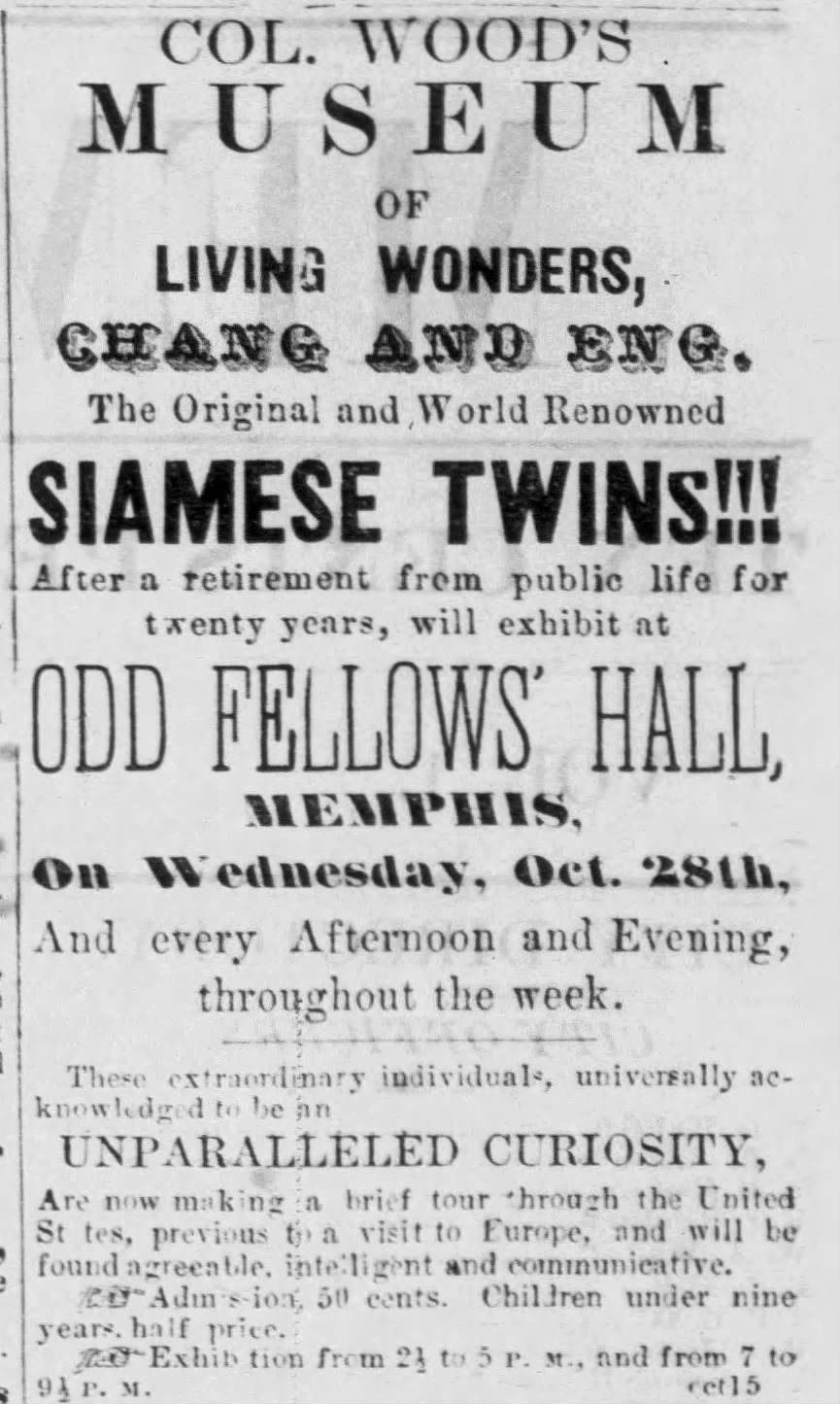
"Siamese Twins!!!" Memphis Evening Ledger, October 29, 1857

The Bunker brothers coined the term "Siamese twins", and their fame made it a synonym for conjoined twins in colloquial use, even referring to those before the Bunkers' lifetime; however, modern researchers see the term as outmoded, preferring "conjoined twins". The phrase "like the Siamese twins" (or variations) was in use as early as October 1829 to describe other conjoined pairs, but over the decades use of the standalone "Siamese twins" became widespread. "Siamese" is sometimes used separately to refer to any conjoined pairs, like 'Siamese standpipes', a type of fire hydrant.

Chang and Eng often continue to be referred to retrospectively as the "original Siamese twins".

Before the Bunkers' bodies were returned to North Carolina for burial (in 1917 they were moved to the cemetery at White Plains Baptist Church outside Mount Airy), doctors took photographs of the connecting tissue and hired sculptor John Casani to make a plaster cast of the twins. The Bunkers' fused livers are preserved in fluid and displayed in a clear jar along with the death cast in Philadelphia's Mütter Museum as a permanent exhibition. A basement room of the Andy Griffith Museum contains an exhibit on the twins. The Circus World Museum houses life-size figures of the twins. The Southern Historical Collection of the University of North Carolina at Chapel Hill keeps the Bunkers' personal papers.

=== In fiction ===
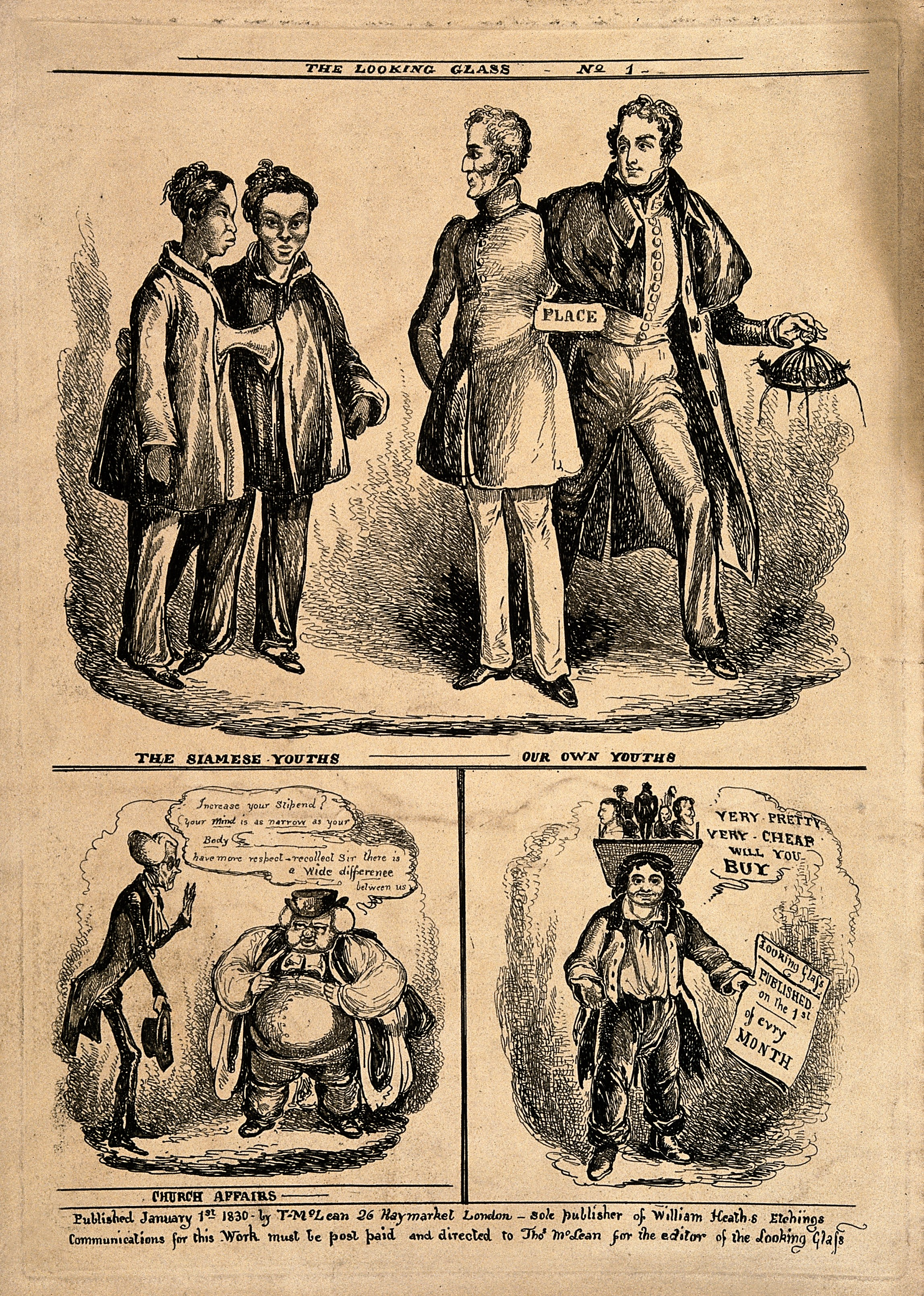
Three works of political satire referencing "the Siamese Youths" by William Heath, 1830

Many anonymous promotional pamphlets were printed depicting the Bunkers in artwork and literature, comprising early fiction pieces on the "Siamese twins"; the twins were used more metaphorically in later works. Edward Bulwer-Lytton's satirical poem The Siamese Twins was published while they toured Britain. Mentioning them in his novels The Confidence-Man and Billy Budd, Herman Melville also alludes to the Bunkers in Moby-Dick.

The anti-socialist political cartoonist Thomas Nast in 1874 drew "The American Twins", in which a worker ("Labor") wears an apron next to a businessman ("Capital") with a sack of money who are joined at the chests with a band labeled "The Real Union". Before the United States entered World War II, Dr. Seuss used a "Siamese Beard" in his 1941 cartoon "The Great U.S. Sideshow" to attach a man with an America First shirt to Nazi Germany.

Mark Twain referenced conjoined twins in several ways, such as by wearing a pink sash connecting him to another man onstage at a New Year's Eve party; in "Personal Habits of the Siamese Twins" (1869), republished as "The Siamese Twins" in his 1875 collection Sketches New and Old, Twain provides an account of the Bunkers' lives, including both true and outlandish anecdotes. This satirical work, with Twain's typical deadpan humor, jokes about, among other things, the twins' different attitudes and their romantic pursuit of the same woman.

The musical Chang & Eng, directed by Ekachai Uekrongtham, has themes of open-mindedness and interdependence, and it opened in Singapore in 1997. Chang & Eng (2000), the debut novel of Darin Strauss, is a fictionalized account of the Bunker brothers' lives based on some historical context. Chang is the narrator in God's Fool (2002), Mark Slouka's first novel, and he has a hindsight letting him know the importance of future events. The story of Eng and Chang is retold via sock puppets in the 2009 film Trash Humpers directed by Harmony Korine. The play I Dream of Chang and Eng by playwright Philip Kan Gotanda, a "reimagining" of the twins' lives that departs somewhat from truthfulness, was workshopped and performed at UC Berkeley in 2011. Chang and Eng (played by Danial Son and Yusaku Komori) are featured in the musical biopic The Greatest Showman (2017) about the early years of the Barnum & Bailey Circus.

== See also ==
- List of conjoined twins

== Notes and references ==
Explanatory notes

Bibliography

- Bogdan, Robert (1990), Freak Show: Presenting Human Oddities for Amusement and Profit, University of Chicago Press, ISBN 978-0-226-06312-6
- Dreger, Alice Domurat (2005), One of Us: Conjoined Twins and the Future of Normal, Harvard University Press, ISBN 978-0-674-01825-9
- Huang, Yunte (2018), Inseparable: The Original Siamese Twins and their Rendezvous with American History, W. W. Norton & Company, ISBN 978-0-87140-447-3
- Newman, Cathy (June 2006). "Together Forever". National Geographic. National Geographic Society. Archived from the original on March 6, 2012.
- Nickell, Joe (2005), Secrets of the Sideshows, University Press of Kentucky, ISBN 0813123585, OCLC 65377460
- Orser, Joseph Andrew (2014), The Lives of Chang & Eng: Siam's Twins in Nineteenth-Century America, University of North Carolina Press, ISBN 978-1-4696-1830-2
- Quigley, Christine (2012), "Bunker, Chang and Eng", Conjoined Twins: An Historical, Biological and Ethical Issues Encyclopedia, McFarland & Company, pp. 22–40, ISBN 978-1-4766-0323-0
- Spencer, Rowena (2003), Conjoined Twins: Developmental Malformations and Clinical Implications, Johns Hopkins University Press, ISBN 978-0-8018-7070-5
- Wu, Cynthia (2012), Chang and Eng Reconnected, Temple University Press, ISBN 978-1-4399-0869-3
