= Chang & Eng (novel) =

Book by Darin Strauss

- First edition
- Author: Darin Strauss
- Language: English
- Genre: Literary Fiction
- Published: June 2000 E. P. Dutton
- Publication place: United States
- Media type: Print (hardback & paperback)
- Pages: 336
- Awards: The Alex Award for Fiction
- ISBN: 978-0452281097

Chang & Eng is a book by American author Darin Strauss, published in 2000. It was a nominee for multiple awards, including the Pen Hemingway, the Barnes & Noble Discover Award, the New York Public Library's Literary Lions Award, and a winner of the American Library Association's Alex Award.

== Summary ==
Strauss fictionalizes the lives of Chang and Eng Bunker, the first famous conjoined twins, as they travel from old Siam (Thailand) and find fame in New York and, eventually, the Civil War South.

== Plot ==
In 1811 Chang and Eng Bunker are born, twins joined at the chest by a seven-inch-long ligament, in old Siam (Thailand). (This ligament contains a part of their stomach, the only organ they share.) Besides this connecting band, each twin is completely separate from the other: each has a separate personality, separate desires, is a separate individual. Eng, the more shy and bookish twin, narrates their story. When the book opens, Chang & Eng face their last night—Eng awakens, sees that Chang is dead, and knows that he will die tonight, too. Then the book jumps back in time to their birth, occurring on their parents' houseboat on the Melkong River. Their mother does not tell them they are different, and they assume that all babies are attached.

Soon, the King of Siam condemns them to death—as a double-omen—but he changes his mind upon seeing what a glorious sight they are. He exploits them as freaks. In 1825, an amoral American promoter brings them to America, beginning their life of celebrity.

Soon, the brothers become famous in their circus act, before getting caught up in the Civil War, marrying two sisters, and fathering over 20 children.

Eng, a bookish reader of Shakespeare, becomes a leader (or a tool) of the temperance movement and, from birth to death, wishes desperately to be separated. Chang is charming, a heavy drinker, and he is married to the woman that Eng—in secret—loves, too.

== Reception ==
Chang & Eng was a commercial and critical success, reaching #3 on the New York Post's bestsellers list. Writing in The Guardian, writer and critic Frank Delaney said: "This is an assured and sweeping book...The novel grows and grows in stature. Never less than poignant, it becomes almost unbearably moving." In The New York Times, critic Michiko Kakutani called it "A spirited and promising debut." Writer Andrew Santella, in The New York Times Book Review, found the novel "a story of heroic longing." He continued, "Strauss's novel—its humor, its humanity, its aching sadness—makes for a fine memorial." The Wall Street Journal, called the novel "Bold… Imaginative… A daring story from a brave new voice in literature." And, in The New Yorker, the book was called "as lyrical as it is daring."

Chang & Eng made a number of year-end best lists, in such venues as Entertainment Weekly, Newsweek, The New York Times Book Review and Los Angeles Times Book Review, as well as in United Kingdom papers The Times and Daily Mail.

The rights to the novel were optioned to Disney, for the director Julie Taymor; the actor Gary Oldman purchased the rights from Disney. Strauss and Oldman together wrote a script to adapt Chang & Eng for the screen.

== Awards ==
Chang & Eng received the 2001 American Library Association Alex Award for fiction, and was a finalist for a number of other awards, including the Barnes & Noble Discover Award and the New York Public Library's Literary Lions Award.
