= Chang & Eng =

- Music: Ken Low
- Lyrics: Ken Low
- Book: Ming Wong
- Productions: Singapore 1997, 1998, 1999, 2000, 2001, 2002, Asian Tour 2002

Chang & Eng is a Singaporean musical theatre production directed by Ekachai Uekrongtham based on the lives of the Siamese twins, Chang and Eng Bunker. The music and lyrics were by Ken Low, with the book by Ming Wong, costumes by Niphon Tuntiyothin, set design by Thoranisorn Pitikul, lighting by Thio Lay Hoon, orchestral arrangement by Iskandar Ismail and choral direction by Babes Condes. The musical was first performed in 1997, rerun in subsequent years until 2002 and has since travelled around Asia. Performers such as RJ Rosales, Robin Goh and Edmund Toh have been cast as Chang and Eng, and writer-composer Ken Low has a cameo as the King of Siam in some productions.

Chang and Eng also became the first English Language Musical to be performed in the People's Republic of China between 9th - 11 December 1997 at the Century Theatre, Beijing.

The musical focuses on the lives of Chang and Eng, from their troubled childhood, seen as outcasts by children in Siam but reassured by their mother Nok, to their journey to New York as exhibits managed by Captain Abel Coffin and their settling down with Adelaide and Sallie Yates in North Carolina.

== Major characters ==
- Chang (tenor/baritone) - one half of the conjoined twins and the more optimistic and confident of the two
- Eng (tenor/baritone) - the other brother and the more moody of the two, dependent on his more confident twin for support
- Nok (mezzo-soprano)- the twins' mother who helps them to cope with the mockery and rejection of their peers
- Captain Abel Coffin (tenor/baritone) - The opportunistic American merchant who takes the twins to exhibit them in New York
- Adelaide Yates (mezzo-soprano) - One of the two Yates sisters who goes on to fall in love with and later marry Chang
- Sallie Yates (mezzo-soprano) - the other Yates sister who falls in love and later marries Eng
- King Rama III (baritone) - the King of Siam
- Midwife (mezzo-soprano) - the "Grand Midwife of the West" who delivers the 21 children of the twins' wives.

== Synopsis ==
Act 1

The musical begins in New York, 1829 where curious crowds gather to witness a public display of Chang and Eng, the Siamese twins joined at the chest (Eighth Wonder of the World). The twins' manager, Captain Abel Coffin, lures the crowds in as he prepares to unveil the exhibit, billed as the Eight Wonder of the World, for the first time. Backstage, before the exhibition, the twins discuss their future in America, Chang with visions of grandeur and Eng with apprehension (From Now On).

We are then transported to the twins' childhood in Siam, 1819. At the age of eight, Young Chang and Young Eng are two healthy boys who have managed to adapt to living as conjoined twins. However, they are constantly mocked by other children and not accepted by them (Stuck Together). As a severe cholera epidemic breaks out in Siam, the twins are denounced as an evil omen. The twins' mother Nok continues to love, protect and reassure Chang and Eng through their difficulties (Mai Phen Rai (Never Mind)).

Ten years later, Chang and Eng have become shrewd teenage businessmen, selling duck eggs to provide for their family. Their lives take an unexpected turn when they are summoned to appear before the King Rama III of Siam in the Royal Palace who is delighted to meet them and sends them as envoys to the Kingdom of Cochin China (Pride and Joy).

By this time, they have caught the attention of Captain Abel Coffin, an opportunistic American merchant who takes them to America, leaving behind their home and their mother.

Act 2

The day after the exhibition, paper boys crowd the streets of New York with breaking news about the Siamese Twins' arrival, their exhibition and speculation about whether or not they are a hoax (Read All About It). Coffin offers free shows to prove the twins are not a hoax, and as part of his publicity plan has the twins examined by a team of prominent surgeons in order to have the twins' condition authenticated and for the doctors to see whether separation is an option (How Extraordinary).

Act 3

Act 3 opens when the twins declare their independence from Captain Coffin to be their own men. In 1840, they quit going on exhibit and settle down in North Carolina to lead a normal life. They become naturalized U.S. citizens, adopting Bunker as their new surname. They meet two sisters, Sallie and Adelaide Yates, at a garden wedding reception. Afterwards, both sisters find themselves drawn to the twins and share their feelings with each other (Four Could Be Heavenly). Facing opposition for their relationships (Chang with Adelaide and Eng with Sallie), they decide to let it run its course (Maybe it Needs a Little Time). Consumed by their feelings for the sisters, Chang and Eng begin to yearn for lives apart (If Only). However, they finally settle down, and before long the sisters are pregnant with the children of the twins (The Grand Midwife of the West).

However, as the twins get older, their personality differences deepen and their desire to lead separate lives grows stronger. This is worsened by the domestic quarrels between their wives and children. In the meantime, The American Civil War looms in the background as the tension between the northern and southern states intensifies (Divided). At the end of the Civil War, Chang and Eng find themselves stricken by poverty and unwillingly return to make public appearances to support their large family. The musical ends with the twins near-death, reminiscing about the words their mother told them as children (Mai Phen Rai (Never Mind) Reprise).

== Main actors (Beijing performance) ==
- Chang Bunker: Edmund Toh
- Eng Bunker: Jeremy Sing Seng Kwang
- Nok: Selena Tan
- Adelaide Yates: Pippa Birkbeck
- Sallie Yates: Mary-Anne McCormack
- Coffin: Patrick Gallo
- King of Siam: Ken Low

== Song list ==
Act One

- Eighth Wonder Of The World
- From Now On
- Stuck Together
- Mai Phen Rai (Never Mind)
- Royal Thai Dance (Instrumental)
- Pride & Joy

Act Two

- Read All About It
- How Extraordinary!

Act Three

- (Four Could Be) Heavenly
- Maybe It Just Needs A Little Time
- If Only
- The Grand Midwife Of The West
- Divided
- Mai Phen Rai (Never Mind) Reprise
