= James Davis =

James, Jim, or Jimmy Davis may refer to:

== Entertainment ==
- James Davis (musical group), musical group signed to Motown
- J. Gunnis Davis (1873–1937), actor and director, whose directorial work was credited as James Davis
- Jim Davis (actor) (1909–1981), American actor
- James Davis (actor), Broadway performer
- Jim Davis (cartoonist) (born 1945), creator of the Garfield comic strip
- James B. Davis (musician) (1917–2007), American musician
- James "Thunderbird" Davis (1938–1992), American Texas blues and electric blues guitarist, singer and songwriter
- Jimmy Davis (songwriter) (1915–1997), co-writer of the song "Lover Man (Oh, Where Can You Be?)"
- Jimmy Davis, singer-songwriter for 1980s rock band Jimmy Davis & Junction
- James Davis (critic) (1853–1907), pen-name Owen Hall, Irish-born theatre writer and theatre critic
- James Davis (satirist) (c. 1706–1755), Welsh doctor and satirist
- James G. Davis (1931–2016), American artist
- Jim Davis (radio presenter), British radio presenter
- Boo Boo Davis (James Davis, born 1943), American electric blues musician

== Sports ==
=== American football ===
- James Davis (cornerback) (born 1957), NFL cornerback and safety
- James Davis (linebacker) (born 1979), NFL linebacker
- Jim Davis (gridiron football) (born 1981), American football player
- James Davis (running back) (born 1986), American football halfback

=== Baseball ===
- Jumbo Davis (James J. Davis, 1861–1921), American baseball player
- Jim Davis (pitcher) (1924–1995), baseball pitcher
- Jim Davis (third baseman) (fl. 1945), American baseball player

=== Other sports ===
- James Davis (Surrey cricketer) (fl. 1840s), English cricketer
- James Davis (Kent cricketer) (died 1870), English cricketer
- Jim Davis (rugby league) (1887–1934), Australian rugby league footballer of the 1900s and 1910s
- Jim Davis (basketball player) (1941–2018), American basketball player
- Jim Davis (basketball coach) (born 1946), American college basketball coach
- James Davis (sprinter) (born 1976), American sprinter
- James Davis, middle-distance runner, 1938 mile run All-American for the North Carolina Tar Heels track and field team
- Jimmy Davis (footballer) (1982–2003), Manchester United footballer
- James Davis (fencer) (born 1991), British fencer
- James Davis (footballer, born 1995), Equatoguinean footballer

== Politics ==
- James Davis (printer) (1721–1785), first postmaster of North Carolina
- James Davis (Australian politician) (c. 1811–1859), politician in Alberton, Victoria, Australia
- James Davis (Iowa politician) (1826–1897), Iowa state senator
- James H. Davis (Texas politician) (1853–1940), United States representative from Texas
- James J. Davis (1873–1947), United States senator from Pennsylvania and Secretary of Labor
- James C. Davis (1895–1981), United States representative from Georgia
- James N. Davis, member of the Illinois House of Representatives
- Jimmie Davis (1899–2000), musician and governor of Louisiana
- Jim Davis (Florida politician) (born 1957), United States representative from Florida
- Jim Davis (Indiana politician) (1928–2012), Indiana state representative
- Jim Davis (North Carolina politician) (born 1947), North Carolina state senator
- James E. Davis (New York politician) (1962–2003), assassinated New York City politician
- Jim Davis (Ohio politician) (1935–2011), Republican member of the Ohio House of Representatives

== Religion ==
- James J. Davis (bishop) (1852–1926), Roman Catholic bishop
- James Peter Davis (1904–1988), American Roman Catholic archbishop
- James Levert Davis, African Methodist Episcopal bishop

== Law ==
- James Z. Davis (1943–2016), judge on the Utah Court of Appeals
- James Edward Davis (1817–1887), barrister, magistrate and author
- James E. Davis (Los Angeles police officer) (1889–1949), Los Angeles chief of police

== Business ==
- Jim Davis (businessman) (born 1943), chairman of New Balance Athletic Shoe, Inc. and founder of Major League Lacrosse
- James M. Davis (born 1948), former chief financial officer of Stanford Financial Group who pled guilty for his role in a US$7 billion Ponzi scheme

== Other ==
- James Davis (VC) (1835–1893), Scottish Victoria Cross recipient
- James Davis (escaped convict) (1807–1889), aka "Duramboi", escaped convict who lived with Aboriginals
- James A. Davis (1929–2016), sociologist
- James B. Davis (general) (born 1935), U.S. Air Force general
- Jim Limber Davis, mulatto boy who was briefly a ward of Jefferson Davis, president of the Confederate States of America
- James Davis (mariner) (1575–c. 1620), English ship captain and author
- James William Davis, British naturalist
- Jim Davis (university administrator), president of the University of Texas at Austin
- J. C. Davis (James Colin Davis, 1940–2021), British historian

== Other uses ==
- USS James L. Davis (1861), sailing bark acquired by the Union Navy during the American Civil War

== See also ==
- Jamie Davis (disambiguation)
- Jimmy Davies (disambiguation)
- James Davies (disambiguation)
- Jim Davies (disambiguation)
- Jimmy Davies (disambiguation)
