= Jimmy Davies =

Jimmy Davies may refer to:

- Jimmy Davies (racing driver) (1929–1966), American racecar driver in Champ cars, and midgets
- Jimmy Davies (RAF officer) (1913–1940), American airman in World War Two
- Jimmy Davies (football manager), English football manager

== See also ==
- James Davies (disambiguation)
- Jim Davies (disambiguation)
- James Davis (disambiguation)
