= Naugatuck River Review =

- Discipline: Literary magazine
- Language: English
- Edited by: Lori Desrosiers

Publication details
- History: 2008-present
- Publisher: Lenora Press (United States)
- Frequency: Biannually

Standard abbreviations
- ISO 4: Naugatuck River Rev.

Indexing
- ISSN: 1944-0952
- OCLC no.: 262986615

Links
- Journal homepage

Naugatuck River Review (NRR) is an American national literary magazine named after the Naugatuck River in Connecticut. Founded in 2008, it publishes narrative poetry. The headquarters is in Westfield, Massachusetts.

== Awards ==
Each year Naugatuck River Review hosts a Narrative Poetry Prize. NRR subscribes to the ethical code for contests laid out by the Council of Literary Magazines and Presses. The judge for the 2012 prize is Pamela Uschuk. Past judges have included Patricia Smith, Patrick Donnelly, and Lesléa Newman.

== Past contributors ==
Edward Byrne, Ernie Wormwood, Laurie Junkins, José Gouveia, Steven Riel, Terry Lucas, Wyn Cooper, Diane Lockward, Alan King, Laurie Ann Guerrero, Sally Rosen Kindred, Marie-Elizabeth Mali, Naomi Benaron, José B. Gonzalez, Monica Hand, Daniel Nathan Terry, Taylor Mali, Richard Vargas, Tim Mayo, Marge Piercy, Truth Thomas, Janet Jennings, Christel Warren, Monica A. Hand, Lyn Lifshin, Lucille Lang Day, and Tara Betts.

== See also ==
- List of literary magazines
