= Horse Creek, California =

Unincorporated community in California, United States

- Unincorporated community
- Location within California Location within the United States
- Coordinates: 41°49′26″N 122°59′49″W
- Country: United States
- State: California
- County: Siskiyou
- Elevation: 1,627 ft (496 m)
- Time zone: UTC-8 (Pacific (PST))
  - Summer (DST): UTC-7 (PDT)
- Area code: 530
- GNIS feature ID: 1658780

Horse Creek is an unincorporated community in Siskiyou County, California, United States. Horse Creek is located along California State Route 96, 19 miles (31 km) west-northwest of Yreka.

== The Brite Brothers ==
On August 29, 1936, ex-convicts John and Coke Brite shot and killed Siskiyou County Deputy Martin Lange, constable Joe Clark and visitor Fred Seaborn in a drunken haze near the isolated cabin where they lived with their parents. The brothers had beaten up the elderly Seaborn and his friend, Horse Creek resident Charley Baker, with the latter, who hoped to chase them off from the rented cabin, having used it for free storage before. Seaborn, a retired naval officer and the harbor master of the port of Vallejo, California, was in Horse Creek to hunt deer with Baker. After the incident, the Brite brothers hid out in the Siskiyou Mountains for three weeks in fear of Siskiyou County's reputation for lynching murderers. They secretly gave themselves up to Siskiyou County District Attorney James G. Davis, who, along with Dr. Earl Harris, drove them to Folsom Prison for their safety. Davis, a native American, refused to prosecute, due to conflicting testimony of witnesses, believing they had been set up and were justified in self-defense for being set upon in the dead of night as they lay sleeping outdoors, Davis was soon to be voted out of office. The Brite Brothers were convicted and sentenced to death; however, appeals commuted the sentence to life in prison. They were both paroled in 1951, after efforts of author Erle Stanley Gardner's 'Court of Last Resort', but were soon back in prison, where they died.
