= Rebecca Dimplez Ijeoma =

Nigerian-American music executive

- Other names: Dimplez, Dimplez Ijeoma
- Citizenship: Nigerian American
- Education: University of Arizona
- Occupation: Music Executive
- Employer: Capitol Records
- Title: Senior Vice President

Rebecca ‘Dimplez’ Ijeoma also known as Dimplez is a Nigerian-American music executive, currently serving as senior vice president at Capitol Music Group. She is also the founder of the marketing consultancy firm IJEOMA. Her career includes roles at Capitol Records, Motown Records, Universal Music Group, BWR PR, and Uproxx.

== Career ==
At Capitol Music Group Dimplez managed digital marketing efforts for Capitol Records, Motown Records, and Priority records working with Offset, Ice Spice, Marcus Mumford, Doechii, Ne-Yo, Stefflon Don, and Quality Control Music. She also involved in the signing of artists including Queen Naija, Rich Homie Quan and JAMESDAVIS.

In July 2018, Dimplez founded her own agency IJEOMA, and represented clients including DJ Premier, Tobi Lou, Lee Daniels, Tyra Banks, and Tyrese. She was involved in the first posthumous Gang Starr release and led lifestyle marketing and development for RCA Records signees Flo Milli, Tone Stith and Nnena.

== Recognitions ==
In 2011, Dimplez was nominated at the Billboard Women In Music

In 2022 She was announced among the honorees who have made “an invaluable impact at the Inaugural Give Her FlowHERS Awards Gala an initiative of Femme It Forward. She was also listed in the Billboard’s 2022 R&B/Hip-Hop Power Players an annual list that honours executives across Music Genres

In 2023, Rebecca ‘Dimplez’ Ijeoma alongside Temi Adeniji was included in 2023 Billboard's Women in Music list ahead of the Billboard Women in Music Awards
