= James Davies =

James Davies may refer to:

== Sports ==
- James Davies (footballer, born 1845) (1845–c. 1910), Wrexham F.C. and Wales footballer
- James Davies (cyclist, born 1906) (1906–1999), Canadian Olympic cyclist
- James Davies (cyclist, born 1934) (1934–2020), Canadian Olympic cyclist
- James Davies (jockey), European steeplechase rider in the 2007 Cheltenham Gold Cup
- Jamie Davies (born 1974), English racing driver
- Jim Davies (rugby) (c. 1886-?), Welsh rugby union, and rugby league footballer of the 1900s, 1910s and 1920s, and rugby league coach of the 1920s
- James Davies (rugby union) (born 1990), Welsh rugby union footballer of the 2010s
- James Davies (Australian footballer) (born 1982), Australian rules footballer

== Military ==
- James Llewellyn Davies (1886–1917), Welsh recipient of the Victoria Cross
- Jimmy Davies (RAF officer) (1913–1940), first American airman killed in World War II combat

== Politics ==
- James J. Davis (1873–1947), born James John Davies, American politician
- James Davies (politician) (born 1980), British politician

== Other ==
- James Kitchener Davies (1902–1952), Welsh-language writer
- James Chowning Davies (1918–2012), American sociologist and professor of political science
- James Conway Davies (1891–1971), Welsh historian and palaeographer
- James Davies (Iago ap Dewi) (1800–1869), Welsh poet and printer
- James Davies (Baptist minister) (1767–1860), Welsh Baptist minister
- James Davies (schoolmaster) (1765–1849), Welsh schoolmaster
- James Davies (headmaster) (1820–1883), English classical scholar and cleric
- James Eirian Davies (1918–1998), Welsh poet and Methodist minister
- Sir James Ackworth Davies (1845–1906), member of the Indian Civil Service and judge
- James Pinson Labulo Davies (1828–1906), Nigerian businessman, naval officer, statesman, and philanthropist

== See also ==
- Jimmy Davies (disambiguation)
- Jim Davies (disambiguation)
- James Davis (disambiguation)
