= Jim Davies =

Jim Davies may refer to:

== Sports ==
- Jim Davies (footballer) (1926–2010), Australian rules footballer
- Jim Davies (rugby) (1882–1971), Welsh rugby union, and rugby league footballer of the 1900s, 1910s and 1920s, and rugby league coach of the 1920s
- Jimmy Davies (racing driver) (1929–1966), American racecar driver in Champ cars, and midgets

== Other ==
- Jim Davies (computer scientist), Professor of Software Engineering, University of Oxford
- Jim Davies (cognitive scientist), professor at Carleton University
- Jim Davies (musician) (born 1973), guitarist for bands The Prodigy and Pitchshifter
- Jimmy Davies (RAF officer) (1913–1940), first American-born airman to die in World War II combat

== See also ==
- Jimmy Davies (disambiguation)
- James Davies (disambiguation)
- James Davis (disambiguation)
