= Memory Piece =

2024 novel by Lisa Ko

- Author: Lisa Ko
- Publisher: Riverhead Books
- Publication date: March 19, 2024
- Pages: 304
- ISBN: 9780593542101
- Preceded by: The Leavers

Memory Piece is a 2024 novel by American writer Lisa Ko, published by Riverhead Books. It follows three Asian American women growing up New York City through the dawn of the internet and toward a dystopian future. Ko began writing the novel in 2016 shortly after selling the manuscript for her debut, The Leavers. It was named a Best Book of 2024 by Vogue.

== Synopsis ==
The novel follows three Asian American friends who meet on the Fourth of July at a barbecue in the eighties: Giselle Chin, a performance artist; Jackie Ong, a tech entrepreneur; and Ellen Ng, a community organizer and activist. It traces their coming of age in New Jersey and New York City through the dot-com bubble and far into a dystopian future in the 2040s. The novel's title refers to Giselle's practice of writing down her memories every day and later burning them.

== Influences ==
Ko's urgency to write the novel was informed by recent concerns in the United States like book censorship and historical revisionism, as well as modern problems endemic to social media, technology, and artificial intelligence. In writing Giselle, the performance artist, Ko was drawn to the works of Tehching Hsieh, On Kawara, and Adrian Piper. Books she found particularly inspirational were The Flamethrowers by Rachel Kushner, Innocents and Others by Dana Spiotta, and After Kathy Acker by Chris Kraus. Ko also researched zine culture in the nineties to inform the novel's partial setting in the early internet age.

== Critical reception ==
Kirkus Reviews received the novel lukewarmly relative to Ko's debut, The Leavers, saying that it "fails to whip up much narrative tension" and that "the book’s elaborate conceptual structure dominates the characters who inhabit it." Publishers Weekly found the novel's structure similarly "disjointed" but found satisfaction in the "final act in the 2040s, when America is an authoritarian police state."

Many publications, like The Guardian, lauded Ko's speculative approach to modern issues like gentrification, policing, wealth inequality, and technology. The New York Times called the novel "socially astute and formally innovative", as well as "giddy with women's liberation". The Atlantic and The Washington Post appreciated the novel's ambition both in its subject matter and its triptych of characters.

Barack Obama included the novel on his 2024 summer reading list.

== Awards ==
Year	Award	Category	Result	Ref.
2024	Joyce Carol Oates Literary Prize	—	Longlisted	
2024	New American Voices Award	—	Longlisted	
