= Fabienne Josaphat =

Haitian-American novelist

- Born: Haiti
- Alma mater: Florida International University
- Occupation: Author
- Writing career
- Genre: Fiction
- Notable awards: Bellwether Prize (2023)
- Website: fabiennejosaphat.com

Fabienne Josaphat (born Haiti) is an American novelist. She was longlisted for a Aspen Words Literary Prize and won the Bellwether Prize for Socially Engaged Fiction in 2023.

The daughter of a lawyer who was imprisoned during the reign of Francois Duvalier, Josaphat studied at Florida International University and lives in South Florida.

== Selected published works ==
- Dancing in the Baron's Shadow. Los Angeles, CA: Unnamed Press. 2016. ISBN 978-1-939419-57-6.
- Kingdom of No Tomorrow. Chapel Hill, North Carolina: Algonquin Books. December 3, 2024. ISBN 978-1-64375-588-5.
