= Bellwether Prize =

U.S. literary award

PEN / Bellwether Prize for Socially Engaged Fiction
- Nickname: Bellwether Prize
- Status: Active
- Genre: Literary award (Award for unpublished fiction that addresses social justice issues)
- Date: 2000; 26 years ago
- Frequency: Bi-annually
- Country: United States
- Founder: Barbara Kingsolver
- Most recent: 2023
- Previous event: 2021
- Next event: 2025 (Note: Although, announced in 2025 as deferred.)
- Organiser: PEN America
- Prize money: US$25,000
- Fabienne Josaphat

The Bellwether Prize, officially the PEN / Bellwether Prize for Socially Engaged Fiction, formerly known as the Bellwether Prize for Fiction, is a biennial award given by PEN America and Barbara Kingsolver to a U.S. citizen for a previously unpublished work of fiction that address issues of social justice. The prize was established by Kingsolver and is funded by her. Winning authors receive a US$25,000 award and a publishing contract, from which they receive royalties.

Submissions are judged by a panel of authors whose work shows themes of social change. Authors who have served as judges include: Russell Banks, Martin Espada, Terry Karten, Maxine Hong Kingston, Ursula K. Le Guin, Barry Lopez, Toni Morrison, Ruth Ozeki, Grace Paley, and Anna Quindlen.

In May 2011, PEN America (formerly the PEN American Center) announced it would administer the prize, known as the PEN/Bellwether Prize. The award is one of many PEN awards sponsored by International PEN affiliates in over 145 PEN centres around the world. PEN America awards were characterized in 2005 as among the "major" American literary prizes.

== Winners ==
Bellwether Prize winners
Year	Author	Title	Notes
2000	Donna Gershten	Kissing the Virgin's Mouth	
2002	Gayle Brandeis	The Book of Dead Birds	
2004	Marjorie Kowalski Cole	Correcting the Landscape	
2006	Hillary Jordan	Mudbound	
2008	Heidi W. Durrow	The Girl Who Fell from the Sky	
2010	Naomi Benaron	Running the Rift	
2012	Susan Nussbaum	Good Kings Bad Kings	
2014	Ron Childress	And West Is West	
2016	Lisa Ko	The Leavers	
2019	Katherine Seligman	At the Edge of the Haight	
2021	Jamila Minnicks	Moonrise Over New Jessup	
2023	Fabienne Josaphat	Kingdom of No Tomorrow	
2025	Not awarded		

== See also ==
- Bellwether
