= James G. Davis =

American contemporary artist (1931–2016)

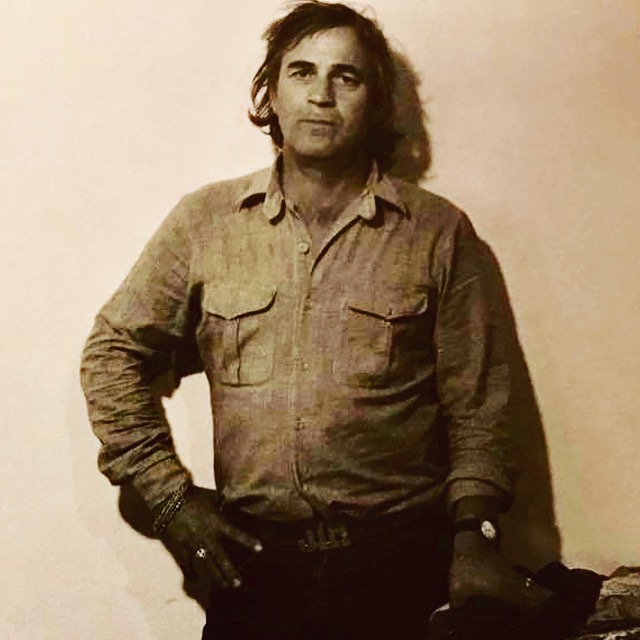
- Born: June 20, 1931; Springfield, Missouri, U.S.
- Died: September 6, 2016 (aged 85); Oracle, Arizona, U.S.
- Education: Wichita State University
- Occupation: Artist
- Known for: printmaking; painting; sculpture
- Notable work: Red Day at Blueberry Bay, The White Moose Bar, Berlin Blumen
- Spouse: Mary Anne Davis
- Children: 1
- Website: jamesgdavis.org

James G. Davis (June 20, 1931 – September 28, 2016) was an American contemporary artist best known for his intricate paintings and works on paper. He was acclaimed for his figurative pieces that explore issues of gender and social status, along with mythological and historical references that often have a metaphorical twist.

== Early life ==
Davis was born in Springfield, Missouri as one of six brothers. His mother died when he was three years old. He spent a year of his life in an orphanage. At the age of eleven, Davis was involved in a train accident that resulted in a long hospitalization and recovery period which led him to discover self-expression through drawing. He dropped out of high school and then traveled the country from 1947 to 1950. He worked various odd jobs including one year working in a toy factory in Chicago painting toy gorillas on an assembly line. In 1951 he returned to where his family resided in Wichita, Kansas. He began working in hotels where many of his artistic ideas accumulated and later became present in his paintings.

Davis was admitted to Wichita State University to study Fine Art 1954 and received his Bachelor of Fine Arts degree with honors in 1959. He received his Master of Fine Arts degree in painting and printmaking in 1963 along with a minor in philosophy.

== Career ==
Davis started a long career in teaching in 1959. He taught at Wichita State University, Wichita Kansas; University of Missouri, Columbia, Missouri; and at the University of Arizona in Tucson where he inspired young artists for 21 years. While teaching in Tucson he and his family were part of the Rancho Linda Vista artist community in Oracle, Arizona.

In 1979 Davis was offered representation by Riva Yares Gallery in Scottsdale, Arizona and Santa Fe, New Mexico. He had several solo exhibitions and he also showed in group exhibitions.

In the '80s, Davis spent part of each year at the studio of acclaimed assemblage and installation artist Edward Kienholz in Berlin, Germany. Edward and Nancy Reddin Kienholz were known for being two of the most influential and important figures to emerge from the Los Angeles art scene in the '50s and '60s. It was through Ed and his studio location that Davis was able to source most of his inspiration. This included the juxtaposition of "the magic and mythology of Mexico and the Southwest with often the violent and urban angst of contemporary "German Expressionism". Throughout the mid to late '80s, Davis' work was shown in art expos in Cologne, Basel, Chicago, and Los Angeles.

For many years, James also maintained studios in the mountains of Colorado and by the sea in Nova Scotia, Canada.

Throughout his career Davis had several books and catalogs published that reflected on certain periods of his artistic career while highlighting his accolades, personal triumphs, and setbacks. These published works included "James G. Davis An Evolving Document: The Animal in Retrospect (1966-1998)", "James G. Davis Twenty Years of Prints", "James G. Davis Paintings and Works on Paper (1988-2004)", and "James G. Davis Twenty-Five Years: A Retrospective in 1988".

Davis retired as Professor Emeritus from the University of Arizona in 1990 to fully devote his time to his paintings and exhibition opportunities.

== Select exhibitions ==
His first solo exhibition was at the University of Oregon in 1961 and from that point on Davis made his mark in several group exhibitions including the Corcoran Biennial-Second Western Federation of the Arts Traveling Show in 1983 and the First Western Federation of the Arts Biennial in 1979. It was featured at the Denver Art Museum, Smithsonian American Art Museum, the San Francisco Museum of Art, and Seattle Art Museum.

In 2004 Davis had one of his acclaimed shows "Paintings and Works on Paper, 1988-2004" at the University of Arizona. It was a 15-year survey exhibition including monumental diptychs and triptychs which featured chronicles of his travels in America, Spain, and Germany. According to Charles A. Guerin, Director at the University of Arizona Museum of Art "Davis was a painter of extraordinary skill who understands the power and potential of the medium. His use of color, contrast, balance, and composition creates drama and dynamic tension within his paintings. His masterful executions of paint on canvas, where realism and abstraction dissolve within transparent and opaque layers of paint, propel his images into and outward from the picture plane. These qualities make Davis' paintings difficult to ignore and rewarding to engage."

Davis had the opportunity to participate in several commission projects for his colleagues also in the arts. He completed signature book covers for poets Michael Van Walleghen, James McKinley, Louis Jenkins, William Pitt Root, and Pamela Uschuk.

Since his death in 2016 Davis has had two shows in the exhibition gallery at Mountain Shadows resort in Paradise Valley, Arizona. The exhibition was curated by John Reyes of Reyes Contemporary Art. Shortly after in September 2017 a collaborative show between James G. Davis, his son Turner G. Davis, and Michael Chittock took place at Etherton Gallery in Tucson, Arizona. This was a retrospective exhibition celebrating Davis' career called "Down at the Tower Bar". It showcased paintings and prints from over four decades.

His works can be found today in a multitude of permanent collections including the Metropolitan Museum of Art in New York City, the Smithsonian American Art Museum and the Hirshhorn Museum of Art, both in Washington, D.C., the Berlinische Museum and the Martin Gropius Bau, Berlin, Germany, the Hess Collection in Napa, California, the North American Mexican Cultural Institute in Guadalajara, Jalisco, Mexico, and in Arizona the Phoenix Art Museum, the Tucson Museum of Art, and the University of Arizona Museum of Art.

== Later life ==
One of Davis' most prominent collections is of his wife. The “Mary Anne Paintings” include five decades of paintings and sketches. Mary Anne served as his muse throughout the years of their marriage. The 19 large oil paintings and 10 small oil sketches have been displayed at the Rancho Linda Vista Gallery in Oracle, Arizona.

On September 6, 2016, Davis died peacefully in his home in Oracle, Arizona at the age of 85. He is survived by his wife Mary Anne Davis, son Turner G. Davis, and three grandchildren.
