= Diane Lockward =

American poet

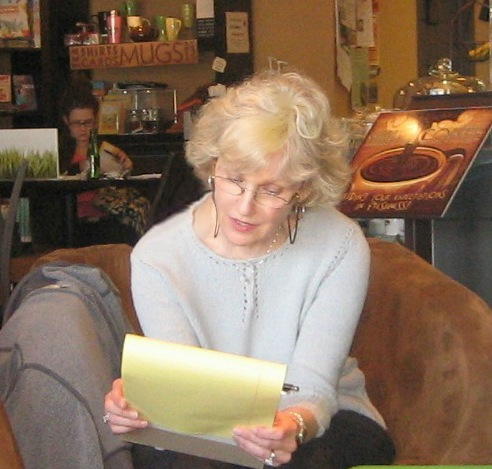
Diane Lockward

Diane Lockward is an American poet. The author of four full-length books of poetry, Lockward serves as the Poet Laureate of West Caldwell, New Jersey.

== Biography ==
Diane Lockward earned her bachelor's degree from Elmira College and her master's from Montclair State University. She is the author of four full-length books of poetry: The Uneaten Carrots of Atonement (2016), Temptation by Water (2010), What Feeds Us (2006), recipient of the Quentin R. Howard Poetry Prize, and Eve's Red Dress (2003), all from Wind Publications. She is also the author/editor of four poetry craft books, The Strategic Poet: Honing the Craft, The Practicing Poet: Writing Beyond the Basics (Terrapin Books, 2018), The Crafty Poet II: A Portable Workshop (Terrapin Books, 2016) and The Crafty Poet: A Portable Workshop (rev. ed., Terrapin Books, 2016), and two chapbooks, Eve Argues Against Perfection (1997) and Greatest Hits: 1997-2010 (2012). Her poems have been published in Prairie Schooner, Spoon River Poetry Review, Poet Lore, Harvard Review, and elsewhere. Her poems have also been featured on Poetry Daily, Verse Daily, Gwarlingo, American Life in Poetry, and The Writer's Almanac. She is the recipient of a Poetry Fellowship from the New Jersey State Council on the Arts and a Woman of Achievement Award. She serves as the Poet Laureate of West Caldwell, New Jersey. She founded the Poetry Festival: A Celebration of Literary Journals in 2004 and served as its director for twelve years. A former high school English teacher at Millburn High School, she has also worked as a poet-in-the-schools for the New Jersey State Council on the Arts and the Geraldine R. Dodge Foundation. She is the founder and publisher of Terrapin Books, a small press for poetry books. She lives in northern New Jersey.

== Works ==
=== Books ===
- Lockward, Diane (2016). The Uneaten Carrots of Atonement. Nicholasville, KY: Wind Publications. ISBN 978-0-9969871-1-0.
- Lockward, Diane (2013). The Crafty Poet: A Portable Workshop. Nicholasville, KY: Wind Publications. ISBN 978-1-9361386-2-3.
- Lockward, Diane (2010). Temptation by Water. Nicholasville, KY: Wind Publications. ISBN 978-1-9361381-2-8.
- Lockward, Diane (2006). What Feeds Us. Nicholasville, KY: Wind Publications. ISBN 978-1-8932395-7-9.
- Lockward, Diane (2003). Eve's Red Dress. Nicholasville, KY: Wind Publications. ISBN 978-1-8932391-8-0.
- Lockward, Diane (2012). Greatest Hits: 1997-2010. Cleveland Heights, OH: Kattywommpus Press. ISBN 978-1936715114.
- Eve Argues Against Perfection (1997)

=== Anthologies ===
- Poetry Daily: 366 Poems from the World's Most Popular Poetry Website
- Good Poems for Hard Times
- In a Fine Frenzy: Poets Respond to Shakespeare
- The Working Poet: 75 Writing Exercises and a Poetry Anthology
- The Poet's Cookbook
- Poem, Home: An Anthology of Ars Poetica
- Eating Her Wedding Dress: A Collection of Clothing Poems
- White Ink: Poems on Mothers and Motherhood
- Sweeping Beauty: Contemporary Women Poets Do Housework
- Family Matters: Poems of Our Families
- The Breath of Parted Lips
- Poetry: A Pocket Anthology
- Mischief, Caprice and Other Poetic Strategies
- Inside Literature: Reading, Responding, Arguing

=== Textbooks ===
- Wingbeats, Vol. 2 (Dos Gatos, 2014)
- The Compact Bedford Introduction to Literature (Bedford/St. Martin's, 2014)
- Literature to Go (Bedford/St. Martin's, 2013)
- Poetry: An Introduction (Bedford/St. Martin's, 2013)
- The Bedford Introduction to Literature: Reading, Thinking, Writing (Bedford/St. Martin's, 2013)
- Inside Literature: Reading, Responding, Arguing (Penguin Academics, 2007)
- Getting the Knack: 20 Poetry Writing Exercises (National Council of Teachers of English, 1992)

== Honors ==
- Poetry Fellowship, 2003, from the New New Jersey State Council on the Arts
- Quentin R. Howard Poetry Prize for What Feeds Us, 2006
- Sunday Poet at Gwarlingo
- First Prize Winner in 2012 Naugatuck River Review Poetry Contest
- Featured Poet at 2007 Burlington Book Festival
- Featured Poet at 2016 and 2006 Geraldine R. Dodge Poetry Festival
- Featured Poet at 2005 Frost Place Conference on Poetry and Teaching
- Featured Poet at 2001 Warren County Poetry Festival
- Featured Poet at Valparaiso Poetry Review
- Featured Poet at Poetry Southeast
- The Missing Wife on Verse Daily
- Birdhouse on Verse Daily
- Seventh-Grade Science Project on Poetry Daily
- My Husband Discovers Poetry on The Writer's Almanac
- Linguini on The Writer's Almanac
- Blueberry on The Writer's Almanac
- The First Artichoke on The Writer's Almanac
- Idiosyncrasies of the Body in 2008 Best of the Net, selected by Dorianne Laux

== See also ==
- List of poets from the United States
