= Gayle Brandeis =

American novelist (born 1968)

- Born: April 14, 1968 (age 58); Chicago, Illinois, U.S.
- Education: University of Redlands (BA); Antioch University (MFA)
- Occupations: Novelist; poet; essayist
- Spouse(s): Matt McGunigle (1990–2008); Michael Brandeis (2009–present)
- Children: Arin; Hannah; Asher
- Writing career
- Period: 1990–present
- Genres: Historical fiction, literary fiction
- Subjects: Social justice, feminism, environmentalism
- Notable work: The Book of Dead Birds
- Website: www.gaylebrandeis.com

Gayle Brandeis (born April 14, 1968, in Chicago, Illinois) is the author of Fruitflesh: Seeds of Inspiration for Women Who Write (HarperOne), Dictionary Poems (Pudding House Publications), the novels The Book of Dead Birds (HarperCollins), which won Barbara Kingsolver's Bellwether Prize for Fiction in Support of a Literature of Social Change, Self Storage (Ballantine) and Delta Girls (Ballantine), and her first novel for young readers, My Life with the Lincolns (Holt). She has two books forthcoming in 2017, a collection of poetry, The Selfless Bliss of the Body, (Finishing Line Press) and a memoir, The Art of Misdiagnosis (Beacon Press)

Gayle's poetry, fiction and essays have appeared in numerous magazines and anthologies (such as Salon.com, The Nation, and The Mississippi Review) and have received several awards, including the QPB/Story Magazine Short Story Award, a Barbara Mandigo Kelly Peace Poetry Award, a grant from the Barbara Deming Memorial Fund, and a Notable Essay in Best American Essays 2016. Her essay on the meaning of liberty was one of three included in the Statue of Liberty's Centennial time capsule in 1986, when she was 18. In 2004, Writer Magazine honored Gayle with a Writer Who Makes a Difference Award.

Gayle holds a BA in "Poetry and Movement: Arts of Expression, Meditation and Healing" from the University of Redlands, and an MFA in Creative Writing/Fiction from Antioch University. Gayle currently teaches in the low residency MFA programs at Antioch University Los Angeles and Sierra Nevada College, where she was named distinguished visiting professor/writer in residence 2014–2015. She served as Inlandia Literary Laureate from 2012 to 2014, acting as literary ambassador to and for the Inland Empire region of Southern California. During her tenure, she worked extensively with the community, including at-risk youth, and edited the anthology ORANGELANDIA: The Literature of Inland Citrus. Gayle is currently editor in chief of Tiferet Journal and founding editor of Lady/Liberty/Lit. She is also mom to kids born in 1990, 1993 and 2009.

== Books ==
Gayle Brandeis' major published works are:

- Dictionary Poems, 2002 Chapbook (ISBN 1-58998-143-X), Pudding House Publications
- Fruitflesh, 2002 Hardcover (ISBN 0-06-251724-4), 2004 Paperback (ISBN 0-06-058718-0), Harper San Francisco
- The Book of Dead Birds, 2003 Hardcover (ISBN 0-06-052803-6), 2004 Paperback (ISBN 0-06-052804-4), Harper Collins
- Self Storage, 2007 Hardcover (ISBN 978-0-345-49260-9), 2008 Paperback (ISBN 978-0-345-49261-6)
- My Life With The Lincolns, 2010 Hardcover (ISBN 0-8050-9013-4) Henry Holt, 2010 Audio CD (ISBN 0-307-71036-X) Listening Library
- Delta Girls, 2010 Paperback (ISBN 0-345-49262-5), Ballantine
- The Selfless Bliss of the Body, 2017 Paperback, Finishing Line Press
- The Art of Misdiagnosis, 2017 Hardcover (ISBN 978-0807044865), Beacon Press
- Many Restless Concerns: The Victims of Countess Bathory Speak in Chorus, 2020 Paperback (ISBN 978-1625570123), Black Lawrence Press
- Drawing Breath: Essays on Writing, the Body, and Loss, 2023 Paperback (ISBN 978-1625570123), Overcup Press

== Publications ==
Gayle Brandeis' work has appeared in the following Publications:

- "Ice Town", Sports Literate
- "Thunder, Thighs”, The Rumpus
- "“The First Meeting of the People of Unintentional Color Support Group", The Butter
- “Cherry Cherry Cherry”, Ghost Town
- “Dendrochronology: The Study of Rings”, The Manifest-Station
- "That’s My House," Saranac Review
- “Ghosts in the Ecotone”, Midnight Breakfast
- "Role/Model”, The Nervous Breakdown
- “Seafoam Salad”, Full Grown People
- "How Dare You?” The Manifest-Station
- “Where I Write: The House My Mother Built”, The Rumpus
- “‘My Sea’: A Personal Journey Through the Literature of the Salton Sea”, The Los Angeles Review of Books
- Brandeis, Gayle (June 12, 2012). ""Mad Men" and Mom's Suicide". Salon. Archived from the original on June 12, 2012.
- "Get Me Away From Here, I’m Dying", The Rumpus
- Brandeis, Gayle (December 16, 1999). "O Tin-nenbaum". Salon. Archived from the original on June 12, 2012.
- "Hash browns". Salon. Archived from the original on June 12, 2012.
- Brandeis, Gayle (June 20, 2000). "Arin and Hannah's cold fusion atomic fireball tea". Salon. Archived from the original on June 12, 2012.
- Brandeis, Gayle (June 20, 2000). "Cold fusion". Salon. Archived from the original on June 12, 2012.
- Support Our Troops, The Nation
- MR 32/3 Politics & Religion, Mississippi Review
- Rapture , The Vestal Review
- Purple Couches, The Dogtown Review
- Purple Bananas, Nerve
- https://web.archive.org/web/20100530125830/http://www.mcsweeneys.net/2004/8/17contributors.html, McSweeney's Internet Tendency
- Beach House Bingo, California Authors
- Shoot, California Authors
- comfit , Clean Sheets
- Avocado, Clean Sheets
- Flotsam, Drunken Boat
- Baby Calls, In Posse
- Pillow Shams, Pindeldyboz
- Two, Brain Child
- Smoke Inhalation , Hip Mama
- A Long Time, Literary Mama
- The Real Minerva, Literary Mama
- Eyes in the Back of Her Head, Literary Mama
- Isinglass, Tattoo Highway
- The Gum Tree, Tattoo Highway
- Static Electricity, Tattoo Highway
- Edges, Green Tricycle
- Mouthing, Desires

== Anthologies ==
Gayle Brandeis' work has appeared in the following Anthologies:

- Soulmate 101 and Other Essays on Love and Sex, Full Grown People
- No Plot? No Problem!, Chronicle Books
- Garden Blessings: Prose, Poems and Prayers Celebrating the Love of Gardening, Cleis Press
- Gratitude Prayers: Prayers, Poems, and Prose for Everyday Thankfulness, Andrews McMeel Publishing
- Sudden Flash Youth: 65 Short-Short Stories, Persea Press
- The Maternal Is Political, ISBN 978-1-58005-243-6, Women Writers at the Intersection of Motherhood and Social Change (Seal Press)
- You Have Time For This: Contemporary American Short-Short Stories, ISBN 978-1-932010-17-6, Ooligan Press
- The Other Woman, ISBN 0-446-58022-8, Warner Books
- American Wars: Illusions And Realities, ISBN 978-0-932863-56-0, Clarity Press
- The Future Dictionary Of America, McSweeney's
- The Imperfect Mom: Candid Confessions of Mothers Living in the Real World, ISBN 978-0-7679-2266-1, Broadway Books
- Roar Softly And Carry A Great Lipstick: 28 Women Writers On Life, Sex And Survival, ISBN 1-930722-38-9, Inner Ocean
- It's A Boy: Women Writers On Raising Sons, ISBN 1-58005-145-6, Seal Press
- It's A Girl: Women Writers On Raising Daughters, ISBN 1-58005-147-2, Seal Press
- Literary Mama: Reading For The Maternally Inclined, ISBN 1-58005-158-8, Seal Press
- The Knitter's Gift: An Inspirational Bag of Words, Wisdom, and Craft, ISBN 1-59337-100-4, Adams Media
- Mischief, Caprice, & Other Poetic Strategies, ISBN 1-888996-17-X, Red Hen Press
- Fresh Milk: The Secret Life Of Breasts, ISBN 0-7432-1147-2, Simon & Schuster
- Fresh Water: Poems From The Rivers, Lakes And Streams, ISBN 1-58998-082-4, Pudding House Publications
- Proposing On The Brooklyn Bridge: Poems About Marriage, ISBN 0-9675554-6-9, Grayson Books
- Henry’s Creature: Poems And Stories On The Automobile, ISBN 0-88753-348-5, Black Moss Press
- 2000: Here’s To Humanity, ISBN 0-9658432-4-6, The People's Press
- The Spirit Of Pregnancy: An Interactive Anthology for Your Journey to Motherhood, ISBN 0-8092-2615-4, Contemporary Books
- Breeder: Real-Life Stories from the New Generation of Mothers, ISBN 1-58005-051-4, Seal Press
- Jane's Stories II: An Anthology By Midwestern Women, ISBN 0-9639894-3-X, Wild Dove Press
- Essential Love: Poems About Mothers And Fathers, Daughters And Sons, ISBN 0-9675554-1-8, Poetworks
- Jewish Mothers Tell Their Stories: Acts Of Love And Courage, ISBN 0-7890-1099-2, The Haworth Press
- The Oy Of Sex: Jewish Women Write Erotica, ISBN 1-57344-083-3, Cleis Press
- Family Celebrations: Prayers, Poems, and Toasts For Every Occasion, ISBN 0-8362-7856-9, (Andrews McMeel)
- Those Who Can... Teach!: Celebrating Teachers Who Make a Difference, ISBN 1-885171-35-8, Wildcat Canyon Press
- Heal Your Soul, Heal the World: Prayers and Poems to Comfort, Inspire, and Connect Humanity, ISBN 0-8362-6915-2, Andrews McMeel
- Eating Our Hearts Out: Personal Accounts of Women's Relationship to Food, ISBN 0-89594-569-X, The Crossing Press
- Vegetarian Pregnancy: The Definitive Nutritional Guide to Having a Healthy Baby, ISBN 0-935526-21-8, McBooks Press
- Our Mothers, Ourselves: Writers and Poets Celebrating Motherhood, ISBN 0-89789-445-6, Bergin & Garvey
- The Breast: An Anthology, ISBN 0-9641292-8-0, Global City Press
- Pandemonium: Or, Life with Kids, ISBN 1-887166-19-X, Hysteria Publications
- Which Lilith?: Feminist Writers Re-Create The World’s First Woman, ISBN 0-7657-6015-0, Jacob Aronson

== Honors ==
- Notable Essay, The Best American Essays 2016
- "Climbing at Joshua Tree" poem selected by United States Department of the Interior to be installed in the Joshua Tree National Park Visitor Center, 2016
- Pushcart Prize Nomination, Full Grown People, 2014
- Inlandia Literary Laureate, 2012-2014
- Writer in Residence, Riverside Art Museum, 2012-2014
- Silver Nautilus Book Award, My Life with the Lincolns, 2012
- Read On Wisconsin selection, My Life with the Lincolns, January, 2011
- Women of Distinction , Girl Scouts of San Gorgonio Council, 2008
- Breakout Book, Target's Bookmarked Program (February, 2008, paperback release of Self Storage)
- Special Mention, Pushcart Prize, 2007
- Arts Honoree, City of Riverside, 2007
- Nomination, Pushcart Prize, Amazon Shorts, 2006
- Notable Story of 2005, Million Writers Short Story Award, 2006
- Honorable Mention, Thomas Merton Poetry of the Sacred Competition, 2006
- Keynote Speaker, Conference on Gender and Culture, Oregon State U., 2006
- Writer Who Makes a Difference Award, The Writer Magazine, 2004
- Pushcart Prize Nomination, The Vestal Review, 2004
- Keynote Speaker, National Association for Women Writers Conference, 2004
- Notable Book, Kirayama Pacific Rim Book Prize, The Book of Dead Birds, 2004
- BookSense selection, American Booksellers Association, The Book of Dead Birds, 2003
- Bellwether Prize for Fiction in Support of a Literature of Social Change, The Book of Dead Birds, 2002
- BookSense selection, American Booksellers Association, Fruitflesh, 2002
- Second Place, 24-Hour Short Story Contest, Writers Weekly, 2002
- Graduation Speaker, Antioch University, 2001.
- First Place, Inscriptions Force of Nature Poetry Contest, 2001.
- Money for Women/Barbara Deming Memorial Fund grant, 1999.
- Winner, Art on the Air/Inventing the Invisible "Vision" Poetry Award, 1999.
- Winner, 1998 Quality Paperback Book Club/Story Magazine Short Story Award.
- Finalist, Icarus Poetry Competition, 1998.
- Finalist, Flash Fiction Competition, 1998.
- Finalist, Shenango Rivers Press Prose Chapbook Competition, 1998.
- Editor's Choice Award in Fiction, Scarlet Apple Enterprises, 1997.
- Second Place, The Empty Shelf Fiction Contest, 1997.
- Barbara Mandigo Kelly Peace Poetry Award, sponsored by Nuclear Age Peace Foundation, 1996.
- Grand Prize, "Mini Plays" play writing contest sponsored by Lake Arrowhead Performing Arts Company, 1995.
- First Place, "Poetry in Motion" contest sponsored by Chaparral Poets, 1993.
- PEN American Center Grant, 1993.
- Phi Beta Kappa, 1990.
