= Heidi W. Durrow =

American writer

Heidi Wedel Durrow
- Born: June 21, 1969 (age 57)
- Education: Stanford University; Columbia University Graduate School of Journalism (MS); Yale Law School (JD)

Heidi W. Durrow (born June 21, 1969) is an American writer, author of best-seller The Girl Who Fell from the Sky, and the winner of the 2008 PEN/Bellwether Prize for Socially Engaged Fiction.

== Life and education ==
Durrow, the daughter of a Danish immigrant and an African-American Air Force man, grew up in part overseas in Turkey, Germany, and Denmark. In 1980 her family settled in Portland, Oregon, where she attended Jefferson High School. She majored in English at Stanford University and wrote a weekly column for the Stanford Daily, graduating in 1991 with Honors. She continued her education at Columbia University Graduate School of Journalism and received a M.S. in 1992. She then attended Yale Law School and received her J.D. in 1995.

== Career ==
Durrow's career began at Cravath, Swaine & Moore in New York City, where she worked as a corporate litigator on antitrust, commercial contracts, and employment discrimination cases. She left Cravath in 1997 to pursue a literary career.

Durrow worked as a consultant to the National Basketball Association and National Football League as a Life Skills trainer from 2000 to 2006.

Durrow was a host of the award-winning weekly podcast Mixed Chicks Chat focused on issues of being racially and culturally mixed.

In 2008 Durrow became a founder of the now defunct Mixed Roots Film & Literary Festival. The Festival—which ran from 2008 to 2012—celebrated stories of the Mixed experience including stories about biracial identity, transracially adopted families, and interracial and intercultural relationships and friendships. The Festival presented films, readings, workshops, a family event, and the largest West Coast "((Loving Day celebration))".

Durrow created a new festival called the Mixed Remixed Festival which premiered June 14, 2014.

Durrow was named a Power 100 Leader by Ebony Magazine in 2010 and was nominated for a 2011 NAACP Image Award for Outstanding Literary Debut.

=== The Girl Who Fell from the Sky ===
The Girl Who Fell from the Sky was published February 16, 2010 by Algonquin Books.

The book won the PEN/Bellwether Prize for Socially Engaged Fiction (2008) and was nominated for the Goodreads Choice Award for Debut Author (2010) and Carnegie Medal (2011).

In 2022, The Girl Who Fell from the Sky was listed among 52 books banned by the Alpine School District following the implementation of Utah law H.B. 374, "Sensitive Materials In Schools." Forty-two percent of removed books "feature LBGTQ+ characters and or themes."

== Awards and honors ==
Durrow has received multiple fellowships and grants for her writing, including the following:

- Jerome Foundation Award for Emerging Writers (2004)
- Fellowship in Fiction from the New York Foundation for the Arts (2004)
- Creative Artist Fellowship from the American Antiquarian Society (2007)
- Elizabeth George Foundation Grant for Writers (2007)
- Creative Artist Fellowship from the American Scandinavian Foundation (2007)
- Roth Endowment Award (2007)

Awards for Durrow's writing
Year	Title	Award	Category	Result	Ref.
2004	—	Chapter One Fiction Contest	—	Winner	
2004	—	Lorian Hemingway Short Story Competition	—	Winner	
2008	The Girl Who Fell from the Sky	PEN/Bellwether Prize for Socially Engaged Fiction	—	Winner	
2010	The Girl Who Fell from the Sky	Goodreads Choice Award	Debut Author	Nominee	
2011	The Girl Who Fell from the Sky	Carnegie Medal	—	Nominee	
