= Marjorie Kowalski Cole =

American poet

- Born: July 20, 1953; Boston, Massachusetts, U.S.
- Died: December 4, 2009 (aged 56); Alaska, U.S.
- Education: University of Alaska Fairbanks (BA, MA); University of Washington (MLS)
- Occupation: Writer
- Spouses: Terrence Cole (m. 1977–1997) John Patrick Lambert (m. 2000)
- Children: 2
- Writing career
- Notable awards: Bellwether Prize (2004)

Marjorie Kowalski Cole (July 20, 1953 – December 4, 2009) was an American writer of poetry, short stories and novels. She won the 2004 Bellwether Prize (for previously unpublished works of fiction which address issues of social justice) with her first novel Correcting the Landscape.

== History ==
Born in Boston, Cole lived in Alaska from 1966 until her death. She earned a BA and an MA in English from the University of Alaska Fairbanks, and an MLS in Library Science from the University of Washington. She worked as a librarian and for a time as an instructor at the University of Alaska Fairbanks, retiring in 1999 to focus on writing.

Cole had a strong sense of nature - enjoying hiking, kayaking, backpacking and skiing - and a love of travel. She had strong religious faith, and was undertaking a ministry education program when she died. She worked with the Literacy Council of Alaska, the Northern Alaska Environmental Center, the Alaska Peace Center and the Fairbanks Arts Association, among others. She loved music and was an enthusiastic banjo player.

== Career ==
Correcting the Landscape deals with the travails of the editor of an alternative weekly paper in Fairbanks, Alaska, his growing friendship with one of his staff, and his struggle against an environmentally damaging development. Alan Cheuse commented on this novel on the NPR program All Things Considered.

Cole's poetry collection, Inside, Outside, Morningside, was published posthumously in 2010. A poem from that collection, Pushkin, about her eponymous cat, was read by Garrison Keillor on his NPR program The Writer's Almanac.

Cole's second novel, A Spell on the Water, appeared in 2011. The novel deals with a widowed mother, four daughters and a son in Northern Michigan between the mid 1950s and early 1970s. They cope---or sometimes fail to cope---with the environment, their rural community, and each other. The children come of age and the family makes ends meet partly by running a somewhat shabby lakeside resort during the summers.

A collection of stories, The City Beneath the Snow, has been published.

== Personal life ==
She was married to Terrence Cole from December 1977 to 1997, and had two sons, Henry and Desmond Cole. She married John Patrick Lambert in July 2000.
