= Donna Gershten =

American novelist

Donna Gershten is the author of Kissing the Virgin's Mouth (2000) the winner of the inaugural Bellwether Prize for fiction.

She was born in North Carolina and lived in Mexico while working as a fitness instructor. She received a master's degree in fine arts in creative writing from Warren Wilson College, and now resides in Huerfano Valley and Denver.

Kissing the Virgin's Mouth is the story of a woman who uses the tools available to her to escape from poverty and an extremely rigid traditional life in Mexico. When she returns to Mexico from the United States, she realises that despite her tough life she has grown and opened in ways that would not have been possible had she stayed. It touches on the themes of womanhood, abuse and immigration.

== Reviews ==
- Jules Siegal, "Daily battles of Mexican Women: two novels explore the country’s feminine side", San Francisco Chronicle, Sunday 11 March 2001.
