= Jim Limber =

American slave, lived with Jefferson Davis's family

- Other names: Jim Limber Davis; James Henry Brooks
- Known for: Being a biracial orphan who lived with Jefferson Davis and his family during the American Civil War

Jim Limber (also known as Jim Limber Davis, possibly born James Henry Brooks) was an American orphaned boy of mixed white and black descent who lived with the family of Confederate president Jefferson Davis from February 1864 until the family was captured by Union forces in May 1865.

On February 14, 1864, Davis's wife, Varina Davis, was returning home in Richmond, Virginia, when she saw the boy being beaten by a black woman. Outraged, she immediately put an end to the beating and had the boy come with her in her carriage. He was cared for by Mrs. Davis and her staff. They gave him clothes belonging to the Davis's son, Joe, since the boys were of similar age. When asked his name, he just said, "Jim Limber."

Although Limber's legal status was unknown at the time the Davis family took him in, he was likely the orphaned child of free parents, and Davis officially registered the child as "free." It is unknown if Davis actually adopted him. There was no adoption law in Virginia at that time, so any adoption would be an "extralegal" matter. Varina Davis described Limber as a "great pet in the family."

Limber was with the Davises when they were forced to abandon Richmond before the Union Army captured the city in April 1865. When the Davises were captured by Union forces in Irwinville, Georgia, on May 15, Limber was separated from them. Some recounts of the story say this was due to a swift kidnapping of him by the Union Army, while other accounts say that the Davises recognized a Union general they knew well, Rufus Saxton. The Davis family never saw Limber again.

Limber briefly lived with Saxton in Charleston, South Carolina, but was eventually sent north for education until he was old enough to support himself. Though it is mentioned in some of the more sympathetic biographies of Jefferson Davis that he never stopped searching for Limber, this search seems to be recorded only in oral history as it is not mentioned in his voluminous surviving correspondence for the last two decades of his life in which mention at all of Limber is fleeting.

In 2008, the Sons of Confederate Veterans commissioned a life-sized statue from sculptor Gary Casteel that depicts Davis holding hands with his son, Joseph Evan Davis, and Jim Limber. The statue was completed in fall 2008 at a cost of $100,000. The American Civil War Center in Richmond initially accepted it without guaranteeing to exhibit it. The deal quickly fell through. It is now on permanent display at the Beauvoir estate, Davis's last home in Biloxi, Mississippi.

The story of Limber's time with the Davis family is told in Charles Frazier's novel Varina and plays a dominant role in the second section of Shane McCrae's 2019 book of poetry, In the Language of My Captor.
