= Moonrise Over New Jessup =

2023 novel by Jamila Minnicks

- Author: Jamila Minnicks
- Publisher: Algonquin Books
- Publication date: 2023
- ISBN: 978-1-643-75246-4

Moonrise Over New Jessup is Jamila Minnicks’ debut novel. It was published in 2023 by Algonquin Books. The novel won the 2021 PEN/Bellwether Prize for Socially Engaged Fiction, and The Black Caucus of the American Library Association First Novelist Award. It was also shortlisted for the Center for Fiction First Novel Prize, and longlisted for the Crook's Corner Book Prize.

== Plot ==
In 1957, Alice Young moves to New Jessup, the Black side of the town of Jessup in Alabama whose residents have decided to turn away from integration as a solution to racial disparity. Alice falls in love and marries Raymond Campbell, who is part of a group called the National Negro Advancement Society (NNAS), a group that wants to resist integration, achieve a state of separate but actually equal, and make New Jessup its own separate municipality with voting rights to keep the Black people who live there safe from the White families that live across town.

As many residents of New Jessup, including Alice, simply want to live peacefully among Black people without getting involved in what they consider to be dangerous organizing, Raymond's work threatens the stability of the town and threatens to get their family thrown out. Alice is happy to simply live in an all-Black town, but since she loves Raymond, she tries to keep his organizing a secret, at all costs, even though her secret keeping is part of why another organizer is thrown out of town.

Raymond, Alice, and the other members of NNAS also face pressure to ditch their agenda from organizers aligned with the bigger Civil Rights Movement who are pushing for integration and Black equality, since they feel that separate will never be equal, no matter how much independence Black people can claim from Whites. They also face pressure from Simeon, a lawyer from Georgia and the National NNAS, who wants to recruit more organizers from town, instead of keeping the organizing a secret, and also to hurry up and push for voting rights instead of waiting to form a separate town first. They also face pressure from the Fitzhughs, a White family from the other side of town, to keep servicing their cars after Raymond's family towed one of their cars as a favor. And they also realize court ordered desegregation may soon come, whether they want it or not.

After Chase Fitzhugh asks for a tow on Raymond and Alice's daughter's birthday, and Raymond offers to look over all the Fitzhughs’ cars, the Campbells have to turn back an angry group of Fitzhugh men who've come to invade their land, since they don't appreciate what they felt was Raymond telling them how to run their business. Simeon, the Georgia lawyer, exposes Raymond's organizing activities, and Alice and Raymond prepare to leave town and move to Washington DC. But after Raymond's organizing receives more support from the community than they expect, they decide to stay in town after all.
