= Lisa Ko =

American writer

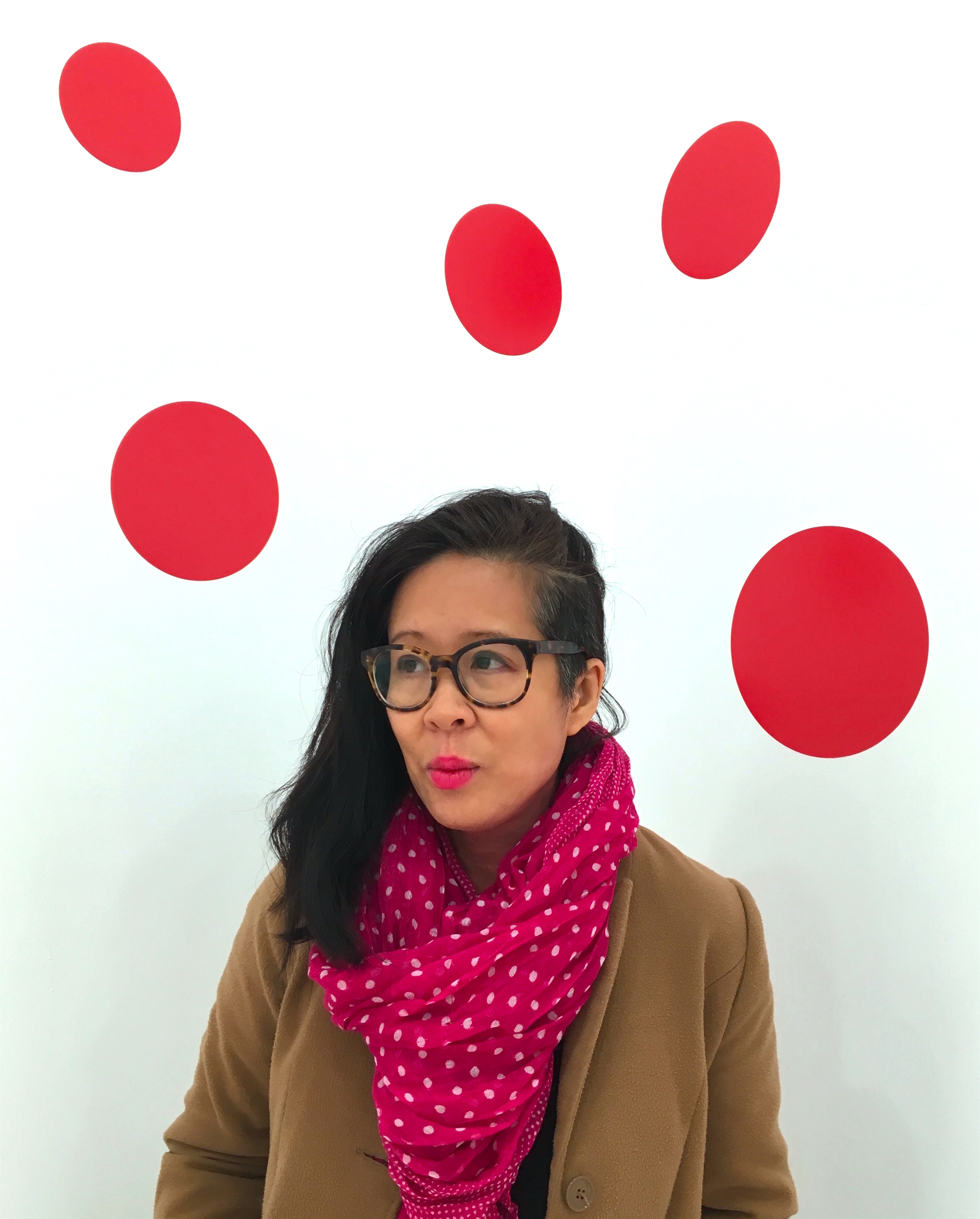
- Born: New York City, New York, U.S.
- Education: Wesleyan University; San Jose State University; City College of New York
- Occupations: Writer, editor
- Notable work: The Leavers; Memory Piece
- Awards: Bellwether Prize
- Website: lisa-ko.com

Lisa Ko is an American writer. Her debut novel, The Leavers, was a national bestseller, won the 2016 PEN/Bellwether Prize for Socially Engaged Fiction, and was a finalist for the 2017 National Book Award for Fiction. Her short fiction has been published in Best American Short Stories and McSweeney's and her essays in The New York Times and The Believer. Ko's second novel, Memory Piece, was published in 2024.

== Early life and education ==
Born in New York City, Ko grew up in suburban New Jersey, the only child of Chinese immigrants from the Philippines. She began writing stories and keeping a journal at the age of five, though she only shared the work with others in high school. As a child, Ko and her parents ran a stand at craft shows and flea markets, an experience which later inspired her novel writing process. She attended Wesleyan University, majoring in English.

Ko moved back to New York City in the late 1990s, where she worked in print magazines and had an online diary called Incommunicado.net. She took writing classes after work, including one at the Asian American Writers’ Workshop taught by Jhumpa Lahiri where her classmates included Cathy Park Hong, Ed Lin, and Min Jin Lee. She lived in San Francisco in the early 2000s, where she was one of the founders of Hyphen magazine, serving as books editor.

Ko earned a Master of Library and Information Science degree from San Jose State University in 2005 while working at a film production company. She then received a Master of Fine Arts from the City College of New York in 2012, taking classes at night while working three day jobs.

== Career ==
Ko's writing has been described as "exquisite," "draw[ing] characters with such deftness that they feel wholly alive." Her nonfiction has been called "revealing and wickedly perceptive." Her writing often features music.

In an interview in Electric Literature, Ko says that her novels "look at the relationship of Asian Americans to the US imperial project. They both also touch on the gap and tension between the stories we are told and stories we tell ourselves, and the importance—and complications—of community."

Ko is the recipient of fellowships from Hedgebrook, MacDowell, the Black Mountain Institute, Ucross, Blue Mountain Center, the New York Foundation for the Arts, and the Lower Manhattan Cultural Council, among others. She has been a guest speaker at schools, book festivals, and universities and has taught creative writing at Indiana University, The New School, the City College of New York, the One Story Summer Writers Conference, and in community settings. In 2019, she taught in the DREAMing Out Loud program at Queens College. Her work has been taught in college classes throughout the United States.

=== The Leavers ===
Ko published her first novel, The Leavers, with Algonquin Books of Chapel Hill in 2017 after winning the 2016 PEN/Bellwether Prize for Socially Engaged Fiction. Ko submitted her novel for the prize after working on it for seven years, as part of her goal to receive 50 literary-related rejections in one year. The book follows Polly, an undocumented immigrant from China to the United States, and her son Deming, who is adopted by a white couple when Polly goes missing.

The Leavers was inspired by a 2009 New York Times story about an undocumented immigrant woman who was detained, largely in solitary confinement, for more than a year and a half. Reviewing the book in The New York Times, Gish Jen said Ko's book "has taken the headlines and reminded us that beyond them lie messy, brave, extraordinary, ordinary lives."

The Leavers was a 2017 finalist for the National Book Award for Fiction. The judges’ citation called it "a bold reinvention of the Asian immigrant novel as great American novel." It was a finalist for the PEN/Hemingway Award and won the Asian Pacific American Award for Adult Fiction.

The novel was a national best seller and named one of the best books of the year by NPR, Entertainment Weekly, BuzzFeed, the Los Angeles Times, Electric Literature, and The Irish Times.

=== Memory Piece ===
In 2024, Ko published her second novel, Memory Piece, with Riverhead Books. The book was inspired by early internet culture, performance art, malls, and surveillance capitalism. Described as "queer not only in content but in form" and "a book about the triumph of community, friendship, and love," the novel follows three friends, a performance artist, a tech coder, and a housing activist, from the 1980s to the 2040s, using New York City as a microcosm of the larger political economy of the US.

Lily Meyer wrote for The Atlantic that "Memory Piece asks what hopes are worth clinging to, what parts of society are worth participating in, what powers are worth putting in the energy to fight. It belongs to an American literary tradition that includes Dana Spiotta, George Saunders, and their patron saint, Don DeLillo: writers whose characters sense that their lives happen at the whim of forces too enormous to understand or evade, but set out to dodge them anyway."

At The Guardian, Holly Williams noted that "Ko writes with a cool, collected intelligence and is unafraid to wrangle big ideas."

Barack Obama named Memory Piece as one of the selections on his Summer 2024 Reading List. Emma Roberts selected the book as the April 2024 read for the Belletrist Book Club. It was named a Best Book of the Year by Time, NPR, and Vogue and was longlisted for the New American Voices Award.

=== Albany Book Festival ===
Along with writer Aisha Gawad, Ko shared concerns about a panel scheduled for September 2024 at the Albany Book Festival, sponsored by the New York State Writers Institute. News outlets published emails sent to Elisa Albert by the Writers Institute's assistant director Mark Koplik, who claimed Gawad and Ko didn’t "want to be on a panel with a ‘Zionist.’” PEN America issued a statement that said: “It is deeply distressing that any writer would be denied the opportunity to speak and engage in conversation about their craft because of their identity.” However, Ko said she neither refused to be on the panel nor used the word 'Zionist’, and that she only privately expressed her support for Gawad, who chose to withdraw from the panel due to a series of social media and published articles written by Albert, the panel’s moderator, on the Gaza war. Ko told the Times Union: “I never refused to participate on the panel, and the accusation that I withdrew because the moderator is Jewish, or that I am unwilling to appear onstage with someone who is Jewish, is hurtful and completely false [...] misinformation that has gone on to foster an increasingly hostile response toward myself and others, including defamation and death threats.”

An open letter organized by Viet Thanh Nguyen called on the New York State Writers Institute to issue a "full correction" for “the misinformation they circulated” regarding Ko and Gawad. On December 6, 2024, PEN added a lead-in to its updated statement: "An earlier version of this press release responded to reporting that has since been disputed by both Lisa Ko and Aisha Abdel Gawad. They have stated that their comments and the reason for the cancellation of the event in question have been misrepresented. The Writers Institute has also since apologized to all the panel participants for 'not treating this programming with the careful consideration it needed and for any consequences they faced as a result.' The press release below has been revised accordingly. We regret that the initial statement did not reflect these writers’ accounts. We also condemn the threats and harassment Ko and Gawad have faced in the wake of this incident, as well as loss of livelihood, one instance of which PEN America spoke out against in September."

== Awards and honors ==
Year	Title	Award	Category	Result	Ref.
2016	The Leavers	PEN/Bellwether Prize for Socially Engaged Fiction	—	Won	
2017	The Leavers	Asian/Pacific American Award for Literature	Adult Fiction	Won	
2017	The Leavers	Barnes & Noble Discover Great New Writers Award	Fiction	Shortlisted	
2017	The Leavers	National Book Award	Fiction	Shortlisted	
2018	The Leavers	Aspen Words Literary Prize	—	Longlisted	
2018	The Leavers	New York City Book Awards	Hornblower Award for First Book	Won	
2018	The Leavers	PEN/Hemingway Award for Debut Novel	—	Shortlisted	
2019	The Leavers	International Dublin Literary Award	—	Longlisted	
2024	Memory Piece	Joyce Carol Oates Literary Prize	—	Longlisted	
2024	Memory Piece	New American Voices Award	—	Longlisted	

== Selected works ==
=== Books ===
- The Leavers. Algonquin Books. 2017. ISBN 9781616206888.
- Memory Piece. Riverhead Books. 2024. ISBN 9780593542101.

=== Short stories ===
- "Celestial City" in McSweeney's
- "Nightlife" in Small Odysseys: Selected Shorts
- "The Contractors" in Amazon Original Stories
- "Pat + Sam" in Copper Nickel and The Best American Short Stories 2016
- "Proper Girls" in One Story

=== Essays ===
- "How Writing a Novel is Like Wandering a Flea Market" in Literary Hub
- "Dream Futures" in The Rumpus
- "Distancing #6: Rock ’n Soul Part 1" in The Believer
- "Literary Institutions Are Pressuring Authors to Remain Silent About Gaza" in TruthOut
- "Seeking the Comfort of an Old Flame: Solitude" in The New York Times
- "What 'White' Food Meant to a First-Generation Kid" in The New York Times
- "Harvard and the Myth of the Interchangeable Asian" in The New York Times
- "An American Woman Quits Smiling" in The New York Times
- "Why It Matters That ‘Emily Doe’ in the Brock Turner Case Is Asian-American" in The New York Times
- "Not Finishing My Novel Would Have Ruined My Life" in Literary Hub
- "20 Lessons on How to Be American" in The Offing

=== Book reviews ===
- "An audacious memoir from Viet Thanh Nguyen, author of 'The Sympathizer'" in The Washington Post
- "After a Camping Trip, Five Girls' Lives Are No Longer the Same" in The New York Times Book Review
- "War Fractures" in Los Angeles Review of Books
