= James Davis (Kent cricketer) =

English cricketer

Personal information
- Full name: James Painter Davis
- Born: 11 February 1790; Bethnal Green, Middlesex, England
- Died: 9 October 1870 (aged 79); Peckham, Surrey, England

Domestic team information
- Years: Team
- 1828: Kent

Career statistics
Competition	First-class
Matches	4
Runs scored	46
Batting average	5.75
100s/50s	0/0
Top score	13
Catches/stumpings	4/–
- Source: Cricinfo, 9 November 2013

James Painter Davis (11 February 1790 – 9 October 1870) was an English cricketer active in the 1820s and 1830s, making four appearances in first-class cricket. Christened at Bethnal Green, Middlesex on 7 March 1790, Davis was a batsman of unknown style who played first-class cricket for three teams.

== Career ==
Davis made his first-class debut for Kent against the Marylebone Cricket Club (MCC) in 1828 at Lord's. Four years later he made two first-class appearances for the Gentlemen of Kent against the MCC and the Gentlemen of England, before making a final first-class appearance for an early England team against Sussex in 1834. In his four appearances in first-class cricket, Davis scored 46 runs at an average of 5.75, with a high score of 13.

He died at Peckham, Surrey on 9 October 1870, aged 80.

== Bibliography ==
- Carlaw, Derek (2020). Kent County Cricketers, A to Z: Part One (1806–1914) (PDF). Cardiff: ACS.
