= Naomi Benaron =

American author

- Born: Boston, Massachusetts, U.S.
- Education: Scripps Institution of Oceanography (MS); Antioch University (MFA)
- Occupation: Author
- Writing career
- Genre: Fiction
- Notable awards: Bellwether Prize (2010)

Naomi Benaron is an American author. With her novel Running the Rift she won the 2010 Bellwether Prize for fiction. This is awarded to a first novel which contributed to a literature of social engagement. Her collection of short stories Love Letter from a Fat Man, won the 2006 G. S. Sharat Chandra Prize for Fiction. Both the novel and the short story collection dealt with the Rwandan genocide. Ms Benaron has also published poetry and short stories in many journals and anthologies.

Born and raised in Boston, she lives in Tucson, and has worked at a variety of jobs while writing. She has a Master of Fine Arts degree from Antioch University in Los Angeles, and a Master of Science degree in Earth Sciences from Scripps Institute of Oceanography.
