= The Leavers =

2017 debut novel by Lisa Ko

- First edition cover
- Author: Lisa Ko
- Audio read by: Emily Woo Zeller
- Genre: Bildungsroman
- Publisher: Algonquin Books
- Publication date: May 2, 2017
- Publication place: United States
- Media type: Print (hardcover); Print (paperback); Digital (ebook); Digital (audiobook)
- Pages: 338 pp. (hardcover 1st ed)
- Awards: PEN/Bellwether Prize for Socially Engaged Fiction; Asian/Pacific American Awards for Literature, Adult Fiction
- ISBN: 9781616206888
- OCLC: 953599445
- LC Class: PS3611.O135 L43 2017
- Website: http://lisa-ko.com/theleavers

The Leavers is Lisa Ko's first novel published on May 2, 2017, by Algonquin Books.

== Background ==
Ko's novel was inspired by a 2009 article in The New York Times describing an undocumented immigrant from Fuzhou, China, who was arrested at a Greyhound station in Florida on her way to a new job and spent a year and a half in detention.

== Plot ==
Told in four parts, the novel begins as Deming Guo's mother Polly suddenly disappears from the family's New York City apartment without warning. Deming is placed into foster care, ultimately to be adopted by a suburban couple, Kay and Peter. Five hours away from the city in Ridgeburough, Deming Guo becomes Daniel Wilkinson. Deming/Daniel searches for a sense of connection, belonging, and identity in a new home with a new family.

Part II introduces Polly's story.

== Reception ==
Writing for The New York Times, Gish Jen praised the novel for taking the headline-news of immigration and "remind[ing] us that beyond [that] lie messy, brave, extraordinary, ordinary lives." At the same time, Jen felt the prose was overly expository and that some conservative plot points mark "this book as one that takes risks but then hedges its bets."

Reviewing the novel for The Guardian, Arifa Akbar felt: "The Leavers ... themes of displacement and deportation carry deep and desperately urgent resonances far beyond America, and fiction. Ko movingly captures Polly and Deming's liminal presence in the immigrant community, on the margins of society in overcrowded apartments, in nail parlours and factories, who are always there yet invisible to the rest of us."

== Awards ==
The Leavers received the PEN/Bellwether Prize for Socially Engaged Fiction and a nomination for National Book Award for Fiction.

Year	Award	Category	Result	Ref.
2016	PEN/Bellwether Prize for Socially Engaged Fiction	—	Won	
2017	Asian/Pacific American Award for Literature	Adult Fiction	Won	
2017	Barnes & Noble Discover Great New Writers Award	Fiction	Shortlisted	
2017	National Book Award	Fiction	Shortlisted	
2018	Aspen Words Literary Prize	—	Longlisted	
2018	New York City Book Awards Hornblower Award for First Book	—	Won	
2018	PEN/Hemingway Award for Debut Novel	—	Shortlisted	
2019	International Dublin Literary Award	—	Longlisted	
