= James Davis (actor) =

American theatre actor

- Born: St. Louis, Missouri
- Occupation: Actor
- Years active: 2007–present

James Patrick Davis is an American actor known for his role as Will Parker in the Broadway musical Oklahoma!, where he won a Theatre World Award for his performance of Will Parker; he is also heard on its 2019 broadway cast recording. He made his Broadway debut in John Guare's The House of Blue Leaves.

== Early life ==
Davis grew up in St. Louis, Missouri and graduated from The Juilliard School in New York City. He began his career at the Shakespeare Theater in Washington, D.C. playing Juliet in Romeo and Juliet opposite Finn Wittrock.

== Career ==
Some of his early off-Broadway productions include an unnamed lead role in What Happened When by Daniel Talbott at Rising Phoenix Repertory in 2007, an unnamed role in We Are Proud to Present a Presentation About the Herero of Namibia, Formerly Known as Southwest Africa, From the German Sudwestafrika, Between the Years 1884–1915 at Soho Repertory Theatre in 2012, and also in The Mother of Invention by James Lecesne at Abingdon Theatre Company.

He made his Broadway debut in The House of Blue Leaves as a military policeman and an understudy to the lead role, Artie Shaughnessy, alongside Ben Stiller and Edie Falco in 2011.

In both the 2015 Bard SummerScape version of Oklahoma! as well as its 2019 Broadway revival he played Will Parker, where he earned a Theatre World Award for his performance.

== Acting credits ==
Year	Title	Role	Location	Notes	Ref.
2008	Romeo and Juliet	Juliet	Shakespeare Theatre Company	Regional Theater	
2010	American Buffalo	Bobby	Studio Theater	Regional Theater	
2011	House of Blue Leaves	Policeman	Walter Kerr	Broadway	
2012	We are Proud to Present	Man	Soho Rep	Off-Broadway	
2013	Clybourne Park	Jim/Tom/Kenneth	Long Wharf Theatre	Regional Theater	
2014	As You Like It	Jacques	Quintessence Theater	Regional Theater	
2014	Richard II	King Richard II	Quintessence Theatre	Regional Theater	
2017	The Mother of Invention	Jimmy	Abingdon Theatre	Off-Broadway	
2017	Long Day's Journey Into Night	Edmund	Quintessence Theatre	Regional Theater	
2018	Oklahoma!	Will Parker	St. Ann's Warehouse	Off-Broadway	
2019	Oklahoma!	Will Parker	Circle in the Square Theatre	Broadway	
2022	Oklahoma!	Will Parker	Young Vic	Off West End	
2023	Oklahoma!	Will Parker	Wyndham's Theatre	West End	
