= James Davis (Surrey cricketer) =

English cricketer

Personal information
- Full name: James Davis
- Born: Unknown
- Died: Unknown
- Batting: Unknown
- Role: Wicket-keeper

Domestic team information
- Years: Team
- 1850: Surrey

Career statistics
Competition	First-class
Matches	4
Runs scored	1
Batting average	0.20
100s/50s	–/–
Top score	1
Balls bowled	–
Wickets	–
Bowling average	–
5 wickets in innings	–
10 wickets in match	–
Best bowling	–
Catches/stumpings	1/1
- Source: Cricinfo, 2 April 2012

James Davis (dates of birth and death unknown) was an English cricketer. Davis' batting style is unknown, though it is known he played as a wicket-keeper.

Davis made his first-class debut for England against Sussex in 1843 at the Royal New Ground, Brighton. He next appeared in first-class cricket in 1848 for the Surrey Club against the Marylebone Cricket Club at Lord's, before making two further first-class appearances for Surrey, both against Middlesex in 1850. He batted six times in his four matches, scoring just a single run and being dismissed for a duck four times. Behind the stumps he made a single catch and stumping.
