= William Pitt Root =

American poet (born 1941)

William Pitt Root (born 1941 Austin, Minnesota) is an American poet. He was raised in Fort Myers, Florida, and went on to study at the University of Washington, and University of North Carolina at Greensboro.

Root was Tucson Poet Laureate from 1997 to 2002, and taught at Hunter College. He was also a US/UK Exchange Artist, Rockefeller Foundation fellow, Guggenheim Fellow, Wallace Stegner fellow at Stanford University, and an NEA fellow.

His work appeared in Asheville Poetry Review, The Atlantic, The New Yorker, Harpers, The Nation, Commonweal, The American Poetry Review, Tri@uarterly, and Poetry. He is poetry editor of Cutthroat Magazine.

He is married to poet Pamela Uschuk; they live near Durango, Colorado and Tucson, Arizona.

== Works ==
- "Song of the Piper", Poetry Foundation
- "Temperance Poems", Poetry Foundation
- "Strange Angels: New Poems" Wins Press, 2013, ISBN 978-1-60940-319-5
- "Sublime Blue: Selected Early Odes of Pablo Neruda" Wings Press, 2013, ISBN 978-0-916727-87-1
- White Boots: New and Selected Poems of the West Carolina Wren Press, 2006, ISBN 978-0-932112-51-4
- Trace Elements from a Recurring Kingdom: The First Five Books of WPR Confluence Press, 1994, ISBN 978-1-881090-12-0
- Faultdancing, University of Pittsburgh Press, 1986, ISBN 978-0-8229-3530-8
- Invisible Guests (1983)
- Reasons for Going It on Foot Atheneum, 1981, ISBN 978-0-689-11164-8
- In the World's Common Grasses Moving Parts Press, 1981
- Coot and Other Characters Confluence Press, 1977, ISBN 978-0-917652-03-5
- Fireclock Four Zoas Night House, 1981, ISBN 978-0-939622-21-4
- Striking the Dark Air for Music Atheneum, 1973, ISBN 978-0-689-10558-6
- The Storm and Other Poems Atheneum, 1969; reprint Carnegie Mellon University Press, 2005, ISBN 978-0-88748-444-5
