= Gary Casteel =

American sculptor (born 1946)

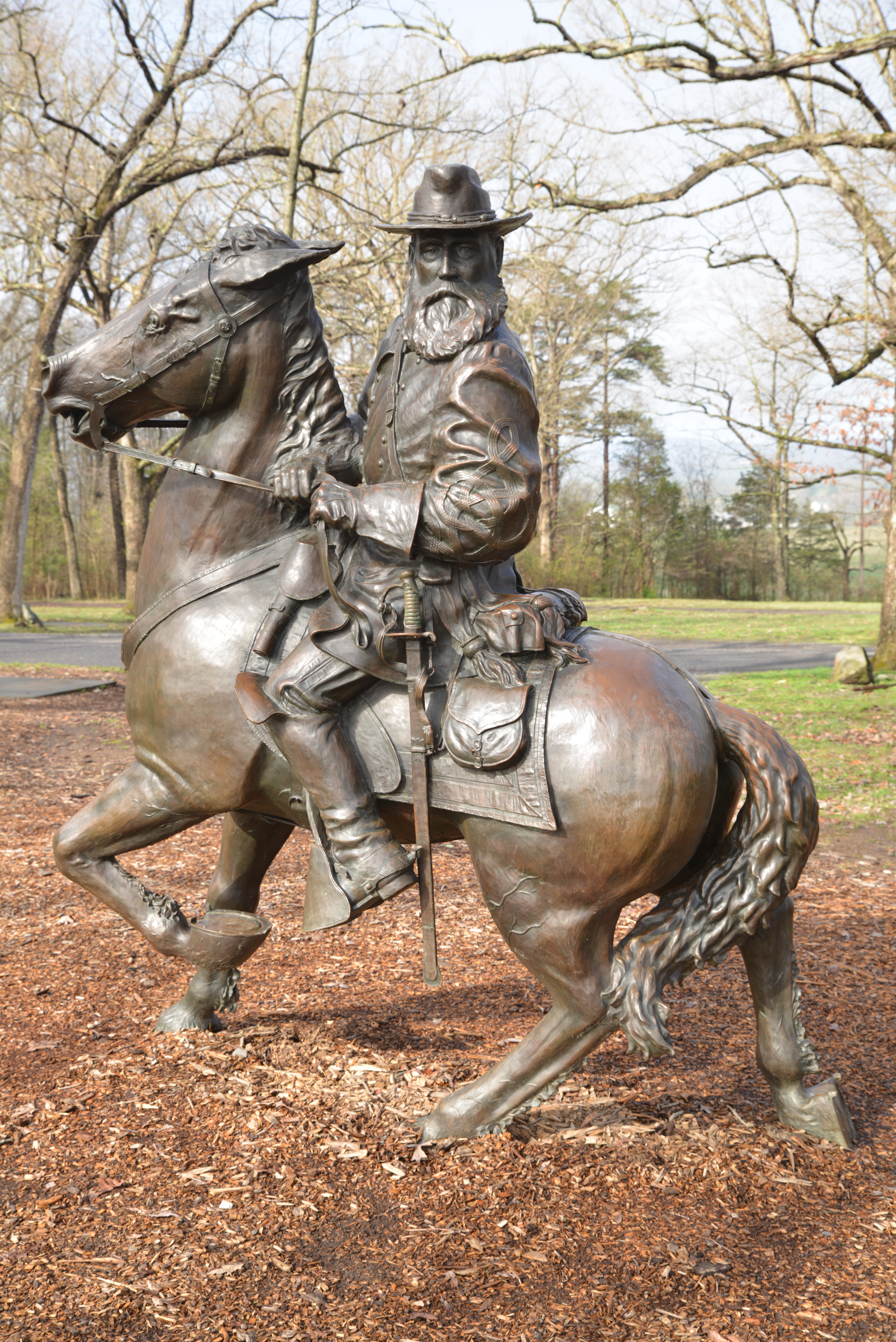
- Casteel's sculpture of General James Longstreet at Gettysburg National Military Park
- Born: 1946; West Virginia
- Occupation: Sculptor
- Known for: Bronze sculptures
- Spouse: Leslie
- Children: one daughter (Lydia Mae)
- Website: casteelsculptures.com

Gary Casteel (born 1946) is an American sculptor. One of his most notable works is the equestrian statue of Confederate States of America General James Longstreet erected in 1998 at Gettysburg National Military Park. Casteel is a proponent of establishing a National Civil War Memorial.

== Early years and career ==
Casteel was born in West Virginia in 1946. When he was in the fourth grade in school, he decided that he wanted to become a sculptor after seeing a photo of Michelangelo's David.

Casteel never enrolled in an art class. He gained experience through apprenticeships with American and European sculptors, including the Pucci family of marble carvers from Pietrasanta, Italy. Casteel honed his artistic talents as follows:

- woodcarving with Salvatore Lopez of Miami
- bronze casting with Sheidow Bronze Corporation of Kingwood, West Virginia
- clay modeling with Russell Rote of New York City.

Casteel is a Vietnam veteran. He operates his own studio and art gallery in Gettysburg, Pennsylvania.

== Selected works ==
- William C. Goodridge sculpture at the Goodridge Freedom Center in York, Pennsylvania
- Jefferson Davis & Sons statue on the grounds of Beauvoir (Biloxi, Mississippi)
- World War I Doughboy sculpture at the Army War College in Carlisle, Pennsylvania
- Robert E. Lee bronze bas-relief portrait at Sanford, North Carolina
- Jack H. Williams statue at The Boys’ Latin School of Maryland in Towson, Maryland
- Brothers an American Civil War life-size sculpture at the Virginia State Capitol in Richmond
- Monument to the 90th Pennsylvania Infantry Regiment at Antietam National Battlefield
- North Carolina Monument at South Mountain Battlefield, Fox's Gap Maryland

== Gallery ==
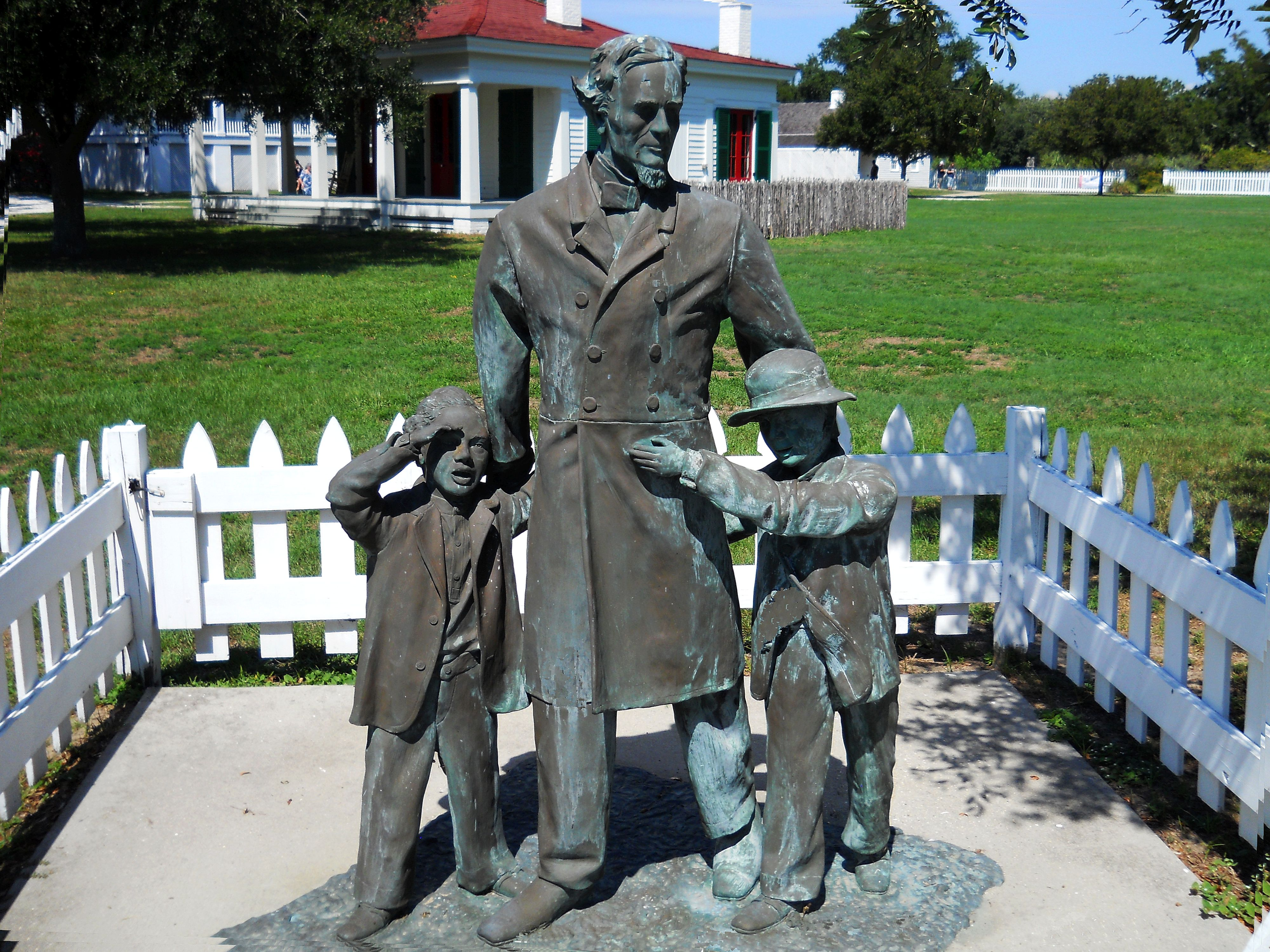
Sculpture of Jefferson Davis & sons at Beauvoir (Biloxi, Mississippi)

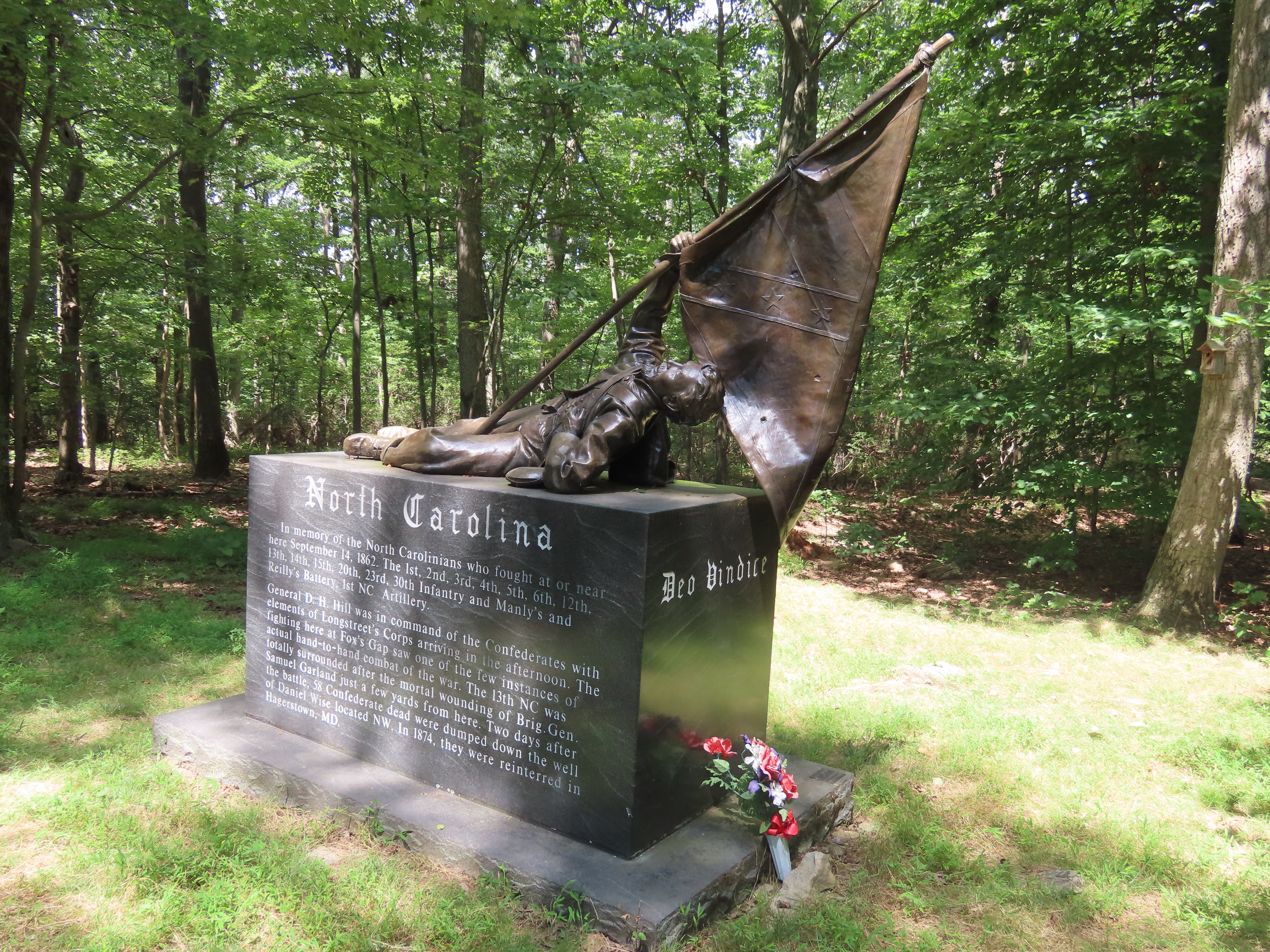
North Carolina monument at South Mountain Battlefield

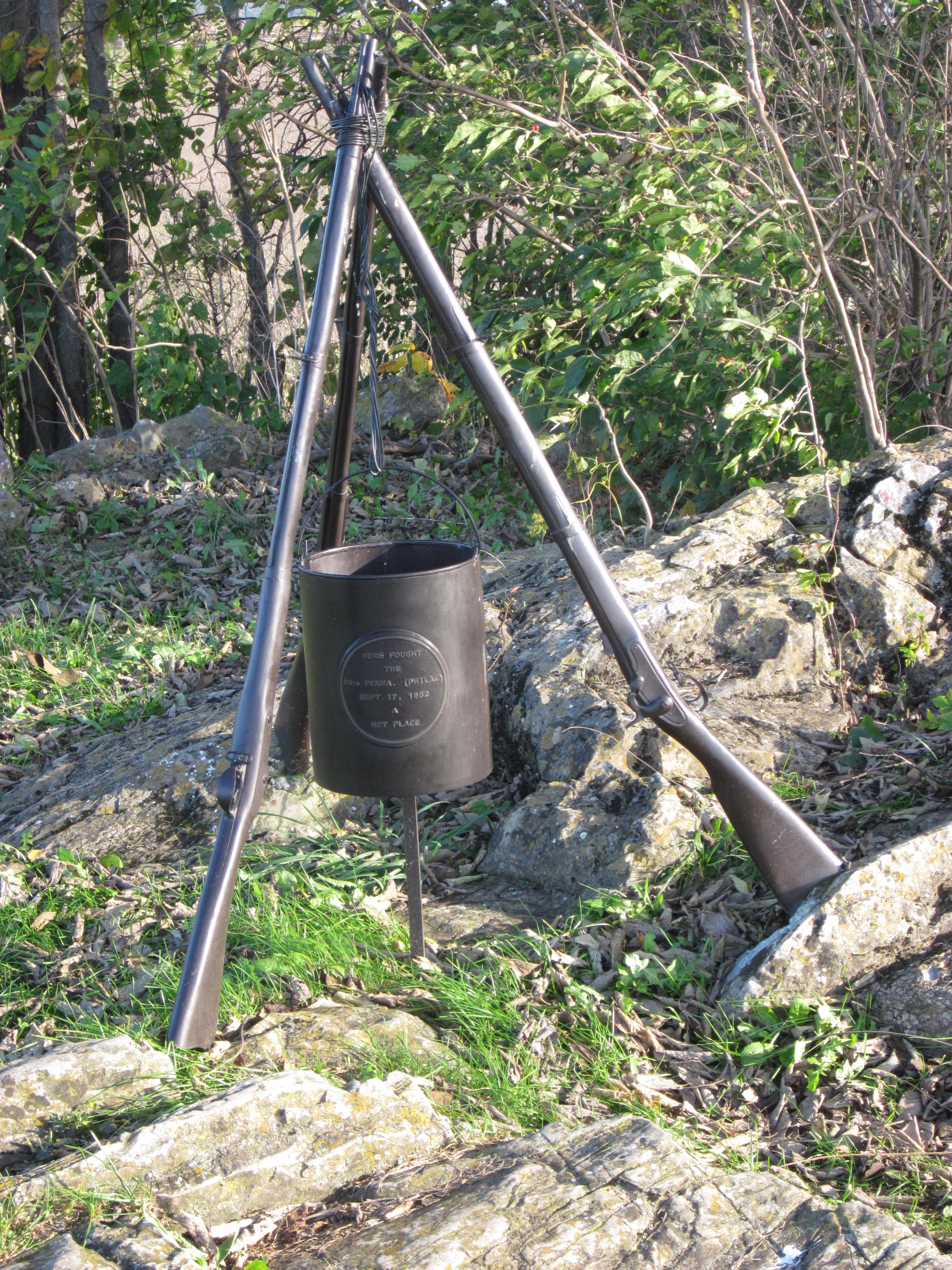
Monument to the 90th Pennsylvania Infantry Regiment at Antietam National Battlefield
