= James Levert Davis =

American AME Church bishop

- Education: Morris Brown College Turner Theological Seminary Interdenominational Theological Center
- Known for: 123rd elected and consecrated bishop in the African Methodist Episcopal (AME) Church
- Spouse: Arelis Antonia Beevers Davis

James Levert Davis is the 123rd elected and consecrated bishop in the African Methodist Episcopal (AME) Church. He was elected to the office of bishop at the 47th General Conference of the AME Church in 2004. He served as the presiding prelate of the 19th Episcopal district of the church comprising KwaZulu-Natal, Gauteng, Limpopo, Mpumalanga, North West and Free State in the Republic of South Africa. At the 48th General Conference of the AME Church in 2008 he was appointed the Presiding Prelate of the 9th Episcopal District, which comprises the State of Alabama.

Prior to his election, Davis served for twelve years as the pastor of historic Big Bethel AME Church in Atlanta, Georgia. At the 50th General Conference of the AME Church in 2016, he was appointed the Presiding Prelate of the 2nd Episcopal District which comprises portions of Maryland, Washington DC, Virginia and North Carolina.

From 2010 to 2011, Bishop Davis served as the president of the Council of Bishops. He is currently Chair of the Department of Global Witness and Ministry, which comprised the Missions Department of the AME Church, and is co-chair of the Committee on Compilation of the Book of Discipline of the AME Church.

Davis currently serves as the Presiding Prelate of the 7th Episcopal District which comprises portions of South Carolina.

== See also ==
- Methodism
- African Methodist Episcopal Church
- List of African Methodist Episcopal Churches
