= Pamela Uschuk =

American poet

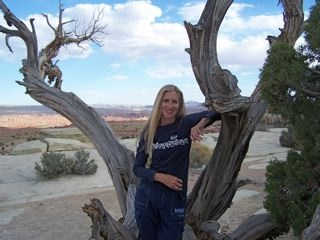
- Pam Uschuk in her homeland
- Education: Central Michigan University; University of Montana
- Spouse: William Pitt Root
- Writing career
- Genre: Poetry
- Notable awards: American Book Award, Dorothy Daniels Writing Award, National League of PEN Women, Ascent Poetry Prize, Best of the Web

Pamela Uschuk is an American poet, and 2011 Visiting Poet at University of Tennessee. She won a 2010 American Book Award, for Crazy Love: New Poems.

== Life ==
Born in 1953 and raised on a farm in Michigan, she received her B.A. In English (cum laude) from Central Michigan University. She graduated from the University of Montana with a MFA in Poetry and Fiction.

Uschuk has taught creative writing at Marist College, Pacific Lutheran University, Fort Lewis College, the University of Arizona, Salem College, where she was also Director of the Center for Women Writers, Fort Lewis College, Durango, Colorado, where she was Associate Professor of Creative Writing.

She has also taught at Greenhaven Maximum Security Prison for Men in upstate New York and in Indigenous schools on the Sioux, Assiniboine, Northern Cheyenne, Flathead, Blackfeet, Crow, Tohono O'odham and Yaqui nations.

Uschuk leads poetry workshops across the country. She is on the faculty at Ghost Ranch Jan Term, where she teaches a three-week mixed-genre writing intensive. She teaches creative writing classes at the University of Arizona's Poetry Center.

Her literary prizes include The American Book Award (Crazy Love, Wings Press, 2010), the Dorothy Daniels Writing Award from the American League of PEN Women, Simi Valley, the King's English Poetry Prize, the New Millennium Poetry Prize, the Iris Poetry Prize, The Ronald H. Bayes Poetry Prize, and the Tucson/Pima Literature Prize (FINDING PEACHES IN THE DESERT), winningwriters War Poetry Prize and Struga Poetry Prize for a theme poem. She has also won awards and honors from the Chester H. Jones Foundation, Wildwood Journal, and Amnesty International.

Her work has been translated into over a dozen languages, and it appears over 300 journals and anthologies worldwide, including Agni, American Voice, Asheville Poetry Review, Nimrod, Parabola, Parnassus, Ploughshares, Poetry, and Southeast Review.

Uschuk was the judge for the 2012 Naugatuck River Review Narrative Poetry Prize.

She married poet William Pitt Root; they live in Tucson, Arizona. During the summer, they hike and kayak near Durango, Colorado.

== Works ==
- Refugee. Red Hen Press. 2022. ISBN 978-1-63628-019-6.
- Blood Flower, Wings Press, 2015, ISBN 978-1-60940-411-6
- Wild In The Plaza of Memory, Wings Press, 2012, ISBN 978-0-916727-92-5
- Crazy Love: New Poems, 'Wings Press, 2009, ISBN 978-0-916727-58-1
- Heartbeats in Stones Codhill Press, 2005, ISBN 978-1-930337-17-6
- Scattered Risks Wings Press, 2005, ISBN 978-0-916727-12-3
- One-Legged Dancer Wings Press, 2002, ISBN 978-0-930324-76-6
- Finding Peaches in the Desert Wings Press, 2000, ISBN 978-0-930324-59-9
- John Bradley, ed. (1995). "Of Simple Intent". Atomic ghost: poets respond to the nuclear age. Coffee House Press. p. 300. ISBN 978-1-56689-027-4. "Pamela Uschuk."
- Without Birds, Without Flowers, Without Trees, Flume Press, 1990, ISBN 978-0-9613984-7-7
- Light From Dead Stars. Full Count. 1981.

In Anthology

- Melissa Tuckey, ed. (2018). Ghost Fishing: An Eco-Justice Poetry Anthology. University of Georgia Press. ISBN 978-0820353159.
- Continental Drift, editor, Drucilla Wall, publisher University of Nebraska Press, 2017.

=== Edited ===
Cutthroat, a Journal of the Arts, 2008, Volume 4, Issue 1, ISBN 978-0-9795634-1-6 "Cutthroat, a Journal of the Arts," 2011, Volume 12, Issue 1, ISBN 978-0-9795634-5-4 THE BEST OF CUTTHROAT, VOLUME 20, Issue 1 TRUTH TO POWER: WRITERS RESPOND TO THE RHETORIC OF HATE AND FEAR, 2017
