= James Davis (musical group) =

American R&B trio

JAMESDAVIS
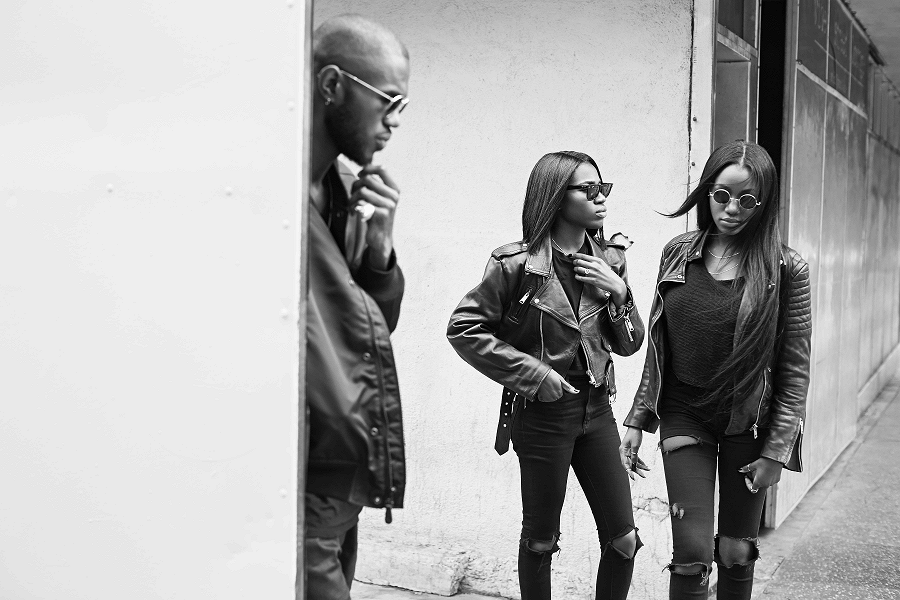
- JAMESDAVIS in 2015

Background information
- Origin: Los Angeles
- Genres: R&B; soul
- Years active: 2014–present
- Labels: Motown
- Members: Jessika "Jess" Reynolds; Erika "Rey" Reynolds; Auston Reynolds

JAMESDAVIS (formerly James Davis) is an American R&B trio based in Los Angeles. It is composed of three siblings: fraternal twins Jess and Rey Reynolds and their brother Auston Reynolds. The trio has released several EPs, including most recently, Masterpeace, in May 2019. JAMESDAVIS is currently signed to Motown.

== History ==
JAMESDAVIS is composed of fraternal twins and co-vocalists Jess and Rey Reynolds and their younger brother, producer and keyboardist Auston Reynolds. Each member of the band also sings and plays guitar, keys, and/or percussion depending on the song. Their father is a former professional baseball player and their mother a professional background singer. Jess had previously been signed to Virgin Records as a teenager and worked with songwriter, Harold Lilly. Likewise, Rey was mentored by Motown songwriter, Leon Ware. Auston also studied sound engineering.

The three began recording together as teenagers in around 2008. The group's name is a combination of the common middle name of all the men on their father's side (James) and their mother's maiden name (Davis). In around 2014, Motown president Ethiopia Habtemariam heard the group's demo and signed them to a recording contract. The trio's first Motown single, "Better Than You Are", was released in January 2015. A second single, "Co-Pilot", and its accompanying music video were released the following month. The group also released a cover of The Cranberries' song, "Zombie". In May 2015, the trio released its self-titled debut EP (James Davis) on Motown and began opening for Seinabo Sey on her U.S. tour in support. A second EP, Here It Go, was released in January 2016.

After nearly two years, the group returned in November 2017 with a mini-EP (Not The Album) and its current name stylization ("JAMESDAVIS"). In September 2018, the trio released the single, "Speedboat." The following month, that song would appear on the band's Lamplighter, Vol. 1 EP released via Motown. JAMESDAVIS also performed "Speedboat" at the Ebony Power 100 Gala in November 2018.

In 2019, the group began releasing a series of singles, including "Evergreen", "Dodger Black", and "Something To Talk About". Those songs appeared on the trio's 7-track EP, Masterpeace, released by Motown in May 2019. JAMESDAVIS also supported Leikeli47 on her North American "Acrylic" tour before playing a few shows in Europe.

== Discography ==
=== EPs ===
List of EPs, with year released
Title	Album details
James Davis	Released: May 18, 2015; Label: Motown; Format: Digital download
Here It Go	Released: January 25, 2016; Label: Motown; Format: Digital download
Not The Album	Released: November 30, 2017; Label: Motown; Format: Digital download
Lamplighter, Vol. 1	Released: October 26, 2018; Label: Motown; Format: Digital download
Masterpeace	Released: May 10, 2019; Label: Motown; Format: Digital download

=== Singles ===
List of singles with selected details
Title	Year	Album
"Better Than You Are"	2015	James Davis
"Co-Pilot"	2015	James Davis
"Speedboat"	2018	Lamplighter, Vol. 1
"Evergreen"	2019	Masterpeace
"Dodger Black"	2019	Masterpeace
"Something To Talk About"	2019	Masterpeace
