= Jimmy Davies (RAF officer) =

American World War II flying ace

- Born: 1913; Bernardsville, New Jersey, U.S.
- Died: 27 June 1940 (aged 26–27); English Channel
- Military career
- Allegiance: United Kingdom
- Branch: Royal Air Force
- Service years: 1936–1940
- Rank: Flight Lieutenant
- Service number: 37796
- Units: No. 79 Squadron RAF
- Conflicts: World War II
- Awards: Distinguished Flying Cross; Mentioned in Despatches

James William Elias Davies, DFC (1913 – 27 June 1940) was an American combat fighter pilot who was the first American-born airman to die in combat in World War II. Davies was shot down and killed on 27 June 1940. (Note: Some references quote 25 June 1940)

Although born in the United States, his family moved to Wales before the start of the war. As such, he appears in official records as being British.

== Royal Air Force service ==
Davies joined the Royal Air Force in 1936, and by 1939 was flying the Hawker Hurricane fighter with No. 79 Squadron RAF at RAF Biggin Hill. The squadron was soon in action after the outbreak of World War II and he was Mentioned in Despatches in February 1940, "for gallantry and devotion to duty in the execution of air operations."

By the end of June 1940 Davies had already claimed six German aircraft shot down and two shared, to become a flying ace. On 27 June 1940 he was in a flight of three Hurricanes sent up as an escort to protect six aircraft on a reconnaissance mission to the French port of St Valery. The three Hurricanes were attacked by three Messerschmitt Bf 109s over the English Channel, resulting in two of the Hurricanes being shot down, with F/Lt Davies posted as missing, believed killed. His name is inscribed on the Air Forces Memorial at Runnymede for airmen with no known grave.

Davies had already been awarded the Distinguished Flying Cross, with the citation for the award of his DFC published in the London Gazette the day after he was posted as missing.

Awarded the Distinguished Flying Cross.

Acting Flight Lieutenant James William Elias DAVIES (37796).

"This officer has shown ability as a leader of his squadron on many offensive patrols. On one occasion while attacking a Messerschmitt 109, he was himself attacked by six Heinkel 113s. He at once turned on the Heinkels destroying one and badly damaging a second before being compelled to break off the engagement owing to shortage of ammunition. The following day while leading a section of his squadron he sighted and attacked a large formation of Heinkel 111s and shot one down in flames."
