= Fictional portrayals of Thomas Cromwell =

Thomas Cromwell was Chief Minister to King Henry VIII of England from 1534 to 1540. He played a prominent role in the important events of Henry's reign, including the king's divorce from Catherine of Aragon, the execution of Anne Boleyn, the marriage to Anne of Cleves, the Dissolution of the monasteries, and the English Reformation. These dramatic events have provided the inspiration for plays, novels and films from shortly after his death until modern times.

Cromwell has been portrayed in a number of plays, feature films, and television miniseries, usually as a villainous character. More recently, however, Hilary Mantel's two Man Booker Prize-winning novels Wolf Hall (2009) and Bring up the Bodies (2012), and the final volume in the trilogy, The Mirror & the Light (2020), have shown Cromwell in a more sympathetic light.

== Theatre ==
=== Early plays ===
- Cromwell is the subject of Thomas Lord Cromwell, an Elizabethan-era history play from 1602. Although the Stationers' Register attributed the work to "W. S.", and it was included in the Third Folio of William Shakespeare's works published in 1662, Shakespeare's authorship is now thought unlikely.
- He is a character in Henry VIII of 1616, written by Shakespeare, in collaboration with John Fletcher.

=== Twentieth century ===
- In the original stage production of Maxwell Anderson's Anne of the Thousand Days at the Shubert Theatre, New York, in December 1948, which deals with the marriage of Henry VIII and Anne Boleyn, Cromwell was portrayed by Wendell K. Phillips. He is depicted here as totally ruthless and unscrupulous.
- Cromwell is the main antagonist in Robert Bolt's play A Man for All Seasons, in which he is portrayed as ruthlessly ambitious and jealous of Sir Thomas More's influence with the King. Cromwell was played by Andrew Keir when the play opened in London, and by Leo McKern on Broadway.
- Cromwell was portrayed by John Dougall in Shakespeare's Globe's production of Anne Boleyn by Howard Brenton in 2010, and Julius D'Silva in 2011.
- In 2014 the Royal Shakespeare Company staged an adaptation by Mike Poulton of Hilary Mantel's first two Cromwell novels. The role of Cromwell was played by Ben Miles, who repeated his portrayal of Cromwell when the production of Wolf Hall parts I and II moved to Broadway in March 2015 where he earned a Tony Award nomination for his work.

== Novels ==
- He is a major character in The Fifth Queen by Ford Madox Ford (1906).
- He is one of the major characters in H. F. M. Prescott's novel The Man on a Donkey (1952), which depicts a power struggle between Cromwell and Lord Darcy, who represents the old nobility.
- He is given minor roles in two of Philippa Gregory's novels, The Other Boleyn Girl (2001) and The Boleyn Inheritance (2006).
- The first two Matthew Shardlake historical crime fiction novels by C. J. Sansom, Dissolution (2003) and Dark Fire (2004), feature Cromwell as a leading character.
- Cromwell is the subject of Hilary Mantel's novels Wolf Hall (2009), Bring Up the Bodies (2012), and The Mirror & the Light (2020), which explore his humanity and to some extent rebut the unflattering portrait in the 1966 film A Man for All Seasons. Wolf Hall won the 2009 and Bring Up the Bodies the 2012 Man Booker Prize. Here he is imbued with family affections, genuine respect for Cardinal Wolsey, zeal for the Reformation, and support for a limited degree of social reform, while the villainous character is Thomas More.
- Cromwell is an important character in the children's book Spy Master: First Blood (2016) by Jan Burchett.

== Film ==
- Franklin Dyall portrayed Cromwell in The Private Life of Henry VIII (1933).
- In the film A Man for All Seasons (1966), Cromwell was played by Leo McKern, who also played the role on stage on Broadway.
- In the 1986 film God's Outlaw, Terrence Hardiman played Cromwell.
- Cromwell has also been portrayed by: John Colicos in the film Anne of the Thousand Days (1969); by Kenneth Williams in the classic British comedy Carry On Henry (1971); by Donald Pleasence in Henry VIII and His Six Wives (1972), and by Iain Mitchell in The Other Boleyn Girl (2008).

== Television ==
- Cromwell was played by Wolfe Morris in the BBC miniseries The Six Wives of Henry VIII (1970).
- Danny Webb played Cromwell in the Granada Television production Henry VIII (2003).
- In the television version of The Other Boleyn Girl (2003), he was played by veteran actor Ron Cook.
- In the television series The Tudors (2007), Cromwell was played by English actor James Frain; he is portrayed as Machiavellian, cunning and devoted to the English Reformation at any cost, though he is not entirely unsympathetic. Frain played the character for three seasons; Cromwell's execution brought the third season to its conclusion.
- In The Twisted Tale of Bloody Mary (2008), an independent film from TV Choice Productions, Cromwell is played by Burtie Welland.
- Actor Nick Sampson portrays Cromwell in David Starkey's 2009 documentary series Henry VIII: The Mind of a Tyrant
- Thomas Cromwell, played by Mark Rylance, is the central figure in the BBC's six-part series Wolf Hall, based on Hilary Mantel's novels Wolf Hall and Bring Up the Bodies, which was first broadcast on 21 January 2015. Rylance continued in the role in the six-part sequel, called Wolf Hall: The Mirror and the Light, based on Mantel's The Mirror and the Light, which the BBC premiered in Fall 2024. The sequel brings Cromwell from Anne Boleyn's death to his own execution.
- Cromwell is played by Sean Bean in 2024 miniseries Shardlake, based on the books of the same name by C. J. Sansom.
