= Thomas Seymour, 1st Baron Seymour of Sudeley =

English nobleman (c. 1508–1549)

The Right Honourable The Lord Seymour of Sudeley KG PC
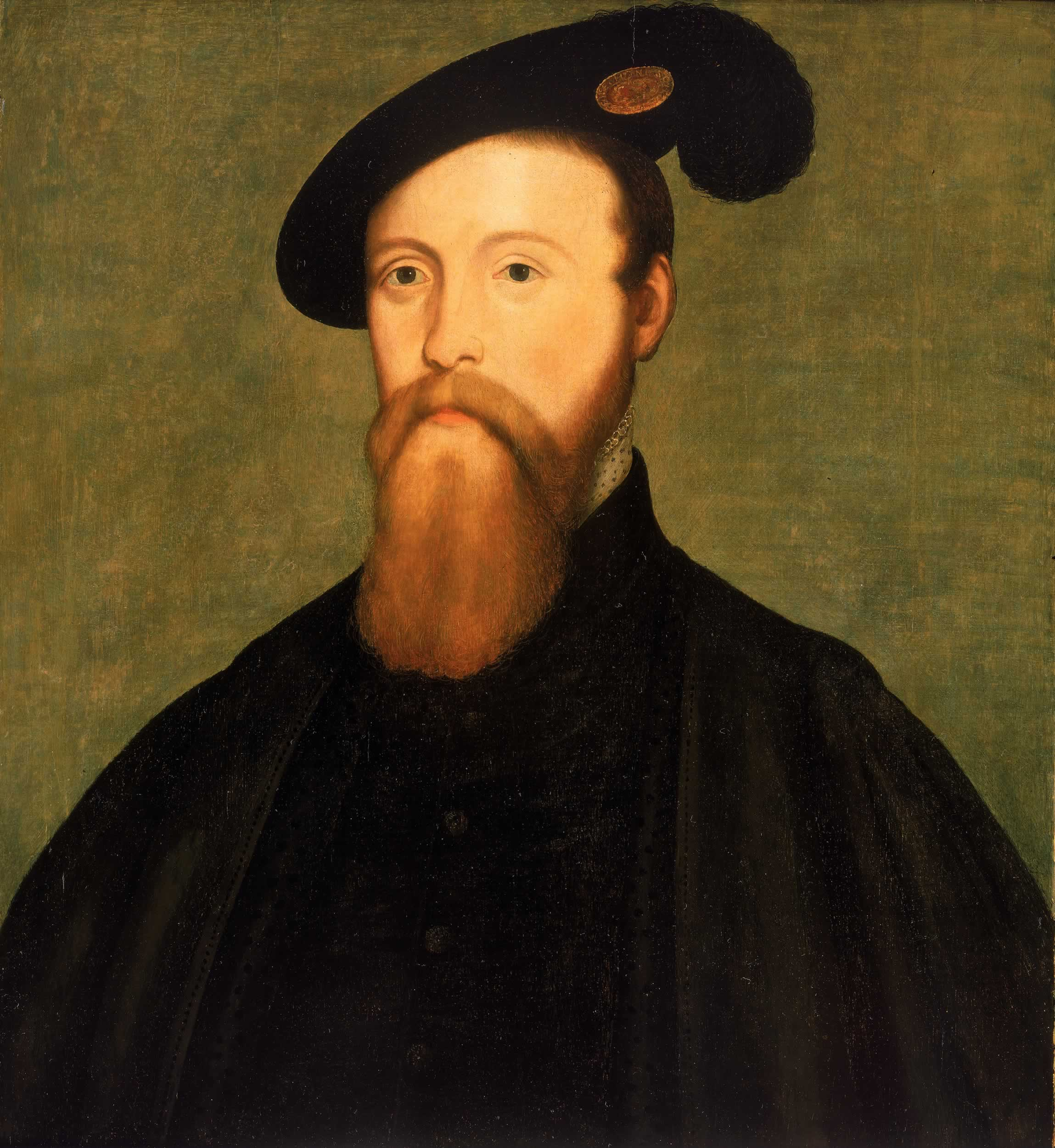
- 1547 portrait
- Born: c. 1508; Wulfhall, Wiltshire, England
- Died: 20 March 1549 (aged 40–41); Tower Hill, London, England
- Buried: Chapel Royal of St. Peter ad Vincula, Tower of London; 51.508611°N 0.076944°W
- Noble family: Seymour
- Spouse: Catherine Parr (m. 1547; died 1548)
- Issue: Mary Seymour
- Father: Sir John Seymour
- Mother: Margery Wentworth

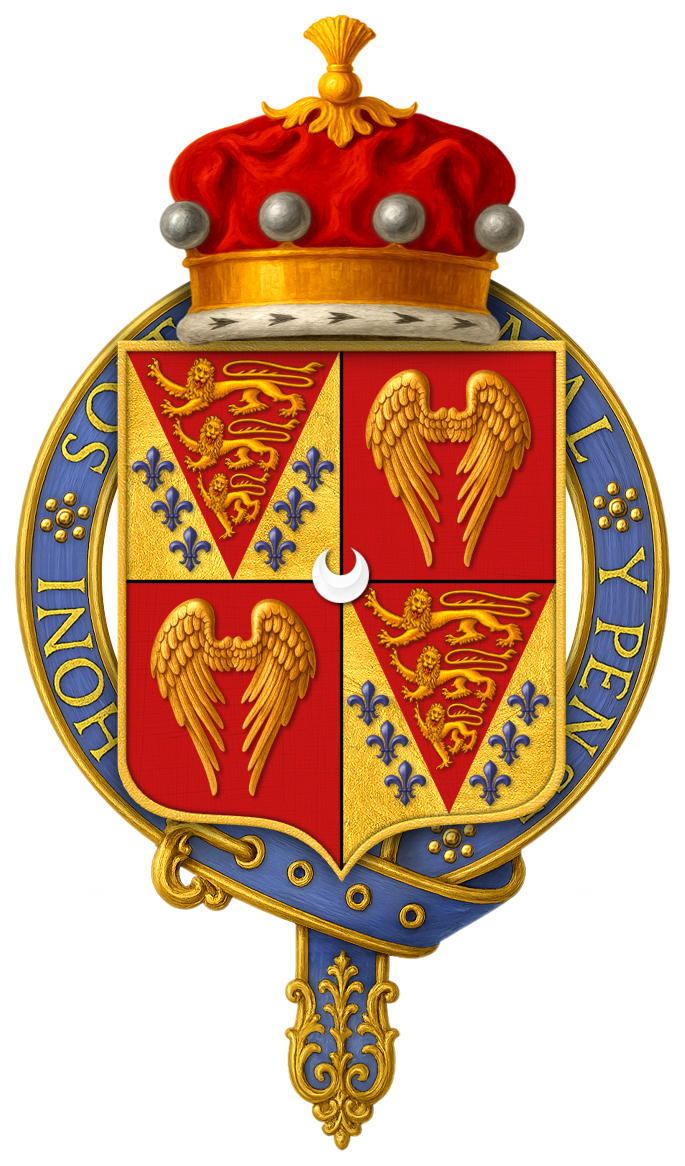
Garter-encircled arms of Sir Thomas Seymour, 1st Baron Seymour of Sudeley, KG

Thomas Seymour, 1st Baron Seymour of Sudeley (c. 1508 – 20 March 1549) was a brother of Jane Seymour, the third wife of King Henry VIII. With his brother, Edward Seymour, 1st Duke of Somerset and Lord Protector of England, he vied for control of their nephew, the young King Edward VI (r. 1547–1553). In 1547, Seymour married Catherine Parr, the widow of Henry VIII. During his marriage to Catherine, Seymour involved the future Queen Elizabeth I (then 14 years old), who resided in his household, in flirtatious and possibly sexual behaviour.

== Family and royal connections ==
Thomas Seymour was the son of Sir John Seymour and Margaret Wentworth. He was the fourth of their six sons; his elder brother Edward would become 1st Duke of Somerset. He grew up at Wulfhall, the Seymour family home in Wiltshire. The Seymours were a family of country gentry, who, like most holders of manorial rights, traced their ancestry to a Norman origin.

Henry VIII and his second wife, Anne Boleyn, did not have a son although Henry hoped for a male heir. His interests turned elsewhere, to Seymour's sister Jane, one of Anne's ladies-in-waiting. Henry married Jane eleven days after Anne's execution in May 1536, and the Seymour brothers saw their fortunes rise: in that year, Thomas became a gentleman of the privy chamber.

In October of the following year, Queen Jane gave birth to a son, Edward Tudor, who would become King Edward VI. Her two brothers, Edward and Thomas, were, therefore, uncles to the baby Edward, heir to the throne. Less than two weeks later, Jane died from complications related to childbirth.

Thomas Seymour's other royal connection was with Catherine Parr, Henry VIII's sixth wife, whom Seymour would later marry, after Henry's death. In 1543, Parr established herself as part of Princess Mary's household, where she caught the attention of the King. Although she had already begun a romantic relationship with Seymour, she saw it as her duty to accept Henry's proposal.

== Foreign affairs ==
In 1538, Seymour was sent to the embassy at the French court. He was one of those appointed to meet Anne of Cleves, King Henry's fourth wife, at Calais on 13 December 1539. A few weeks later he was sent to King Ferdinand I of Hungary, brother of Emperor Charles V, to enlist support for Henry against France and Scotland. In May 1543, he was appointed ambassador to the Habsburg court in Brussels. He was given this posting to remove him from King Henry's court, in view of the King's marriage to Catherine Parr.

When war broke out between England and France, Seymour was made marshal of the English army in the Netherlands on 26 June 1543, being second in command to Sir John Wallop. On 24 July, with a strong detachment, he captured and destroyed the castles of Rinquecen and Arbrittayne near the French port of Boulogne. For a short time, he held the chief command during Wallop's illness. Due to his position of privilege as a royal uncle and as a reward for his services, Seymour was made Master-General of the Ordnance in 1544 and Lord Warden of the Cinque Ports in 1545, both senior military positions.

== Regency Council and marriage to Catherine Parr ==
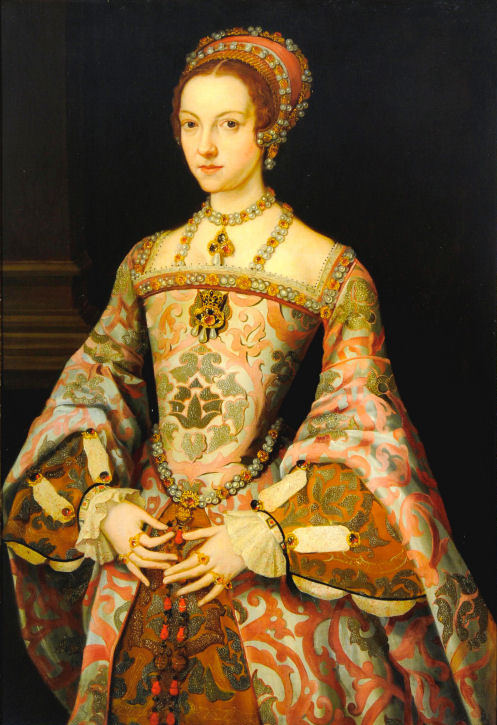
The Melton Constable or Hastings portrait of Queen Catherine Parr

Seymour returned to court just before Henry VIII died in January 1547, leaving Catherine one of the wealthiest women in England. According to the King's will, a regency council was constituted to rule on behalf of the nine-year-old orphaned King Edward. Thomas Seymour became 1st Baron Seymour of Sudeley, and his older brother Edward became Duke of Somerset, and is often, therefore, referred to as "Somerset". In addition, Thomas Seymour saw his brother rise, amid the contentious and dangerous politics of the English Reformation, to the position of chief councillor with an approved title of "Protector" regent, referred to unofficially as Lord Protector of England, in effect, ruler of the realm as regent for his nephew, the king. Thomas began to resent his brother and the relationship between them began to dissolve. Although Thomas was named Lord High Admiral as a concession, he was consumed by jealousy of his brother's power and influence and worked to unseat and replace his brother as Lord Protector.

Thomas Seymour sought to overturn his brother's position on the regency council by his personal influence over the young king, and also possibly by making a royal marriage. Although his name had been linked to Mary Howard, Duchess of Richmond, he was still unmarried at the time of Henry VIII's death. He had previously shown some interest in marrying either of Henry's daughters, Elizabeth or Mary; however, within weeks of Henry's death, Thomas Seymour had rekindled the affair with Catherine Parr, and they were secretly married in April or May 1547, too soon after the king's death to suit many. Anne Stanhope, Somerset's proud wife, disliked Catherine and Thomas and began to turn many people in court against them.

== Relationship with Elizabeth ==
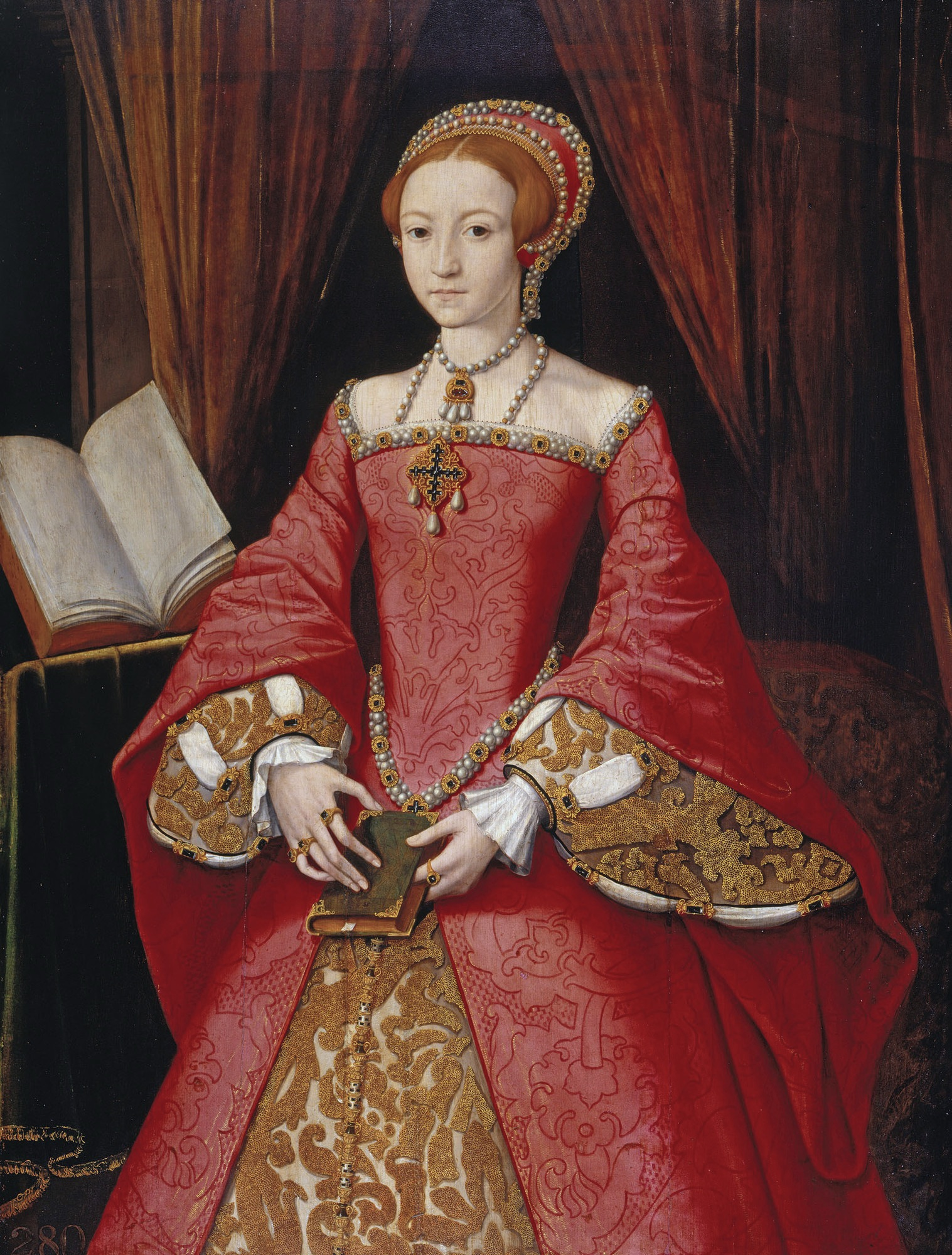
The 13-year-old Princess Elizabeth in about 1546, by an unknown artist

Upon their marriage, Seymour moved into his wife's house, Chelsea Manor in London, where she lived with her step-daughter, the 14-year-old Elizabeth. Seymour was the uncle of Elizabeth's half-brother, and the newly-wed husband of her stepmother. Now, living under the same roof as Elizabeth, Seymour indecently assaulted Elizabeth, tickling her, and slapping her on her behind as she lay in her bed, or coming into her room in his nightclothes. Her governess, Kat Ashley, thought of this as scandalous, and reported it to Catherine. Indignant, Seymour denied the accusations, "By God's precious soul, I mean no evil, and I will not leave it!".

At first, Catherine dismissed Seymour’s behaviour and Elizabeth’s governess "bade him go away in shame", she found him more amusing than dangerous. Not long after Edward VI's accession, Seymour sought to court Elizabeth by writing in his suit to the princess, "If it is my good fortune to inspire in you feelings of kindness and you will consent to marriage, you may assure yourself of having made the happiness of a man who will adore you till death". In a firmly worded rejection, she stated that "neither my age nor my inclination allows me to think of marriage". Given that Elizabeth was relatively young, second in the line of succession of the English throne and Seymour's step-daughter and niece, and that Seymour was married to the dowager queen, his behaviour was considered to be highly improper, shocking, and immoral. When Catherine was pregnant in the spring of 1548, she became concerned enough about her husband's predatory behaviour towards Elizabeth that she sent Elizabeth away to live with Anthony Denny and his wife, Joan Champernowne (Kat Ashley's sister), in Hertfordshire.

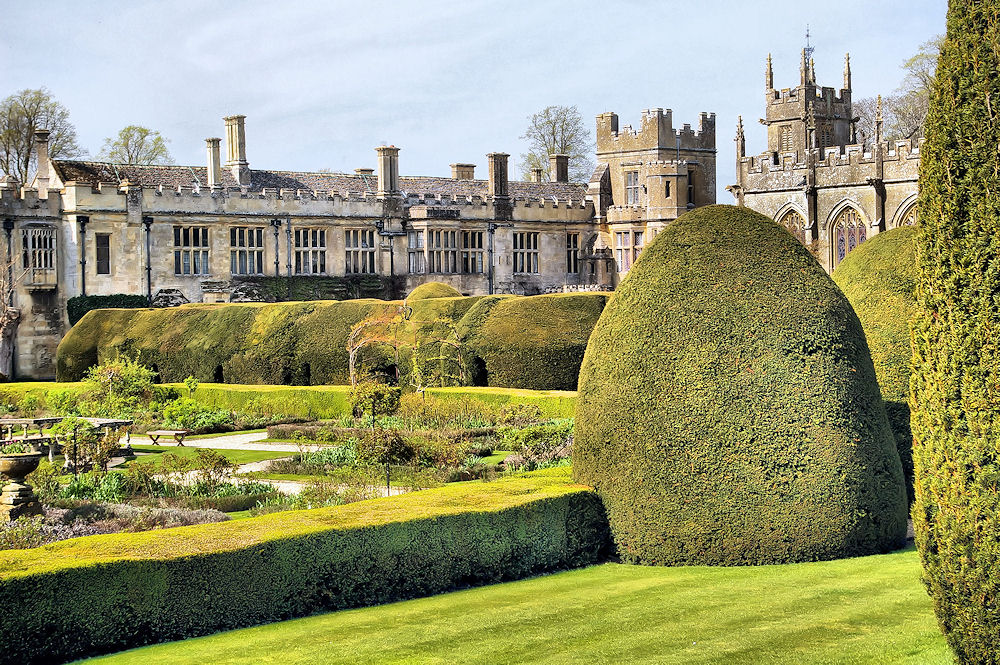
Sudeley Castle

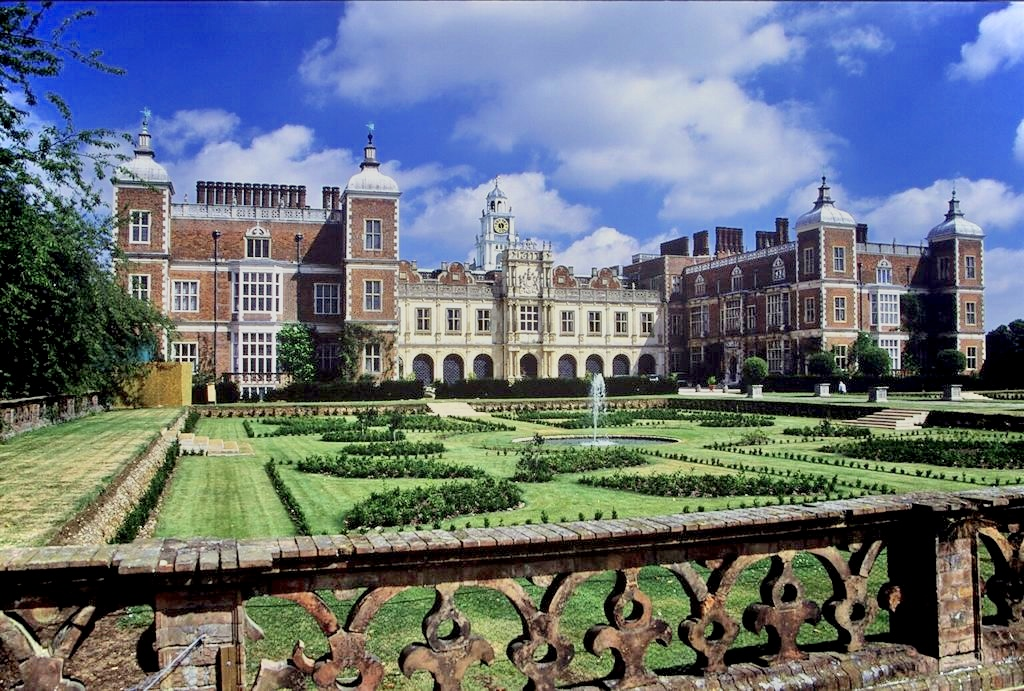
Hatfield House

In June 1548, Catherine and Thomas Seymour moved their household from London to Sudeley Castle in Gloucestershire, the property granted to Seymour when he became Baron Seymour of Sudeley. In September 1548, Catherine gave birth to a daughter, Mary Seymour. In the following days, Seymour asserted she was uncharacteristically hostile and delusional and she died of childbirth complications, just before Elizabeth's 15th birthday. Upon her death, Catherine bequeathed all of her possessions to Thomas, making him one of the wealthiest men in England. He said he was "amazed" at her death; yet it opened up new opportunities for him, as his eye returned to Elizabeth. She avoided him, returning with her governess to her childhood home, Hatfield House in Hertfordshire.

== Relationship with Edward VI ==
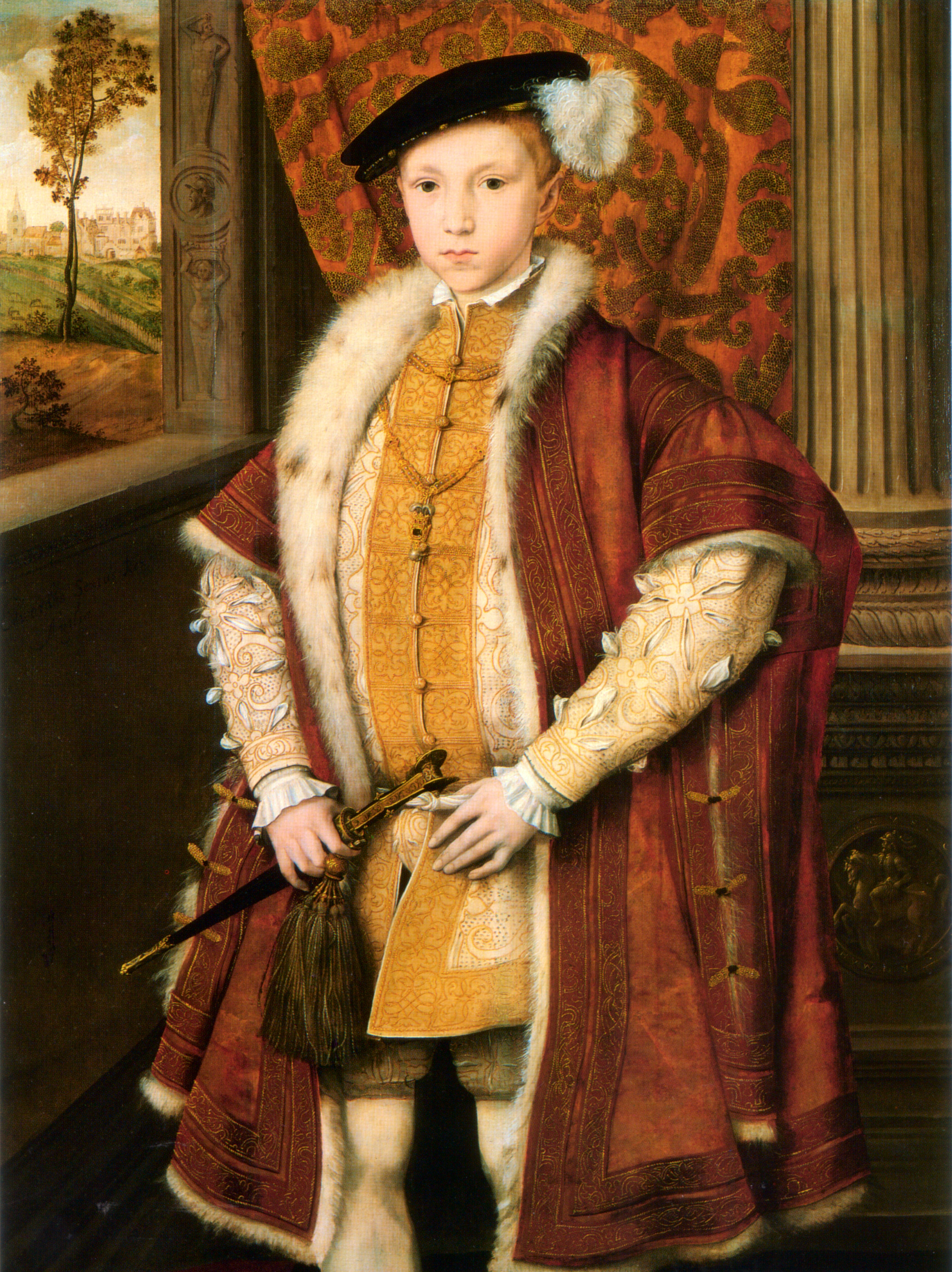
The 9-year-old King Edward VI

Despite his great wealth and high position, Thomas Seymour could not come to terms with his brother's appointment as protector; and in his struggle with Somerset, he tried to ingratiate himself with the king, who was merely a child. He sought the 9-year-old Edward to write a letter on his behalf in support of his marriage to the dowager queen, Catherine Parr. The letter was obviously dictated by Thomas for Edward's signature and only enraged Somerset. He began to visit Edward frequently, secretly giving him an extravagant allowance of coins, so that Edward might be satisfied in feeling more grown-up and more kingly, giving gifts to his servants, teachers, and friends. Even though he lived in sumptuous splendour and wanting for nothing, no provisions had been made for Edward's pocket money; he became accustomed to these regular payments and began to ask Seymour freely for his allowance.

Thomas continued his manipulation of the king. In trying to get a bill through Parliament making him Edward's personal governor, Seymour requested Edward's royal signature on the bill. But Edward was uncertain and reluctant to go behind the back of the protector, Somerset, and of the regency council, and he would not sign it. Seymour persistently pressured Edward, until Edward felt threatened. But Seymour did not give up. He tried to persuade Edward that he did not need a protector, getting Edward to admit that it might be better for Somerset to die. It is not known what the king meant by this, but it was probably uttered innocently. Seymour intended that the king's royal signature and personal support would destabilise Somerset's position as protector, and as a member of the regency council. In his frustration and inability to gain any significant influence over the king, Thomas Seymour began to think in terms of open rebellion.

== Downfall ==
In the summer of 1547, Somerset invaded Scotland. During his absence from the court, his brother, Thomas, fomented opposition to his authority, voicing open disapproval of his brother's administrative skills. Because his activities seemed suspicious, several members of the nobility advised him to be content with his position, but he would not listen. As Lord High Admiral, he was able to control the English navy, and he openly asked for support in case of a rebellion. Although it was his duty to suppress piracy, he entered into relations with pirates on the western coasts, with a view to securing their support. Thomas seems also to have hoped to finance a rebellion through crooked dealings with the vice-treasurer of the Bristol Mint, Sir William Sharington.

By 1548, the regency council was becoming aware of Thomas's bid for power. Somerset tried to save his brother from ruin, calling a council meeting so that Thomas might explain himself. However, Thomas did not appear. On the night of 16 January 1549, for reasons that are not clear (perhaps to take the young king away in his own custody), Seymour was caught trying to break into the King's apartments at Hampton Court Palace. He entered the privy garden and woke one of the King's pet spaniels. In response to the dog's barking, he shot and killed it. The next day, he was arrested and sent to the Tower of London. The incident, being caught outside the king's bedroom, at night, with a loaded pistol, was interpreted in the most menacing light, even casting suspicion on Elizabeth's involvement with Thomas. On 18 January, the council sent agents to question everyone associated with Thomas, including Elizabeth. On 22 February, the council officially accused him of thirty-three charges of treason. He was attainted of treason, condemned to death and executed on 20 March 1549. Catherine's brother William Parr, 1st Marquess of Northampton, inherited Sudeley Castle.

Seymour was a "trusty friend" of Sir Rowland Hill, who would publish the Geneva Bible, and was given land at Hoxten for life under his will. It was said that Hill "knew much of the intent and purpose" of Sir Thomas Seymour.

== Aftermath ==
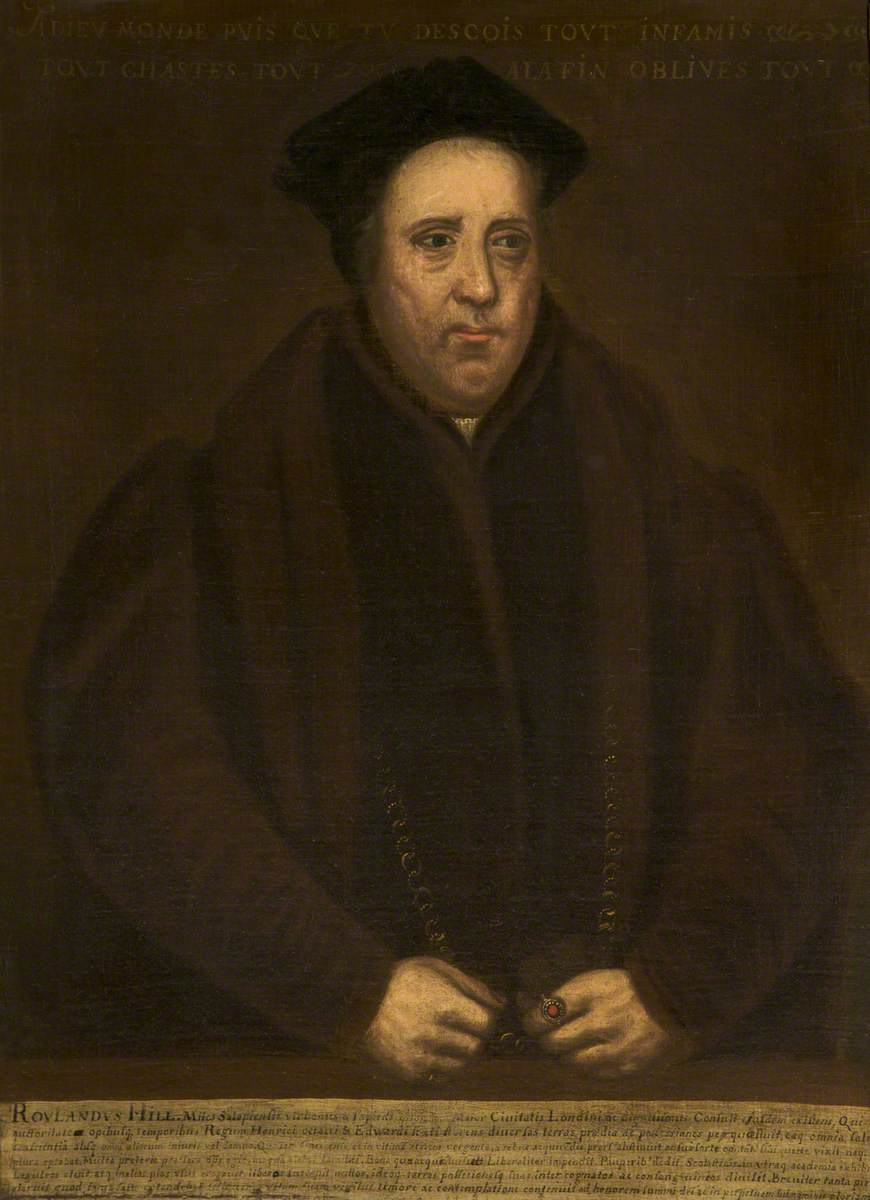
Sir Rowland Hill attended closely on Seymour

When he was arrested for treason, Seymour's associates were also cast under suspicion, including 15-year-old Elizabeth. She did not realise the danger to herself until her servants, including her governess Kat Ashley, were also arrested. Upon realising that Thomas would probably be executed, she was noticeably disconsolate, trying to free herself and her servants from suspicion. The regency council was sure of her complicity with Thomas and she was interrogated for weeks. But the council found itself in a sharply defined game of wits with Elizabeth, who proved to be a master of logic, defiance, and shrewdness. The embarrassing details of Seymour's improper behaviour towards her came to light but there was no evidence that Elizabeth had conspired with him. After his execution, all of Seymour's property was seized by the Crown. His attainder was reversed by Parliament in 1550, although the property was not returned to Mary Seymour, his only child; she is believed to have died at about the age of two, possibly while in the care of Katherine Brandon, Duchess of Suffolk. To his contemporaries, he appeared forceful and reckless, and also attractive to women. Sir Nicholas Throckmorton, a boyhood friend of King Edward, described Thomas Seymour as "hardy, wise and liberal ... fierce in courage, courtly in fashion, in personage stately, in voice magnificent, but somewhat empty of matter".

== In popular culture ==
=== Film ===
- In the 1953 film Young Bess (based on the novel of the same title by Margaret Irwin), Stewart Granger was cast as Seymour. The plot, largely a romance between him and Princess Elizabeth (played by 24-year-old Jean Simmons), had little historical accuracy.
- In the 2023 film Firebrand, Sam Riley portrayed Thomas Seymour.

=== Television ===
- In the 1970 television series The Six Wives of Henry VIII and the 1971 television series Elizabeth R, John Ronane portrays Seymour.
- In the 2007 television show The Tudors, Andrew McNair portrays Seymour. He appears in series three and four.
- In the 2015 series Wolf Hall, Iain Batchelor plays Seymour.
- In the 2022 series Becoming Elizabeth, Tom Cullen plays Seymour.

=== Literature ===
- He is a character in the C. J. Sansom novel Revelation, featuring Sansom's fictional lawyer/detective Matthew Shardlake. He is portrayed as a hot-headed military man, with designs on Catherine Parr, in the months before the latter's marriage to Henry VIII. He reappears as a secondary character in the next two novels in the series, Heartstone and Lamentation.
- Norah Lofts, in her biography of Walter Raleigh Here Was a Man, suggests that Elizabeth was attracted to Raleigh because he reminded her of Seymour.

== Notes ==
Military offices
Preceded by Christopher Morris	Master-General of the Ordnance; 1544–1547	Succeeded by Sir Philip Hoby
Political offices
Preceded by The Viscount Lisle	Lord Warden of the Cinque Ports; 1545; With: Sir Thomas Cheney	Succeeded by The Lord Cobham
Preceded by The Earl of Warwick	Lord High Admiral; 1547–1549	Succeeded by The Earl of Warwick
