= The Quickening Maze =

2009 historical fiction novel by Adam Foulds

- Author: Adam Foulds
- Language: English
- Genre: Historical fiction
- Publisher: Jonathan Cape
- Publication date: 2009
- Publication place: United Kingdom
- Pages: 272
- ISBN: 1-4090-7717-9

The Quickening Maze is a 2009 historical fiction novel by British poet and author Adam Foulds and published by Jonathan Cape. The book received the Encore Award (2009), European Union Prize for Literature (2011) and was shortlisted for Man Booker Prize (2009) and Walter Scott Prize (2010). The book is based on the historical backdrop of a mental asylum run by Matthew Allen at High Beach in late 1830s and 1840s which had English poet John Clare admitted therein. Alfred, Lord Tennyson, another notable poet of the era, moves to High Beach to get his brother Septimus treated. All the while, Alfred himself, has to overcome depression after the death of his close friend Arthur Hallam. The book narrates Clare's life, the asylum's effects on both poets and bases its storyline on the popular speculation of whether Clare and Tennyson had ever met.

== Plot ==
Dr Matthew Allen runs an asylum called High Beach Private Asylum for mental patients of his. John Clare, a peasant poet from Northamptonshire who is not so famous then, is admitted in the asylum for his lunatic behaviours, memory lapses and delusions. Dr Allen treats his patients differently from other mental institutes, by giving them a lot more freedom; especially to Clare by recognizing his talent in poetry. Alfred Tennyson's brother Septimus faces depression and he is also admitted in the asylum. Tennyson and his family move to High Beach and stay nearby the asylum. Dr Allen has a history of accumulating debts and was once imprisoned for frauds. He is now collecting funds for a new carpentry machine named "Pyroglyph", and he convinces Tennyson and his family to invest in the machine. Various patients with characteristic personalities and disorders have been included. A certain George Laidlaw is shown to be obsessed with the national debt and Margaret keeps believing that God is speaking to her. Charles Seymour is from an aristocratic family and he is wrongly placed in the asylum by his family to avoid his marriage with his lover who the family deems unsuitable for him. Various incidents of sexual violence between fellow inmates are noted in the asylum. Allen's teenage daughter, Hannah, craves for attention and starts fancying Tennyson. When she gets nothing out of it, she falls for Seymour. Tennyson is also brooding over the death of his friend Arthur Hallam and is shown working on a memorial to Hallam. Clare starts roaming about in the woods of Epping Forest coming in contact with local gypsies. He treasures these wanderings where he finds time for his poems, if he is not claiming to be a prize fighter or Lord Byron or Shakespeare. Tennyson loses much of his family fortunes because of wrong investments and decides to return to London, determined to write about Hallam. Meanwhile, Clare runs away from the institute and sets on his four-day walking journey back to his home, to finally meet his wife.

== Characters ==
- John Clare – A poet admitted to the asylum for delusions and memory lapses
- Dr Matthew Allen – The asylum's director
- Alfred, Lord Tennyson – A famous poet accompanying his ill brother
- Septimus – Tennyson's brother suffering from depression
- Eliza Allen - Dr Allen's wife
- Fulton Allen - Dr Allen's son
- Hannah Allen – Dr Allen's daughter
- Dora Allen - Dr Allen's daughter
- Abigail Allen - Dr Allen's daughter
- Oswald Allen - Dr Allen's older brother
- Judith Smith - Roma woman - a member of a Roma community Clare spends time with in a wood clearing near the asylum
- Thomas Rawnsley - Successful manufacturer
- George Laidlaw – Man obsessed with the national debt
- Margaret – Woman convinced that God speaks to her
- Charles Seymour – Aristocratic young man
- William Stockdale – Attendant
- Annabella – Hannah's friend

== History ==
John Clare was born in a poor farming family. In 1820 he had published his first poetry book which won him the epithet of "Northamptonshire Peasant Poet". In 1836 he started having memory lapses and the next year he voluntarily got admitted in Dr Allen's asylum and stayed there until he ran away in 1841 and went on his four-day walk from Essex to Werrington near Peterborough. Clare stayed with his wife for few months before being admitted to Northampton General Lunatic Asylum.

Tennyson's brother Septimus was a patient of Allen between 1837 and 1840. Tennyson and his family on various occasions stayed in the nearby houses. Tennyson invested £ 3,000 in mid-1840s in Allen's invention "Pyroglyph" and his three sisters added £ 4,000 to the investment. Failure of the machine led to bankruptcy of Allen and great loss to the Tennyson family. Tennyson left High Beach and then went on to write In Memoriam A.H.H..

Allen ran an asylum for mentally challenged people and separated it into three houses; Fair Mead for men, Springfield for women and Leopard's Hill Lodge for severe patients of either gender. Visitors and patient's relatives have noted normality kept inside the asylum. He also went on to raise a fund to enable Clare to stay independently. He died in 1845 and Tennyson got some financial help from Allen's insurance.

Historically, it is not known whether Tennyson and Clare had met each other while they both stayed together in the area in the same period. But Clare's biographer Jonathan Bate speculates that although the two poets might not have met in the asylum, both used to take walks in the forest and also had a common friend; the son of poet Thomas Campbell. However, in The Quickening Maze, the two poets never meet.

== Reception ==
The Independent in the review written by Simon Kövesi, who is editor of the John Clare Society Journal, summed the book to be "a heady mix of delicacy and grotesquery, intimacy and misanthropy." Author Adam Foulds notes that The Norton Anthology of English Literature that he studied in his college days dedicated only four pages to Clare but the poet's reputation increased significantly after Jonathan Bate published Clare's biography in 2003. Writing for The Washington Post, editor Ron Charles notes that the book is not the biography of Clare but "its finely tuned sympathy will bring you close to the soul of an exuberant poet". Charles also notes that the most moving parts of the book are of the episodes where Clare is wandering in the forest. The review in New Statesman appreciates Foulds for penning Clare's character that thinks in poems and also deemed Dr Allen and Tennyson's scenes together as awkward because of the historical nature of the book. Journalist and author Lionel Shriver notes that Foulds, who won Costa Poetry Award in 2008, keeps the book poetic without losing the plot. She also appreciates that despite featuring two poets with a background of mental asylum, the book does not "conjure insanity as an exalted state of literary enlightenment." The New Yorker's critic James Wood mentions that Foulds has created his own poems in the book; like "thick curds of summer cloud moving slowly over"; while narrating the two poets and not simply borrowing their works. Indian writer Neel Mukherjee calls the book a "subtle meditation on the mysterious nature of the creative process."

=== Awards ===
The book was nominated for the Man Booker Prize. It was shortlisted along with Hilary Mantel's historic novel Wolf Hall about Thomas Cromwell, A. S. Byatt's novel The Children's Book, Nobel laureate J. M. Coetzee's novel Summertime, Simon Mawer's novel The Glass Room and Sarah Waters's gothic fiction novel The Little Stranger. The Quickening Maze was called a "rank outsider" when it was shortlisted with these books: Mantel's work won the award, as several sources had speculated it would.

The book won the Encore Award for 2009–10 and the judges Alex Clark, Lindsay Duguid and Peter Parker described it as "a confident, beautifully written historical novel, seamed with poetry and intense descriptions of the natural world, which unobtrusively deploys its documentary underpinnings".

In 2010, it was nominated for the inaugural Walter Scott Prize where it again competed with Mawer's The Glass Room and Mantel's Wolf Hall, where Mantel won. The following year in 2011 it won the European Union Prize for Literature.
