= Alan Hillgarth =

British adventure novelist and member of the intelligence services

Captain Alan Hugh Hillgarth CMG OBE (born George Hugh Jocelyn Evans; 7 June 1899 - 28 February 1978) was a British adventure novelist and member of the intelligence services, perhaps best known for his activities in Spain during and after the Spanish Civil War. Hillgarth appears as one of the actual historical figures in C. J. Sansom's 2006 novel, Winter in Madrid, and also in María Dueñas's 2009 novel, El tiempo entre costuras (English translation 2011, The Time in Between (US), The Seamstress (UK)), as well its Spanish-language 2013 television adaptation.

== Early years ==
Hillgarth was born George Hugh Jocelyn Evans (called "Hugh" by his family) at 121, Harley Street, Marylebone, London, second of three boys and two girls of Willmott Henderson Evans (also "Willmott Henderson Hillgarth Evans"), a leading London surgeon specialising in skin diseases, and his wife Ann Frances, daughter of Rev. George Piercy, a pioneer Methodist minister in China. Hugh changed his name to "Alan Hugh Hillgarth Evans" in 1926, and in 1928 discontinued use of the surname "Hillgarth Evans" in favour of "Hillgarth". The name derived from the family legend of a rich widow Hillgarth from the north of England who married into the Evans family.

Hillgarth was educated at the Royal Naval College, Dartmouth, and during World War I he saw active service as a midshipman before being seriously wounded during a skirmish in the Dardanelles. After the war, he studied at King's College, Cambridge.

== Career ==
In the book Roosevelt & Churchill: Men of Secrets, the historian David Stafford gives an account of Hillgarth's links with Winston Churchill in prewar Majorca, where Hillgarth was the British consul. By the outbreak of World War II, Hillgarth was Naval Attaché in Madrid, where he handled a huge number of clandestine intelligence operations on behalf of the British government. He had a prominent role in Operation Mincemeat in which faked documents were used to fool the Germans about Allied plans for the invasion of Sicily. He was successful at simultaneously appearing to try to retrieve the documents before the Germans saw them but making sure that they did, all without arousing suspicion. His work here led Ian Fleming to refer to Hillgarth as a 'war-winner'.

In the biographic book Man of War, the historian Duff Hart-Davis presents a quote by Hillgarth, from one of his books, that states "adventure was once a noble appellation borne proudly by men such as Raleigh and Drake... [but is now] reserved for the better-dressed members of the criminal classes."

Hillgarth was also a member of the strange and extravagant 'Sacambaya Exploration Company,' which, in 1928, went in search of Bolivian gold. A number of British adventurers set forth on a romantic enterprise with modern machinery to excavate a treasure believed to amount to more than 12 million pounds. It turned out to be a scam, as the maps and documents turned out to have been fakes.

== Personal life ==
Alan Hillgarth married three times, at first with Violet Mary Tapper (m. 1921, dissolved): A medical practitioner whom he married in Gibraltar; the marriage lasted only a few weeks. Later with Hon. Mary Hope-Morley (m. 1929, div. 1947): Daughter of the 1st Baron Burghclere, with whom he had one son, Jocelyn (born 1929). They divorced in 1947. And later with Jean Cobb (m. 1947, d. 1975): With whom he had three children: Justin (born 1947), Tristan (born 1949), and his only daughter, Nigella (born 1953).

== Death and Legacy ==
Alan Hillgarth died on 28 February 1978 at Illannanagh, aged 78, and was buried beside his wife Jean in Terryglass churchyard.

In July 2000, a delegation of Minorcans traveled to Terryglass to honor Hillgarth's memory, installing a brass plaque in the church commemorating his role in saving their island from destruction in 1939.

== Novels ==
- — (1924). The princess and the perjurer. London: Chapman & Dodd. OCLC 10425684.
- — (1929). What price paradise?. Boston: Houghton Mifflin Co. OCLC 1630450.
- — (1933). The black mountain. London: I. Nicholson & Watson. OCLC 10425585.
- — (1966). The end of the running. London: Cassell. LCCN 67074691.
