= Walter Scott Prize =

British literary award

The Walter Scott Prize for Historical Fiction is a British literary award founded in 2010. At £25,000, it is one of the largest literary awards in the UK. The award was created by the Duke and Duchess of Buccleuch, whose ancestors were closely linked to Scottish author Sir Walter Scott, who is generally considered the originator of historical fiction with the novel Waverley in 1814.

Eligible books must have been first published in the UK, Ireland or Commonwealth in the preceding year. For the purpose of the award, historical fiction is defined as being that where the main events take place more than 60 years ago, i.e. outside of any mature personal experience of the author. (Note: Scott subtitled his first historical novel “Waverley; or, ‘Tis Sixty Years Since.”) The winner is announced each June at the Borders Book Festival in Melrose.

== Recipients ==
| Year | Author | Title | Story and setting | Result | Ref. |
|---|---|---|---|---|---|
| 2010 | Hilary Mantel | Wolf Hall | 1490s–1532 England following Thomas Cromwell | Winner | |
| 2010 | Adam Thorpe | Hodd | 1300s (approximately) following Robin Hood | Shortlist | |
| 2010 | Robert Harris | Lustrum | 106 BC-43 BC Italy following Cicero | Shortlist | |
| 2010 | Sarah Dunant | Sacred Hearts | 1500s Italy in a convent | Shortlist | |
| 2010 | Iain Pears | Stone's Fall | 1900s (early), a mystery / thriller | Shortlist | |
| 2010 | Simon Mawer | The Glass Room | 1930s Czech | Shortlist | |
| 2010 | Adam Foulds | The Quickening Maze | 1800s (early) High Beach, England following John Clare in a mental asylum and Alfred Tennyson | Shortlist | |
| 2011 | Andrea Levy | The Long Song | 1830s Jamaica | Winner | |
| 2011 | Tom McCarthy | C | 1910s Europe | Shortlist | |
| 2011 | Joseph O'Connor | Ghost Light | 1900s England and Ireland | Shortlist | |
| 2011 | C. J. Sansom | Heartstone | 1545 during summer in England | Shortlist | |
| 2011 | David Mitchell | The Thousand Autumns of Jacob de Zoet | 1799 through early or mid 1800s Japan | Shortlist | |
| 2011 | Andrew Williams | To Kill a Tsar | 1910s St. Petersburg, Russia | Shortlist | |
| 2012 | Sebastian Barry | On Canaan's Side | 1900s Ireland and Chicago | Winner | |
| 2012 | Esi Edugyan | Half-Blood Blues | 1939 Berlin, Germany and 1992 Paris, France | Shortlist | |
| 2012 | Andrew Miller | Pure | 1786 Paris, France | Shortlist | |
| 2012 | Barry Unsworth | The Quality of Mercy | 1767 in a coastal mining village in County Durham, England | Shortlist | |
| 2012 | Patrick deWitt | The Sisters Brothers | 1851 Oregon and California following a gold rush | Shortlist | |
| 2012 | Alan Hollinghurst | The Stranger's Child | 1913 - 1980s or '90s Europe | Shortlist | |
| 2013 | Tan Twan Eng | The Garden of Evening Mists | 1940s and '50s Malaya | Winner | |
| 2013 | Hilary Mantel | Bring Up the Bodies | 1532–1536 England following Thomas Cromwell | Shortlist | |
| 2013 | Rose Tremain | Merivel: A Man of His Time | 1600s England, France, and Switzerland | Shortlist | |
| 2013 | Thomas Keneally | The Daughters of Mars | 1910s Europe | Shortlist | |
| 2013 | Anthony Quinn | The Streets | 1880s London | Shortlist | |
| 2013 | Pat Barker | Toby's Room | 1912 and 1917 London, England | Shortlist | |
| 2014 | Robert Harris | An Officer and a Spy | 1896 - 1906 France following the Dreyfus affair | Winner | |
| 2014 | Andrew Greig | Fair Helen | 1590s in the Borderland of Scotland and England | Shortlist | |
| 2014 | Jim Crace | Harvest | 1700s rural England following the Inclosure acts | Shortlist | |
| 2014 | Kate Atkinson | Life After Life | 1910 - 1960s or later England and Germany | Shortlist | |
| 2014 | Eleanor Catton | The Luminaries | 1866 Hokitika, New Zealand following a gold rush | Shortlist | |
| 2014 | Ann Weisgarber | The Promise | 1900 Galveston hurricane | Shortlist | |
| 2015 | John Spurling | The Ten Thousand Things | 1300s China | Winner | |
| 2015 | Kamila Shamsie | A God in Every Stone | 1910s India | Shortlist | |
| 2015 | Damon Galgut | Arctic Summer | 1900s (early) India | Shortlist | |
| 2015 | Adam Foulds | In the Wolf's Mouth | 1930s and / or '40s Italy | Shortlist | |
| 2015 | Helen Dunmore | The Lie | 1910s England | Shortlist | |
| 2015 | Martin Amis | The Zone of Interest | 1940s Germany in Auschwitz | Shortlist | |
| 2015 | Hermione Eyre | Viper Wine | 1600s England | Shortlist | |
| 2016 | Simon Mawer | Tightrope | 1940s France | Winner | |
| 2016 | Patrick Gale | A Place Called Winter | 1900s (early) Saskatchewan | Shortlist | |
| 2016 | Allan Massie | End Games in Bordeaux | 1940s France | Shortlist | |
| 2016 | Gavin McCrea | Mrs Engels | 1800s England | Shortlist | |
| 2016 | Lucy Treloar | Salt Creek | 1800s (mid) Australia | Shortlist | |
| 2016 | William Boyd | Sweet Caress | 1910s - 1970s England, Germany, United States, France, Vietnam, and Scotland | Shortlist | |
| 2017 | Sebastian Barry | Days Without End | 1860s United States (mostly) | Winner | |
| 2017 | Jo Baker | A Country Road, a Tree | 1940s France | Shortlist | |
| 2017 | Francis Spufford | Golden Hill | 1746-1813 New York, United States | Shortlist | |
| 2017 | Graham Swift | Mothering Sunday | 1924 Britain | Shortlist | |
| 2017 | Hannah Kent | The Good People | 1825 County Kerry, Ireland | Shortlist | |
| 2017 | Rose Tremain | The Gustav Sonata | 1937 - 2002 Switzerland | Shortlist | |
| 2017 | Charlotte Hobson | The Vanishing Futurist | 1900s (early) Russia (when it was part of the Soviet Union) | Shortlist | |
| 2018 | Ben Myers | The Gallows Pole | 1700s Yorkshire, England | Winner | |
| 2018 | Paul Lynch | Grace | 1800s Ireland | Shortlist | |
| 2018 | Jennifer Egan | Manhattan Beach | 1930s and '40s Manhattan Beach, Brooklyn, New York and San Francisco, California | Shortlist | |
| 2018 | Rachel Malik | Miss Boston and Miss Hargreaves | 1940 - 1960 or later Manchester, England | Shortlist | |
| 2018 | Jane Harris | Sugar Money | 1760s Martinique and Grenada | Shortlist | |
| 2018 | Patrick McGrath | The Wardrobe Mistress | 1940s London | Shortlist | |
| 2019 | Robin Robertson | The Long Take | 1940s and later New York, Los Angeles, and San Francisco, all cities in the United States. Told in poetry and following a Canadian American World War II veteran. | Winner | |
| 2019 | Peter Carey | A Long Way From Home | 1950s Australia | Shortlist | |
| 2019 | Cressida Connolly | After the Party | 1938 England | Shortlist | |
| 2019 | Andrew Miller | Now We Shall Be Entirely Free | 1809 Spain | Shortlist | |
| 2019 | Samantha Harvey | The Western Wind | 1491 Somerset, England | Shortlist | |
| 2019 | Michael Ondaatje | Warlight | 1945 and '59 London, England | Shortlist | |
| 2020 | Christine Dwyer Hickey | The Narrow Land | 1950s Cape Cod | Winner | |
| 2020 | Marguerite Poland | A Sin of Omission | 1800s (late) South Africa and England | Shortlist | |
| 2020 | Joseph O'Connor | Shadowplay | 1878 London, England | Shortlist | |
| 2020 | Isabella Hammad | The Parisian | 1900s (approximately) Europe and Palestine | Shortlist | |
| 2020 | Tim Pears | The Redeemed | 1910s West Country, England | Shortlist | |
| 2020 | James Meek | To Calais, in Ordinary Time | 1300s England | Shortlist | |
| 2021 | Hilary Mantel | The Mirror & the Light | 1536–1540 England following Thomas Cromwell | Winner | |
| 2021 | Kate Grenville | A Room Made of Leaves | 1780s and later Australia | Shortlist | |
| 2021 | Maggie O'Farrell | Hamnet | 1500s Stratford-upon-Avon, England | Shortlist | |
| 2021 | Pip Williams | The Dictionary of Lost Words | 1880s–1920s Oxford, England | Shortlist | |
| 2021 | Steven Conte | The Tolstoy Estate | 1812 and 1941 Russia | Shortlist | |
| 2022 | James Robertson | News of the Dead | Different eras in fictitious glen in the Highlands | Winner | |
| 2022 | Andrew Greig | Rose Nicholson | 1570s Scotland | Shortlist | |
| 2022 | Amanda Smyth | Fortune | 1920s Caribbean following an oil rush | Shortlist | |
| 2022 | Colm Tóibín | The Magician | 1900s Europe following Thomas Mann | Shortlist | |
| 2023 | Lucy Caldwell | These Days | 1940s Northern Ireland following the Belfast Blitz | Winner | |
| 2023 | Adrian Duncan | The Geometer Lobochevsky | 1800s rural Ireland | Shortlist | |
| 2023 | Robert Harris | Act of Oblivion | 1600s England | Shortlist | |
| 2023 | Elizabeth Lowry | The Chosen | 1800s England following Thomas Hardy | Shortlist | |
| 2023 | Fiona McFarlane | The Sun Walks Down | 1800s South Australia | Shortlist | |
| 2023 | Simon Mawer | Ancestry | 1850s Crimea and England | Shortlist | |
| 2023 | Devika Ponnambalam | I Am Not Your Eve | 1800s Tahiti following Paul Gauguin | Shortlist | |
| 2024 | Kevin Jared Hosein | Hungry Ghosts | 1940s Trinidad; an epic story | Winner | |
| 2024 | Tom Crewe | The New Life | 1890s London, England following the gay community | Shortlist | |
| 2024 | Joseph O'Connor | My Father's House | 1930s and / or '40s Rome, Italy following Jews and POWs who escape from the Gestapo | Shortlist | |
| 2024 | Kai Thomas | In the Upper Country | 1800s Ontario, Canada following refugees from the Underground Railroad who resettle there | Shortlist | |
| 2024 | Rose Tremain | Absolutely and Forever | 1960s London, England and Paris, France following broken relationships | Shortlist | |
| 2024 | Tan Twan Eng | The House of Doors | 1900s Penang, Malaysia following a murder mystery | Shortlist | |
| 2025 | Andrew Miller | The Land in Winter | 1962 and '63 Britain following the Big Freeze | Winner | |
| 2025 | Kevin Barry | The Heart in Winter | 1890s Montana, United States following a mining community | Shortlist | |
| 2025 | Angharad Hampshire | The Mare | 1930s or later Germany following the Nazi war criminal Hermine Braunsteiner | Shortlist | |
| 2025 | Francesca Kay | The Book of Days | 1540s or later Britain following the end of the reign of Henry VIII | Shortlist | |
| 2025 | Ferdia Lennon | Glorious Exploits | 430s BC or later Sicily during the Peloponnesian War | Shortlist | |
| 2025 | Yael van der Wouden | The Safekeep | 1961 Netherland | Shortlist | |
| 2026 | Alice Jolly | The Matchbox Girl | 1930s or '40s Austria following a nonverbal girl during Nazi rule | Winner | |
| 2026 | Graeme Macrae Burnet | Benbecula | 1857 Benbecula, an island on the west coast of Scotland, following a triple murder | Shortlist | |
| 2026 | Rachel Seiffert | Once the Deed Is Done | 1940s or later following aftermath of WWII | Shortlist | |
| 2026 | Jo Harkin | The Pretender | 1480s England (during the transition from Richard III to Henry VII) | Shortlist | |
| 2026 | Benjamin Wood | Seascraper | 1960s in Longferry, a fictionalized coastal town based on Southport, in Northwest England | Shortlist | |
