= Lamentation (novel) =

2014 novel by C. J. Sansom

- First edition cover
- Author: C. J. Sansom
- Language: English
- Series: Matthew Shardlake Series
- Subject: Crime
- Genre: Historical mystery
- Publisher: Macmillan
- Publication date: October 23rd 2014
- Publication place: United Kingdom
- Media type: Hardback
- Pages: 650
- ISBN: 9781447260257
- Preceded by: Heartstone
- Followed by: Tombland

Lamentation is a historical mystery novel by British author C. J. Sansom. It is his eighth novel and the sixth entry in the Matthew Shardlake Series, following 2010's Heartstone. Set in the summer of 1546, King Henry VIII is dying while the Catholic and Protestant factions of his court are battling for power over his successor, Prince Edward. Matthew Shardlake is deep in work and still feeling the shock of the events of the previous year when Queen Catherine Parr, caught in the throes of the power struggle, again seeks his aid when a potentially controversial manuscript, Lamentation of a Sinner, is stolen from her chambers.

In 2021, BBC Radio 4 aired a full-cast adaptation of the novel, dramatised by Colin MacDonald, with Justin Salinger starring as Shardlake.

== Characters ==
Historical characters portrayed in the novel include:

- Henry VIII (King of England)
- Catherine Parr (Queen of England; the King's sixth wife)
- Princess Elizabeth (the later Queen Elizabeth I)
- William Parr, 1st Baron Parr of Horton (Lord Chamberlain and the Queen's uncle)
- William Paget, 1st Baron Paget (secretary to the King)
- Bishop Gardiner (bishop and politician)
- Richard Rich, 1st Baron Rich (statesman)
- Thomas Wriothesley, 1st Earl of Southampton (statesman)
- Edward Seymour, 1st Duke of Somerset (statesman and later Lord Protector of England)
- Thomas Seymour, 1st Baron Seymour of Sudeley (nobleman)
- Bishop Cranmer (Archbishop of Canterbury)
- Anne Askew (protestant preacher, executed for heresy)

Fictional characters include:

- Matthew Shardlake
- Jack Barak (Shardlake's assistant)
- Nicholas Overton (Shardlake's new assistant)
- Tamasin Barak, b. Reedbourne (Jack's wife)
- Guy Malton (physician, former monk)

== Reception ==
Critical reception for Lamentation has been positive. Alfred Hickling writing for The Guardian compared the book's theme to that of Sansom's previous novel Dominion and noted that "Sansom's recent foray into alternate history was not quite as much of a diversion as it first appeared. ...both novels address the critical moment when a tyrant weakens and a ruthless power struggle develops to fill the vacuum."

The Independent's Jane Jakeman wrote that "Sansom brilliantly conveys the uncertainty of the time when a frail young prince would ascend the throne with different factions fighting for regency" and The Spectator's Alan Judd gave a particularly glowing review writing that "The orchestration of plot over 600 pages, and the final twist, is literary craft of a high order" and concluding his review by writing "With the Shardlake series, and with this volume in particular, Sansom has surely established himself as one of the best novelists around."
