= The Long Take =

2018 narrative poetry novel by Robin Robertson

The Long Take, or A Way to Lose More Slowly
- First edition cover
- Author: Robin Robertson
- Audio read by: Kerry Shale
- Cover artist: Howard Maxwell (photo); Tyler Comrie (design)
- Language: English
- Genre: Narrative poetry
- Set in: United States
- Publisher: Picador
- Publication date: 22 February 2018
- Publication place: United Kingdom
- Media type: Print (hardcover and paperback), e-book, audiobook
- Pages: 256
- Awards: Goldsmiths Prize (2018); Walter Scott Prize (2019)
- ISBN: 978-1-5098-4688-7
- Dewey Decimal: 821/.914
- LC Class: PR6068.O1925 L66 2018b

The Long Take, or A Way to Lose More Slowly, known simply as The Long Take, is a novel in narrative poetry form with noir style by Scottish poet Robin Robertson. It was published in 2018 by Picador. The story-line is set in United States post World War II. Robertson received the Goldsmiths Prize, Walter Scott Prize and was shortlisted for the Booker Prize for this work.

== Content and publishing ==
The 200+ page novel is composed of verse and prose. The protagonist is Walker, who is an allied war veteran who served during the invasion of Normandy in 1944. He was born in Nova Scotia, but has hallucinatory memories and does not want to go back home. He instead goes to New York, San Francisco and Los Angeles. He heads to New York first and happens to meet film noir director Robert Siodmak at a bar. He sees the making of various noir films and this helps in setting timelines within the novel. He works at docks and later moves to Los Angeles and starts writing for a newspaper. His work takes him to San Francisco where he reports on the situation of homeless citizens. Ironically, when he returns to Los Angeles, his neighborhood is being destroyed to make way for new infrastructure. Various other characters in the novel include Billy Idaho, who is a Utah Beach veteran and narrates the history of Los Angeles to Walker. Another veteran Frank, known as "Glassface", was the victim of torture by Nazi Party's Hitlerjugend (Hitler Youth). Pike is a reporter and his character is used to represent the future youth and internet culture of selfies. The narrative also brings out references to other historical events like Highland Clearances and Trail of Tears.

Before The Long Take, Robertson had published six poetry collections and was the editor for various notable novelists and poets like John Banville, Anne Enright, James Kelman, Irvine Welsh, Anne Carson and Alice Oswald.

== Review and reception ==
The Washington Post's Sibbie O'Sullivan calls the novel "a propulsive verbal tour de force" comparing it with works of Homer and T. S. Eliot. John McAuliffe, who teaches poetry at the University of Manchester's Centre for New Writing and writing for The Irish Times appreciates the narrative poetry style for "emphasising intensity and tone with its line-breaks and stanzas". Rory Waterman for The Times Literary Supplement calls the novel "immaculately researched in terms of geography, current affairs, and its constant cultural touchstones in the Hollywood films of the time".

The novel won the 2018 Roehampton Poetry Prize, organized by University of Roehampton. It won the 2018 Goldsmiths Prize with Adam Mars-Jones, who chaired the judging committee, calling it "a film noir verse novel full of blinding sunlight and lingering shadows, technically accomplished, formally resourceful and emotionally unsparing". It was shortlisted for the 2018 Booker Prize, and won the 2019 Walter Scott Prize with Robertson becoming the first Scot and first poet to win the award.
