= J. C. Stobart =

English scholar (1878–1933)

John Clarke Stobart (5 March 1878 – 11 May 1933), commonly known as J. C. Stobart, was a classical scholar, a University of Cambridge lecturer, an HM Inspector of Schools and the BBC's first Director of Education.

== Early life ==
Known as 'Jack' to his relations and friends, Stobart was born in Swyre Rectory, Dorset, England, on 5 March 1878. His father, William Stobart, was the Rector, his mother was Susan Elizabeth (née Morris), the daughter of a farmer in Rutland, and he had two elder sisters. Soon after his birth his father was appointed Rector of Bermondsey in London and the family moved to London. He was educated at Rugby School and as a Bell Scholar at Trinity College, Cambridge, obtaining his BA in 1901 (MA in 1904). He also studied briefly at Greifswald University in Germany and in Edinburgh, before becoming a teacher at Merchant Taylor's School in London.

In 1904, he married Mary Currey Gibson, daughter of the Reverend Thomas Gibson, Vicar of St Sepulchre's in London. They had two daughters, Elizabeth and Margaret, both born in Cambridge, where in 1907 Stobart became a lecturer at Trinity College. Two years later he was appointed one of His Majesty's Inspectors of Schools and during the First World War worked for the Ministry of Munitions before acting as Assistant Secretary to the British War Cabinet of 1917–18.

== BBC ==
After the war, he helped organise the 1924 British Empire Exhibition at Wembley and in 1925 joined the BBC as its first Director of Education. He was responsible for two long-lasting programmes, Children's Hour and The Epilogue and according to one source suggested the BBC's motto, 'Nation Shall Speak Peace Unto Nation]'. He also proposed creating a new cultural network, to be named the Minerva programme, after the Roman goddess of wisdom, but this idea was turned down and was not realised until the creation of 'The Third Programme' at the end of the Second World War.

Stobart became well-known all over the world for his regular New Year's Eve broadcast, 'The Grand Good-night'. He was dying of diabetes when he broadcast his last Grand Good-night on 31 December 1932, from his bedroom in Kensington.

== Books ==
Stobart's books were successful, partly because they combined a popular with scholarly approach and partly because of the photographic illustrations. He wrote in a Preface: "The pictures are an integral part of my scheme. It is not possible with Rome, as it was with Greece, to let pictures and statues take the place of wars and treaties. Wars and treaties are an essential part of the Grandeur of Rome...the pictures are chosen so that the reader's eye may be able to gather its own impression of the Roman genius."

He disagrees with Edward Gibbon's pessimistic view of the Decline and Fall of the Roman Empire, pointing out that "The mere notion of empire continuing to decline and fall for five centuries is ridiculous" and remarking that "this is one of the cases which prove that History is made not so much by heroes or natural forces as by historians", since "if all the Roman historians had perished and only the inscriptions remained we should have a very different picture of the Roman Empire, a picture much brighter and, I think, much more faithful to truth". He admires the Romans for their law, discipline, engineering and especially their sanitation, but it is clear that he prefers the Greeks for their art, philosophy, mathematics and literature.

== Death ==
Stobart wrote and edited several other books on English and Classical literature. Two books, The Divine Spark and The Gospel of Happiness were published posthumously. He died on 11 May 1933, at his country cottage next to West Byfleet golf-course in Surrey and was buried at Old Byfleet, where his grave can still be seen. The offer of a knighthood was in the post when he died.

His daughter, Elizabeth Frances, married Antony Cuthbert Spurling (1906–1984), QC, resident magistrate and Crown Counsel at Kisumu and Nairobi, later Solicitor-General of Trinidad, and Attorney-General of Gambia and of Sierra Leone, and was mother of the playwright and author John Spurling.

== Major works ==
- The Glory That Was Greece (1911), ISBN 0-283-48455-1
- The Grandeur That Was Rome (1912), ISBN 0-312-03101-7
