= Robin Robertson =

Scottish poet (born 1955)

Robin Robertson FRSL
- Born: 1955 (age 70–71); Scone, Perthshire, Scotland
- Occupation: Poet
- Writing career
- Notable works: A Painted Field, Swithering, The Wrecking Light, The Long Take
- Notable awards: 1997 Forward Prize; 2004 E. M. Forster Award; 2019 Walter Scott Prize

Robin Robertson FRSL (born in 1955) is a Scottish poet.

== Biography ==
Selkie
(Written in memory of Michael Donaghy)

"I'm not stopping,"
he said, shrugging off his skin
like a wet-suit, then stretching it
on the bodhran's frame,
"let's play."
And he played till dawn:
all the jigs and reels
he knew, before he stood
and drained the last
from his glass, slipped back in
to the seal-skin,
into a new day, saluting us
with that famous grin:
"That's me away."

— "Selkie" from Swithering (Picador, 2006)

Robertson was brought up on the north-east coast of Scotland, but has spent most of his professional life in London. After working as an editor at Penguin Books and Secker and Warburg, he became poetry and fiction editor at Jonathan Cape.

Robertson's poetry appears regularly in the London Review of Books and The New York Review of Books, and is represented in many anthologies. In 2004, he edited Mortification: Writers' Stories of Their Public Shame, which collects seventy commissioned pieces by international authors. In 2006 he published The Deleted World, a new version of the Swedish poet Tomas Tranströmer, and in 2008 a new translation of Medea, which has been dramatised for stage and radio. Robertson was a trustee of the Griffin Trust for Excellence in Poetry (and is now a trustee emeritus).

== Awards ==
Robertson's first volume of poetry, A Painted Field, won the 1997 Forward Prize for Best First Collection and the Scottish First Book of the Year Award. Slow Air followed in 2002, and his third book, Swithering, was published in 2006, winning the Forward Prize for Best Collection. In 2004, Robertson received the E. M. Forster Award from the American Academy of Arts and Letters. In 2009 he was elected a Fellow of the Royal Society of Literature. He completed the set of Forward Prizes in 2009 when "At Roane Head" won the award for Best Single Poem. This poem is included in his fourth collection, The Wrecking Light (2010), a volume shortlisted for the 2010 Forward Prize, the Costa Poetry Award and the T. S. Eliot Prize. In 2013 he was honourably awarded the international, German Petrarca-Preis, sharing it with Adonis. In 2013, his book Hill of Doors was shortlisted for the Costa Book Award for Poetry. His narrative poem, The Long Take, won the Goldsmiths Prize for innovative fiction. In 2019 it won him the 10th Walter Scott Prize, making him the first Scot and first poet to win the award. It was shortlisted for the 2018 Man Booker Prize. In 2019 he was a contributor to A New Divan: A Lyrical Dialogue Between East and West (Gingko Library).

== Poetry collections ==
- A Painted Field Picador, 1997. ISBN 978-0-330-35059-4; Houghton Mifflin Harcourt, 1999, ISBN 978-0-15-600647-7
- Slow Air, Harcourt, 2002. ISBN 978-0-15-100746-2
- (editor) Mortification: Writers' Stories of Their Public Shame. HarperCollins. 2004. ISBN 978-0-06-075092-3.
- Swithering. Houghton Mifflin Harcourt. 2006. ISBN 978-0-15-603199-8.
- Tomas Tranströmer, The Deleted World Enitharmon Press, 2006. ISBN 978-1-904634-51-5
- Euripides, Medea, Random House, 2008. ISBN 978-1-4070-1399-2
- The Wrecking Light. Picador. 2010. ISBN 978-0-330-51548-1.
- Hill of Doors, Picador, 2013. ISBN 978-1-4472-3154-7
- Sailing the Forest: Selected Poems, Farrar, Straus and Giroux, 2014. ISBN 978-0-374-25534-3
- Euripides, Bacchae, Harper Collins, 2014. ISBN 978-0-0623-1966-1
- The Long Take, Picador, 2018. ISBN 978-1-5098-4688-7
- Grimoire, Picador, 2020. ISBN 978-1529051230
