= Tombland =

2018 novel by C. J. Sansom

- First edition cover
- Author: C. J. Sansom
- Language: English
- Series: Matthew Shardlake Series
- Subject: Crime
- Genre: Historical mystery
- Publisher: Macmillan
- Publication date: 18 October 2018
- Publication place: United Kingdom
- Media type: Hardback
- Pages: 880
- ISBN: 9781447284482
- Preceded by: Lamentation

Tombland is a historical mystery novel by British author C. J. Sansom. It is the seventh book in the Matthew Shardlake series, following 2014's Lamentation. Set in the summer of 1549, the story deals with the investigation of a murder in Norfolk. Matthew Shardlake is entrusted by Princess Elizabeth, later Elizabeth I, to investigate the murder of the wife of a distant relative of hers. During the course of the investigation Shardlake gets involved in Kett's Rebellion.

The title comes from the Tombland area of Norwich which is situated just outside Norwich Cathedral. Tombland's etymology is Danish in origin meaning 'empty space' or 'open land', and in the 11th century the area was home to an Anglo-Scandinavian marketplace.

== Characters ==
Historical characters portrayed in the novel include:

- Princess Elizabeth (the later Queen Elizabeth I)
- Princess Mary (Norfolk Feudary and the later Queen Mary I)
- William Parr, Marquess of Northampton (Lord-lieutenant and the King's step-uncle)
- John Dudley, Earl of Warwick (general and member of the Privy Council)
- Thomas Codd (Mayor of Norwich)
- Augustine Steward (alderman of Norwich)
- Thomas Aldrich (former mayor)
- Matthew Parker (bishop)
- Robert Kett (yeoman and rebel leader)
- William Kett (Robert's brother)
- Richard Southwell (courtier and Princess Mary's steward)
- Sir John Flowerdew (lawyer and landowner)

Fictional characters include:

- Matthew Shardlake
- Nicholas Overton (Shardlake's assistant)
- Jack Barak (Shardlake's former assistant)
- Josephine Brown (Shardlake's former servant)
- Edward Brown (Josephine's husband)
- John Boleyn (murder suspect and distant relative of Princess Elizabeth)

== Reception ==
Critical reception for Tombland has been positive. Stephanie Merritt writing for The Guardian commented that the novel is 'more of a grand historical epic than a tightly packed whodunnit.' In a similar vein Andrew Taylor writing for The Spectator praised the book as 'a Tudor epic disguised as an historical crime novel.'
