= Kai Thomas =

Writer

Kai Thomas is a Canadian writer from Ottawa, Ontario, whose debut novel In the Upper Country was the winner of the 2023 Atwood Gibson Writers' Trust Fiction Prize.

In the Upper Country is a historical fiction about the Underground Railroad, centring on a journalist for an abolitionist newspaper in rural Ontario who is interviewing a woman jailed for killing a bounty hunter who was trying to capture fugitive slaves. It was also a finalist for the 2023 Amazon.ca First Novel Award, the 2023 Governor General's Award for English-language fiction, and the 2024 Walter Scott Prize. It was named one of the 2024 Michigan Notable Books.

Thomas is a fiction writing mentor in the Master of Fine Arts program at the University of King's College in Halifax, Nova Scotia.
