= John Spurling (author) =

Kenyan-English playwright and author (born 1936)

John Antony Spurling (born 17 July 1936) is a Kenyan-English playwright and author who has written thirty-five plays and seven books. Spurling won the 2015 Walter Scott Prize for The Ten Thousand Things. Spurling worked in various other capacities between the 1960s and 1990s, including announcing for BBC Radio from 1963 to 1966, reviewing books and art for BBC Radio and many magazines and newspapers, and as principal art critic for the New Statesman from 1976 to 1988.

== Early life and education ==
On 17 July 1936, Spurling was born in Kisumu, Kenya, to Antony Cuthbert Spurling (1906-1984), QC, resident magistrate and Crown Counsel at Kisumu and Nairobi, later Solicitor-General of Trinidad, and Attorney-General of Gambia and of Sierra Leone, and Elizabeth Frances, daughter of teacher and historian J. C. Stobart. After growing up in Nairobi, where he attended Nairobi Primary School, Spurling left Kenya for England in his tenth year, continuing his education at the Dragon School in Oxford and Marlborough College in Wiltshire, before completing a Bachelor of Arts from St John's College, Oxford, in 1960.

== Career ==
After finishing his secondary education at Marlborough College, Spurling was called up for National Service and commissioned as a second lieutenant in the Royal Artillery from 1955 to 1957. His regiment was stationed in West Germany. Having taken his degree at Oxford, he served as a plebiscite officer in Southern Cameroons from 1960 to 1961. Spurling was a BBC Radio announcer from 1963 to 1966 and reviewed books and radio programs for The Spectator from 1966 to 1970. In 1976, he became art critic for the New Statesman and held the position until 1988.

Spurling began his career as a playwright at the age of twelve when he first encountered Shakespeare's plays at the Dragon School and wrote a farcical piece, performed by his fellow-pupils, about Julius Caesar's invasions of Britain. In 1956 he wrote and directed a Christmas pantomime for his regiment in Germany and in 1958 his Pirandellian comedy Char. was performed by the student ETC (Experimental Theatre Company) at the Oxford Playhouse. Following a Sunday night performance of his play Gerald by professional actors directed by Michael Denison at the Duke of York's Theatre, Spurling was given a two-year grant by a group of West End Managers and wrote MacRune's Guevara, about the recently dead Che Guevara, which was performed in 1969 by the National Theatre and subsequently in many countries around the world. The diverse subjects of his later plays included Ovid, and Chairman Mao and the Aztecs all in one play; the discovery of America; the British Empire; Racine; the Greek philosopher Hypatia, murdered by Christian monks; and an Arabian Nights version of Saddam Hussein. He also wrote plays for television and radio. Spurling published his first novel in 1989 and by 2015 his written works totalled thirty-five plays (a few still unperformed), four novels, two books of literary criticism and a book of Greek myths.

== Awards and honours ==
In 1973, Spurling held the Henfield Writing Fellowship at the University of East Anglia and in 2010 became a Fellow of the Royal Society of Literature. In 2015, Spurling was awarded the Walter Scott Prize for Historical Fiction for his fourth novel, set in fourteenth-century China, The Ten Thousand Things.

== Personal life ==
In 1961 Spurling married writer Susan Hilary Forrest, better known as Hilary Spurling. The Spurlings have three children (Amy, Nathaniel, and Gilbert) and live in London, England.

== Works ==
=== Stage plays (first productions) ===
- MacRune's Guevara, National Theatre, London, 1969, published by Calder & Boyars, 1969
- Romance, (music and lyrics by Charles Ross) Duke of York's Theatre, London, 1971
- In the Heart of the British Museum, Traverse Theatre, Edinburgh, 1971, published by Calder & Boyars, 1972
- Shades of Heathcliff, Lucky's, Sheffield, 1971, published by Marion Boyars, 1975
- Peace in our Time, Crucible Theatre, Sheffield, 1972
- McGonagall and the Murderer, Pool Theatre, Edinburgh, 1974
- On a Clear Day You Can See Marlowe, Cockpit Theatre, London, 1974
- While Rome Burns, Marlowe Theatre, Canterbury, 1976
- Antigone Through the Looking Glass, King's Head, London, 1979
- The British Empire, Part One, Birmingham Repertory Theatre, 1980, published by Marion Boyars, 1982
- Coming Ashore in Guadeloupe, Harrogate Festival, 1982
- Racine at the Girls' School, Cheltenham Literary Festival, 1992
- The Butcher of Baghdad, The Grace at the Latchmere, London, 1993
- Achilles on the Beach at Troy, Bretton Hall, West Yorkshire, 1994
- King Arthur in Avalon, Cheltenham Literary Festival, 1999
- Robinson Crusoe Meets His Maker, HM Prison Albany, Isle of Wight, 2003
- Mutiny in Paradise, HM Prison Kingston, Portsmouth, 2004

=== Television plays ===
- Hope, BBC 2, 1970
- Faith, BBC 2, 1971
- Death of Captain Doughty, Granada, 1973
- Silver, Granada, 1973

=== Radio plays ===
- Where Tigers Roam, BBC Radio 3, 1976
- Dominion over Palm and Pine (The British Empire, part one), BBC Radio 3, 1982
- The Christian Hero (The British Empire, part two), BBC Radio 3, 1982
- The Day of Reckoning (The British Empire, part three), BBC Radio 3, 1985
- Daughters and Sons (six-part dramatisation of I. Compton-Burnett's novel), BBC Radio 4, 1985
- Fancy Pictures: a portrait after Gainsborough, BBC Radio 4, 1988
- Discobolus, BBC Radio 3, 1989
- The Butcher of Baghdad, BBC Radio 3, 1993
- MacRune's Guevara, BBC Radio 3, 1993
- Heresy, BBC Radio 3, 2001
- A Household in Hove, BBC Radio 4, 2002

=== Literary criticism ===
- Beckett: a study of his plays (with John Fletcher), Eyre Methuen, 1972
- Beckett the Playwright (third, revised edition of above), Methuen, 1985
- The Hill Station by J.G.Farrell (his unfinished novel edited with introduction), Weidenfeld & Nicolson, 1981
- Graham Greene, Methuen, 1983

=== Fiction ===
- The Ragged End, Weidenfeld & Nicolson, 1989
- After Zenda, Andre Deutsch, 1995
- A Book of Liszts: Variations on the Theme of Franz Liszt, Seagull, 2011
- The Ten Thousand Things, Overlook/Duckworth, 2014
- Arcadian Nights: Greek Myths Re-imagined, Overlook/Duckworth, 2015
