= Shardlake (TV series) =

British television series

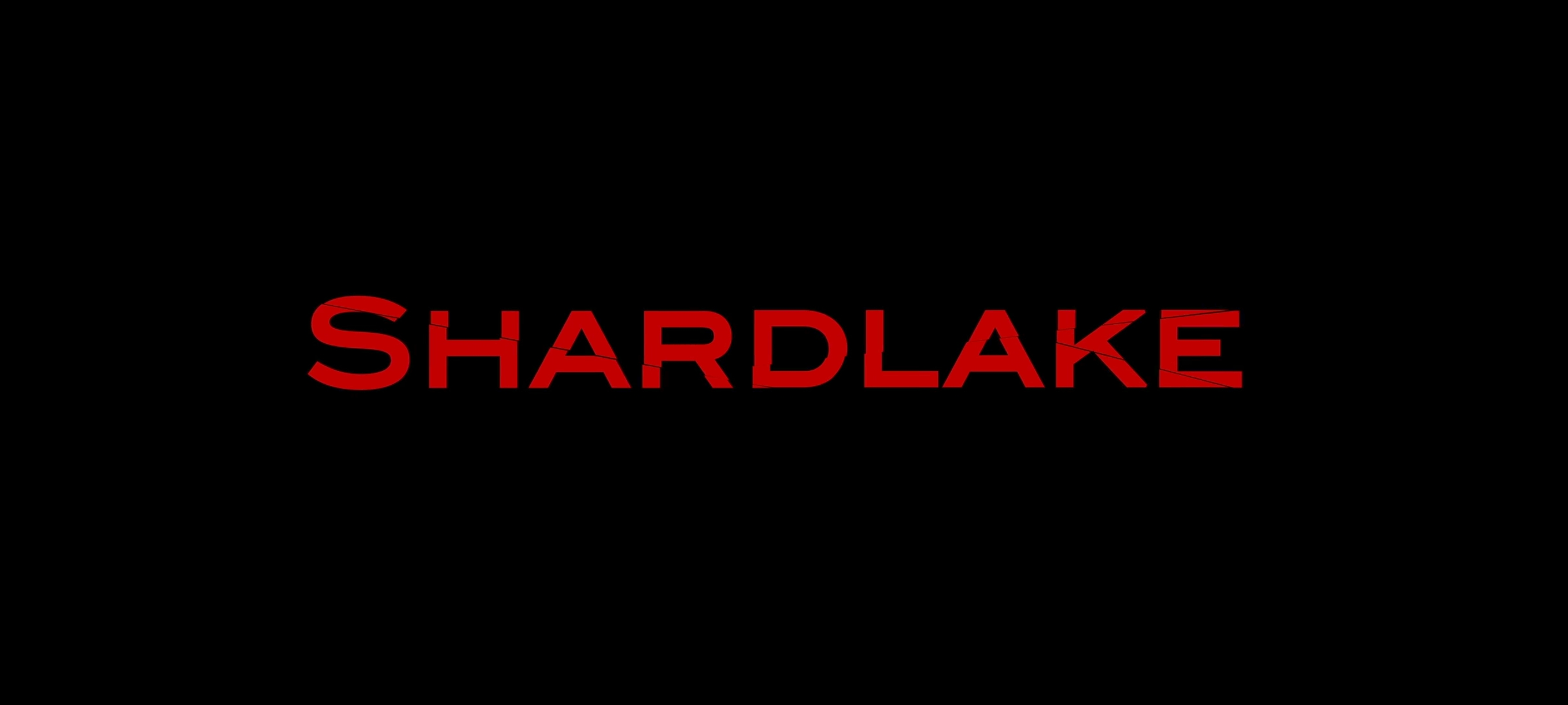
- Genre: Mystery; Crime drama Period drama
- Created by: Stephen Butchard
- Based on: Shardlake series by C. J. Sansom
- Written by: Stephen Butchard
- Directed by: Justin Chadwick
- Starring: Arthur Hughes; Sean Bean
- Country of origin: United Kingdom
- Original language: English
- No. of series: 1
- No. of episodes: 4

Production
- Executive producers: Lee Mason; George Ormond; Mark Pybus; Stevie Lee
- Producer: John Griffin
- Cinematography: Felix Cramer
- Production companies: The Forge; Runaway Fridge

Original release
- Network: Disney+
- Release: 1 May 2024

Shardlake is a four-part television series on Disney+ based on the Shardlake series of historical mystery novels by C. J. Sansom set in the reign of Henry VIII in the 16th century. The series is adapted by Stephen Butchard and directed by Justin Chadwick and produced by The Forge. Arthur Hughes stars as the eponymous Matthew Shardlake, alongside Sean Bean as Thomas Cromwell. C. J. Sansom died on 27 April 2024, just four days before the series premiere. In January 2025, the series was cancelled after one season.

== Synopsis ==
During the dissolution of the monasteries in the Tudor era, the hunchback barrister Master Matthew Shardlake is sent by Thomas Cromwell to investigate the death of a commissioner at a monastery in the remote town of Scarnsea.

== Cast and characters ==
- Arthur Hughes as Matthew Shardlake
  - Toby Eden as young Shardlake
- Anthony Boyle as John "Jack" Barak
- Sean Bean as Thomas Cromwell
- Ruby Ashbourne Serkis as Alice Fewterer
- Joe Barber as Novice Simon Whelplay
- Miles Barrow as Brother Gabriel
- Babou Ceesay as Abbot Fabian
- Peter Firth as Thomas Howard, 3rd Duke of Norfolk
- Paul Kaye as Brother Jerome
- Mike Noble as Master Bugge
- David Pearse as Brother Edwig
- Irfan Shamji as Brother Guy
- Matthew Steer as Dr. Goodhap
- Brian Vernel as Prior Mortimus
- Michael Rivers as Robin Singleton
- Ken Nwosu as Snook
- Hilary Tones as Old Annie
- Kimberley Nixon as Joan
- Alex Lowe as Brother Andrew
- Tadhg Murphy as Copynger
- Alex Bhat as Crowe
- Louis Goodwin as Mark Smeaton
- Charlotte Christof as Orphan Stonegarden
- Roderick Hill as Copper
- Anthony Cozens as Jacob Crump
- Miltos Yerolemou as Oldknoll
- Anthony Aje as Ned Skeels

== Production ==
=== Background ===
Author C.J. Sansom granted the rights to his first Matthew Shardlake novel, Dissolution, to producer Stevie Lee in 2003. Lee initially planned to make a film with Kenneth Branagh. In 2007, the BBC optioned the novels, with Branagh still attached. However, they prioritised their production of Hilary Mantel’s Wolf Hall and Branagh shifted focus to Wallander instead. Later discussions with ITV did not materialise into a production.

In January 2023 it was announced that Disney+ had greenlit an adaptation of the Shardlake novels to be produced by The Forge, part of Banijay. The series consists of four episodes, that are directed by Justin Chadwick from a script written by Stephen Butchard. John Griffin is producing the series, with executive producers George Ormond and Mark Pybus for The Forge, Stevie Lee for Runaway Fridge, and Lee Mason for Disney+.

=== Casting ===
Arthur Hughes was confirmed in the role of Shardlake. Sean Bean was confirmed in the role of Thomas Cromwell. In February 2024 Irfan Shamji, David Pearse, Miles Barrow, Mike Noble and Kimberley Nixon were confirmed in the cast. The cast also includes Babou Ceesay, Paul Kaye, Ruby Ashbourne Serkis, Peter Firth, Matthew Steer, Brian Vernel, and Joe Barber.

=== Filming ===
By March 2023 principal photography had begun with filming locations including Hungary, Romania and Austria. For the monastery, they used Hunedoara Castle, in Transylvania, and Kreuzenstein Castle, outside Vienna.

== Episodes ==
No.	Directed by	Written by	Original release date
1	Justin Chadwick	Stephen Butchard	1 May 2024
2	Justin Chadwick	Stephen Butchard	1 May 2024
3	Justin Chadwick	Stephen Butchard	1 May 2024
4	Justin Chadwick	Stephen Butchard	1 May 2024

== Broadcast ==
The series was available on Disney+ from 1 May 2024. It was broadcast on territorial television in the United Kingdom on ITV1 on 9 June 2025.

== Reception ==
The review aggregator website Rotten Tomatoes reported a 79% approval rating with an average rating of 7.0/10, based on 19 critic reviews. The website's critics consensus reads, "Well acted if a bit unconvincing in its verisimilitude, Shardlake's fast pace keeps it from feeling like a dry tutoring lesson on Tudors intrigue." Metacritic, which uses a weighted average, assigned a score of 70 out of 100 based on 13 critics, indicating "generally favorable reviews".

Anita Singh in The Daily Telegraph called it a "solid, intelligent offering" and that Hughes "imbues Shardlake with a sense of fairness and decency without making him too much of a goody-two-shoes". Joel Golby in The Guardian wrote that "Hughes is superb" and that his "Holmes-Watson dynamic with Boyle's rogueish Jack Barak is very enjoyable". Vicky Jessop in The Evening Standard described it as "a tightly plotted, gorgeously atmospheric piece of television".
