= Adam Foulds =

British novelist and poet

Adam Foulds FRSL
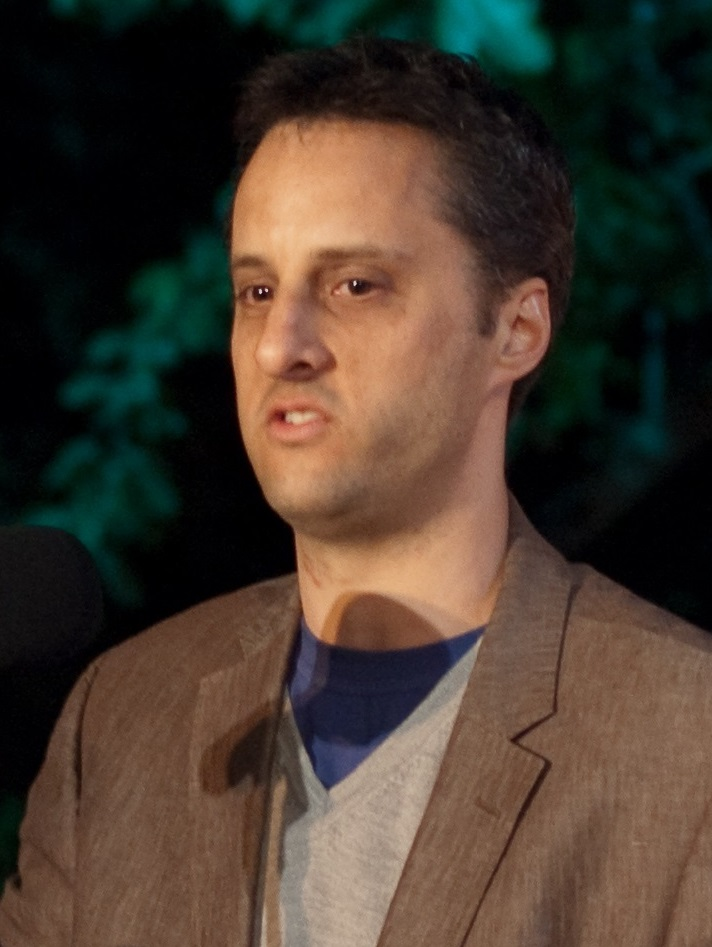
- Foulds at the PalFest 2010 in Palestine
- Born: Adam Samuel James Foulds; 8 October 1974 (age 52); London, United Kingdom
- Education: St Catherine's College, Oxford; University of East Anglia
- Occupations: poet, novelist
- Spouse: Charla Jones
- Writing career
- Language: English
- Years active: 2007–present

Adam Samuel James Foulds FRSL (/ˈfoʊldz/ FOHLDZ; born 8 October 1974) is a British novelist and poet.

== Biography ==
Foulds was educated at Bancroft's School, read English at St Catherine's College, Oxford under Craig Raine, and graduated with an MA in creative writing from the University of East Anglia in 2001.

In 2007, Foulds published his first book, The Truth About These Strange Times. The novel, which is set in the present day, is concerned in part with the World Memory Championships.

In 2008, Foulds published a substantial narrative poem entitled The Broken Word, described by the critic Peter Kemp as a "verse novella". It is a fictional version of some events during the Mau Mau Uprising. Writing in The Guardian, David Wheatley suggested that "The Broken Word is a moving and pitiless depiction of the world as it is rather than as we might like it to be, and the terrible things we do to defend our place in it".

In 2009, his novel The Quickening Maze was published. Recommending the work in a 'books of the year' survey, novelist Julian Barnes declared: 'Having last year greatly admired Adam Foulds's long poem "The Broken Word", I uncharitably wondered whether his novel The Quickening Maze (Cape) might allow me to tacitly advise him to stick to verse. Some hope: this story of the Victorian lunatic asylum where the poet John Clare and Tennyson's brother Septimus were incarcerated is the real thing. It's not a "poetic novel" either, but a novelistic novel, rich in its understanding and representation of the mad, the sane, and that large overlapping category in between'.

On 7 January 2010, he was published on the Guardian's "Over by Over" (OBO) coverage of day five of the Third Test of the South Africa v England series at Newlands, Cape Town. Foulds's published email corrected the OBO writer, Andy Bull, who, in the 77th over, posted lines by Donne in reference to Ian Ronald Bell in verse form: "No doubt I won't be the first pedant to let you know that the Donne you quote is in fact from a prose meditation. The experiment in retrofitting twentieth century free verse technique to it is interesting but the line breaks shouldn't really be there."

In 2013 he was included in the Granta list of 20 best young writers.

He currently lives in Toronto, Ontario, after marrying Canadian photographer Charla Jones.

== Awards and honours ==
Year	Nominated work	Award	Category	Result
2007	The Truth About These Strange Times	Betty Trask Award	—	Won
2007	The Truth About These Strange Times	Sunday Times Young Writer of the Year Award	—	Won
2008	The Broken Word	John Llewellyn Rhys Prize	—	Shortlisted
2008	The Broken Word	Costa Book Awards	Poetry	Won
2009	The Broken Word	Somerset Maugham Award	—	Won
2009	The Broken Word	Sunday Times Young Writer of the Year Award	—	Shortlisted
2009	The Quickening Maze	Booker Prize	—	Shortlisted
2009	The Quickening Maze	Encore Award	—	Won
2010	The Quickening Maze	Walter Scott Prize	—	Shortlisted
2010	Himself	Fellow of the Royal Society of Literature	—	Honored
2011	The Quickening Maze	European Union Prize for Literature	—	Won
2013	—	Granta Best of Young British Novelists (Granta)	—	Won
2015	In the Wolf's Mouth	Walter Scott Prize	—	Shortlisted
2019	Dream Sequence	Giller Prize	—	Longlisted

== Selected bibliography ==
- 2007: The Truth About These Strange Times
- 2008: The Broken Word
- 2009: The Quickening Maze
- 2014: In the Wolf's Mouth
- 2019: Dream Sequence

== See also ==
- List of winners and shortlisted authors of the Booker Prize for Fiction
