= Dissolution (Sansom novel) =

2003 novel by C. J. Sansom

- First Edition cover
- Author: C. J. Sansom
- Language: English
- Series: Matthew Shardlake Series
- Genre: Historical mystery
- Publisher: Viking Books
- Publication date: April 2003
- Publication place: United Kingdom
- Media type: Print (Hardcover)
- Pages: 400 pp (first edition, hardback)
- ISBN: 978-0-670-03203-7 (first edition, hardback)
- OCLC: 52041174
- Dewey Decimal: 823/.92 21
- LC Class: PR6119.A57 D57 2003
- Followed by: Dark Fire

Dissolution (2003) is a historical mystery novel by British author C. J. Sansom. It is Sansom's first published novel, and the first in the Matthew Shardlake Series. It was dramatised by BBC Radio 4 in 2012.

A television series, Shardlake, starring Arthur Hughes in the title role, was released on Disney+ in 2024. Its first season is based on the events of this book.

== Background ==
Set in 1537 during the dissolution of the monasteries, the book follows the lawyer Shardlake in his attempts to solve the murder of one of Thomas Cromwell's commissioners in the monastery at the fictional town of Scarnsea on the south coast of England.

== Reception ==
Dissolution has been well received by critics, although there has been some criticism of the language and detail in the writing. "The best crime novel I have read this year" – Colin Dexter; "Remarkable...the sights, the voices, the very smell of this turbulent age seem to rise from the page" – P. D. James; "This is a humdinger of a whodunnit. Read it!" – Colin Dexter; "This is historical fiction at its finest." – Peter Robinson. The US Library Journal review is more critical, commenting: "His novel is unrelentingly grim in tone, as the reader is forced to plod along with Shardlake and the other mostly unlikable characters."

Dissolution was nominated for the 2003 Crime Writers' Association (CWA) John Creasey Memorial Dagger, for first books by previously unpublished writers. It was also nominated for the CWA Ellis Peters Historical Dagger in the same year.

== Publication history ==
- 2003, USA, Viking Books, ISBN 978-0-670-03203-7, Pub date April 2003, Hardback;
- 2003, UK, Macmillan, ISBN 978-1-4050-0542-5, Pub date June 2003, Hardback;
- 2004, UK, Penguin Books, ISBN 978-0-14-200430-2, Pub date April 2004, Paperback;
- 2004, UK, Pan, ISBN 978-0-330-41196-7, Pub date August 2004, Paperback;
- 2007, UK, Macmillan Digital Audio, ISBN 978-0-230-52911-3, Pub date August 2007, Audiobook.
