= Shardlake series =

Mystery novel series by C. J. Sansom (2003– )

- Dissolution (2003); Dark Fire (2004); Sovereign (2006); Revelation (2008); Heartstone (2010); Lamentation (2014); Tombland (2018)
- Author: C. J. Sansom
- Country: United Kingdom
- Language: English
- Genre: Historical mystery Adventure
- Publisher: Macmillan Publishers
- Published: 2003–present
- Media type: Print (hardcover and paperback), audiobook, e-book

The Shardlake series is a series of historical mystery novels by C. J. Sansom, set in 16th century Tudor England. The series features barrister Matthew Shardlake, who, while navigating the religious reforms of Henry VIII, solves crime and tries to avoid getting caught up in political intrigue. The first six books are set during the reign of Henry VIII, while the seventh, Tombland, takes place two years after the king's demise. Sansom said before his death that he planned to write further Shardlake novels taking the lawyer into the reign of Elizabeth I.

== Description ==
The series' protagonist is the hunchbacked lawyer Matthew Shardlake, who is assisted in his adventures by Mark Poer and then Jack Barak. Shardlake works on commission, initially from Thomas Cromwell in Dissolution and Dark Fire, then archbishop Thomas Cranmer in Sovereign and Revelation, queen Catherine Parr in Heartstone and Lamentation, and then princess Elizabeth in Tombland. The seventh book, Tombland, was published in October 2018.

The books cover several historical events, such as the Dissolution of the monasteries (1536–1541), the Royal Progress to York (1541), the Battle of the Solent and the sinking of the Mary Rose (1545), the burning at the stake of Anne Askew (1546), the publication of The Lamentation of a Sinner (1547), Kett's Rebellion (1549), and the several marriages of king Henry VIII.

== Principal characters ==
=== Fictional ===
- Matthew Shardlake – main character and narrator of the series, a barrister of Lincoln's Inn and later serjeant-at-law. Initially an adherent to the new Anglican faith, and ever a religious thinker, he was once refused as a candidate for the priesthood due to his infirmity.
- Jack Barak – of Jewish descent and formerly Thomas Cromwell's henchman; after Cromwell's execution he comes to work for Shardlake as a law clerk and investigator.
- Stephen Bealknap – Shardlake's nemesis in the law courts of London; also a barrister of Lincoln's Inn.
- Vincent Dyrick – Shardlake's opposing barrister in several cases (Heartstone, Lamentations); of Gray's Inn.
- Dorothy Elliard – wife of Roger Elliard, and once a love interest of Shardlake's.
- Roger Elliard – Shardlake's best friend and fellow lawyer at Lincoln's Inn.
- Ellen Fettiplace – a woman who came originally from a small town in Sussex, she had been living in Bedlam, a lunatic asylum in London, for nearly two decades.
- Brother Guy, later Guy Malton – a Moor turned Christian monk at Scarnsea monastery at Sussex. After the dissolution of the monasteries he came to London to practice as an apothecary, later as a physician; a target for racial discrimination because of his skin colour.
- Nicholas Overton – a gentleman and Shardlake's pupil in chambers.
- Tamasin Reedbourne – a confectioner and junior servant of queen Catherine Howard. After the queen's death Tamasin marries Barak.
- John Skelly – Shardlake's law clerk, a middle-aged family man with poor eyesight.

=== Non-fictional ===
- Henry VIII – King of England 1509–1547, later Defender of the Faith and Head of the Church of England.
- Anne Askew – Protestant preacher, reformist and martyr, burnt at the stake in 1546.
- William Cecil – Barrister of Queen Catherine Parr's Learned Counsel.
- Thomas Cranmer – archbishop of Canterbury 1533–1555, leader of English Reformation.
- Thomas Cromwell – principal counsellor to Henry VIII and holder of a number of high state offices 1533–1540.
- Robert Kett – activist and leader of Kett's Rebellion over the enclosure of lands.
- Catherine Parr – sixth and last wife of Henry VIII, Queen of England 1543–1547. Reformist.
- William Paulet – nobleman and courtier, at one point Master of the Court of Wards.
- Richard Rich – member of the Privy Council, Chancellor of the Court of Augmentations and from 1547, Baron Rich of Leez.

== Novels ==
Matthew Shardlake series
Title	Year set	Year published	Publisher	ISBN	Awards
Dissolution	1537	2003	London:Macmillan	1-4050-0542-4	Nominated for the 2003 Crime Writers' Association (CWA) John Creasey Memorial Dagger, for first books by previously unpublished writers. It was also nominated for the CWA Ellis Peters Historical Dagger in the same year.
Dark Fire	1540	2004	London:Macmillan	1-4050-0544-0	Awarded the Crime Writers' Association Ellis Peters Historical Dagger award in 2005.
Sovereign	1541	2006	London:Macmillan	0-3304-3608-2	
Revelation	1543	2008	London:Macmillan	0-3304-4710-6	Shortlisted for the Books Direct Crime Thriller of the Year 2009 and the Crime Writers' Association Ellis Peters Historical Dagger in 2008.
Heartstone	1545	2010	London:Mantle	1-4050-9273-4	Shortlisted for the 2011 Walter Scott Prize
Lamentation	1546	2014	London:Mantle	978-1-4472-6025-7	
Tombland	1549	2018	London:Mantle	978-1-4472-8449-9	Shortlisted at The British Book Awards 2019 for Fiction Book of the Year and Marketing Strategy of the Year

== Adaptations ==
=== Radio ===
BBC Radio 4 has adapted novels in the Shardlake series as part of its 15-Minute Drama series. In 2012, Dissolution was adapted into a 10-part radio serial by Colin MacDonald, starring Jason Watkins as Shardlake and Mark Bonnar as Cromwell. BBC Radio 4 later broadcast Dark Fire in 2014, with Justin Salinger taking over the role of Shardlake and Bryan Dick playing Barak, Sovereign in 2015, Revelation in 2017, Heartstone in 2018, and Lamentation in 2021, all adapted by Colin MacDonald as 10-part serials and 2-part omnibuses.

=== Television ===
In 2007, the BBC commissioned an adaptation of Dissolution, with Kenneth Branagh set to star as Shardlake. Branagh chose instead to star as the eponymous protagonist in the BBC series Wallander.

In 2023, Disney+ green-lit an adaptation of the Shardlake novels. Released in 2024, the series started with dramatizing the first book Dissolution in four episodes and was directed by Justin Chadwick. Arthur Hughes played Shardlake. In January 2025, the series was cancelled after one season.

=== Stage ===
In 2023, Mike Kenny adapted Sovereign as a community theatre production for the York Theatre Royal. Fergus Rattigan played Shardlake.
