= Winter in Madrid =

2006 novel written by C. J. Sansom

- Author: C. J. Sansom
- Language: English
- Genre: Spy, Thriller, War novel
- Publisher: Pan Macmillan
- Publication date: 6 January 2006
- Publication place: United Kingdom
- Media type: Print (Hardback & Paperback)
- Pages: 511 pp
- ISBN: 978-1-4050-0546-3
- OCLC: 62225677
- Dewey Decimal: 823/.92 22
- LC Class: PR6119.A57 W56 2006

Winter in Madrid is a spy novel written by C. J. Sansom. The setting is the aftermath of the Spanish Civil War in 1940. The main character is a wounded veteran, Harry Brett. He received his wounds during the Dunkirk withdrawal.

The book is purposely set in Madrid, where Francisco Franco resided. The historical setting, Madrid in the Franco era, is well described and almost a "character" according to various reviews. The book contains a historical section at the end to explain what part of the book is based on facts and what is fiction. Critical notes concern the (non-rich) language and a shortage of "thrills" throughout the whole book.

== Plot ==
After his recovery, Dunkirk veteran Harry Brett is recruited by the British Secret Service to make contact with Sandy Forsyth, a shady Madrid-based British businessman and a former school friend. Harry's cover is as an interpreter in the British embassy. He arrives in Spain in October 1940 and finds that the Spanish suffer terribly from political repression, food shortages, poverty and the destruction brought by the Spanish Civil War. Brett works at the embassy for Ambassador Sir Samuel Hoare, an arrogant bully and Alan Hillgarth, the clever cunning chief of intelligence. He meets General Maestre, a contact of the embassy and prominent member of the monarchist faction.

In a twist of fate, Sandy Forsyth's girlfriend, Barbara Clare, is a former lover of another school friend, Bernie Piper, a communist member of the International Brigades missing since the Battle of Jarama in 1937. Harry Brett meets Forsyth, who claims to have found large gold deposits in central Spain. Due to Spain's policy of national self-sufficiency and lack of gold, the mine could be of significant importance to the Franco regime. Meanwhile, Barbara meets Luis, an unemployed Nationalist Spain veteran, who tells her that Bernie is still alive and is being held in a brutal military prison near Cuenca. He tells her that he could organise Bernie's escape through his brother, a guard at the camp, in return for money.

Harry starts a relationship with Sofia Roque Casas, a Spanish working-class woman. He successfully persuades Forsyth to show him the location of the gold mine but almost blows his cover by acknowledging Gomez, a henchman of General Maestre who is working undercover at the mine. Gomez is subsequently captured and killed, damaging the embassy's relations with Maestre. In the fallout of Harry's mistake, Hillgarth decides to attempt to recruit Forsyth. Forsyth, betrayed to learn Harry had been spying on him, reveals that his claims of discovering gold are false and the mine was a sham built to scam investors.

After meeting with the embassy, Sandy appears to have fled Madrid. Barbara reveals to Brett and Sofia her plan to rescue Bernie, and Brett reveals that he has been working as a spy. Bernie escapes the labour camp, and Barbara, Harry and Sofia travel to Cuenca to aid his escape, but it proves to be an elaborate trap set by General Maestre as a means of embarrassing Sandy Forsyth. Sandy appears in Cuenca, revealing that he has become aware of Barbara's plan and plans to sabotage them as vengeance. When Barbara produces a gun, Forsyth once again flees. Although they manage to escape, Sofia is killed by a member of the Guardia Civil and Bernie is shot in the leg by Maestre. They manage to get back to Britain, but Harry is blacklisted by Hoare as punishment for causing a major diplomatic incident.

The epilogue plays in May 1947. Harry Brett is working as a French teacher in a grammar school. Barbara Clare is a translator on her way to meet some Argentine businessmen. Both are nursing private heartache over losing their one true loves, Harry over Sofia and Barbara over Bernie, who died during the 1944 D-Day landings. As a businessman going by the name Barrancas steps off the plane, Barbara immediately recognises him as Sandy Forsyth.
