= Miss Boston and Miss Hargreaves =

2017 novel by Rachel Malik

- First edition
- Author: Rachel Malik
- Language: English
- Genre: Fiction
- Published: Fig Tree, 2017
- Publication place: United Kingdom
- ISBN: 9780241976098

Miss Boston and Miss Hargreaves is Rachel Malik's 2017 debut novel. It is historical fiction set in mid-20th century England.

== Background ==
The novel is loosely based on the life story of the author's grandmother - Miss Hargreaves. Malik had been told that her grandmother died young, and knew nothing of her until well into adulthood. What her mother eventually told her was that Rene Hargreaves did not die, but rather left her husband and three children in Manchester, sometime around the beginning of World War II. She became a Land Girl, and worked for a woman farmer. The two women became close, and continued living together the rest of their lives. Though Malik's mother never saw Rene again, she knew that she had been tried for the murder of her lodger in the early 1960s.

Malik began investigating this woman she never knew of, and was both tantalized and disturbed by what she found. Rene Hargreaves had badly breached the gender rules of her time. She rejected her life as a wife and as a mother, and traded her old life for a much harder existence. Malik was convinced that her life companion Elsie Boston was the key, but reliable information was hard to come by. Notes from the murder investigation and court testimony gave some insight to their life and daily routines, and other personal characteristics, such as manner of speech. As much as she discovered details in her research, Malik felt that she was getting no closer to figuring out "the two Renes" - the one who was a city girl who married and had children, and the one who led a subsistence-level life with another woman, far from sight. That was when she decided to write a novel about her life, and fill in the gaps herself.

== Plot summary ==
One day in 1940 Rene Hargreaves walks out on her family and the city of Manchester, to take a position as a Land Girl at the remote Starlight farm. There she lives and works for farmer Elsie Boston, a sole smallholder in Berkshire, thought of by the locals as irredeemably strange or ‘unked’. Elsie's family is all gone, and she is trying to hold on to the farm herself. At first Elsie and Rene are unsure of one another - strangers from different worlds. But over time they each come to depend on the other.

When Elsie is forced off the farm, the two stay together, becoming itinerant workers on various farms, where their only condition is that they have a private place to live together. Twenty years later, they are living in Cornwall, in a remote cottage. Elsie takes care of the home and grows vegetables, while Rene goes far abroad to find farm work.

Rene learns of the death of Bertha, the only person from her past with whom she remained in touch. She and Elsie take in Bertha’s ageing, alcoholic husband who sets about disrupting their life. When Ernest finally dies it might almost seem a cause for celebration but then the police arrive. Rene is accused of killing him, and stands trial. Elsie, still naive and shy though no longer young, is required to stand on her own for the first time, in a strange city, and she is unable to believe she might lose Rene, who is ultimately convicted.

== Reception ==
The novel was included in the "We Love" section of the Sunday Telegraph's Stella magazine. The Sunday Times review called it "an unflamboyantly effective tale... this is a surprisingly moving account of hidden lives forced out of the shadows." It was a Red, Prima and Good Housekeeping magazines, April selection. It was shortlisted for the Walter Scott Prize, whose judges said it is: "Quietly beautiful and brilliant. This is no bucolic idyll but an unfolding of a plot that constantly twists and turns and surprises. A truly wonderful, memorable novel."

== Awards ==
- 2018 Gladstone’s Library Writers in Residence, winner
- 2018 Walter Scott Prize for Historical Fiction, shortlist
- 2017 Waverton Good Read Award, longlist
