= Sovereign (Sansom novel) =

2006 novel by C J Sansom

- First edition
- Author: C. J. Sansom
- Language: English
- Series: Matthew Shardlake #3
- Genre: Historical mystery, detective fiction
- Set in: Tudor England
- Publisher: Macmillan
- Publication date: 2006 (UK); 2007 (US)
- Publication place: United Kingdom
- Media type: Print (paperback, large print); ebook
- Pages: 582 pp
- ISBN: 9781405088572 (trade paperback ed.)
- OCLC: 67872498
- LC Class: PR6119.A57 S68 2006
- Preceded by: Dark Fire
- Followed by: Revelation

Sovereign, published in 2006, is a historical mystery novel by British author C. J. Sansom. It is Sansom's fourth novel and the third in the Matthew Shardlake Series. Set in the 16th century during the reign of King Henry VIII, it follows hunchbacked lawyer Matthew Shardlake and his assistant, Jack Barak, as they investigate a series of murders and a plot to question the legitimacy of the line of succession to the English throne.

== Plot ==
Set in the autumn of 1541, the novel describes fictional events surrounding Henry VIII's 'Progress' to the North (a state visit accompanied by the royal court and its attendants, the purpose of which was to accept the formal surrender from those who had rebelled during the Pilgrimage of Grace). Most of the novel is set in York though events in London and on the return journey via Hull are also depicted.

Matthew Shardlake (a London lawyer) and his assistant Jack Barak arrive in York ahead of the Progress to fulfill an official role but also with a secret mission from Thomas Cranmer, Archbishop of Canterbury. The official role is to deal with petitions to the king from the citizens of York; the secret mission is to ensure the welfare of an important political prisoner, Sir Edward Broderick, so that he can be brought to London for questioning in the Tower of London. However, events are quickly complicated when the murder of a York glazier leads Shardlake to the discovery of important documents that bring the king's right to the throne into question.

== Characters ==
Historical characters portrayed in the novel include:

- Henry VIII (King of England)
- Catherine Howard (Queen of England; the King's fifth wife)
- Jane, Lady Rochford (the Queen's lady-in-waiting)
- Thomas Cranmer (Archbishop of Canterbury)
- Sir Richard Rich (statesman)
- Thomas Culpeper (courtier)
- Francis Dereham (courtier)
- The late Robert Aske (executed leader of the failed Pilgrimage of Grace)
- The late Cecily Neville (wife of Richard of York and ancestor of the King)
- The late Edward Blaybourne (in the novel, author of a mysterious confession)

Fictional characters include:

- Matthew Shardlake
- Jack Barak (Shardlake's assistant)
- Sir Edward Broderick (a political prisoner)
- Sir William Maleverer (chair of the Council of the North)
- Fulke Radwinter (Broderick's gaoler in York Castle)
- Simon Craike (a lawyer, once Shardlake's fellow student)
- Giles Wrenne (also a lawyer, now advanced in years)
- Jennet Marlin (one of Lady Rochford's attendants)
- Tamasin Reedbourne (a servant of the queen's household)

== Reception ==
In The Independent, Amanda Craig praised the novel, likening the quality of the series to the detective fiction by P. D. James, Ruth Rendell, Ian Rankin and Minette Walters. She praised its "vigorous, well-drawn characters" and "impressive historical research".

Desmond Ryan, a former critic with The Philadelphia Inquirer, also reviewed the novel positively, noting that Sansom succeeded at writing a first-person narrative without awkward historical exposition by the protagonist. He wrote that the three novels in the series "deserve the praise heaped on them in England".

Clea Simon of The Boston Globe wrote that Sovereign was not only longer, but demonstrated greater depth of plot than Sansom's previous novels, calling it an "engaging mix of history and fiction".

The novel was dramatized for radio in a 2015 BBC Radio 4 series. In July 2023, a community theatre performed an adaptation of Sovereign outdoors at King's Manor, York, in a joint production of York Theatre Royal and the University of York.
