= Trapeze (book) =

2012 novel by Simon Mawer

First US edition

The Girl Who Fell from the Sky (as published in the UK by Little, Brown and Company) or Trapeze (as published in the US by Other Press) is a historical novel written by Simon Mawer, published in 2012. It follows a woman during World War II whose ability to speak French and propensity for risk attracts the attention of the Special Operations Executive and eventually leads her to be an agent operating in occupied Europe before she is twenty years old. The American title was changed to avoid confusion with the 2010 novel by Heidi W. Durrow.

In June 2012, Mawer was the guest on a radio broadcast of The Diane Rehm Show, where he talked about his new book.

== Reception ==
The book was reviewed in a number of news sources in the UK (including The Guardian, The Independent and The Telegraph) and USA (including the Washington Post).
