= The Ten Thousand Things (Spurling novel) =

2014 novel by John Spurling

- First edition
- Author: John Spurling
- Language: English
- Set in: China
- Publisher: Duckworth Overlook
- Publication place: United Kingdom
- Media type: Paperback
- Pages: 368
- Awards: Walter Scott Prize (2015)
- ISBN: 978-1468310122

The Ten Thousand Things is a historical novel by author and playwright John Spurling, based on life of 14th-century Chinese artist Wang Meng during the Yuan dynasty. It was published by Duckworth Overlook in 2014 and won the Walter Scott Prize in 2015. Spurling worked on the book for over fifteen years and in the process his work was rejected by 44 publishers.

== Content and publishing ==
The book narrates the life of artist Wang Meng, and life in general of people during the Yuan dynasty. As the Yuan dynasty, founded by Kublai Khan of the Mongol Empire, was the first foreign empire to rule a large part of China, the themes of loyalty and a non-native ruler form major parts of the novel. Spurling describes the dilemmas in the minds of Wang and other artists, including Wang's maternal grandfather Zhao Mengfu, regarding loyalty towards the foreign ruler.

The novel starts with 78-year-old Wang narrating his life story, starting from when he resigned from his post of legal secretary in the Yuan court when he was 36. He leaves for peaceful countryside, observing nature and discussing Tao and Buddhist philosophies. He is now imprisoned by the first emperor of the Ming dynasty. He narrates his own story in the third person, reasoning that he wants to view his life as he "see[s] a tree in a landscape and to look at myself as someone else". A bandit under her pseudonym "White Tigress" approaches him seeking help in avenging her husband's wrongful death by the magistrate. In one incident, all his works in the studio catch fire and his servant dies in it trying to save the works. He helps in the White Tigress' plan in killing the magistrate; but White Tigress dies too. The political landscape of China changes drastically with the Yuan dynasty falling and a peasant-turned-king holding the reins, with whom Wang had interacted long ago in a monastery. Wang Meng is released from the jail and given other bureaucratic positions. The Ming rule brings in changes like regulated education, a system of registering households, prescribed clothes, etc. which find mention in the novel.

The Ten Thousand Things is Spurling's fourth novel and took 15 years to write. It "was rejected by 44 publishers in 14 years", before being finally published by Duckworth Overlook in 2014.

== Review and reception ==
In 2015, the novel won Spurling the Walter Scott Prize, an award given for best historical novel which is set at least 60 years back in history. The award was presented at the Borders Book Festival in Melrose and includes a £25,000 monetary prize. The judges called it "mesmerising, elegantly drawn picture of old imperial China, which feels remarkably modern". In her review for Washington Independent, Alice Stephens calls the book "deceptively simple". Publishers Weekly called it a novel that combines "the delicacy of an old Chinese landscape painting with the brutality of Chinese history". Kirkus Reviews summarizes the novel to be a "work of art in itself" and notes its strength to be "the rich detail that sets the reader in the middle of China".
