= Dominion (Sansom novel) =

Novel by C. J. Sansom

- First edition cover
- Author: C. J. Sansom
- Language: English
- Subject: Political thriller
- Genre: Alternative history
- Publisher: Macmillan
- Publication date: 25 October 2012
- Publication place: United Kingdom
- Media type: Hardback
- Pages: 608
- ISBN: 978-0230744165

Dominion is a 2012 alternative history novel by British author C. J. Sansom. It is a political thriller set in the early 1950s against the backdrop of a Britain that has become a satellite state of Nazi Germany. The point of divergence from actual history is that Lord Halifax, rather than Winston Churchill, succeeded Neville Chamberlain as Prime Minister in May 1940 leading to an armistice with Germany.

== Awards ==
Dominion won the 2013 Sidewise Award for Alternate History, Long Form.

== Controversy ==
Sansom's fictionalised portrayal of some historical figures such as Lord Beaverbrook, Oswald Mosley, Enoch Powell and Marie Stopes as members of a collaborationist puppet government caused some controversy. Allan Massie for The Daily Telegraph, however, defended the portrayal by arguing that "in the make-believe world of counter-factual history, a novelist is entitled to take a different line" and that having a younger version of Powell be as such was "not inherently improbable."

A review in The Guardian conceded that some individuals are depicted in a light that is less than favourable in the fictional work: "Because they are dead, defamation is no legal risk, but there may still be moral jeopardy. Beyond the possible unhappiness of the descendants of Beaverbrook and Enoch Powell at their actions in this book, feminist and Scottish readers respectively may gasp at the suggestion that Marie Stopes is advising the Ministry of Health on eugenic sterilisation and that the Scots Nats have enthusiastically signed up to the Hitler agenda".

== See also ==
- Hypothetical Axis victory in World War II
