= Dark Fire (Sansom novel) =

2004 novel by C. J. Sansom

- First Edition cover
- Author: C. J. Sansom
- Language: English
- Series: Matthew Shardlake Series
- Genre: Historical mystery
- Publisher: Macmillan
- Publication date: 5 November 2004
- Publication place: United Kingdom
- Media type: Print (Hardcover)
- Pages: 384 pp (first edition, hardback)
- ISBN: 978-1-4050-0544-9 (first edition, hardback)
- OCLC: 56646999
- Preceded by: Dissolution
- Followed by: Sovereign

Dark Fire is a historical mystery novel by British author C. J. Sansom. It is Sansom's second novel, released in 2004, and also the second in the Matthew Shardlake Series. Set in the 16th century during the reign of Tudor King Henry VIII, it follows hunchbacked lawyer Shardlake's search to recover the long-lost formula for Greek fire.

The novel was awarded the Crime Writers' Association Ellis Peters Historical Dagger award in 2005.

== Plot introduction ==
It is 1540 and the hottest summer of the sixteenth century. Matthew Shardlake, believing himself out of favour with Thomas Cromwell, is busy trying to maintain his legal practice and keep a discreet profile. But his involvement with a murder case, defending a girl accused of brutally murdering her young cousin, brings him once again into contact with the king's chief minister – and a new assignment ...

The secret of Greek Fire, the legendary substance with which the Byzantines destroyed the Arab navies, has been lost for centuries. Now, an official of the Court of Augmentations has discovered the formula in the library of a dissolved London monastery. When Shardlake is sent to recover it, he finds the official and his alchemist brother brutally murdered – the formula has disappeared.

Now Shardlake must follow the trail of Greek Fire across Tudor London, while trying at the same time to prove his young client's innocence. But very soon he discovers nothing is as it seems ...

== Reception ==
"Dark Fire is a strong and intelligent novel which, while it will certainly please historical crime fans, deserves a wider readership. Sansom appears to have entirely beaten the second novel blues." – Stella Duffy, Guardian Unlimited;
"Historical crime fiction is sometimes little more than a modern adventure in fancy dress. Not so the novels of CJ Sansom, whose magnificent books set in the reign of Henry VIII bring to life the sounds and smells of Tudor England...Dark Fire is a creation of real brilliance, one of those rare pieces of crime fiction that deserves to be hailed as a novel in its own right" – Sunday Times;

== Awards and nominations ==
Dark Fire won the Crime Writers' Association (CWA) Ellis Peters Historical Dagger in 2005, with Sansom receiving the award on October 10, 2005.

== Publication history ==
- 2004, UK, Macmillan, ISBN 978-1-4050-0544-9, Pub date November 2004, Hardback;
- 2004, UK, Macmillan, ISBN 978-1-4050-4163-8, Pub date November 2004, Paperback;
- 2005, USA, Viking Books, 978-0-670-03372-0, Pub date January 2005, Hardback;
- 2005, UK, Pan, ISBN 978-0-330-41197-4, Pub date June 2005, Paperback;
- 2005, UK, Penguin Books, ISBN 978-0-14-303643-2, Pub date December 2005, Paperback;
- 2007, UK, Macmillan Digital Audio, ISBN 978-0-230-52913-7, Pub date September 2007, Audiobook;
- 2007, Brazil, Record, ISBN 978-85-01-07373-0, (Fogo negro).
