= Arthur Hughes (British actor) =

British actor (born 1992)

- Born: 1992 (age 33–34); Aylesbury, Buckinghamshire, England
- Education: Royal Welsh College of Music & Drama
- Occupation: Actor
- Years active: 2012–present

Arthur Hughes (born 1992) is a British actor known for his roles as Ryan McDaniel in the Netflix series The Innocents and Ruairi Donovan in BBC Radio 4 series The Archers. His stage appearances include the role of Laurent in La Cage aux Folles at the Park Theatre, London, Phil in The Solid Life of Sugar Water with Graeae Theatre Company. and the title role in Richard III for the Royal Shakespeare Company.

== Personal life ==
Hughes attended Aylesbury Grammar School, and graduated in 2013 from the Royal Welsh College of Music & Drama. He has radial dysplasia affecting his right arm.

In between acting roles, Hughes has worked as a bartender, a meet and greeter, and a sales and marketing representative.

== Career ==
After starting his career in theatre and radio, Hughes landed his first big television role in 2018 with the Netflix series The Innocents, in the series regular role of Ryan McDaniel.

In 2022, he played disability activist Alan Holdsworth in the BBC's Then Barbara Met Alan; The Independent's reviewer said that "Hughes is excellent as the emotionally unstable and tense Holdsworth". In the same year, he took the title role in the Royal Shakespeare Company's production of Richard III, being the first disabled actor to do so. The Guardian's reviewer said that "Hughes's Richard is every bit the schemer, dead-eyed and unmoved by the body count he leaves on the way to the throne, but he also has a smarmy mischief about him, delivering news of another dispatched victim in a breezy tone of voice and eking comic asides out of his character's darkness." Other stage credits have included Our Town, One Flew Over the Cuckoo's Nest, Julius Caesar, Saint Joan and Romeo and Juliet.

Hughes plays the title character in the Disney+ period drama Shardlake, which was released on 1 May 2024.

Screen International named Hughes as one of its 2023 "Stars of Tomorrow".

== Filmography ==
=== Theatre ===
Year	Title	Role	Notes
	Tracy	Tom	White Bear Theatre
2015	Alix in Wundergarten	Toby Grey	The Other Room
2016	Romeo and Juliet	Mercutio/Lady Capulet	Taking Flight
2016	The Solid Life of Sugar Water	Phil	Graeae Theatre Company
2016–2017	Saint Joan	Ladvenu/The Page	Donmar Warehouse
2017	Julius Caesar	Lucius	Sheffield Theatres
2018	One Flew Over the Cuckoo's Nest	Billy Bibbit	Sheffield Theatres
2019	Our Town	George Gibbs	Regent's Park Open Air Theatre
2019	Vassa	Pavel	Almeida Theatre
2020	La Cage aux Folles	Laurent	Park Theatre
2022	Wars of the Roses	Richard, Duke of Gloucester	Royal Shakespeare Company
2022	Richard III	Richard III	Royal Shakespeare Company
2026	Summerfolk	Pyotr Soslov	National Theatre

=== Film ===
Year	Title	Role	Notes
2017	Saint Joan	Ladvenu / The Page	Filmed recording of the Donmar Warehouse stage production, streamed in cinemas
2018	Frank Blue	Arresting Detective 2	
2022	Richard III	Richard III	Filmed recording of the RSC stage production, streamed in cinemas

=== Television ===
Year	Title	Role	Notes
2012	Doctors	Danny Hooper	Episode: "Survivors"
2014	Ordeal by Innocence	Jacko	3 episodes
2018	The Innocents	Ryan McDaniel	7 episodes
2021	Help	Tim	Television film
2021	On the Edge	Mark	Episode: "Mincemeat"
2022	Shakespeare & Hathaway: Private Investigators	Dean Parolles	Episode: "If It Be Man's Work"
2022	Then Barbara Met Alan	Alan Holdsworth	Television film
2024	Shardlake	Matthew Shardlake	4 episodes
2024	The Jetty	Liam Ashby	2 episodes
2026	Gone	DI Ivan Pemberley	6 episodes

=== Audio ===
Year	Title	Role	Notes
2014	Ordeal by Innocence	Jacko/Constable	BBC Radio, 2 episodes
2014	Andy Warhol's Wig	Interviewer	BBC Radio Drama on 4
2014	The Real Trial of Oscar Wilde	Robbie Ross	BBC Radio Saturday Drama
2014–2015	Home Front	Archie Tulliver	BBC Radio
2018–present	The Archers	Ruairi Donovan	BBC Radio
