= Simon Mawer =

British author (1948–2025)

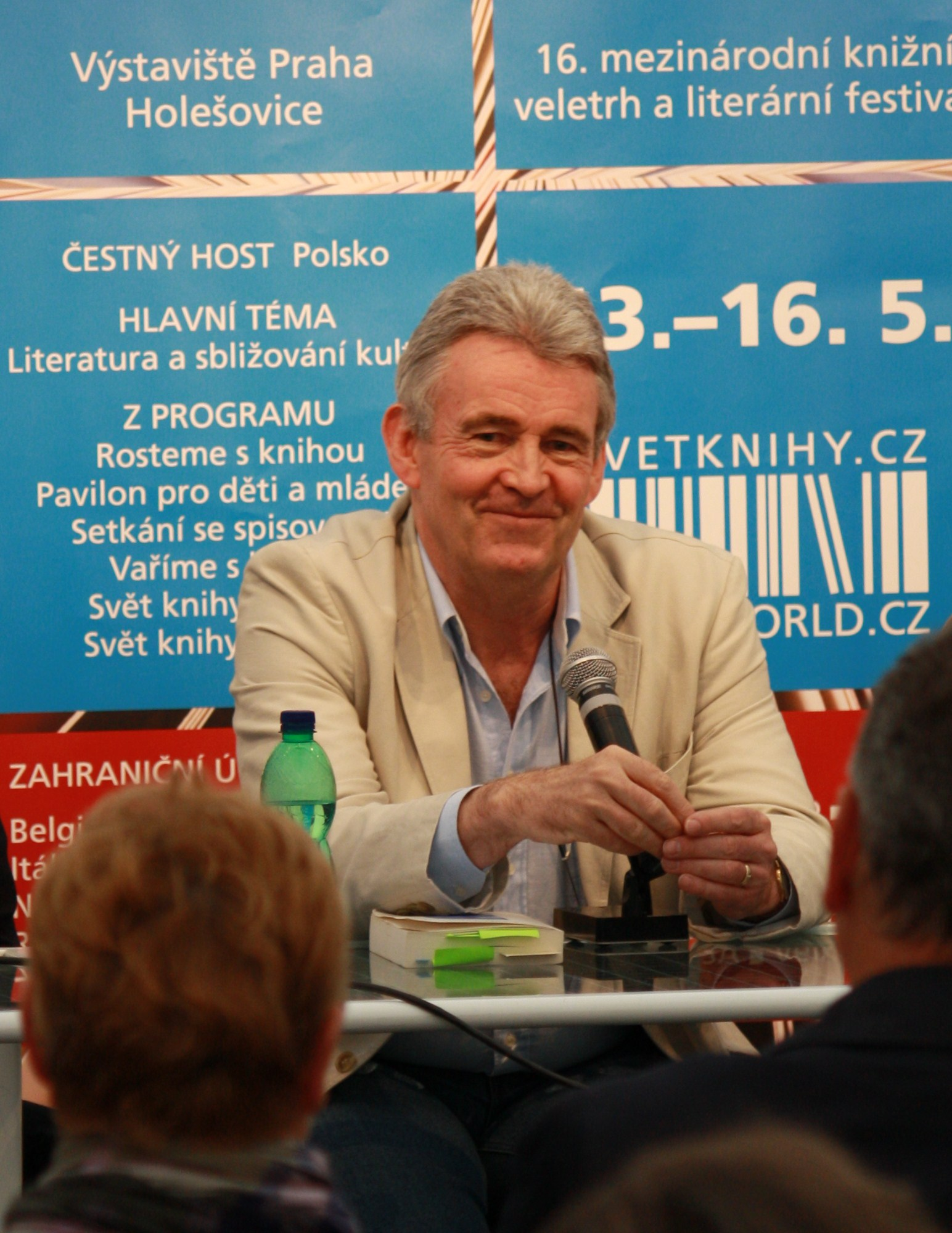
Simon Mawer at Book World 2010

Simon Mawer (/mɔːr/ MOR; 18 September 1948 – 12 February 2025) was a British author who lived in Italy.

== Early life and work ==
Born in England and educated at Millfield School in Somerset and at Brasenose College, Oxford, Mawer took a degree in zoology and worked as a biology teacher for most of his life. He published his first novel, Chimera, (Hamish Hamilton, 1989) at the comparatively late age of forty-one. It won the McKitterick Prize for a first novel by an author over the age of forty. Mendel's Dwarf (1997) followed three works of modest success and established him as a writer of note on both sides of the Atlantic. The New York Times described it as a "thematically ambitious and witty novel". Uzo optioned film rights, and then later Barbra Streisand optioned them.

The novels The Gospel of Judas (2000) and The Fall (2003) came next, followed by Swimming to Ithaca (2006), a novel partially inspired by his childhood on the island of Cyprus. He then published another non-fiction book, Gregor Mendel: Planting the Seeds of Genetics (2006), published in conjunction with the Field Museum of Chicago as a companion volume to the museum's concurrent exhibition of the same name.

In 2009 he published The Glass Room, a novel about a modernist villa Tugendhat built in a Czech city. His 2012 book The Girl Who Fell from the Sky (Trapeze in the US) was received positively on both sides of the Atlantic, described as "a professionally crafted and engaging story" and a "skillfully and intelligently executed thriller". In 2015 he published Tightrope, a follow-on to The Girl Who Fell from the Sky. Tightrope has been described as "...skillful and evocative examination of a mind under stress. Most recently, he wrote Prague Spring (2018) about Brits living in and travelling through Czechoslovakia during both the Prague Spring and subsequent Warsaw Pact invasion.

== Personal life and death ==
Mawer lived in Rome from 1977, teaching biology at St. George's British International School in Rome. He was married with two children. Mawer died on 12 February 2025, at the age of 76.

== Bibliography ==
- Chimera (1989)
- A Place in Italy (1992) (Nonfiction)
- The Bitter Cross (1992)
- A Jealous God (1996)
- Mendel's Dwarf (1997)
- The Gospel of Judas (2000)
- The Fall (2003)
- Swimming to Ithaca (2006)
- Gregor Mendel: Planting the Seeds of Genetics (2006) (Nonfiction)
- The Glass Room (2009)
- The Girl Who Fell from the Sky, published in the United States by Other Press as Trapeze (2012)
- Tightrope (2015)
- Prague Spring (2018)
- Ancestry (2022)

== Awards and honours ==
- 1990 McKitterick Prize for first novels, Chimera
- 2003 Boardman Tasker Prize for Mountain Literature, The Fall
- 2003 Man Booker Prize, longlist, The Fall
- 2009 Man Booker Prize, shortlist, The Glass Room
- 2010 Walter Scott Prize, shortlist, The Glass Room
- 2016 Walter Scott Prize, winner, Tightrope
