= Heartstone (novel) =

2010 novel by C. J. Sansom

- First edition cover
- Author: C. J. Sansom
- Language: English
- Series: Matthew Shardlake Series
- Subject: Crime
- Genre: Historical mystery
- Publisher: Macmillan
- Publication date: 2 September 2010
- Publication place: United Kingdom
- Media type: Hardback
- Pages: 633
- ISBN: 978-1405092739
- Preceded by: Revelation
- Followed by: Lamentation

Heartstone is a historical mystery novel by British author C. J. Sansom. It is Sansom's sixth novel, and the fifth in the Matthew Shardlake Series.

== Plot ==
Set in the 16th century during the reign of King Henry VIII, the events of the novel take place in the summer of 1545. Shardlake and his assistant Barak travel to Portsmouth on a legal case given to them by an old servant of Queen Catherine Parr. The book also concerns preparations for the Battle of the Solent and the King's warship, the Mary Rose.

The book introduces the young Princess Elizabeth in a minor role.

== Audiobook ==
An abridged audiobook on CD, narrated by Anton Lesser, was released by Macmillan Digital Audio in 2010. An unabridged audiobook, nearly 23 hours of narration performed by Steven Crossley, was released in 2011.

== Radio adaptation ==
In 2018, BBC Radio 4 aired a full-cast adaptation of the novel, dramatised by Colin MacDonald, with Justin Salinger starring as Shardlake.

== Awards and honors ==
- 2011 Walter Scott Prize, shortlist
