= Revelation (Sansom novel) =

2008 novel by C. J. Sansom

- First edition cover
- Author: C. J. Sansom
- Language: English
- Series: Matthew Shardlake Series
- Subject: Crime
- Genre: Historical mystery
- Publisher: Macmillan
- Publication date: 4 April 2008
- Publication place: United Kingdom
- Media type: Hardback
- Pages: 452
- ISBN: 1-4050-9272-6
- Preceded by: Sovereign
- Followed by: Heartstone

Revelation is a historical mystery novel by British author C. J. Sansom. It is Sansom's fifth novel, and the fourth in the Matthew Shardlake Series. Set in 1543 during the reign of King Henry VIII, it follows hunchbacked lawyer Shardlake and his assistant, Jack Barak as they hunt the killer of a fellow lawyer - who turns out to be a religiously fanatic serial killer, insane but highly intelligent and capable.

== Plot ==
The plot centres around the challenges of Reformation England, draws on the prophesies of the Book of Revelation and features Archbishop Cranmer.

== Awards and nominations ==
Revelation was short listed for the Books Direct Crime Thriller of the Year 2009 and the Crime Writers' Association Ellis Peters Historical Dagger in 2008.
