= The Glass Room =

Novel by British author Simon Mawer

- Author: Simon Mawer
- Genre: Novel
- Publisher: Other Press
- Publication date: 2009
- Pages: 406
- ISBN: 978-1590513965

The Glass Room, by British author Simon Mawer, was published in 2009 by Other Press in the United States and Little Brown in the United Kingdom. It was shortlisted for the Man Booker Prize in 2009.

== Summary ==
The Landauers, a recently married couple, commission German architect Rainer von Abt to build a modern house in Brno (Czechoslovakia). The Landauer House, based on the Villa Tugendhat, becomes a minimalist masterpiece, with a transparent glass room as its center. World War II arrives, and they must flee the country, with their happiness and idealism in tatters. As the Landauers struggle abroad, their home passes through several new owners, with each new inhabitant falling under the spell of the glass room.

While clearly a fiction, the book does mix fictive characters with some real historical figures, among them Czech composer Vítězslava Kaprálová.

== Reception ==
In September 2009 The Glass Room was one of six novels shortlisted for the Man Booker Prize. It was named a best book of 2009 by The Economist, The Daily Telegraph, Financial Times, London Evening Standard, The Observer, and Slate.com. It was favourably reviewed by The Washington Post.

The daughter of the former owners of villa Tugendhat Daniela Hammer-Tugendhat says that she and the whole family disapproves of the book:"For me, it is another theft. First, the Nazis took our house and now Mawer took our story. That novel isn't about our family, it is against our family. It makes me terribly angry." She also adds that despite Mawer claims that the book is not about the family Tugendhat, things will get mixed up and at the end everybody will believe that this is the true story of the house and the family:"Why did he invent such a Mickeymouse-family where he tells incredible lies about my father? Can you imagine somebody writing a book about your parents full of lies? Without ever contacting anybody from the family? ... It is not a good book. The only reason it got famous is because he wrote about the villa Tugendhat. For me, they are parasites that want to get their glory out of the house."
