= C. J. Sansom =

British author of crime fiction (1952–2024)

- Born: 9 December 1952; Edinburgh, Scotland, UK
- Died: 27 April 2024 (aged 71) near Brighton, England, UK
- Occupations: Author, solicitor
- Writing career
- Genres: Historical fiction and crime fiction
- Notable work: Shardlake series
- Notable awards: Sidewise Award
- Website: pages.panmacmillan.com/c-j-sansom

Christopher John Sansom (9 December 1952 – 27 April 2024) was a British writer of historical crime novels, best known for his Matthew Shardlake series. He also wrote the spy novel Winter in Madrid and the alternative history novel Dominion. He won numerous book awards, including the 2005 Ellis Peters Historical Dagger, the Sidewise Award for Alternate History in 2013 and the Cartier Diamond Dagger in 2022. Shardlake, a television series based on Sansom's novel Dissolution, started streaming on Disney+ less than a week after his death.

== Early life ==
Christopher John Sansom was born in Edinburgh on 9 December 1952, the only son of Trevor and Ann Sansom. He attended George Watson's College but left the school with no qualifications. Sansom wrote about the bullying he suffered there. Subsequently he was educated at the University of Birmingham, where he obtained a BA and then a PhD in history. After working in a variety of jobs, he decided to retrain as a solicitor. He practised in Sussex as a lawyer for the disadvantaged, before leaving the legal profession to become a full-time writer. Sansom lived in Sussex.

== Work ==
Sansom came to prominence with the Shardlake series, his historical mystery series set in the reign of Henry VIII in the 16th century. The series' main character is the hunchbacked lawyer Matthew Shardlake, who is assisted in his adventures by Mark Poer, then Jack Barak and also Nicholas Overton. Shardlake works on commission initially from Thomas Cromwell in Dissolution and Dark Fire, then Archbishop Thomas Cranmer in Sovereign and Revelation, Queen Catherine Parr in Heartstone and Lamentation and finally Princess Elizabeth in Tombland. Dark Fire won the 2005 Crime Writers' Association Historical Dagger.

After Dark Fire was published, a Sunday Times review commented: "Historical crime fiction is sometimes little more than a modern adventure in fancy dress. Not so the novels of CJ Sansom, whose magnificent books set in the reign of Henry VIII bring to life the sounds and smells of Tudor England...".

In the novel Tombland (published in 2018), Shardlake works as a lawyer in the service of Henry's younger daughter, Lady Elizabeth, investigating a murder during the time of Kett's Rebellion in Norfolk. According to The Guardian, "Tombland is more of a grand historical epic than a tightly packed whodunnit, like some of the earlier novels; but 800 pages in Shardlake's company will always fly by."

The Shardlake series has been characterized neo-historical because the reader becomes a "privileged flâneur" as the novels raise awareness of "the subversive power of everyday life."

Dissolution was adapted in 10 episodes for BBC Radio 4 in September 2012, and Revelation in March 2017. The author's death occurred less than a week before the television series based on Dissolution was to start streaming on the Disney+ network.

Sansom explained his reasons for making his protagonist an attorney, in an interview with The Guardian.

I thought it made sense for Shardlake to be a lawyer for a number of reasons. First, the law was my profession: I find legal practice endlessly interesting. Second, it existed then and now, so it provides a point of contact for readers. And third, it's democratic: it offers a way into any number of mysteries, and puts Shardlake in the way of an endless variety of characters.

Sansom also said that he planned to write further Shardlake novels taking the lawyer into the reign of Elizabeth I.

Sansom also wrote Winter in Madrid, a thriller set in Spain in 1940 in the aftermath of the Spanish Civil War and Dominion, an alternative history novel set in a Britain following a fictional Axis victory in World War II. About the latter novel, a Guardian review called the premise "an invented mid-20th century Britain that has the intricate detail and delineation of JRR Tolkien's Middle Earth, though thankfully described in better prose."

== Awards ==
Dark Fire won the 2005 Ellis Peters Historical Dagger, awarded by the Crime Writers' Association (CWA). Sansom himself was "Very Highly Commended" in the 2007 CWA Dagger in the Library award, for the Shardlake series. Dominion won the Sidewise Award for Alternate History in 2013. In 2022, Sansom received the Cartier Diamond Dagger from the CWA.

== Political views ==
Sansom was an outspoken opponent of Scottish nationalism. In the afterword to his alternative history novel Dominion (in which the Scottish National Party is portrayed as collaborating with Nazi Germany), he denounced "the empty populist bonhomie of Alex Salmond", and said that the Scottish independence campaign was "creating a new culture of hostility and bitterness on both sides of the Border". Sansom said of the SNP, "A party which is often referred to by its members, as the SNP is, as the National Movement should send a chill down the spine of anyone who remembers what those words have often meant in Europe." Sansom donated £24,000 to the Better Together campaign that opposed independence in the 2014 Scottish independence referendum.

== Death ==
In 2012, he was diagnosed with multiple myeloma (cancer in bone marrow cells). He died from the cancer at a hospice near his home in Brighton on 27 April 2024, at the age of 71.

== Bibliography ==
=== Matthew Shardlake series ===
- Sansom, C.J. (2003). Dissolution (hardback 1st ed.). London: Macmillan. ISBN 9780670032037.
- Sansom, C.J. (2004). Dark Fire (hardcover 1st ed.). London: Macmillan. ISBN 9781405005449.
- Sansom, C.J. (2006). Sovereign. London: Macmillan. ISBN 0-3304-3608-2.
- Sansom, C.J. (2008). Revelation. London: Macmillan. ISBN 978-0-3304-47102.
- Sansom, C.J. (2010). Heartstone. London: Mantle. ISBN 978-1405092739.
- Sansom, C.J. (2014). Lamentation. London: Mantle. ISBN 978-1447260257.
- Sansom, C.J. (2018). Tombland. London: Mantle. ISBN 978-1447284482.

=== Other novels ===
- Sansom, C.J. (2006). Winter in Madrid. London: Macmillan. ISBN 1-4050-0546-7.
- Sansom, C.J. (2012). Dominion. London: Mantle. ISBN 978-0230744165.
