= NthWORD =

American literary magazine

nthWORD Magazine
- nthWORD Magazine Winter 2009
- Editor-in-Chief: Ryan O'Connor
- Categories: Online magazine
- Frequency: Quarterly
- Circulation: 30,000 (email)
- Publisher: Robert Frigault
- First issue: March 2009
- Final issue: December 2010
- Company: nthWORD L.L.C.
- Country: USA
- Based in: Burlington, Vermont
- Language: English
- Website: https://web.archive.org/web/20110119075304/http://www.nthword.com/

nthWORD was an American quarterly online magazine for creative people. The magazine published works of fiction, creative non-fiction, poetry and art by established and emerging writers and artists, and mock ads.

In addition, nthWORD conducted interviews with commercial and independent artists and professionals working in a variety of creative disciplines and maintained nthWORD Shorts, a blog with a focus on creativity. nthWORD Shorts included daily and weekly posts on art, culture and entertainment—including filmmaking, literature, design, publishing, photography, and social media, artist interviews and reviews on theatre, books, film and technology.

Notable contributors included award-winning poet Lyn Lifshin, director Antoine Fuqua, humorist Harmon Leon, best-selling author David Henry Sterry, multidisciplinary artist Michael Holman, advertising executive Mat Zucker of Ogilvy & Mather, filmmaker Liz Canner and RT anchor Abby Martin.

== Staff ==
- Publisher/Co-founder: Robert Frigault
- Editor-in-Chief/Co-founder: Ryan O'Connor
- Associate Editor: Jennifer König
- Associate Editor: Eliza Kane
- Assistant Editor: Nick Johnson

== Interviews ==
=== Film ===
- Producer Kim Waltrip (Expecting Mary), (Issue 3, Fall 2009)
- Director Antoine Fuqua (Brooklyn's Finest), (Issue 6, April 2010)
- Filmmaker Liz Canner (Orgasm Inc.), (Issue 5, February 2010)
- Harold Blank, Theatre Owner and Partner of Vermont International Film Festival (Issue 5, February 2010)
- Screenwriter/Director Michael Holman Basquiat (Issue 8, December 2010)

=== Theatre ===
- Actors Matthew Glassman and Carlos Uriona of Double Edge Theatre (Issue 5, February 2010)
- Virlana Tkacz, Founding Director of Yara Arts Group by Olena Jennings (Issue 6, April 2010)

=== Writing and publishing ===
- Shane Jones of Light Boxes (Issue 8, December 2010)
- Dennis Loy Johnson of Melville House Publishing (Issue 8, December 2010)
- Poet Laureate Charles Simic (nthWORD Shorts, Olena Jennings, April 18, 2011)
- James Scudamore of Booker Prize nominated Heliopolis (nthWORD Shorts, Ryan O'Connor, July 11, 2011)

=== Music ===
- Matthew Clark of White Rabbits (Issue 2, Spring/Summer 2009)
- Thomas Gobena and Ori Kaplan of Gogol Bordello (Issue 7, August 2010)

== Reviews ==
=== Advertising ===
- The World's Greatest Salesperson Contest by Ogilvy & Mather (nthWORD Shorts, March 29, 2010)

=== Books ===
- Zero by Ignacio de Loyola Brandao (nthWORD Shorts, November 2010)
- The Good-Bye Angel by Ignacio de Loyola Brandao (nthWORD Shorts, November 2010)
- Ice Trilogy by Vladimir Sorokin (nthWORD Shorts, July 2010)
- Seven Days in Rio by Francis Levy (Jessica Maybury for nthWORD Shorts, January 2012)
- The Dewey Decimal System by Nathan Larson (Kola Boof for nthWORD Shorts, February 2012)

=== Film ===
- The Squid and the Whale: A Comedic Victory, Not for the Sentimental (nthWORD Shorts, October 27, 2010)

=== Photography ===
- Miss Aniela (Natalie Dybisz) on Flickr & Freedom of Expression (nthWORD Shorts, February 3, 2010)
- Viola Muscinelli on Censorship (nthWORD Shorts, February 8, 2010)
- Jessica Stoker: Beyond Inhibitions (nthWORD Shorts, February 13, 2010)
- Nate Howard On Seeing Haiti, Nate Howard Photographs Haiti (nthWORD Shorts, February 14, 2010)

=== Theatre ===
- The Salvation of Anarchy: Review of The Disappearance by Double Edge Theatre (nthWORD Shorts, April 1, 2010)

=== Festivals ===
- The Flat Lake Festival by Jessica Maybury (nthWORD Shorts, June 9, 2010)

=== Music ===
- The Decemberists Review of The King Is Dead (album) by Seth Katz (nthWORD Shorts, January 27, 2010)
- St. Vincent Review of Strange Mercy by Seth Katz (nthWORD Shorts, September 15, 2011)
- of Montreal Review of Paralytic Stalks by Seth Katz (nthWORD Shorts, February 8, 2012)
