= 2009 Man Booker Prize =

British literary award given in 2009

The 2009 Booker Prize for Fiction was awarded at a ceremony on 6 October 2009. The Man Booker longlist of 13 books was announced on 2 August, and was narrowed down to a shortlist of six on 8 September. The Man Booker Prize was awarded to Hilary Mantel for Wolf Hall.

== Judging panel ==
- James Naughtie (Chair)
- Lucasta Miller
- Michael Prodger
- Professor John Mullan
- Sue Perkins

== Nominees (Shortlist) ==
Author	Title	Genre(s)	Country	Publisher
A. S. Byatt	The Children's Book	Novel	UK	Random House, Chatto and Windus
J. M. Coetzee	Summertime	Novel	South Africa, Australia	Random House, Harvill Secker
Adam Foulds	The Quickening Maze	Novel	UK	Random House, Jonathan Cape
Hilary Mantel	Wolf Hall	Novel	UK	HarperCollins, Fourth Estate
Simon Mawer	The Glass Room	Novel	UK	Little, Brown
Sarah Waters	The Little Stranger	Novel	UK	Little, Brown, Virago

== Nominees (Longlist) ==
Author	Title	Genre(s)	Country	Publisher
A. S. Byatt	The Children's Book	Novel	UK	Random House, Chatto and Windus
William Trevor	Love and Summer	Novel	Ireland	Viking
J. M. Coetzee	Summertime	Novel	South Africa, Australia	Random House, Harvill Secker
James Lever	Me Cheeta	Novel		4th Estate
Adam Foulds	The Quickening Maze	Novel	UK	Random House, Jonathan Cape
Sarah Hall	How to Paint a Dead Man	Novel	UK	Faber
Samantha Harvey	The Wilderness	Novel	UK	Jonathan Cape
James Scudamore	Heliopolis	Novel	UK	Harvill Secker
Hilary Mantel	Wolf Hall	Novel	UK	HarperCollins, Fourth Estate
Colm Tóibín	Brooklyn	Novel	Ireland	Viking
Simon Mawer	The Glass Room	Novel	UK	Little, Brown
Ed O'Loughlin	Not Untrue and Not Unkind	Novel	Ireland, Canada	Penguin
Sarah Waters	The Little Stranger	Novel	UK	Little, Brown, Virago
