= Jan de Boer =

Jan de Boer may refer to:

- Jan de Boer (gymnast) (1859–1941), Dutch gymnast
- Jan de Boer (footballer, born 1898) (1898–1988), Dutch footballer
- Jan de Boer (footballer, born 2000), Dutch footballer
- Jan de Boer (physicist), Dutch physicist
