= Alex Barnett =

Alex Barnett may refer to:

- Alex Barnett (cricketer) (born 1970), English cricketer
- Alex Barnett (mathematician) (born 1972), English applied mathematician and musician
- Alex Barnett (basketball) (born 1986), American basketball player
