= Robert Frigault =

Robert Frigault (born 1971) is a Canadian cyber-activist, publisher/writer and entrepreneur who was active against Bennett Environmental Inc.'s plans to operate a soil incinerator designed to treat soils contaminated with PCBs, PCPs, pesticides and chlorinated organic compounds. In 2004, Frigault created the web portal stopbennett.com to help concerned residents of Northern New Brunswick stop the company from operating its incinerator in Belledune, located in the Baie des Chaleurs region of the province. The portal garnered over 10,000 signatures for a petition that was delivered to Bernard Lord, former Premier of New Brunswick.

Frigault was born in Bathurst, New Brunswick. After spending most of his career as a marketer of both enterprise software and travel products in Toronto, Montreal and Boston, Frigault returned to Bathurst in 2007 to serve as President of NU Exchange, Inc., and to pursue his dream of establishing an edible forest garden based on the pioneering work of Robert Hart in the UK. The edible forest is located at Stonefly Acres, a 100-acre (0.40 km^{2}) private property outside of the city of Bathurst.

In March 2009, Frigault co-founded nthWORD, an online arts & culture magazine.
