= Michael Dillon =

First trans man to undergo phalloplasty (1915–1962)

- Dillon in the Merchant Navy, pictured in the mid-1950s.
- Born: 1 May 1915; Kensington, Middlesex, England
- Died: 15 May 1962 (aged 47); Dalhousie, India
- Other name: Lobzang Jivaka
- Occupations: Doctor; author; Buddhist monk
- Known for: First trans man to undergo phalloplasty

Laurence Michael Dillon (1 May 1915 – 15 May 1962) was a British doctor, author, poet, Buddhist monk and the first known transgender man to undergo a phalloplasty.

A former president of the Oxford University Women's Boat Club, Dillon began living as a man soon after his graduation in 1938. He pioneered female-to-male gender transitioning; he is the first trans man known to have taken testosterone exclusively for this purpose and in 1946 received the world's first phalloplasty from the plastic surgeon Harold Gillies. As a medical student, Dillon performed an orchiectomy on Roberta Cowell, the first British trans woman to receive vaginoplasty. He also wrote the 1946 book Self: A Study in Ethics and Endocrinology, an early text on transgender medicine.

After graduation, Dillon worked as a Merchant Navy doctor. His transition became the subject of public attention when it affected his listing as the heir presumptive for the baronetcy of Lismullen. Dillon, who by then had become interested in Buddhism, resigned from the Merchant Navy and moved to India to devote his life to becoming a Buddhist monk. He changed his name to Lobzang Jivaka, named after the Buddha's own doctor. In 1960, he became the first Westerner to be ordained in the Rizong Monastery in Ladakh. Between 1960–1962, he wrote four books on Buddhism, including Imji Getsul: An English Buddhist in a Tibetan Monastery which recounted his three months at Rizong. He also wrote an autobiography titled Out of the Ordinary: A Life of Gender and Spiritual Transitions, which was completed in 1962 and published posthumously in 2016. Dillon died in May 1962, just two weeks after finishing his autobiography.

== Early life ==
Dillon was born on 1 May 1915 in Ladbroke Gardens, Kensington. Assigned female at birth, he was the second child of Robert Arthur Dillon (1865–1925), a Royal Navy Lieutenant and heir to the baronetcy of Lismullen in Ireland. He was named after his mother, Laura Maude McCliver (née Reese) (Note: The Dictionary of Irish Biography lists the name as Laura Maud MacLiver.) (1888–1915), who died of sepsis when Michael was less than two weeks old. Robert Dillon suffered from alcoholism and left the Navy to avoid being cashiered. He did not take up any subsequent profession and was unable to look after Michael and his older brother Robert 'Bobby' William Charlier Dillon. The two children were sent to be raised by their two paternal aunts in Folkestone, Kent. The children's aunts were strict with money despite their wealth, but still sought to separate themselves from people of lower classes.

Robert Dillon died in 1925, making his son Bobby the immediate heir to the baronetcy of Lismullen. Less than a month later, the baronet—Sir John Fox Dillon—also died, thereby passing the title onto Bobby, who at the time was eleven years old. With the title, Bobby inherited the family estate in County Meath. The estate had been burned down by Sinn Féin in 1922 and only the servants' quarters remained, but the building of a new house was arranged by Robert Dillon's widow. Michael spent his summer holidays at the estate, learning to fish and to shoot, until he was 14 years old.

Dillon was educated at Brampton Down Girls' School in Folkestone. He enjoyed learning about theology and spirituality, a passion he would retain throughout his life. He was brought up in the Church of England and had close relationships with the local vicars who helped him further his philosophical knowledge and practice. Dillon also enjoyed sports and masculine-oriented activities and wished to present himself in a more masculine way, such as asking for his hair to be cut in the same style as his brother's. Later in his life, he claimed that as a child and teenager he never thought of himself as a girl. He envied his brother for being able to attend an all-boys' school and did not like being excluded from boys' games and activities. He recalled an incident from his teenage years when a boy held open a gate for him and he realised for the first time that others perceived him as a woman, which jarred with how he felt internally. Dillon felt physically uncomfortable as a girl, recalling that he had tried to bind his breasts with a belt until a classmate found out and warned that it was dangerous.

== Education at Oxford ==
Dillon was encouraged by one of the local vicars to study theology at Oxford. In 1934, he enrolled in the Society of Oxford Home Students (now St Anne's College, Oxford). Dillon initially had ambitions of becoming a Deaconess post-graduation, but convinced the university that he should switch to Greats (also known as Classics) and secured further tutoring in the subject during the holidays.

Dillon struggled socially at university, but discovered a passion for rowing. He became the president of the Oxford University Women's Boat Club and fought for greater recognition of the women's sport, seeking to increase the parity between men's and women's rowing. At the time, women's rowing involved rowing downstream, unlike the men, and women wore clothing unsuitable for more strenuous action. The women's teams also did not race against each other but were timed individually.

Dillon successfully campaigned to change these practices so that women's rowing aligned more with the men's sport. As captain, he achieved blues—an award of sporting colours granted to athletes in Oxford University—in both 1935 and 1936. The rowing team went on tour to Amsterdam and Frankfurt in 1938. His advancement of the women's sport gained him press attention; his photo was featured in a Daily Mail article in November 1937 with the caption "How unlike a woman!".

Whilst at Oxford, Dillon continued to question his gender identity. Although he wondered whether he may be a lesbian, he continued to feel as if he were not a woman. This led him to present more masculine; he began smoking a pipe, riding a motorcycle and donned an Eton crop. He confided in a close male friend who helped him buy men's clothing and took him to boxing matches where women were not permitted.

Despite the difficulties of having to live as a woman whilst not feeling like one, there is evidence to suggest that Dillon remembered his time at Oxford fondly, later describing himself as an "Oxford man". He graduated in 1938 with a third—the lowest honours classification.

== Bristol and initial gender transition ==
After graduation from Oxford, Dillon began working as a laboratory assistant in Stapleton, Bristol. The work, which involved dissection of brains, fostered his growing interest in the connection between the mind and the body. He volunteered for the Women's Auxiliary Air Force territorials when World War II began in 1939, but was told by the commandant that he did not seem to be suited to the work and was put off by the discovery that he would have to live in dormitories exclusively with women. He therefore returned to laboratory work.

At this time, Dillon heard about the work of Doctor George Foss who was experimenting with the recently synthesised hormone testosterone; initially intended to ease severe menstrual symptoms, the drug caused the female patients to experience masculinising side effects. Dillon approached Foss and asked to be prescribed the hormone for personal use. Foss was willing to help Dillon on the condition that he spoke to a psychiatrist first.

After this condition was fulfilled, Foss began to worry that he would be called up to fight in World War II and thus leave Dillon's treatment unfinished, so he provided Dillon with testosterone pills to try out on himself. Dillon therefore became the first recorded person to take testosterone exclusively for the purpose of gender affirmation.

Although Dillon had only confided in Foss and the psychiatrist about his desire to become a man, the psychiatrist betrayed his trust and told another doctor at Dillon's laboratory. Dillon felt forced to leave his job after more colleagues found out.

After leaving the laboratory, Dillon began volunteering for the First Aid Nursing Yeomanry, but left following a motorbike injury. Dillon moved from the outskirts of the city of Bristol into the centre. His desire to be a man and uncertainty on what profession to pursue restricted his job opportunities, and he ultimately found employment as a petrol pump attendant at a garage called College Motors.

Whilst at the garage, Dillon continued to self-administer testosterone. He faced frequent taunting from his colleagues who would inform customers about how Dillon was a woman who wanted to be a man. Over the four years he spent at the garage, Dillon's physical transition became more apparent and he was able to present more confidently as male. Eventually, his gender was accommodated by the garage staff and customers would immediately assume he was male.

It was whilst working at the garage that Dillon started using the name Michael. He volunteered to become the garage's firewatcher during heavy bombing of Bristol during the Second World War. Whilst working as a firewatcher, Dillon wrote his first book Self: A Study in Ethics and Endocrinology. Written from the perspective of a neutral third party, the book argues for greater empathy for patients who wish to change their sex and advocates for a patient-informed basis of treatment. The book does not reveal Dillon's own personal interest in the matter. It was later published in 1946. Despite the growing acceptance of his gender, Dillon later recounted that he did not enjoy his time at the garage, describing it as "The Darkest of Days".

Dillon suffered from hypoglycaemia and would sometimes end up in hospital after passing out. During one admission to Bristol Royal Infirmary in 1942, he received a double mastectomy from a sympathetic plastic surgeon. The surgeon encouraged Dillon to legally change his name and sex, and informed him of the work of renowned surgeon Sir Harold Gillies. Gillies was a surgeon who had become well-known partly for his pioneering surgeries on intersex patients and injured soldiers, some of which included reconstructing penises. Dillon contacted Gillies that same year, asking whether he could undergo a similar treatment.

Dillon officially changed his name to Laurence Michael Dillon in 1944. He was able to change his birth certificate with a medical certificate authorised by a doctor and his cousin as a family member. (Note: Dillon secured a signature from his cousin Maude Eileen Beauchamp, believing her to be more liberal and accepting than his brother or aunts.)

== Trinity College and surgeries ==
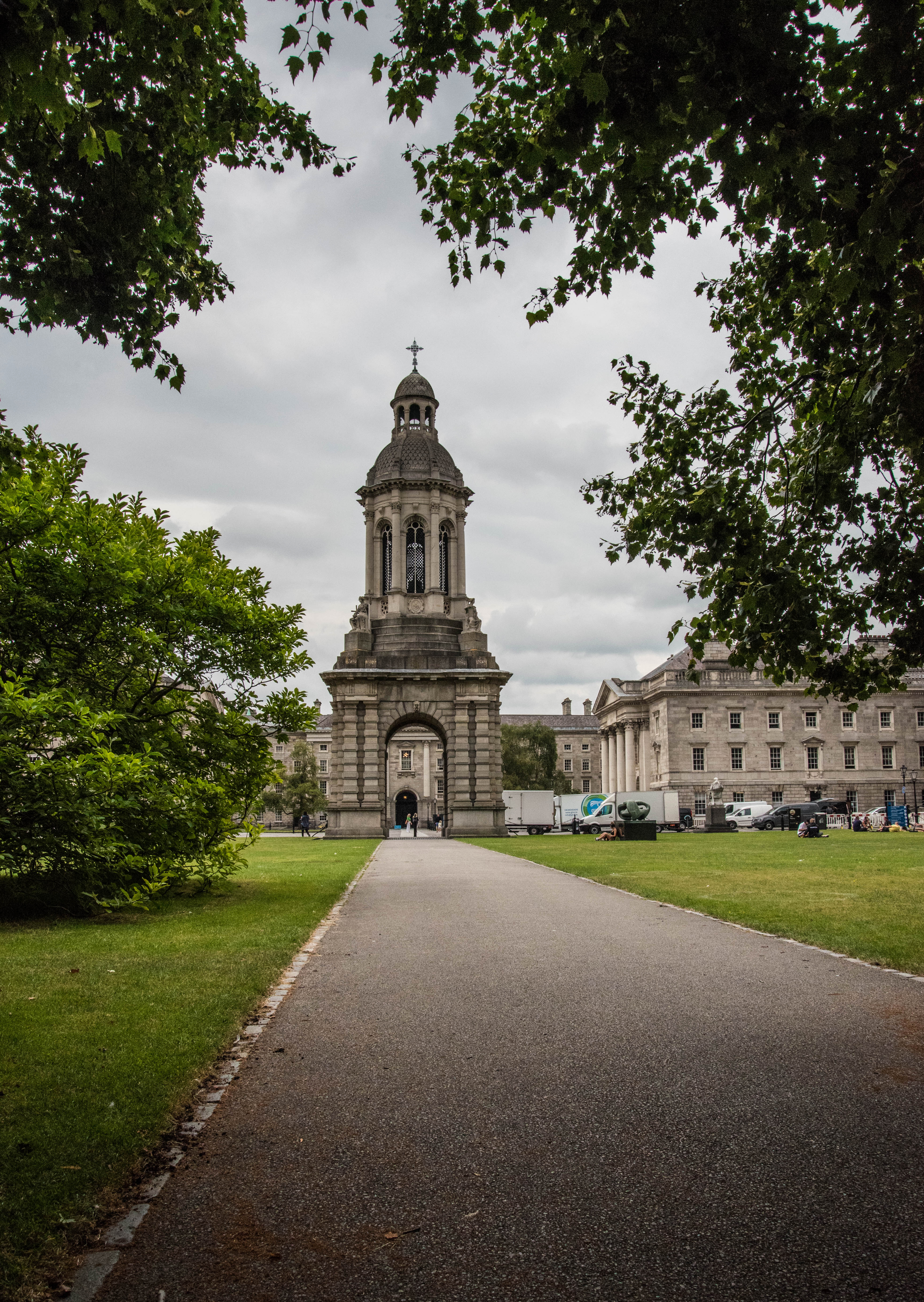
Trinity College Dublin pictured in 2021.

Dillon's research on hormones and sexuality, and his correspondence with Gillies, had fostered an interest in medicine. In 1945, after completing initial training at Bristol's Merchant Venturer's Technical College, he enrolled in the Medical School of Trinity College Dublin. Dillon was able to enrol under his new name thanks to assistance from a former Oxford tutor, who helped Dillon change the university records to show that he had studied at Brasenose College, which only accepted male students at the time.

Gillies was willing to perform a phalloplasty on Dillon, but only after World War II had concluded. At the time, the standard medical view of gender-affirming surgery was that it amounted to a mutilation of a healthy body. Gillies, however, believed that performing such surgeries was necessary and morally correct if it brought happiness to the patient. Dillon shared this belief, believing that patients should have the agency to decide if the "mutilation" would end their psychological distress. Because operations to change gender were deemed controversial, Gillies falsified Dillon's condition in order to be able to perform surgery without scrutiny, diagnosing Dillon with acute hypospadias. (Note: Penny Lewis writes that false diagnoses of hypospadias were relatively widespread at the time among doctors treating transgender patients.) From 1946, during his holidays from medical school, Dillon travelled to visit Gillies at Rooksdown House in Basingstoke for a series of surgeries. The phalloplasty surgery involved using flaps of skin from Dillon's legs and stomach to form a penis. The surgeries led to infections and difficulty walking, which Dillon would falsely claim were wounds suffered during the bombing raids of Bristol. Gillies made an effort to foster a positive atmosphere at Rooksdown and Dillon enjoyed his time there, twice acting as master of ceremonies for the Christmas parties and in general feeling as if he were finally becoming wholly male.

At Trinity, Dillon again became a distinguished rower, this time for the men's team. He achieved a blue. Dillon was reported to be misogynistic and was careful to avoid romantic advances with women, later saying that he felt it was unfair to court women if he was not able to have children with them. He felt great comfort, however, in knowing that he could be in public and automatically perceived as a male by passers-by. His aunts grew to accept him as a male and eventually Dillon felt comfortable visiting them back in Folkestone. His brother, however, never accepted Dillon, and forbade him from ever revealing his relation to the baronetcy.

=== Roberta Cowell ===
Dillon's book Self (published 1946) brought him to the attention of Roberta Cowell, a racecar driver who wished to transition from male to female. They corresponded and first met in London in 1950 during Dillon's time studying at Trinity. Cowell had been taking estrogen but was unable to be recognised officially as female. Dillon, who was not yet qualified as a doctor, performed an illegal orchiectomy on Cowell with her permission. This surgery allowed her to receive further gender reassignment surgery from Harold Gillies and register as a woman in 1951. As Dillon and Cowell got to know each other better, Dillon assumed they were in a relationship. He wrote love letters to Cowell revealing his infatuation with her. There were indications that Cowell was not interested; Dillon, for instance, assumed that Cowell would assume a traditional feminine submissive housewife role after they were married, at which she expressed dissatisfaction. She recalled that Dillon made patronising remarks about her lack of education and had a limited sense of humour. Furthermore, author Mary Roach suggests that Cowell thought it was necessary to maintain the pretence of their relationship in order for her to receive on orchiectomy. Cowell later recalled that she was not comfortable with the idea of them being together on account of Dillon's own transition (delegitimising it and misgendering him), saying "as far as I was concerned, it would have been two females getting married, and I was certainly not interested in him in that kind of way." Dillon proposed to Cowell in 1951 after graduating and made plans for a wedding, but he was turned down. Cowell wrote, "[A]lthough I liked and respected him very much as a person, there was no possible way I could ever think of marrying him."

== Medical career and Merchant Navy ==
Dillon graduated from Trinity in 1951 and began working as a physician in a north Dublin hospital. Dillon was inspired by the holistic care he had received at Rooksdown House and decided to implement some of the elements in his own workplace: these included taking the patients on picnic trips, installing a library, providing patients with personal radios, practicing occupational therapy, and engaging the patients in crafts. He started donating 10 percent of his income to a grant scheme facilitated by Arthur Millbourne, Canon of Bristol Cathedral, which helped disadvantaged students pay for university.

In 1952, he started working as a doctor for the Merchant Navy and worked at sea until 1958. Throughout his career he took contracts for P&O, British India Steam Navigation Company and the China Navigation Company. Editors of Dillon's posthumous autobiography, Jacob Lau and Cameron Partridge, write that whilst recalling his experiences in the Navy, Dillon revealed some of his entrenched imperialist and xenophobic views. However, he also wrote about his experiences of seeing racial integration at The Mission to Seafarers and feeling the injustice of exploitation of people in India. Dillon also tried to escape his prior conditioning by reading widely, including the works of George Gurdjieff, Peter Ouspensky, and Tuesday Lobsang Rampa. Dillon discovered that Rampa, author of The Third Eye, lived in Dublin and decided to visit him for a fortnight in 1957 to seek mentorship in Buddhism. Although Rampa was later discovered to be a fraud, Dillon still claimed that he had learned a lot from him. Dillon was inspired by Rampa to spend time in India and pursue the religion further.

When not working onboard ships, Dillon found other medical work; in 1957 he started working at an NHS hospital in the Port of London, then moved back to Oxford to work in the laboratory of George de la Warr, eventually being dismissed due to his uncertain financial situation and his scepticism of the laboratory's scientific rigour. In early 1958, Dillon was back at sea and his ship stopped in Calcutta. He used this as an opportunity to learn more about Buddhism. He travelled to Bodh Gaya to visit the Mahabodhi Temple, where he met Dhardoh Rimpoche. Although Dillon was not initially interested in converting to Buddhism, he started to feel at home in the culture. Rimpoche urged Dillon to visit Kalimpong the next time he came to India.

=== Outing in the press ===
Since he joined the Merchant Navy, Dillon was living fully as a man and had not had to explain his gender transition to any new acquaintances. In 1953, he decided to request to change his name in the Debrett's and Burke's Peerage genealogical guides, which still listed his old name and sex in the Dillon baronetcy lineage. Dillon, now officially listed as the brother of the Baronet Lismullen rather than the sister, became the immediate heir to the baronetcy. In May 1958, news of Dillon's past life as a woman was uncovered in the press. A discrepancy had been discovered between the two peerage books: Debrett's had recorded Dillon's current name, but his old name and sex were still included in the Burke's. Dillon's ship had docked at Baltimore when he received a cable from the Daily Express, asking whether he intended to claim his aristocratic title since his "change-over". (Note: The full text of the cable was "Do you intend to claim the title since your change-over? Kindly cable Daily Express.) The news reports which followed revealed the story of Dillon's transition, which he had kept secret for fifteen years. Dillon told the press that he was a male born with a severe form of hypospadias and had undergone a series of operations to "correct" the condition after he began to display masculine features. The editor of Debrett's told Time magazine that Dillon was unquestionably next in line for the baronetcy, saying: "I have always been of the opinion that a person has all rights and privileges of the sex that is, at a given moment, recognized." Dillon found the sudden reveal of his transition distressing, retreated from his colleagues for ten days after the news broke and contemplated suicide. He felt that he needed to travel to India and remain there for a few years in order to let the negative attention subside. After being outed, he resigned from his employer and left his club in London, despite both institutions stating they were happy for him to stay.

== Buddhism ==
=== Theravada Buddhism ===
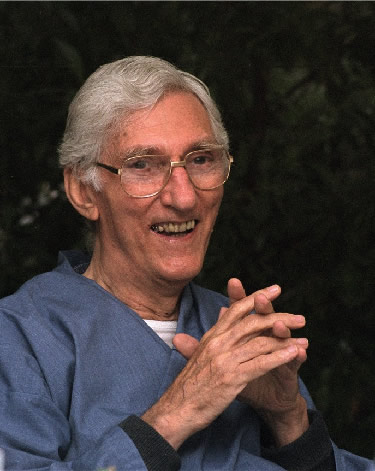
Sangharakshita pictured in 2002.

When Dillon's ship travelled back to India, he stayed in the country and travelled to Kalimpong, as suggested by Rimpoche. When Dillon returned to visit Rimpoche, however, he found that the monk was unwilling to meet him. This was due to an incident involving a former Catholic nun—ordained by Rimpoche—who had subsequently made sexual assault allegations against monks and laymen, and was allegedly a Communist spy. Because of this, Rinpoche was unwilling to admit any other Europeans into the monastic order. Rimpoche suggested that Dillon stayed at a monastery of the Theravada tradition which was directed by an English monk named Sangharakshita. Dillon and Sangharakshita did not get on well; the monk found it difficult to teach Dillon and Dillon thought he was being over-charged for his education. Despite their disagreements, Dillon revealed the details of his transition and the reason he had left to Navy to Sangharakshita. Dillon assumed that this information was under strict secrecy, but Sangharakshita later claimed that this was not the case. Wanting to avoid the attention that came with his current identity, Dillon decided to change his name. He was given the name Jivaka by Sangharakshita—the same name as the Buddha's doctor.

Jivaka stayed for a period at the Theravada Vihāra in Sarnath. For the first few months there, he was unable to access the library or read the dharma. It was only when Sangharakshita left on business that he was able to access the materials. While Sangharakshita was away, Jivaka decided he wanted to be ordained as a novice monk (a samanera). Although feeling uncomfortable with the situation, knowing that Jivaka had been born a woman, Sangharakshita initially did not intervene. Jivaka decided to leave the monastery as he found the environment to be difficult and he found Sangharakshita to be unsupportive of his ambitions.

Jivaka assumed a life of poverty and gave away his estate of £20,000, (Note: Approximately 405,000 today.) consisting of savings and inheritance, to charity and the people he deemed most in need. He also renounced his peerage. He was interested in pursuing higher ordination but learnt that the Theravada tradition did not allow anyone from the so-called 'third sex' to ordain. Jivaka personally interpreted the rule to mean that he should not necessarily be prohibited from ordaining. He wrote to Sangharakshita to explain his reasoning and inform him of his upcoming ordination, but the monk did not share his views. When Sangharakshita found out about Jivaka's intentions to further pursue ordination as a bhikkhu, he wrote to the monks at the Vihāra and told them Jivaka used to be a woman. Upon reading the letter, the monks ultimately forbade Jivaka's ordination. Jivaka's essay A Critical Study of the Vinaya, published by the Sarnath Maha Bodhi Society in 1960, does not reveal Jivaka's own personal experiences of discrimination but argues for greater acceptance of "deformed people", "hermaphrodites" and eunuchs, who were not allowed to be ordained. Jivaka argued that Buddhism was meant to be a religion of tolerance and that people who were in some way disabled had a lot to offer to the religion. Professor of Tibetan Buddhism, José Ignacio Cabezón, writes that "there is no question that A Critical Study of the Vinaya is in part biographical".

=== Tibetan Buddhism ===
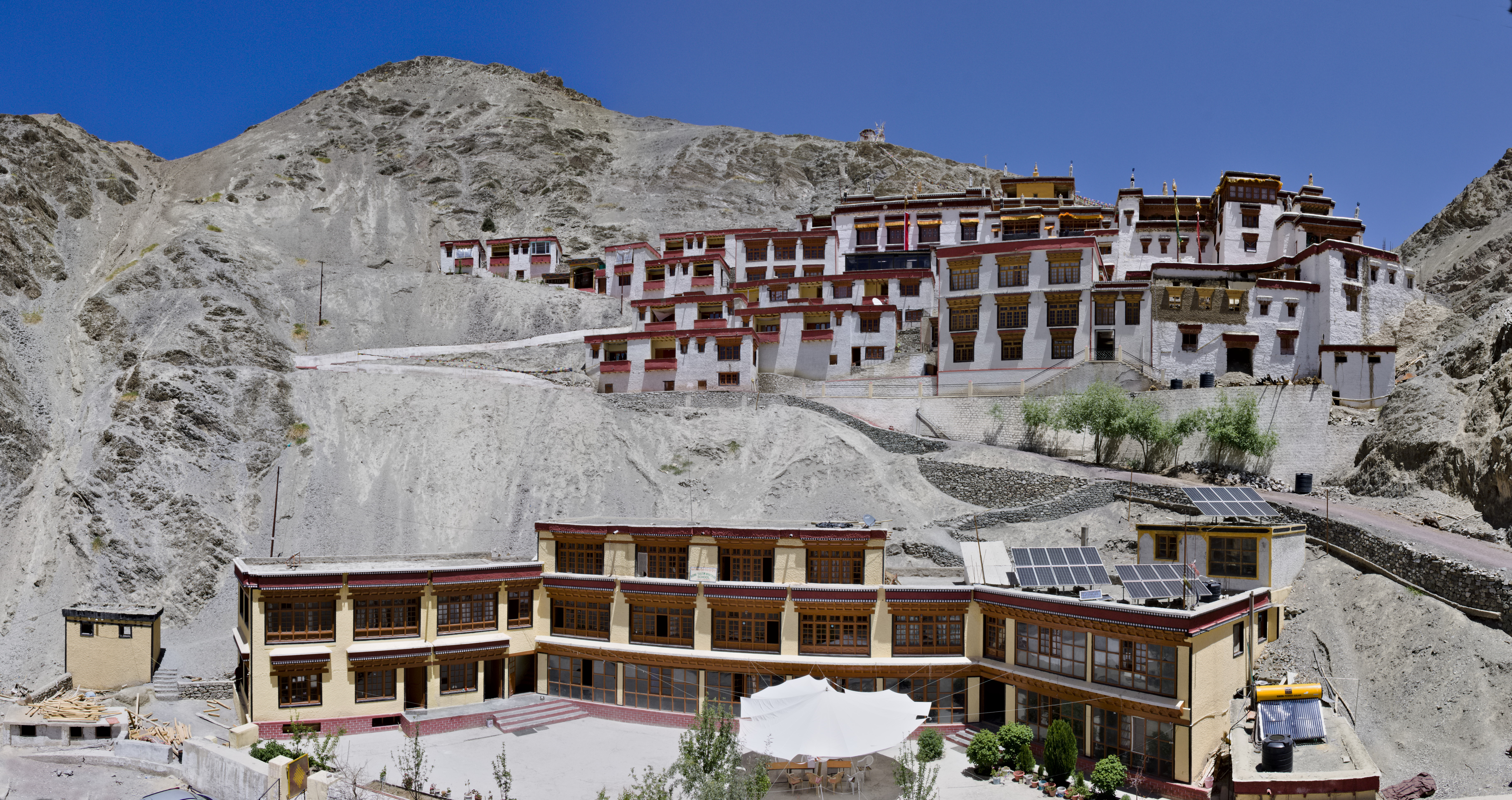
Jivaka entered the Rizong Monastery as a novice monk in 1960.

Following this setback, Jivaka turned to the Tibetan branch of Buddhism. The senior Tibetan monk at Sarnath, Denma Locho Rinpoche, did not see Jivaka's transition as an issue, and suggested Jivaka could achieve full ordination. Jivaka had heard about the Rizong Monastery in Ladakh and had ambitions to attend himself. Because Ladakh was an area disputed between India and China, a specific permit was required by foreigners if they wished to obtain prolonged access to the area. In 1960, Jivaka was able to secure permission to enter from Kushok Bakula, a Ladakhi prince. Kushok Bakula happened to choose Rizong as the monastery which Jivaka would attend. The prince allowed him to ordain as a novice—the lowest level of ordination which mostly consisted of boys. Jivaka thus claimed to have become the first person from the West to be ordained as a Tibetan novice monk (getsul) and to attend Rizong. Despite his low rank as a monk, he was granted entry into the monastery's library. Jivaka felt welcomed and secure at the monastery, writing that he felt "at home among strangers who were no strangers at all". Despite this, Jivaka struggled to afford food, did not become accustomed to the vegetarian diet, and was often on the verge of starvation.

Jivaka was not able to renew his visa and had to leave the Rizong monastery after three months. He returned to Sarnath and began work on two books, including Imji Gestul, which recounted his residency at the monastery. In late 1960, Jivaka contracted typhoid fever and was forced to reside in a charity hospital where he received inadequate treatment. He managed to maintain a small income through writing about Tibetan Buddhism. He wished to return to Ladakh, but he struggled to secure entry in part due to being reticent to discuss his past. He was accused by a communist newspaper of being a British spy, and a different newspaper revealed his transition, calling him a "lady-doctor". Jivaka assumed that Sangaharakshita was behind the rumour. He wrote to the monk asking to be sent the draft of his incomplete autobiography he had worked on, driven by a wish to complete the manuscript and write his own life story in his own words.

== Death and legacy ==
On 1 May 1962, Dillon (also going under the name Jivaka) completed the manuscript of his autobiography titled Out of the Ordinary and mailed it to his literary agent. Whilst travelling to Kashmir in another attempt to renew his entry to Ladakh, he collapsed and was taken to the Civil Hospital of Dalhousie. He died in the hospital on 15 May 1962. His death was unexplained, but malnourishment and typhoid fever likely contributed. His body was cremated in a Mahayana ceremony. After Dillon's death, it was reported that his brother wished the manuscript for Out of the Ordinary to be burned, but Dillon's agent did not comply. It remained in storage until it was discovered by author and biographer Liz Hodgkinson who used it to write her biography of Dillon titled Michael née Laura (1989). The manuscript was also used by Pagan Kennedy to write another biography of Dillon, The First Man-Made Man (2007). The autobiography was published in full in 2016, entitled Out of the Ordinary: A Life of Gender and Spiritual Transitions.

Michael Dillon and Roberta Cowell were the subjects of a 2015 Channel 4 documentary titled Sex Change Spitfire Ace. The documentary told the story of their lives and featured interviews with Liz Hodgkinson and Cowell's daughter Diana. In 2020, St Anne's College, Oxford announced a new lecture series called The Michael Dillon LGBT+ Lectures, in honour of Dillon, which featured talks from LGBT+ figures including Lord Smith of Finsbury, Zing Tsjeng and CN Lester. The American playwright Else Went wrote An Oxford Man, based on Dillon's life; the play was nominated for the 2025 Susan Smith Blackburn Prize.

== Publications ==
=== Self: A Study in Endocrinology and Ethics (1946), Michael Dillon ===
Dillon began writing Self in 1939 whilst working at College Motors. It was published in 1946 under the Heinemann Medical imprint. In the book, Dillon argues that people should be able to receive medical treatment which would alter their bodies to match with their internal feeling of their sex. He makes the case that these feelings cannot be cured purely through psychological means. Dillon does not reveal his personal involvement with the matter, narrating as if he were an interested third party—in this regard, Susan Stryker describes the book as a "cryptoautobiography".

Dillon makes the case that sex is on a spectrum between male and female with a gradient of intersex individuals in between. Dillon writes that treatment can be given to those patients if their gender identity does not match their assigned sex—for instance, he writes about people with hypospadias and how they can be incorrectly assigned female at birth. A particular group of intersex people, which Dillon calls homosexuals, are those who have the genitalia of one sex but the characteristics of the opposite. He distinguishes between the exploration of one's "homosexuality" during their younger years, compared to a permanent state of homosexuality which is innate. Dillon primarily discusses the different types of "female homosexuals": "mannish inverts", Dillon argues, have acquired their "mannish" characteristics, whereas "masculine inverts" have innate male characteristics. Dillon writes that this latter group require medical treatment in the same manner as intersex people, and they should not have to pay for it. He concludes by advocating for tolerance and understanding of people who do not align with the traditionally-understood notion of sex. Many of the arguments in the book are similar to those made two decades later by Harry Benjamin in his book The Transsexual Phenomenon (1966). In her biography of Dillon, Liz Hodgkinson describes Self as "well written, scholarly, intelligent and decades ahead of its time."

=== Poems of Truth (1957), Michael Dillon ===
Dillon had been discouraged from writing poetry as a teenager by his aunt Toto, but began writing again whilst at sea. His surviving collection—Poems of Truth—was completed in Belfast and had a thousand copies privately published by Linden Press in 1957. Only one shop ended up stocking copies of the book. Dillon described the poems as being inspired by the works of the philosopher George Gurdjieff. Liz Hodgkinson describes them as "derivative, sombre, hymn-like in sentiment and archaic in language, with nothing really original in them."

=== The Life of Milarepa (1962), Lobzang Jivaka ===
In 1959, Dillon discovered the story of the 11th-century Tibetan saint Milarepa, and decided to rewrite Walter Evans-Wentz's English translation of The Life of Milarepa in a style which he deemed would be more popular to Western readers. He completed the translation later that year and contacted the publisher John Murray to enquire whether they would be interested in distribution. An editor at John Murray responded positively, requesting an additional introductory chapter to serve as an introduction to Buddhism, as well as asking for details of Dillon's name. (Note: At the time, Dillon signed his letters to the editor as 'Jivaka (sramenera)'.) Fearful that details of his transition and outing in the press would be exposed, Dillon evaded the probing into his former name and persuaded John Murray to publish his works under the name Jivaka. The Life of Milarepa was released in Great Britain in April 1962, shortly before Dillon's death.

=== Imji Getsul: An English Buddhist in a Tibetan Monastery (1962), Lobzang Jivaka ===
Imji Getsul (which translates to 'English Novice') is a retelling of Dillon's time in the Rizong Monastery. Biographer Pagan Kennedy describes the books as "more of a love story than anything else, a paean to the home he'd found and then lost." After John Murray rejected the initial draft, Dillon found a literary agent—John Johnson—willing to take him onboard, who successfully submitted the manuscript to Routledge. Although Dillon published under Jivaka and was not forced to reveal his former name, he did include a slightly falsified chapter in the book which described his boyhood and claimed he had served in the military during World War II. He completed Imji Getsul in late 1960, after he was forced to leave Rizong. The book was published in Great Britain in 1962.

=== Out of the Ordinary: A Life of Gender and Spiritual Transitions (1962; published 2016), Michael Dillon/Lobzang Jivaka ===
Dillon's autobiography was written and published under both of his names, Michael Dillon and Lobzang Jivaka. It was completed in 1962 and Dillon's agent, John Johnson, received the manuscript not long after Dillon had died. He was contacted by Dillon's brother Robert who wished to acquire the manuscript in order to destroy it. The manuscript was retained by Johnson, who refused to destroy it, but he was unable to find a publisher. Andrew Hewson took over care of the manuscript after Johnson and it was kept in a storage facility in London. The lack of an interested publisher may have been due to disputes regarding Dillon's will, the actions of Dillon's brother, the niche subject matter, or the style of prose itself.

The manuscript was shared three significant times: Liz Hodgkinson was writing a biography of Dillon and, in the 1980s, approached Hewson for the manuscript. She would eventually publish her book Michael née Laura (1989). She feared that Dillon's surviving relatives might seek out the manuscript if she made it too obvious that it was still available. Author Pagan Kennedy also was working on a biography which would eventually become The First Man-Made Man (2007), and was granted access to the manuscript. Out of the Ordinary was eventually published after two transgender theologists, Cameron Partridge and Jacob Lau, attended an event with Kennedy and heard that the manuscript still survived but was unpublished. Lau and Partridge were presented digital copies of the manuscript by Kennedy and set about publishing the book. The book includes a foreword by Susan Stryker and an introduction from Lau and Partridge which summarises the key events of Dillon's life, including aspects which were not included by Dillon himself. Dillon splits his autobiography into two sections: "Conquest of the Body" and "Conquest of the Mind".

=== Other works ===
- Practicing the Dhammapada (1959).
- Growing Up into Buddhism (1960), a guide to Buddhism aimed at a younger audience.
- A Critical Study of the Vinaya (1960), an essay arguing for greater acceptance of people according to the Vinaya texts.
