= Society of Physicists of Macedonia =

- Друштво на физичарите на Република Македонија
- Abbreviation: ДФРМ (DFRM)
- Formation: 1949
- President: Lambe Barandovski
- Website: www.dfrm.org

The Society of Physicists of Macedonia (Macedonian: Друштво на физичарите на Република Македонија, Drushtvo na Fizicharite na Republika Makedonija) is a scientific and educational organization established in 1949 in Skopje, Macedonia. It is located at the premises of the Institute of Physics at the Faculty of Natural Sciences and Mathematics at the Ss. Cyril and Methodius University.

The Society acts as a brokering organization between everyone who works in the field of physics or physical sciences in Macedonia. It also appears as the organizer of the regional (since 1967) and national (since 1957) competitions in physics for primary and secondary schools. Annually more than 500 students join this cycle of competitions and in the end the academic committee assigned by the Society chooses the best four students who comprise the Macedonian delegation to the International Physics Olympiad. The leader of the team is chosen among the Society's members and hitherto this duty was performed by Prof. Dr. Viktor Urumov (1995 - 2011 (leader) and 2014 - present (deputy leader)) and Mr. Stanisha Veljkovikj (2012 - ). Since the first time Macedonia sent a team to IPhO, its representatives have won a bronze medal and five honourable mentions.

The Society of Physicists administers the Biannual Conference of the Society of Physicists of Macedonia, which is often visited by many eminent physicists from various countries. The conferences usually last for three to five days.

== Organization ==
The Society chooses its presidency and other notable posts among all its members once in two years at the regular annual meetings. The Society is organized to have an executive board, an academic committee (responsible for organizing the physics competitions) and an editorial board (for the Society's publications). Among the members of the executive board the President, the Secretary and the Treasurer of the Society are elected. The current President of the society is Prof. Dr. Nace Stojanov.

== Publications ==
The Society published two magazines: Impuls (Impulse) and Macedonian Physics Teacher, as well as the journal Physica Macedonia.
