= Spinsters (novel) =

1995 novel by Pagan Kennedy

- Author: Pagan Kennedy
- Language: English
- Publication date: 1995
- Publication place: United States

Spinsters is the 1995 debut novel by Pagan Kennedy. It was shortlisted for the first Orange Prize for Fiction in 1996.

== Plot ==
The novel describes an American road trip by two unmarried thirty-something sisters, Frannie and Doris. Doris was popular and pretty in high school, and still keen to keep moving and meet men, while the narrator Frannie is less keen on the journey and shyer around men. Following their father's death they set out on a journey through America. The action takes place in the late 1960s, and reflects the changes American society was undergoing at the time.

== Critical response ==
Publishers Weekly found it "thoroughly delightful"; they praised the character of Frannie refuted criticisms of the way she achieves selfhood through loving a man.

Entertainment Weekly considered that it lacked the subtlety of Kennedy's debut short story collection Stripping, and said its attempts to link the characters with wider social trends were strained.

Kirkus Reviews called it "deeply flawed, if admirable", due to the attempts to fit in social relevance, and Frannie's voice inconsistent, drifting between "faux-naif" and worldly.

The Austin Chronicle thought that it was too short to do justice to its themes, despite its "great setting, great characters, and great writing".

Alexandra Ganser in her study of female road narratives found it subverted the stereotype of the unhappy spinster by promoting sisterhood and offering a positive depiction of unmarried women.
