= Pagan Kennedy =

American author and columnist

- Born: Pamela Kennedy
- Education: Wesleyan University; Johns Hopkins University
- Occupations: Author, columnist
- Partner: Kevin Bruyneel
- Website: www.pagankennedy.space

Pagan Kennedy (born c. 1963) is an American columnist and author, and pioneer of the 1990s zine movement.

She has written ten books in a variety of genres, was a regular contributor to The Boston Globe, and has published articles in dozens of magazines and newspapers. In 2012–13, she was a The New York Times Magazine columnist.

== Early life and education ==
Born Pamela Kennedy around 1963, she grew up in suburban Washington, D.C. She graduated from Wesleyan University in 1984, and later spent a year in the Masters of Fine Arts program at Johns Hopkins University.

== Career ==
Kennedy's autobiographical zine Pagan's Head detailed her life during her twenties.

In 2007, Kennedy wrote a biography called The First Man-Made Man about Michael Dillon, a British physician and author who in the mid-1940s became the first successful case of female-to-male sex change treatment that included a phalloplasty (the surgical construction of a penis).

In July 2012, Kennedy was named design columnist for The New York Times Magazine. Her column, "Who Made That", detailed the origins of a wide variety of things, such as the cubicle and the home pregnancy test. Kennedy resigned from the column after signing a contract with Houghton Mifflin Harcourt to write a book, Inventology.

In 2020, Kennedy's investigation into the history of the first rape kit written for The New York Times, "The Rape Kit's Secret History", received national media attention. It led to a revival of interest surrounding Marty Goddard's story, including the auction of an early rape kit at Sotheby's. Kennedy went on to write a full-length book about the rape kit, which was published by Vintage Books in January 2025.

=== Teaching ===
Kennedy was a visiting professor of creative writing at Dartmouth College, and taught fiction and nonfiction writing at Boston College, Johns Hopkins University, and many other conferences and residencies.

== Personal life ==
An ovarian cancer survivor, Kennedy currently lives in Somerville, Massachusetts with her partner, Kevin Bruyneel. She previously lived with filmmaker Liz Canner, in a relationship she has described as similar to a Boston marriage.

== Awards ==
Kennedy was a 2010 Knight Science Journalism fellow at the Massachusetts Institute of Technology, and she was named the 2010/2011 Creative Nonfiction grant winner by the Massachusetts Cultural Council. She has also been the recipient of a National Endowment for the Arts fellowship in fiction, a Sonora Review fiction prize, and a Smithsonian Fellowship for science writing.

- Spinsters: Barnes & Noble Discover Award winner, shortlisted for 1996 Orange Prize for Fiction
- Black Livingstone: New York Times Notable list and Massachusetts Book Award honors

== Bibliography ==
=== Novels ===
- —— (1995). Spinsters. High Risk Books. ISBN 9781852424053.
- —— (1998). The Exes. Simon & Schuster. ISBN 9780684834818.
- —— (2006). Confessions of a Memory Eater (paperback 1st ed.). Leapfrog Press. ISBN 9780972898485.

=== Collections ===
- Stripping, and other stories (Serpent's Tail, 1994 ISBN 9781852423223)

=== Nonfiction ===
- Platforms: A Microwaved Cultural Chronicle of the 1970s (St. Martin's Press, 1994 ISBN 9780312105259, reprinted by SFWP 2015)
- Zine: How I Spent Six Years of My Life in the Underground and Finally...Found Myself...I Think (St. Martin's Press, 1995; reprinted by SFWP 2014 ISBN 9781939650108)
- Pagan Kennedy's Living: Handbook for Ageing Hipsters (1997, reprinted by SFWP 2015, ISBN 9781939650504)
- Black Livingstone: A True Tale of Adventure in the Nineteenth-Century Congo (2002, reprinted by SFWP 2013, ISBN 9780988225268)
- The First Man-Made Man: The Story of Two Sex Changes, One Love Affair, and a Twentieth-Century Medical Revolution (Bloomsbury, 2007 ISBN 9781596910157)
- The Dangerous Joy of Dr. Sex and Other True Stories (SFWP, 2008 ISBN 9780977679935)
- Inventology: How We Dream Up Things That Change the World (Houghton Mifflin Harcourt, 2016 ISBN 9780544324008)
- The Secret History of the Rape Kit: A True Crime Story (Vintage Books, 2025 ISBN 0593314719)

=== Anthologies ===
- The Year's Best Fantasy and Horror Eighth Annual Collection (1995)
- The Best Creative Nonfiction Volume 2 (2008)

=== Short stories ===
- Elvis's Bathroom (1989)
