= Flat Lake Festival =

The Flat Lake Literary & Arts Festival
- Genre: Readings, Comedy, Music, Theatre
- Dates: 5–6 June 2010
- Locations: Scotshouse, Ireland
- Years active: 2007–2011
- Website: Official website

The Flat Lake Festival was an annual event organised by the novelist Patrick McCabe and the Welsh film director Kevin Allen on the Hilton Park farm estate in Clones, County Monaghan, first held in 2007. The attractions of the festival included readings, comedy, music and theatre that took place among the barns and bales of hay, abandoned tractors and ancient oaks of the estate over the period of a long weekend, just a couple of miles outside the town of Clones on the back road to Cavan town.¨nthWORD called it a "cheap, off-beat, anarchic weekend that is hard to beat"

The 2012 festival was cancelled in May, a month before it was due to take place. There was no festival in 2013, and an attempt in 2014 to revive the event was also cancelled.

== 2010 Festival ==
=== 2010 Line-up (partial list) ===
Alexei Sayle, Crystal Swing, Jack Lukeman, Mundy, Shane MacGowan, Maria Doyle Kennedy, Viv Albertine, The Swarbriggs, Frankie McBride, Kathy Durkin, The Flaws, Anne Enright
