= Czesław Ścisłowski =

Polish physicist and educator (1904–1971)

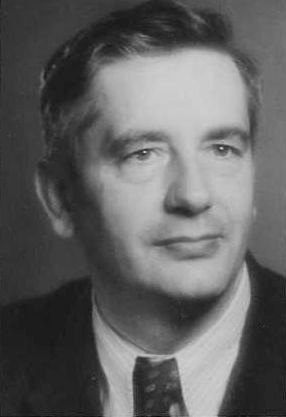
- Born: May 22, 1904; Mogielnica
- Died: August 12, 1971; Warsaw
- Known for: physicist, educator, university professor, high school teacher, initiator and organizer of the International Physics Olympiad
- Awards: medal of the International Conference on Physics Education (ICPE)

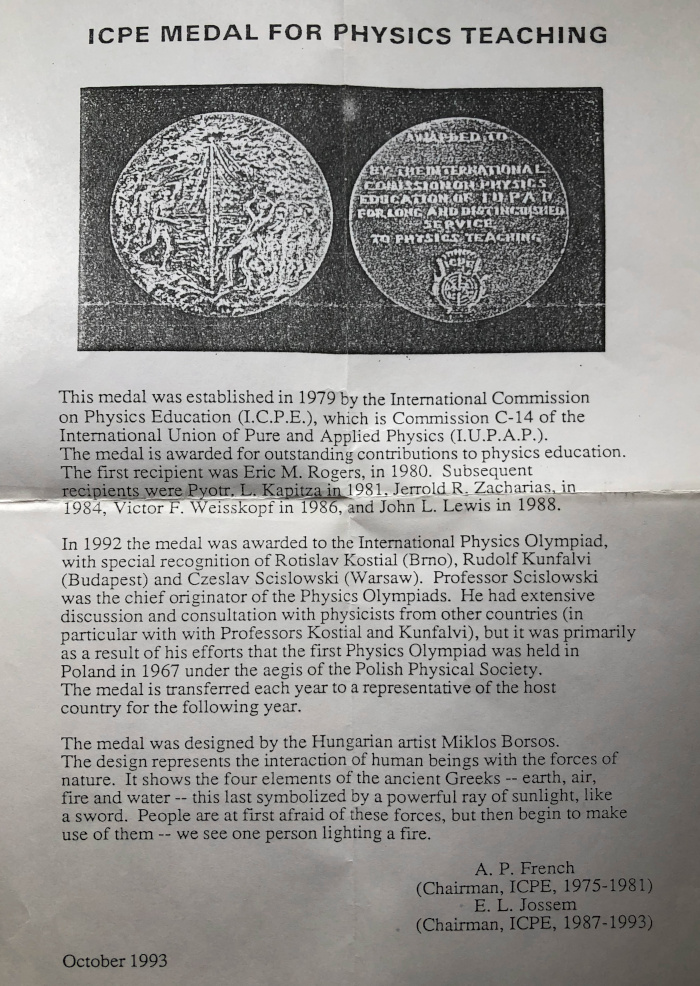
Letter accompanying the awarding of the ICPE medal for the organization of the 1st International Physics Olympiad.

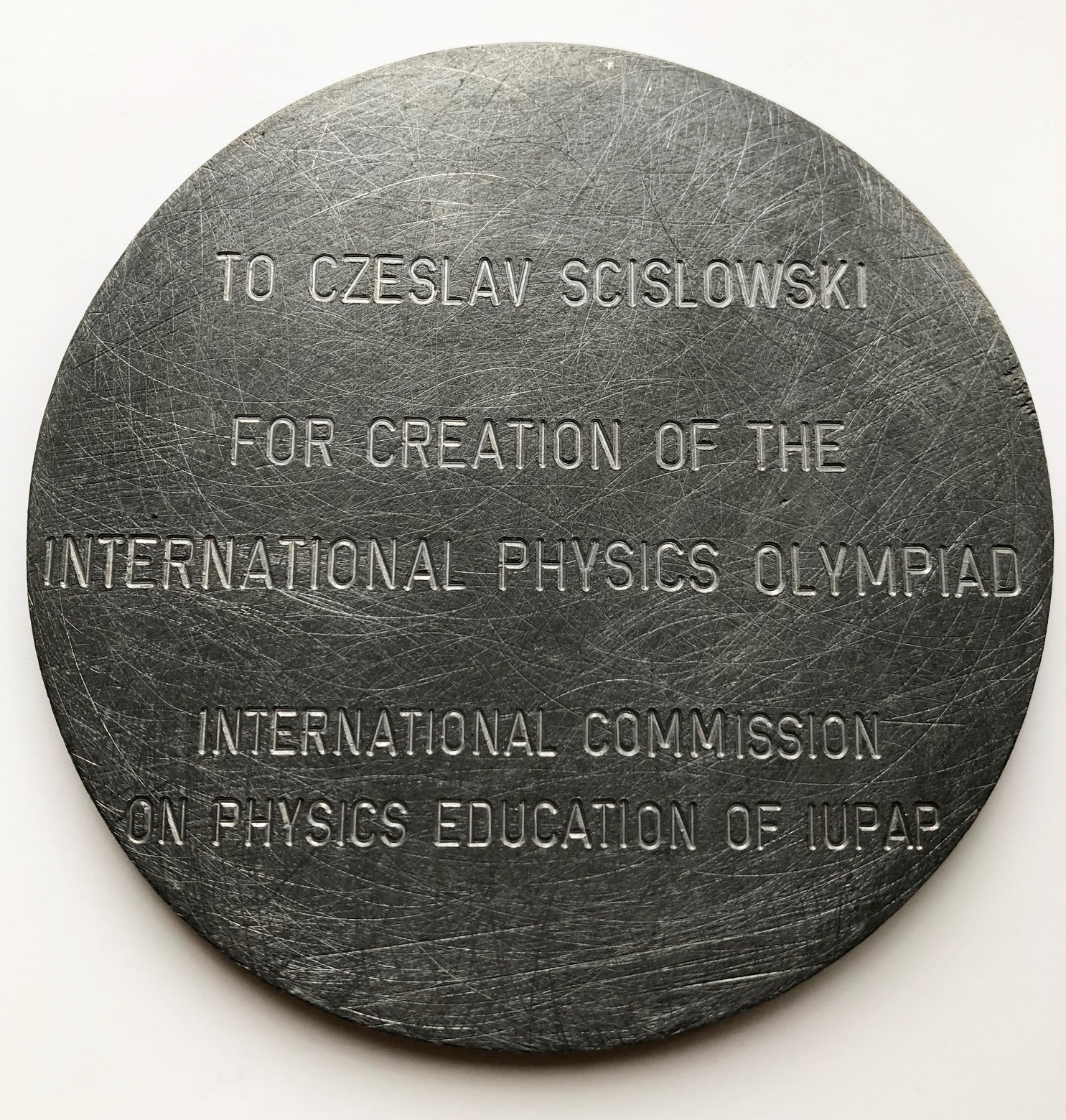
International Commission on Physics Education (ICPE) medal.

Czesław Ścisłowski (Polish: tsheh'swahv shtshes'wohv'skee [ʈ͡ʂɛslaf st͡ɕislɔfskʲi]; May 22, 1904–August 12, 1971) was a Polish physicist, educator, university professor, author of school books and science articles, the initiator and organizer of International Physics Olympiad for high school students. Before World War II he was the principal teacher of the science class at the Stefan Batory High School in Warsaw, many of whose students became wartime resistance heroes.

== Life and career ==
Czesław Ścisłowski was born May 22, 1904, in Mogielnica, central Poland, then under imposed Russian rule, as the only child of fruit farmer and entrepreneur Franciszek Ścisłowski and Franciszka Ścisłowska, née Podogrodzka. In 1924, he graduated from the Władysław Giżycki High School in Warsaw. He took part in amateur theater performances and played the violin. In 1930, Ścisłowski obtained the M.Sc. degree in physics from the University of Warsaw and began his career as a high school teacher.

In 1937-39 he was physics teacher at the Stefan Batory High School in Warsaw, many of whose students fought in the resistance against the Nazi German occupation of Poland during World War II. In the 1943 so-called Operation Arsenal, Tadeusz Zawadzki "Zośka" and Maciej Aleksy Dawidowski "Alek" took part in the daring action to free their former classmate Jan Bytnar "Rudy" from Nazi hands.

During the war Ścisłowski taught clandestine classes in Warsaw and in nearby towns.

After the war he returned to the Stefan Batory High School for two years, as teacher and deputy headmaster, and then took a job teaching physics at the Warsaw Technical University.

Ścisłowski was author and co-author of physics textbooks for primary and high schools. In 1949, the deputy education minister of the communist government of the time, Henryk Jabłoński, criticized the textbooks for referring too much to U.S. and British scientists and inventors rather than to Polish or Soviet ones.

In 1959, Ścisłowski obtained doctor's degree in physics from the University of Warsaw. He was member of the Polish Physical Society.

Starting in 1951, Ścisłowski organized all-Poland Physics Olympiads and in 1967 he organized in Warsaw the first International Physics Olympiad of which he was the originator. The participants came from the East Bloc: Czechoslovakia, Hungary, Bulgaria, Romania and Poland. With time, other countries joined in the olympiads, which now span the globe.

He was active professionally until his sudden death on Aug.12, 1971. His resting place is at the Bródno Cemetery in Warsaw.

== Awards and honours ==
In 1992, Ścisłowski was awarded a medal by the International Commission on Physics Education for "outstanding contribution to physics education." In awarding the medal, the commission recognized that it was "primarily as a result of his efforts that the first International Physics Olympiad was held in Poland in 1967 under the aegis of the Polish Physical Society."

== Sources ==
- Zdzisław Szeląg "Słownik wiedzy o grójeckim" volume II Towarzystwo Literackie im. Adama Mickiewicza w Grójcu 1994
- Cz. F. [Czesław Fotyma] "Dr Czesław Ścisłowski nie żyje" Fizyka w szkole 1971 number 6 pages 58–59 Wydawnictwo Ministerstwa Oświaty i Szkolnictwa Wyższego - Państwowe Zakłady Wydawnictw Szkolnych 1971
