= Inventology =

Inventology: How We Dream Up Things That Change the World
- First edition (publ. Eamon Dolan/HMH)
- Author: Pagan Kennedy
- Language: English
- Publication date: 2016

Inventology: How We Dream Up Things That Change the World is a 2016 book by Pagan Kennedy, in which the author details the processes by which people come up with innovative ideas.

In a starred review, Kirkus Reviews called it "[a] delightful account".
