= Jan de Boer (physicist) =

Dutch theoretical physicist (born 1967)

- Born: 29 June 1967 (age 59)
- Education: University of Groningen, Utrecht University
- Occupation: Physicist
- Years active: 1984–present
- Employer: University of Amsterdam

Jan de Boer (born 29 June 1967, in Doniawerstal) is a Dutch theoretical physicist specializing in string theory. After earning a double master's degree in mathematics and physics at the University of Groningen, De Boer obtained his PhD from Utrecht University in 1993 with the dissertation Extended conformal symmetry in non-critical string theory. He continued his studies at Stony Brook University and the University of California, Berkeley.

Since 2000, he has been professor of theoretical physics at the University of Amsterdam.

From 1946 to 1981, an unrelated Jan de Boer (1911–2010) was also a professor of theoretical physics at the same department of the University of Amsterdam, specializing in thermodynamics.

== Awards and fellowships ==
- 1984, First place and gold medal, 15th International Physics Olympiad
- 1984, Silver medal, 28th International Mathematics Olympiad
- 1995–1996, James Simons Fellowship, Stony Brook University
- 1996–1998, Miller Fellowship, Berkeley
