= Bennett Environmental =

Canadian waste management company (1991-2013)

Bennett Environmental Inc.
- Company type: Public
- Traded as: NEX: BEV.H
- Industry: Waste Management
- Founded: 1991
- Headquarters: Oakville, Ontario, Canada
- Key people: Lawrence Haber (CEO)
- Number of employees: 79
- Website: www.bennettenv.com

Bennett Environmental Inc. was a company based in Oakville, Ontario, Canada. It specialized in the recovering of soils contaminated with chlorinated hydrocarbons, including PCBs and PCPs, dioxins and furans.

== History ==
The company was founded in 1991 and had 79 employees. The company sold the soil treatment facility in 2013 and ceased operations as an environmental company. The shell later transformed into Diversified Royalty Corp, specializing in franchise royalty agreements including Mr. Lube, Sutton Realty, and Franworks restaurants.

In 2016, John Bennett, the founder and former CEO of Bennett Environmental was convicted of conspiring to pay kickbacks and committing major fraud against the United States in attempts to win contaminated soil contracts. He was sentenced to 63 months in prison.
