= International Physics Olympiad =

Physics competition for secondary school students

The International Physics Olympiad (IPhO) is an annual physics competition for high school students. It is one of the International Science Olympiads. The first IPhO was held in Warsaw, Poland, in 1967.

Each national delegation is made up of at most five student competitors plus two leaders, selected on a national level. Observers may also accompany a national team. The students compete as individuals, and must sit for intensive theoretical and laboratory examinations. For their efforts the students can be awarded gold, silver, or bronze medals or an honourable mention.

The theoretical examination lasts 5 hours and consists of three questions. Usually these questions involve more than one part. The practical examination may consist of one laboratory examination of five hours, or two, which together take up the full five hours.

== History ==
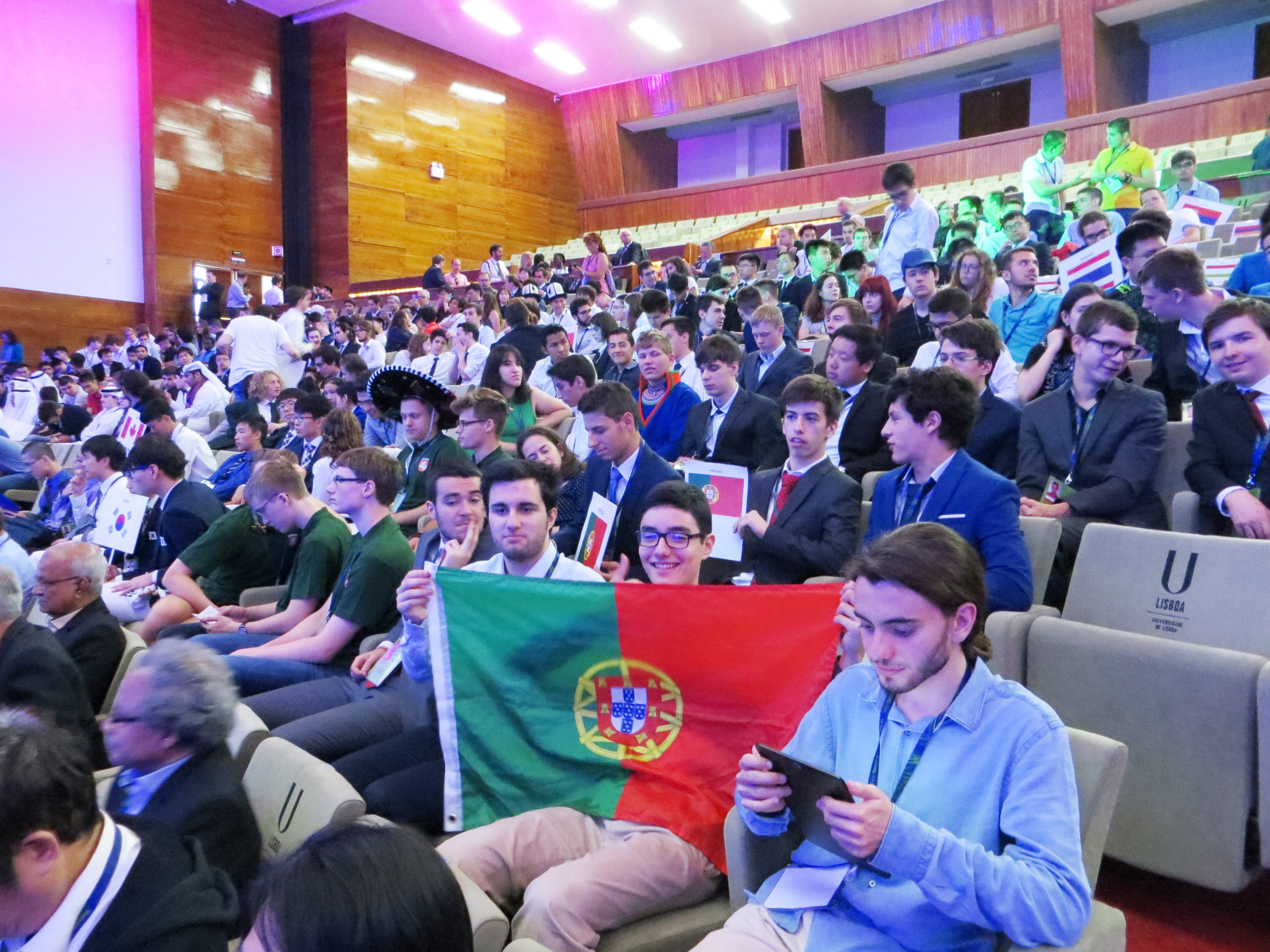
Students at the opening ceremony of the 2018 IPhO in Portugal

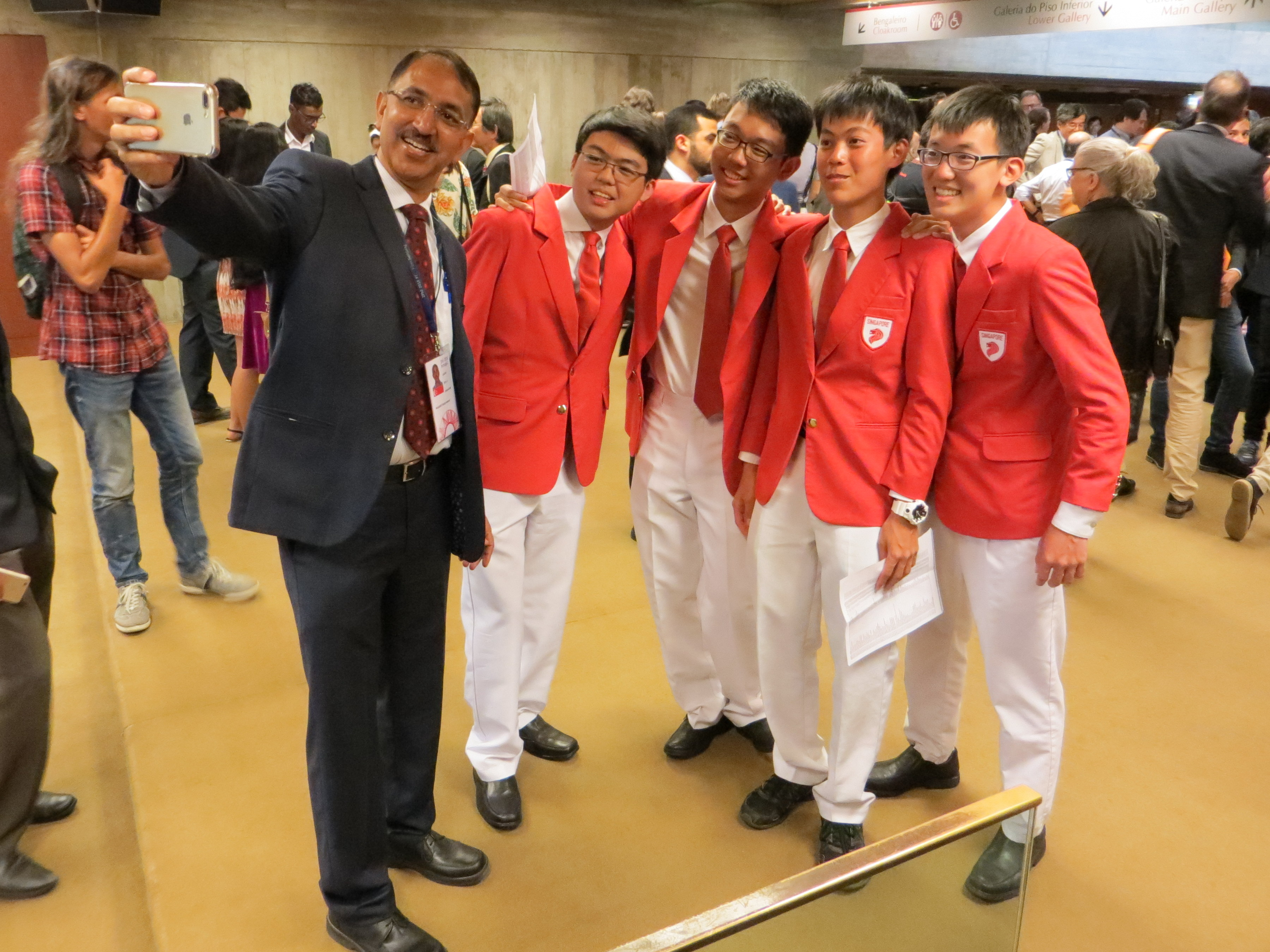
Singaporean IPhO team with the current IPhO president Rajdeep Singh Rawat

The idea of creating the International Physics Olympiad was conceived in Eastern Bloc countries, inspired by the 1959 established International Mathematical Olympiad. Poland seemed to offer the best conditions at the time, and so the first IPhO was held in Warsaw in 1967, organized by Czesław Ścisłowski. Some months prior to the competition, all Central European countries were invited, and the five countries Bulgaria, Czechoslovakia, Hungary, Poland and Romania participated. Each country sent a delegation of three students and one supervisor. Already in this first edition, the competition consisted of two exams, one theoretical and one experimental, and the students went on excursions while their exams were marked.

The second IPhO was held in Hungary, with the additional participation of the German Democratic Republic, the Soviet Union and Yugoslavia. Subsequent editions were carried out in the following years in Czechoslovakia, the Soviet Union, Bulgaria and Romania. At that sixth IPhO in 1972, France joined the competition as the first Western country and Cuba as the first non-European country. With growing size and organizational effort (and no participation fee at that time), no country was willing to arrange an IPhO in 1973. To hold up the competition, Poland volunteered to host another IPhO in 1974, but the problem soon reappeared: With the Federal Republic of Germany, Sweden and Finland, additional Western countries had joined the IPhO, and the Eastern Bloc countries decided in 1977 that they would only host every other IPhO. As the Western countries were not yet ready with the necessary long-term preparation effort, no IPhO was held in 1978 and in 1980. The first Western Country to host the IPhO was the Federal Republic of Germany in 1982. Since then, the IPhO has been held regularly every year except 2020 due to the pandemic, and the organization has become a prestigious endeavor that many countries are happy to take.

The number of participating countries has grown steadily over the years. After the initial set of Eastern Bloc countries, many European countries joined since the 1970s, as well as Asian and American countries starting in the 1980s. Between 1990 and 2000 alone, the total number increased from 32 countries to 63. African countries have been joining since the 2000s. After accession into IPhO, every country must notify the others within five years about its willingness to host the IPhO. The venue of the Olympiad is decided for years ahead. With over 80 actively participating countries today, each IPhO is a big event with around 700 attendees and a total budget of several million euros. A small fraction of the cost is covered by a participation fee of around €3500 per team, which was introduced in 1997 on a voluntary basis and made obligatory in 2013.

The formal structure of the IPhO was established in 1968 at a dedicated meeting in Czechoslovakia, soon after the second IPhO. There the statutes and the syllabus were officially accepted by the International Board, which consists of the delegation heads from all participating countries. The team size was finally set to five students in 1971, and in 1976 the number of experimental problems was set to one or two, while there are three theoretical problems in each competition. In 1984, the IPhO established a permanent secretariat and a president's office. This position was held by Waldemar Gorzkowski until the 2007 Olympiad, then Maija Ahtee (2007–2008), Hans Jordens (2008–2018) and Rajdeep Singh Rawat (2018 onwards). Since 1984 the IPhO has collaborated with UNESCO for moral support and publicity. An advisory committee, consisting of 14 experienced people, was introduced in 1996.

== Distribution of medals ==
=== Top ===
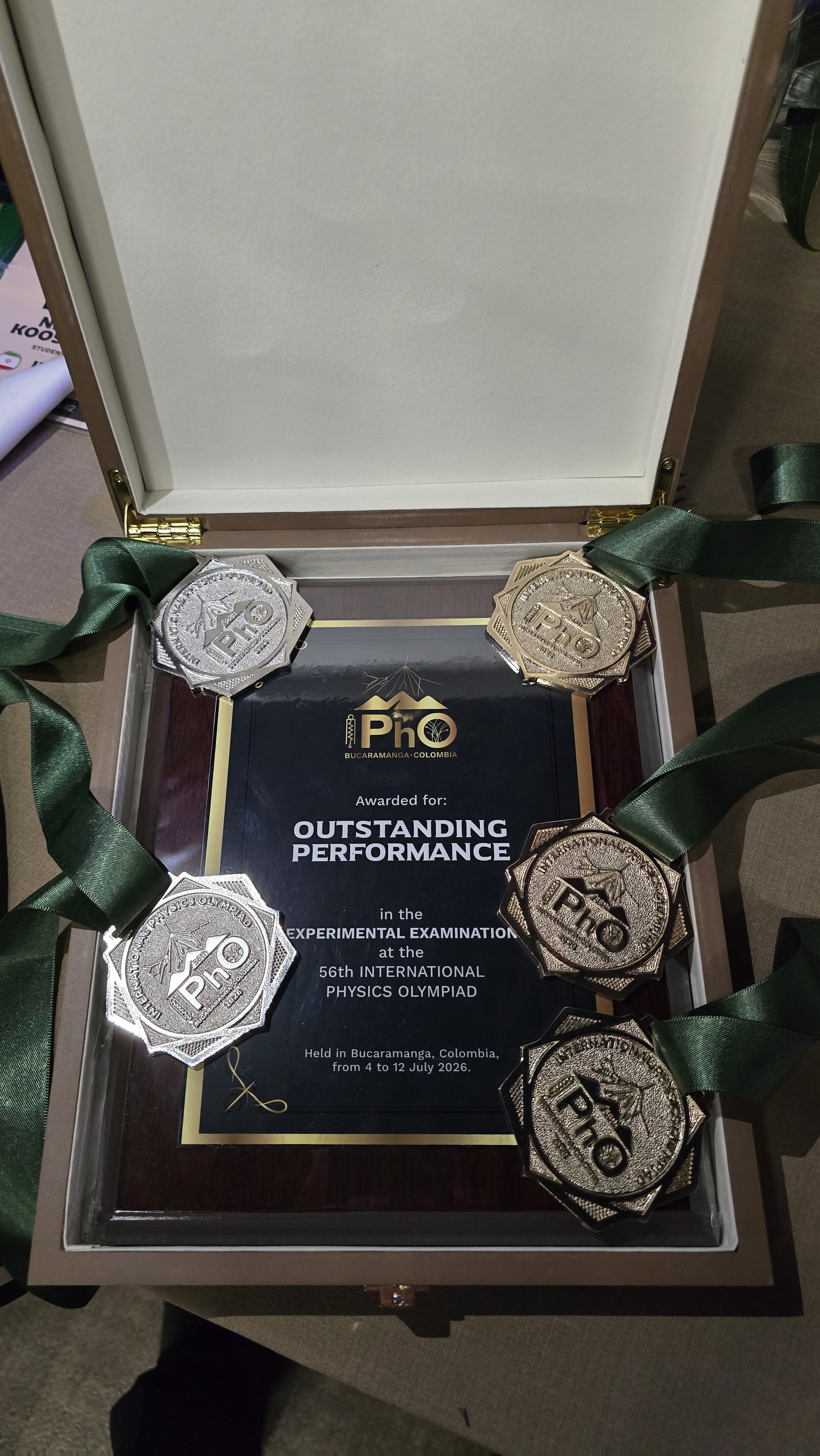
Gold and silver medals and a plaque for the best experimental test winner in ipho 2026

The minimal scores required for Olympiad medals and honourable mentions are chosen by the organizers according to the following rules: A gold medal should be awarded to the top 8% of the participants. A silver medal or better should be awarded to the top 25%. A bronze medal or better should be awarded to the top 50%. An honourable mention or better should be awarded to the top 67%. All other participants receive certificates of participation. The participant with the highest score (absolute winner) receives a special prize, in addition to a gold medal.

The current 25 teams with the best all-time results are as follows as of July 2026:

Participating Team	Gold	Silver	Bronze	Total	Honorable mentions	Gold in Last 10 contests (updated till 2026)
People's Republic of China	160	22	9	191	2	54
Russia	104	49	10	163	4	48
South Korea	97	29	24	150	7	46
Taiwan	90	36	18	144	8	35
United States of America	83	51	29	163	11	31
Romania	64	96	62	222	30	25
India	59	55	14	128	7	28
Singapore	51	55	27	133	25	19
Vietnam	49	59	49	157	18	29
Hungary	45	73	105	223	35	4
Union of Soviet Socialist Republics	41	26	22	89	12	N/A
Islamic Republic of Iran	40	79	39	158	12	10
Thailand	39	54	25	119	19	10
Germany	31	87	86	204	27	3
Indonesia	29	45	51	125	26	6
Hong Kong SAR China	25	44	27	96	3	15
Poland	24	54	90	168	69	2
Japan	25	45	21	91	4	15
Ukraine	20	65	62	147	13	5
Bulgaria	15	50	90	155	63	1
Czechoslovakia	15	24	29	68	27	N/A
Kazakhstan	19	48	31	98	25	8
Belarus	14	43	58	115	27	5
United Kingdom	13	57	88	159	23	2
Israel	14	59	39	151	24	8

=== All IPhO ===
https://ipho-unofficial.org/countries/

Since 1967 to 2026:

In almost every edition, the top 10% of participants receive gold, the next 20% receive silver, and the next 30% receive bronze.

International Physics Olympiad medal table
Rank	Nation	Gold	Silver	Bronze	Total
1	China (CHN)	160	22	9	191
2	Russia (RUS)	104	49	10	163
3	South Korea (KOR)	97	29	24	150
4	Taiwan (TWN)	90	36	18	144
5	United States (USA)	83	51	29	163
6	Romania (ROU)	64	96	62	222
7	India (IND)	59	55	14	128
8	Singapore (SGP)	51	55	27	133
9	Vietnam (VNM)	49	59	49	157
10	Hungary (HUN)	45	73	105	223
11	Soviet Union (URS)	41	26	22	89
12	Iran (IRN)	40	79	39	158
13	Thailand (THA)	39	54	25	118
14	Germany (GER)	31	87	86	204
15	Indonesia (IDN)	29	45	51	125
16	Japan (JPN)	25	45	21	91
17	Hong Kong (HKG)	25	44	27	96
18	Poland (POL)	24	54	90	168
19	Ukraine (UKR)	20	65	62	147
20	Kazakhstan (KAZ)	19	48	31	98
21	Bulgaria (BGR)	15	50	90	155
22	Czechoslovakia (CZS)	15	24	29	68
23	Israel (ISR)	14	59	39	112
24	Belarus (BLR)	14	43	58	115
25	Turkey (TUR)	13	58	57	128
26	Great Britain (GBR)	13	57	88	158
27	Czech Republic (CZE)	10	38	65	113
28	Australia (AUS)	10	35	78	123
29	Slovakia (SVK)	9	29	61	99
30	Canada (CAN)	9	28	66	103
31	France (FRA)	8	56	43	107
32	Brazil (BRA)	8	18	54	80
33	East Germany (GDR)	8	14	35	57
34	Estonia (EST)	6	24	46	76
35	Azerbaijan (AZE)	5	14	28	47
36	Netherlands (NLD)	5	13	61	79
37	Slovenia (SVN)	5	12	48	65
38	Serbia (SRB)	4	27	46	77
39	Austria (AUT)	4	12	40	56
40	Lithuania (LTU)	3	16	50	69
41	Georgia (GEO)	3	14	36	53
42	United Arab Emirates (UAE)	3	0	6	9
43	Armenia (ARM)	2	13	46	61
44	Sweden (SWE)	2	12	32	46
45	Yugoslavia (YUG)	2	12	23	37
46	Finland (FIN)	2	10	41	53
47	Switzerland (SUI)	2	6	31	39
48	Macau (MAC)	2	4	28	34
49	Malaysia (MAS)	2	2	19	23
50	Italy (ITA)	1	25	66	92
51	Moldova (MDA)	1	15	40	56
52	Latvia (LVA)	1	6	41	48
53	Spain (ESP)	1	5	30	36
54	Norway (NOR)	1	0	9	10
55	Mongolia (MNG)	0	17	35	52
56	Croatia (HRV)	0	9	45	54
57	Saudi Arabia (SAU)	0	8	25	33
58	Turkmenistan (TKM)	0	6	16	22
59	Bosnia and Herzegovina (BIH)	0	5	18	23
60	Bangladesh (BGD)	0	4	20	24
60	Denmark (DEN)	0	4	20	24
62	Philippines (PHI)	0	4	12	16
63	Kyrgyzstan (KGZ)	0	3	17	20
63	Tajikistan (TJK)	0	3	17	20
65	Argentina (ARG)	0	3	16	19
66	Colombia (COL)	0	3	10	13
66	Cuba (CUB)	0	3	10	13
68	Sri Lanka (LKA)	0	2	17	19
69	Portugal (POR)	0	2	13	15
70	Syria (SYR)	0	2	8	10
71	Uzbekistan (UZB)	0	2	7	9
72	El Salvador (SLV)	0	2	6	8
73	Cyprus (CYP)	0	2	4	6
73	Serbia and Montenegro (SCG)	0	2	4	6
75	Egypt (EGY)	0	2	3	5
76	Belgium (BEL)	0	1	24	25
77	Pakistan (PAK)	0	1	19	20
78	North Macedonia (MKD)	0	1	12	13
79	Iceland (ISL)	0	1	6	7
80	Cambodia (KHM)	0	1	3	4
81	Luxembourg (LUX)	0	1	2	3
82	Peru (PER)	0	1	0	1
83	Mexico (MEX)	0	0	28	28
84	Greece (GRE)	0	0	9	9
84	Ireland (IRL)	0	0	9	9
86	Nepal (NPL)	0	0	5	5
87	Montenegro (MNE)	0	0	3	3
87	Nigeria (NGA)	0	0	3	3
89	Liechtenstein (LIE)	0	0	2	2
89	Qatar (QAT)	0	0	2	2
91	Albania (ALB)	0	0	1	1
91	Bolivia (BOL)	0	0	1	1
91	Costa Rica (CRI)	0	0	1	1
91	New Zealand (NZL)	0	0	1	1
91	Puerto Rico (PRI)	0	0	1	1
91	Suriname (SUR)	0	0	1	1
97	Afghanistan (AFG)	0	0	0	0
97	Algeria (ALG)	0	0	0	0
97	Bahamas (BAH)	0	0	0	0
97	Benin (BEN)	0	0	0	0
97	Botswana (BWA)	0	0	0	0
97	Brunei (BRU)	0	0	0	0
97	Burkina Faso (BFA)	0	0	0	0
97	Chile (CHI)	0	0	0	0
97	Ecuador (ECU)	0	0	0	0
97	Gambia (GMB)	0	0	0	0
97	Ghana (GHA)	0	0	0	0
97	Guatemala (GTM)	0	0	0	0
97	Honduras (HND)	0	0	0	0
97	Iraq (IRQ)	0	0	0	0
97	Ivory Coast (CIV)	0	0	0	0
97	Kenya (KEN)	0	0	0	0
97	Kosovo (KSV)	0	0	0	0
97	Kuwait (KWT)	0	0	0	0
97	Madagascar (MDG)	0	0	0	0
97	Mauritania (MRT)	0	0	0	0
97	Morocco (MAR)	0	0	0	0
97	Mozambique (MOZ)	0	0	0	0
97	Myanmar (MMR)	0	0	0	0
97	Nicaragua (NIC)	0	0	0	0
97	North Korea (PRK)	0	0	0	0
97	Panama (PAN)	0	0	0	0
97	Paraguay (PAR)	0	0	0	0
97	Senegal (SEN)	0	0	0	0
97	South Africa (SAF)	0	0	0	0
97	Tanzania (TZA)	0	0	0	0
97	Trinidad and Tobago (TTO)	0	0	0	0
97	Tunisia (TUN)	0	0	0	0
97	Uganda (UGA)	0	0	0	0
97	Uruguay (URY)	0	0	0	0
97	Venezuela (VEN)	0	0	0	0
97	Zimbabwe (ZWE)	0	0	0	0
Totals (132 entries)		1,298	1,918	2,787	6,003

== Summary ==
Number	Year	Host country	Host city	Absolute winner	Score	Medal cutoffs (G/S/B/HM)
1	1967	Poland	Warsaw	Sándor Szalay (Hungary)	39/40	
2	1968	Hungary	Budapest	Tomasz Kręglewski (Poland); Mojmír Simerský (Czechoslovakia)	35/40	
3	1969	Czechoslovakia	Brno	Mojmír Šob (Czechoslovakia)	48/48	
4	1970	Soviet Union	Moscow	Mikhaïl Volochine (Soviet Union)	57/60	
5	1971	Bulgaria	Sofia	Karel Šafařík (Czechoslovakia); Ádám Tichy-Rács (Hungary)	48.6/60	
6	1972	Romania	Bucharest	Zoltán Szabó (Hungary)	57/60	
	1973	Not held as no country was willing to organise it.				
7	1974	Poland	Warsaw	Jarosław Deminet (Poland); Jerzy Tarasiuk (Poland)	46/50	
8	1975	East Germany	Güstrow	Sergey Korshunov (Soviet Union)	43/50	
9	1976	Hungary	Budapest	Rafał Łubis (Poland)	47.5/50	
10	1977	Czechoslovakia	Hradec Králové	Jiří Svoboda (Czechoslovakia)	49/50	
	1978	Not held as no non-socialist country was ready to organise the competition without a prior, necessary long-time preparation effort.				
11	1979	Soviet Union	Moscow	Maksim Tsipine (Soviet Union)	43/50	
	1980	Not held as no non-socialist country was ready to organise the competition without a prior, necessary long-time preparation effort.				
12	1981	Bulgaria	Varna	Aleksandr Goutine (Soviet Union)	47/50	
13	1982	West Germany	Malente	Manfred Lehn (West Germany)	43/50	
14	1983	Romania	Bucharest	Ivan Ivanov (Bulgaria)	43.75/50	
15	1984	Sweden	Sigtuna	Jan de Boer (Netherlands); Sorin Spânoche (Romania)	43/50	
16	1985	Yugoslavia	Portorož	Patrik Španĕl (Czechoslovakia)	42.5/50	
17	1986	United Kingdom	London-Harrow	Oleg Volkov (Soviet Union)	37.9/50	
18	1987	East Germany	Jena	Catalin Malureanu (Romania)	49/50	
19	1988	Austria	Bad Ischl	Conrad McDonnell (United Kingdom)	39.38/50	
20	1989	Poland	Warsaw	Steven Gubser (United States)	46.33/50	
21	1990	Netherlands	Groningen	Alexander H. Barnett (United Kingdom)	45.7/50	
22	1991	Cuba	Havana	Timour Tchoutenko (Soviet Union)	48.2/50	
23	1992	Finland	Helsinki	Chen Han (China)	44/50	
24	1993	United States	Williamsburg	Zhang Junan (China); Harald Pfeiffer (Germany)	40.65/50	
25	1994	China	Beijing	Yang Liang (China)	44.3/50	
26	1995	Australia	Canberra	Yu Haitao (China)	95/100	
27	1996	Norway	Oslo	Liu Yurun (China)	47.50/50	
28	1997	Canada	Sudbury	Sayed Mehdi Anvari (Iran)	47.25/50	
29	1998	Iceland	Reykjavík	Chen Yuao (China)	47.50/50	42 / 36 / 30 / 23
30	1999	Italy	Padua	Konstantin Kravtsov (Russia)	49.80/50	43 / 37 / 31 / 24
31	2000	United Kingdom	Leicester	Lu Ying (China)	43.40/50	37 / 32 / 27 / 20
32	2001	Turkey	Antalya	Daniyar Nourgaliev (Russia)	47.55/50	42 / 36 / 30 / 23
33	2002	Indonesia	Bali	Ngoc Duong Dang (Vietnam)	45.40/50	36 / 32 / 24 / 16
34	2003	Taiwan	Taipei	Pavel Batrachenko (United States)	42.30/50	33 / 27 / 22 / 16
35	2004	South Korea	Pohang	Alexander Mikhalychev (Belarus)	47.70/50	39 / 34 / 25 / 18
36	2005	Spain	Salamanca	Gábor Halász (Hungary); Lin Ying-hsuan (Taiwan)	49.50/50	45 / 41 / 33 / 21
37	2006	Singapore	Singapore	Jonathan Pradana Mailoa (Indonesia)	47.20/50	37 / 29 / 21 / 14
38	2007	Iran	Isfahan	Choi Youngjoon (South Korea)	48.80/50	44 / 38 / 33 / 22
39	2008	Vietnam	Hanoi	Tan Longzhi (China)	44.60/50	33 / 26 / 21 / 14
40	2009	Mexico	Mérida	Shi Handuo (China)	48.20/50	33.35 / 25.10 / 17.45 / 13.05
41	2010	Croatia	Zagreb	Yu Yichao (China)	48.65/50	38.10 / 30.95 / 22.35 / 16.80
42	2011	Thailand	Bangkok	Hsu Tzu-ming (Taiwan)	48.60/50	41.10 / 34.50 / 24.62 / 18.00
43	2012	Estonia	Tartu and Tallinn	Attila Szabó (Hungary)	45.80/50	31.0 / 23.9 / 17.2 / 12.4
44	2013	Denmark	Copenhagen	Attila Szabó (Hungary)	47.00/50	38.6 / 29.5 / 21.5 / 16.7
45	2014	Kazakhstan	Astana	Xiaoyu Xu (China)	41.60/50	27.21 / 18.40 / 12.70 / 9.15
46	2015	India	Mumbai	Taehyoung Kim (South Korea)	48.30/50	42.20 / 30.00 / 24.00 / 18.00
47	2016	Switzerland and Liechtenstein	Zürich	Mao Chenkai (China)	48.10/50	39.80 / 30.70 / 22.70 / 17.50
48	2017	Indonesia	Yogyakarta	Uncertain; Haoyang Gao (China), theory Akihiro Watanabe (Japan), experiment	Not published due to inconsistent marking by organisers, among other reasons.	28.01 / 21.30 / 14.70 / 11.12
49	2018	Portugal	Lisbon	Yang Tianhua (China)	46.80/50	35.00 / 27.20 / 17.80 / 14.05
50	2019	Israel	Tel Aviv	Xiangkai Sun (China)	43.50/50	27.20 / 17.10 / 11.20 / 8.30
	2020	Not held due to the COVID-19 pandemic. A Russia-organized IdPhO 2020 was held instead as an IPhO endorsed event.				
51	2021	Lithuania	Vilnius (online)	Kyungmin Kim (South Korea)	46.25/50	33.37 / 23.74 / 14.50 / 9.15
52	2022	Switzerland	Held online; Belarus was supposed to be host but cancelled due to involvement in the 2022 Russian invasion of Ukraine.	Guowei Xu (China)	43.20/50	23.75 / 16.05 / 11.65 / 7.15
53	2023	Japan	Tokyo	Bowen Yu (China)	45.20/50	35.60 / 25.20 / 17.40 / 13.40
54	2024	Iran	Isfahan	Zhang Xinrui (China)	46.38/50	33.92 / 19.35 / 12.49 / 9.03
55	2025	France	Paris	Hyeokjoon Lee (South Korea)	43.20/50	31.10 / 22.90 / 15.30 / 11.30
56	2026	Colombia	Bucaramanga	Juha Oh (South Korea)	TBD	
57	2027	Saudi Arabia	Riyadh	TBD	TBD	
58	2028	South Korea	TBD	TBD	TBD	
59	2029	Ecuador	TBD	TBD	TBD	
60	2030	TBD	TBD	TBD	TBD	

- In some contests, Taiwan uses Chinese Taipei as their team name.

== See also ==
- International Olympiads in various sciences
- International Young Physicists' Tournament (IYPT)
- Asian Physics Olympiad
- International Olympiad on Astronomy and Astrophysics
