= Rizong Monastery =

Buddhist monastery In Ladakh, India

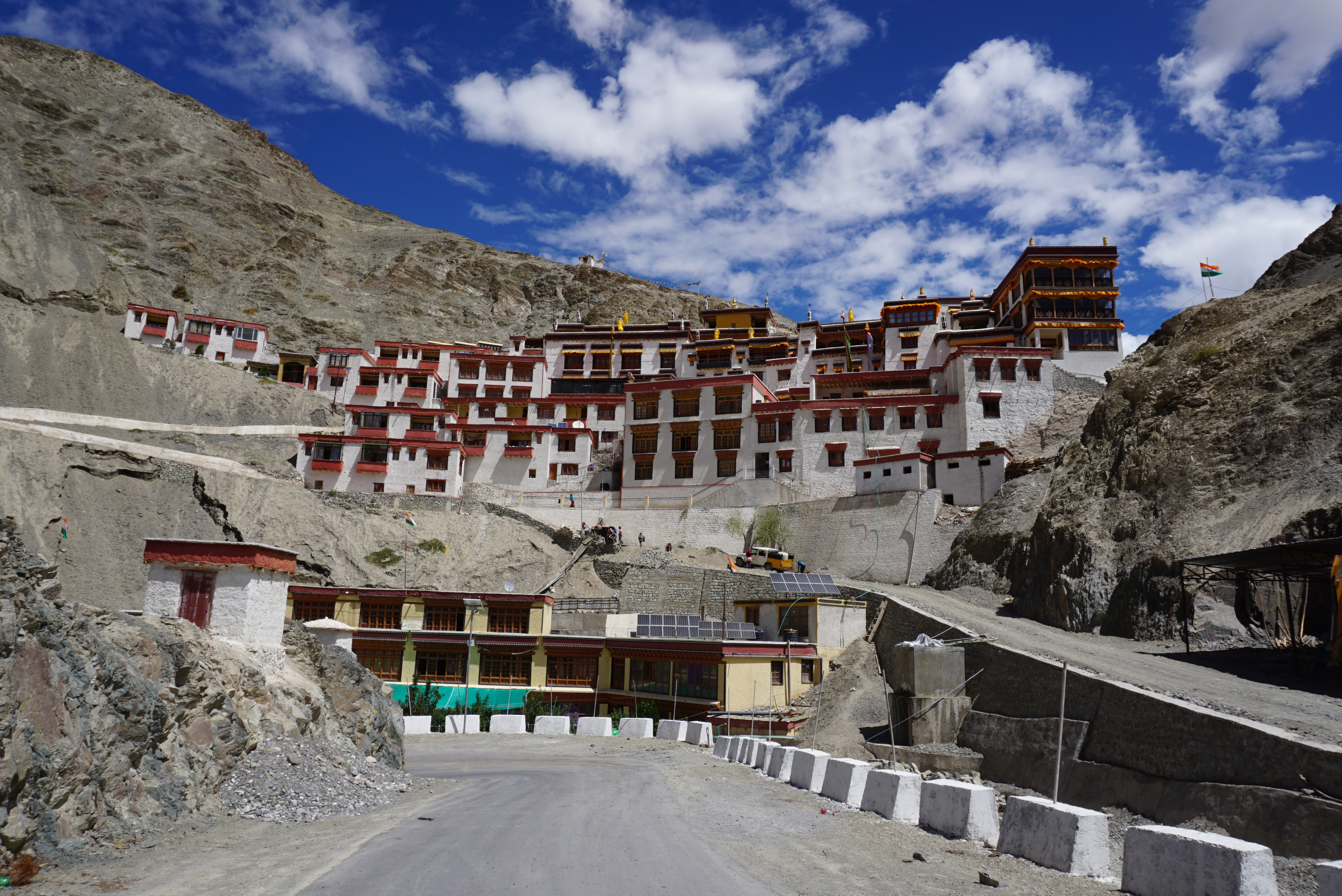

- Location within India

Religion
- Affiliation: Tibetan Buddhism
- Sect: Gelug

Location
- Location: Ladakh, India
- Coordinates: 34°16′9″N 77°6′26″E

Architecture
- Style: Tibetan Architecture
- Founder: Lama Tsultim Nima
- Established: 1831; 195 years ago

Rizong (or Rhizong) gompa, Gelugpa or Yellow Hat Buddhist monastery, also called the Yuma Changchubling, is in Ladakh, India. It is situated at the top of a rocky side valley on the north side of the Indus, to the west of Alchi on the way to Lamayuru. It was established in 1831 by Lama Tsultim Nima under the Gelukpa order, at Ri-rdzong. There are 40 monks in the monastery. The monastery is also called "the paradise for meditation" and is noted for its extremely strict rules and standards. The nunnery, located about 2 km from the monastery, is called the "Jelichun Nunnery" or Chulichan (Chomoling), where, at present, 20 nuns reside. It is north of Srinagar-Leh highway & north of Mangyu temple complex.

It is also believed that long ago Guru Padmasambhava meditated in the caves around Rizong years before the monasteries were built. It is also inferred that in the small caves in the vicinity, Lamas used to meditate for years in isolation from the rest of the villages. They subsisted on one meal a day, which was provided to them by local people through a 1 foot (0.30 m) square window opening in the cave.

== Background ==
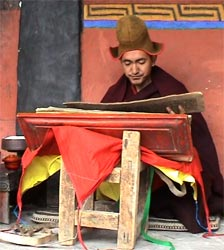
A Rizong monk seated at a special sutra stool reading Mahayana sutras outside the main prayer hall.

Before the monastery was built in 1831, it was started as a hermitage for teaching the Buddhist religion to the monks, with a strict regimen of a celibate life suited to the monastic order.

In the 18th century, Lama Tsultim Nima who meditated at the rDzong-lung mountains decided to establish a hermitage (before he built the present large monastery) here, as a monastery for monks to meditate and learn the teachings of Buddha. Supported by many monks, initially many mud huts were built where they recited gso-shyong. He laid down very strict rules of celibacy called the "Vinaya Rules" to be followed by each monk who meditated here. In brief, rules set are the following.

- Monks are not allowed to leave the monastery, except in the case of sickness
- No comforts of bedding are allowed to sleep at night
- Monks are not to touch anything handled by women (including their own or others sisters)
- Before sun rise or after sunset, Monks can not leave their cell, except to bring water
- Not even a needle worth of possessions are allowed to be owned by the monks
- Fire cannot be lit in their rooms
- Any kind of donation received by a monk from his home shall be shared with other monks in the hermitage
- The boundary of the hermitage was marked by three types of fences and no women was allowed to sleep even in the outer most boundary of the hermitage
- Any rumour about offences that the monks committed would result in their rustication from the monastery

Within the ambit of the above rules, the monks of the monastery would at times become quite sentimental about even inadvertently treading on an insect or even cutting a blade of grass. Over the years, the hermitage became a place of worship and pilgrimage to all Buddhists from Ladakh. It is reported that the king of Ladakh gave rich donations to convert the Hermitage into a retreat centre and the queen of Ladakh even visited this place on a pilgrimage. At this stage, as the number of monks in the hermitage increased, Lama Tsultim Nima decided to build a much larger monastery due to the then location of the hermitage being inadequate to build one large monastery.

== Foundation ==
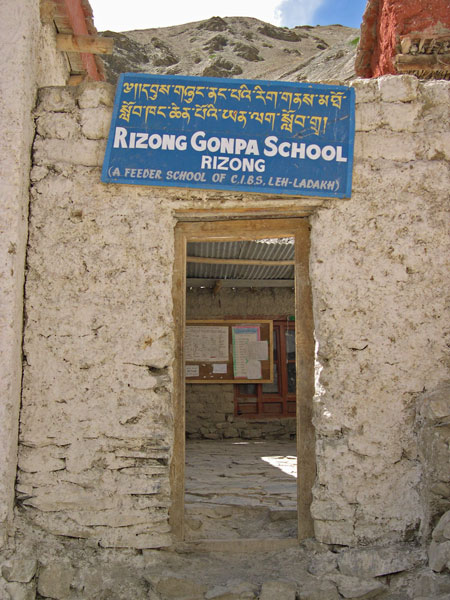
Rizong Gompa school

Lama Tsultim Nima selected a site to build a large monastery, away from the villages, at a place known as Ri-rdzong, since the place had adequate water supply and fuel availability. He launched on a donation campaign to build the monastery for which the villagers also provided voluntary labour during construction. The Monastery was built in 1831 along with many shrines within it. Basically, the monastery has three large chambers. In two of these chambers idols of Buddha have been consecrated. The third chamber houses a stupa.

The hermitage has the distinct reputation of upholding "the Vinaya rules in strict sense of the term", so much so that the lamas of this monastery do not indulge in performances of mask dances or with undue rites and rituals.

The monastery has the distinction of having two incarnate lamas namely, Lama Tsultim Nima and his son Sras Rinpoche, the former is the head of the monastery who generally lives in Manali and the latter is the Abbot of 'rgyud-smad Dratsang'. The Abbott will be elevated to the rank of Dga-ldan Khirpa, the chief of all Tibetan scholastics, after completing a term of two years. During the absence of these two incarnate Lamas at the Monastery, the duties are well allocated to others; the senior most monk (Inas batan) looks after the monastic schedules while his second in command would attend to the house keeping chores such as food and providing other facilities to the monks. In the monastery, which has full control of all its economic activities, there are three groups of people. The first group is of the Lamas (monks), the second of Chomos and the third group is of ordinary folks; the duties of each group and their interrelationships are well defined.

== Structure and layout ==
Views of Rizong Monastery
View of Rizong Monastery	Full view of Rizong Monastery

The following are the details of the structures and idols of deities deified in the monastery's various chambers.

=== Relic shrine ===
A relic shrine, known as Sku–Gdung in local language, that enshrines the old relics of the founder of the monastery is at the centre. It is surrounded by several frescoes of Dharma-raja and other deities.

=== Assembly hall ===
The assembly hall, with the statue of Shakymuni Buddha in the middle, is flanked to its right by idols of Tse-dpag-med, rje-Rin po-che, and Sras Rin Poche Esha Rab-rgyes and Lord Yamakantaka and other deities. To the left of the main deity, idols of Lord Avalokiteshvara and Mahakala are defied. The main hall also has thankhas or wall paintings of Dlama-mchod-pa and Lam-rims.

Scriptures of Bka-gyurand and bstan-gyur are arranged on the sides. The central throne is reserved for the founder with the side seats (thrones) earmarked for Sras Rinpoche and mKhan-po of the monastery. Printing blocks of the biography of Lama Tsulim Nima, many objects made then and the books composed by the first Sras Rinpoche are housed here.

=== Sacred chamber ===
In the sacred Chamber on the west, the statues of Mahakala (protectress deity of the monastery), statue of the founder of the monastery, statue of the second incarnate, Gnas-Bstan Tsual–Khrims Dorji and a Stupa are located. Each row in this chamber has the idols of the two head lamas.

=== Thin-Chen shrine ===
In the Thin-Chen shrine, frescoes of Shakyamuni Buddha's life history are depicted; the idols deified are the Golden Chengchub stupa, Rjo-wo-Rin-Po-cho, silver Chengchub stupa, Arya Avalokiteshwara, a sitting image of Maitreya Buddha, and a set of bka-gyhr.

=== Other structures ===
The chamber on the east has statues of rje-tzone-khapa, mkhas-drub-rje and rgyal-tsabrje. Their writings, in thirty volumes, are also kept there.

The Mandala shrine is the roof over the assembly hall meant for Mandala of Lord Yamakantaka and btra-shis-gyhi-skyong. The four directions of the mandala display religious statues.

=== Julichen nunnery ===
Shakyamuni Buddha statue and wall paintings in the monastery
Shakyamuni Buddha and a stupa inside the monastery	Paintings in an adjoining chamber in the monastery

Julichen nunnery, also transcribed as Chulichan Nunnery, is subordinate to the main monastery. It sustains the needs of the monastery. The 26 nuns who reside here are taken care by the Governing Body of the main Monastery. The nuns fully participate in the economic activity of the monastery and have to work whole day to fully support the economic enterprises of the monastery. It is said that the young nuns who are more educated and candid took to religious curriculum of meditation and Tibetan philosophy, while the older nuns toiled on the fields in the furtherance of the economic activity of the monastery. The nuns are also trained in spinning, oil extraction from apricot nuts and milking cows.

The drudgery and inhospitable living conditions of the nuns in a nunnery are explained vividly by Kim Gutschow thus:

The nuns serve as the worker bees in the monastic hive, which is over seen by monks engaged in their ritual ministrations. Nuns work from dawn to dusk processing the monastery’s vast wealth of grain, apples, apricots and wool. While the monastery sores skyward, at the end of a secluded valley, far above the distractions of human livelihood, the squat and ramshackle nunnery sits amid the monastic fields and orchards. The nuns’ quarters are bursting with odd heaps of barley, drying apricots, woollen homespun waiting to be dyed, abandoned looms, and plowshares in various states of disrepair. Nuns spun most of their waking hours working or cooking for the monastic estate, while living in rooms bereft of religious images.

The social and economic aspects of the nuns of Julichang nunnery, who practice celibate monasticism, have also been elaborately studied by Anna Grimshaw, as part of her PhD thesis. It has been brought out that the celibate nuns provided the agricultural and animal husbandry labour, free of any payments from the monastery. They were exploited with provision of fixed ration for their use. Grimshaw adds that the nuns were given "a portion of harvests, in return for feasts on ritual occasions and year-long provision of spiritual protection". They were given very little opportunities for spiritual prayers also.

Buddhist feminism in nunneries received a further boost after a conference was held on this issue and with the great efforts put in by Palmo, a foreigner, who adopted Buddhism and fought for the cause of the nuns in Buddhist nunneries. The nunnery at Jelichung was expanded, in addition to the Wakahal nunnery, between 1995 and 1998, after awareness was created at the conference. During this period, four new nunneries were also built in Ladhakh and Zanskar under the Ladakh Nuns Association (LNA) that was established by Palmo. This promoted the education, visibility and material status of the nuns in Ladakh.

== Visitor information ==
The monastery is located at a distance of about 73 kilometres (45 mi) from the town of Leh. Leh is well connected by road and air links with the rest of the country.

== See also ==
- List of buddhist monasteries in Ladakh
- Geography of Ladakh
- Tourism in Ladakh
