= Liz Canner =

American filmmaker (born 1968)

- Born: Elizabeth Canner; February 23, 1968
- Occupation: Filmmaker
- Years active: 1991 –
- Spouse: Dr. Alexander Barnett
- Awards: Rockefeller Foundation Next Generation Leadership Fellowship; National Endowment for the Arts Grant; Radcliffe Institute for Advanced Study Fellowship, Harvard University; Visionary Award from Dartmouth College
- Website: www.astreamedia.org

Liz Canner is an American filmmaker who makes documentaries, digital public art installations and new media projects on human rights issues. Her documentary Deadly Embrace: Nicaragua, The World Bank and the IMF (1995), was one of the first films to look critically at the effects of the International Monetary Fund, World Bank policy and globalization. In 2009 Canner directed The New York Times Critic's Pick Orgasm Inc.: The Strange Science of Female Pleasure (2009), a feature-length investigative documentary on the pharmaceutical industry and women's health.

Canner is the founder and director of Astrea Media, Inc., a nonprofit organization dedicated to creating media projects on human rights issues.

Canner graduated with honors in anthropology and visual arts from Brown University in 1991. She has been the recipient of over 50 awards, honors and grants for her work including a Rockefeller Foundation Next Generation Leadership Fellowship for "creating innovative media projects that strengthen democracy", a National Endowment for the Arts Grant, a Radcliffe Institute (Bunting) Film/Video Fellowship from Harvard University and the Visionary Award from Dartmouth College.

A native of Massachusetts, Canner lives in Vermont and New York City, with her husband, Alex Barnett. She previously lived with writer Pagan Kennedy in a set-up they have described as similar to a Boston marriage.

== Films and VR ==
- Lost City of Mer, Chapter 1, a multi-platform VR experience and smartphone app. (2019)
- Orgasm Inc. (2009)
- Deadly Embrace: Nicaragua, the World Bank and the International Monetary Fund (1995)
- State of Emergency: Inside the LAPD (1993) (Co-Director Julia Meltzer)
- Busting the Hype on the LA Riots (1993) (Co-Director Julia Meltzer)
- Hands on the Verdict: The 1992 LA Uprising (1992) (Co-coordinating Producer Julia Meltzer)

== Digital public art documentary projects ==
- Hidden Tribe (2006)
- Bridges (2004)
- Moving Visions (2003)
- Symphony of a City (2001) (Co-director John Ewing)

== Arts Platform ==
- The Arts Oasis (2020)

== Multi-media installations ==
- Distilling the Essence of Women (2004)
- Dream Colony (1996)

== Anti-ad films ==
- Krafty (1999) (with the Anti-ad Agency)
- SUV (1998) (with the Anti-ad Agency)
- Nike (1998) (with the Anti-ad Agency)
