= Double Edge Theatre =

Performing arts company in Massachusetts

Double Edge Theatre is a cultural cooperative and ensemble collective founded in 1982 by Stacy Klein. Focusing on vigorous physical training and the principle of an artist's autonomy, the company has sought to create work in an ensemble setting intimately woven with the community.

In 1994, Double Edge moved from Boston to a 105-acre former dairy farm in rural Ashfield, MA, to create a sustainable artistic home. Today, the farm is a base for the ensemble's international touring, with year-round theatre training, conversations and convenings, greening and farming initiatives, and the production of an indoor/outdoor traveling "spectacle" which takes place alongside the hills, pastures, river and gardens of the facility.

Double Edge's name in part comes from the double-edged axe known as the labrys, which was used in Bacchic sacrifices in ancient Greek cult-worship. Double Edge's first production, Rites, was based on Euripides's The Bacchae.

== Double Edge Productions ==
DE was founded as a feminist ensemble collective by Stacy Klein, with co-founder and emerita ensemble member Carroll Durand and several other women, in Boston, MA. Subsequently named the Women's Cycle, the first 6 performances comprised a series of adapted plays including Rites by Maureen Duffy and My Sister in this House by Wendy Kesselman. The Ensemble was itinerant and performed in six-week rentals of various Boston theatres.

Klein and DE have created seven performance cycles that have toured around the world. The period of 22 years from 2002 to 2024 has included performance cycles, touring, conversations, collaborations, place building, residency and mentorship. Highlights include:

The Garden of Intimacy and Desire (2002-2008), a cycle exploring distinctive visions of magic realism in Jewish and Hispanic culture, was created by Klein with Carlos Uriona and Matthew Glassman.

The Chagall Cycle (2010-2015) was imagined entirely from the visual art Russian-Jewish artist Marc Chagall. Although the Song Trilogy took inspiration from Chagall's work, it was not until this Cycle that performances were created wholly from the visual narrative of an artist. This led to expansive design and further development of the Summer Spectacles (The Odyssey, Shahrazad and The Grand Parade) and a new approach to the inner work of the Ensemble's training and creation process for The Grand Parade, including long-term collaborations with composers, musicians and dramaturgs.

The Latin American Cycle (2015-2018) began as a necessity to come to artistic terms with Cultural Strategist Carlos Uriona's socio-cultural and personal background. Cada Luna Azul (Once a Blue Moon) incorporated the songs and dances of South America in a fictional town called Agua Santa during a military dictatorship. Performance fostered artistic collaboration, residencies, and mentorships with Latino artists and students from Argentina, Chile, Colombia, Guatemala, Uruguay, Venezuela and the US. Once A Blue Moon continued the type of touring initiated in the Republic of Dreams project: site-specific events in buildings and outdoor places which held important contextual meaning.

The Surrealist Cycle (2017–present) loosely weaves together three performances relating to the Latin American Cycle and research into Surrealism. Leonora, la maga y la maestra and Leonora's World drew inspiration from the British-born Mexican artist and writer Leonora Carrington. The conversation Women and Magic (2018) was inspired by these works. The third performance, SUGA, a solo, was created by Co-Artistic Director Travis Coe, directed by Klein, and drawn from Coe's research into his Queer, Black, Latinx and American/Caribbean identity. Each performance of SUGA is accompanied by a pre-performance exhibit and a post-performance respondency.

RITES: A celebration of Double Edge Theatre's 40 Years (2022 – 2023) was dedicated to the Art, Living Culture, and Art Justice which DE has embodied over the past forty years. It included collaborations with DE participants from throughout the theatre's life, an indoor festival in partnership with The Magdalena Project, The Constellations Outdoor Festival featuring the work of our partner organizations, and the world premiere of The Hidden Territories of the Bacchae.

Indoor Performances

- Rainbow Exodus (2022–present)
- SUGA (2019–present)
- Leonora, la maga y la maestra (2018–present)
- The Latin American Spectacle (2015–2018)
- The Grand Parade (2013-2015)
- The Disappearance (2008-2010)
- Republic of Dreams (2007)
- The Unpossessed (2005)
- Relentless (2001)
- Keter, The Crowning Song (1997)
- Song of Songs (1993)
- Song of Absence (1988)
- Request Concert (1986)
- Had She Spoken (1985)
- Bold Stroke for a Wife (1985)
- The Hunger Artist (1984)
- My Sister in this House (1983)
- Blood Rubies (1982)
- Rites (1982)

Summer Spectacles

- The Heron's Flight (2024)
- The Hidden Territories of the Bacchae (2022–23)
- Memories and Dreams (2021)
- 6 Feet Apart, All Together (2020)
- I am the Baron (2019)
- Leonora's World (2018)
- We The People (2017-2018)
- Ashfield Town Spectacle and Culture Fair (2017)
- Latin American Spectacle (2016)
- Once a Blue Moon - Cada Luna Azul (2015–16)
- Shahrazad, A Tale of Love and Magic (2013–14)
- The Odyssey (2011)
- Firebird (2010)
- The Arabian Nights (2009)
- The Illustrious Return of Don Quixote (2008)
- The Magician of Avalon (2007)
- The Three Musketeers (2006)
- Master and Margarita (2004)
- Don Quixote (2003)
- The Saragossa Manuscripts (2002)

== Distinctions ==
- 2010 - Double Edge Theatre was included in the United Nations General Assembly's "2010 Year for the Rapprochement of Cultures."
- 2012 - A documentary on Double Edge Theatre entitled Theatre on the Edge was awarded a regional Emmy.

== Training ==
Double Edge's holistic methodology employs the artist's full potential – emotional, imaginative, physical, vocal – to drive ensemble collaboration, individual exploration, and performance creation. Training Programs are led by the Ensemble, and take place on the Farm and around the world. They include one-day Open Trainings, seasonal Training Intensives, and workshops and residencies off site at universities, collaborating theatres, and other organizations.

Training programs and workshops contain the following elements:

- Physical Training
- Improvisation
- Etudes and Presentations

The physical training includes running, partner work, and work with large objects. The improvisation training combines individual and group work, and includes work with large objects, music, art, video, and other elements. Participants create "etudes and presentations"; scenes using music, art, video, dance, and character, that seek to translate the physical and improvisational training into a devised work process.

== Facilities and Farm ==
The Double Edge Theatre Farm Centre is situated on a 105-acre former dairy farm in Ashfield, MA. Double Edge Theatre facilities include three indoor performance and training spaces, production facilities (wood and metal shops), offices, a public archive, gallery, music room, kitchen, and eight outdoor performance areas, as well as an animal barn, vegetable gardens and hoop house.

Double Edge has four additional properties: a house in the center of town which includes a guest artist studio and private housing for retreat and development; a design house; a building lot which houses a solar farm and apiary; and a new 15-acre lot which currently houses a newly built storage facility and has a 5-acre clearing on top of Ashfield Mountain. A space was gifted to Ohketeau (meaning 'toplant, to grow' in the Nipmuc language), an autonomous Center for Indigenous Culture. The theatre is currently envisioning a Village for Art Justice and Living Culture, created with their partner organizations and built on some of DE's additional properties, that will focus on providing artistic sanctuary for restoration, justice and creativity for people of the global majority. DE's future sustainability and environmental justice vision also includes expanding renewable energy and capacity for farming.
