= Ed O'Loughlin =

Irish-Canadian author and journalist

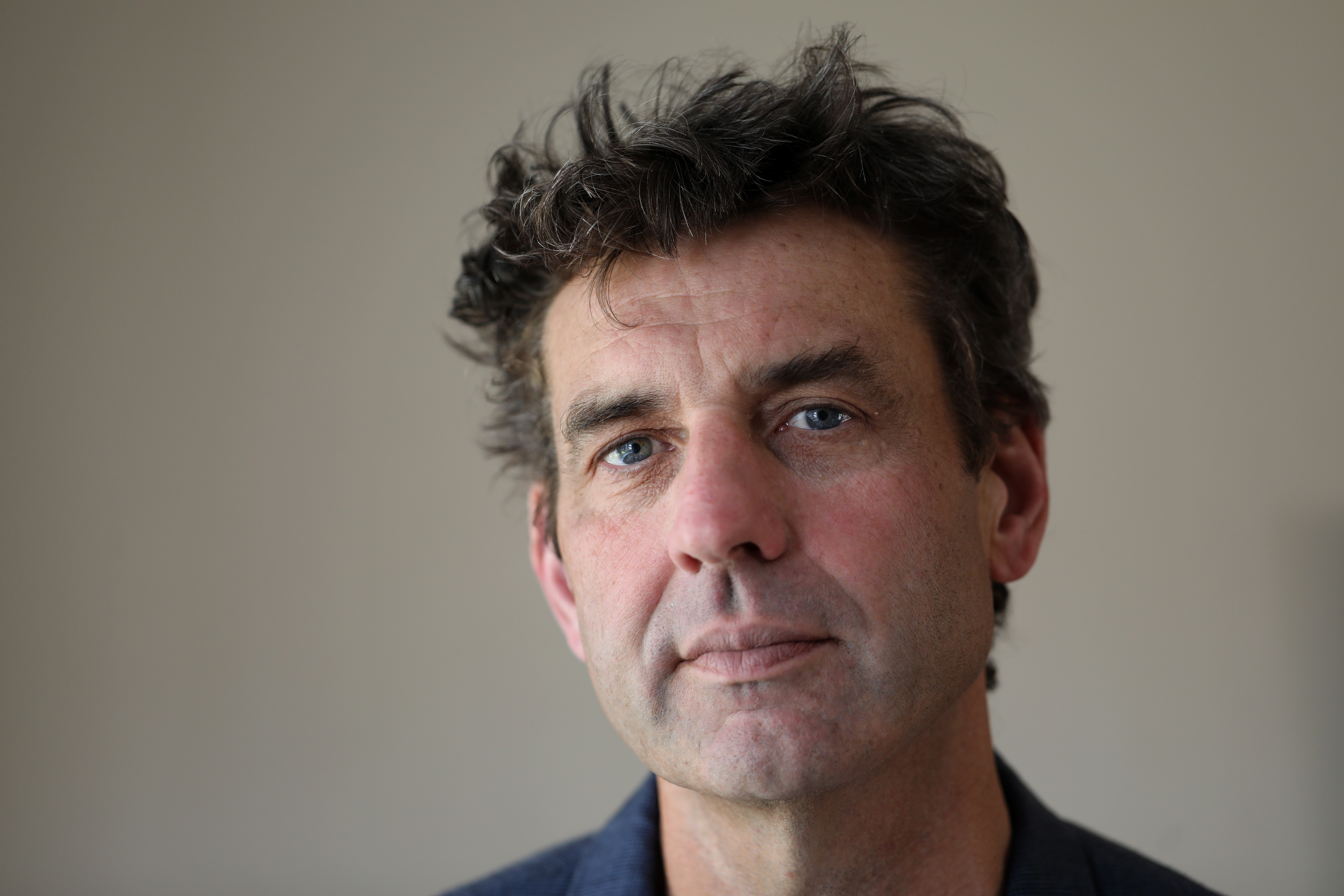
- Ed O'Loughlin in 2020
- Born: 8 December 1966 (age 59); Toronto, Canada
- Occupations: Journalist, writer, reporter
- Years active: 1989 – present
- Spouse: Nuala Haughey
- Awards: Longlisted 2009 Man Booker Prize, Shortlisted 2017 Giller Prize

Ed O'Loughlin is an Irish-Canadian author and journalist. His first novel, Not Untrue and Not Unkind, dealt with foreign journalists reporting on African conflicts. It was long-listed for the Man Booker Prize in 2009 and shortlisted for the Kerry Group Irish Fiction award in 2010.

A second novel, Toploader, was a dark satire on drone warfare and the war against terror. A third novel, Minds of Winter, a multi-generational polar mystery story, was longlisted for the Sir Walter Scott Prize for historical fiction and shortlisted for the 2017 Scotiabank Giller Prize. His fourth novel, This Eden, a metaphysical thriller about money and technology, was published in June 2021.

Before turning to fiction, O'Loughlin worked for twenty years as a newspaper reporter, including fourteen years as a foreign correspondent in Africa and the Middle East for the Sydney Morning Herald, Age of Melbourne, Independent of London, The Irish Times, and others.

Born in Toronto, he was brought up near Kildare Town in rural Ireland. He now lives in Dublin with his wife and two children. Following the success of Minds of Winter, with its themes of mapping and exploration, he was elected a fellow of the Royal Canadian Geographical Society.

Since returning to Dublin, he has reported on Ireland for the Atlantic, the Economist, and the New York Times, and he reviews non-fiction for the Irish Times and the Times Literary Supplement, among others.
