= Alex Barnett (mathematician) =

British mathematician (born 1972)

Alex Barnett (born 1972) is a senior mathematician at the Flatiron Institute and professor of mathematics at Dartmouth College.

Barnett is also a jazz and funk musician. He has composed the music for a number of films by his wife, director Liz Canner.

== Career ==
Barnett attended Cambridge University and received his Ph.D. in theoretical physics from Harvard University. He has written on topics such as efficient and accurate computational methods for waves, PDE eigenvalue problems, periodic problems, and quantum chaos.

His high-frequency eigenfunction calculations are some of the fastest in the world.

Barnett was on the faculty at Dartmouth for twelve years before becoming a full professor in 2017. He was the third person hired at the Flatiron Institute and is currently a senior mathematician there.

== Recognition ==
In 1990, Barnett won first prize in the XXI International Physics Olympiad He has also received the Hockins Prize, the Kennedy Scholarship, the Karen E. Wetterhahn Memorial Award for Distinguished Creative or Scholarly Achievement, the Jeffe Fellowship, and the Harold T. White Prize.
