= Heliopolis (Scudamore novel) =

Novel by James Scudamore

- First edition
- Author: James Scudamore
- Genre: Novel
- Publisher: Harvill Press
- Publication date: February 2009
- Publication place: England
- Media type: Print
- Pages: 278 pp
- ISBN: 978-1-84655-188-8

Heliopolis is a 2009 novel by the British author James Scudamore. It is set in the city and surrounding areas of contemporary São Paulo, Brazil, and follows the story of a young, favela-born man, Ludo dos Santos. The book was nominated for the 2009 Man Booker Prize and is Scudamore's second novel.

== Reception ==
Critic Henry Shukman of The Guardian notes, "The novel is cleverly pitched to explore the two socioeconomic poles of modern urban Brazil. And the writing is exemplary: you feel the hand of a natural at work, one whose command of tone is strong, and who has an instinctive feel for handling a story." Writing in The Telegraph of London, reviewer Sinclair McKay calls the novel "a dark, gripping, often comic novel concerning appetite, urban poverty and identity."

Heliopolis was listed as one of the final dozen nominees for the 2009 Man Booker Prize. Hilary Mantel's Wolf Hall ultimately won.
