= James Scudamore (author) =

British author (born 1976)

- Born: 19 May 1976 (age 50)
- Education: Christ Church, Oxford; University of East Anglia
- Known for: Award winning author
- Spouse(s): Rose Grimond (married 2007)

James Scudamore (born 19 May 1976) is a British author.

== Books ==
Scudamore's first novel The Amnesia Clinic won the 2007 Somerset Maugham Award and was shortlisted for the Costa First Novel Award, the Commonwealth Writers' Prize, the Glen Dimplex Award and the Dylan Thomas Prize. It was described by Hilary Mantel as "A wonderful debut – witty, polished, fluent and effortlessly entertaining" and by the judges of the Costa Award as a "delightful book ... full of tall tales and fantasy".

His second novel, Heliopolis, was published in 2009. Writing in The Guardian newspaper, Henry Shukman commented that "In his second novel, set in contemporary São Paulo, Scudamore does not embed a transplant from his own culture in foreign soil. Instead he takes the plunge and boldly invests himself in a first-person narrator. The novel is cleverly pitched to explore the two socioeconomic poles of modern urban Brazil. And the writing is exemplary: you feel the hand of a natural at work, one whose command of tone is strong, and who has an instinctive feel for handling a story." The novel was longlisted for the 2009 Man Booker Prize.

Following the publication in 2013 of his third novel, Wreaking, the BBC Today programme interviewed Scudamore inside the grounds of the derelict Severalls Hospital in Colchester, where he explained how visits to such sites, rendered defunct by the Care in the Community Act, had directly inspired the book. The novelist Alan Warner described Wreaking as "an immersion in the physical and psychic ruins of a contemporary Britain which enchants and disturbs, lures and repels".

In 2014, Scudamore was invited to ghostwrite a memoir of James Joyce's grandson and literary executor Stephen James Joyce, who subsequently changed his mind. As of 2024, Scudamore was said to be "working on a novel about the descendant of a famous writer."

English Monsters is Scudamore's fourth novel and was published in 2020. It depicts the effects of physical and sexual abuse at a boarding prep school on a group of friends over a thirty-year period. Edward Docx wrote of this "dark, tender, troubling novel" that "it is impossible to read these pages and not to think of the present blight of emotionally cauterised boarding-school politicians whose various pathologies, fantasies and defence mechanisms Britain must continue to endure."

== Biography ==
Scudamore grew up in Japan, Brazil and the UK, and is a graduate of Christ Church, Oxford and of the University of East Anglia. He is married to Rose Grimond, the granddaughter of the Liberal politician Jo Grimond. He has taught at the University of East Anglia, the City University of Hong Kong, and is on the faculty of the International MFA in Creative Writing and Literary Translation at Vermont College of Fine Arts.
