= Ondaatje =

Ondaatje may refer to:

- Christopher Ondaatje (1933-2026), Sri Lankan born Canadian-English businessman, philanthropist, adventurer, and writer
- Kim Ondaatje (born 1928), Canadian painter, photographer, and filmmaker
- Michael Ondaatje (born 1943) Sri Lankan-born Canadian novelist and poet
- Pearl Ondaatje, Sri Lankan radio personality
- Quint Ondaatje (1758–1818), Dutch patriot and politician

== See also ==
- 6569 Ondaatje
- Ondaatje Letters
- Ondaatje Prize
