= State of Deseret =

Provisional U.S. state founded by Mormons (1848–1850)

- 1849–1850
- Flags of the State of Deseret

- The boundaries of the provisional State of Deseret (orange with black outline) as proposed in 1849. Modern state boundaries are underlaid for reference.
- Status: Unrecognized U.S. state
- Capital: Salt Lake City
- Common languages: English: Deseret alphabet (limited)
- Religion: Christianity (The Church of Jesus Christ of Latter-day Saints)
- Government: Theodemocracy
  - Governor: Brigham Young
  - Lieutenant Governor: Heber C. Kimball
- History
  - Established: 1849
  - Disestablished: 1850
Preceded by	Succeeded by
Centralist Republic of Mexico	Utah Territory
- Today part of: United States: Arizona; California; Colorado; Idaho; Nevada; New Mexico; Oregon; Utah; Wyoming

The State of Deseret (/ˌdɛzəˈrɛt/ DEZ-ə-RET, Deseret alphabet: 𐐔𐐯𐑅𐐨𐑉𐐯𐐻) was a proposed U.S. state promoted by leaders of the Church of Jesus Christ of Latter-day Saints who had founded settlements in what is today the state of Utah. A provisional state government operated for nearly two years in 1849 to 1850, but was never recognized by the United States government. The name Deseret is derived from the word for "honeybee" in the Book of Mormon.

== History ==
=== Proposed concept as territory, then state ===
When members of the Church of Jesus Christ of Latter-Day Saints (Mormon pioneers) settled in the Salt Lake Valley near the Great Salt Lake in 1847 (then part of the Centralist Republic of Mexico), they wished to establish a government that would be recognized by the United States.

Initially, second LDS Church president Brigham Young intended to apply for status as a territory and sent John Milton Bernhisel to Washington, D.C. with a petition for territorial status. Realizing that California and New Mexico were applying for admission as states, Young changed his mind and decided to petition for statehood.

Realizing that they did not have time to follow the usual steps toward statehood, Young and a group of church elders formed a convention in the capital town of Salt Lake City, where they quickly drafted and adopted a state constitution on March 6, 1849. It was based on that of Iowa, a state through which the Mormons had passed, with some having temporarily settled there. The bicameral state legislature had 17 senators in its upper chamber and 35 representatives in its lower chamber, all free white male citizens. The state government also had an elected governor, a lieutenant governor and a supreme court. However, the state constitution was silent on the issue of slavery, which was tearing the nation apart in the 1850s. The state constitution took effect on May 10.

The government sent the legislative records and constitution to Iowa for printing because no printing press existed in the Great Basin. They then sent Almon W. Babbitt with a copy of the state's formal records and constitution to meet with Bernhisel in Washington, D.C. and to petition for statehood rather than for territorial status.

=== Geography of the proposed state ===
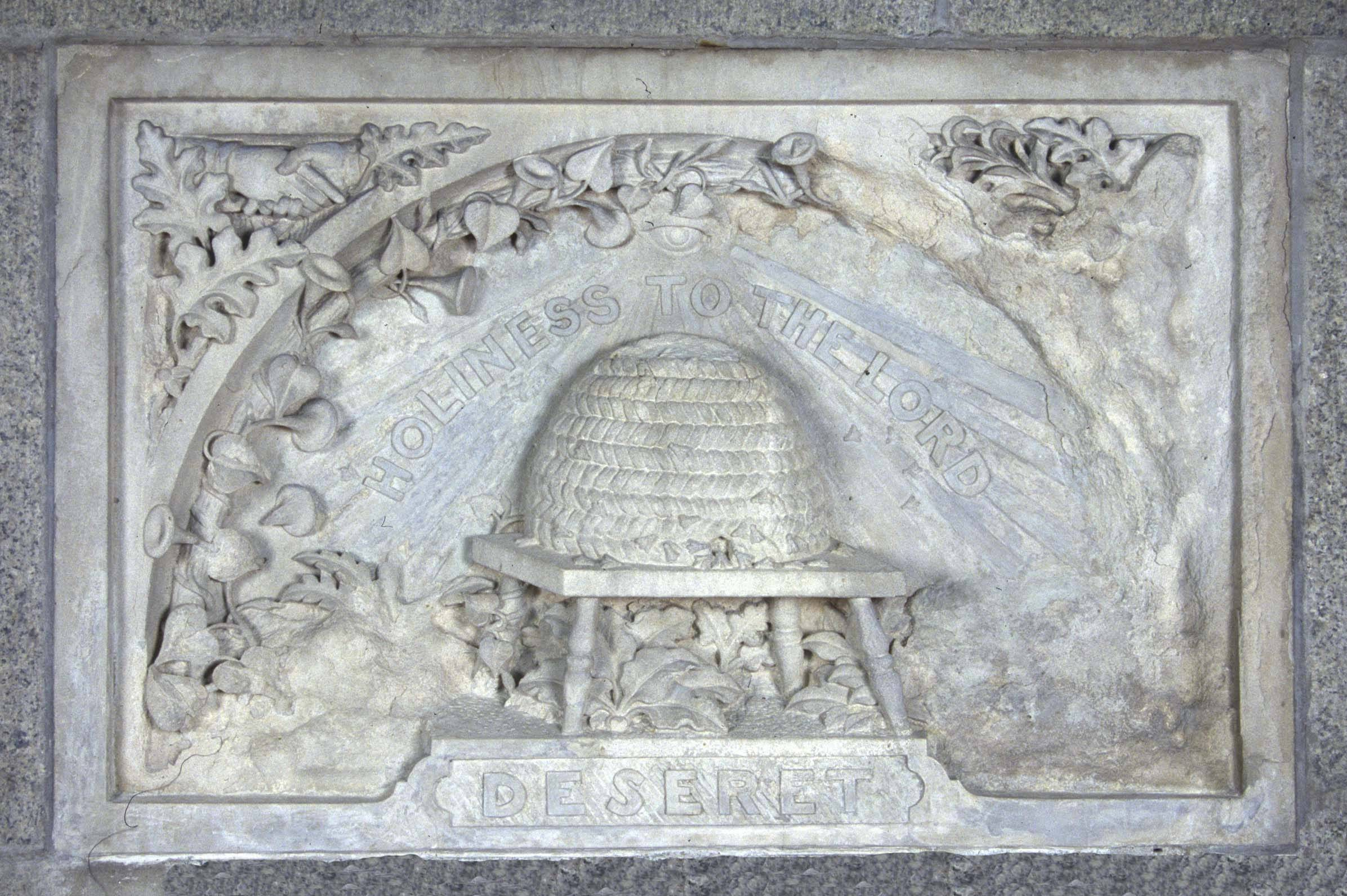
The Deseret Stone used in the construction of the Washington Monument. The stone was donated by the territory in 1853 to represent the provisional state.

The provisional state encompassed most of the territory that had been acquired from Mexico the previous year as the Mexican Cession.

The Territory of Deseret would have comprised roughly all of the lands between the mountain ranges of the Sierra Nevada in the west and the Rockies to the east, and between the initial southern border with Mexico and northward to include parts of the Oregon Territory (recently split along the 49th parallel of latitude by treaty with the British further north in western Canada), as well as the coast of southern California south of the Santa Monica Mountains (including the existing settlements, missions and pueblos of Los Angeles and San Diego). This included the entire watershed of the upper Colorado River (excluding the lands south of the 1854 new second border with Mexico), after the borderline Gadsden Purchase of 1854, as well as the entire area of the central Great Basin. The proposal encompassed nearly all of present-day Utah and Nevada, large portions of eastern California along with Arizona and parts of western Colorado and New Mexico, southern Wyoming and Idaho, along with southeastern Oregon.

The proposal was crafted specifically to avoid disputes that might arise from existing settlements of White Americans. At the time of its proposal, the existing population of the Deseret area, including Southern California, was sparse, since most of the California settlement had been in the northern California gold rush areas of 1848–1849 around San Francisco Bay and Sacramento, areas not included in the provisional state. The border with New Mexico did not reach the Rio Grande, an intentional decision to avoid becoming entangled in the disputes of the western and northwestern borders of Texas after the former Republic of Texas was admitted as the 28th state in 1846. Deseret also avoided encroaching on the fertile Willamette Valley further north in western Oregon, which had been heavily traveled and settled by legions of wagon trains since the 1840s with the famous Oregon Trail. Planners utilized "a map drawn by cartographer Charles Preuss (1803–1854), and published by order of the United States Senate in 1848." This map was drawn by Preuss based on survey data from famous military officer and Western explorer John C. Frémont (1813–1890), and published in 1848.

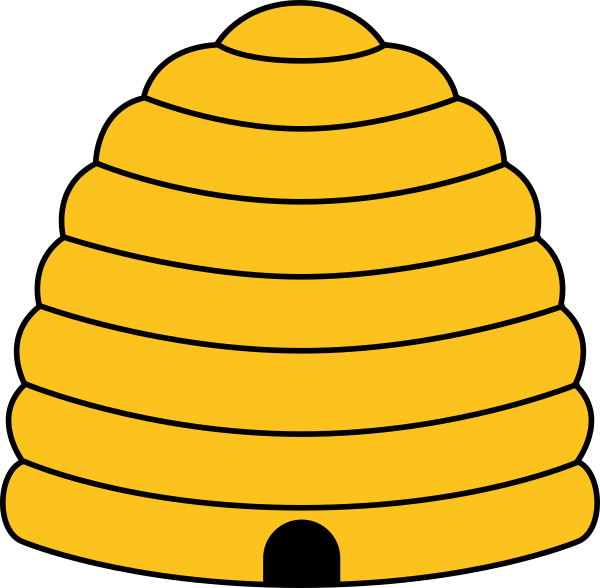
The beehive symbol often associated with Deseret.

As the proposal encompassed lands largely considered inhospitable for cultivation, it was hoped that Deseret might avoid conflict over the issue of the expansion of slavery. Its size would make it easier to preserve the balance of power in the Senate, by decreasing the number of free states entered into the Union. However, the proposal for the state was seen as too ambitious to succeed in Congress, even setting aside controversy over the Mormons and the rumored but not yet publicly acknowledged practice of polygamy.

=== Political context for creation of Utah Territory ===
The California Constitutional Convention debates of 1849 in Monterey, California mentioned the Mormons or Salt Lake a number of times along with the continuing and intensifying North–South political, social and economic conflict over the extension of slavery into the western territories of the United States. Advocates of smaller boundaries for the new 31st state to the east (such as the longitude meridian line of 116° west or the crest of the Sierra Nevada range of the western Rocky Mountains) argued that the Mormons were unrepresented at the constitutional convention, culturally different and apparently planning to apply for their own territorial government to be formed further to the east. They also argued that the Great Salt Lake was too distant for a single territorial or state government to be practical and that Congress would not agree to such a large state (after the controversy over boundaries five years earlier with the admission of the Republic of Texas as the 28th state in 1846). California delegates advocated retention of all of the Centralist Republic of Mexico's former province along the Pacific Ocean coast of Alta California (Upper California) from the Mexican Cession of Mexico's northwestern territories in the peace treaty following the defeat in the Mexican–American War of 1846—1849. It resulted in extensive lands acquired in the current Southwestern United States.

With congressional action regarding Upper California's boundaries and status soon approaching, the provisional government to the east of Deseret sent Mormon apostle Amasa Lyman, and John Wilson, a federal Indian agent in California, as a delegation to the interim government of California, then situated in the temporary capital of the coastal ocean town of Monterey. The delegates sought to call a new statehood constitutional convention and include Deseret in the new state to settle the slavery question throughout the vast territory acquired from Mexico. However, the newly elected first governor of California, Peter H. Burnett, rejected the proposal on the basis that the community in the Great Salt Lake area was too far east beyond the Sierra Nevada mountains and Great Basin Desert (in future Nevada) to combine under a single western government, even temporarily.

The Utah Territory is shown in blue, while the proposed State of Deseret is outlined by the dotted line. Modern state boundaries underlaid for reference.

On September 9, 1850, as part of the negotiated Compromise of 1850, the new Utah Territory was created by an act of Congress, encompassing a portion of the northern section of the earlier proposed state of Deseret. The slavery question would be decided by a voting referendum of the territory's residents.

=== Lingering impact after territorial incorporation ===
The beehive symbol used on Utah's state route shield.

On February 3, 1851, Brigham Young was inaugurated as the first governor of the Utah Territory. On April 4, 1851, the General Assembly of Deseret passed a resolution to dissolve the state. On October 4, 1851, the Utah territorial legislature voted to reenact the laws and ordinances of the state of Deseret.

After the establishment of the Utah Territory, the Mormons did not relinquish the idea of a state of Deseret. From 1862 to 1870, a group of Mormon elders under Young's leadership met as a shadow government after each session of the territorial legislature to ratify the new laws under the name of the State of Deseret. Attempts were made in 1856, 1862 and 1872 to write a new state constitution under that name, based on the new boundaries of the Utah Territory.

The idea of creating a secular American political state based on the religious tenets of Mormonism began to weaken, especially after the advent of the transcontinental railroad, which made the territory available to many non-Mormon settlers, particularly in the western areas of the territory. Young and the church leaders supported the massive construction project of the east–west railroad, even reassigning workers from the monumental Salt Lake Temple to work on the Central Pacific Railroad heading east from the Pacific Ocean to the Rocky Mountains to link with the Union Pacific Railroad driving westward from Missouri and Nebraska. The legendary driving of the famous golden spike just 66 miles northeast from the Great Salt Lake completed the first transcontinental railroad across North America at Promontory Summit in the Utah Territory in May 1869, two decades after its establishment.

== Government ==
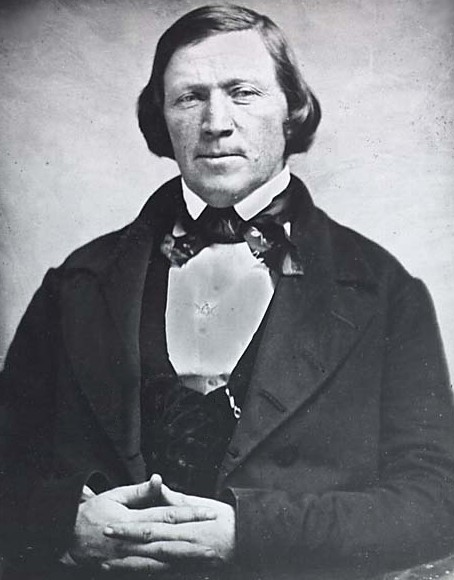
Governor Brigham Young was appointed to office by President Millard Fillmore in 1850.

Prior to the establishment of Utah Territory, in the absence of other authority, the provisional government of Deseret became the de facto government of the Great Basin. Three sessions of its General Assembly, a bicameral state legislature, were held. In 1850, the legislature appointed judges and established a criminal code. Taxes were established on property, and liquor and gambling were outlawed. The LDS Church was incorporated and a militia, based on the earlier Nauvoo Legion (from Nauvoo, Illinois, where the Mormon pilgrims were formerly centered), was formed.

The legislature initially formed six counties that covered only inhabited valleys. These counties initially encompassed only a small portion of the area of Deseret and were expanded as settlement grew.

== Flags ==
According to most descriptions, the Deseret flag was similar to the historic Utah state flag. However, it was not standardized, and several other secular and religious alternatives were used. Variants similar to the American flag were also reported.

A modern attempt to recreate an unofficial flag used by the LDS Church, based on an 1877 description by Don Maguire

Deseret flag as depicted by the flag atop Ensign Peak and created by the LDS Church.

Remake of one of the flags that flew at Pikes Peak, Colorado during the Pioneer Day Celebration on July 24, 1856

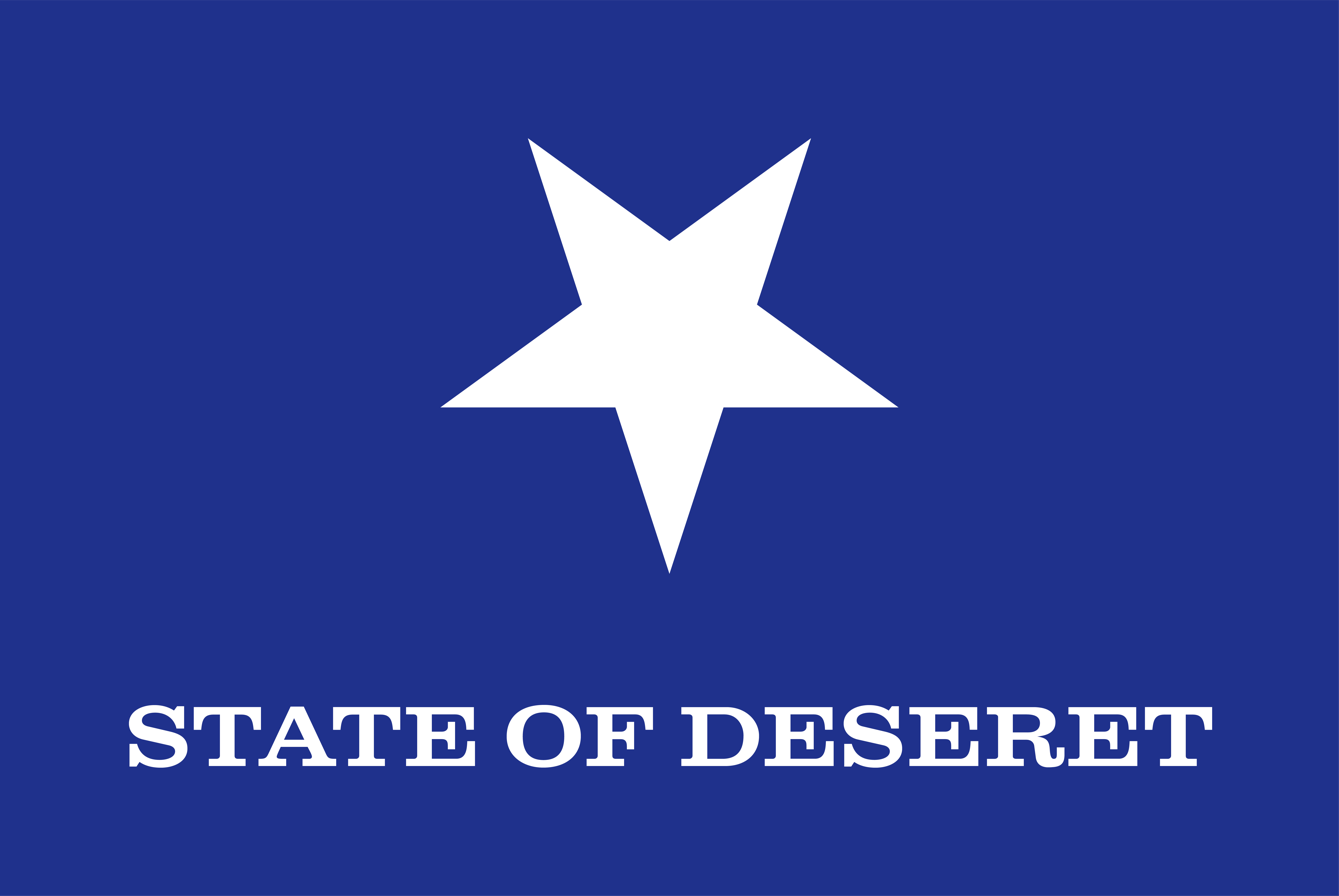
Recreation of a flag that flew on a building in Salt Lake City on July 4th, 1855

Reconstruction of a flag, as described in contemporary newspapers

== Deseret in fiction ==
- In Ward Moore's 1953 alternate history novel Bring the Jubilee, set in an alternate timeline reality where the Confederacy won the U.S. Civil War and the United States in the North became a corrupt and dysfunctional rump state, Deseret is mentioned as the only prosperous state in the Union's Far West (where polygamy is still practiced).
- In the Car Wars board game first published in 1980 (and fiction set in its near-future alternate universe), Utah secedes from the U.S. under the name the Republic of Deseret in the aftermath of a second Civil War, but eventually agrees to rejoin as an "autonomous region". More specific details are provided in Volume Seven: Mountain West of The AADA Road Atlas and Survival Guide. According to the Car Wars Sixth Edition first published in 2020, this will happen in 2065.
- In Harry Turtledove's Southern Victory series of post-Civil War alternate fiction books, published 1997 to 2007, the Mormons of Utah attempt to secede from the United States as Deseret during the supposed Second Mexican War and the First and Second Great Wars. This results in the LDS Church being banned by that futuristic U.S. government.
- In Paradox Interactive's grand strategy game Victoria II, as well as its sequel, Victoria 3, Deseret is a formable nation that may gain independence from Mexico or the United States.
- In Francis Spufford's 2023 alternative history novel Cahokia Jazz, Deseret is an independent republic, negotiating for admission to the Union in the slightly different 1920s.
- In Ryan McBeth's 2025 alternative history book series The Last Republic, Deseret finds itself at the center of a global conflict, its survival threatened by the world's only remaining superpower: the United States.

== See also ==
- Council of Fifty
- Deseret alphabet
- Deseret News Publishing Company
- Deseret Book Company
- Deseret News
- Deseret Ranches
- Territories of the United States
- Territorial evolution of the United States
- List of United States territories that failed to become states
- Mormon colonies in Mexico
- Mormon corridor
- Theodemocracy
- Utah War (1857–1858)

== Works cited ==
- Allen, James B. and Leonard, Glen M. The Story of the Latter-day Saints. Deseret Book Co., Salt Lake City, UT, 1976. ISBN 0-87747-594-6.
- Crawley, Peter (Fall 1989). "The Constitution of the State of Deseret". BYU Studies. 29 (4): 7–22. JSTOR 43041402.
- Leonard, Glen M. (1992), "The Mormon Boundary Question in the 1849–50 Statehood Debates", Journal of Mormon History, 18 (1): 114–136, archived from the original on April 14, 2012.
- 4th of July "CELEBRATION OF THE ANNIVERSARY OF AMERICAN INDEPENDENCE, AT GREAT SALT LAKE CITY, UTAH TERRITORY" Historical Department journal history of the Church 1855 July-September, LDS archives. Page 15
- "PIKE'S PEAK" Historical Department journal history of the Church 1856 May-September, LDS archives. Page 409
