= The Cat's Table =

2011 novel by Michael Ondaatje

- Author: Michael Ondaatje
- Language: English
- Genre: Bildungsroman
- Publisher: Jonathan Cape; McClelland & Stewart; Random House; Knopf
- Publication date: 25 August 2011 (UK); 30 August 2011 (Canada); 4 October 2011 (USA)
- Publication place: United Kingdom
- Media type: Print (hardcover & paperback), ebook, audiobook
- Pages: 304
- ISBN: 978-0-224-09361-3
- LC Class: PR9199.3.O5 C38 2011
- Preceded by: Divisadero (2007)
- Followed by: Warlight (2018)

The Cat's Table is a novel by Canadian author Michael Ondaatje first published in 2011. It was a shortlisted nominee for the 2011 Scotiabank Giller Prize.

The novel is a coming of age story about an 11-year-old boy's journey on a large ship's three-week voyage. Ondaatje himself went on such a voyage in his childhood, from Sri Lanka to England.

== Synopsis ==
The central character and narrator named Michael, an unaccompanied 11-year-old boy, boards an ocean liner, the Oronsay, in Colombo en route to England via the Suez Canal and the Mediterranean. For meals on board Michael is seated at the "cat's table" (the one furthest from the Captain's table) with other boys Ramadhin and Cassius and other misfit characters. The book follows the adventures of Michael and these boys while they are aboard the Oronsay, and Michael's later perspective as an older man looking back on this boyhood voyage.

== Reception ==
Liesl Schillinger for The New York Times, while noting Ondaatje's appended disclaimer that The Cat's Table is a work of fiction, stated, "So convincing is Ondaatje’s evocation of his narrator’s experience that the reader could easily mistake it for the author’s own". Philip Hensher for The Telegraph was largely positive, writing, "Michael Ondaatje’s impressive new novel, containing dreams and fantasy between a ship’s flanks. It is, in the most etymological way, a wonderful novel: one full of wonders." Adam Mars-Jones was less impressed, writing in his review in The Observer, "Perhaps The Cat's Table aspires to a … doubleness of texture and meaning, the yarn of adventure story backed with the deeper colours of adult experience, but on the level of craftsmanship it doesn't measure up." Jess Row, writing for New York Magazine, described The Cat's Table as being unlike Ondaatje's earlier works, as it allows the reader to experience what's going on in the characters' heads, not strictly focusing on the setting of the world.
