= Red Plenty =

2010 book about USSR economics

- Author: Francis Spufford
- Language: English
- Publisher: Faber and Faber
- Publication date: 2010

Red Plenty is a 2010 book by Francis Spufford on the Soviet economy of the 1950s and 1960s. A mix of history and fiction, the book approaches this topic through the viewpoints of more than a dozen characters (some based on real people, some wholly fictional), interspersed with essays (and ending with 53 pages of endnotes, including references to Michael Ellman's Planning Problems in the USSR). Most of the characters are involved in efforts to make the Soviet economy function better.

== Selected characters ==
- Nikita Khrushchev
- Galina, a student and Komsomol member
- Zoya Vaynshteyn, a biologist
- Vasily Nemchinov, an economist
- Sergey Lebedev, a computer scientist
- Sasha Galich, a writer
- Maksim Maksimovich Mokhov, a Gosplan bureaucrat
- Chekuskin, a black market middleman

== Reception ==
Red Plenty received generally positive reviews. In The Guardian, James Meek wrote that "Spufford invests his characters with loves, joys, whimsy and weakness and puts them in believable worlds," though the book's economic descriptions could be hard to follow. In The New York Times, Dwight Garner praised its "vivid" prose and lively characterization, though he added that it was weighed down by too much economic analysis in its second half. Analyzing the book through the generic lense of speculative fiction, Adam Roberts lauded it as a fascinating speculation on whether efforts to reform Soviet central planning could have worked, a "useful corrective" to " right-wing SF of Randian or Heinleinian provenance," and a "brilliant intervention into utopian discourses."

Writing in The Marx and Philosophy Review of Books, Philip Cunliffe offered a more measured verdict: "Spufford’s reflections on the possibility and nature of utopia – perhaps the most alluring aspect of the book, a question both charming and utterly serious – is held back by the undertow of his cynicism and anti-Marxism." A review in Socialist Worker argued that Spufford failed to distinguish between "Joseph Stalin’s bureaucratic nightmare" and "the dynamic socialist democracy the Bolsheviks had set out to create in 1917." On the other side of the political spectrum, a review in the Cato Institute's journal Regulation praised the book as a sympathetic but unsparing portrait of the Soviet economy's unavoidable contradictions.

The book was shortlisted or longlisted for the BSFA Award, the Orwell Prize, and the Ondaatje Prize.
