= Cato, a Tragedy =

1712 play by Joseph Addison

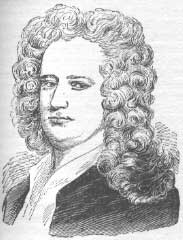
- Joseph Addison
- Original language: English
- Written by: Joseph Addison
- Genre: Tragedy

Premiere
- Date: 14 April 1713
- Place: Theatre Royal, Drury Lane

Cato, a Tragedy is a verse drama in blank verse written by Joseph Addison in 1712 and first performed on 14 April 1713. It is based on the events of the last days of Marcus Porcius Cato Uticensis (better known as Cato the Younger; 95–46 BC), a Stoic whose deeds, rhetoric and resistance to the tyranny of Julius Caesar made him an icon of republicanism, virtue, and liberty. Addison's play deals with many themes such as individual liberty versus government tyranny, republicanism versus monarchism, logic versus emotion, and Cato's personal struggle to hold to his beliefs in the face of death. The play has a prologue written by Alexander Pope and an epilogue by Samuel Garth.

Premiering at the Theatre Royal, Drury Lane the original cast featured Barton Booth as Cato, Theophilus Keene as Lucius, John Mills as Sempronius, Robert Wilks as Juba, Colley Cibber as Syphax, George Powell as Portius, Lacy Ryan as Marcus, John Bowman as Decius, Anne Oldfield as Marcia and Mary Porter as Lucia.

The play was a success throughout England and its possessions in the New World as well as Ireland. Frederick, Prince of Wales put on a production at Leicester House on 4 January 1749 to promote his own support for English liberty against the supposed tyranny of his father, George II of Great Britain. The cast featured four of Frederick's children, including the future George III, who spoke a specially-written prologue, which included the line "What, tho' a boy? it may with pride be said / A boy in England born, in England bred" to contrast to George II's German birthplace.

The play continued to grow in popularity, especially in the American colonies, for several generations. Indeed, it was almost certainly a literary inspiration for the American Revolution, being well known to many of the Founding Fathers. George Washington, for example, attended a performance of Cato with his officers while encamped at Valley Forge with the Continental Army in 1778. It is also believed to have inspired Nathan Hale’s famous quote: “I only regret, that I have but one life to lose for my country.” It is known that Nathan Hale, a resident of Coventry Connecticut, attended Yale and graduated class of 1773 with First Honors. He was an avid reader and also helped to create Yale’s first library. Because it was first printed in 1713 and very popular at the time of The American Revolution, it is quite likely that Yale would have had a copy of Addison’s Cato in its library, making it a likely source of Hale’s quote.

== Plot ==
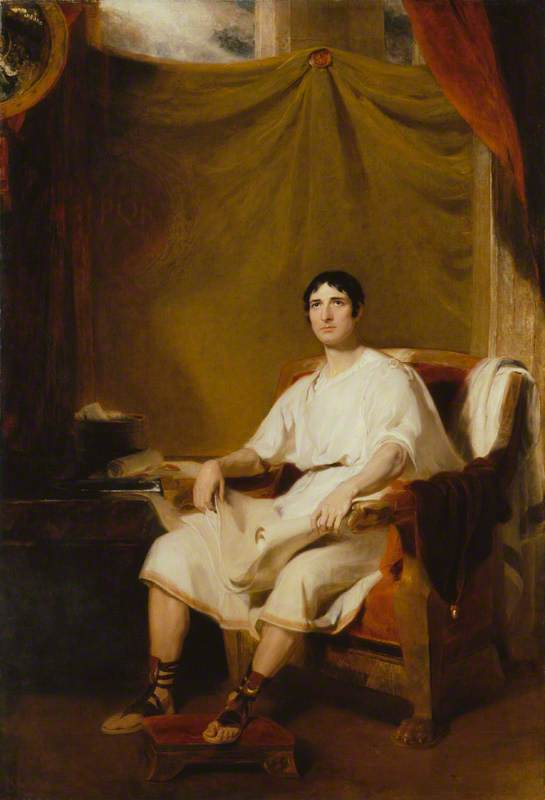
John Philip Kemble as Cato by Thomas Lawrence, 1812.

During the final years of Caesar's Civil War, the remnants of the Roman senate, led by Cato the Younger, have fled from Caesar's legions to Utica, Tunisia. In Cato's court are his twin sons Marcus and Portius, his daughter Marcia, the exiled Numidian prince Juba (an ally of Cato whose father, Scipio, Caesar killed in the battle of Thapsus), Juba's servant Syphax, and the senior senators Sempronius and Lucius.

The play opens as Marcus and Portius praise their father's bravery and reassure one another that he will prevail over Caesar. The senator Sempronius arrives and pretends to agree with them but reveals to the audience that he resents Cato for refusing his requests to marry Marcia and plans to betray him to Caesar in exchange for Marcia's hand. Sempronius persuades Syphax to join his cause and urges him to persuade Juba to marshal the Numidian armies he has brought to Utica and overthrow Cato. Syphax goes to Juba and tries to turn him against Cato, but Juba rebuffs him and insists he will never betray Cato, who he says is like a second father to him. He declares that he is in love with Marcia and wants to seek Cato's favor to marry her.

Syphax complains that Juba's idolatry of Cato and Marcia has blinded him to reasonable advice and leaves. Juba finds Marcia cavorting with her friend Lucia and flirts with her, but she scolds him for being distracted by romantic fantasies during a dire crisis. He apologizes and leaves to tend to his Numidian armies, resolving to try to win her over later. Lucia chides Marcia for spurning the advances of the rich and handsome prince and confesses that she herself is in love with Portius and that they are eloping. Marcia sympathizes with her but warns her that Marcus loves her as well, and his jealousy will drive the brothers apart forever if he finds out about Lucia and Portius' relationship. She beseeches Lucia to hold her tongue until the war is won, lest she create more chaos in Cato's house.

In the senate chamber at Utica, Cato calls a meeting of the few remaining Roman senators and asks for a plan to defeat the rapidly-advancing Caesar. Sempronius calls for war, arguing that it is time for Rome to avenge the deaths of Scipio and others with fire and fury. Lucius pleads for peace and states that enough blood has been needlessly shed and that it is time for Rome to yield to Caesar. Cato states that both are half right but also half wrong and explains that the best course of action is neither too reckless nor too cowardly. He declares that he will continue to fight until Caesar reaches Utica and only then sue for peace. An envoy from Caesar's camp arrives and informs Cato that Caesar has agreed to spare his life if he surrenders Utica immediately. Cato retorts that he will be merciful enough to spare Caesar's life if he surrenders now and stands trial in the senate. He then sends the envoy away.

Juba arrives and praises Cato's strong leadership, prompting Cato to express gratitude for Juba's loyalty. Cato promises to give Juba whatever he wants as repayment for his service when the war ends. Juba shyly asks to wed Marcia, but Cato is affronted by the notion of Marcia marrying a Numidian and storms off. Syphax arrives, and Juba laments that Cato will not consent for him to marry Marcia. Syphax once again urges Juba to marshal the Numidian armies and overthrow Cato, and suggests that once Cato is dead he can take Marcia as his prize. However, Juba vows that he will remain an honorable man and win Cato's favor fairly to marry Marcia. Syphax worries that he will never be able to persuade Juba to turn against Cato.

Marcus, still unaware of Portius and Lucia's affair, comes to Portius and begs him to convince Lucia to wed him. Portius does not reveal his relationship with Lucia to Marcus. However, after the brothers' conversation Portius goes to Lucia and informs her how much grief Marcus is in because of his unrequited love for her. Saddened by this news, Lucia decides to end their affair before it brings any more misfortune to Cato's already-suffering family. Portius returns to Marcus and tells him that Lucia feels compassion for him but has sworn off romantic love and cannot be with him, and a heartbroken Marcus pledges that if Lucia will not be his, he will die fighting his father's enemies, rather than live without her. In the Senate, Sempronius grows tired of waiting for Syphax to turn Juba's allegiances, and raises his own mutinous legion to overthrow Cato. He sends them to arrest Cato, but when Cato is confronted, he makes an impassioned speech that moves them to release him.

Sempronius realizes Cato cannot be deposed by troops so loyal to him and resolves to abandon his plot, abscond with Marcia, and leave Utica to join Caesar's legions. He dresses as Juba to gain entry to Marcia's apartments. However, Juba himself finds him first and, realizing his treachery, kills him. Marcia finds Sempronius' body and, believing it to be Juba's by his dress, confesses tearfully that she truly loved Juba all along and weeps for his death. Juba hears her soliloquy and reveals that he is still alive, and they embrace. Meanwhile, Syphax succeeds in marshaling the Numidian armies and attempts to depose Cato himself. However an anguished Marcus, no longer concerned whether he lives or dies, viciously attacks them to defend his father and slays Syphax before being slain himself. Cato learns of all this and condemns Sempronius and Syphax while praising Marcus' bravery. He declares that instead of mourning his son, everyone ought to mourn the fallen Roman Republic, which Marcus died to protect. He then announces that he intends to surrender Utica to Caesar.

Waiting for Caesar's legions to arrive, Cato privately ponders whether or not to fall on his sword before they do. He laments that "the world was made for Caesar," and not for virtuous men. He kills himself, and as he dies, he is discovered by a shocked Marcia and Portius. With his dying breaths, Cato gives Marcia his blessing to marry Juba, who he declares is a Numidian with "a Roman soul." He also gives Portius his blessing to marry Lucia. Portius curses that they live in the kind of "guilty world" that takes the lives of honest people like Cato and leaves villains like Caesar victorious. He declares that the tragic story of Caesar's conquest will stand forever in history as a warning to all nations of the dire cost of civil war.

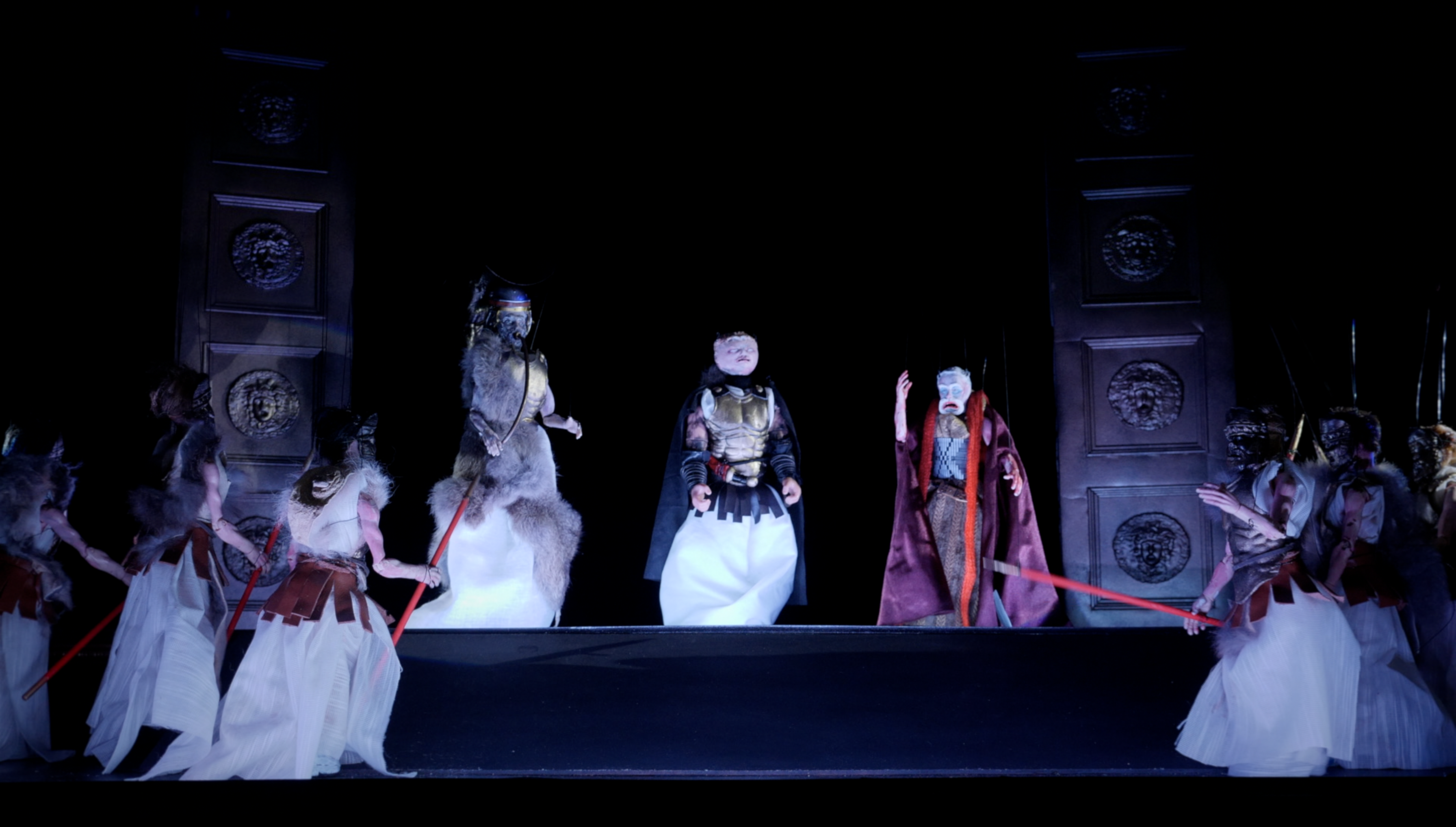
Sempronius stirs up the mob to attack Cato in the insurrection scene of the Addison's play, from the MacMillan Films Staging in 2022

== Later Influence ==
=== Influence on American Revolution ===
Some scholars, including historian David McCullough, the author of 1776, believe that several famous quotations from the American Revolution came from or were inspired by Cato. They include:

- Benjamin Franklin's Articles of Belief and Acts of Religion, November 20, 1728 quotes the Act V opening soliloquy: "...Here I hold - If there be a Pow'r above us (And there is, all Nature cries aloud Thro' all her Works), He must delight in Virtue, And that which he delights in must be Happy."

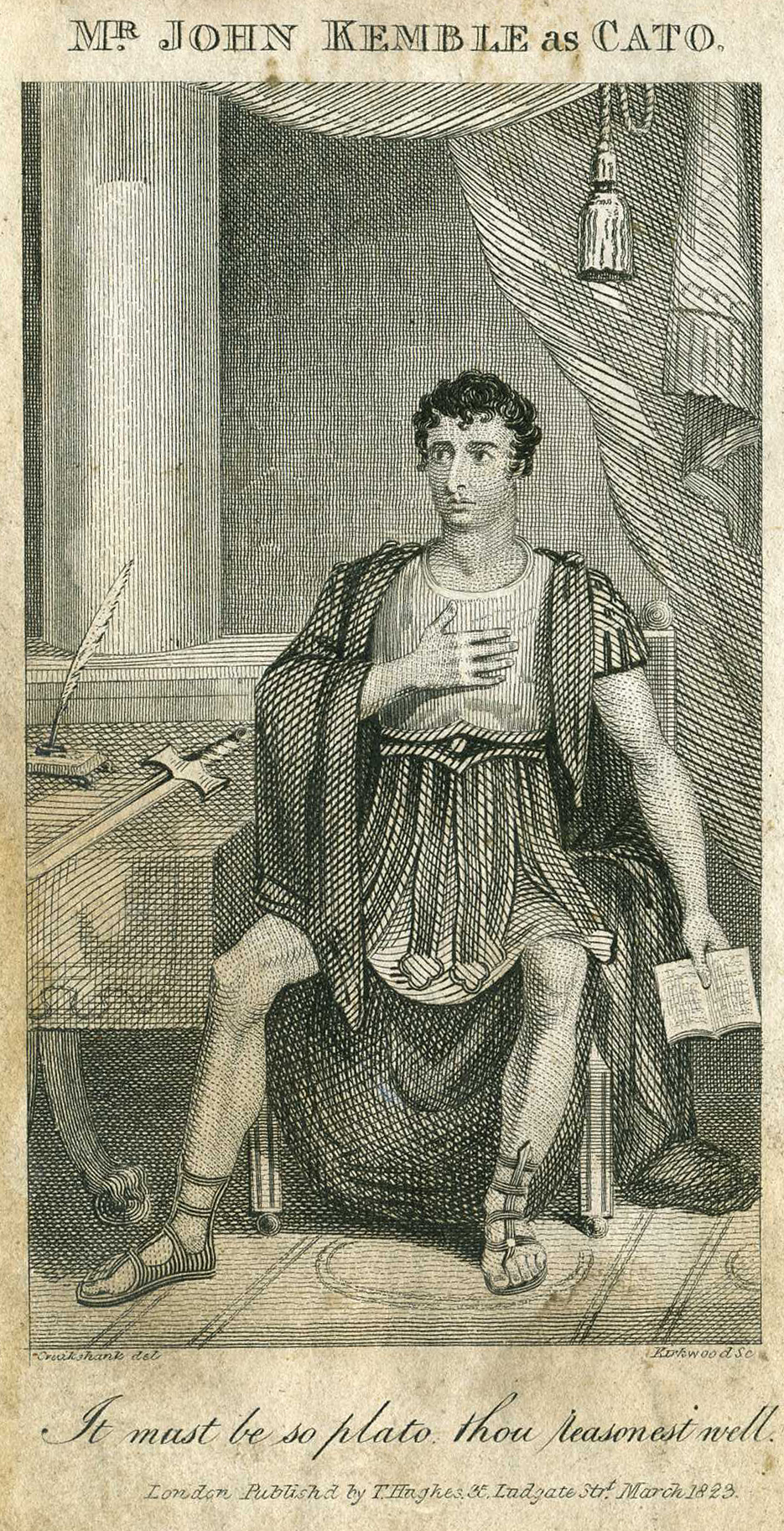
John Kemble as Cato in his revival at Covent Garden in 1816, drawn by George Cruikshank.

Not long after the American Revolution Edmund Burke quoted the play in a Letter to Charles-Jean-Francois Depont, expanded the following year into Reflections on the Revolution in France: "The French may be yet to go through more transmigrations. They may pass, as one of our poets says, 'through many varieties of untried being,' before their state obtains its final form." The quotation is from Cato (V.i. II): "Through what variety of untried being,/Through what new scenes and changes must we pass!".

=== Literature ===
Wilkins Micawber, a character in the 1850 novel David Copperfield by Charles Dickens, quotes Cato from the play: "Plato, thou reasonest well."

A performance of the play, in New York in 1746, is a feature of Francis Spufford's 2016 novel, Golden Hill.
