= Golden Hill (novel) =

2016 novel by English writer Francis Spufford

- Author: Francis Spufford
- Language: English
- Genre: Historical fiction
- Set in: New York City in 1746
- Publisher: Scribner
- Publication date: 2016
- Publication place: United Kingdom
- Pages: 320
- Awards: Costa Book Award (first novel); Ondaatje Prize
- ISBN: 978-1501163876

Golden Hill is a 2016 novel by the English writer Francis Spufford. It won the Costa Book Award for a first novel, and the Ondaatje Prize. As explained in its acknowledgements, it is heavily influenced by The Adventures of David Simple by Sarah Fielding and Joseph Andrews by her brother Henry Fielding.

The novel follows a mysterious British traveller named Mr Smith who arrives in New York City in 1746 and upends the lives of the merchant and political classes.

== Plot ==
In early November 1746 a traveller called Mr Smith arrives in New York, bringing with him a bill for £1000, which he takes to Mr Lovell, a local businessman, who reluctantly agrees to honour it despite Smith refusing to reveal who it is from and how he intends to use it. He meets Lovell's daughters Tabitha and Flora at home and soon afterwards also encounters Septimus Oakeshott, secretary and spymaster to George Clinton, governor of New York. He has his purse stolen and soon afterwards is saved from a murderous mob at a Pope Night bonfire by Oakeshott and his black servant (and lover) Achilles.

Septimus and Smith become friends and the pair begin to plan a production of Joseph Addison's Cato, with the two female roles played by Flora and Tabitha. Smith also tentatively begins wooing Tabitha, discovering her love of theatre and frustrations with the limitations on her life at home. Impressed by the 46-year-old ex-professional actress Euterpe Tomlinson and her recitation at a dinner marking George II's birthday, Smith convinces a reluctant Septimus to give her a part in the play - forgetting until it is too late that this will lose Tabitha her role. Just after rehearsals have begun, Tabitha invites Smith to join her on a return trip to Tarrytown on her father's business. She fails to convince him to stay behind in Tarrytown and instead he accompanies her back to New York. They arrive just after the transatlantic ship expected to bring in the confirmation of his bill but it carries no such confirmation and he is imprisoned for debt and the capital crime of forgery. In gaol Smith writes a letter to his clergyman father, revealing to the reader his escape from the household of "Lord -" and his mixed-raced origin. Another ship then arrives bearing the confirmation of the bill, thus securing his release.

Smith sees Tabitha at a Saint Nicholas Night celebration on 6 December, where she still seems hostile towards him. He also convinces Septimus to take over the role of Sempronius and the production proves a great success. Euterpe appears naked to Smith at a bath-house later that night and - despairing of Tabitha - he encourages and gives in to her seductions. However, the following morning they are discovered in the 69 position at his lodgings by Flora, who had been bringing a letter of reconciliation from Tabitha. Euterpe's husband is Major Tomlinson, part of the Governor's faction, meaning it seems as if Smith has sided with the New York Assembly against the Governor. Septimus challenges Smith to a duel on behalf of the Governor's faction, but secretly reveals during it that he intends merely to humiliate rather than kill his opponent. However, making a final clumsy show of resistance, Smith slips on the ice and fatally severs Septimus' femoral artery.

Chief Justice James De Lancey presides over the ensuing trial, in which Smith's lawyer forces him to blacken Septimus' name by revealing the latter's homosexuality, making false allegations that Septimus had tried to blackmail Smith into sodomy and painting Smith's actions as vengeance against the decadent Governor's faction. This succeeds, meaning Smith is found guilty of manslaughter rather than murder. Guilty at his betrayal of his friend, Smith almost succumbs to a fever and then goes to Septimus' room to reclaim his purse, which Septimus had discovered and kept safe. He then goes to visit Tabitha one last time before his business is concluded, nearly convincing her to come with him until she finally alerts her family in an apparent screaming-fit. Smith immediately leaves town on a sledge with Achilles and a number of enslaved men and women he has bought for his £1000. Two more letters form a coda to the novel, the first explaining to Lovell that Smith had been sent to New York by an abolitionist chapel in London to buy the freedom of a number of enslaved persons with the £1000, whilst the second reveals that the preceding novel is a creation by Tabitha in 1813, attempting to imagine and understand Smith's brief stay in New York.

== Reception ==
Golden Hill was widely praised on publication. Steven Poole in the Guardian commented that "The whole thing ... is a first-class period entertainment, until at length it becomes something more serious." Alexandra Harris, writing for the Daily Telegraph, called it "verifiable gold" and applauded "a novel of gloriously capacious humanity, thick-woven with life in all its oddness and familiarity, a novel of such joy it leaves you beaming, and such seriousness that it asks to be read again and again.". In the Sunday Times, Peter Kemp praised Spufford's "superbly inventive visual responsiveness" and "high-fidelity literary mimicry". In the New York Times, Dwight Garner commended the novel as "a high-level entertainment, filled with so much brio that it’s as if each sentence had been dusted with Bolivian marching powder and cornstarch and gently fried".
