= The Collected Works of Billy the Kid: Left-Handed Poems =

1970 verse novel by Michael Ondaatje

- First edition
- Author: Michael Ondaatje
- Language: English
- Genre: Poetry
- Publisher: Anansi Press
- Publication date: 1970
- Publication place: Canada
- Awards: Governor-General Literary Award - Poetry (1970)
- ISBN: 978-0679767862

The Collected Works of Billy the Kid: Left-Handed Poems is a verse novel by Michael Ondaatje, published in 1970. It chronicles and interprets important events in the life of William Bonney, a.k.a. Billy the Kid, and his conflict with Sheriff Pat Garrett.

== Plot summary ==
The book presents a series of poems not necessarily in chronological order which fictionalize and relate Bonney's more famous exploits, after the end of the Lincoln County War. The narrative includes his relationship with John and Sallie Chisum, his formation of a gang with Tom O'Folliard and Charlie Bowdre, his standoff with Garrett in Stinking Springs, his arrest and escape from Lincoln, New Mexico, his escape and the ensuing murder of James Bell and Robert Olinger, and finally his death at the hands of Garrett.

== Technical and stylistic elements ==
- Makes use of free verse vignettes, mostly from Bonney's perspective, to tell the story.
- The imagery and language is generally dark and compressed, evocative of the suspense and violence that characterizes Bonney's story.
- Ondaatje is quoted as saying: "I didn't want a book that explained him, that was a kind of sociological study of this cowboy or this killer." He achieves this goal by writing much of the book in the first person perspective, from Billy's point of view – this forces the reader to identify, and possibly even empathize with, Bonney's actions and emotions.
- Ondaatje has stated that he first became interested in Westerns as a child in his home country of Ceylon (now Sri Lanka). His characterization of Billy the Kid is largely a reaction against the clichéd "comic book" western heroes he read at the time.

== Publication history ==
The book was written by Ondaatje in the late 1960s in Canada, after he emigrated from Ceylon to England and further emigrated to Canada, where he attended college in Quebec. It was initially published by Anansi Press in 1970, and reprinted in 1979 by Wingbow Press, the printing arm of the now-defunct distributor Bookpeople. Its most recent reprint was in 2009 by Vintage International.

== Critical reception ==
On its release, the volume received largely positive reviews. Most notably, it received the Governor General's Award for English-language poetry in 1970 from the Canadian Arts Council. Karyl Roosevelt also praised the book in the New York Times, calling it "a good little book, carefully crafted and thoroughly literate." In a more sober 1974 review, Phoebe Adams wrote that the book is "[a] bizarre project altogether, accomplished with a sporadic brilliance that merits attention." When the book was given another print in 2009, one reviewer wrote that "'The Collected Works of Billy the Kid' already feels like a modern classic, the book in which a great writer first learned to do a trick with a knife." There was some negative reaction, however. John Diefenbaker, a former Canadian prime minister, was reported to have "hated the award-winning book and called a news conference to denounce it." The publicity of the event helped boost sales, however, and in the end the book is widely acknowledged to be a good first effort. Ondaatje would go on to write another award-winning novel, The English Patient, and several others.

== Adaptation ==
It was staged at St Francis Xavier University, Antigonish, NS in the early 1970s by an amateur group of students, possibly one of the first staging in Canada.

Ondaatje adapted the novel into a play. It premiered in Toronto in multiple times, notably at the Dallas Theater Center, the Stratford Festival and the Toronto Free Theatre. The play has received generally positive critical attention. Before the 1990 run in Toronto, Ondaatje revised his original script to better explore the female characters in the work. He stated that the original work was "a very male book" and that JoAnn, the director of the Tarragon Theatre's Toronto production, "has brought out subtleties [in the female characters] that were hidden – too hidden."

Ondaatje gave permission for the work to be the subject of a new adaptation by English theater director Dan Jemmett in 2007. Originally produced in Pittsburgh, PA, by Quantum Theatre, the new vision was created by the company of five actors and Jemmett. The show was subsequently presented in Madrid, Spain, and Paris, France, at the Théâtre des Bouffes du Nord in 2013.

Ondaatje agreed for the work to be adapted as a chamber opera by the English composer Gavin Bryars, with the libretto made by Jean Lacornerie, who staged the work. It was presented at the two co-commissioning theatres in Lyon, Le Théâtre de la Croix-Rouse and Le Théâtre de la Renaissance, in March 2018 and subsequently toured. The musical performance was directed by Gérard Lecointe, with the French pop singer Bertrand Belin as Billy the Kid and the soprano Claron MacFadden playing all female role.
