= Fassbinder: Thousands of Mirrors =

2023 book by Ian Penman

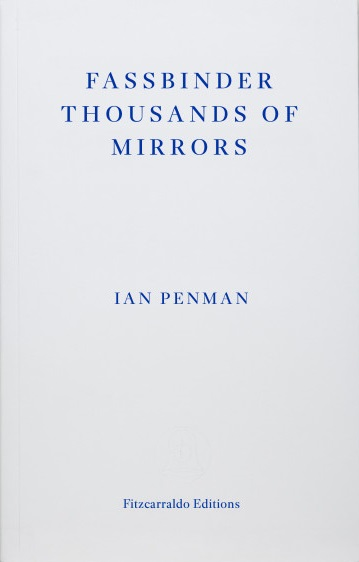
- Author: Ian Penman
- Language: English
- Subject: Rainer Werner Fassbinder
- Publisher: Fitzcarraldo Editions
- Publication date: 19 April 2023
- Publication place: United Kingdom
- Pages: 200
- ISBN: 978-1804270424

Fassbinder: Thousands of Mirrors is a book about the German filmmaker, writer and actor Rainer Werner Fassbinder, written by the English journalist Ian Penman. It was published by Fitzcarraldo Editions in 2023.

== Summary ==
Inspired by Fassbinder's way of working, the book was written in three months and largely consists of fragments and personal reflections. Penman, a music critic, describes how he in the 1980s had a similar relationship to Fassbinder's films as he had to albums by his favourite bands. The book sketches Fassbinder's life story and context within the postwar German society and the New German Cinema.

== Reception ==
Anthony Quinn of The Guardian wrote that Fassbinder's and Penman's stories become intertwined, including their histories of drug use, and that Penman's scepticism to some of Fassbinder's films gives the book complexity.

Time Out selected Fassbinder: Thousands of Mirrors as one of the 15 best books of 2023, calling it a work that provides "a proper sense of how one can really wallow in both Fassbinder's massive body of work and his personal mythology" and "a delightful, emotive and appropriately flashy ode".

The book was joint winner of the James Tait Black Memorial Prize for Biography and won the Ondaatje Prize.
