= Running in the Family (memoir) =

Book by Michael Ondaatje

First edition (publ. McClelland & Stewart)

Running in the Family is a fictionalized memoir, written in post-modern style involving aspects of magic realism, by Michael Ondaatje. It deals with his return to his native island of Sri Lanka, also called Ceylon, in the late 1970s.

It also deals with his family. Much of the focus falls on his father Mervyn Ondaatje and his scandalous drunken antics. Michael's grandmother Lalla is another family member that is explored in detail. Many themes are explored in the lives of his family, particularly luxurious frivolity (especially in the 1920s) and dipsomania. The book often seems to blur the lines of fiction and history by offering diverse accounts of certain incidents and retellings of isolated events about which the author couldn't logically know so many intimate details. It is ultimately about a man's quest to reconcile himself with the father he scarcely knew and come to terms with the loss of not knowing that man. This narrative which locates the writer and his journey towards a father, who is no longer alive, but constantly present in the narrative, is also a story of individual identity and its intersections with a larger identity of a minority community in the country.

Some important themes include: memory (its reliability, importance, and what makes it valuable), assumptions about others, the importance of family, and societal expectations. Another significant extension of the theme of memory is the blurred line between memory and history. History becomes anecdote, the past that is remembered: recollected and recounted, a negotiation with memory and its unreliability. This book also contains many motifs including maps, nature and money. Motifs also include the sensorial dynamics of memory: sounds, smells and colours.

Ondaatje writes, "A literary work is a communal act. [...] I must confess that the book is not a history but a portrait or 'gesture'. [...] In Sri Lanka a well-told lie is worth a thousand facts."

== Significant people mentioned ==
- Michael Ondaatje – The author of the memoir and thus the narrator. He was born in Sri Lanka and, at the time of the recounting, lives in Canada.
- Mervyn Ondaatje – Michael's father; a dipsomaniac. He was also in the Ceylon Light Infantry.
- Lalla – Michael's maternal grandmother. She did not really blossom as a woman until her husband died. She doesn't really care what people think about her. She is ahead of her time and always trying the newest things. She is comfortable lying to people (pg 109) and she is unashamed even though she is poor. She loves the people who love her, she even hid a murderer and helped him escape because she believed he was a good man. She doesn't seem to have a very firm grasp on the concept of reality and what is appropriate. She loves playing practical jokes and messing around with people. As a young woman, she was very promiscuous (page 111). “She could read thunder” (page 113). Serial flower stealer. Had a mastectomy and gets into hijinks involving a fake breast she wears.
- Willie – Lalla's husband. Bought the "Palm Lodge" in the heart of Colombo and began a dairy. He died shortly thereafter, when Lalla was not yet thirty.
- Doris Gratiaen – Michael's mother, she and Mervyn met because her brother was good friends with Mervyn. They were married for fourteen years. She later divorced Mervyn, and he remarried.
- Philip - Michael's grandfather, he owns the rock hill estate.
- Gillian - Michael's sister. She sometimes travels with him during his trips to Sri Lanka/Ceylon.

Other characters include:

- Rene de Saram – Lalla's friend and next door neighbor. Both women "blossom" after their husbands' deaths. This impacts their lives greatly.
- Noel Gratiaen – Doris' brother, Lalla's son.
- Phyllis – One of Michael's aunts.
- Dolly – Another aunt who smokes, and is half deaf, half blind.
- Aelian – Philip's brother.
- Dickie – Lalla's sister whose husband drowned.
- Maureen – Mervyn's second wife, mother of Jennifer and Susan. Mervyn was very different around his second family.
