= The Cinnamon Peeler =

Lyric poem by Michael Ondaatje

First edition (publ. Knopf)

The Cinnamon Peeler is a 1989 selected poetry collection by Canadian writer Michael Ondaatje and the title of a poem included in that collection.

The volume mostly contains poetry from Ondaatje's previous collections, including all of his 1984 volume, Secular Love, and selections from There's a Trick with a Knife I'm Learning to Do (1978) and Elimination Dance (1979).

The title poem originally appeared in Secular Love. It is an erotic love poem addressed by the cinnamon peeler to his wife, using the associations of the smell of cinnamon to explore memory and desire. Ondaatje has said that he wrote it in one shot after carrying out an interview in which his tape recorder failed to work.
