= Chester Playhouse =

Performing arts venue in Nova Scotia

The Chester Playhouse is a not-for-profit performing arts venue located in the village of Chester, Nova Scotia. Operating year-round, the Playhouse presents a program of live theatre, music, film, comedy, and community events. Originally constructed in 1938 as the Kenerik movie house, the building has undergone multiple transformations and restorations, most recently reopening in 2023 following a major fire and extensive rebuild.

== History ==
The building that now houses the Chester Playhouse was originally constructed in 1938 by Ken Corkum and Erik Redden as a movie theatre named the Kenerik. It was a local cinema for many years before transitioning into a live performance venue.

In 1963, the Chester Jesters, a local amateur theatre group led by Dick and Teka Burwell, began producing annual summer theatre productions at the site. These performances involved broad community participation and continued until the early 1970s. After a period of disuse, the building was purchased in 1975 by Leo and Dora Velleman, who renovated it and renamed it the Leading Wind Theatre, after a 19th-century clipper ship. The venue was then used by the Vellemans' company, Canadian Puppet Festivals, until their merger with Mermaid Theatre of Nova Scotia in 1983.

To preserve the venue for the performing arts, the Chester Theatre Council was established in 1984. In 1987, the Council launched the first Chester Summer Festival, presenting touring theatre productions throughout the season. Later that year, the building was purchased by businessman and philanthropist Sir Christopher Ondaatje, who renamed it the Chester Playhouse. In 1992, Ondaatje donated the Playhouse to the Chester Theatre Council.

Substantial renovations were undertaken in 1999 and completed in 2005, including the addition of a two-storey backstage area, upgraded lobbies, and accessible facilities. In 2019, the Chester Playhouse celebrated its 80th anniversary.

In June 2021, during a major renovation project, a fire caused significant damage to the roof and interior of the building. Reconstruction began in 2022, supported by federal, provincial, and community funding, and the Playhouse reopened in 2023 with improved accessibility, acoustics, and technical infrastructure.
