= Judicial System of the State of Deseret =

The Judicial System of the State of Deseret was the legal framework for the provisional government of the proposed State of Deseret. It existed for only two years, when it was outmoded by the newly established territory of Utah, which became an organized incorporated territory of the United States after September 9, 1850. Like its parent state, the Deseret Judicial System was never officially recognized by the United States Government.

== Constitutional text ==
The judiciary of the State of Deseret was created under the Sixth Article of the Constitution of the State of Deseret:

Article VI.

Of The Judicial.

Sec. 1. The judicial power shall be vested in a supreme court, circuit courts, probate courts, and such other courts as the general assembly may, from time to time, establish, which shall have such jurisdiction and exercise such powers as may be prescribed by law.

Sec. 2. The supreme court shall consist of a chief justice and two associate justices, two of whom shall be a quorum to hold courts.

Sec. 3. The supreme judges shall be elected by the general assembly for the term of six years after the first election under this constitution. At said first election one shall be elected for two years, one for four years, and one for six years.

Sec. 4. The judges of the supreme court shall be conservators of the peace throughout, the State, and shall exercise such other jurisdiction and appellate powers as shall be prescribed by law.

Sec. 5. The style of all process shall be "State of Deseret," and all criminal prosecutions shall be "in the name of the State of Deseret."

== Election of the first Deseret Supreme Court Justices ==
Although the text of the Constitution of the State of Deseret indicates that the first election for the Justices of the Supreme Court was to be held on May 7, 1849, all evidence indicates that the Constitution was in fact composed sometime between July 1 and July 18, 1849: the drafters of the Constitution had been tasked with inventing an entire background of procedural history for the Deseret Constitution, including a constitutional convention and an election for the general body of officers for the government of the State of Deseret. The falsified procedural background was presumably taken as a measure that would legitimatize the constitution, and increase the likelihood that the U.S. government would approve Deseret's bid for statehood.

On March 4, 1849, at a time when the Council of Fifty was still intending to petition the U.S. government to make Deseret a territory (it had not yet determined to aim for statehood), the Council delegated Heber C. Kimball as Chief Justice, with Newel K. Whitney and John Taylor as Associate Justices. The public election followed two days later on March 6 when, along with the rest of the slate of positions nominated by the council, the Justices were confirmed by a unanimous vote of 674 in favor.

After the creation of the Supreme Court under the Constitution of the State of Deseret, the lower courts were created by the Deseret general assembly. On January 9, 1850, this legislature created a series of county courts and justices of the peace to serve on the local level.

== Function ==
=== Mormon and non-Mormon usage ===
Although each of the Justices were prominent church leaders in their own right (Kimball was one of the original twelve apostles under Joseph Smith and the First Counselor to Brigham Young in the First Presidency of the church, while Taylor succeeded Brigham Young as the president of the church after Young's death), Mormons living in the State of Deseret were encouraged by church leadership to take their grievances to their immediate ecclesiastical leaders, rather than going through the civil channels. Non-Mormons, on the other hand, relied more heavily on the courts of the State of Deseret, although they too submitted to the church tribunals on occasion.

B. H. Roberts cites Captain Howard Stansbury's recollections of the operation of the court:

Their courts were constantly appealed to by companies of passing emigrants, who, having fallen out by the way, could not agree upon the division of their property. The decisions were remarkable for fairness and impartiality, and if not submitted to, were sternly enforced by the whole power of the community. Appeals for protection from oppression, by those passing through their midst, were not made in vain: and I know of at least one instance in which the marshal of the state was dispatched, with an adequate force, nearly two hundred miles into the western dessert, in pursuit of some miscreants who had stolen off with nearly the whole outfit of a party of emigrants. He pursued and brought them back to the city, and the plundered property was restored to its rightful owner.

=== Execution ===
The State of Deseret Supreme Court ordered the first recorded execution in the settlement that would become Utah: Patsowits, a Ute Indian, was convicted of the murder of an emigrant in Sanpete Valley. Patsowits was executed by garroting, after receiving his last religious rites from Chaplain John Kay and Sheriff James Ferguson.
