= Light Perpetual (Spufford novel) =

2021 novel by Francis Spufford

Light Perpetual is a British novel by Francis Spufford first published in the United States in 2021 by Scribner.

The novel follows the fictionalized lives of five children killed in a Woolworths during a V-2 attack in London in 1944, imagining an alternate universe in which the five children lived. Spufford was inspired to write the novel after walking past a plaque commemorating the deaths of the 168 people who died during the attack. Of those killed 15 were children. However, despite the attack being real, all the names of the children featured in Spufford's novel are completely fictional.

The novel follows twin sisters Jo and Val as well as their classmates Vernon, Ben and Alec, exploring their lives in 15-year intervals beginning in 1949 and ending in 2009.

== Plot ==
In 1944 South London several shoppers go to Woolworths to see new aluminum pans, the first they've seen since the war began. They are instantaneously killed by a V-2 attack.

In an imaginary future in which the attack did not happen children Jo, Val, Alec, Ben and Vern grow up in Bexford, a suburb of London.

Alec marries early to his teenage love, Sandra. He works as a type-setter, but when this part of the industry is automated he retrains as a primary school teacher. He struggles to understand his two sons, and late in life his wife leaves him for their daughter-in-law's father. However Alec eventually comes to terms with the fact that he has done the best he could for his family and community and feels at peace knowing everything comes to an end.

Ben struggles with a mental disorder for much of his life, self-medicating with both prescribed and street drugs. After he is made redundant he meets Marsha, a widowed cafe owner, who helps him get the mental help he needs and eventually falls in love with him. Having only been able to have a functional life later he remains grateful to Marsha and her family for taking him in.

Jo is musically gifted and has synesthesia, seeing colours when music is played. She is eventually part of a successful band and falls in love with the band leader, Ricky, who forces her out when she accidentally becomes pregnant. After years of being strung along by Ricky she moves back to London to be with her sister, falls in love with an American man and has a late-in-life child.

Val falls in love with a neo-Nazi and spends most of her youth with him. Eventually he murders a young student from Pakistan. Val is imprisoned as an accessory to the murder and slowly rebuilds her life after her release, eventually realizing that Mikey, her husband, was gay and his racism and aggression were attempts to deny this part of himself.

Vern spends most of his life dreaming of climbing up the property ladder, scamming whoever crosses his path in order to achieve his ends. While he has periods of success he also goes bankrupt multiple times. During the Great Recession he finally loses everything and is taken in by his daughter Becky. After a year of nursing him back to health she realizes he never thinks of anyone but himself and finally puts him in a care home.

== Reception ==
The Guardian called it "a brilliant, capacious experiment with fiction". The New York Times called it a "vividly imagined novel".
