= Ian Penman =

British music journalist and critic (born 1959)

- Born: 1959 (age 66–67); Wiltshire, England
- Occupations: Music journalist; critic
- Writing career
- Period: 1977–present

Ian Penman (born 1959) is a British writer, music journalist and critic. He began his career as a writer for the New Musical Express in 1977, later contributing to various publications including Uncut, Sight & Sound, The Wire, The Face, and The Guardian. He has published two collections of his essays and articles, plus full-length studies of filmmaker Rainer Werner Fassbinder, for which he won the Ondaatje Prize and the James Tait Black Memorial Prize, and of composer Erik Satie.

== Biography ==
Penman was born in Wiltshire, UK, in 1959. He spent much of his childhood abroad in the Middle East and Africa, returning to Norfolk in 1970. Skipping higher education, Penman began writing for prominent British music magazine the New Musical Express (NME) in the autumn of 1977. Much of Penman's writing reflected his involvement in the nascent post-punk scene developing in London in the late 1970s.

Along with fellow NME writers such as Paul Morley and Barney Hoskyns, Penman developed a style of music criticism influenced by critical theory, philosophy and other art mediums that was often experimental in its prose. With their increasingly esoteric writing standing in contrast to the magazine's more accessible competitors, such as Melody Maker, the NME began to alienate its readership; it is estimated that within several years, the magazine suffered the loss of half its circulation, in large part due to the new direction of Penman and his colleagues.

Penman continued writing intermittently for the NME until 1985, when the magazine began moving in an increasingly commercial direction. He began freelance work for various outlets, including The Face, Arena, the Sunday Times, The Independent, and the New Statesman. In the 1990s, he contributed to The Wire.

In 1998, Serpent's Tail published a compilation of Penman's work entitled Vital Signs: Music, Movies, and Other Mania to positive reviews. Julia Kenna reviewed the book for Rolling Stone, commenting,

Full of contradictions and witty one-liners, Penman uses language as an art form, playing with puns, synonyms, repetition, and punctuation for added effect... Two decades of politics, music and pop culture with a whip-smart wit and wisdom that draws you in and doesn’t let go.

Penman contributed the text to the catalogue of photographer Robert Frank's exhibition Storylines (Tate Modern. 2004). He has also contributed to various publications, such as The Wire, City Journal and the London Review of Books.

Penman published a second collection of essays and articles on music, It Gets Me Home, This Curving Track, in 2019.

In 2023, he published a study of filmmaker Rainer Werner Fassbinder, Fassbinder: Thousands of Mirrors. The book was joint winner of the James Tait Black Memorial Prize for Biography and won the Ondaatje Prize.

In 2025, Penman published a study of composer Erik Satie, Erik Satie Three Piece Suite.

== Influence ==
Penman has been cited as an influence by range of writers and theorists, including Simon Reynolds, Kodwo Eshun, and Mark Fisher. In addition, artists such as Simon Raymonde of Cocteau Twins have cited Penman's writing as an inspiration.

== Books ==
- Vital Signs: Music, Movies, and Other Manias. (1998, Serpent's Tail).
- It Gets Me Home, This Curving Track (2019, Fitzcarraldo Editions)
- Fassbinder: Thousands of Mirrors (2023, Fitzcarraldo Editions)
- Erik Satie Three Piece Suite (2025, Fitzcarraldo Editions)
