= Alexandra Harris =

British writer and academic (born 1981)

Alexandra Harris FRSL
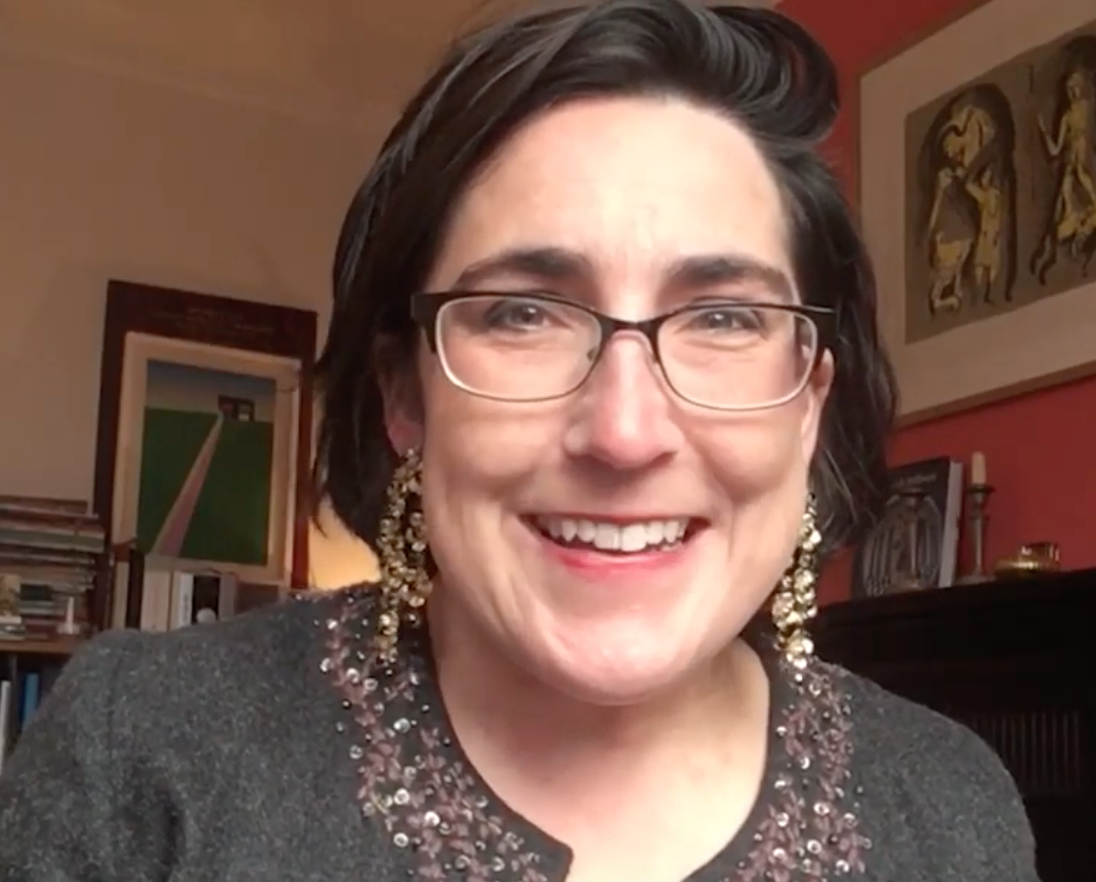
- Harris in 2020
- Born: 1981 (age 44–45); Sussex, England
- Education: Christ Church, Oxford; Courtauld Institute
- Occupations: Writer and academic
- Employer: University of Birmingham
- Website: www.alexandraharris.co.uk

Alexandra Harris FRSL (born 1981) is a British writer and academic. From 2007 to 2017, Harris was a professor in English at the University of Liverpool. In autumn 2017, Harris took up the post of Professorial Fellow at the University of Birmingham. She is the author of books including Romantic Moderns, on modernism in inter-war Britain, and Weatherland on weather in English art and literature. She has also written a short biography of Virginia Woolf published by Thames and Hudson in 2011.

The Rising Down: Lives in a Sussex Landscape was published by Faber in 2024.

== Biography ==
Harris was born in Sussex, England, and read English at Christ Church, Oxford, going on to do an MA at the Courtauld Institute, specialising in modern European Art.

Harris was appointed a Fellow of the Royal Society of Literature in 2014. She was Chair of the judges for the 2020 Forward Prizes for Poetry and has also been a judge for the RSL Ondaatje Prize, the Royal Academy of Arts Wollaston Award, the Authors' Foundation Awards, and the Observer/Anthony Burgess Prize for Arts Journalism.
