= The Rising Down =

2024 book by Alexandra Harris

- Author: Alexandra Harris
- Language: English
- Subject: West Sussex
- Publisher: Faber & Faber
- Publication date: March 2024
- ISBN: 9780571350520

The Rising Down is a book of local history by British author and academic Alexandra Harris. It was published by Faber & Faber in 2024.

== Content ==
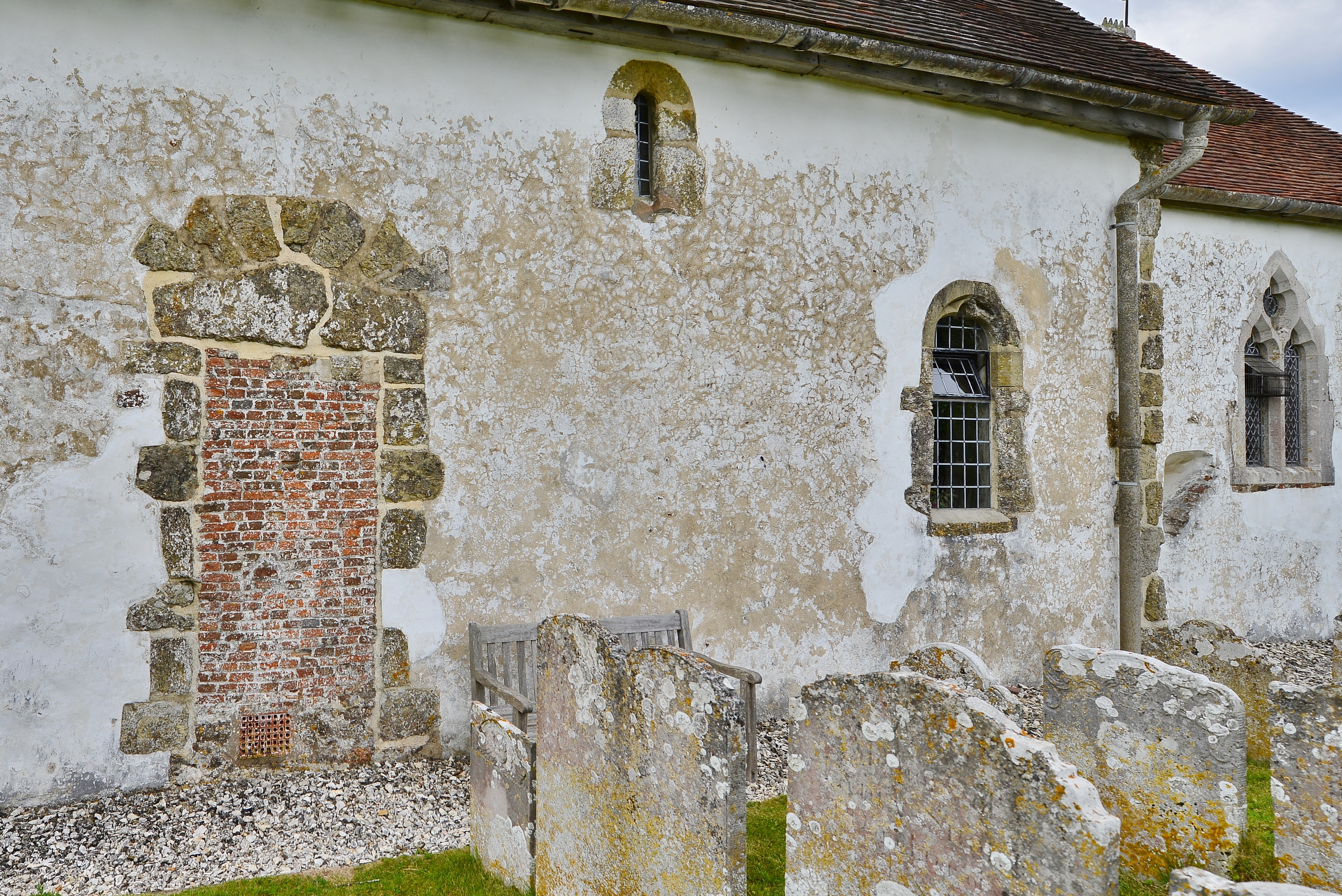
The south wall of St Botolph's Church, Hardham, described in the first chapter, with gash visible on the right-hand side.

In The Rising Down, Harris tells stories of people and places in the area of West Sussex surrounding West Chiltington, the village where she grew up. The topics covered include the anchorites of St Botolph's Church, Hardham, the farmer and brewer Richard Haines, the Baptist minister Matthew Caffyn, the writings of a water bailiff on the river Arun in the 1600s, the stately home Petworth House, and the Chichester townhouse Pallant House.

== Reception ==
In a review for The Guardian, Kathryn Hughes wrote that "throughout this wonderful book, Harris demonstrates that local does not mean minor, nor parochial", and described Harris as "particularly good on the late 17th century and the disturbances wreaked by the civil war." Jasper Rees of The Daily Telegraph called the book a "fascinating, evocative ramble".
