= Coming Through Slaughter =

1976 novel by Michael Ondaatje

- First edition
- Author: Michael Ondaatje
- Cover artist: Coach House Press (design)
- Language: English
- Genre: Historical, Biographical novel
- Publisher: House of Anansi
- Publication date: 1976; 50 years ago
- Publication place: Canada
- Media type: Print (hardback & paperback)
- Pages: 159 pp
- ISBN: 0-88784-051-5
- OCLC: 256760805

Coming Through Slaughter is a novel by Michael Ondaatje, published by House of Anansi in 1976. It was the winner of the 1976 Books in Canada First Novel Award.

The novel is a fictionalized version of the life of the New Orleans jazz pioneer Buddy Bolden and is partly set in Slaughter, Louisiana. It covers the last months of Bolden's sanity in 1907, as his music becomes more radical and his behavior more erratic. A secondary character in the story is the photographer E. J. Bellocq. Both these historical figures are portrayed in ways that draw on their actual lives, but which depart from the facts in order to explore the novel's central theme – the relationship between creativity and self-destruction.

The novel draws on the style of jazz, being structured in a fragmented, and "syncopated" form, with episodes extending in elongated "riffs" before suddenly lurching unpredictably into an apparently unrelated scene. The structure also conveys Bolden's own wild, fragmenting personality, as his schizophrenia takes hold. Bolden's manic, extroverted but self-harming behavior is set against the introverted figure of Bellocq, who expresses his own frustrated desires in his intimate erotic photographs, but then compulsively violates them with scratches.

== Adaptations ==
A theatrical adaptation, written by Ondaatje with Richard Rose and D.D. Kugler, was staged in 1989 by Necessary Angel Theatre. This production received a Dora Mavor Moore Award nomination for Best Original Play, General Theatre in 1990.

In 2006, Variety reported that Ben Ross was adapting Coming Through Slaughter for the screen.
