= Divisadero (novel) =

2007 novel by Michael Ondaatje

- Author: Michael Ondaatje
- Language: English
- Genre: Fiction; Literary fiction
- Publisher: McClelland & Stewart, Knopf
- Publication date: April 17, 2007
- Publication place: Canada
- Pages: 288 pp
- ISBN: 978-0-7710-6872-0 (McClelland & Stewart); ISBN 978-0-307-26635-4 (Knopf)
- OCLC: 81601383
- Dewey Decimal: 813/.54 22
- LC Class: PR9199.3.O5 D58 2007c

Divisadero is a novel by Michael Ondaatje, first published on April 17, 2007 by McClelland and Stewart.

== Synopsis ==
The novel centres on a single father and his children: Anna, his natural daughter; Claire, who was adopted as a baby when Anna was born; and Cooper (Coop), who was taken in "to stay and work on the farm" at the age of four when orphaned. The family lives on a farm in Northern California where Anna and Claire are treated almost as twins, while Cooper is treated more as "a hired hand". After Anna begins a sexual relationship with Coop, an incident of violence tears the family apart. The book then details each of the characters' separate journeys through life post-incident and how they are all interconnected.

Later in her life, Anna moves to France to live in a farmhouse once owned by the French poet Lucien Segura whom she is researching. Meanwhile, Claire works for a law firm in San Francisco while visiting her father on the weekends, and Coop becomes a professional gambler working his way up and down the West Coast of the United States. The second part of the story explores the story of the French poet, which has a number of close parallels to the first part of the story.

== Style and structure ==
The novel starts with Anna as narrator, but some sections have a third person omniscient narrator. It is divided into three parts:

- One: Anna, Claire and Coop
- Two: The family in the cart
- Three: The house in Dému

=== Anna, Claire and Coop ===
This part introduces the family members and their childhood to the reader. It ends with the narration of what made the family break apart: Anna and Coop begin an affair which is discovered by their father who starts beating Coop. Anna, who knows that her father is about to kill Coop, attacks her father. Finally he takes her with him and drives away. A little later, Coop comes to himself and returns to the family's farm house where Claire heals his wounds and he goes away as well.

=== The family in the cart ===
Claire stays with her father who never talked about what happened when Anna and Coop disappeared. She starts working for a lawyer but she still visits her father at the weekends. Anna manages to escape from her father at a rest stop, and eventually moves to France where she researches Lucien Segura. She starts a relationship with her neighbour Rafael who had known the poet. Coop accompanies a group of gamblers and befriends them. After one of them dies, the group divides and Coop starts tuition to become a hustler. They cheat at cards in a game with some gambler rivals and get busted. He terminates his gambling because his reputation is ruined and begins an affair with a woman who turns out to have financial problems with violent guys who want him to win some money with gambling. He refuses. A while later Claire, whom he met a few days before, finds him.

This part also goes back to Rafael's childhood and tells how he and his family met Lucien Segura when they were looking for a new place to live.

=== The house in Dému ===
The last part centers on the story of Lucien's teenage years, and how he got married and how he survived the war. Finally he realizes that the life with his wife was not the life he wanted and he starts out for Dému.

== Themes ==
Ondaatje said in an interview with Ramona Koval that

I think at the age of 16 or 17 we are almost nothing, I really do think that. We don't think that, but if you look back on yourself—God! Myself at 17 was this callow, callow person. What you become 10 years or 20 years later or more is so much more complicated and good and bad and all these things. So for people to make decisions at that age or people who are judged at that age, it's a terrible thing to happen to them, I think.

— Michael Ondaatje, ABC Radio National Book Show, Michael Ondaatje on "Divisadero", 14 May 2007

He goes on to say that he was exploring how strong this nuclear family is, albeit not blood-related, and how "they have to kind of deal with the rest of their lives with this one moment of trauma".

== Reviews ==
- Iyer, Pico (June 28, 2007). "'A new kind of mongrel fiction'". The New York Review of Books. 54 (11): 36–37, 40–41.

== Adaptations ==
In 2011 Ondaatje worked with Daniel Brooks to create a play based on the novel.

== Awards and nominations ==
- 2007: Governor General's Award for English fiction.
- 2007: Scotiabank Giller Prize. Shortlisted
