= Cahokia Jazz =

2023 crime novel by Francis Spufford

- Author: Francis Spufford
- Language: English
- Genre: Crime, alternate history, detective fiction
- Publisher: Faber & Faber (UK), Scribner (US)
- Publication date: 2023
- Publication place: United Kingdom
- Pages: 437

Cahokia Jazz is an alternate-history detective novel by Francis Spufford released in Great Britain in 2023 and the United States in 2024.

== Setting ==
The book is an alternative history set in the city of Cahokia, near present-day St. Louis. In the book's timeline a less deadly strain of smallpox was introduced to the Americas, giving the Native Americans immunity against the other, more deadly, smallpox strains.

During the Colonisation of North America, several Native American tribes allied themselves into a single nation, with Cahokia as its capital. The Cahokians develop a synthetic language called Anopa based on Mobilian trade jargon and convert to Catholicism after encounters with Jesuit missionaries.

Cahokia joins the US Civil War on the side of the Union, fearful that it may otherwise be invaded by Ulysses S. Grant's army as it seeks to progress south via the Mississippi river. As part of the settlement, Cahokia cedes its claim to the state of Mississippi, and agrees to join the United States. The Navajo tribe also join the United States as a state.

The Cahokians allowed the safe passage of the Mormons to Utah, where they established the Republic of Deseret, which did not join the United States.

Alaska remains part of the Russian Empire, and concurrently with the book, is a party in the Russian Civil War.

Cahokia has developed into a multi-ethnic city, with Native Americans making up the majority of the population, Europeans of various ethnicities forming their own communities such as Germantown and Little Italy, and African Americans also having a substantial presence. The city has many features that would be common in the United States in the early 20th century such as a street car system, a thriving jazz scene, a newspaper and a radio station.

== Plot ==
A murder takes place on the roof of a Cahokian government building. The murder seems to mimic an Aztec human sacrifice. Two Cahokia police detectives, Phineas Drummond, a white man and Joe Barrow, a mixed-race Black and Native American man, are assigned to investigate.

== Reception ==
Reviews include those from The Guardian, Los Angeles Times, The New York Times, and The Wall Street Journal.

Cahokia Jazz won the Sidewise Award for Alternate History for novels published in 2023.
