= Christopher Ondaatje =

Canadian-English businessman and philanthropist (1933–2026)

Sir Christopher Ondaatje CBE OC
- Born: 22 February 1933; Kandy, British Ceylon
- Died: 20 July 2026 (aged 93)
- Occupation: Businessman

Sir Philip Christopher Ondaatje (22 February 1933 – 20 July 2026) was a Sri Lankan-born businessman, publisher, philanthropist, adventurer, writer, and Olympic bobsledder who represented Canada. After emigrating to Canada in 1956, he became a successful stockbroker, co-founded the investment firm Loewen Ondaatje McCutcheon, and founded Pagurian Press, which he later sold to the Bronfman family. He also competed for Canada in the four-man bobsleigh at the 1964 Winter Olympics, where his team finished 14th.

Ondaatje left the business world in 1995 and moved to Britain, where he concentrated on philanthropy, exploration, and writing. His books drew on travels in Africa and Asia and included works on Ernest Hemingway, Richard Francis Burton, the Nile, and colonial Ceylon. He was a major benefactor of cultural, educational, geographical, and sporting institutions in Britain and Canada, and the Royal Society of Literature's Ondaatje Prize was named after him. He was appointed Commander of the Order of the British Empire in 2000 and was knighted in 2003 for philanthropy and charitable services to museums, galleries, and societies.

== Background ==
Philip Christopher Ondaatje was born in Kandy, British Ceylon (now Sri Lanka) on 22 February 1933, to Major Mervyn Ondaatje and Doris Gratiaen, a Chetty-Burgher family of Dutch and Indian origin. He first went to S. Thomas' Preparatory School in Kollupitiya as one of its first students, and later went to Blundell's School in the United Kingdom. His name comes from an Indian ancestor called Ondaatchi from Thanjavur, India. After his alcoholic father lost the family fortune, Ondaatje had to leave school a year from graduation.

In 1956, he emigrated to Canada, arriving in Toronto with virtually no money. He quickly began to rebuild the family fortune, becoming a wealthy stockbroker, going on to be one of the three founding members of Loewen Ondaatje McCutcheon. He became a multi-millionaire in the publishing industry by founding the Pagurian Press, which he later sold to the Bronfman family.

He represented Canada in the four-man bobsled at the 1964 Winter Olympics in Innsbruck. Although the first Canadian men's team won gold in the event, Ondaatje's team finished 14th out of 18 teams. He was a member of the Chester Yacht Club in Nova Scotia, where he owned an island with a view of Chester Harbour.

== Philanthropy ==
Ondaatje was a prominent philanthropist; among the institutions he was a benefactor of are, the National Portrait Gallery, The Royal Geographical Society, The Royal Canadian Geographical Society, Somerset County Cricket Club, Blundell's School, the Sir Christopher Ondaatje Devon Cricket Centre at Exeter University, Lakefield College School, the Art Gallery of Nova Scotia and the Chester Playhouse.

The Royal Society of Literature's Ondaatje Prize – and annual award for "a distinguished work of fiction, non-fiction or poetry, evoking the spirit of a place" – is named after Ondaatje, as is the Ondaatje Prize for Portraiture from the Royal Society of Portrait Painters.

== Political donations ==
In 2000, Ondaatje donated £2 million to the UK Labour Party, and gave a further £100,000 to its head office in 2001.

== Adventurer ==
After many years of success, in which Ondaatje was considered one of Toronto's most aggressive and predatory businessmen, he left the business world in 1995. He moved to Britain and began a career as a philanthropist and adventurer. Travelling through India and Africa, he also became an author, following in the footsteps of his younger brother Michael Ondaatje, a novelist. His books describe his travels and adventures.

His 2003 book Hemingway in Africa details his thesis regarding the life and motivations of Ernest Hemingway.

== Titles, honours and arms ==
Ondaatje was made a Knight Bachelor by Queen Elizabeth II of the United Kingdom in 2003 in her 2003 Birthday Honours for his philanthropy and charitable services to Museums, Galleries and Societies. He had previously been made a Commander of the Order of the British Empire in the 2000 Birthday Honours, and was an Officer of the Order of Canada and a Senior Fellow of Massey College.

He was elected an Honorary Fellow of The Royal Society of Literature in 2003. In 2004, he succeeded, by re-assignation, the titles of Earl of Rothes, Lord of Leslie, and Sheriff of Fife in the Baronage of Scotland.

In 2011, he was made an Honorary Fellow of The Royal Canadian Geographical Society (RCGS) and was awarded its Gold Medal. In 2013, the RCGS established a medal in his name – the Sir Christopher Ondaatje Medal for Exploration — which is awarded annually to outstanding Canadian explorers.

=== Arms ===
Coat of arms of Sir Christopher Ondaatje

Crest
Issuant from a circlet Or a demi lion Azure armed and langued Gules.
Escutcheon
Or a demi lion Azure armed and langued Gules in base three maple leaves also Gules.
Motto
Fac Velis Perficies
(Do what you want, you will carry out)

== Personal life and death ==
Ondaatje had three children with his Latvian-born wife, Valda: David Ondaatje, a Hollywood script writer then film producer, Seira Ondaatje and Jans Ondaatje Rolls.

Sir Christopher Ondaatje died on 20 July 2026, aged 93.

== Publications ==
- Olympic Victory: The story behind the Canadian Bob-Sled Club's incredible victory at the 1964 Winter Olympic Games (1967)
- The Prime Ministers of Canada, 1867–1967 (1968)
- Leopard in the Afternoon — An Africa Tenting Safari (1989)
- The Man-eater of Punanai — a Journey of Discovery to the Jungles of Old Ceylon (1992)
- Sindh Revisited: A Journey in the Footsteps of Captain Sir Richard Francis Burton (1996)
- Journey to the Source of the Nile (1999)
- Hemingway in Africa: The Last Safari (2004)
- Woolf in Ceylon: An Imperial Journey in the Shadow of Leonard Woolf, 1904–1911 (2005)
- The Power of Paper: A History, a Financial Adventure and a Warning (2007)
- The Glenthorne Cat and other amazing leopard stories (2008)
- The Last Colonial: Curious Adventures & Stories from a Vanishing World (2011)
- Ondaatje, Christopher, ed. (2013). Love Duet and Other Curious Stories about Music. Minehead, Somerset: Rare Books and Berry.

== See also ==
- Ondaatje Letters
- Michael Ondaatje
- Ondaatje Prize
- Pearl Ondaatje
- Quint Ondaatje
