= Michael Ondaatje =

Canadian novelist and poet (born 1943)

Michael Ondaatje CC, FRSL
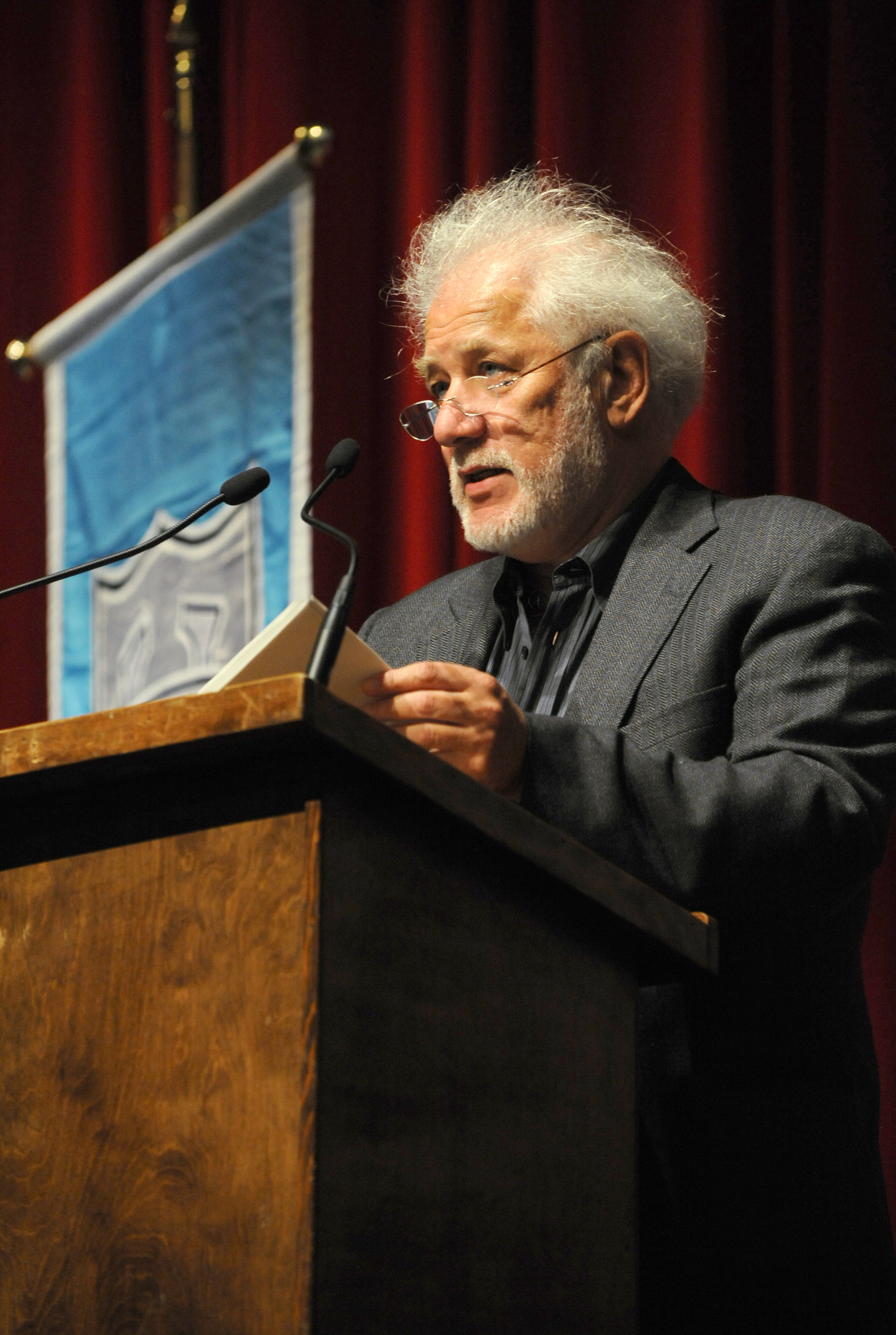
- Ondaatje speaking at Tulane University, 2010
- Born: Philip Michael Ondaatje; 12 September 1943 (age 83); Colombo, Western Province, British Ceylon (now Sri Lanka)
- Education: Dulwich College
- Alma mater: University of Toronto; Queen's University; Bishop's University
- Occupation: Author
- Spouse: Linda Spalding
- Relatives: Christopher Ondaatje (brother)
- Writing career
- Language: English
- Notable works: The English Patient; Running in the Family; Divisadero; In the Skin of a Lion; Coming Through Slaughter; Warlight
- Notable awards: Governor General's Award – Poetry; Booker Prize; Giller Prize; Prix Médicis étranger Order of Canada; St. Louis Literary Award

Philip Michael Ondaatje (/ɒnˈdɑːtʃiː/; born 12 September 1943) is a Sri Lankan-born Canadian poet, fiction writer and essayist.

Ondaatje's literary career began with his poetry: in 1967 he published The Dainty Monsters, and in 1970 the critically acclaimed The Collected Works of Billy the Kid. His novel The English Patient (1992), adapted as a film in 1996, received the Booker Prize in 1992. It later won the Golden Man Booker Prize as the best of the first 51 Booker Prize winners.

Ondaatje has been "fostering new Canadian writing" with two decades' commitment to Coach House Press (ca. 1970–1990), where he edited, among other authors, Daphne Marrlatt's early poems. His editorial credits include the journal Brick, and the Long Poem Anthology (1979), among others.

== Early life and education ==
Michael Ondaatje was born in 1943 in Colombo, Ceylon (now Sri Lanka). He was the youngest of four children born to Major Mervyn Ondaatje and Doris Gratiaen. His father managed a tea estate. The family had Tamil, Dutch and Sinhalese roots.

Ondaatje's parents separated when he was five. The next year, his mother moved to England with two of his siblings. He stayed in Ceylon until he joined her in 1954 at the age of eleven. He attended school at Dulwich College in London.

He emigrated to Montreal, Quebec, in 1962, and studied at Bishop's College School and Bishop's University in Lennoxville, Quebec, for three years. He attended the University of Toronto receiving a Bachelor of Arts degree in 1965, followed by a Master of Arts from Queen's University at Kingston.

The poet D. G. Jones noted his poetic ability.

== Early career ==
Ondaatje began teaching English at the University of Western Ontario in London, Ontario. In 1971, he taught English literature at Glendon College, York University.

== Adaptations ==
The Collected Works of Billy the Kid, Coming Through Slaughter and Divisadero have been adapted for the stage and produced in theatrical productions across North America and Europe. In addition to The English Patient adaptation, Ondaatje's films include a documentary on poet B.P. Nichol, Sons of Captain Poetry, and The Clinton Special: A Film About The Farm Show, which chronicles a collaborative theatre experience led in 1971 by Paul Thompson of Theatre Passe Muraille.

== Public stand ==
In April 2015, Ondaatje was one of several members of PEN American Center who withdrew as literary host when the organization gave its annual Freedom of Expression Courage award to Charlie Hebdo. The award came in the wake of the shooting attack on the magazine's Paris offices in January 2015. Ondaatje, along with 60 other writers, signed a letter to PEN expressing concern that the award valorized "selectively offensive material: material that intensifies the anti-Islamic, anti-Maghreb, anti-Arab sentiments already prevalent in the Western world."

== Personal life ==
In 1964, Michael Ondaatje married Canadian artist Kim Jones, later known as Kim Ondaatje. They had two children, Griffin and Quintin, and separated in 1980.

Ondaatje later married novelist Linda Spalding and they worked together as editors of the literary journal Brick.

Since the 1960s, Ondaatje has been a poetry editor for Toronto's Coach House Books. Ondaatje served as a founding member of the board of trustees of the Griffin Trust for Excellence in Poetry from 2000 to 2018. He established the Gratiaen Trust in Sri Lanka that annually awards the Gratiaen Prize.

== Awards and honours ==
=== Literary awards ===
- 1970: Governor General's Award for English-language poetry for The Collected Works of Billy the Kid.
- 1976: Books in Canada First Novel Award for Coming Through Slaughter.
- 1979: Governor General's Award for English-language poetry for There's a Trick With a Knife I'm Learning to Do: Poems 1963–1978.
- 1988: City of Toronto Book Award for In the Skin of a Lion.
- 1992: Booker Prize and Governor General's Award for English-language fiction for The English Patient. The novel also won the Canada Australia Prize.
- 2000: Giller Prize and Governor General's Award for English-language fiction for Anil's Ghost. The novel also won the Prix Médicis étranger and the Kiriyama Pacific Rim Book Prize.
- 2001: Irish Times International Fiction Prize for Anil's Ghost.
- 2002: Winner of the inaugural Canada Reads competition for In the Skin of a Lion.
- 2003: Special recognition at the American Cinema Editors Awards for The Conversations: Walter Murch and the Art of Editing Film. The book also won a Kraszna-Krausz Book Award.
- 2007: Governor General's Award for English-language fiction for Divisadero.
- 2016: St. Louis Literary Award.
- 2018: Golden Man Booker Prize for The English Patient.

=== Finalist and longlist placements ===
- 1987: Finalist for the Ritz Paris Hemingway Award for In the Skin of a Lion.
- 2018: Longlisted for the Booker Prize for Warlight.

=== Honours ===
- 1988: Appointed an Officer of the Order of Canada.
- 2005: Received the Sri Lanka Rathna, Sri Lanka's highest honour for foreign nationals.
- 2008: Received the Golden Plate Award from the American Academy of Achievement.
- 2012: Elected a Fellow of the Royal Society of Literature.
- 2016: Promoted to Companion of the Order of Canada, the order's highest rank.
- 2016: Brignolia ondaatjei, a spider species discovered in Sri Lanka, was named in his honour.
- Elected a Foreign Honorary Member of the American Academy of Arts and Letters.

== Books ==
=== Novels ===
- 1976: Coming Through Slaughter (also see "Other" section, 1980, below), Toronto: Anansi, ISBN 0-393-08765-4; New York: W. W. Norton, 1977
- 1987: In the Skin of a Lion, New York: Knopf, ISBN 0-394-56363-8, ISBN 0-14-011309-6
- 1992: The English Patient, New York: Knopf, ISBN 0-679-41678-1, ISBN 0-679-74520-3
- 2000: Anil's Ghost, New York: Knopf, ISBN 0-375-41053-8
- 2007: Divisadero, ISBN 0-307-26635-4 ISBN 9780307266354
- 2011: The Cat's Table, ISBN 978-0-7710-6864-5, ISBN 0-7710-6864-6
- 2018: Warlight, ISBN 077107378X, ISBN 978-0771073786

=== Poetry collections ===
- 1962: Social Call, The Love Story, In Search of Happiness, all featured in The Mitre: Lennoxville: Bishop University Press
- 1967: The Dainty Monsters, Toronto: Coach House Press
- 1969: The Man with Seven Toes, Toronto: Coach House Press
- 1970: The Collected Works of Billy the Kid: Left-Handed Poems (also see "Other" section, 1973, below), Toronto: Anansi ISBN 0-88784-018-3; New York: Berkeley, 1975
- 1973: Rat Jelly, Toronto: Coach House Press
- 1978: Elimination Dance/La danse eliminatoire, Ilderton: Nairn Coldstream; revised edition, Brick, 1980
- 1979: There's a Trick with a Knife I'm Learning to Do: Poems, 1963–1978, New York: W. W. Norton (New York, NY), 1979 ISBN 0-393-01191-7, ISBN 0-393-01200-X
  - published as Rat Jelly, and Other Poems, 1963–1978, London, United Kingdom: Marion Boyars, 1980
- 1984: Secular Love, Toronto: Coach House Press, ISBN 0-88910-288-0, ISBN 0-393-01991-8 ; New York: W. W. Norton, 1985
- 1986: All along the Mazinaw: Two Poems (broadside), Milwaukee, Wisconsin: Woodland Pattern
- 1986: Two Poems, Woodland Pattern, Milwaukee, Wisconsin
- 1989: The Cinnamon Peeler: Selected Poems, London, United Kingdom: Pan; New York: Knopf, 1991
- 1998: Handwriting, Toronto: McClelland & Stewart; New York: Knopf, 1999 ISBN 0-375-40559-3
- 2006: The Story, Toronto: House of Anansi, ISBN 0-88784-194-5
- 2024: A Year of Last Things, London: Jonathan Cape, ISBN 9781787335035

=== Editor ===
- 1971: The Broken Ark, animal verse; Ottawa: Oberon; revised as A Book of Beasts, 1979 ISBN 0-88750-050-1
- 1977: Personal Fictions: Stories by Munro, Wiebe, Thomas, and Blaise, Toronto: Oxford University Press ISBN 0-19-540277-4
- 1979: A Book of Beasts, animal verse; Ottawa: Oberon; revision of The Broken Ark, 1971
- 1979: The Long Poem Anthology, Toronto: Coach House ISBN 0-88910-177-9
- 1989: With Russell Banks and David Young, Brushes with Greatness: An Anthology of Chance Encounters with Greatness, Toronto: Coach House, 1989
- 1989: Edited with Linda Spalding, The Brick Anthology, illustrated by David Bolduc, Toronto: Coach House Press
- 1990: From Ink Lake: An Anthology of Canadian Short Stories; New York: Viking ISBN 0-394-28138-1
- 1990: The Faber Book of Contemporary Canadian Short Stories; London, United Kingdom: Faber
- 2000: Edited with Michael Redhill, Esta Spalding and Linda Spalding, Lost Classics, Toronto: Knopf Canada ISBN 0-676-97299-3; New York: Anchor, 2001
- 2002: Edited and wrote introduction, Mavis Gallant, Paris Stories, New York: New York Review Books

=== Other ===
- 1966: The Offering - co-producer and co-screenwriter
- 1970: Leonard Cohen (literary criticism), Toronto: McClelland & Stewart
- 1973: The Collected Works of Billy the Kid (play; based on his poetry; see "Poetry" section, 1970, above), produced in Stratford, Ontario; produced in New York, 1974; produced in London, England, 1984
- 1979: Claude Glass (literary criticism), Toronto: Coach House Press
- 1980: Coming through Slaughter (play based on his novel; see "Novels" section, 1976, above), first produced in Toronto
- 1982: Running in the Family, memoir, New York: W. W. Norton, ISBN 0-393-01637-4, ISBN 0-7710-6884-0
- 1982: Tin Roof, British Columbia, Canada: Island, ISBN 0-919479-10-3, ISBN 0-919479-93-6
- 1987: In the Skin of a Lion (based on his novel), New York: Knopf
- 1994: Edited with B. P. Nichol and George Bowering, An H in the Heart: A Reader, Toronto: McClelland & Stewart
- 1996: Wrote introduction, Anthony Minghella, adaptor, The English Patient: A Screenplay, New York: Hyperion Miramax
- 2002: The Conversations: Walter Murch and the Art of Editing Film, New York: Knopf, ISBN 0-676-97474-0
- 2002: Films by Michael Ondaatje
- 2004: Vintage Ondaatje, ISBN 1-4000-7744-3

== See also ==
- Ondaatje Letters
- Sri Lankan Chetties
- Christopher Ondaatje
- Kim Ondaatje
- Pearl Ondaatje
- List of Bishop's College School alumni
