= Ondaatje Letters =

18th century Tamil documents

The Ondaatje Letters (1729–1737), are the earliest examples of private correspondence in Tamil prose and most probably in any languages of South Asia. They are preserved at the Cape Town Archive Repositories, South Africa. The correspondence is between one Nicolaas Ondaatje (in Tamil, Ukantācci), a Chettiyar from Colombo, Ceylon (now Sri Lanka) who was sent to the Cape of Good Hope for ten years as a punishment by the Dutch East India Company (VOC). There are up to 50 letters addressed to Nicolaas by his family members and friends from Ceylon although his replies have not been preserved. For an edition and Annotated English translation of the letters, see Herman Tieken, Between Colombo and the Cape. Letters in Tamil, Dutch and Sinhala, Sent to Nicolaas Ondaatje from Ceylon, Exile at the Cape of Good Hope (1728-1737), Dutch Sources on South Asia, c. 1600–1825, Delhi: Manohar, 2015.

The letters consist mainly of family matters like births and deaths, caste rules, ideas on rehabilitation to get back to Ceylon. The letters are noted for their ungrammatical construction, lack of punctuation and many loan words from Sanskrit, Persian, Portuguese and Dutch.

The members of the Ondaatje family, originally hailing from Tamil Nadu, India made their home in Southern Ceylon. They have for several centuries functioned as mediators between the colonial powers and the local people. Nicolaas, a prominent member of the trading caste generally known as Chettys in Southern India and Sri Lanka, lived as a free man at the Cape during his stay. He was proficient in Tamil, Dutch and Sinhalese. He was trader, accountant, physician, interpreter and schoolmaster. Nicolaas died just before his exile ended. He is considered to be a direct ancestor of authors Michael Ondaatje and Christopher Ondaatje.
