= Francis Spufford =

English author and teacher (born 1964)

Francis Spufford FRSL
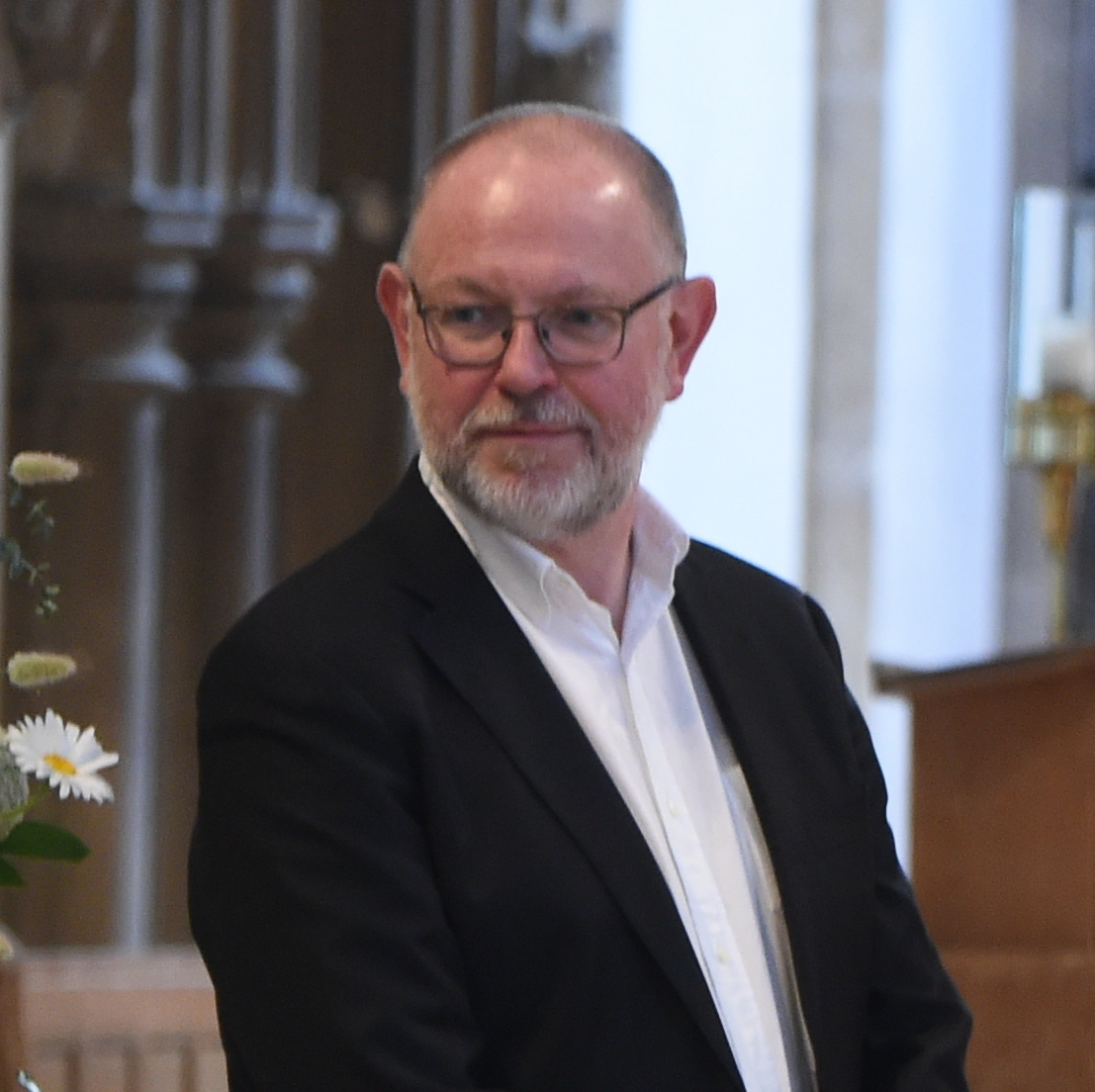
- Spufford in 2024
- Born: 1964 (age 61–62)
- Occupations: Novelist; non-fiction author
- Writing career
- Period: 1989–present
- Notable work: Golden Hill
- Website: gold.ac.uk/music-english-theatre/people/f-spufford//

Francis Spufford (born 1964) is an English author and writing teacher. His first novel Golden Hill received critical acclaim and numerous prizes including the Costa Book Award for First Novel, the Desmond Elliott Prize, and the Ondaatje Prize. In 2007 Spufford was elected a fellow of the Royal Society of Literature.

== Career ==
Spufford was chief publisher's reader from 1987–1990 for Chatto & Windus. He was a Royal Literary Fund fellow at Anglia Ruskin University from 2005 to 2007. He is a creative writing professor at Goldsmiths, University of London.

Spufford specialised in non-fiction for the first part of his career, but began a transition towards fiction in 2010. In 2016 he published his first novel, Golden Hill.

Spufford has also edited three anthologies: The Chatto Book of Cabbages and Kings (1989), The Chatto Book of the Devil (1992), and The Antarctic (2008).

Spufford has written an unauthorised novel set in the universe of C. S. Lewis's Narnia series, The Stone Table. The novel takes place between The Magician's Nephew and The Lion, the Witch and the Wardrobe. Spufford distributed self-printed copies to friends. Writer Adam Roberts praised it as "a seamless recreation of Lewis's writing-style at its best". The author hoped to obtain permission from the C. S. Lewis estate to publish it commercially, but did not receive a response from the estate.

== Personal life ==
Spufford was born in 1964. He is the son of social historian Margaret Spufford and economic historian Peter Spufford. He recalls the influence of Tolkien's The Hobbit: "It turned me from a painstaking decoder of printed letters into someone flying through a new medium. Books have been portals for me ever since." Later influences include "The great American fantasist John Crowley, with his toymaker’s sentences, showing me you can hide the real subject of a story in the margins, in the spaces between chapters."

He studied English literature at Trinity Hall, Cambridge, receiving a BA in 1985. Spufford lives in Ely, Cambridgeshire, and is a fellow of the Royal Society of Literature.

A former atheist, he is now a practising Christian and is married to an Anglican priest, Jessica Martin. The couple have two children. He served from 2015 to 2021 on the General Synod of the Church of England as a lay representative of the Diocese of Ely.

He wrote about his formative reading in the memoir The Child That Books Built. He proposed a canon of children's literature.

== Awards ==
Year	Title	Award	Category	Result	Ref.
1997	I May Be Some Time	Somerset Maugham Award	—	Won	
1997	I May Be Some Time	Sunday Times Young Writer of the Year Award	—	Won	
2003	Backroom Boys	Aventis Prize	—	Nominated	
2010	Red Plenty	BSFA Award	Non-Fiction	Shortlisted	
2011	Red Plenty	Orwell Prize	—	Longlisted	
2011	Red Plenty	Ondaatje Prize	—	Shortlisted	
2016	Golden Hill	Books Are My Bag Readers' Award	Beautiful Book	Shortlisted	
2016	Golden Hill	Costa Book Award for First Novel	—	Won	
2017	Golden Hill	Authors' Club Best First Novel Award	—	Shortlisted	
2017	Golden Hill	British Book Awards	Debut Novel of the Year	Shortlisted	
2017	Golden Hill	Desmond Elliott Prize	—	Won	
2017	Golden Hill	Ondaatje Prize	—	Won	
2017	Golden Hill	Rathbones Folio Prize	—	Shortlisted	
2017	Golden Hill	Walter Scott Prize	—	Shortlisted	
2018	Golden Hill	Europese Literatuurprijs	—	Longlisted	
2018	Golden Hill	RUSA CODES Reading Award	Historical Fiction	Shortlisted	
2021	Light Perpetual	Booker Prize	—	Longlisted	
2021	Light Perpetual	HWA Crown Awards	Gold	Longlisted	
2022	Light Perpetual	Encore Award	—	Won	
2024	Cahokia Jazz	Sidewise Award for Alternate History	Long Form	Won	

== Published work ==
- I May Be Some Time (1996)
- The Child That Books Built (2002)
- Backroom Boys (2003)
- Red Plenty (2010)
- Unapologetic: Why Despite Everything, Christianity Can Still Make Surprising Emotional Sense (2012)
- Golden Hill (2016)
- True Stories and Other Essays (2017)
- Light Perpetual (2021)
- Cahokia Jazz (2023)
- Nonesuch (2026)
