= Ondaatje Prize =

Literary award

- Royal Society of Literature Ondaatje Prize
- Awarded for: work of fiction, non-fiction or poetry, "evoking the spirit of a place"
- Sponsored by: Sir Christopher Ondaatje
- Country: United Kingdom
- Presented by: Royal Society of Literature
- First award: 2004
- Website: Official website

The Royal Society of Literature Ondaatje Prize is an annual literary award given by the Royal Society of Literature. The £10,000 award is for a work of fiction, non-fiction or poetry that evokes the "spirit of a place", and is written by someone who is a citizen of or who has been resident in the Commonwealth or the Republic of Ireland.

The prize bears the name of its benefactor Sir Christopher Ondaatje. The prize incorporates the Winifred Holtby Memorial Prize, which was presented up to 2002 for regional fiction.

== Winners ==
Year	Author	Title	Ref.
2004	Louisa Waugh	Hearing Birds Fly	
2005	Rory Stewart	The Places in Between	
2006	James Meek	The People's Act of Love	
2007	Hisham Matar	In the Country of Men	
2008	Graham Robb	The Discovery of France	
2009	Adam Nicolson	Sissinghurst: an Unfinished History	
2010	Ian Thomson	The Dead Yard: Tales of Modern Jamaica	
2011	Edmund de Waal	The Hare with Amber Eyes	
2012	Rahul Bhattacharya	The Sly Company of People Who Care	
2013	Philip Hensher	Scenes from Early Life	
2014	Alan Johnson	This Boy: A Memoir of a Childhood	
2015	Justin Marozzi	Baghdad: City of Peace, City of Blood	
2016	Peter Pomerantsev	Nothing Is True and Everything Is Possible	
2017	Francis Spufford	Golden Hill	
2018	Pascale Petit	Mama Amazonica	
2019	Aida Edemariam	The Wife's Tale	
2020	Roger Robinson	A Portable Paradise	
2021	Ruth Gilligan	The Butchers (also published as The Butchers' Blessing)	
2022	Lea Ypi	Free: Coming of Age at the End of History	
2023	Anthony Anaxagorou	Heritage Aesthetics	
2024	Ian Penman	Fassbinder: Thousands of Mirrors	
2025	Carys Davies	Clear	
2026	Diana McCaulay	A House for Miss Pauline	
