= 2008 Man Booker Prize =

Literary award

The 2008 Man Booker Prize was awarded at a ceremony on 14 October 2008. The prize was awarded to Aravind Adiga for The White Tiger.

== Judges ==
- Michael Portillo (chair)
- Alex Clark
- Louise Doughty
- James Heneage
- Hardeep Singh Kohli

== Shortlist ==
Author	Title	Genre(s)	Country	Publisher
Aravind Adiga	The White Tiger	Picaresque novel	India	Atlantic
Sebastian Barry	The Secret Scripture	Novel	Ireland	Faber & Faber
Amitav Ghosh	Sea of Poppies	Novel	India	John Murray
Linda Grant	The Clothes on Their Backs	Novel	UK	Virago
Philip Hensher	The Northern Clemency	Novel	UK	4th Estate
Steve Toltz	A Fraction of the Whole	Novel	Australia	Hamish Hamilton

== Longlist ==
Author	Title	Genre(s)	Country	Publisher
Aravind Adiga	The White Tiger	Picaresque novel	India	Atlantic
Gaynor Arnold	Girl in a Blue Dress	Novel	UK	Tindal Street Press
Sebastian Barry	The Secret Scripture	Novel	Ireland	Faber & Faber
John Berger	From A to X	Novel	UK	Verso
Michelle de Kretser	The Lost Dog	Novel	Australia	Chatto & Windus
Amitav Ghosh	Sea of Poppies	Novel	India	John Murray
Linda Grant	The Clothes on Their Backs	Novel	UK	Virago
Mohammed Hanif	A Case of Exploding Mangoes	Novel	UK	Jonathan Cape
Philip Hensher	The Northern Clemency	Novel	UK	4th Estate
Joseph O'Neill	Netherland	Novel	Ireland	4th Estate
Salman Rushdie	The Enchantress of Florence	Novel	UK	Jonathan Cape
Tom Rob Smith	Child 44	Thriller	UK	Simon & Schuster
Steve Toltz	A Fraction of the Whole	Novel	Australia	Hamish Hamilton

== Sources ==
- 2008 Man Booker Prize
