= Joan O'Hara =

Irish actress (1930–2007)

- O'Hara as Eunice Dunstan in Fair City
- Born: 10 October 1930; Sligo, Ireland
- Died: 23 July 2007 (aged 76); Dublin, Ireland
- Occupation: Actress
- Spouse: Francis J. Barry (m. 1961)
- Children: 4, including Sebastian
- Relatives: Mary O'Hara (sister)

Joan O'Hara (10 October 1930 – 23 July 2007) was an Irish stage, film and television actress. She was one of Ireland's most popular actresses and was, at her death, recognisable to television viewers as Eunice Dunstan, a gossip in Fair City on RTÉ One.

== Career ==
O'Hara was a member of the Abbey Players and performed in many plays in the Abbey Theatre in Dublin, including those by Seán O'Casey, Lady Gregory and W.B. Yeats. She appeared as Maurya in the 1988 film The Dawning. She appeared in a number of other films, including Ron Howard's Far and Away, Da, Footfalls, Home is the Hero and just before her death, How About You. In this her final film, she starred with Vanessa Redgrave and her friend Brenda Fricker.

More recently, O'Hara was best known for appearing in the popular Irish television soap opera Fair City, broadcast on RTÉ One. She joined the soap in 1994, portraying the character Eunice Dunstan until her own (O'Hara's) death in 2007. Thus she was described as both one of Ireland's most popular actresses and as one of the finest actors of her generation on her death. She admired in particular Samuel Beckett, Federico García Lorca and Ingmar Bergman. While she took a no-nonsense approach to her craft, famously giving the advice that when in doubt, one should relate to the fireplace, she was educated at the Abbey School of Acting and had a deep appreciation and knowledge of theoretical approaches to acting and was an admirer of the European and American avant-garde. As actor Alan Stanford said after her death, "She had the most amazing energy. She was in the truest sense one of the last of the greats".

== Personal life ==
O'Hara was born and raised in Finisklin, Sligo, the daughter of Major John Charles O'Hara, a civil engineer and sometime officer in the British Corps of Royal Engineers and his wife, Mai (née Kirwan). One of her sisters, Mary (born 1935), is a soprano and harpist. She attended the same Ursuline convent school as fellow actress and friend, Pauline Flanagan.

O'Hara lived most of her life in Monkstown, Dublin, with a stay in London, with her husband, poet and architect Francis J. Barry. The couple had four children: Siubhan, Jane, Guy, and Sebastian, an author and playwright, whose works include The Steward of Christendom, and the Man Booker Prize-shortlisted novels A Long Long Way and The Secret Scripture.

O'Hara was a year-round sea-swimmer.

== Death ==
Joan O'Hara Barry (she kept her maiden name as her stage name) died in Dublin on 23 July 2007 of complications from a blood clot, aged 76. Her death was announced on RTÉ News the following day.

== See also ==
- List of Fair City characters
- List of longest-serving soap opera actors#Ireland
