= On Canaan's Side =

2011 novel by Sebastian Barry

- First edition
- Author: Sebastian Barry
- Language: English
- Genre: Novel
- Publisher: Faber and Faber
- Publication date: 24 July 2011
- Publication place: Ireland
- Media type: Print (Hardcover & Paperback)
- Pages: 272 pp (Hardback)
- ISBN: 978-0-571-22653-5
- Preceded by: The Secret Scripture

On Canaan's Side is a 2011 novel written by Irish playwright and novelist Sebastian Barry.

== Plot ==
The novel is narrated by the 89-year-old Lily Bere, the sister of Annie Dunne (2002) and Willie Dunne from A Long Long Way (2005), and the daughter of the character Thomas Dunne from The Steward of Christendom (1995), as she looks back on her life, having lived through the Irish War of Independence and escaped to Chicago with her boyfriend Tadg Bere. The Cleveland East Ohio Gas explosion of 1944 is referenced within the story and plays an important role in the plot.

== Awards and honors ==
- 2011 Man Booker Prize, longlist
- 2012 Walter Scott Prize, winner
