= Days Without End =

Days Without End may refer to:

- Days Without End (play), a 1933 play by Eugene O'Neill
- Days Without End (novel), a 2016 novel by Sebastian Barry
