= Baltinglass =

Town in County Wicklow, Ireland

Baltinglass Bealach Conglais
- Town
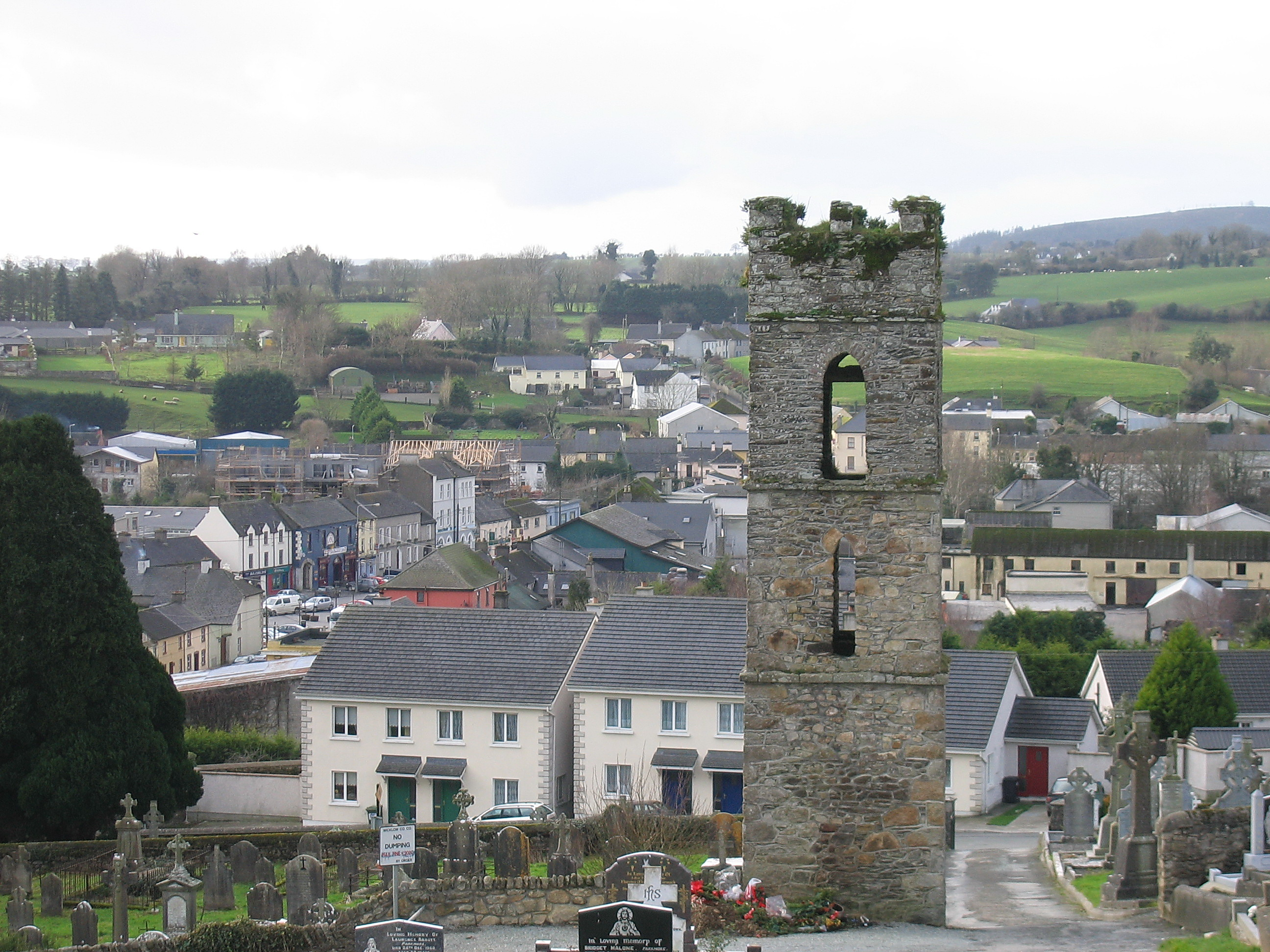
- Baltinglass, from Chapel Hill

- Location in Ireland
- Coordinates: 52.941°N 6.711°W
- Country: Ireland
- Province: Leinster
- County: Wicklow
- Elevation: 118 m (387 ft)

Population (2016)
  - Total: 2,137
- Irish Grid Reference: S863886

Baltinglass, historically known as Baltinglas (Irish: Bealach Conglais, meaning 'road (or way) of Conglas'), is a town in south-west County Wicklow, Ireland. It is located on the River Slaney near the border with County Carlow and County Kildare, on the N81 road. The town is in a civil parish of the same name.

== Etymology ==
The town's Irish name, Bealach Conglais means "the way of Conglas". It was the name of a palace at Baltinglass, where, according to the Irish etymologist Patrick Weston Joyce, the powerful Leinster king Branduff resided in the sixth century. (Note: Joyce uses the spelling Belach Chonglais) Conglas was a member of the mythological warrior collective, the Fianna.

A nineteenth-century explanation is found in Samuel Lewis' A Topographical Dictionary of Ireland, where he says that the name, "according to most antiquaries," comes from Baal-Tin-Glas, meaning the "pure fire of Baal," and that this suggests that the area was a centre for "druidical worship".

The detailed study, The Place-names of County Wicklow by Liam Price provides several variations of the town name from the 12th century Book of Leinster, through King King Henry VIII's state papers, to the 17th century Down Survey.

Previous Irish-language names for the village bring to mind its monastic past. These, as mentioned in two 17th-century works, are Mainistear an Bhealaigh and Mainister an Beala. The first of these, Mainistir an Bhealaigh, has been the name used since the beginning of the independent Irish state.

== History ==
The surrounding hills of the area are rich in archaeological and historical sites, including the Rathcoran passage structure. On the highest point of the Baltinglass Hill, north-east of the village, the passage grave from the Stone Age whose outer walls are finished in chalk not native to the area, is said on bright days to be visible from Kildare's Curragh 48 km (30 mi) away.

Research published in 2025 identified more than 600 suspected hilltop dwellings dating to the Neolithic period and Early Bronze Age in the Brusselstown Ring, "a site of major national and international heritage importance" within the Baltinglass Hillfort Cluster, making it the largest nucleated prehistoric settlement by far ever discovered in Ireland and Britain. The discovery challenged the theory that the Vikings built the first Irish towns; the Baltinglass settlement existed 2,000 years before the Vikings arrived.

To the north end of the village on the weir of the River Slaney lies the ruins of an ancient monastery, Baltinglass Abbey, that has had many additions over the centuries; the original church is said to date from around 700 A.D.

The medieval Viscounts Baltinglass were from the Hiberno-Norman Eustace family, who also founded Ballymore Eustace. Their estates later passed to their cousin Sir Maurice Eustace, Lord Chancellor of Ireland 1660–1665. Sir Maurice did much to promote the development of the town, building a church, a school and a bridge, and encouraging new settlers.

The town gained national attention in 1950 when Labour TD for Wicklow James Everett replaced local postal worker, Helen Cooke, as sub-postmaster in the local post office. Everett appointed his supporter, Michael Farrell, to the position. This led to accusations of political cronyism nationally and a local row which became known as the 'Battle of Baltinglass'. Telegraph poles and phone lines were cut in protest and a shop run by the Farrell family was boycotted. Farrell resigned in December 1950 and Cooke was appointed to the role as sub-postmistress, a position she retained until her retirement in 1962.

The town centre mainly lies east of the river, along Main Street and ends at Market and Weavers Square. West of the river, the town is located around the N81/R747 crossroads, along Edward Street, Mill Street and Belan Street. Quinn's superstore is a landmark site on Mill Street to the north of the town.

In the 20 years between the 1996 and 2016 census, the population of the town almost doubled from 1,127 to 2,137 people.

== Built heritage ==
Baltinglass has a number of archaeological and built heritage sites, such as Baltinglass Abbey and St. Mary's Church, and a number of other buildings of architectural and historical merit, several of which are located in the town centre.

=== Courthouse ===
Baltinglass courthouse is located on Market Square. It was built c. 1810 and has been remodelled on several occasions. It was damaged during the War of Independence in 1920. It was decommissioned by the Courts Service in 2013 and now houses a heritage and visitor centre.

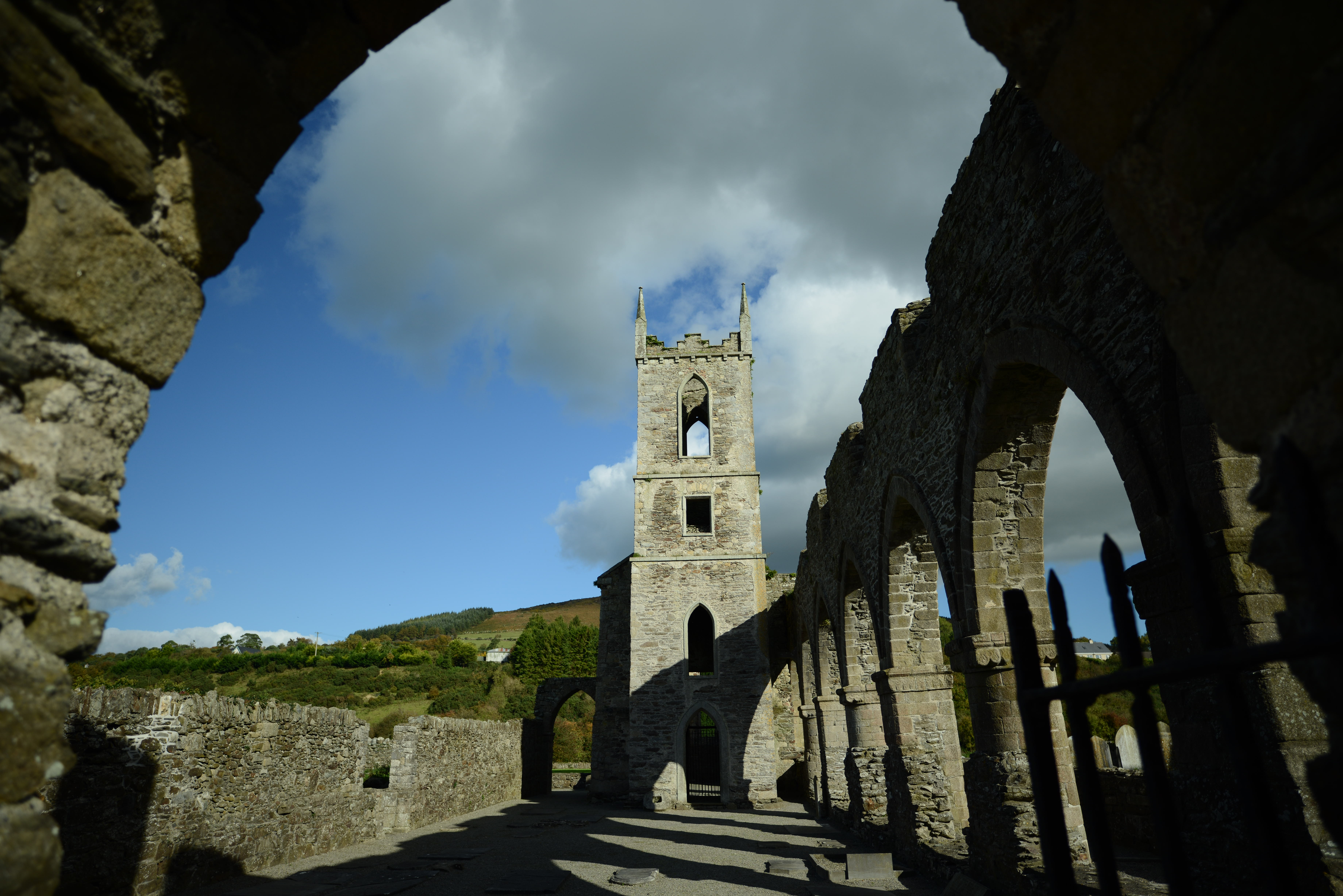
Baltinglass Abbey

=== Baltinglass Abbey ===
The ruins of a medieval Cistercian abbey are situated on the north side of Baltinglass town. The abbey was founded by Diarmait Mac Murchada in 1148. The abbey was suppressed in 1536 during the Dissolution of the Monasteries under Henry VIII. It is designated for protection as a national monument.

=== St. Mary's Church ===
St. Mary's is a late-19th century gothic Church of Ireland church located in the ruins of Baltinglass Abbey. It was built c. 1884. The adjacent rectory was built at the same time.

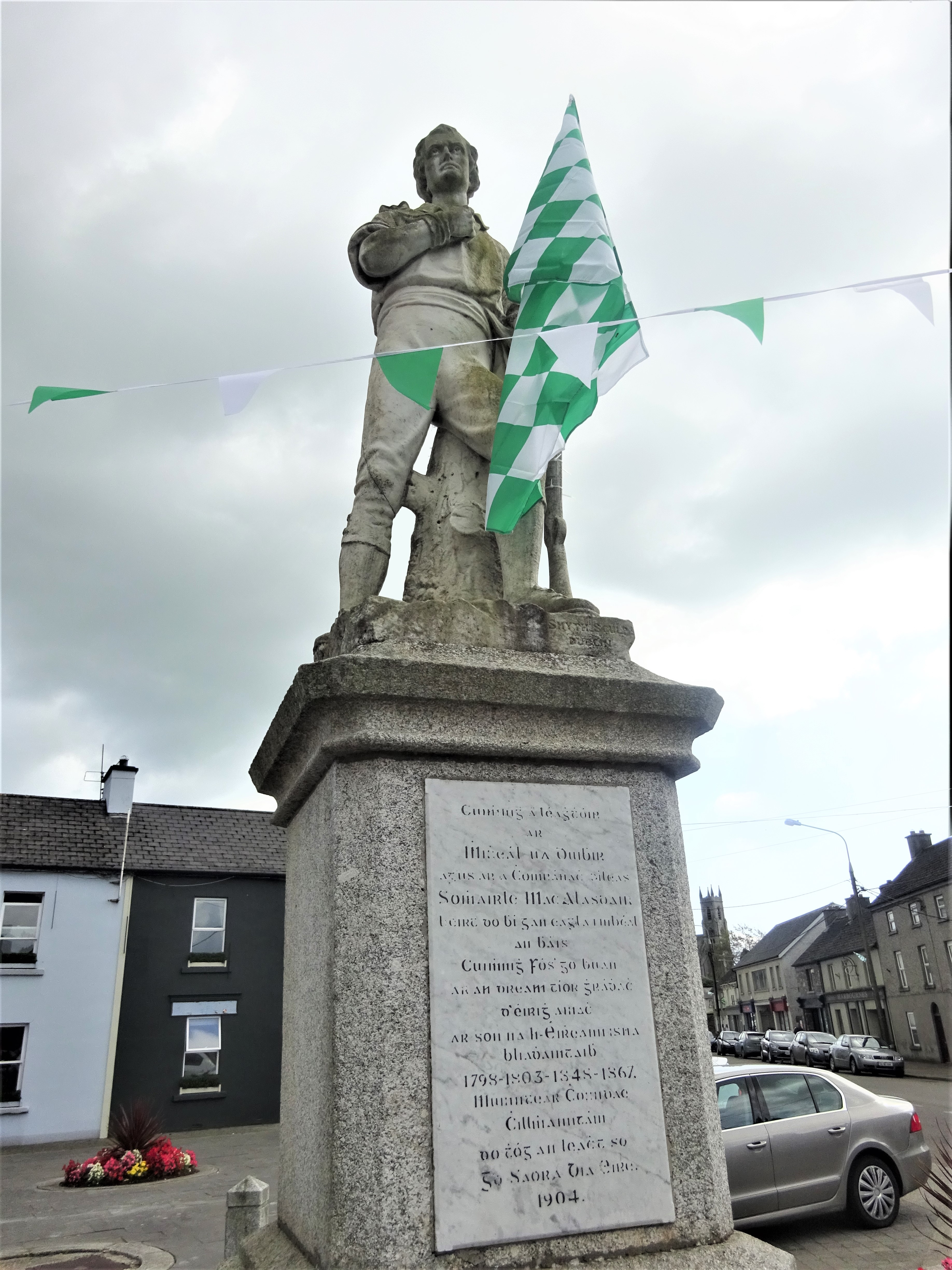
Statue of Sam McAllister

=== McAllister Monument ===
The monument which was unveiled in 1904 commemorates the involvement of Michael Dwyer and Sam McAllister in the 1798 Rebellion. Sam McAllister was a Presbyterian from Ulster who deserted the Antrim Militia and joined the rebels in Wicklow. He was killed in an ambush at a small cottage in Derrynamuck in the Glen of Imaal on 15 February 1799. McAllister drew the fire of British soldiers to allow Michael Dwyer to escape. The cottage is now an national monument. The monument also commemorates the participants of the rebellions of 1803, 1848. and 1867. The statue is made from Sicilian marble depicts Sam McAllister holding a rifle in his left hand and his right arm in a sling. The base of the statue was made from granite quarried in Ballyknockan.

== Culture ==
Baltinglass has featured in film and theatre, being the location for the 1974 movie of Brian Friel's play Philadelphia, Here I Come! starring Donal McCann and Siobhán McKenna. It was also the location of the workhouse in Sebastian Barry's play The Steward of Christendom.

== Sport ==
The local Gaelic Athletic Association club, Baltinglass GAA, has several pitches and teams. One of their early successes was the 1912 Junior title. In 1927 they won the Wicklow Senior Hurling title. 1958 saw Baltinglass win the Wicklow Senior Football Championship for the first time and, in 2020, they won their 23rd such title. In 1990 the club claimed the All-Ireland Senior Club Football Championship.

== Transport ==
=== Rail ===
Baltinglass railway station opened on 1 September 1885, as part of the line from Sallins to Tullow. It closed to passengers on 27 January 1947 and to goods traffic on 10 March 1947, and closed altogether on 1 April 1959 along with the rest of the line. The site is now mainly occupied by a livestock mart, although the station building remains intact.

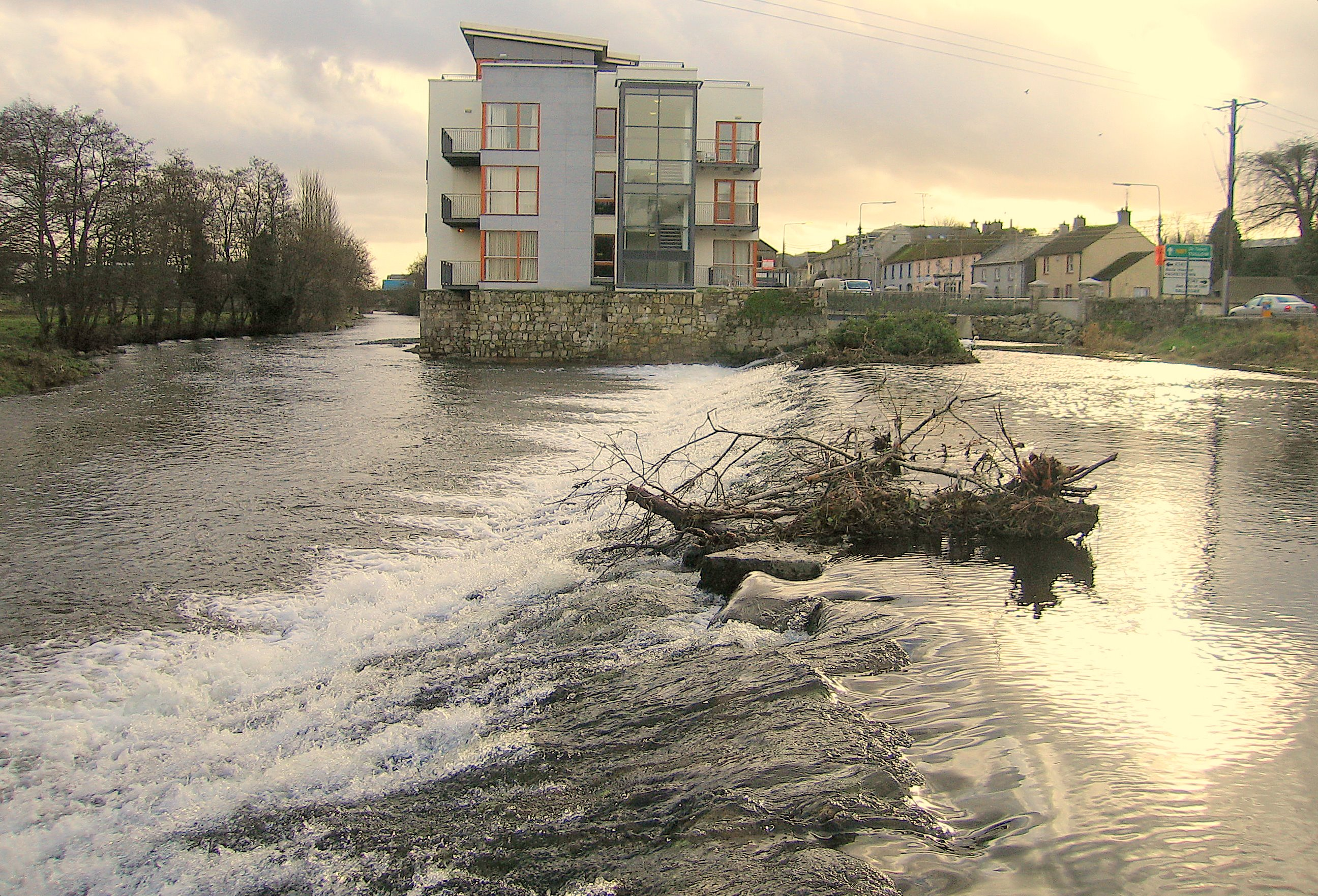
Apartments and weir on the River Slaney in Baltinglass

=== Bus ===
Bus services are available to Carlow via Rathvilly and Tullow, twice daily Mondays to Fridays. This route is operated by JJ Kavanagh and Sons, and it stops in Baltinglass outside Burkes shop, to pick up/drop off passengers. Bus Éireann route 132 provides a once-a-day, each-way commuter link to Dublin via Tallaght on the same days. There is also a limited range of Bus Éireann Expressway services (usually one or two journeys a day each way) linking Baltinglass to Dublin, New Ross, Waterford and Rosslare Europort, while Thursdays-only route 132 provides a link to and from Carnew.

In November 2022, Dublin Bus met with the Social Democrats TD Jennifer Whitmore and agreed to investigate potentially extending the number 65 bus route to Baltinglass.

== Baltinglass Local Electoral Area ==
The Baltinglass local electoral area of County Wicklow consists of the electoral divisions of Aghowle, Ballingate, Ballinglen, Ballinguile, Ballybeg, Baltinglass, Blessington, Burgage, Carnew, Coolattin, Coolballintaggart, Coolboy, Cronelea, Donaghmore, Donard, Dunlavin, Eadestown, Hartstown, Hollywood, Humewood, Imael North, Imael South, Kilbride (in the former Rural District of Baltinglass No.1), Killinure, Lackan, Lugglass, Money, Rath, Rathdangan, Rathsallagh, Shillelagh, Stratford, Talbotstown, The Grange, Tinahely, Tober, Togher and Tuckmill.

== People ==
- Max Hart, racing driver
- Nikki Hayes, radio presenter and DJ.
- Larry Murphy, rapist and suspected serial killer.
- John Thomond O'Brien, 19th century military officer and adventurer in South America.
- Kevin O'Brien, inter-county GAA player.
- Billy Timmins, Fine Gael TD.

== See also ==
- Baltinglass (Parliament of Ireland constituency)
