= County home (Ireland) =

Former system of welfare institutions

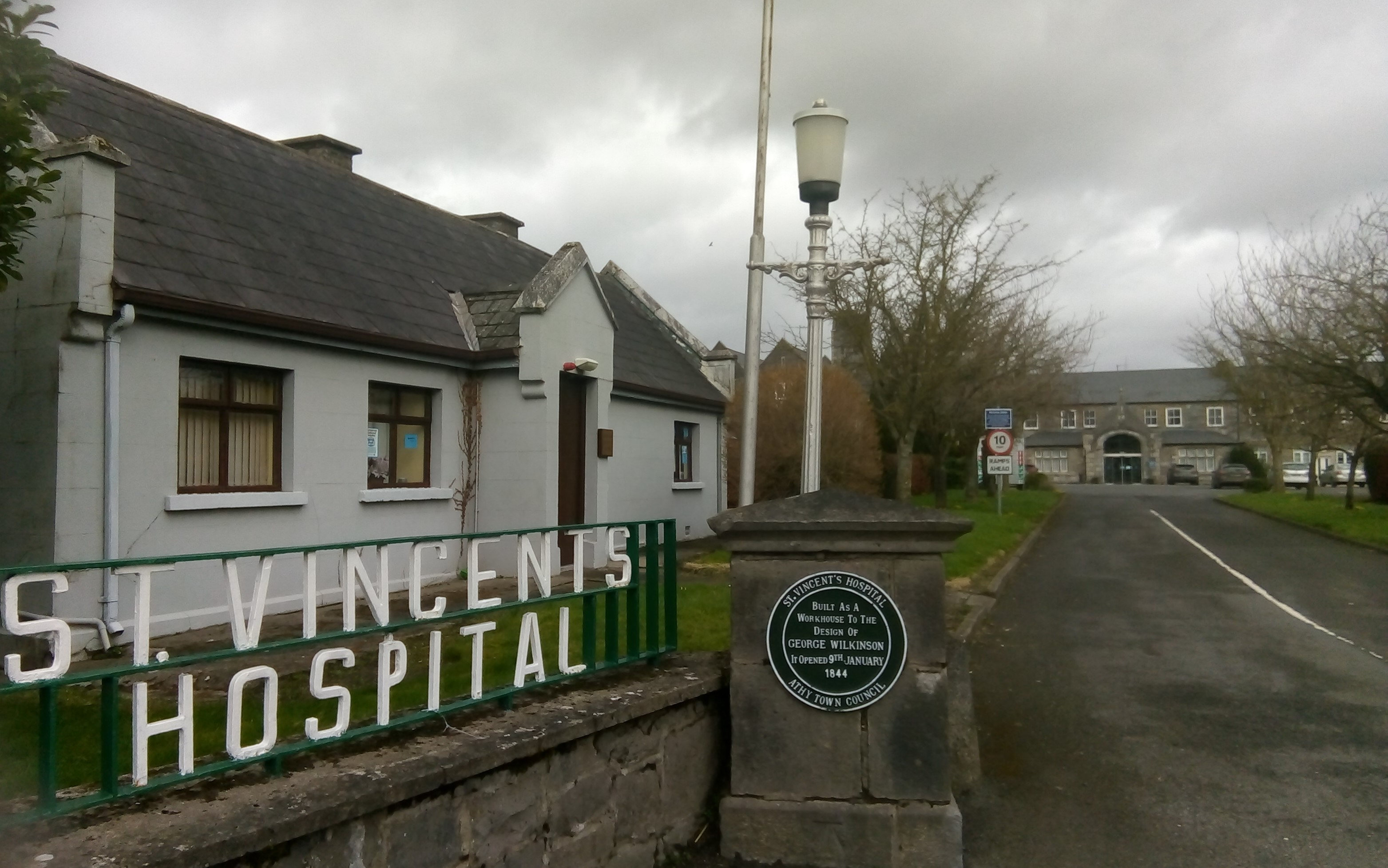
St. Vincent's Hospital, Athy, the county home for County Kildare

In the Irish Free State and Republic of Ireland, the county home (Irish: teaghlach contae) was an institution which replaced workhouses from 1922 onwards.

County homes were total institutions housing a wide variety of people, mostly poor: the elderly, the chronically ill, the mentally ill, children, the intellectually disabled and unmarried mothers.

== History ==
The county homes were founded in the early 1920s after the formation of the Irish Free State. After the abolition of the existing system of workhouses, administration was centralised under the county councils, with the following model:

- a central county home for the aged and infirm
- a separate infirmary section to deal with chronic and long term cases,
- a county hospital for major surgery, medical cases and abnormal midwifery
- district hospitals for medical cases, minor surgical cases and midwifery
- fever hospitals for infectious diseases

These reforms were retrospectively legalised by the Local Government (Temporary Provisions) Act, 1923. The county homes were generally run by Catholic religious orders and financed by the state.

Girls and women pregnant outside of marriage were sometimes sent to Magdalene asylums and Mother and Baby Homes, where they were required to perform heavy labour and often received substandard care; they were often forced to place their children for adoption. Women who kept their children were often not wanted by their families and struggled to find employment or housing, so a large number of unmarried mothers were forced to live in county homes. Orphans and illegitimate children were often placed in county homes for a long period of time; they were used as "dumping grounds" until children could be transferred to other institutions like industrial schools. A report of 1947–48 notes that many children were abandoned in the county home by their mothers.

A Poor Law Commission's report of 1927 stated that County Homes were unsuitable for unmarried mothers and babies.

In 1943, about 8,000 people were living in county homes.

From the 1950s onwards, county homes were reformed and standards of care improved. By the 1990s, they had been abolished, with the buildings now serving as normal hospitals.

== List ==
There was one in each of the twenty-seven counties of the Republic of Ireland (Tipperary was at that time divided into North and South), except that there was none in County Louth and three in County Cork.

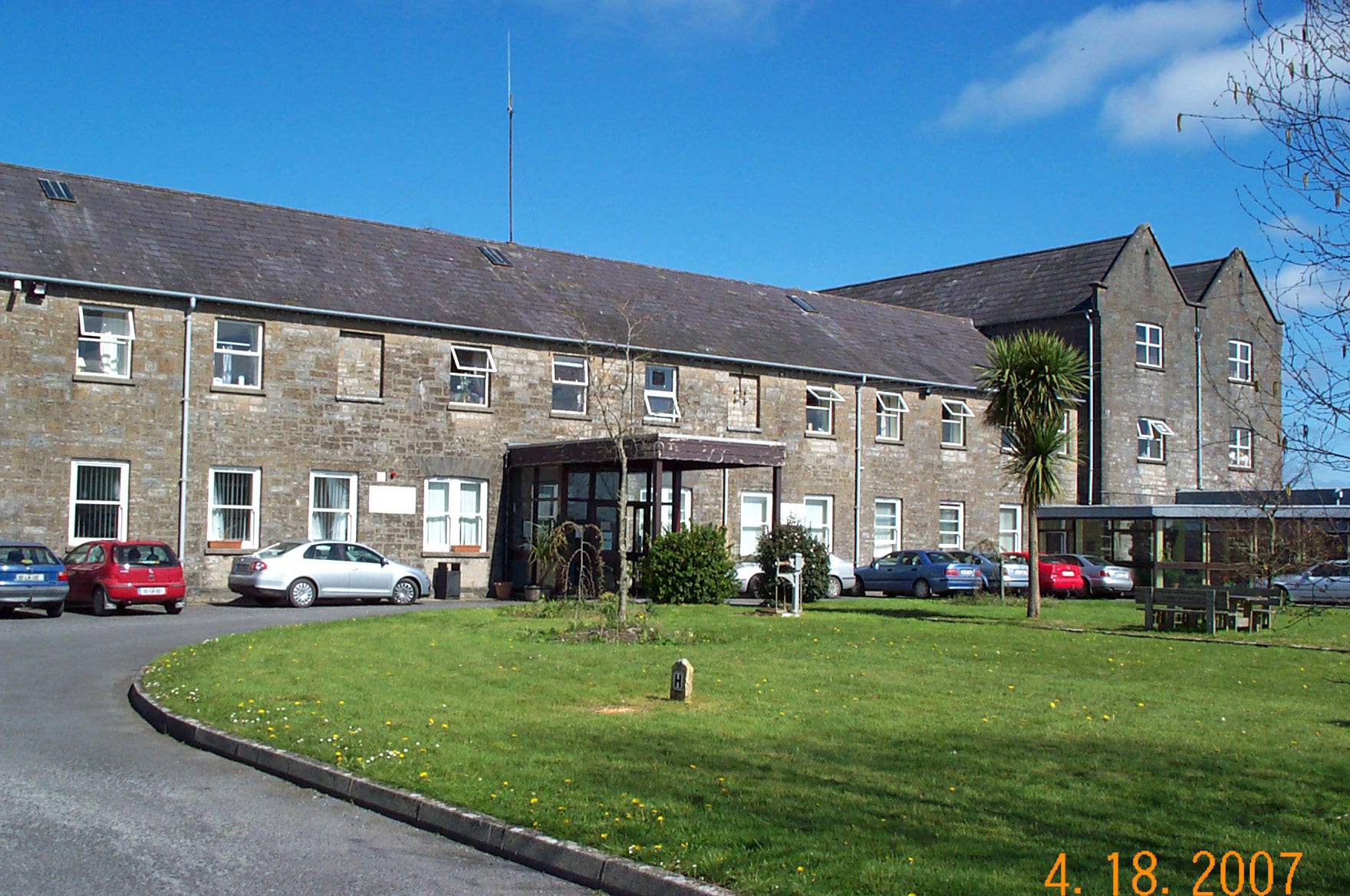
Roscommon's county home

- Athy (County Kildare): St. Vincent's Hospital
- Carlow (County Carlow): located in a former British Army cavalry barracks; renamed Sacred Heart Home in 1952
- Cavan (County Cavan): St. Felim's Hospital, a former workhouse
- Cashel (South Tipperary): St Patrick's Hospital
- Castlebar (County Mayo): Mayo County Home
- Castleblayney (County Monaghan): St Mary's Hospital
- Clonakilty (West County Cork): West Cork County Home
- Cork City (East County Cork): St Finbarr's
- Dublin (County Dublin): St Kevin's Institution (modern St. James's Hospital)
- Dungarvan (County Waterford): St Joseph's Hospital
- Edenderry (County Offaly): Ofalia House
- Ennis (County Clare): St. Joseph's County Home
- Enniscorthy (County Wexford): St John's Hospital
- Killarney (County Kerry): St. Columbanus’ Hospital
- Longford (County Longford): St. Joseph's Hospital
- Loughrea (County Galway): St Brendan's Hospital
- Manorhamilton (County Leitrim): Our Lady's Hospital
- Mountmellick (County Laois / Queen's County): St. Vincent's
- Mallow (North County Cork): Mallow Union Workhouse (now Mallow General Hospital)
- Mullingar (County Westmeath): Midland Regional Hospital
- Newcastle West (County Limerick): St Ita's Hospital
- Rathdrum (County Wicklow): St Colman's Hospital
- Roscommon (County Roscommon): Sacred Heart Hospital
- Sligo (County Sligo): St John's Hospital
- Stranorlar (County Donegal): St Joseph's
- Thomastown (County Kilkenny): St Columbkille's County Home
- Thurles (North Tipperary): Community Hospital of the Assumption
- Trim (County Meath): St Joseph's Hospital
- Tullamore (County Offaly / King's County): Midlands Regional Hospital
- Tullamore (County Offaly / King's County): Riada House

== Cultural depictions ==
As a symbol of the failure of the newly independent state to provide for the needs of its people, the county home has occasionally featured in fiction.

Sebastian Barry's 1995 play The Steward of Christendom takes place in a county home, depicting the fractured memories of a mentally-ill former policeman.

The expression "Goodnight Ballivor, I'll Sleep in Trim", famous in County Meath, is possibly a reference to the Trim county home.

In Colm Tóibín's 2009 novel Brooklyn, the main character notes that New York's "forgotten Irish" remind her of "men from the County Home;" she is a native of Enniscorthy, where the Wexford county home was sited.

Niamh Boyce wrote Kitty, a sequence of poems about her grandaunt, a seamstress in the Athy county home.

John MacKenna mentions the "county home" in a poem in his 2012 collection Where Sadness Begins.
