= Baltinglass hillfort complex =

Hillfort cluster in County Wicklow, Ireland

- Baltinglass-Kilranelagh hillfort complex
- Type: Hillfort complex
- Location: near Baltinglass, County Wicklow, Ireland

Site notes
- Area: Slaney Valley

Baltinglass hillfort complex, sometimes known as the Baltinglass-Kilranelagh hillfort complex, is a cluster of 13 prehistoric hillforts near Baltinglass, County Wicklow.

Tom Condit (Office of Public Works) dubbed Baltinglass as the "hillfort capital of Ireland" in 1992. As of 2024, 13 large hilltop enclosures have been identified across seven hills, within a 10 km radius of Baltinglass, making Baltinglass the only area with more than two hillforts.

== Hillforts ==
- On Baltinglass Hill:
  - Rathcoran, neolithic.
  - Rathnagree, Bronze Age.
  - Sruhan, Bronze Age.
- On Spinans Hill:
  - Spinans Hill 1, neolithic.
  - Spinans Hill 2, undated, one of the largest hillforts in Ireland, discovered by Tom Condit in the 1990s using Irish Army Air Corps photographs.
  - Brusselstown Ring, undated, recorded on OS map in 1838. 600 suspected hilltop dwellings have been identified in Brusselstown making it the largest nucleated prehistoric settlement by far ever discovered in Ireland and Britain.
- On Kilranelagh Hill:
  - Kilranelagh, undated, located in Colvinstown Upper.
  - Ballinroan Upper, undated.
  - Boleycarrigeen, undated.
- Hughstown, on Carrigeen Hill, neolithic, recorded by a Cambridge University aerial survey in the 1960s.
- Tinoran Hill, Bronze Age, discovered by Tom Condit in the 1990s using Irish Army Air Corps photographs.
- Corballis Hill, undated.
- Fauna Hill, undated, recorded by Liam Price, rediscovered by LiDAR survey.
