= St Vincent's Hospital, Athy =

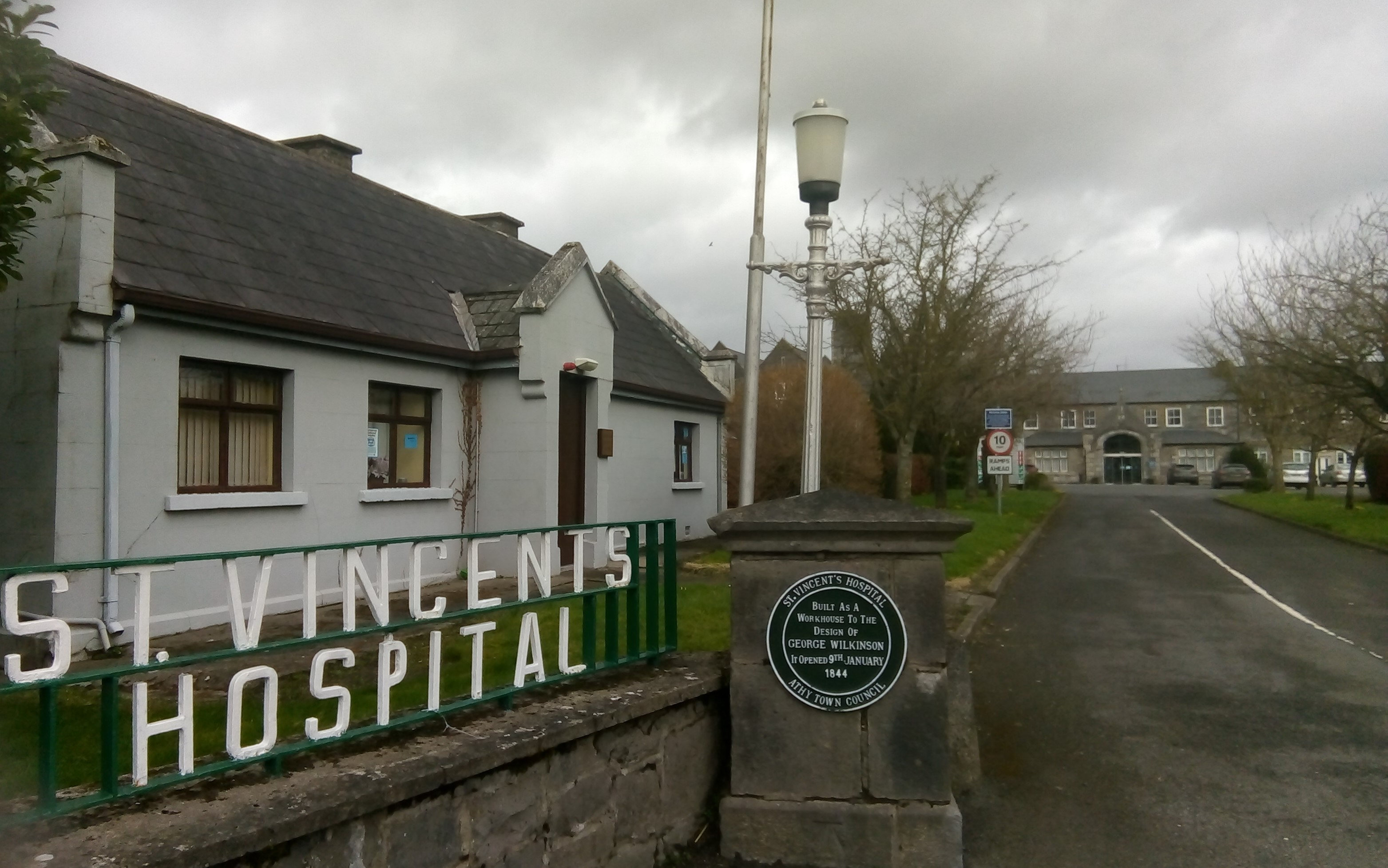

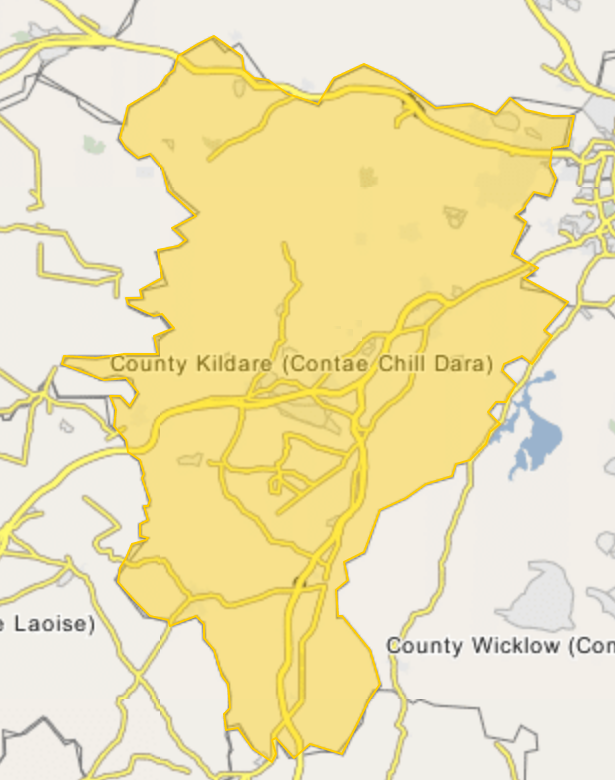
- Location within County Kildare Location within Ireland

Geography
- Location: Woodstock Street, Athy, County Kildare, Ireland
- Coordinates: 52.998250°N 6.994619°W

Organisation
- Care system: Private
- Type: Specialist

Services
- Emergency department: No Accident & Emergency
- Beds: 116
- Speciality: Geriatric care

History
- Founded: 3 April 1969

Links
- Lists: Hospitals in the Republic of Ireland

St Vincent's Hospital, Athy (Irish: Ospidéal Naomh Uinseann Áth Í) is a hospital located in Athy, Ireland.

== History ==
Athy workhouse was established on the site under the Irish Poor Laws; it opened on 9 January 1844, just before the Great Famine. The Sisters of Mercy arrived as nursing sisters in 1873. In 1898, it became a County Home. 268 residents were transferred to the new St Vincent's Hospital on 3 April 1969.

== Services ==
At present St Vincent's primarily provides geriatric care, including a residential care centre and day-care facilities for Alzheimer's patients. It is monitored by the Health Information and Quality Authority (HIQA).
