= The Mulberry Empire =

2002 novel by Philip Hensher

- First edition
- Author: Philip Hensher
- Language: English
- Genre: Fictional prose
- Publisher: Flamingo
- Publication date: 1 January 2002
- Publication place: England
- Media type: Print
- Pages: 560
- ISBN: 0007112262
- Preceded by: Pleasured (1998)
- Followed by: The Fit (2004)

The Mulberry Empire is the second novel by English author, Philip Hensher, released on 3 September 1998 through the now defunct Flamingo imprint of HarperCollins. Longlisted for the 2002 Booker Prize, the novel centres around the causes and ultimate denouement of the First Anglo-Afghan War as experienced through the eyes of over a hundred characters both real and fictional.

== Plot ==
The story opens in Kabul with Alexander Burnes and his two travel companions stewing away in ennui as they await an audience with Dost Mohammad Khan. Effectively under house arrest, they have spent weeks inside the residence of the Newab Jubbur Khan, a brother of the Dost. Eventually the Englishmen are allowed into the Bala Hissar. A seasoned traveller fluent in Persian, Burnes considers himself well-versed in dealing with oriental potentates, but is floored by the intelligence and depth of Dost Mohammad, who constantly peppers him with questions regarding the outside world.

In London, the beautiful ingenue Bella Garraway accompanies her opium addict of a father to a dinner party at the mansion of aging socialite Lady Woodcourt. There she runs into Burnes, the soiree's guest of honour, now famous as a result of his bestselling account of his travels. Burnes manages to obtain Bella's permission to visit her at her father's London House. As the evening wears on he interacts with Stokes, a disagreeable newspaper editor professing an anti-imperialism outlook who deplores the jingoistic sentiments Burnes's book has generated among readers.

After a lapse of some weeks, Burnes eventually calls on Bella, beginning a courtship that is indirect, consisting solely of witty repartees, for several more months. Only when it nears the time for Burnes's return to India do the two openly display their feelings for one another. This leads Burnes to drag Bella to the London wharfs, where he waxes lyrical about the wonders of global trade. The couple then head back to Bella's, where they proceed to have sex.

In Kabul, Dost Mohammad hears of a new English visitor to the city. Suspecting the foreigner of espionage on account of his incessant information-gathering, the Afghan emir orders the courtier Khushhal to send his son Hassan to insinuate himself into the mystery man's household. Hassan is universally recognised for his angelic beauty by all except his father and is consequently deemed suitable for the mission, as the Englishman is known to be a sodomite.

The Englishman in question turns out to be Charles Masson, an autodidact scholar intent on recording the customs, culture, and history of Afghanistan. Masson had previously been a soldier of the East India Company, during which time he ekes out a miserable existence as a pariah. His only source of consolation are his visits to the antiques shop of Mr Das, from whom he buys a multitude of artefacts which he has been covertly cataloguing during midnight visits to the latrines. One night Masson is raped by McVitie, the most popular member of his platoon, who recognises Masson's homosexuality. The incident results in Masson deserting the army, albeit only after having murdered McVitie's sidekick, who had stood guard during the rape.

The story then shifts to the Crimea, where widowed landowner Nikolai Mikhailovich Layevsky welcomes back his son Pavel from a five-year-long stint in the army. To his horror the reunion is far from private as Pavel has brought with him Vitkevich. A terminally impolite eccentric who gives off a perpetual air of sullen insouciance, Vitkevich is not only a favourite of the Russian royal family, but also an object of adoration by his fellow officers. Nikolai however fails to see why his son should be so besotted with the stranger, not knowing Vitkevich to be the sort of fellow who would ensconce himself in a brothel for the sole purpose of drinking champagne. Vitkevich catches Nikolai enjoying an intimate moment with Masha, the estate's head cook who is something of a surrogate mother to Pavel, which results in Vitkevich revealing that he is soon to embark on a mission of the utmost importance, namely a visit to Kabul. Vitkevich then proceeds to sermonise on Russia's manifest destiny and the empire's need for territorial expansion, a concept Masha voices scepticism over.

In London there is a panic over Russian ambitions in Central Asia, the hysteria having been partly whipped up by readers of Burnes's travelogue. Lord Palmerston finds himself being constantly assailed by advocates of an aggressive anti-Russian foreign policy, even at the opera. Meanwhile, out in the Gloucestershire countryside, the journalist Stokes spends an afternoon riding when he comes across a secluded Elizabethan manor house. He is allowed a tour by a servant and is accosted by the house's owner, who turns out to be a much bloated Bella, who has not been seen in London society for some years. Bella's transformation into a recluse is officially ascribed to ill health, though the actual reason is her having birthed Burnes's son out of wedlock, a fact she keeps secret from the father of her child.

Burnes is back in India, where he accompanies Lord Auckland to a rendezvous with Ranjit Singh, the founder of the Sikh Empire and a known enemy of Dost Mohammad, as well as Shah Shuja Durrani, a former king of Afghanistan whose throne Dost Mohammad had usurped. An indecisive and malleable bachelor who routinely demonstrates his personal power by making his entourage wait, Auckland intimates to the Sikh ruler that their two countries should jointly declare war on Dost Mohammad. Burnes is thereupon sent to Kabul, where he enjoys regular audiences with Dost Mohammad, who presses him for an alliance with Britain.

Burnes meets two other foreigners in Kabul. The first is Masson, who Burnes treats with overt dislike and condescension. The second is Vitkevich, who is being given the same treatment the Afghans had meted out to Burnes at the start of the book. Over an English-style Christmas dinner which the Afghans had rather effectively mimicked, Burnes is charmed by Vitkevich despite the Russian's unwavering dissimulation. Burnes does eventually learn of Vitkevich's mission in Kabul one day when Dost Mohammad asks him to ascertain the veracity of an official Russia letter offering a military alliance. Burnes consults Masson but ends up disparaging the other Englishman's perceived lack of honour, resolving to tell Dost Mohammad the truth even though Burnes knows the Russian offer to be one London is incapable of matching.

Back in England, Bella rides in her first ever train to return to London after a five-year absence. Her sister Elizabeth remains a spinster, any prospect of marriage having been rendered impossible on account of Bella being a single mother. One evening, the ladies attend a ball at a Duke's palace where a dance by the newly crowned Queen Victoria kicks things off. To her great surprise, Bella finds herself the second opening act as she is asked to dance by Lord John, the duke's heir. The aristocrat is a former suitor of hers and Bella immediately senses his continued attraction to her. She is temporarily left to her own devices as Lord John goes to mingle with the rest of the crowd, during which time she is accosted by Stokes, whose standing in society has gone up, as has his expenses (it no longer being appropriate for him to be seen commuting on foot and not by carriage, for example,). Lord John returns and takes the pair to see the latest acquisition of his antiquities-collecting father, an ancient parchment bearing a single Greek letter that the old duke has been led to believe to be a fragment of a poem by Sappho. The trio run into the Queen, who surprises them with her learning. Lord John pre-empts Stokes - who by now finds himself desiring marriage to a wealthy woman so that he may maintain his lifestyle - in asking for permission to court Bella. She declines, knowing full well the union's impossibility given that she's had a child out of wedlock.

The British invasion of Afghanistan proves easy to achieve. By the time the book returns to Burnes, Kabul has already been occupied for close to three years, the British having placed Shah Shuja on the Afghan throne while Dost Mohammad enjoys a courtly exile in British India. In the remote Afghan hills is the Dost's son, Akbar, who traverses the countryside from safehouse to safehouse, forever plotting the expulsion of the British when he is not busy fornicating with his male lover. That the British have not harmed Dost Mohammad is taken by the Afghans as a sign of weakness. Slowly Kabul becomes infiltrated by Akbar's relatives and followers.

Housed in a military cantonment outside of the city, the British army occupying Kabul finds itself in a state of constant boredom, its officers having to put up with a never-ending series of dull formal dinners hosted by their wives. As a diversion from the mundane repetitiveness of the men's everyday existence, a hunt is arranged to welcome Burnes's brother, Charles. A sergeant goes missing during the course of the pastime, but the man's disappearance is treated with the same levity Burnes and his companions had given the mysterious appearance of mulberry branches in their bedrooms.

The branches actually constitute a warning message from Akbar's followers. One night the two Burneses return home to their house inside the city. The next morning they wake up to find the house emptied of its servants. Both men are quick to grasp the severity of the situation, as the missing sergeant's severed head had been secreted into Burnes's bedroom. Outside a crowd gathers, its hostility palpable. Pacing around the house, Burnes soon finds a lone servant who claims to have been left behind by the others. The servant promises to lead the Britons to safety. Donning native disguise, their faces blackened, the brothers climb the back wall and are led through the crowd, unnoticed by the Afghans. Burnes is ultimately betrayed by the servant, who turns out to be the same Hassan Masson had bedded, and the crowd descend upon him, leaving his mutilated remains to be consumed by the city's stray dogs.

== Reception ==
The novel was noted for its pastiche of the writing styles of multiple 19th Century authors, including Dickens, Thackeray, and Gogol.

Toby Young, writing for The Guardian, praised the book for being "a great deal of fun" but deplored the lack of a plot, noting that "the story plays second fiddle to the literary high jinks" and that Hensher should have more carefully studied the authors he was parodying for a more compelling narrative. A review in The New York Times by Jason Goodwin was more charitable, describing the novel as a work that "hovers close to brilliance", its observations "acute" and characters "beautifully drawn". Robert McFarlane was equally fulsome, writing in the London Review of Books that the novel is " a triumph of style and research" and praising Hensher's writing as being "languidly sumptuous in its rhythms".
