= Days Without End (novel) =

2016 novel by Sebastian Barry

- First edition
- Author: Sebastian Barry
- Language: English
- Genre: Western fiction
- Published: 2016
- Publisher: Faber and Faber
- Publication place: Ireland
- Pages: 259
- ISBN: 9780571277018
- Dewey Decimal: 823.92
- Preceded by: The Temporary Gentleman

Days Without End is the seventh novel by Sebastian Barry and is set during the Indian Wars and American Civil War.

== Overview ==
The novel is narrated by Thomas McNulty, an Irish émigré who flees to Canada and then America to escape the Great Famine. In America he befriends John Cole and the two fall in love, working first, as young boys, as cross-dressing entertainers and then enlisting in the army and taking part in both the Indian Wars and the American Civil War.

== Inspiration ==
The novel follows The Whereabouts of Eneas McNulty, The Secret Scripture and The Temporary Gentleman in dealing with the McNulty family history. Thomas McNulty is a fictionalised version of a past relative of Sebastian Barry's who was said to have fought in the Indian Wars.

== Reception ==
The novel was awarded the Costa Book Award 2016. The judges of the prize called it “A miracle of a book – both epic and intimate – that manages to create spaces for love and safety in the noise and chaos of history.” It won the 2017 Walter Scott Prize, and was selected by Time magazine as one of its top ten novels of 2017.

In 2019, Days Without End was ranked 74th on The Guardian's list of the 100 best books of the 21st century.

On November 5, 2019, the BBC News listed Days Without End on its list of the 100 most influential novels.
