= Rathcoran =

Ancient monument in County Wicklow, Ireland

- Ráth Cuaráin (Irish)
- Location in Ireland
- 52.947028°N 6.683191°W
- Type: passage tomb and hillfort
- Location: Baltinglass Hill, Baltinglass, County Wicklow, Ireland

History
- Built: Grave: c. 3500 BC; Ringfort: c. 1000 BC

Site notes
- Elevation: 383 m (1,257 ft)
- Area: Slaney Valley

National monument of Ireland
- Official name: Baltinglass Hill Passage Tomb and Hillfort
- Reference no.: 328

Rathcoran (Irish: Ráth Cuaráin) is an ancient passage tomb and surrounding hillfort atop Baltinglass Hill, County Wicklow, Ireland. The passage tomb is contemporaneous with Newgrange, i.e. it was built 3500–3000 BC, during the Neolithic. The ringfort dates to the Bronze Age, c. 1000 BC. It is part of the Baltinglass hillfort complex, and is a National Monument.

== Location ==
Rathcoran is located atop Baltinglass Hill, 2 km (1.2 mi) east-northeast of Baltinglass, overlooking the River Slaney.

== History ==
The passage grave is thought to be contemporaneous with Newgrange, i.e. it was built 3500–3000 BC, during the Neolithic.

The site was excavated in 1934-1936 by P. T. Walshe, revealing evidence of the cremations of at least 3 adults and a child. Fragments of quartz unearthed during the excavation suggest that it was used for decoration. Carbonised hazelnuts, wheat grains and a saddle quern point to the extent of local climate change: in Neolithic Ireland, the climate was drier and warmer, County Wicklow's glens were densely wooded, and farmers could grow crops at altitudes above 300 m (980 ft).

Five hillforts surround Baltinglass. Rathcoran, atop Baltinglass Hill is dated to 1000 BC or slightly earlier: during the Bronze Age. The name is from the Irish Ráth Cuaráin ("Cuarán's ringfort"), but this name is doubtful: the original name could be Ráth Charnáin, "ringfort of the cairn."

== Description ==
=== Passage tomb ===
The passage tomb survives as a multi-period kerbed cairn with a diameter of 27 m (89 ft), underneath which are five structures:

- A kerb of large stones surround the cairn, and an inner kerb was revealed during excavation. Two stones of the inner kerb and one of the outer bear passage tomb art.
- The main tomb is on the north side. It has a short passage, 3.2 m (10 ft) long, roofed with slabs and leading to a chamber 2 m (6 ft 7 in) in diameter which contains three shallow recesses and a stone basin with a smooth concave surface.
- On the south side of the cairn is another tomb comprising a chamber divided into three compartments, but no passage, and two of its stones bear passage tomb art.
- On the northwest side of the cairn are the remains of a small corbelled structure, partly overlain by the inner kerb.
- A fifth chamber stands inside the kerb to the east of the main tomb.

The finds from the site include the cremated bones of at least three adults and one child, flint scrapers, Carrowkeel pottery and bone pins. Finds from beneath the cairn included a stone axe, a flint javelin-head, scrapers, an egg-shaped stone, carbonised wheat grains and hazelnuts. A saddle quern was also found in the cairn.

=== Hillfort ===
The Rathcoran hillfort, a bivallate ringfort, is at the top of Baltinglass Hill, and surrounds the cairn. Stones from the cairn were moved to make a protective wall. It has a double rampart and perhaps was intended to have a third, which is incompleted. It encloses a roughly oval shape, around 400 m (440 yd) at its widest point.
