= Philip Hensher =

English novelist, critic and journalist (born 1965)

- Born: Philip Michael Hensher; 20 February 1965 (age 61); South London, England
- Education: Lady Margaret Hall, Oxford; Jesus College, Cambridge
- Occupations: Novelist, critic and journalist

Philip Michael Hensher FRSL (born 20 February 1965) is an English novelist, critic and journalist.

== Biography ==
Son of Raymond J. and Miriam Hensher, his father a bank manager and composer and his mother a university librarian, Hensher was born in South London,, although he spent the majority of his childhood and adolescence in Sheffield, attending Tapton School. He did his undergraduate degree at Lady Margaret Hall, Oxford, before attending Jesus College, Cambridge, where he was awarded a PhD in 1992 for work on 18th-century painting and satire.

Early in his career he worked as a clerk in the House of Commons, from which he was fired over the content of an interview he gave to a gay magazine. He has published a number of novels, and is a regular contributor, columnist and book reviewer for newspapers and weeklies such as The Guardian, The Spectator, The Mail on Sunday and The Independent.

The Bedroom of the Mister's Wife (1999) brings together 14 of his short stories, including "Dead Languages", which A. S. Byatt selected for her Oxford Book of English Short Stories (1998), making Hensher the youngest author included in the anthology.

He is Professor of Creative Writing at Bath Spa University, formerly Bath College of Higher Education. From 2005 to 2012 he taught creative writing at the University of Exeter. He has edited new editions of numerous classic works of English literature, including novels by Charles Dickens and Nancy Mitford. Hensher has also served as a judge for the Booker Prize.

He was elected a Fellow of the Royal Society of Literature in 1998. Since 2000 Philip Hensher has been listed as one of the 100 most influential LGBT people in Britain, and in 2003 he was selected as one of Granta's twenty Best of Young British Novelists.

In 2002, his novel The Mulberry Empire was longlisted for the Man Booker Prize. In 2008 Hensher's semi-autobiographical novel The Northern Clemency was shortlisted for the prize. In 2012 he won first prize in the German Travel Writers Award and was shortlisted for the Green Carnation Prize. He also won the Stonewall Prize for the Journalist of the Year in 2007 and the Somerset Maugham Award for his novel Kitchen Venom in 1996.

In 2013, his novel Scenes from Early Life was shortlisted for the Green Carnation Prize, and awarded the Ondaatje Prize. It is based on his husband's childhood against the backdrop of the war of independence in Bangladesh.

Hensher wrote the libretto for Thomas Adès's opera Powder Her Face (1995) and in 2015 he edited The Penguin Book of the British Short Story.

Hensher's early works of fiction were characterized as having an "ironic, knowing distance from their characters" and "icily precise skewerings of pretension and hypocrisy". His historical novel The Mulberry Empire "echoes with the rhythm and language of folk tales" while "play[ing] games" with narrative forms.

Hensher served on the jury for the 2018 Scotiabank Giller Prize.

Hensher is married to Zaved Mahmood, a human rights lawyer at the United Nations.

== Works ==
Among Hensher's novels are:

- Other Lulus (1994)
- Kitchen Venom (1996)
- Pleasured (1998)
- The Mulberry Empire (2002), Flamingo/HarperPerennial. Longlisted for the Man Booker Prize.
- The Fit (2004) 4th Estate/HarperPerennial
- The Northern Clemency (2008), HarperCollins/4th Estate. Shortlisted for the Man Booker Prize.
- King of the Badgers (31 March 2011), 4th Estate, ISBN 978-0-00-730133-1
- Scenes from Early Life (12 April 2012), 4th Estate, ISBN 978-0007433704. Winner of the Royal Society of Literature's Ondaatje Prize (2013)
- The Emperor Waltz (3 July 2014), 4th Estate
- The Friendly Ones (8 February 2018), 4th Estate
- A Small Revolution in Germany (6 February 2020), 4th Estate
- To Battersea Park (30 March 2023), 4th Estate

He has also published two short story collections:

- The Bedroom of the Mister's Wife (1999)
- Tales of Persuasion (2016), 4th Estate, ISBN 978-0-00-745963-6

Non-fiction:

- A History of the Novel in Britain (3 September 2026), Pelican

Belles lettres:

- The Missing Ink: The Lost Art of Handwriting (2012)
- (edited) The Penguin Book of the British Short Story (2015)
- (edited) The Penguin Book of the Contemporary British Short Story (2018)
