= A Fraction of the Whole =

2008 novel by Steve Toltz

- Author: Steve Toltz
- Language: English
- Genre: Novel
- Publisher: Hamish Hamilton, Australia
- Publication date: 2008
- Publication place: Australia
- Media type: Print (Hardback & Paperback)
- Pages: 711pp
- ISBN: 978-0-241-01529-2 (hardback)
- OCLC: 192043157

A Fraction of the Whole is a 2008 debut novel by Australian writer Steve Toltz. It follows three generations of the eccentric Dean family in Australia and the people who surround them.

== Characters ==
=== Jasper Dean ===
Jasper Dean is Martin Dean's illegitimate son and Terry Dean's nephew. He narrates most of the novel, save some sections which are narrated instead by Martin. Jasper's difficult relationship with his father is the central subject of the book, and he leads a confused childhood due to Martin's constant bizarre lessons and diatribes. His central conflict is a fear of turning into his father, and he often works to distance himself from Martin, though their bond is strangely loving in its own way.

=== Martin Dean ===
Martin Dean, the father of Jasper Dean, is paranoid, philosophical, and intelligent. As a child, he spent four years and four months in a coma; upon waking up, the resulting unfamiliarity with the world led to his later misanthropy. Martin is transfixed by his inevitable death and will stop at nothing to leave his mark on the world; this leads to a series of "immortality projects" which inevitably end up backfiring. He is also determined to indoctrinate his son Jasper with his beliefs.

=== Terry Dean ===
Terry Dean is Martin's younger half-brother. He is described as blond and handsome. He grew up as a natural athlete who loved sports with a religious fervor, hating all cheaters. When Terry is injured and can no longer take part in any sport, he turns to a life of crime, going from juvenile delinquency to a vigilante crusade against every cheating athlete in Australia. He is eventually captured, and later presumed dead when a brushfire burns down his prison.

=== Caroline Potts ===
She is a childhood love of both Martin and Terry and the daughter of the richest man in the town where they grew up. She leaves to travel the world, returning for her father when he is blinded in an explosion caused by Terry. She eventually reappears, marrying Martin when they are both middle-aged.

=== Astrid ===
Jasper's mother was accidentally impregnated by Martin after they had a chance meeting on New Year's. Though Martin initially loves her, he becomes more and more exasperated with her as she sinks into depression during pregnancy. Jasper has never met her.

=== Eddie ===
A longtime friend of Martin's; they met in Paris. Jasper is suspicious of Eddie, as he takes long, unexplained vacations, constantly lends Martin money, and is always taking pictures of them. Eddie is trained as a doctor and dreams of returning to his home in Thailand to start a practice.

=== Anouk ===
She is a beautiful woman whom Martin hires as a housekeeper after catching her keying his car. Her attempts to point out Martin's flaws lead to his psychological breakdown, but she becomes a voice of sanity who stays on to help the Dean family. She is constantly in the middle of a nasty breakup and is versed in meditation.

=== Harry West ===
This hardened criminal resides in the prison that overlooks Martin and Terry's hometown. Martin hires Harry to act as a mentor for Terry's fledgling criminal operation. As Harry's sanity deteriorates, Martin becomes his only confidante. Harry asks him for help in publishing his vision, a textbook for criminals.

=== Martin's parents ===
The couple are never named in the book. Martin and Terry's mother is a Jewish immigrant who migrated to Australia by way of Shanghai after the end of World War II. It had been a center of many European Jewish refugees. She loses Martin's father when he is shot.

Later she remarries again and has a second son, Terry Dean. She is devoted to both sons. Terry's father is an alcoholic who moved with his wife to a small town in New South Wales when he found work building a prison. He blames Martin for sending Terry down the wrong path in life, and has an uneasy relationship with Martin.

== Plot ==
A Fraction of the Whole uses a multi-perspective narrative, often going back in time to show Martin's perspective on events before returning to Jasper's story in the present. The framing narrative of the novel is written from the perspective of Jasper, writing secretly from the prison cell where he is incarcerated for an initially undisclosed crime.

=== Martin enters ===
The story jumps back to when Jasper was five, and was pulled out of school by his father, Martin. Rather than using a typical school curriculum, Martin teaches his son his beliefs about how life is, how it should be, and how to survive it.

=== Martin's childhood ===
Martin gives Jasper a highly detailed account of his own childhood. He has dealt with many problems in his life, from Terry's criminal behavior, to Martin's own depression, to his four-year coma, to his mother poisoning him while she went mad from fear of her terminal cancer. Martin clearly remembers telling his brother that the two criminal kids, whom Terry would later join, are cheating. These kids had been beating Martin up, and he knows that telling Terry this lie would make him go after them. Terry does go after the bullies, and they stab him in the leg. This injury cripples Terry for life and renders him incapable of playing sports.

Martin comes up with the idea of a suggestion box, where everyone in town is welcome to enter recommendations for town life. It starts off well, but soon everyone in town is criticized by someone else. Each slip is anonymous, making it impossible for anyone to get mad, except at the person who invented the suggestion box. No one ever finds out that it was Martin. Finally, there is the loss of Martin's true love, Caroline, to Terry. After Terry is imprisoned, she leaves the town and visits every now and then.

Martin's mother is diagnosed with cancer, and Martin vows that he won't leave her, effectively trapping himself in the town he hates. After the town burns down, killing his mother and stepfather, and destroying the prison, he leaves town for good, having wanted to for so many years. Before he leaves he collects what he believes to be his brother's ashes from the prison, and scatters them in a puddle.

=== Martin's young adulthood ===
Martin leaves his hometown in Australia for Paris. He has picked Paris because he figures that he may as well start where he believes Caroline Potts to be. He has traced the postcard he has received from her to the original address. Upon arrival, he learns that she has recently moved, and no one is quite sure where.

Martin decides to live in Paris, where he meets two important people. Eddie comes off as a very friendly Thai who loves to take pictures and constantly takes Martin's photograph. Eddie is not the type of person Martin likes and he decides never to see him again but Eddie becomes his dearest and longest friend. Eddie is always there for Martin, giving him jobs and money when he needs it. q Martin also meets Astrid (real name or origin unknown) in a café. He finds her extremely attractive and assumes that his affair with her will be a one-night stand, but in fact it becomes the exact opposite. Astrid and Martin move in together, and Astrid unexpectedly becomes pregnant.

During her pregnancy, Astrid becomes mentally ill. She repeatedly paints a violent and horrific face and trying to converse with God. She becomes angry when God does not respond, so Martin starts pretending to be him, answering her questions while hiding in the bathroom. He learns a great deal about her, and realizes that she is becoming suicidal. After giving birth to Jasper, Astrid commits suicide.

=== Middle ===
Eddie continues to help the Dean family financially. The Deans meet another central character, Anouk. Although they meet on undesirable grounds (Anouk vandalizes Martin's car), they become close family friends, as Martin hires Anouk to clean for them.

Martin is deemed mentally unstable and is sent to mental institution. Jasper (Martin's child with Astrid) is sent to a foster home against his will.

When Martin is released, he buys a rotting, broken-down house in the middle of nowhere. With Eddie's money, Martin builds a house and labyrinth on the property to have maximum privacy. Jasper, in high school, meets the Towering Inferno (real name unknown) and starts a physical affair with her. She is Jasper's first girlfriend, but everything ends in shambles when Jasper discovers that she is having an affair with her ex-boyfriend, Brian the newscaster.

Finally, with the assistance of Anouk ( they begin to sleep with each other), Martin finds his purpose in life: to tell his ideas. Jasper left home after he finds out about Martin and Anouk and rents an empty studio.

=== Millionaire ===
Martin comes up with a way to make everyone in Australia a millionaire, using a system similar to a lottery. He proposes the idea to Anouk, who helps get it approved by the most wealthy man in Australia and his son, both of whom are in charge of the nation's network of tabloids and paparazzi artists.

Anouk eventually marries Oscar, the son. They feature ,him on the covers of all the newspapers. Martin becomes the most beloved person in the country, except for Terry. People often refer to Martin in terms of being Terry's brother. This annoys Martin, but he is happy to know he is famous now.

Out of the few randomly selected winners, Caroline, his true love from his childhood, is picked. Right before the ceremony, they get engaged, as do Anouk and Oscar, the son of the wealthy man.

While presenting the first millionaires, Martin declares that he is running for prime minister. Being beloved so much despite his foul speech, he is elected by a landslide so he continues his weird proposals make true in the country. With Eddie at his side helping with the lottery, it seems that nothing can go wrong, but eventually everything does.

=== Fraud ===
Soon after Martin's victory, he, Jasper and Caroline are living happily. It is discovered that Eddie has committed fraud in the lottery; he has fixed the process, setting it up so Caroline and all of his friends would win. When the story gets out, (Jasper revealed it to Towering Inferno and she told Brian, who covers the story as his great career comeback) Martin becomes the most hated man in Australia. He is forced to leave the country.

=== Deans in Thailand ===
After escaping to Thailand, with Eddie leading the way, Jasper, Caroline and Martin have no idea where they are going. They had never suspected that someone had been paying Eddie to be friendly to Jasper and Martin, yet he has hated them the entire time. It turns out that Terry has been alive after all. He has not been killed in the fire, but instead has just run away and employed Eddie to give money to the Deans and take photographs.

Terry has become very fat, and is the head of an entire criminal group. He has also forgotten about love, but instead has three prostitutes as friends whom he hires almost every night.

Soon afterwards it is revealed that Caroline is having an affair with Terry. Martin is dying of cancer, Eddie has gone completely crazy, and Jasper tries to get the family back together. Eddie, desperate to make his dead parents proud, tries to resume his pre-Dean career of being a doctor, but finds that the local population are happy with their existing doctor and his apprentice.

He poisons them and upon discovery the village turns on Eddie and all of the Deans. Eddie and Caroline are killed. With Martin dying from his cancer, he says he wants to die in Australia. Jasper decides to return with him.

=== Boat trip to Australia ===
Terry arranges it for Jasper and Martin to be smuggled back to Australia on a smuggling boat. On their return Jasper and Martin bond for the very first time. They enjoy each other's company and understand each other better. Just when Australia comes in sight, Martin dies smiling. He receives a burial at sea, just as he had requested. Jasper is arrested on the boat's arrival by immigration. He is put in a detention center, (as shown in the first chapter) where he grieves for his father.

=== Jasper's Future ===
Eventually Jasper reveals who he is and he is released after a series of inquiries about his father and confirmation of his death. The authorities take him to a storage room where Martin's belongings have been held.

Jasper is convinced it is mostly junk but discovers Martin's diaries, on which some of the book is based, and paintings of a face painted by his mother. He realizes he's seen and drawn this face before and has been haunted by it.

Jasper also realizes that he will not become his father - his greatest fear - because his mother is part of him as well. He sets off to Europe in search of his mother's past. he buys a plane ticket to Czech Republic, with financial assistance from Anouk. She has become the richest woman in Australia after inheriting money from her husband and father-in-law, who have died in a jet crash.

== Reception ==
The novel received generally positive reviews.

A review by Kyle Smith in The Wall Street Journal called A Fraction of the Whole "a riotously funny first novel by Australian Steve Toltz that is harder to ignore than a crate of puppies, twice as playful and just about as messy."

The Courier Mail's Lon Bram said that "every sentence is a quotable aphorism clothed in light-hearted observations about human behaviour", and called it "a 700-page modern classic."

Tina Jordan of Entertainment Weekly gave the novel a grade of "B", saying that "sometimes Jasper is laugh-out-loud funny. But just as often, his recollections are too dense and long-winded to penetrate."

The New York Times review by John Freeman was more negative, saying that while "there are a few nice moments", the novel "tries to create friction between Martin’s and Jasper’s different renditions of events, but this fails because they sound the same."

== Awards and nominations ==
- Ned Kelly Awards for Crime Writing, Best First Novel, 2008: shortlisted
- Man Booker Prize (UK), 2008: shortlisted
- Miles Franklin Literary Award, 2009: longlisted
- New South Wales Premier's Literary Awards, 2009: Winner of People's Choice Award for Fiction
