= The Clothes on Their Backs =

Book by Linda Grant

- First edition
- Author: Linda Grant
- Language: English
- Published: 2008
- Publisher: Little, Brown
- Publication date: November 25, 2008
- Pages: 293
- Awards: Orange, shortlisted for Man Booker 2008
- ISBN: 978-1439142363

The Clothes on Their Backs is a novel by Linda Grant that was shortlisted for the Man Booker Prize in 2008 and recipient of an Orange Prize. It was first published in 2008.

== Plot summary ==
A quiet, sensitive girl who loves to read grows up in a very quiet environment. Vivien Kovacs is raised by Hungarian parents who have been quite silenced by the war and thus she seems to be removed from both the past and present. So she uses her books to reinvent herself through her favorite characters. That is, until Uncle Sandor appears on the scene.

This uncle comes clad in a diamond watch, mohair suit and accompanied by a girl wearing a leopard-skin hat. He wants to share his life story with Vivien, telling her all about her family’s past. Vivien’s parents do not take well to this intruder. But Vivien wants to know why.

That is just the plot. Throughout the pages the readers learn about heroism, survival and betrayals and how our clothes define our personalities.

== Themes ==
Major themes in The Clothes on Their Back – set in 1970s London – are survival and betrayal, post-war, childhood and becoming the person we all need to become. Survival takes on many forms, including childhood, dealing with parents who are trying to survive the trauma of post-war.

== Awards ==
The Clothes on Their Backs received the Orange Prize and was shortlisted for the 2008 Man Booker prize.

== Acclaim ==
Grant’s writing in this book has been described as “spectacularly humanizing.” She writes in “vivid and supple prose [creating] a powerful story of family, love, and the hold the past has on the present."

According to a review in The Observer, “There is nothing lightweight about its themes and yet it is so artfully constructed that you barely feel you're reading it at all, so fluid and addictive is the plot.” The Evening Standard described the book as being: "Gripping and written with keen understatement, it manages to be a domestic coming-of-age story even as it takes in the tumultuous sweep of the twentieth century.” A review in The Sunday Telegraph said: "Like money, clothes have real, symbolic and psychological value. Linda Grant understands these dimensions implicitly. Stitched beautifully into the fabric of her latest novel is an acute understanding of the role clothes play in reflecting identity and self-worth.... Grant's own particular beam reveals the way we acquire our sense of self from what gets reflected back to us, either in the mirror or in our relationships with others. She is at home writing about the thrilling ripple of a skirt as she is charting social tensions.”

The Sunday Times praised the novel's complexity and exploration of clothing and identity. The Independent praised its characterisation and treatment of family history, while The Daily Telegraph responded favourably to its narrative and portrayal of Sándor. In a separate review for The Independent, Vera Rule praised Grant's depiction of London but criticised the plotting and found the descriptions of clothing unconvincing.
