= Annie Dunne =

2002 novel by Sebastian Barry

- First edition
- Author: Sebastian Barry
- Language: English
- Publisher: Faber & Faber
- Publication date: 2002
- Pages: 256
- ISBN: 978-0-14-200287-2
- Preceded by: The Steward of Christendom
- Followed by: A Long Long Way

Annie Dunne is a novel written by author and playwright Sebastian Barry. First published by Faber and Faber in 2002 it is currently under reprint from Penguin Books. Set in rural Ireland in the late 1950s the novel recounts the life of Annie, who having been made homeless after the death of her sister is forced to move to a farm in County Wicklow.

== Synopsis ==
The protagonist Annie, who was the central character in Barry`s play The Steward of Christendom is seen at first living with her sickly sister and caring for her brother-in-law. After the death of her sister the brother-in-law remarries, making Annie homeless. She moves to live with her cousin Sarah in a remote farm. When the pair are in their sixties, Annie's nephew asks her to care for his two children, a girl and a boy, as he leaves for England in 1960 to search for work. The book describes the events of the summer as Annie delights in playing the role of a mother, but also feels threatened by the prospect of her cousin marrying a local farmhand, thus leaving her homeless once again.

== Reception ==
The novel has received mixed reviews. Eamonn Sweeney writing in The Guardian compared the book to the Samuel Beckett play Waiting for Godot saying "Waiting for Godot has been described as a play in which nothing happens, twice. Annie Dunne is a novel in which nothing happens many times." Emily Gordon writing in The New York Times called it "a fine novel" and that the prose was "close to poetry". Tony Mastrogiorgio for the San Francisco Chronicle wrote the book was a "superb new novel" although says there "was there is a brief flickering of regret at first impressions" he says "that brief doubt is replaced by what can only be described as wonder." And describes Annie as "one of the most memorable women in Irish fiction"

== Bibliography ==
- Barr Sebastian. Annie Dunne Penguin Books. Reissue. May 2003. ISBN 978-0-14-200287-2
- Christina Hunt Mahony. Out of history: essays on the writings of Sebastian Barry Carysfort Press. February 2006. ISBN 978-1-904505-18-1
- Stade George. Encyclopedia of British Writers, 1800 to the Present, Volume 1 Facts On File. 2nd Revised ed. 15 April 2009. ISBN 978-0-8160-7385-6
- Pierce David. Irish writing in the twentieth century: a reader Cork University Press. 1 January 2001. ISBN 978-1-85918-258-1
