= Steve Toltz =

Australian novelist

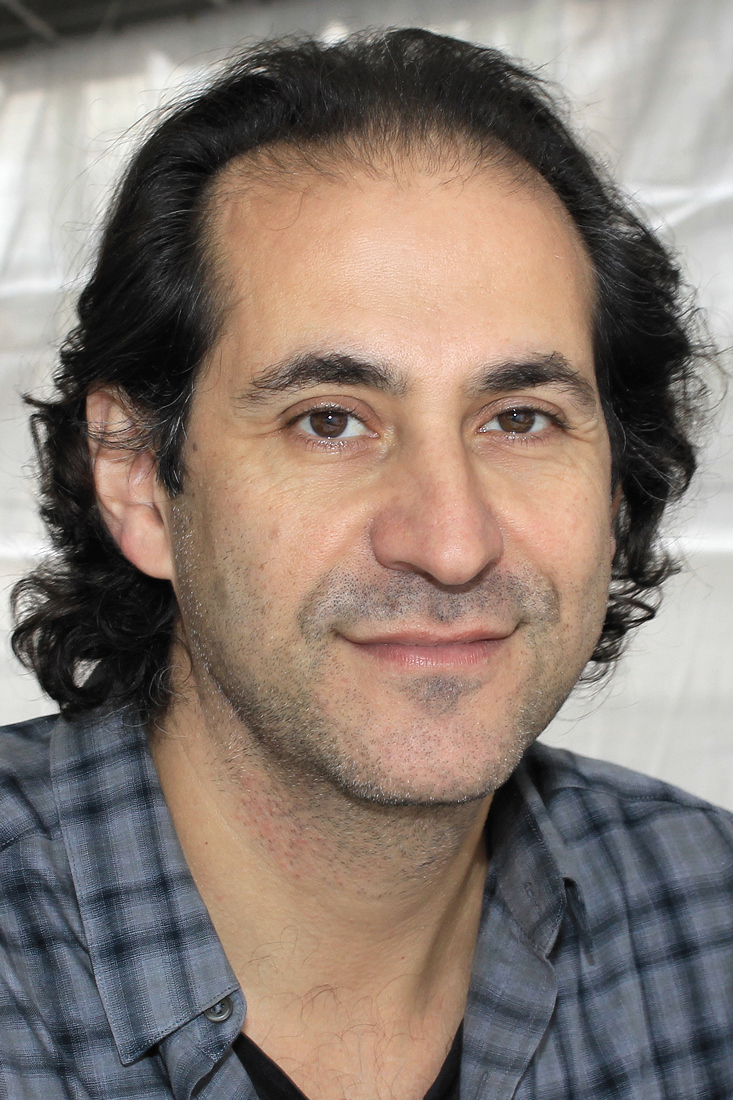
- Toltz at the 2016 Texas Book Festival
- Born: 1972 (age 53–54); Sydney, New South Wales, Australia
- Occupation: Author

Steve Toltz (born 1972 in Sydney) is an Australian novelist.

== Early life and education ==
Toltz attended Killara High School and graduated from the University of Newcastle, New South Wales, in 1994. Prior to his literary career, he lived in Montreal, Vancouver, New York City, Barcelona, and Paris, variously working as a cameraman, telemarketer, security guard, private investigator, English teacher, and screenwriter.

== Works ==
A Fraction of the Whole, his first novel, was released in 2008 to widespread critical acclaim. It is a comic novel which tells the history of a family of Australian outcasts. The narration of the novel alternates between Jasper Dean, a philosophical, idealistic boy, who grows up throughout the novel and his father, Martin Dean, a philosopher and shut-in described at the start of the novel as "the most hated man in all of Australia". This is in contrast with Terry Dean, Jasper's uncle, whom Jasper describes as "the most beloved man in all of Australia". The novel spans the entirety of Martin's life and several years after (a range never specified in the text, but starting after World War II and ending in the early 2000s), and is set in Australia, Paris, and Thailand.

The novel has repeatedly been compared favourably to John Kennedy Toole's Pulitzer Prize winning novel A Confederacy of Dunces. A Fraction of the Whole was shortlisted for the 2008 Man Booker Prize and the 2008 Guardian First Book Award.

His second novel, Quicksand, published in 2015, won the Russell Prize, while his third, Here Goes Nothing, was longlisted for the 2022 Nib Literary Award. His fourth novel, A Rising of the Lights, was published in 2026.

== Bibliography ==
- A Fraction of the Whole (2008)
- Quicksand (2015)
- Here Goes Nothing (2022)
- A Rising of the Lights (2026)
