= The Northern Clemency =

2008 novel, shortlisted for the Booker Prize

First edition (publ. Fourth Estate)

The Northern Clemency is a book by Philip Hensher written in 2008 and shortlisted for the Booker Prize that year. It is a 600-page story set in the northern English city of Sheffield and examines the beginning of Margaret Thatcher’s Britain in the 1970s, the time of the 1980s and the Tony Blair Britain of the 1990s. It was named Amazon’s Best Book of 2008.
