= The Steward of Christendom =

Play by Sebastian Barry

- First edition (publ. Methuen Drama)
- Original language: English
- Written by: Sebastian Barry
- Characters: Thomas Dunne; Annie; Matt; Recruit; Maud; Dolly; Wille; Mrs O'Dea; Smith
- Series: Dunne Family saga
- Genre: historical fiction, trauma fiction
- Setting: A county home in Baltinglass, 1932

Premiere
- Date: March 30, 1995
- Place: Royal Court Theatre (Upstairs), London

The Steward of Christendom is a 1995 play written by Irish playwright Sebastian Barry. It focuses on Thomas Dunne, loosely based on Barry's great-grandfather, the former chief superintendent of the Dublin Metropolitan Police, now (1932) confined to a psychiatric facility. The play recounts Dunne's personal and public life throughout the 1910s and into the early 1920s.

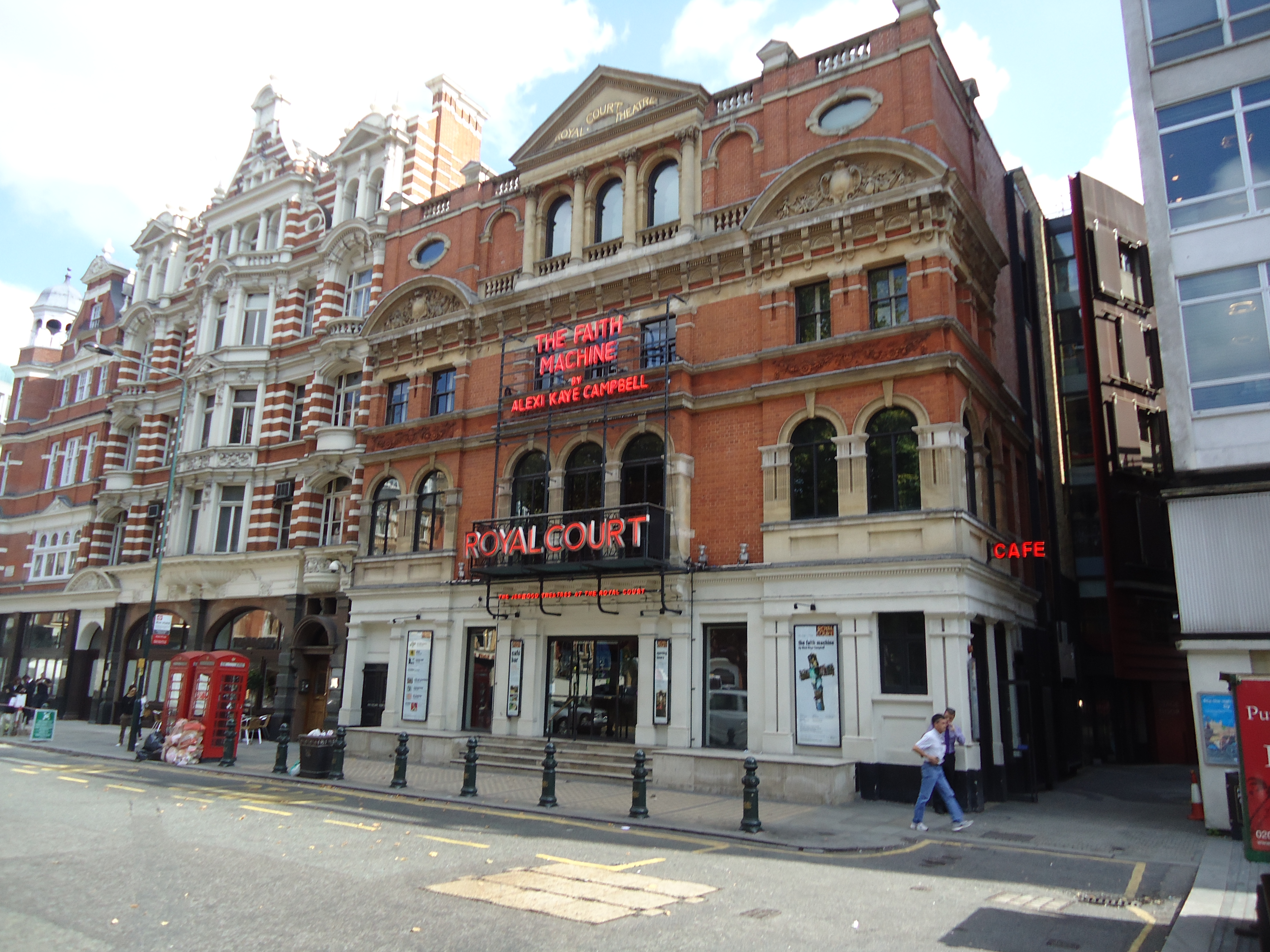
The Royal Court Theatre, Sloane Square, London, site of the play's 1995 premiere.

== Plot summary ==
The play opens in a county home (an inpatient psychiatric facility) in Baltinglass, Ireland in 1932, some years after Irish independence. In the opening scene, Dunne appears to be raving incoherently, reliving an episode of his childhood. As the play continues, Dunne slips from moments of lucidity to reliving parts of his career as a senior officer in the Dublin Metropolitan Police (DMP), especially the handover of Dublin Castle to Michael Collins in 1922 after the signing of the Anglo-Irish Treaty. He also relives memories of his family, particularly his daughters, Annie, Maud, and Dolly. Dunne is also visited by the ghost of his son Willie, killed in WWI; Willie's ghost appears to him in the form a 13-year-old child but dressed in the soldier's uniform of his 18-year-old self.

These imagined visitations and reveries are interspersed by actual interactions between Dunne and two attendants from the county home, Mrs. O'Dea and Smith, who attempt to wash him and measure him for a new suit of clothes. Smith initially berates Dunne for his role in the DMP, particularly his ordering of the charge against the striking workers during the Dublin Lock-out in 1913 that left four dead; however, he warms up to Dunne after reading a letter written to him by his son from the battlefield. Mrs. O'Dea demonstrates more sympathy to him, eventually sewing some gold thread into Dunne's suit, as he frequently pleads for.

The play mainly alternates between the dramatized memories of 1922 and Dunne's present, mentally deteriorated state at the county home in 1932. It does, however, contain one actual visit from Annie and Dunne's son-in-law, Matthew. It consists largely of monologues from Dunne which serve to explain his past loyalties and decisions, before ending with the depiction of the traumatic event that started Dunne's downward spiral into madness: he brandished a sword at Annie and destroyed various pieces of furniture in her house after hearing of Michael Collins's death and the increased violence in the country due to the Irish Civil War. The play concludes with Dunne recounting a story from his childhood about the family sheepdog killing and eating one of the sheep. Dunne's father initially threatens to kill the dog as punishment, but much to young Dunne's relief, the father decides ultimately to spare the dog, which suggests that a similar forgiveness can be extended to Dunne despite his personal and public mistakes.

== Quotes ==
"A soldier doesn't always make a good policeman. There's too much–sorrow–in a soldier." (16)

"My father was the steward of Humewood, and I was the steward of Christendom." (33)

"There was never enough gold in that uniform. If I had made commissioner I might have had gold, but that wasn’t a task for a Catholic." (10)

“I loved her as long as she lived, I loved her as much as I loved Cissy my wife, and maybe more, or differently.“ (15)

== See also ==
- Annie Dunne
