= Liam Price =

Irish judge and historian (1891–1967)

- Born: 1891
- Died: 1967 (aged 75–76)
- Occupation: Judge

Liam Price (February 1891 – 1967) was a County Wicklow judge, historian and former president of the Royal Society of Antiquaries of Ireland (RSAI) who published work on historical topography and the history of placenames, especially for the county of Wicklow, where he was a district justice. His work on these areas has been published in journals and books and his contribution, totalling about 40 papers, was acknowledged in a special issue of the Journal of the Royal Society of Antiquaries of Ireland in 1965, shortly before his death in 1967.

== Education and employment ==
Price attended Aldenham School in Hertfordshire, England, before studying at Trinity College Dublin where he was awarded a senior moderatorship in Classics and the Vice-Chancellor's Latin Medal for his study of Lucretius. He was called to the bar in 1919 where he practiced in Dáil Courts until the foundation of the Irish Free State. He was appointed district justice in 1922 and practices in Carlow, Kilkenny, and Mullingar. He was assigned to the Wicklow district in 1924, a position he retained until retirement in 1960. He was conferred with an honorary doctorate in 1965 from University College Dublin.

== Professional associations ==
- Member of the National Monuments Advisory Council
- Member of the Archaeological Exploration Committee of the Royal Irish Academy
- Member of the Irish Folklore Commission
- Member of the Board of Visitors of the National Museum of Ireland
- Member of the Irish Place-names Commission
- Member 1926–1933; fellow 1934–1959; honorary life fellow from 1959; member of the council 1931–1934; honorary editor 1935–1944, 1957–1963; president 1949-1952 of the Royal Society of Antiquaries of Ireland

== Publications ==
=== Books ===
1. The Liam Price notebooks: the placenames, antiquities and topography of County Wicklow, Published by the Department of the Environment, Dublin, 2002.
2. The Place Names of County Wicklow (two parts published by Royal Irish Academy, subsequent 6 parts published by the Dublin Institute for Advanced Studies)

=== Selected journal articles ===
1. Hearth Money Rolls for County Wicklow - transcription of placenames appearing on Hearth Money Rolls dating from 1668.
2. The ages of stone and bronze in county Wicklow - details the archaeological evidence for settlements in South County Dublin and Wicklow including a series of sepulchral urns held at the National Museum of Ireland, one from Powerscourt, Co. Wicklow.
3. The antiquities and placenames of South County Dublin - draws information from the Down survey maps to describe various antiquities across the south of County Dublin, including Ballinascorney, Tallaght Hill and Saggart Hill
4. Powerscourt and the territory of Fercullen - describes the medieval history of North county Wicklow and the ancient territory of Fercullen, granted to the O'Tooles in 1540.
