= A Long Long Way =

Novel by Sebastian Barry

- First edition
- Author: Sebastian Barry
- Language: English
- Publisher: Viking Press
- Publication date: February 3, 2005
- Publication place: Ireland
- Media type: Print (Hardcover) & Paperback
- Pages: 292 pp
- ISBN: 0-670-03380-4
- OCLC: 57392246
- Dewey Decimal: 823/.914 22
- LC Class: PR6052.A729 L66 2005
- Preceded by: Annie Dunne
- Followed by: The Secret Scripture

A Long Long Way is a novel by Irish author Sebastian Barry, set during the First World War.

== Plot synopsis ==
The young protagonist Willie Dunne leaves Dublin to fight voluntarily for the Allies as a member of the Royal Dublin Fusiliers, leaving behind his prospective bride Gretta and his policeman father. He is caught between the warfare playing out on foreign fields (mainly at Flanders) and that festering at home, waiting to erupt with the Easter Rising.

== Reception ==
The novel was shortlisted for the Booker Prize in 2005.

In a 2009 US National Public Radio interview, author R. L. Stine stated that A Long Long Way was one of the most beautifully written books he had ever read, and gave copies of the novel to friends and family to read.
