= Sebastian Barry =

Irish novelist, playwright and poet

- Born: 5 July 1955 (age 71); Dublin, Ireland
- Occupations: Novelist, playwright
- Spouse: Alison Deegan
- Writing career
- Language: English
- Notable works: A Long Long Way; The Secret Scripture; On Canaan's Side; Days Without End
- Notable awards: James Tait Black Memorial Prize; 2008; Costa Book of the Year; 2008, 2017

Sebastian Barry (born 1955) is an Irish novelist, playwright and poet. He was named Laureate for Irish Fiction, 2018–2021. The French government named him a Chevalier des Arts et des Lettres in 2024. He is considered "one of Ireland’s most acclaimed and accomplished novelists", with "a distinctive place in contemporary Irish culture".

Barry's 2005 novel A Long Long Way was shortlisted for the Booker Prize. His follow-up novel, 2008's The Secret Scripture, won the James Tait Black Memorial Prize, the Costa Book of the Year and was shortlisted for the Booker Prize. His 2011 novel, On Canaan's Side, was longlisted for the Booker. Days Without End received the 2017 Costa Book of the Year, meaning Barry became the first novelist to win the prestigious prize twice.

== Early life and education ==
Barry was born in Dublin. His mother was acclaimed actress Joan O'Hara. One of Barry's grandfathers belonged to the British Army Corps of Royal Engineers. His other grandfather was a painter, a Nationalist, and a devotee of Éamon de Valera.

He was educated at Catholic University School and Trinity College Dublin, where he read English and Latin.

== Career ==
=== Academia ===
Barry's academic posts have included Honorary Fellow in Writing at the University of Iowa (1984), Heimbold Visiting Professor at Villanova University (2006) and Writer Fellow at Trinity College, Dublin (1995–1996).

=== Works ===
Barry's first literary publication was the novel Macker's Garden in 1982. His first play, The Pentagonal Dream, starred Olwen Fouéré and debuted in the Damer Theatre in March 1986. This was followed by several books of poetry and a further novel, The Engine of Owl-Light in 1987, before his career as a playwright began with his first play produced in the Abbey Theatre, Boss Grady's Boys, in 1988.

Barry's maternal great-grandfather, James Dunne, provided the inspiration for the main character in his most internationally known play, The Steward of Christendom (1995), which won the Christopher Ewart-Biggs Memorial Prize, the Lloyd's Private Banking Playwright of the Year Award and other awards. The main character, named Thomas Dunne in the play, was the chief superintendent of the Dublin Metropolitan Police from 1913 to 1922. He oversaw the area surrounding Dublin Castle until the Irish Free State takeover on 16 January 1922.

Both The Steward of Christendom and the novel The Whereabouts of Eneas McNulty (1998) are about the dislocations (physical and otherwise) of loyalist Irish people during the political upheavals of the early 20th century. The title character of the latter work is a young man forced to leave Ireland by his former friends in the aftermath of the Anglo-Irish War.

His novel A Long Long Way was shortlisted for the 2005 Man Booker Prize, and was selected for Dublin's 2007 One City One Book event. The novel tells the story of Willie Dunne, a young recruit to the Royal Dublin Fusiliers during the First World War. It brings to life the divided loyalty that many Irish soldiers felt at the time following the Easter Rising in 1916. Willie Dunne, son of the fictional Thomas Dunne, first appears as a minor but important character in The Steward of Christendom.

Barry's 2008 novel The Secret Scripture won the James Tait Black Memorial Prize for fiction (announced in August 2009), the oldest such award in the UK, the 2008 Costa Book of the Year (announced 27 January 2009), and (in French translation Le testament caché) the 2010 Cezam Prix Littéraire Inter CE. The Secret Scripture was also a favourite to win the 2008 Man Booker Prize, narrowly losing out to Aravind Adiga's The White Tiger.

Barry's play Andersen's English is inspired by children's writer Hans Christian Andersen coming to stay with Charles Dickens and his family in the Kent marshes. Directed by Max Stafford-Clark and produced by Out of Joint and Hampstead Theatre, the play toured in the UK from 11 February to 8 May 2010.

Our Lady of Sligo was directed in 1998 by Max Stafford-Clark at the Royal National Theatre, co−produced by Out of Joint.

On Canaan's Side, Barry's fifth novel, concerns Lily Bere, the sister of the character Willy Dunne from A Long Long Way and the daughter of the character Thomas Dunne from The Steward of Christendom, as she emigrates to the US. The novel was longlisted for the 2011 Man Booker Prize and won the 2012 Walter Scott Prize.

Barry's next novel, The Temporary Gentleman (2014), tells the story of Jack McNulty—an Irishman whose commission in the British army in WWII was never permanent. Sitting in his lodgings in Accra, Ghana, in 1957, he is writing the story of his life with desperate urgency. Barry's novel Days Without End followed in 2016. It won Costa Book of the Year 2017, the Walter Scott Prize, and The Independent Booksellers' Prize, and was longlisted for the 2017 Man Booker Prize.

Barry's 2023 novel, Old God’s Time, was shortlisted for the 2024 International Dublin Literary Award and longlisted for the 2023 Booker Prize. It won the Prix du Meilleur Livre Étranger in France in 2023.It also received Best Translated Crime Novel 2025 in Sweden.

His 2026 novel, The Newer World, chronicles the period after the American civil war.

== Personal life ==
Barry lives in County Wicklow with his wife, actor and screenwriter Alison Deegan.

In 2001, Barry established his personal and professional archive at the Harry Ransom Center at the University of Texas in Austin. More than 60 boxes of papers document his diverse writing career and range of creative output, which includes drawings, poetry, short stories, novels, essays, and scripts.

== Recognition and awards ==
Barry was elected a Fellow of the Royal Society of Literature in 2009. He is a member of Aosdána, having been elected in 1989. He has been awarded honorary degrees from the University of East Anglia (2010), NUI Galway (2012), and the Open University (2014).

He has an Alumni Award from Trinity College, Dublin, and in 2022 was made an honorary fellow of Trinity College.

Year	Title	Award	Category	Result	Ref
2005	A Long Long Way	Man Booker Prize	—	Shortlisted	
2008	The Secret Scripture	Costa Book Awards	Novel	Won	
2008	The Secret Scripture	Costa Book Awards	Book of the Year	Won	
2008	The Secret Scripture	James Tait Black Memorial Prize	—	Won	
2008	The Secret Scripture	Man Booker Prize	—	Shortlisted	
2010	The Secret Scripture	Cezam Prix Littéraire Inter CE	—	Won	
2011	On Canaan's Side	Man Booker Prize	—	Longlisted	
2012	On Canaan's Side	Walter Scott Prize	—	Won	
	Days Without End	Costa Book Awards	Novel	Won	
	Days Without End	Costa Book Awards	Book of the Year	Won	
	Days Without End	Independent Booksellers' Prize	—	Won	
	Days Without End	Man Booker Prize	—	Longlisted	
	Days Without End	Walter Scott Prize	—	Won	
2023	Old God's Time	Booker Prize		Longlisted	

== Works ==
=== Fiction ===
- Macker’s Garden (1982)
- The Engine of Owl-Light (1987)
- The Whereabouts of Eneas McNulty (1998)
- Annie Dunne (2002)
- A Long Long Way (2005)
- The Secret Scripture (2008)
- On Canaan's Side (2011)
- The Temporary Gentleman (2014)
- Days Without End (2016)
- A Thousand Moons (2020)
- Old God's Time (2023)
- The Newer World (2026)

=== Plays ===
- The Pentagonal Dream (1986)
- Boss Grady's Boys (1988)
- Prayers of Sherkin (1990)
- White Woman Street (1992)
- The Only True History of Lizzie Finn (1995)
- The Steward of Christendom (1995)
- Our Lady of Sligo (1998)
- Hinterland (2002)
- Whistling Psyche (2004)
- Fred and Jane (2004)
- The Pride of Parnell Street (2008)
- Dallas Sweetman (2008)
- Tales of Ballycumber (2009)
- Andersen's English (2010)
- On Blueberry Hill (2017)

=== Poetry ===
- The Water Colourist (Dolmen Press, 1983)
- The Rhetorical Town (Dolmen Press, 1985)
- Fanny Hawke Goes to the Mainland Forever (Raven Arts Press, 1989)
