= Lola Petticrew =

Irish actor (born 1995)

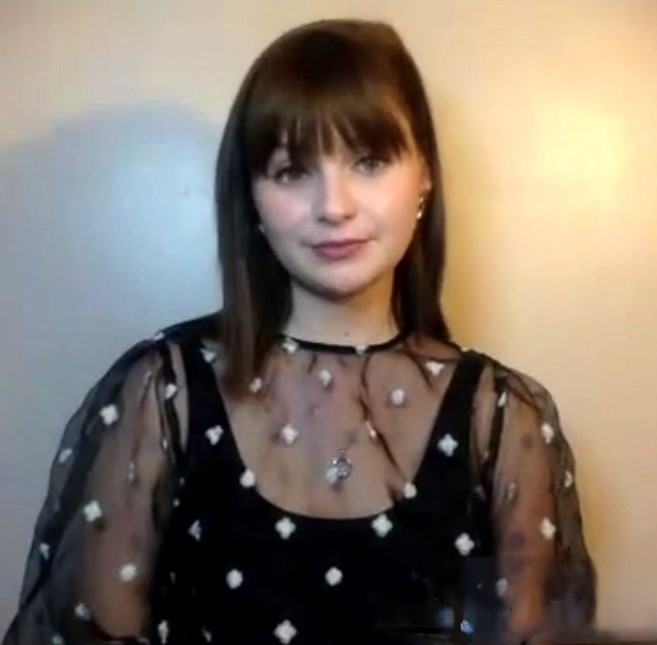
- Petticrew in 2020
- Born: 26 December 1995 (age 30); Belfast, Northern Ireland
- Education: Royal Welsh College of Music & Drama
- Occupation: Actor
- Years active: 2017–present

Lola Petticrew (born 26 December 1995) is an Irish actor. Their films include A Bump Along the Way (2019), Dating Amber (2020), and Tuesday (2023). On television, Petticrew is known for their roles in Bloodlands (2021–2022) and Three Families (2021) on BBC One, the FX series Say Nothing (2024), the Channel 4 series Trespasses (2025) and the Hulu series Furious (2026–). Petticrew has received two IFTA awards and a British Academy Television Award nomination.

== Early life and education ==
Petticrew was born on 26 December 1995. They are from the Ballymurphy area of west Belfast, Northern Ireland on a council estate, the eldest sibling to two sisters and a brother. Both their parents are healthcare workers.

Petticrew attended St Dominic's Grammar School for Girls, and joined a local drama group when they were 12. They are a childhood friend of fellow actor and Say Nothing co-star, Anthony Boyle, having collaborated on numerous productions.

Petticrew went on to train at the Royal Welsh College of Music & Drama, graduating in 2017 with a Bachelor of Arts in Acting.

== Career ==
Petticrew made their feature film debut as Allegra in the 2019 comedy-drama film A Bump Along the Way, which earned them a New Talent Award at the Galway Film Fleadh. They had more film roles in 2020, starring as the titular character in Dating Amber opposite Fionn O'Shea, and playing Jessica and Alex in Here Are the Young Men and Shadows respectively. They appeared as Lucy in the BBC Three miniseries My Left Nut.

In February 2021, Petticrew began starring as Izzy Brannick in the BBC One police procedural Bloodlands. Originally a limited series, it was renewed in March. That May, they played Orla Healy in the two-part drama Three Families, also on BBC One, followed by Jane Seymour in the three-parter Anne Boleyn on Channel 5 in June. They also appeared in the 2021 film Wolf. Petticrew starred opposite Julia Louis-Dreyfus in the 2023 fantasy film Tuesday.

Petticrew portrayed Dolours Price in the 2024 FX on Hulu series Say Nothing. The series won a Peabody Award. In late 2025, they played Cushla Lavery, the lead role in the Channel 4 adaptation of Louise Kennedy's novel, Trespasses.

In December 2025, it was revealed that Petticrew was cast as an undisclosed regular role in the upcoming live-action television adaptation of the Assassin's Creed video game series.

Petticrew plays Catherine Grace, a calculating and complex serial killer, in the Hulu crime drama series Furious, which premiered in July 2026, co-starring Emmy Rossum and created by Elizabeth Meriwether.

== Personal life ==
Petticrew is queer, non-binary and uses they/them pronouns. They are an atheist.

== Filmography ==
=== Film ===
Year	Title	Role	Notes
2017	Sparrow	Cara	Short film
2019	A Bump Along the Way	Allegra	
2019	The Return of the Yuletide Kid	Toni	
2020	Dating Amber	Amber	
2020	Here Are the Young Men	Julie	
2020	Shadows	Alex	
2021	Wolf	Judith (Parrot)	
2022	She Said	Young Laura Madden	
2023	Tuesday	Tuesday	
2026	I See Buildings Fall Like Lightning	Shiv	Completed

=== Television ===
Year	Title	Role	Notes
2018	Next of Kin	Carla	Miniseries; 1 episode
2018	Come Home	Laura Farrell	Miniseries; 3 episodes
2020	My Left Nut	Lucy	3 episodes
2021	Three Families	Orla Healy	Miniseries; 2 episodes
2021	Anne Boleyn	Jane Seymour	Miniseries; 2 episodes
2021–2022	Bloodlands	Izzy Brannick	Main role, 2 series; 10 episodes
2024	Say Nothing	Dolours Price	Main role, miniseries; 9 episodes
2025	Trespasses	Cushla Lavery	Main role; 4 episodes
2026	Furious	Catherine	Main role
TBA	Assassin's Creed	TBA	Main role

== Stage ==
Year	Title	Role	Notes
2017	The Last Ambulance	Jessica	Gate Theatre, Dublin
2018	Porcelain	Hat	Abbey Theatre, Dublin
2019	The Country Girls	Baba	Abbey Theatre, Dublin

== Awards and nominations ==
Year	Award	Category	Work	Result	Ref.
2019	Galway Film Fleadh	New Talent Award	A Bump Along the Way	Won	
2021	IFTA Awards	Lead Actress in a Film	Dating Amber	Nominated	
2021	Apolo Awards	Best Ensemble Cast	Dating Amber	Nominated	(Note: Shared with Dating Amber cast.)
2022	IFTA Awards	Supporting Actress in a Drama	Three Families	Nominated	
2025	IFTA Awards	Lead Actress – TV Drama	Say Nothing	Won	
2025	British Academy Television Awards	Best Actress	Say Nothing	Nominated	
2026	IFTA Awards	Lead Actress – TV Drama	Trespasses	Won	
