= The Rabbit Hutch =

2022 novel by Tess Gunty

- Author: Tess Gunty
- Language: English
- Genre: Literary fiction, psychological fiction, realistic fiction, coming of age
- Publisher: Knopf
- Publication date: August 2, 2022
- Publication place: United States
- Media type: Print, ebook, audiobook
- Pages: 338 pp (hardcover 1st ed.)
- Awards: Barnes & Noble Discover Award (2022); National Book Award for Fiction (2022); Waterstones Debut Fiction Prize (2022)
- ISBN: 9780593534663 (hardcover 1st ed.)
- OCLC: 1285052753
- Dewey Decimal: 813/.6
- LC Class: PS3607.U54827 R33 2022

The Rabbit Hutch is a 2022 debut novel by American novelist Tess Gunty and winner of the 2022 National Book Award for Fiction. Gunty also won the inaugural Waterstones Debut Fiction Prize and the Barnes & Noble Discover Award for the novel.

== Writing and development ==
The novel includes the perspectives of multiple characters. Gunty credits The Quick and the Dead by Joy Williams as the "novel that began" The Rabbit Hutch, as it was the first in a series of unrelated "polyphonic" novels that Gunty read.

== Plot background ==
This formally experimental and asymmetric novel is told largely from a third-person omniscient point-of-view, with protagonist Blandine as the focal character. The setting is the fictional post-industrial city of Vacca Vale, Indiana. The novel’s main protagonist is 18-year-old Blandine (formerly Tiffany Watkins), a highly gifted young woman who has recently dropped out of high school and graduated from the state’s foster care system. Most of the characters live in the low-income La Lapiniere Affordable Housing Complex.

=== Major characters ===
“On a hot night in Apartment C4, Blandine Watkins exits her body. She is only eighteen years old, but she has spent most of her life wishing for this to happen…The mystics call this experience the Transverberation of the Heart, or the Seraph’s Assault, but no angel appears to Blandine. There is, however, a bioluminescent man in his fifties, glowing like a firefly. He runs at her and yells.”—Opening paragraph to The Rabbit Hutch.

- Blandine, born Tiffany Watkins, is a former student at St. Philomena’s, Vacca Vale’s only private high school, where “the teachers liked her because she was brainy and tragic.”
- Hope: She is a new mother who develops a phobia for her baby’s eyes. She is married to Anthony, a construction worker.
- Elsie Blitz: She appears in the novel posthumously in blog posts and in an “auto-obituary.” Her career as a child TV star endeared her to many people, in the United States and internationally, as the ebullient Suzie Evans of Meet the Neighbors, a mid-20th century sitcom. Elsie is fondly “frozen forever at the age of eleven” in the hearts of her aging fans. Elsie’s rosy public image is sharply disputed by her only child, Moses Robert Blitz.
- Moses Robert Blitz: The disaffected son of a former child television star Elsie Blitz, who lives an almost exclusively digital life and terrorizes his “enemies” with nocturnal visits in the nude, covered in glow stick paint.
- Malik, Jack and Todd, the three young men who are Blandine’s roommates. They induce Blandine to “exit her body” in the narrative’s climax.
- Joan Kowalski. Joan, who “has the posture of a question mark” and a “voice like a communion wafer—tasteless, light,” screens user comments for Restinpeace.com, an online obituary site. Withdrawn and isolated, she does not approve of her neighbor Blandines’ lifestyle.

== Plot synopsis ==
The novel has no table of contents. It is organized into five parts (Parts I-V), comprising a total of 42 individually titled sections. The page numbers for each section are provided below.

PART I

- The Opposite of Nothing p. 3-4

Blandine reports an out-of-body experience—“exits her body” —the nature of which is not clear. She resides in apartment C4 at The Rabbit Hutch with three boys just out of their teens: Malik, Jack and Todd. Like Blandine, they have recently been released from the foster home system.

- All Together, Now pp. 5–17

Hope, a newlywed mother with a four-month-old son, is struggling with postpartum depression. Socially isolated and alienated from her construction worker husband, Anthony, she develops a phobia of her baby’s eyes. Hope is in the habit of killing mice in snap-traps and dropping the carcasses on the balcony of the apartment below, occupied by an elderly couple, Ida and Reggie. Ida is outraged and insists on retribution.

PART II

- Afterlife pp. 21–29

While at the local laundromat, Blandine meets her downstairs neighbor, Joan Kowalski, and introduces herself. Joan is wary and taciturn. Blandine, who has an enthusiasm for researching female mystics, launches into a discourse on religion, first quoting from 12th century Benedictine abbess Hildegard von Bingen. Joan is offended by Blandines cheerful blasphemies (Blandine considers “divine ecstasies” to be “an elevated form of masturbation”). Joan flees outside to make a phone call. Blandine is troubled at her own inability to modulate her interpersonal encounters, fearing she may have a “social impairment.” Blandine departs the laundry for the Vacca Vale Country Club, carrying two cotton bags filled—not with laundry— but a collection of figurine fetishes, fake blood vials, bags of dirt and small animal skeletons.

- A Threat to Us All: Vaca Vale Gazette pp. 30–33

Vaca Vale is revealed as a social catastrophe for its working-class residents in the aftermath of the closure of the local Zorn Automobile factory. The city has declared bankruptcy and faces unincorporation. Unemployment has reached 11.7%; murders, assaults, burglaries, rapes and arson are at alltime highs. The article reports that the town is ranked among the “top ten dying American cities.” The rat population, at 30,000, exceeds that of humans. New York City developers, with support of the mayor, have procured contracts to “revitalize” Vaca Vale by constructing tech startups in an area of local natural beauty, Chastity Valley. The plan promises to “attract talent from around the world.” A posh dinner, celebrating the launch of the project, is underway at the Vaca Vale Country Club, when debris falls from the ceiling vents, scattering the attendees. The tables are littered with handmade voodoo dolls, dirt and animal bones. The event is canceled, but the Gazette article reports that the revitalization plan will continue as scheduled.

- Where Life Lives On pp. 34–39

The narrator explains the origins of La Lapiniere Affordable Housing Complex, dubbed “The Rabbit Hutch” by its low-income residents. A Christian philanthropist had donated the funds for the project. The 40-year-old Joan Kowalski’s job entails posting and screening user comments for Restinpeace.com, an online obituary site. When an offensive comment concerning the recently deceased former child TV star Elsie Blitz is submitted by the decedent’s own son, Joan feels compelled to approve it. When the posting comes to the attention of management, she is roundly reprimanded. Joan’s supervisor reminds her “Defecation emojis are unacceptable…Really, Joan. Wake up." Joan, reading the Gazette article on the recent disruption at the country club, suspects that the odd girl she met at the laundromat—“pale, white-hairled, elven, thin. Pretty in a strange way”—might be the culprit.

- An Absolutely True Story pp. 40–48

The deceased TV star Elsie Blitz has written and posted her own obituary shortly before her death. Her “auto-obituary” includes a section on Life Lessons, as well as a letter to her only son, Moses Robert Blitz, and closes with an essay describing her first encounter with the Angel of Death at age 85.

- Hear Me Out pp. 49–55

The chapter is told as a first-person confessional narrative by Jack, describing how the three boys, including Jack, fell in love with Blandine. Most of the boys have not maintained good relations with their foster families.

- R.I.P. Tho: Guest Book pp. 56–60

This chapter offers postings on the Elsie Blitz obituary page that originate all over the United States and Internationally, including India, Hong Kong and Sweden. The comment from her son, Moses, is among the posts, including the declaration that “ELSIE WAS A #SHITTYMOTHER.”

- Intonation pp. 61–64

Moses attends a cocktail party at an upscale loft in Los Angeles after his mother’s death. He identifies himself as a mental health blogger, but can offer no academic credentials to justify his activity. When challenged, Moses defends himself: “I exclusively chronicle my own personal (italics) mental health…Each man is an expert on himself.” A female guest responds: “Your speech is codified in patriarchal microaggressions.” Moses flees the gathering.

- Big pp. 65–70

The chapter describes Blandine’s place of employment, the Ampersand diner, where she waitresses. The restaurant was established by “optimistic hippies” and offers “avant-garde pies” with names such as “avocado rhubarb, black mold, strawberry tomato vinegar, banana charcoal, and broccoli peach.” Blandine admits she is not a good waitress.

- Please Just pp. 71–73

Joan is sensitive to human noise and is suffering from the commotions emitted from apartment C4 where Blandine and her roommates carouse. On a train trip to Gary, Indiana, she is plagued by people who interrupt her peace. When she attempts to escape to a quieter compartment, the female occupant tells her “Please shut up and leave me alone!”

- My First Was a Fish pp. 74–80

Jack provides a narrative of his years with foster parents, Cathy and Robert. He describes the relationship with them as unobtrusive and benign, but people he “never believed in.” He remains a troubled youth, The “brightest thing” during this period is an affair with Anna, a community college student. She, too, is “unreal” to Jack. Jack collects a small dying fish by a river in February. He returns to the Rabbit Hutch and offers it to Blandine; who is greatly amused by the gift. Jack’s success deepens his conflict with Malik over who deserves Blandine’s affections.

- Chemical Hazard pp. 81–85

Rather than attend his mother’s funeral, Moses travels to Vaca Vale and prepares to punish Joan for deleting his scurrilous obituary post. Moses has developed a technique of stripping naked, covering his body in glow stick fluid, and entering his enemies homes at night in the dark, terrorizing them.

- Variables pp. 86–124

The chapter details an affair between the 42-year-old James Yager and the 17-year-old Tiffany Watkins. James is a music teacher at Vaca Vale’s only private high school, Tiffany, one of his students. Both are physically attractive and talented—he “the Cool Teacher,” she “the disposable ingenue.” James is married to Meg who has a Youtube show on vegan cooking. James enlists Tiffany as their babysitter. Post-affair, Tiffany sees nothing immoral about the sexual arrangement with James in terms of age, marital status or social status. The only unethical element is that the relationship “was always going to mean infinitely more to me than it meant to you, and you fucking knew it from the start.” Tiffany changes her name to Blandine, a teenage female mystic martyred by the Romans. She adopts Hildegard of Bingden as her patron saint. Graduating from the foster care system, she drops out of high school and moves into the Rabbit Hutch with Malik, Jack and Todd.

PART III

- It Wasn’t Todd’s Idea pp. 127–131

Malik, Jack and Todd rarely see Blandine at the apartment after the fish incident. The boys agree cynically that Vaca Vale has no future. Malik bullies Todd into killing a baby mouse, who is momentarily traumatized by the incident.

- Namesake pp. 132–133

The historical details of the life of Blandine inspires Tiffany to legally change her name to the Christian saint.

- Pearl pp. 134–142

Just hours before Blandine “exits her body” she walks through Vaca Vale devastation that her post-industrial town has suffered after the Zorn Automobile operations had collapsed: a post-industrial nightmare confronts her.

- The Rotten Truth pp. 143–171

Moses arrives in Vaca Vale and tours the town, visiting a Catholic Church. Baptized in the faith as a boy, he recoils when a priest, Father Tim, inquires if he is there to confess. A peregrine falcon nesting in the church rafters with three young prompts him to recall his troubled childhood, the only son of a former child film star. Moses confesses after all, disgorging a disjointed narrative of his childhood and rage towards his mother. Afterward, Father Tim ministers to Moses to help him make sense of his suffering.

- A List of Hildegard Quotes, Written in a Notebook, Which Jack Reads on Wednesday Morning, Tracing the Word Nothing on His Skin With a Fingernail pp. 172–173

This chapter lists seventeen observations and maxims by Hildegard.

- Purebreds pp. 174–185

Jack and Blandine surreptitiously visit the loft of the leading real estate developer for the Vaca Vale Revitalization development, Maxwell Pinky, Jack is employed by Maxwell to walk his Somoyed dogs. Blandine examines the loft as part of her scheme to sabotage the project, dubbed “Phase Two.” Phase One was her attack on the investor’s dinner party. She attempts to enlist Jack in the cause, but he resists. They come close to having sex, but suspect security cameras.

- The Flood pp. 186–198

The Rabbit Hutch has been evacuated due to severe and damaging flooding in Vaca Vale. Hope and her husband Anthony have sought refuge in an out-of-town motel. Despite the unfolding disaster their love sustains them. There they conceive their first child after 13 months of trying.

- Olive Brine pp. 199–203

Fresh from his discussion with Father Tim, Moses checks into a motel posing as a French national. He prepares to enact his glow stick revenge on Joan Kowalski.

- Game of Clue pp. 204–215

The chapter takes the form of an epistle addressed to a ‘Dr. Malachi” and signed by a “Mr. Boddy,” a pseudonym for Moses Blitz. The missive is a request for advice on “The Toll,” a concept related to sin and redemption. The letter is a rambling narrative, including dialogue with numerous characters, detailing his sex life, his early upbringing, mental condition, and primarily a woman named Beth: “Beth is what I call my wife.”

- Mostly Rabbits p. 216

A confession by one of the boys who room with Blandine about practicing ritual sacrifice on rabbits when she was absent from the apartment.

- The Expanding Circle pp. 217–223

Moses, posing as Mr. Boddy at a Vaca Vale motel, prepares to launch an after hours glow stick attack in the nude. A former girlfriend Jamie, calls him, wanting to offer condolences for the loss of his mother. Moses engages in quasi-philosophical rant at regarding their college days and “thought experiments.” She is too timid to hang up. Ruth, her sister, takes the phone and threatens Moses with a restraining order. Moses talks to his laptop and departs.

- Respect the Deceased pp. 224–226

Joan returns to her online tasks at Restinpeace.com. She ruthlessly deletes any comments she deems contrary to company policy, as required by management. A list of the objectionable posts are provided.

- Just Bored pp. 227–233

Blandine reflects on her intriguing encounter with Jack. At the apartment she takes a break from her audio books on the writings of Hildegarde to join Todd. He is watching an episode of Tough Love, set in a Foxconn factory in China, an Orwellian worker’s dystopia. Blandine registers dismay at the program, and attempts to engage with Todd; he coldly rebuffs her. When a promo for the Charity Valley development project airs, Todd begins to weep.

- Welcome Home p. 234

Todd suffers from his repressed social alienation and attempts to conceal it. He repeatedly watches Vaca Vale development commercials in order to induce an emotional response in himself.

- Your Auntie Tammy pp. 235–243

Joan receives religious gifts, usually crucifixes, from her beloved Auntie Tammy, a recluse. The present is emotionally precious to Joan, but she never sends thank you cards and suffers toxic remorse. To assuage her guilt, she gathers the gifts in a plastic bag and bestows them on Penny, aka “Mama Bags”, a lady she suspects lives at the women's shelter. Penny’s frank and sympathetic interrogation reminds Joan of her exchange with Blandine in the laundromat. Joan departs momentarily buoyed.

- Human Being! pp. 245–255

Blandine takes a walk in her neighborhood. A storm is brewing. She seeks something “devine in the sun” while contemplating Hildegard von Bingen, but fails. She has unpleasant encounters with several assaultive or pathetic male residents. She consults her text on Hildegard for enlightenment, but is troubled. Blandine attempts to rescue a lost and injured baby goat. With the kid in her arms she is shocked and dismayed when James Yager suddenly appears and offers her a ride.

- Major American Fires pp. 256–262

Jack reports that he was drinking vodka with Malik and Todd. Malik is celebrating: he has a new job teaching robots to experience emotions. Jack reads reports of American wildfires in a Scottish accent. Malik declares a conspiracy theory on local benzene poisoning. Inebriated, the boys report that Blandine has arrived in the apartment. And a baby goat.

- I Leave It Up to You pp. 263–277

Blandine has named the goat Hildegard. She deposits the kid in her bedroom, while James waits in the car. The pair engage in a protracted debate over the nature of their former affair. Blandine describes their relationship in Marxist terms: he the dominant capitalist, she the exploited proletariat. James protests. Recriminations are cast on both sides. The encounter ends in Blandine fleeing in despair from the car.

- Sold! P. 278

Clare Delacruz, former personal assistant to actress Elsie Blitz, arranges for the sale of her cremated ashes: $2.3 million, sold to a wealthy fan. The proceeds will go to the preservation of the rare Pygmy Three-toed Sloth. The impoverished Delacruz, a long-time and loyal employee, is not included in the will.

PART IV

- Altogether Now pp. 281–292

The section opens with anonymous online sex exchanges at La Lapiniere apartments. Hope reports to her husband that she is afraid of her child Elijah’s eyes. He assures her: “Everybody says he’s got your eyes.” Ida, still seeking revenge for the mice discarded by Joan on her deck, arranges for Reggie to dump a dead mouse at Joan’s door with a nasty note: Matthew 7:12. Reggie, after 62 years of marriage to Ida, reminisce fondly on their lives. Blandine, lying in bed, memorizes a long passage from the autobiography of St. Teresa of Avila concerning “the Seraph’s Assault. Teresa basically describes it as sex with God's hottest angel.” Joan is lying in bed and hears repeated “blood curdling” screams from Blandine’s apartment. Joan thinks “she knows what she got herself into,” and goes to sleep.

- Electrical Malfunction p. 293

Blandine has been knifed in the stomach by Todd. Malik uploads the video of the incident as expecting superb viral content. Moses rushes to Blandine and attempts to stop the bleeding. Jack sits stunned on the floor. The goat pees on the carpet. The suspects are questioned at the police station.

- Viral p. 294-295

Malik’s video is viewed by an older graduate of the foster care system, now with three children. She wonders if Malik staged the images: a goat bound with ropes, a girl with blood on her stomach. She reports the video to the authorities.

- According to Todd pp. 296–310

A graphic chapter without text.

- The Facts pp. 311–315

The section comprises nearly 200 single line entries providing disconnected and fragmented “facts” in more or less chronicle order related to the assault on Blandine.

- Solve for Y in terms of X pp. 316–320

James Yager is quizzed by his ex-wife with their former baby-sitter when she recognizes Blandine on the television news. James claims she was just a student who dropped out of his class. He retreats to the kitchen and sobs silently.

- Tada p. 321

It is midnight in the police station. Jack, terrified, is being interrogated by investigators.

- What Hildegard Said p. 322

Hildegard reports witnessing the appearance of “the light-filled man,” and exhorts all to “Shout and tell!”

PART V

- What is Your Relation? pp. 325–321

Todd, Malik and Jack have pleaded guilty to a level-3 felony: aggravated battery that posed a substantial risk of death. The “revitalization” of Chastity Valley continues unabated by real estate developers. Joan, filled with a sense of guilt, arrives at the Vaca Vale Medical Center to visit Blandine. The cheerfully cynical receptionist screens Joan: “We try to keep out the predators.” Though Blandine has given explicit instructions not to admit visitors to her room, Joan is ushered in. Blandine, on meds, does not immediately recognize Joan. Blandine asks if the goat is O. K.—yes, it is. Joan’s remorse almost overwhelms her:

She wants to say: I don’t have an emergency contact, either. She wants to say: I’m glad they didn’t kill you. She wants to say: I'm sorry for every instance I took when I could have given.

“You’re awake,” Joan says instead, incongruously.

A peculiar flash of light shivers across the room.

“I am,” Blandine replies. “Are you?”

== Reception ==
The Rabbit Hutch was well received by critics with starred reviews from Booklist, Kirkus Reviews, Library Journal, and Publishers Weekly.

Library Journal called the novel a "woefully beautiful tale of a community striving for rebirth and redemption," while Kirkus referred to it as a "stunning and original debut that is as smart as it is entertaining." The Wall Street Journal's Sam Sacks said The Rabbit Hutch was the "most promising first novel I've read this year." The Irish Times called it "breathtaking, compassionate and spectacular."

Multiple reviewers commented on Gunty's writing skill. Publishers Weekly said Gunty "mak[es] powerful use of language along the way." Booklist expanded on the sentiment, writing, "The brilliantly imaginative novel begins on an absurdist note before settling down to an offbeat, slightly skewed realism. Gunty is a wonderful writer, a master of the artful phrase." The Boston Globe highlighted how "Gunty weaves [characters'] stories together with skill and subtlety. The details ... are slipped in via a very few well-chosen details." The Times said, "The writing is incandescent, the range of styles and voices remarkable ... The novel leaps with great confidence across a multitude of styles."

Booklist highlighted Gunty's character development, saying the "fully realized characters come alive on the page, capturing the reader and not letting go."

The New York Times Book Review noted that there are "many bold moves in Gunty's dense, prismatic and often mesmerizing debut, a novel of impressive scope and specificity that falters mostly when it works too hard to wedge its storytelling into some broader notion of Big Ideas." They added, "its excesses also feel generous: defiant in the face of death, metaphysical exits or whatever comes next." The Guardian shared the sentiment, indicating that the novel "is almost over-blessed with ideas. Gunty doesn't quite balance the pieces of her story – she has a winning impulse for digression, but ... never quite settles into her sidebars. The insistent nudges back to the main arc stop her novel from creating the sense of invisible clockwork that would make it perfectly satisfying."

Publishers Weekly ultimately named The Rabbit Hutch one of the top ten books of 2022, regardless of genre.

Kaveh Akbar named it as one of his inspirations when writing Martyr!.

== Awards ==
| Year | Award | | Result | Ref |
|---|---|---|---|---|
| 2022 | Barnes & Noble Discover Award | — | Won | |
| 2022 | National Book Award | Fiction | Won | |
| 2022 | National Book Critics Circle Award | John Leonard Prize | Shortlisted | |
| 2022 | Waterstones Debut Fiction Prize | — | Won | |
| 2023 | BookTube Prize | Fiction | Octofinalist | |
| 2023 | British Book Award | Début Fiction | Shortlisted | |
| 2023 | Mark Twain American Voice Award | — | Shortlisted | |
| 2023 | VCU Cabell First Novelist Award | — | Won | |

== Adaptation ==
The rights to produce a television show based on the novel were sold in November 2022.

== Sources ==
- Gunty, Tess. 2022. The Rabbit Hutch. Alfred A. Knopf, New York. ISBN 978-0-593-53466-3
