= Dinosaurs on Other Planets =

Short story collection by Danielle McLaughlin

Dinosaurs on Other Planets is a short story collection by Danielle McLaughlin, published by The Stinging Fly in 2015.

== Stories ==
- "The Art of Foot-Binding"
- "Those That I Fight I Do Not Hate"
- "All About Alice"
- "Along the Heron-Studded River"
- "Night of the Silver Fox"
- "Not Oleanders"
- "Silhouette"
- "A Different Country"
- "The Smell of Dead Flowers"
- "In the Act of Falling"
- "Dinosaurs on Other Planets"

== Awards ==
- Joint winner, Windham–Campbell Literature Prize, fiction category in 2019
- Winner, Sunday Times Short Story Award in 2019
- Irish Times Book Club choice
