= Roshi =

Roshi may refer to:

- Roshi (name)
- Rōshi, a Japanese honorific title
- Roshi in Dhivehi (Maldivian language), refers to the flatbread roti or chapati
- Kyozan Joshu Sasaki, also known as Joshu Sasaki Roshi, and referred to simply as "Roshi" by his followers, a Japanese Zen teacher
- Master Roshi, a Dragon Ball character
- Roshia (ロシア), a Japanese word for Russia
  - Alya Sometimes Hides Her Feelings in Russian, a Japanese light novel series also known as Roshidere
