= Jean Kwok =

American author

- Kwok at Dragon Con 2026 in Atlanta, GA
- Born: Hong Kong
- Education: Harvard University (BA); Columbia University (MFA)
- Occupation: Novelist
- Writing career
- Genre: Fiction
- Notable works: Girl in Translation; Mambo in Chinatown; Searching for Sylvie Lee
- Notable awards: American Library Association Alex Award; Chinese American Librarians Association Best Book Award
- Website: www.jeankwok.com

Jean Kwok is the award-winning, New York Times and international bestselling Chinese American author of the novels Girl in Translation, Mambo in Chinatown, and Searching for Sylvie Lee, which was chosen as The Today Show Read with Jenna Book Club Pick.

== Biography ==
When Kwok was five years old, her family emigrated to Brooklyn, New York from Hong Kong. The apartment that she, her parents and siblings lived in was infested with roaches and rats and they did not have any central heating. She worked in a Chinatown clothing factory for much of her childhood.

After elementary school, Kwok was accepted to Hunter College High School, a public secondary school for intellectually gifted students. Upon graduation from high school, she was granted early admission to Harvard University. Originally interested in science, in part to escape a life toiling in a factory, she realized when she was at Harvard that she could follow her dream instead. This realization prompted her to change her concentration to English and American Literature. She received her BA in English with honors, all while working up to four jobs at a time. Kwok later received her MFA in Fiction from Columbia University.

After that, she moved to the Netherlands and worked for Leiden University and the Delft University of Technology, teaching English and working as a Dutch-English translator. Kwok now writes full-time and divides her time between the Netherlands and New York City.

== Career ==
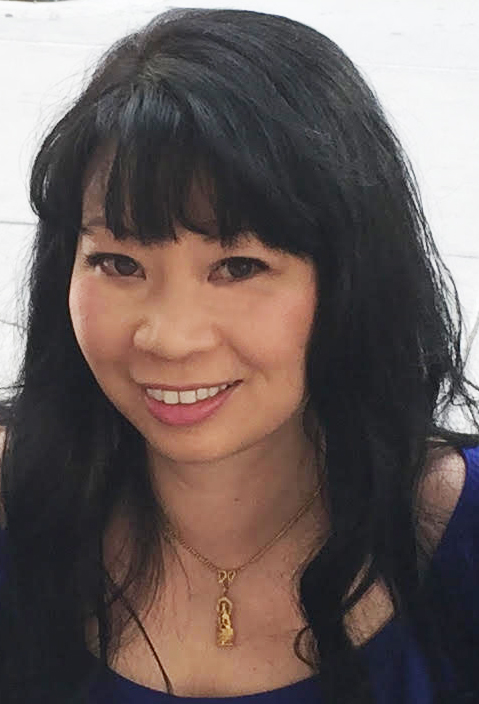
Jean Kwok

Kwok is a New York Times and international bestselling author. Her work has been published in 20 countries and taught in universities, colleges and high schools across the world. She has been selected for numerous honors including the American Library Association Alex Award, the Chinese American Librarians Association Best Book Award and the Sunday Times EFG Private Bank Short Story Award international shortlist. Jean's writing has been reviewed in Time, The New York Times, USA Today, Newsweek and Vogue, among others. She has appeared on The Today Show and Good Morning America, and spoken at many schools and venues including Harvard University, Columbia University and the Tucson Festival of Books. She was one of twelve contemporary authors asked to write an authorized, original Miss Marple story by the Agatha Christie estate.

Kwok is trilingual, speaking Dutch, Chinese, and English fluently, as evidenced by the VPRO documentary filmed about her. She also studied Latin for 7 years. She is a member of the Curatorial Board of Ragdale Foundation.

=== Novels ===
==== Girl in Translation ====
Kwok's debut novel Girl in Translation was published by Riverhead Books, an imprint of Penguin, in May 2010 and became a New York Times and international bestseller. It has been published in 18 countries and translated into 16 languages. Kwok drew upon her personal experience to write this novel about an exceptionally bright young girl who leads a double life in an exclusive private school and a Chinatown sweatshop.

Author Min Jin Lee compared the novel to A Tree Grows in Brooklyn. Nicole Tsong in the Seattle Times commented on Kwok's innovative use of language that allows readers to experience the linguistic barriers for themselves: "Kwok uses the potent combination of... halting English and a sophisticated internal narration about her new life to tell [the heroine's] story." Hannah Lee in the Philadelphia Jewish Voice noted that Girl in Translation was "as accurate to my childhood and upbringing in the world of New York's garment factories as a novel can be." Girl in Translation was featured in The New York Times, USA Today, Entertainment Weekly, Vogue and O, The Oprah Magazine, among others.

==== Mambo in Chinatown ====
Kwok's immigrant background plus her experience working as a professional ballroom dancer in between her degrees at Harvard and Columbia helped her to write her second novel about a young woman torn between her family duties in working class Chinatown and her escape into the world of ballroom dancing.

Kwok's second novel Mambo in Chinatown was also published by Riverhead Books in the United States on June 24, 2014. It was one of the New and Noteworthy Books listed by USA Today in June 2014 and was selected for Penguin Stacks and Best Books of 2014 by Real Simple and Woman's Day. The Chicago Tribune wrote, "rarely has [this story] been told with such grace, lightness and humor as in this delightful novel" while the Boston Herald called it "a great story of cultural conflict and reaching for your dreams."

==== Searching for Sylvie Lee ====
Kwok's third novel Searching for Sylvie Lee was published on June 4, 2019 by William Morrow and Company, a division of HarperCollins. This novel about a young Chinese American woman searching for her older sister who had disappeared while on a trip to the Netherlands was an instant New York Times bestseller in both hardcover and combined print and ebook fiction, as well as hitting the USA Today, Apple, Amazon, Publishers Weekly and American Booksellers Association bestseller lists. Searching for Sylvie Lee was chosen by Jenna Bush Hager as The Today Show Book Club Pick, Emma Roberts as the Belletrist Book Club Pick and O, The Oprah Magazine for their summer reading list, leading Entertainment Weekly to call the novel "this summer's book club sensation."

The New York Times Book Review wrote, "Kwok's story spans generations, continents and language barriers, combining old-fashioned Nancy Drew sleuthing with the warmth and heart we've come to expect from this gifted writer" and Kwok was profiled in The New York Times as one of "4 Writers to Watch." Commenting on Kwok's use of language in which each of the three narrator's inner dialogues are in their native tongues of Dutch, Chinese and English, the Columbia Journal wrote, "Depicting a language that hints at meaning through euphemisms and idioms, Kwok rejects glosses, italics, and explanatory commas…. Kwok's foray into the native speaker's mind maintains an admirable artistic integrity. More than a fast-paced thriller, Searching for Sylvie Lee is a meditation on dislocation, the gulf that separates generations of migrants, and the price of achieving some version of the American dream." The Washington Post called it, "A moving tale that, while billed as a mystery, transcends the genre… a beautifully written story in which the author evokes the hard reality of being an immigrant and a woman in today's world." PEN America wrote, "Jean Kwok’s latest novel examines cultural and linguistic barriers, family secrets, change, and the expansive identities of immigrants."

Searching for Sylvie Lee was one of the most-listed books of the summer, hitting many best book and most anticipated lists. It was featured and recommended by The New York Times, The Washington Post, Time, Newsweek, CNN, The New York Post, PEN America, Forbes, O, The Oprah Magazine, People, Marie Claire, Entertainment Weekly, Real Simple, InStyle, Elle, Harper's Bazaar and more.

== Honors and awards ==
- Jenna Bush Hager's Today Show Book Club Pick, 2019
- Emma Roberts' Belletrist Book Club Pick, 2019
- Best Book of Summer 2019 according to Newsweek, Marie Claire, New York Post, O, The Oprah Magazine, Real Simple, People, Elle, Harper's Bazaar, Good Housekeeping, Nylon, The Week, The Daily Beast, Publishers Weekly, BookBub, Conde Nast Traveler and more
- Goodreads Choice Awards Semi-Finalist for Mystery & Thriller, 2019
- Hannah Judy Gretz Fellow, Ragdale Foundation, 2015
- Real Simple's Best Books of 2014
- Woman's Day's Best Books of 2014
- American Library Association Outstanding Book for the College Bound, 2014
- Sunday Times Short Story Award shortlist, 2012
- Hunter College High School Distinguished Graduate Award, 2012
- John Gardner Fiction Book Award finalist, 2011
- Orange New Writers Book, 2011
- American Library Association Alex Award, 2011
- Chinese American Librarians Association Best Book Award, 2010
- National Blue Ribbon Book, 2010
- Barnes & Noble Discover Great New Writers Pick, 2010
- Indie Next Pick, 2010
- Goodreads Choice Awards Nominee for Fiction, 2010
- Goodreads Choice Awards Nominee for Debut Author, 2010
- Quality Paperback Book Club New Voices Award nominee, 2010
- Best Cultural Book, Book Bloggers Appreciation Week, 2010
- Bread Loaf Writers' Conference Scholarship
- Columbia University Graduate Writing Division Fellowships
- Harvard Club of New York City Scholar
- John Harvard Scholarship for Academic Achievement of the Highest Distinction
- Elizabeth Cary Agassiz Scholarship for Academic Achievement of the Highest Distinction

== Bibliography ==
=== Novels ===
- Girl in Translation (2010)
- Mambo in Chinatown (2014)
- Searching for Sylvie Lee (2019)
- The Leftover Woman (2023)

=== Short stories ===
- "The Jade Empress" (published in Marple: Twelve New Stories, HarperCollins, 2022)
- "Disguises" (published in Story, Holt Elements of Fiction, and The NuyorAsian Anthology)
- "And Fire Begets Earth" (published in Story)
- "Where the Gods Fly" (shortlisted for the international Sunday Times Short Story Award)

=== Poetry ===
- "Flawed Words and Stubborn Sounds" (2000)
- "A Translation of Schrijvende Vrouw" (2000)

=== Essays ===
- "Our Mothers, Ourselves". nydailynews.com. May 9, 2010. Archived from the original on May 11, 2010.
- "My Brother's Death has Broken Us" (2011)

=== Anthologies/Textbooks ===
- Elements of Literature (2007)
- The NuyorAsian Anthology (1999)

== See also ==
- List of Asian American writers
