= Stations (novel) =

2026 novel by Louise Kennedy

- Cover of the 2026 Bloomsbury edition
- Author: Louise Kennedy
- Language: English
- Genre: novel
- Publisher: Bloomsbury Publishing (UK); Riverhead Books (US)
- Publication date: 2026
- Publication place: London
- Pages: 304
- ISBN: 9781526664327
- Preceded by: Trespasses

Stations is a 2026 second novel by Louise Kennedy.

It was published by Bloomsbury on 24 October 2026.

The central character, Róisín, had previously appeared in the story "Belladonna", in Kennedy's collection The End of the World is a Cul de Sac.

== Plot ==
Stations tells the story of Róisín and Red, who meet as teenagers in Ireland in 1982. Red moves to London after a brush with the law, and Róisín goes there later. The book follows their lives over 25 years. The Guardian's reviewer summarised it as a "tale of broken hearts and broken people [which] moves from the Troubles of 1980s Northern Ireland to an unforgiving London of squats and payphones".

== Reception ==
The Guardian's reviewer called Stations "a blisteringly good second novel" and "at its heart a love story, a furious, tender, potty-mouthed paean to loyalty and generosity of spirit."

== Adaptations ==
Stations has been recorded in 15 episodes for BBC Radio 4, read by Amy Molloy and first broadcast beginning on 28 September 2026.
