= Paige Lewis =

Paige Lewis may refer to:

- Paige Lewis (singer-songwriter)
- Paige Lewis (writer)
