= Gordon Bowker Volcano Prize =

Award for travel-focused novel

The Gordon Bowker Volcano Prize is a British and Irish literary award for a novel focusing on travel, awarded annually by the Society of Authors. It was inaugurated in 2022, and is named for Malcolm Lowry's book Under the Volcano and endowed in memory of Gordon Bowker (1934-2019), Lowry's biographer, by Ramdei Bowker.

The three judges in the inaugural year of the prize were Caroline Brothers, Philip Hensher and Aamer Hussein. Brothers said of the shortlist:

... these novels stood out for their sophisticated understanding of people, places and history, for their courage in exploring complexity and the search for meaning, for the way they harnessed the power of language to help us see the world with fresh eyes.

The prize is awarded for "a novel focusing on the experience of travel away from home" written in English, published in Britain or Ireland, by a British or Irish author or resident. The winner receives £2,000, and a runner-up receives £750.

== Winners and shortlists ==
Year	Winner	Runner-up	Shortlisted	Source
2022	Sheila Llewellyn, Winter in Tabriz (Sceptre)	Jamie O'Connell, Diving for Pearls (Penguin)	Tessa McWatt, The Snow Line (Scribe UK); Catherine Menon, Fragile Monsters (Penguin); Olivia Sudjic, Asylum Road (Bloomsbury)	
2023	Aamina Ahmad, The Return of Faraz Ali (Sceptre, Hodder & Stoughton)	David Park, Spies in Canaan (Bloomsbury Publishing)	Julia Armfield, Our Wives Under the Sea (Picador, Pan Macmillan); Vesna Goldsworthy, Iron Curtain: A Love Story (Chatto & Windus, Vintage, Penguin Random House); Alex Hyde, Violets (Granta Books); Anjali Joseph, Keeping in Touch (Scribe UK)	
2024	Soula Emmanuel, Wild Geese (Footnote Press)	Cecile Pin, Wandering Souls (HarperCollins UK, 4th Estate)	Santanu Bhattacharya, One Small Voice (Fig Tree, Penguin Random House); Isabella Hammad, Enter Ghost (Jonathan Cape)	
2025	Hisham Matar, My Friends (Viking, Penguin Random House); Elif Shafak, There Are Rivers in the Sky (Viking, Penguin Random House)	Jo Hamya, The Hypocrite (Weidenfeld & Nicolson, Orion)	Matt Haig, The Life Impossible (Canongate Books); David Nicholls, You Are Here (Sceptre, Hodder & Stoughton); Ali Smith, Gliff (Hamish Hamilton, Penguin Random House)	
2026	Salma Ibrahim, Salutation Road (Mantle, Pan Macmillan)	* Jadelin Gangbo, Ground (Jacaranda Books)	Niamh Ní Mhaoileoin, Ordinary Saints (Manilla Press, Bonnier Books UK); Abdulrazak Gurnah, Theft (Bloomsbury Publishing); Kimberly Campanello, Use the Words You Have (Somesuch editions)	
