= Martyr! =

2024 novel by Kaveh Akbar

- Author: Kaveh Akbar
- Cover artist: Linda Huang
- Language: English
- Genre: Literary fiction
- Publisher: Alfred A. Knopf
- Publication date: January 23, 2024
- Publication place: United States
- Pages: 352
- ISBN: 978-0593537619

Martyr! is the 2024 debut novel by the Iranian-American poet Kaveh Akbar. A New York Times bestseller and one of the paper's Best Books of the Year So Far, it was a finalist for the 2024 Waterstones Debut Fiction Prize. The novel follows Cyrus, a queer Iranian-American dealing with depression and addiction who becomes obsessed with the idea of martyrdom.

== Plot ==
Cyrus is a queer poet living in Indiana, recovering from addiction to alcohol and drugs. His father, Ali, an Iranian migrant worker on a chicken farm in rural Indiana, is now deceased. Cyrus grows up believing that his mother, Roya, died aboard Iran Air Flight 655, a civilian passenger plane shot down by a U.S. Navy missile during the closing stages of the Iran–Iraq War.

Cyrus is interested in the idea of martyrdom, and begins working on a "book of martyrs", while contemplating his own death as a potential act of martyrdom. He learns of Orkideh, an Iranian performance artist with terminal breast cancer who is spending her last days in the Brooklyn Museum as part of a performance installation titled Death-Speak, reminiscent of endurance performances such as those by Marina Abramović. Cyrus travels to New York to talk with Orkideh, bringing his roommate Zee. Zee has strong feelings for Cyrus, although their relationship is often fraught.

The narrative moves across time periods and perspectives, including depicting the story of Cyrus' mother, who was in a secret lesbian relationship in Iran, and that of his uncle, who – while serving in the Iran–Iraq War – was instructed to dress as an angel on horseback in order to comfort dying soldiers on the battlefield.

Following Orkideh's death, Cyrus learns information that reshapes his understanding of his mother's fate. Years earlier, in an attempt to escape Iran with her lover Leila, Roya swapped passports with Leila before the flight. When Iran Air Flight 655 was shot down, the passenger traveling under Roya's identity was actually Leila. Roya survived, emigrated to the United States, and eventually reinvented herself as the artist Orkideh.

The revelation forces Cyrus to reevaluate his understanding of his family history and of the symbolic role his mother's supposed death had played in his life. In the novel's final scene, presented in a dreamlike register, Cyrus appears to reconcile with Zee before walking into a pool of golden light.

== Writing and development ==
Akbar found critical acclaim with his poetry collections Calling a Wolf a Wolf, released in 2017, and Pilgrim Bell, in 2021. During the COVID-19 pandemic, he decided to write a novel. Akbar wrote poems that served as a step in drafting the novel, and for a period he read two novels a week and watched a film daily as inspiration for his work.

In an interview with In These Times, Akbar explains that the response to the shooting down of Iran Air Flight 655 greatly influenced his decision to make it a focus of the novel.

== Reception ==
The New Yorker praised Martyr!: "Akbar's writing has the musculature of poetry that can't rely on narrative propulsion and so propels itself." The Boston Globe wrote that it is "stuffed with ideas, gorgeous images, and a surprising amount of humor".

Writing in The New York Times Book Review, Junot Díaz called it "incandescent" and its main character Cyrus Shams "an indelible protagonist, haunted, searching, utterly magnetic".

In a review published in The New York Review of Books, Francine Prose noted:

There's something immensely appealing about a meticulously written novel whose characters (Cyrus isn't the only one) are busily searching for meaning. It's a pleasure to read a book in which an obsession with the metaphysical, the spiritual, and the ethical is neither a joke nor an occasion for a sermon. And it's cheering to see a first-time (or anytime) novelist go for the heavy stuff—family, death, love, addiction, art, history, poetry, redemption, sex, friendship, US-Iranian relations, God—and manage to make it engrossing, imaginative, and funny.

Sarah Cypher of The Washington Post praised the reading experience as "a delight" and called the novel "wonderfully strange".

In September 2024 Martyr! was longlisted for the National Book Award for Fiction. In October 2024, the novel was shortlisted for the National Book Award for Fiction.

== Religious allegories ==
In an interview with In These Times, Akbar touched on his use of religious allegory throughout the novel. He said, "The word martyr suggests that someone willfully gave their life for a higher power, whether that higher power is terrestrial or cosmic. Cyrus is troubled by the limits of that taxonomy."
