= Baby Gold =

American retailer and producer

- Industry: Jeweller and retailer
- Founded: 2018; 8 years ago
- Founder: Helen Ashikian; Michael Ashikian
- Headquarters: Los Angeles
- Website: babygold.com

Baby Gold is an American retailer and producer of jewelry based in Los Angeles.

== Background ==
Baby Gold was launched in 2018 by Helen Ashikian and her husband Michael Ashikian.

== In the press ==
Baby Gold has been featured by major media outlets for style pieces and gift guides. They were featured in style roundups as seen in: The Zoe Report, Harper's Bazaar, Who What Wear, and others. Baby Gold has also been seen in many gift guides in outlets such as: Real Simple, Vogue, Glamour, PopSugar, and Esquire.
