= Danielle McLaughlin =

Irish writer

- Born: 1969 (age 56–57)
- Occupations: Short story writer; novelist
- Children: 3
- Writing career
- Notable awards: Windham–Campbell Literature Prize – Fiction 2019; Sunday Times Short Story Award 2019 A Partial List of the Saved

Danielle McLaughlin is an Irish author. Her collection of short stories, Dinosaurs on Other Planets (2015), won the Windham–Campbell Literature Prize for fiction and the Sunday Times Short Story Award. Her novel The Art of Falling (2021) was shortlisted for the International Dublin Literary Award.

== Works ==
Aoife O'Regan described The Art of Falling for RTÉ as a "family drama set in Cork, where absolutely everyone is flawed". Martina Devlin described it in the Irish Independent as "a novel about how people hurt one another emotionally, yet somehow find a way to move beyond those wounds."

== Personal life ==
McLaughlin lives in County Cork with her husband John, and their three children Ellie, Áine and Rory.

== Publications ==
- Dinosaurs on Other Planets (2015)
- The Art of Falling. London: John Murray, 2021. ISBN 978-1473613669.
- Rituals. Dublin: The Stinging Fly Press, 2026. ISBN 978-1916914049.

== Awards ==
- Winner, Willesden Herald International Short Story Prize in 2013 for Holidaying with the Megarrys.
- Joint winner, Windham–Campbell Literature Prize, fiction category in 2019. A $165,000 prize.
- Winner, Sunday Times Short Story Award in 2019 for A Partial List of the Saved. A £30,000 prize.
- Shortlisted, International Dublin Literary Award in 2022 for The Art of Falling.
