= Caroline Brothers =

Australian-born novelist and journalist

Caroline Ann Brothers
- Born: Hobart, Australia
- Education: University of Melbourne; University College London (Ph.D.)
- Occupations: Author, journalist

Caroline Ann Brothers is an Australian-born novelist, nonfiction writer, and former foreign correspondent.

== Early life and education ==
Brothers was born in Hobart, Australia, and grew up in Melbourne. She studied history at the University of Melbourne and later earned a Ph.D. at University College London, where she wrote her thesis on press photography in the Spanish Civil War. In 1997, she published a book based on her doctoral studies, War and photography : a cultural history.

== Career ==
After Brothers completed her doctorate she joined Reuters news agency where she was trained as a foreign correspondent and went on to report from locations across Latin America and Europe including Amsterdam, Belfast, Brussels, London, Mexico City and Paris. Her work as a journalist has been published in the International Herald Tribune, The New York Times, Granta, The Sunday Times Magazine, The Guardian, the British Journal of Photography and Meanjin and elsewhere.

Working as a journalist in France, Brothers met Afghan refugees and her account of their life in temporary camps was published by The New York Times. Wanting to write more about this subject, she went on to write her first novel inspired by some of the stories she heard while interviewing Afghan refugees around Europe. Hinterland was published in 2012 and tells the story of two young Afghan brothers as they cross Europe trying to reach England. The Irish Times's book review said that "There is poetry on every page, as well as pity, and the poetry is not always in the pity but in the joy of being alive on this earth". Hinterland has, since its publication, been adapted as the theatrical installation Flight, produced by the Glasgow-based theatre company Vox Motus at the Edinburgh International Festival and on locations in Ireland, the UAE and New York.

In 2016 Brothers published her second novel, The Memory Stones, which tells the story of a family in Buenos Aires in 1976 during Argentina's Dirty War. Again inspired by real events at the time, she tells the story of a family's search for their daughter and unknown grandchild, representing the real life cases of some 500 illegally adopted babies born to some of the tens of thousands of people who became known as the "disappeared" during Argentina's last military dictatorship. Jennifer Showell-Hartogs, reviewing it for the Washington Independent Review of Books, wrote of the author's "beautiful yet heartbreaking prose.... Even Brothers’ imagery is dark and haunting... Yet within that darkness there is the beauty that can only be found in love and hope".

Brothers has been a Royal Literary Fund Fellow at the University of Westminster and at the V&A Museum and the Science Museum Group, and in 2022, she was one of the judges for the Society of Authors' inaugural Gordon Bowker Volcano Prize.

== Selected publications ==
- Brothers, Caroline (1997). War and photography : a cultural history. London: Routledge. ISBN 9780415130998.
- Brothers, Caroline (2012). Hinterland. London: Bloomsbury. ISBN 9781408821619.
- Brothers, Caroline (2016). The Memory Stones. London: Bloomsbury. ISBN 9781408844519.
