= Tess Gunty =

American novelist (born 1992)

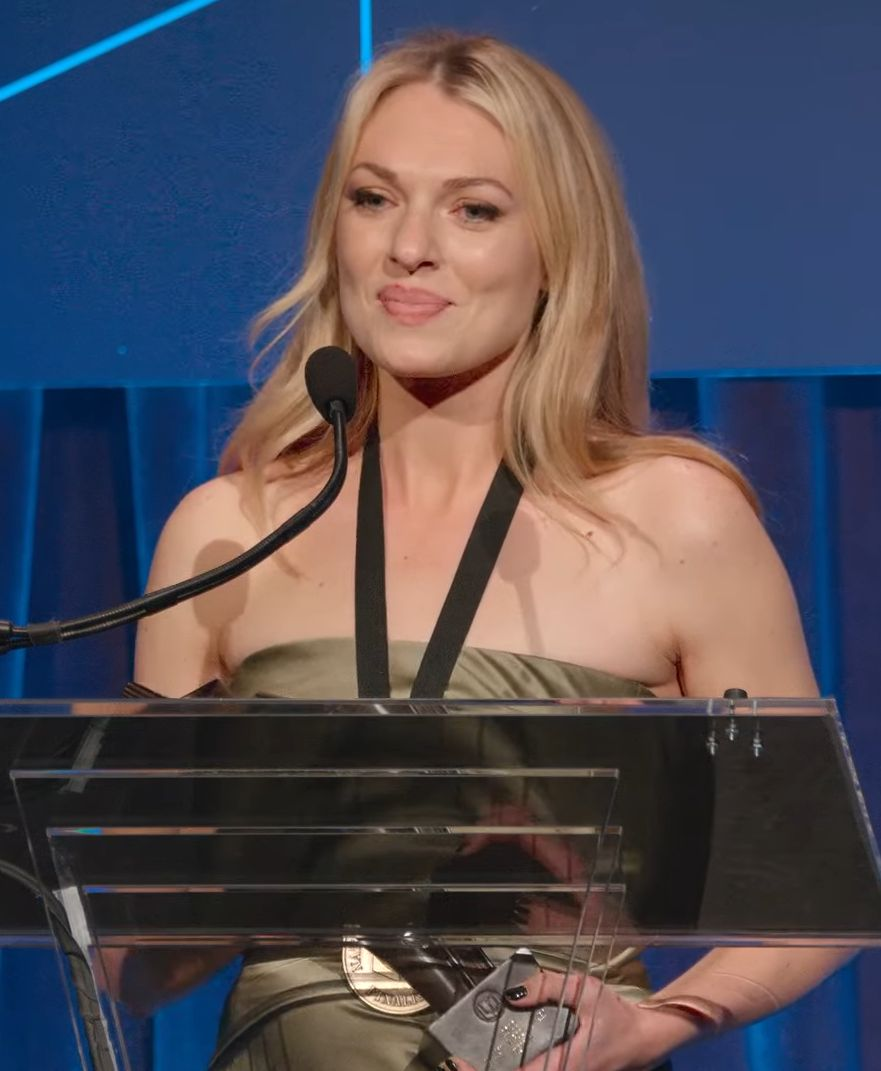
- Gunty in 2022
- Born: 1992 (age 33–34); South Bend, Indiana, U.S.
- Education: University of Notre Dame (BA); New York University (MFA)
- Occupation: Novelist
- Writing career
- Genre: Fiction
- Website: www.tessgunty.com

Tess Gunty (born 1992) is an American novelist. Her debut novel, The Rabbit Hutch, won the 2022 National Book Award for Fiction and the Indiana Authors Awards in 2024.

== Early life and education ==
Gunty was born and raised in South Bend, Indiana. She graduated from the University of Notre Dame with a Bachelor of Arts in English and from New York University with a Masters in Fine Arts degree in creative writing.

== Career ==
Gunty's first novel, The Rabbit Hutch, was published by Knopf on August 2, 2022, and was awarded the National Book Award for Fiction in November 2022. It received generally favorable reviews from critics. The novel also received the inaugural Waterstones Debut Fiction Prize. It was a finalist for the 2022 John Leonard Prize, awarded by the National Book Critics Circle for a first book in any genre.

== Awards ==
Year	Work	Award		Result	Ref
2022	The Rabbit Hutch	Barnes & Noble Discover Award	—	Won	
2022	The Rabbit Hutch	National Book Award	Fiction	Won	
2022	The Rabbit Hutch	National Book Critics Circle Award	John Leonard Prize	Shortlisted	
2022	The Rabbit Hutch	Waterstones Debut Fiction Prize	—	Won	
2023	The Rabbit Hutch	BookTube Prize	Fiction	Octofinalist	
2023	The Rabbit Hutch	British Book Award	Début Fiction	Shortlisted	
2023	The Rabbit Hutch	Mark Twain American Voice in Literature Award	—	Shortlisted	
2024	The Rabbit Hutch	Indiana Authors Awards	Fiction	Won	

== Works ==
=== Books ===
- —— (2022). The Rabbit Hutch (hardcover 1st ed.). Knopf. ISBN 9780593534663.
- —— (2025). Honeydew (1st ed.). (forthcoming)
