= A Bump Along the Way =

- Poster
- Directed by: Shelly Love
- Written by: Tess McGowan
- Produced by: Louise Gallagher
- Starring: Bronagh Gallagher; Lola Petticrew; Mary Moulds; Dan Gordon; Zara Devlin
- Cinematography: Mark McCauley
- Edited by: Helen Sheridan
- Music by: Die Hexen
- Production companies: Bump Films; Gallagher Films
- Distributed by: Element Pictures
- Release dates: 11 April 2019 (Belfast Film Festival); 11 October 2019 (Ireland)
- Running time: 95 minutes
- Countries: United Kingdom; Ireland
- Language: English

A Bump Along the Way is a 2019 Irish-British comedy-drama film directed by Shelly Love.

== Synopsis ==
A heavy-drinking Derry single mother becomes pregnant at the age of 44 from a one-night stand, much to the mortification of her teenage daughter.

== Cast ==
- Bronagh Gallagher as Pamela
- Lola Petticrew as Allegra
- Mary Moulds as Sinead
- Dan Gordon as Michael
- Zara Devlin as Rhiannon Coyle
- Gerard Jordan as Kieran

== Production ==
A Bump Along the Way was developed through Northern Ireland Screen's New Talent Focus scheme and Lottery funding via the Arts Council of Northern Ireland.

== Release and reception ==
A Bump Along the Way premiered at the 2019 Belfast Film Festival, then went on general release in October 2019.

On the review aggregator website Rotten Tomatoes, 100% of 12 critics' reviews are positive, with an average rating of 7/10.

The Guardian gave it three stars out of five, saying "The movie has a few awkward narrative transitions and a few EastEnders-ish running-out-of-the-room-crying scene endings, but the overall mood is persuasive and heartfelt and Bronagh Gallagher is a great lead." Variety said that it was "sometimes genuinely perceptive and sometimes pat, with superb leads as its consistent anchor."

=== Awards ===
A Bump Along the Way was nominated for Best Film (2020) at the 16th Irish Film & Television Awards, while Bronagh Gallagher was nominated for Best Actress (Film).

Shelly Love, Tess McGowan and Louise Gallagher were nominated for the Discovery Award at the British Independent Film Awards 2019.
