= Olivia Sudjic =

British fiction writer (born 1988)

- Born: Olivia Katarina Sudjic; 1988/1989; London, England
- Education: Trinity Hall, Cambridge
- Father: Deyan Sudjic

Olivia Katarina Sudjic (born 1988/1989) is a British fiction writer whose first book, Sympathy, received positive reviews in the press, from publications such as The New York Times, The Guardian and The New Republic. In 2023, she was named on the Granta Best of Young British Novelists list, compiled every 10 years since 1983, identifying the 20 most significant British novelists aged under 40.

== Background ==
Sudjic was born in London, England. She was educated at the City of London School for Girls and then studied English Literature at Trinity Hall, Cambridge, where she won the E.G. Harwood Prize for English.

== Selected texts ==
=== Sympathy (2017) ===
Sympathy revolves around a twenty-something woman visiting New York who becomes obsessed with an older woman via the social media app Instagram. The book is recognized for addressing generational differences: "A child of the age of algorithms, she notices everything but knows the value and significance of nothing." As for the structure, it resembles the disjointed experience of surfing the internet, thereby reinforcing the story's focus on technology.

The reviews for Sympathy were enthusiastic. The New Republic refers to the novel as "a remarkable debut, and with the arrival of such a novelist we can finally welcome our techno-dystopian future with open arms." According to The New Republic, Sympathy is "The First Great Instagram Novel", dealing with obsession and smartphone technology. The article goes on to say: "Rarely do novels so ostentatiously of the moment succeed so well at gesturing to the universal." The novel was also mentioned in Vanity Fair, The Financial Times, The Spectator, The Telegraph, Elle, Esquire, Star Tribune, The Times, The New Yorker and Vice, among others.

Sudjic began writing Sympathy in 2014 while staying with her grandmother in Manhattan. New York City ended up becoming integral to the story, representing the protagonist's "...searching and longing for connection." In the beginning, Sudjic intended to write an historical novel, but changed her mind and set the story in contemporary times. Sympathy has been described as a feminist work, with Sudjic stating that the internet is male-dominated.

=== Exposure (2018) ===
Exposure, a non-fiction work, was published by Peninsula Press, and named a book of the year for 2018 by the Irish Times, Evening Standard and White Review.

=== Asylum Road (2021) ===
Sudjic's third novel Asylum Road was published in 2021 by Bloomsbury. The narrator Anya is from Sarajevo, and survived the siege of that city. The novel is about her disintegration. The title refers to the street in Peckham on which an asylum was located.

Asylum Road was shortlisted for the Royal Society of Literature's 2022 Encore Award and the Society of Authors' 2022 Gordon Bowker Volcano Prize.

== Bibliography ==
- Sympathy (2017)
- Exposure (2018)
- Asylum Road (2021)

== Awards and honours ==
In 2023, Sudjic was named on the Granta Best of Young British Novelists list, compiled every 10 years since 1983, identifying the 20 most significant British novelists aged under 40.

Awards for Sudjic's writing
Year	Title	Award	Result	Ref.
2018	Sympathy	The London Magazine and Collyer Bristow Prize for Debut Fiction	Shortlist	
2018	Sympathy	Premio Salerno Libro d'Europa (Salerno Letteratura festival)	Finalist	
2022	Asylum Road	Encore Award	Shortlist	
2022	Asylum Road	Gordon Bowker Volcano Prize	Shortlist	
