= Anna Metcalfe =

British writer

Anna Metcalfe is a British writer. She was born in Germany and studied literature at the University of York. She continued her postgraduate studies at the University of East Anglia, receiving a PhD in creative and critical writing. She now teaches creative writing at Birmingham University.

Metcalfe writes fiction. Her short stories have been widely anthologized. Her debut collection Blind Water Pass (2016) included the story "Number Three", shortlisted for the Sunday Times Short Story Award. Her debut novel Chrysalis was published in 2023.

In 2023, Metcalfe was named by Granta magazine as one of the best young writers in Britain.
