= Gurnaik Johal =

British writer (born 1998)

Gurnaik Singh Johal (born 1998) is a British writer of Indian origin. Originally from Northolt, London, he studied at the University of Manchester.

Johal's debut collection of short stories, We Move, was published in 2022. Among other honours, it won the Somerset Maugham Award. His sophomore novel, Saraswati, was published in 2025. Johal was named one of the 10 best new novelists of 2025 by The Observer.

== Books ==
=== We Move (2022) ===
We Move was published April 2022, by Serpent's Tail, and contains 17 stories:

1. Arrival
2. The Red River
3. Leave to Remain
4. Chatpata: Kaam
5. Strange Attractor
6. Flight Path
7. SYM
8. The Turn
9. Chatpata: Ahankar
10. Afterimage
11. The Piano
12. Haven Green
13. Be More Roy
14. Chatpata: Moh
15. Freehold
16. The Twelfth of Never
17. We Move

The collection was generally well received by critics, with both The Guardian and Hindustan Times named it one of the best books of 2022. It won the 2023 Somerset Maugham Award and the Tata Literature Live! First Book Award. Prior to the collection's publication, "Arrival" won the 2022 Galley Beggar Press Short Story Award, and "The Piano" had been shortlisted for the 2018 Guardian and Fourth Estate BAME Short Story Prize.

=== Saraswati (2025) ===
Saraswati was released in 2025.

The book was shortlisted for Waterstones debut fiction prize and for the Sunday Times Young Writer of the Year Award.

Siddhartha Deb of The New York Times praised the book as "a welcome shift from the family dramas and autofictions that have tended to dominate literary renderings of India," albeit saying that "the texture of life in this quasi-dystopic India feels thin, rendered theoretically rather than through deep engagement with lived experience." Keshava Guha of The Guardian wrote that "Johal is a brilliant observer of romance: of uncertain beginnings and awkward endings," but said that the novel's "unstable blend of realism and allegory ultimately breaks down in the face of its central theme: modern Hindu nationalism... Johal’s India is led by a man called “Narayan Indra” (Indra is the Hindu rain god), whose actions and rhetoric are so cartoonish as to drain away all menace and seriousness. His millenarian ravings are a world away from actually existing Hindutva, which might gesture at past golden ages but is always laser-focused on its present-day target: India's Muslims."
