= Jadelin Mabiala Gangbo =

Congolese writer

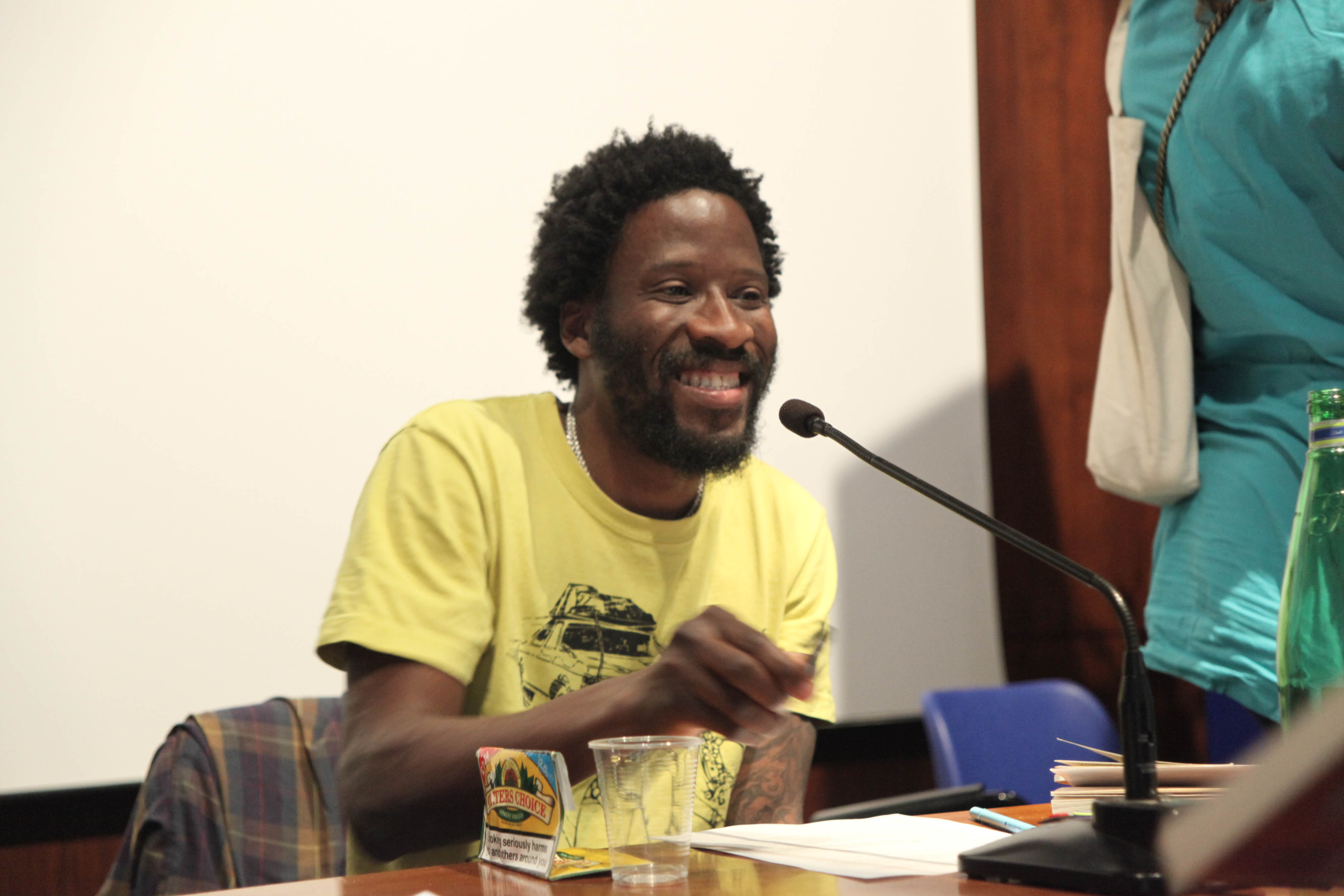
- Born: 1976 (age 49–50); Brazzaville, Republic of the Congo
- Occupation: Novelist
- Website: www.jadelingangbo.com

Jadelin Mabiala Gangbo (born 1976) is a writer who was born in Brazzaville, Republic of the Congo. He lived between Imola and Bologna from the age of four.

== Works ==
Jadelin Mabiala Gangbo has published several short stories and novels in Italian including Verso la Notte Bakonga (Toward the Bakonga Night), and Rometta and Giulieo. Verso la notte Bakonga is a portrait of Italian society and culture through the construction of a different identity and influences. In fact, Gangbo narrates a story of a young man from Bakongo, born in Brazzaville but raised in Italy.

His 2009 book, Due volte, is a novel about the adventures of twins in a religious institute, awaiting their father's release from prison. Meanwhile, the brothers grow up and are torn between two cultures: the Congolese of their origin and the Italian in which they live. While one of the two, David, is drawn to the Catholic philosophy and the promise of eternal life, Daniel loves Agatha, a girl who was raped by her uncle. Around them, moves a world of characters who reflect the ills and hopes in Italy in the 1980s: Pasquale, a young racketeer, Giò Giò the complainer, single mothers, Gypsies, sisters and teachers. Gangbo is the winner of a literary award for migrant writers, Eks&Tra.

His first most recent novel, and his first to have been written in English, is Ground, published by Jacaranda Books in 2024. A review of Ground in The Big Issue concluded: "Gangbo's novel is a moving, redemptive work that reconciles family relationships with tender attention. His characters offer hope for healing amid the wreckage." In 2026, the book was shortlisted for the Gordon Bowker Volcano Prize awarded by the Society of Authors for a novel focusing on travel.

== Publications ==
- Verso la Notte Bakonga, Toward the Bakonga Night, Portofranco, 1999
- Rometta e Giulieo, Feltrinelli Editore, 2001
- Una congrega di falliti, Instar, 2008
- Due volte, E/O, 2009
- Ground, Jacaranda Books, 2024, ISBN 9781914344688
