= Lucy Steeds =

English novelist (born 1990s)

- Education: Jesus College, Oxford; University College, Oxford
- Years active: 2024–present

Lucy Steeds (born 1995) is an English writer. Her debut historical fiction novel The Artist (2025) won the Waterstones Debut Fiction Prize and Waterstones Book of the Year among other accolades.

== Early life ==
Steeds grew up in London. She graduated with a Bachelor of Arts (BA) in English literature from Jesus College, Oxford and a Masters degree (MA) in World Literatures from University College, Oxford. She is also a graduate of the Faber Academy and the London Library's Emerging Writers programme.

== Career ==
In 2024, John Murray Press acquired the rights to publish Steeds' debut historical fiction novel The Artist in 2025. Set in 1920s Provence, the "psychodrama" follows three characters: English aspiring journalist Joseph Adelaide, the artist Édouard Tartuffe, and Tartuffe's niece Ettie. Steeds had been inspired her time living in France and her love of art history. The Artist won the Waterstones Debut Fiction Prize and was named one of the best historical fiction books of 2025 by The Sunday Times. It was also shortlisted for the Women's Prize for Fiction. It was chosen as the 2025 Waterstones Book of the Year. the judges describing it as "a novel which you don’t just read – you experience it with all your senses".

== Personal life ==
Steeds splits her time between Amsterdam and London. She has also lived in Paris and Singapore.

== Accolades ==
Year	Award	Category	Title	Result	Ref.
2025	Women's Prize for Fiction		The Artist	Longlisted	
2025	Waterstones Debut Fiction Prize		The Artist	Won	
2025	Waterstones Book of the Year		The Artist	Won	
2025	Barnes & Noble Discover Prize		The Artist	Shortlisted	
2025	Barnes & Noble Book of the Year		The Artist	Shortlisted	
2026	Walter Scott Prize		The Artist	Longlisted	
2026	British Book Awards	Debut Book of the Year	The Artist	Shortlisted	
2026	Festival du premier roman		The Artist	Shortlisted	
