= Jonathan Tel =

British fiction writer, poet and critic

Jonathan Tel is a British fiction writer, poet, and critic, best known for his fiction and winner of the V.S. Pritchett prize from the Royal Society of Literature.

Tel has lived in the United States and United Kingdom, and traveled widely in Asia and the Middle East. He studied at Stanford University, earning an M.S. in Theoretical Physics and a Ph.D in Philosophy and History of Science. He also did graduate studies in quantum physics and general relativity at the Department of Applied Mathematics and Theoretical Physics at the University of Cambridge.

Tel's published works include two books set in China: the novel-in-stories, Scratching the Head of Chairman Mao, and the story collection, The Beijing of Possibilities; also Freud's Alphabet, a novel set in Vienna and London, and Arafat's Elephant, a story collection that takes place in Jerusalem. His short stories have appeared in publications such as Granta, The Guardian, The Sunday Times (UK), and Prospect. His work has been published in translation in eight languages.

His writing has won several prizes, including the Sunday Times EFG Fiction Award, the Commonwealth Short Story Prize, and the V.S. Pritchett Prize from the Royal Society of Literature. He was awarded a Fellowship in Fiction from the National Endowment for the Arts, and was a finalist for the PEN/Hemingway Award. Tel has also received residencies at MacDowell, Yaddo, Ucross, and the Rockefeller Center at Bellagio.

== Works ==
=== Books ===
- Scratching the Head of Chairman Mao, Turtle Point Press (2020)
- The Beijing of Possibilities, Other Press (2009)
- Freud's Alphabet, Scribner (2003)
- Arafat's Elephant, Counterpoint (2002)
