= Niamh Ní Mhaoileoin =

Irish writer (born 1989)

- Born: 1989 (age 36–37); Dublin, Ireland
- Education: Trinity College Dublin; SOAS University of London
- Occupation: Writer
- Website: www.niamhnimhaoileoin.com

Niamh Ní Mhaoileoin (born 1989) is an Irish writer. She began her writing career as a journalist and editor. She is best known for her debut novel Ordinary Saints (2025).

== Early life ==
Ní Mhaoileoin was born in Dublin. Ní Mhaoileoin attended Castleknock Community College. She graduated a degree in English with Classical Civilisation from Trinity College Dublin and a degree in Politics from SOAS University of London. During university, she was a prolific debater.

== Career ==
After leaving SOAS, Ní Mhaoileoin went into freelance journalism, contributing to publications such as The New Statesman. From early 2016 to summer 2017, she served as Editor of Left Foot Forward. She also worked as a media officer for the Trades Union Congress (TUC) until 2020.

The manuscript for Ní Mhaoileoin's debut novel Ordinary Saints won the inaugural 2022 PFD Queer Fiction Prize and was shortlisted for the Women's Prize for Fiction's Discoveries prize. In 2024, Manilla Press (a Bonnier Books imprint) acquired the rights to publish the novel in 2025. The novel follows an Irish lesbian living in London who learns her late brother might become a saint. Ní Mhaoileoin became "obsessed with the arcane and bizarre process of canonisation" after reading about Carlo Acutis. Ordinary Saints was a BBC Radio 2 Book Club Pick and shortlisted for the Waterstones Debut Fiction Prize, two Books Are My Bag Readers' Awards, Kerry Group Irish Novel of the Year and the Gordon Bowker Volcano Prize. It was also longlisted for the Dublin Literary Award.

== Bibliography ==
=== Novels ===
- Ordinary Saints (2025)

=== Shorts ===
- in Fierce Salvage: A Queer Words Anthology (2025)

== Accolades ==
| Year | Award | Category | Title | Result | Ref. |
|---|---|---|---|---|---|
| 2022 | PFD Queer Fiction Prize | Adult | Ordinary Saints | Won | |
| 2022 | Women's Prize for Fiction | Discoveries | Ordinary Saints | Shortlisted | |
| 2025 | Waterstones Debut Fiction Prize | | Ordinary Saints | Shortlisted | |
| 2025 | Books Are My Bag Readers' Awards | Fiction | Ordinary Saints | Shortlisted | |
| 2025 | Books Are My Bag Readers' Awards | Newcomer of the Year | Ordinary Saints | Shortlisted | |
| 2026 | Kerry Group Irish Novel of the Year | | Ordinary Saints | Shortlisted | |
| 2026 | Dublin Literary Award | | Ordinary Saints | Longlisted | |
| 2026 | Gordon Bowker Volcano Prize | | Ordinary Saints | Shortlisted | |
