= Sheila Llewellyn =

Novelist from Northern Ireland (born 1948/49)

Sheila Llewellyn (born 1948) is a writer in Northern Ireland. Her first novel, Walking Wounded (2018), was based on events in Burma in the Second World War when a decision was made to kill some seriously injured soldiers who could not be evacuated, rather than leave them to possible torture by the approaching Japanese army. Her second novel, Winter in Tabriz (2021), set in Iran in 1979, won the inaugural Gordon Bowker Volcano Prize, for a novel focusing on travel, in 2022. Philip Hensher chose it as one of his "Books of the Year" in The Spectator, describing it as "a revelation – long considered and slowly overwhelming with its sense of time and place".

== Life ==
Sheila Llewellyn was born in 1948 in Manchester, England, of Welsh heritage. She has dual British/Irish citizenship, and lives and works in Northern Ireland. Llewellyn lived in Guyana with her father as a child, before moving back to Manchester for her education. She attended the Goyt Bank High School for Girls (now Offerton School), in Stockport, before studying psychology, education and creative writing Manchester University, Oxford University and Queens University Belfast. In 2016 she also earned a PhD in creative writing from the Seamus Heaney Centre.

Llewellyn's first novel, Walking Wounded (2018), was based on events in Burma in the Second World War when a decision was made to kill some seriously injured soldiers who could not be evacuated, rather than leave them to possible torture by the approaching Japanese army. The Guardian's reviewer called it a "quietly self-assured first novel" and "a beautifully turned piece of work", which bore comparison to Pat Barker's Regeneration trilogy.

Her second novel, Winter in Tabriz (2021), set in Iran in 1979, won the inaugural Gordon Bowker Volcano Prize, for a novel focusing on travel, in 2022. Philip Hensher chose it as one of his "Books of the Year" in The Spectator, describing it as "a revelation – long considered and slowly overwhelming with its sense of time and place".

== Selected publications ==
- Walking Wounded (2108, Sceptre: ISBN 978-1473663107)
- Winter in Tabriz (2021, Sceptre: ISBN 978-1473663145)
