= Paige Lewis (writer) =

American writer (born 1991)

- Lewis in 2020
- Born: 1991 (age 34–35)
- Education: Florida State University (MFA, PhD)
- Occupation: Poet
- Spouse: Kaveh Akbar
- Website: paigelewispoetry.com

Paige Lewis is an American poet and the author of the collection Space Struck, which was named one of the Best Books of 2019 by Entropy and Book Riot. Lewis's debut novel, Canon, was published by Viking Press / Penguin in May 2026.

They are an assistant professor in the undergraduate creative writing program at the University of Iowa. Before that, they taught at Purdue University. They also teach in the low-residency fine art program at Randolph College.

They curated a YouTube poetry series called Ours Poetica for Complexly. They served as assistant editor at Divedapper and as assistant poetry editor of The Southeast Review. They co-edited, with Kaveh Akbar, the Sarabande Books anthology Another Last Call: Poems on Addiction and Deliverance.

== Early life and education ==
Lewis received their MFA and PhD from Florida State University.

== Works ==
Lewis won The Florida Review Editor's Award in Poetry in 2016 and was named The Adroit Journal 's Gregory Djanikian Scholar in 2018.

In 2019, their debut collection Space Struck was published by Sarabande Books.

The Millions called it "One of the best debuts of the year," writing: "Poem by poem, Lewis builds a menagerie of mood and matter." The Rumpus wrote that "It pulses with light and shimmers with hope." The Carolina Quarterly wrote: "In a Lewis poem, paying attention reveals craziness and danger. . . Lewis' poems show us what is so hard to look at, the truth we squirm to see. And they make us culpable in the process."

In an interview, The Adroit Journal noted that "Space Struck swerves toward the tercet in numerous instances" and described the poems as "sometimes directly interrogate the metaphysical, the spiritual realm." Stay Thirsty Magazine wrote: "Lewis takes up this idea of purgatory, and other religious ideals, in much of their work. The speaker of their poetry searches the space between religious reveries and the corporeal truths of reality."

Lewis's poetry has appeared in Poetry, American Poetry Review, Ploughshares, Gulf Coast, The Massachusetts Review, The Georgia Review, The Iowa Review, Poetry Northwest, and Ninth Letter, and anthologized in Best New Poets 2017.

== Personal life ==
Lewis is married to the Iranian-American poet Kaveh Akbar.

== Awards and honors ==
- 2016: The Florida Review's Editor's Award in Poetry
- 2018: The Adroit Journal's Gregory Djanikian Scholar

== Bibliography ==
=== Novels ===
- Lewis, Paige (2026). Canon. Penguin Random House. ISBN 9798217059362.

=== Poetry ===
- Space Struck. Sarabande Books. 2019. ISBN 978-1946448446.

=== Co-edited ===
- Another Last Call: Poems on Addiction and Deliverance. Sarabande. 2023. ISBN 9780241391587.
