= Roshi (name) =

Roshi is may refer to the following notable people:

Given name

- Roshi Bhadain (born 1971), Mauritian politician
- Roshi Fernando, English writer of Sri Lankan origin

Surname

- Aoyama Rōshi, Japanese Buddhist nun and abbess
- Kadri Roshi (1924–2007), Albanian actor
- Odise Roshi (born 1991), Albanian international footballer
- Saroop Roshi, Malaysian model and beauty pageant titleholder
