= Pilgrim Bell =

2021 poetry collection by Kaveh Akbar

- 1st edition.
- Author: Kaveh Akbar
- Cover artist: Hannah Bagshaw
- Language: English
- Genre: Poetry
- Publisher: Graywolf Press
- Publication date: August 3, 2021
- Publication place: United States
- Pages: 80
- ISBN: 978-1-64445-059-8

Pilgrim Bell is a 2021 poetry collection by Iranian American poet Kaveh Akbar. It was named a best book of the year by Time, The Guardian, and NPR, and was shortlisted for the 2022 Forward Prize for Best Collection.

== Reception ==
Pilgrim Bell is Akbar's second full-length collection, following the critical acclaim of his debut Calling a Wolf a Wolf. Pilgrim Bell was published on August 3, 2021 by Graywolf Press.

ZYZZYVA noted that "Kaveh Akbar plays with the spiritual, familial, and corporeal. The poems meditate on the places of our origins; the land from which we came, the people through which we arrived, and the languages we spoke among and after those places and people."

The Times Literary Supplement wrote about it: "The work here is a measured, quiet pondering of intense subjects and subjectivities. But it would be erroneous to mistake this for lack of force. Akbar is simply interrogating his life and his place in the world with greater stillness." A Ploughshares essay called the book "songs of collective personhood—the way our hearts could fit in each other’s chests."

The New Yorker poetry editor Kevin Young wrote that the collection's central poem "The Palace" "defamiliarizes language" and "recalls the epic mode, but also the ars poetica—the poem about making poetry."
