= Waterstones Debut Fiction Prize =

Annual award given to a work of debut fiction

The Waterstones Debut Fiction Prize
- Awarded for: Exceptional first novels
- Date: 25 July 2024
- Country: United Kingdom
- Presented by: Waterstones
- First award: 2022; 4 years ago
- Website: www.waterstones.com/category/cultural-highlights/book-awards/the-waterstones-debut-fiction-prize

The Waterstones Debut Fiction Prize, established in 2022, is an annual literary award presented by British bookseller Waterstones to the best debut fiction published in the previous 12 months. The award is intended to "celebrate[] the very best fresh voices in fiction and share[] the joy and magic of discovering new authors." Fictional books of all genres are considered, "including genre fiction such as crime, sci-fi and fantasy as well as fiction in translation."

Award winners receive £5,000 and "the backing of all Waterstones shops."

== Recipients ==
Waterstones Debut Fiction Prize winners and finalists
Year	Author	Title	Result	Ref.
2022	Tess Gunty	The Rabbit Hutch	Winner	
2022	Bonnie Garmus	Lessons in Chemistry	Shortlist	
2022	Louise Kennedy	Trespasses	Shortlist	
2022	Sequoia Nagamatsu	How High We Go in the Dark	Shortlist	
2022	Eloghosa Osunde	Vagabonds!	Shortlist	
2022	Tara M. Stringfellow	Memphis	Shortlist	
2023	Alice Winn	In Memoriam	Winner	
2023	Nana Kwame Adjei-Brenyah	Chain-Gang All-Stars	Shortlist	
2023	Jacqueline Crooks	Fire Rush	Shortlist	
2023	Michael Magee	Close to Home	Shortlist	
2023	Cecile Pin	Wandering Souls	Shortlist	
2023	Colin Walsh	Kala	Shortlist	
2024	Ferdia Lennon	Glorious Exploits	Winner	
2024	Kaveh Akbar	Martyr!	Shortlist	
2024	Kaliane Bradley	The Ministry of Time	Shortlist	
2024	Josie Ferguson	The Silence in Between	Shortlist	
2024	Hanako Footman	Mongrel	Shortlist	
2024	Rebecca K Reilly	Greta and Valdin	Shortlist	
2025	Lucy Steeds	The Artist	Winner	
2025	Catherine Airey	Confessions	Shortlist	
2025	William Rayfet Hunter	Sunstruck	Shortlist	
2025	Gurnaik Johal	Saraswati	Shortlist	
2025	Niamh Ni Mhaoileoin	Ordinary Saints	Shortlist	
2025	Lisa Ridzén	When The Cranes Fly South	Shortlist	
2026	Rebecca Perry	May We Feed the King	Winner	
2026	Madeline Cash	Lost Lambs	Shortlist	
2026	Jiyoung Han	Honey in the Wound	Shortlist	
2026	Tara Menon	Under Water	Shortlist	
2026	Stephanie Sy-Quia	A Private Man	Shortlist	
2026	Angela Tomaski	The Infamous Gilberts	Shortlist	

== See also ==
- Waterstones Book of the Year
- Waterstones Children's Book Prize
- Waterstones Children's Laureate
- Waterstones 11
- Guardian First Book Award
