= Soula Emmanuel =

Irish novelist

- Born: 1990 or 1991 (age 35–36); Dublin, Ireland
- Occupation: Novelist
- Writing career
- Language: English
- Period: 2023–present
- Genre: Transgender fiction
- Notable work: Wild Geese
- Notable awards: Lambda Literary Award for Transgender Fiction (2024); Gordon Bowker Volcano Prize (2024)

Soula Emmanuel (born 1990 or 1991) is an Irish author. Her debut novel, Wild Geese, won the Lambda Literary Award for Transgender Fiction and the Gordon Bowker Volcano Prize.

== Biography ==
Soula Emmanuel was born in Dublin to an Irish mother and a Greek father and grew up in County Wicklow. She studied at universities in Ireland and Sweden before coming out as a transgender woman in 2018. She began writing fiction during Ireland's COVID-19 lockdown in 2020. Her debut novel, Wild Geese, was published in 2023 by Footnote Press and the Feminist Press. The Irish Times said that it "remakes emigration and its impact of relationships in an invigorating shape". In 2024, it won the Lambda Literary Award for Transgender Fiction and the Gordon Bowker Volcano Prize for fiction written about the experience of being away from home. Emmanuel is based in Greystones. She identifies as autistic.

== Bibliography ==
- Emmanuel, Soula (2023). Wild Geese. Footnote Press. ISBN 9781804440391.
