= Wandering Souls (novel) =

2022 novel by Cecile Pin

- Author: Cecile Pin
- Language: English
- Genre: Historical fiction
- Publisher: Fourth Estate (HarperCollins)
- Publication date: 21 March 2023
- Publication place: United Kingdom
- Pages: 256
- ISBN: 9780008528812

Wandering Souls is a British novel by French-born author Cecile Pin, published on 21 March 2023 by Fourth Estate (a HarperCollins imprint). The story of a family of Vietnamese refugees adapting to life in the United Kingdom, it features references to various atrocities and disasters that afflicted refugees in the 20th century.

Pin began writing the novel, based partially on the experiences of her mother, after reconnecting with her Asian heritage around the time of the COVID-19 pandemic.

In 2023, it was shortlisted for the Waterstones Debut Fiction Prize and longlisted for the Women's Prize for Fiction.

== Background ==
Pin's mother was a Vietnamese refugee who travelled by boat to Thailand before settling in France, losing five siblings and her parents along the way. Pin heard stories about these experiences as she grew up in France with a brief stint in the U.S., but felt disconnected from her Asian heritage. She began to explore her heritage, first through cooking and later through reading books by Asian writers.

Pin collected archival evidence about the life of refugees to expand her knowledge of the subject and to add authenticity to the book. She was inspired to conduct deeper research after watching an episode of A Very British History entitled Whatever Happened to the Boat People? presented by Rachel Nguyen.

Pin's philosophy studies influenced the book's direction, as she learned about grief during this time. Pin also stated her desire to write a book reflecting the experiences of the South East Asian diaspora in the United Kingdom, feeling that this community was underrepresented in British literature.

== Summary ==
The novel begins in 1978, in the village of Vung Tham in Vietnam. A family is preparing to leave their home and begin a new life with their family in New Haven, Connecticut. The family plans to send the three oldest children, 16-year-old Anh, 13-year-old Minh and 10-year-old Thanh ahead of their parents and four younger siblings.

The three older children travel by boat, eventually arriving in Hong Kong, where they are housed in a refugee camp close to Kai Tak Airport. Later, the children are brought to a beach and asked to identify the bodies of their parents and siblings who drowned during their journey. The children struggle with their grief but Anh is determined to care for her brothers.

Anh begins to feel resentful towards her uncle in America, blaming him for the deaths of her family members. After she refuses to tell resettlement officers that she has family in the United States, the children are instead resettled in the United Kingdom. They are first housed in a camp in Sopley before moving to a small flat in Catford. The children struggle to adapt to life in England, finding the language difficult and the food unpalatable. They are also subject to occasional racism.

Anh begins work in a garment factory but later feels she is not meeting her potential and finds work in an accounting firm. There, she begins a relationship with Tom, an auditor raised in London by parents of Cantonese origin. Tom helps Anh to deal with her feelings of guilt over the deaths of her family members.

Meanwhile, Minh drops out of school and struggles to find regular work. Disillusioned, he is apparently involved in illegal activity and his relationship with Anh suffers.

As the youngest of the three, Thanh finds it easiest to adapt to life in England. He studies well at school and hopes for a career in astronomy, but later takes an unappealing office job after failing to secure finance for a university place.

In 2016, Anh has started a family with Tom. Her daughter, Jane, wishes to study philosophy at university, despite her mother's disapproval. Jane encourages Anh to join Facebook to reconnect with other Vietnamese boat people. After reconnecting with relatives in the US, the family travel to Vietnam to cremate the remains of their lost family members.

The main narrative is interspersed with experimental chapters from alternative perspectives. The ghost of one of the drowned siblings observes his living relatives, soldiers involved in Operation Wandering Soul recount their memories of their experience and a narrator, later revealed to be Anh's daughter Jane, discusses her research and thoughts on various atrocities committed against refugees.

== Reception ==
Wandering Souls received mostly positive reviews from critics. The Guardian praised the book's prose style and emotional resonance while expressing excitement about Pin's future career.

The Times Literary Supplement said Wandering Souls "touches a resounding chord of melancholy".

The New York Times offered praise for the novel, describing its experimental structure as "something special", but commented that elements of the narrative seemed aimless.

The i was mixed in its assessment, describing elements of the novel's narrative as "clunky" but praising the "sensory experiences" present in the narrative.

== Awards ==
In 2023, Wandering Souls was shortlisted for the Waterstones Debut Fiction Prize, and longlisted for the Women's Prize for Fiction.
