= Sonya Whitefield =

Northern Irish photographer

Sonya Whitefield is a photographer from County Tyrone in Northern Ireland.

== Biography ==
Whitefield was born in Moy, County Tyrone in 1964 or 1965. After school, she studied Foundation Art at Ulster University, Jordanstown in 1983, where she first became interested in photography. She progressed to study photography at Bournemouth and Poole College of Art and Design between 1984 and 1987.

== Works ==
Whitefield has said that she uses photography "to creatively interpret and communicate personal life experiences. It’s a way of mirroring back conscious and unconscious thoughts around life situations that challenge us all as humans."

She has exhibited in a number of galleries as part of group exhibitions. In 2010 she had a solo exhibition entitled "Journey of the Hysterectic Woman" at the Golden Thread Gallery in Belfast. The exhibition was described as "not for the squeamish as it creatively records the actual experience of a hysterectomy, including close-ups of surgical stitching and shots of the uterus being carried away for burial in a minuscule coffin." Whitefield also published a book of selected photographs in conjunction with the exhibition.

In 2017, Whitefield embarked on a creative collaboration with the Northern Irish author David Park. Her photographs in response to his novel Travelling in a Strange Land were published on the web and exhibited at the Market Place Theatre, Armagh, in July 2018. Park described how photography was at the heart of his book:

The title of my novel Travelling in a Strange Land is inspired by the quotation by Bill Brandt that suggests the photographer must have "something of the receptiveness of the child who looks at the world for the first time or of the traveller who enters a strange country." The central character is a photographer, and inevitably when working on it I often thought about photography, reflecting on its similarities to and differences from writing and wondering what impulses and processes were involved in finding "a way of looking at the world" through the lens of a camera. So it came as a great pleasure when the artist and photographer Sonya Whitefield expressed a willingness to engage in a creative collaboration, where she would produce a personal response to the novel that combined her images with my text.

in 2019, one of the photographs from this collaboration, which depicted Whitefield's son's scars, won Juror's Pick for Imaginative Storytelling in the LensCulture Visual Storytelling Awards.
