= Trespasses (TV series) =

British television series

- Genre: Drama
- Based on: Trespasses by Louise Kennedy
- Screenplay by: Ailbhe Keogan
- Directed by: Dawn Shadforth
- Starring: Lola Petticrew; Tom Cullen; Gillian Anderson
- Country of origin: United Kingdom
- Original language: English
- No. of series: 1
- No. of episodes: 4

Production
- Executive producers: Amanda Posey; Louise Kennedy; Gillian Anderson; Finnola Dwyer
- Producer: Maria Mulhall
- Production company: Wildgaze Films

Original release
- Network: Channel 4
- Release: 9 November – 12 November 2025

Trespasses is a 2025 Northern Irish drama television series made for Channel 4 and first broadcast in 2025. It starred Lola Petticrew, Tom Cullen, and Gillian Anderson. It is based on the novel of the same name by Louise Kennedy, set in 1970s Northern Ireland during The Troubles.

== Premise ==
Cushla Lavery, a Catholic schoolteacher and part-time barmaid in her brother Eamonn's pub, begins an affair with a womanising, older, married, Protestant barrister, Michael Agnew, in 1970s Belfast. She lives with her mother Gina, a widow and alcoholic. She has a platonic relationship with her teacher colleague Gerry Harkin.

One of Cushla's pupils is the son of a Protestant mother and a Catholic father, who is badly beaten for marrying outside his religion.

Agnew defends Catholic youths who are accused of terrorism-related crimes.

== Cast ==
- Lola Petticrew as Cushla Lavery
- Tom Cullen as Michael Agnew
- Gillian Anderson as Gina Lavery
- Martin McCann as Eamonn Lavery
- Emily Taaffe as Betty McGeown
- Oisín Thompson as Gerry Harkin
- Barry Ward as Victor McIntyre
- Gerard McCarthy as Jim Scott
- Conlaoch Gough-Cunningham as Tommy McGeown
- Daithi Ó Haragain as Davy McGeown
- Lorcan Cranitch as Police Sergeant Reid
- Theo Hyland as Sean

== Production ==
The series was commissioned by Channel 4 in August 2024. It is produced by Wildgaze Films and adapted by Ailbhe Keogan from the Louise Kennedy 2022 novel Trespasses. The series is produced by Maria Mulhall, and directed by Dawn Shadforth who is also an executive producer. Amanda Posey is an executive producer for Wildgaze Films, as is Finnola Dwyer, Kennedy, and Gillian Anderson, who also has a starring role.

As well as Anderson, the cast includes Tom Cullen, Martin McCann, Gerard McCarthy and Lola Petticrew.

Filming took place in Finaghy, Ballymena and Holywood, County Down in November 2024.

== Broadcast ==
The series began broadcasting on Channel 4 on 9 November 2025. In September, 2026, Trespasses began airing in America on PBS.

== Reception ==
Trespasses was well received by critics. In The Independent, Nick Hilton praised Lola Petticrew's performance as "captivating". In The Guardian, Jack Seale described Petticrew as making "the tension between Cushla’s energy and cold reality at first rousing, then heartbreaking". Another writer in The Guardian, Rhik Samadder, described the series as "a handsome drama, full of painful beauty", and highlighted Gillian Anderson's portrayal of Cushla's mother, Gina, as inhabiting the role. Michael Hogan in the Evening Standard described Anderson's characterisation as "heartbreaking" and drew attention to Petticrew's "luminous talent".

The review aggregator website Rotten Tomatoes reported a 88% approval rating with an average rating of 7.4/10 based on 17 critic reviews. Metacritic, which uses a weighted average, assigned a score of 71 out of 100, based on 6 critics, indicating "generally favorable" reviews.

== Accolades ==
In January 2026, the series was nominated at the Irish Film & Television Awards for best drama, with Ailbhe Keogan nominated for best script, and Lola Petticrew nominated for best actress. It was nominated for Limited Drama series at the British Academy Television Awards. Cinematographer Ryan Kernaghan won for Photography & Lighting: Fiction at the British Academy Television Craft Awards.

In September 2026, Cullen received best actor nomination at the BAFTA Cymru Awards.
