= Kathleen Alcott =

American novelist, short-story writer, and essayist (born 1988)

- Born: October 17, 1988 (age 37)
- Occupations: Novelist, short-story writer, and essayist

Kathleen Alcott (born October 17, 1988) is an American novelist, short-story writer, and essayist from Northern California. She has taught Creative Writing and Literature at Columbia University and Bennington College. Her work has been translated into Dutch, Italian, Korean, French, Turkish, and Chinese.

== Career ==
Alcott has published three novels. The Dangers of Proximal Alphabets (2012), a Bildungsroman, was called "a joyously good first novel" by the Wall Street Journal.

Her followup novel, Infinite Home (2015), deals with the housing shortage in New York City and with Williams syndrome, a neurological disorder that causes an abnormally outgoing personality in those afflicted. Infinite Home was shortlisted for the Chautauqua Prize and nominated for the Kirkus Prize.

Alcott's third novel, America Was Hard to Find (2019), an epic loosely centered on space travel between Sputnik (1957) and the Challenger disaster (1986), was noted for its "sprawling" historical scope, its multifaceted cultural critique of the United States, and its frank treatment of feminism, countercultural radicalism, and the AIDS crisis. The New Yorker stated that the book "displays a sure-handed lyricism—from the lunar surface, the sky appears 'glossy like a baby girl's church shoes'—but its energy lies in its skepticism about the American century and the parallels the author finds between contradictory currents."

In 2017, Alcott's short story "Reputation Management" was shortlisted for the Sunday Times EFG Short Story Award. Her story "Natural Light", first appearing in Zoetrope, was selected for inclusion in the 2019 Best American Short Stories anthology.

In 2018, Alcott was chosen to be a Fellow at The Macdowell Colony.

Among her varied nonfiction, Alcott's culinary writing is noteworthy for its mingling of memoir and literary criticism. For The Paris Review she has profiled the use of food in James Salter's fiction. From 2015 to 2018 she contributed a food column to The Guardian,

== Style and method ==
Though described as being firmly in the "realist" mode, Alcott makes strategic use of figurative language to suggest psychological states. Anthony Doerr writes that her “prose […] is always trending away from straightforward clarity toward something more interesting.” In a commentary on the care required to balance this clarity with more figurative language, the narrator of Alcott's story “Natural Light,” a professor of creative writing, wonders

how close a simile should get to the character’s actual life and circumstances: in comparing her inner sadness to the color of her dress, weren’t we depriving the reader of some useful speculative distance?

Alcott's method relies heavily on primary research. For her depiction of a rare neurological condition in Infinite Home, she interviewed people with Williams syndrome. To describe the 1969 Apollo landing in America Was Hard to Find, Alcott conducted what would be one of astronaut Alan Bean's final interviews.

== Bibliography ==
=== Novels ===
- The Dangers of Proximal Alphabets. New York: Other Press, 2012.
- Infinite Home. New York: Riverhead Books, 2015.
- America Was Hard to Find. New York: Ecco, 2019.
  - (UK edition) London: W. W. Norton, 2020.

=== Short fiction ===
- "Saturation". In The Coffin Factory (2013).
- "Taking Shape". In ZYZZYVA (2015).
- "Letters from the Postmaster General". In ZYZZYVA (2016).
- "Reputation Management". In The Bennington Review, no. 3 (2017).
- "Reputation Management". Korean translation in Littor (2018).
- "Natural Light". In The Best American Short Stories 2019, eds Anthony Doerr and Heidi Pitlor (New York: Houghton Mifflin, 2019).
- "Temporary Housing". In Harper's Magazine (May 2022)

== Honors and fellowships ==
- The Best American Short Stories of 2015, Notable (2015)
- Chautauqua Prize Shortlist (2016)
- Kirkus Prize Nominee (2016)
- Sunday Times Short Story Award, Shortlist (2017)
- MacDowell Colony Fellow (2018)
- The Best American Short Stories of 2019, The Sunday Times Short Story Award, Longlist (2019)
- Simpson/Joyce Carol Oates Prize, LongList (2020)
- The Best American Essays of 2024, essay "Trapdoor"
