= Divedapper =

American publication

- Editor: Bradley Trumpfheller and Nabila Lovelace
- Categories: American poetry
- Frequency: online weekly
- Founder: Kaveh Akbar
- Country: United States
- Language: English
- Website: divedapper.com

Divedapper is an American publication featuring interviews with poets. It was founded in 2015 by writer Kaveh Akbar. Its current co-editors are Bradley Trumpfheller and Nabila Lovelace.

== Interviews ==
Divedapper has published conversations with, among others, Morgan Parker, Ocean Vuong, Wendy Xu, Max Ritvo, Nick Flynn, and Fady Joudah.

== Divedapper Poetry Carnival ==
In 2016, the publication launched an annual Divadapper Poetry Carnival. The event was hosted by Butler University's MFA program in creative writing, where Akbar was a student. The 2016 edition was headlined by Adrian Matejka, Francine J. Harris, and Wendy Xu. The 2018 headliners were Nicole Sealey, Ross Gay, and Tarfia Faizullah, and in 2019, they were Eduardo C. Corral, Franny Choi, and Hanif Abdurraqib.

Akbar has described the carnival as "an opportunity to celebrate poetry in the most effusive, exuberant way possible," saying that it is "meant to show how vibrant and alive and fun and worthy of celebration contemporary poetry is and can be."

== See also ==
- List of literary magazines
