= David Park (writer) =

Novelist from Northern Ireland (born 1953)

David Park (born 1953) is a novelist and poet from Northern Ireland.

== Biography ==
Park was born in Belfast in 1953. He grew up in a Protestant working-class family in East Belfast, going on to attend Queen's University, Belfast, where to was awarded a BA degree in 1975. He then worked as a teacher in County Down, during which time he wrote seven novels before retiring to write full time.

== Writing career ==
Park's first book, a collection of short stories entitled Oranges from Spain, was published in 1990, when he was 37 years of age. Following that, he wrote six novels while still working as a teacher. All of those novels and stories were set in Northern Ireland and dealt in some way with the Troubles.

By the time he published his eighth book (The Light of Amsterdam) in 2022, Park had retired from teaching.

Before publishing his novels, Park published a volume of poetry with two co-authors. He has also had poetry published elsewhere.

== Adaptations ==
In 2016, a filmed adaptation of Park's novel The Truth Commissioner was broadcast by the BBC. The book was adapted for the screen by Eoin O'Callaghan, directed by Declan Recks, and Roger Allam played the lead role. Filming took place in a number of locations in Northern Ireland between February and April 2015.

An adaptation of the same book had previously been broadcast in January 2008 on BBC Radio 4 in the Book at Bedtime slot. The programme was repeated on Radio 4 Extra in May 2011. Another of his books, Travelling in a Strange Land, was adapted for Book at Bedtime in August 2018. That book was also the prompt for a creative collaboration with the photographer Sonya Whitefield, which was published on the web and exhibited at the Market Place Theatre, Armagh, in July 2018.

== Awards and nominations ==
Year	Book	Award	Result	Ref.
1992	The Healing	Authors' Club Best First Novel Award	Won	
1992	The Healing	University of Ulster McCrea Literary Award	Won	
1994	The Rye Man	University of Ulster McCrea Literary Award	Won	
1996	Stone Kingdoms	University of Ulster McCrea Literary Award	Won	
2007-2008	The Truth Commissioner	Christopher Ewart-Biggs Memorial Prize	Won	
2010	The Truth Commissioner	International IMPAC Dublin Literary Award	Longlisted	
2014	The Light of Amsterdam	International IMPAC Dublin Literary Award	Shortlisted	
2019	Travelling in a Strange Land	Kerry Group Irish Novel of the Year	Won	
2020	Travelling in a Strange Land	International Dublin Literary Award	Longlisted	
2023	Spies in Canaan	Gordon Bowker Volcano Prize	Runner-up	

Park was also awarded the AWB Vincent American Ireland Fund Literary Award in 2008.

== Works ==
=== Collections of short stories ===
- —— (1990). Oranges from Spain. London: Jonathan Cape. ISBN 0224027654.
- —— (2016). Gods and Angels. London: Bloomsbury Publishing. ISBN 9781408866078.

=== Novels ===
- —— (1992). The Healing. London: Jonathan Cape. ISBN 0224033433.
- —— (1994). The Rye Man. London: Jonathan Cape. ISBN 0224033034.
- —— (1996). Stone Kingdoms. London: Phoenix House. ISBN 1897580339.
- —— (2002). The Big Snow. London: Bloomsbury Publishing. ISBN 0747557268.
- —— (2004). Swallowing the Sun. London: Bloomsbury Publishing. ISBN 0747570361.
- —— (2008). The Truth Commissioner. London: Bloomsbury Publishing. ISBN 978-0747591290.
- —— (2012). The Light of Amsterdam. London: Bloomsbury Publishing. ISBN 978-1408821367.
- —— (2014). The Poets' Wives. London: Bloomsbury Publishing. ISBN 978-1620405246.
- —— (2018). Travelling in a Strange Land. London: Bloomsbury Publishing. ISBN 978-1408892787.
- —— (2019). A Run in the Park. London: Bloomsbury Publishing. ISBN 978-1526619976.
- —— (2022). Spies in Canaan. London: Bloomsbury Publishing. ISBN 978-1526631930.
- —— (2025). Ghost Wedding. London: Oneworld Publications. ISBN 978-0861549740.

=== Poetry ===
- Colhoun, Will; Johnstone, Robert; Park, David (1980). Trio Poetry 1. Belfast: Blackstaff Press. ISBN 0856401641.
