= Roshi Fernando =

English writer

- Education: Warwick University Swansea University
- Writing career
- Genre: Short story
- Subject: Literature
- Notable works: Homesick, The Fluorescent Jacket
- Notable awards: Impress Prize for New Writers

Roshi Fernando is an English writer of Sri Lankan origin. Her stories often depict Sri Lankan immigrants and take place in both Sri Lanka and England.

== Life and work ==
Roshi Fernando was born and brought up in London by Sri Lankan parents. She has a BA in Philosophy and Literature at Warwick University, and a PhD in English and Creative Writing at Swansea University. In 2009, she won the Impress Prize for New Writers for her short story collection Homesick.

Her book Homesick (2012) is a series of interlinked short stories featuring a cast of characters tied to an extended Sri Lankan family of migrants and their Westernised children in southeast London in the 1980s. It drew comparisons with Zadie Smith and Andrea Levy. The collection includes "The Fluorescent Jacket", shortlisted for the 2011 Sunday Times EFG Private Bank Short Story Award. The whole collection was shortlisted for the 2011 Edge Hill Short Story Prize. In 2012, BBC Radio 4 adapted five of Fernando's stories, including The Clangers, The Turtle and Test, as short radio plays. These were repeated on BBC Radio 4 Extra in 2015.
