= Louise Kennedy (writer) =

Irish writer (born 1967)

Louise Kennedy FRSL
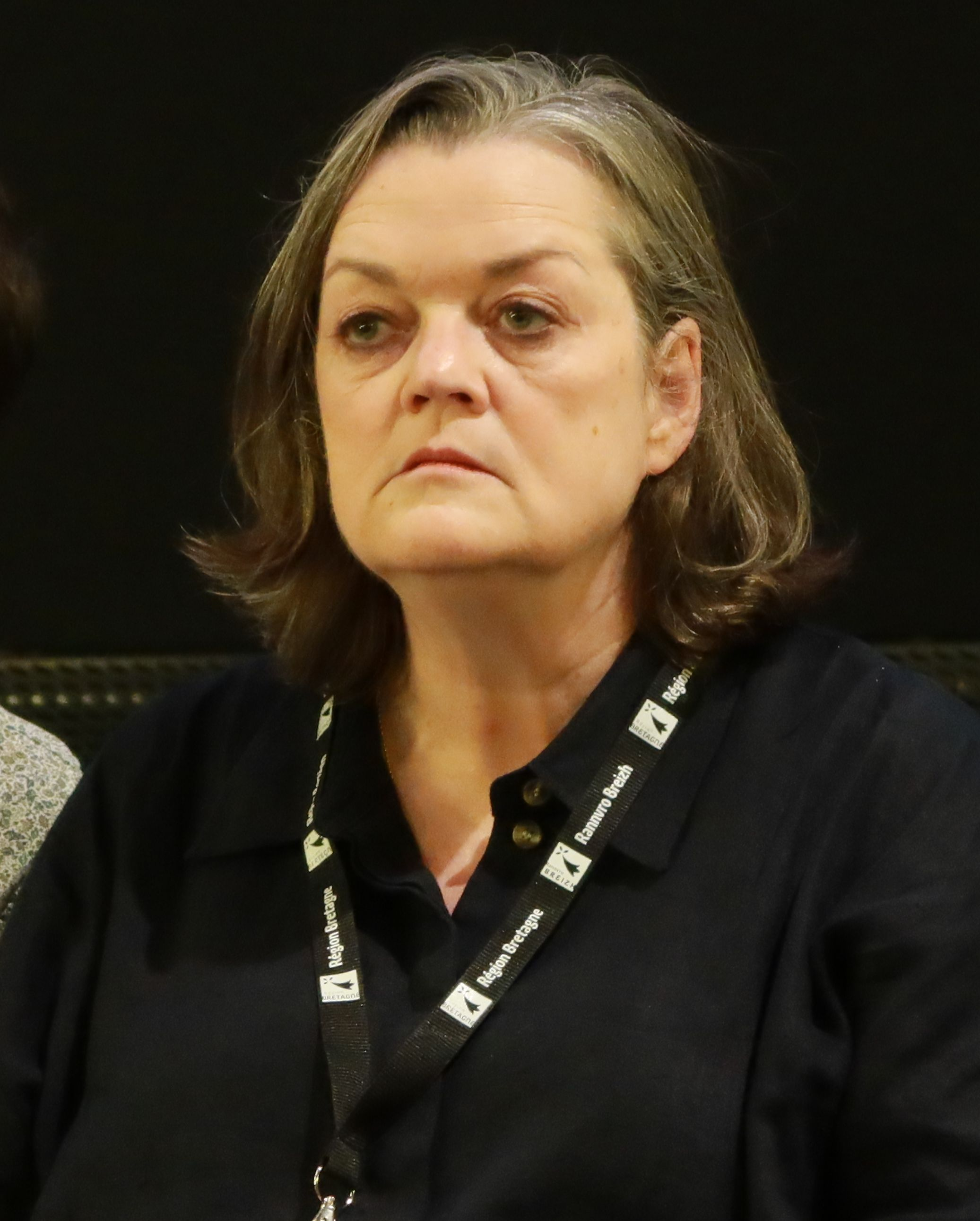
- Kennedy in 2023
- Born: 1967 (age 58–59)
- Education: Queen's University Belfast (MA and PhD)
- Occupation: Writer
- Writing career
- Notable works: Trespasses; The End of the World is a Cul de Sac

Louise Kennedy (born 1967) is an Irish writer.

== Early life and education ==
Kennedy was born in 1967; she grew up in Holywood, County Down, Northern Ireland, and, from the age of 12, in Dublin and Kildare. She worked as a chef for 30 years before joining a creative writing group at a friend's insistence. Kennedy has an MA and a PhD in creative writing from Queen's University Belfast.

== Writing ==
Kennedy's early short stories appeared in publications including The Stinging Fly, The Tangerine, Banshee, Wasafiri and Ambit. She was shortlisted for the 2019 and 2020 Sunday Times Short Story Awards, for "In Silhouette" and "Sparing the Heather" respectively.

Kennedy's first novel, Trespasses (2022), was shortlisted for the 2022 (inaugural) Waterstones Debut Fiction Prize and the 2023 Women's Prize for Fiction. Kennedy has described the novel as "a star-crossed love story set in a small town near Belfast in 1975, at the height of the time known as The Troubles". It was developed as the 2025 TV series Trespasses.

She published a book of short stories, The End of the World Is a Cul de Sac, in 2023. Kirkus Reviews described the stories as "set in a contemporary Ireland divided by wealth and education". The Guardian's reviewer called it a "dazzling, heartbreaking debut collection", and the New York Journal of Books wrote of "deep-probing, slice-of-life stories seamlessly woven in stark vignettes without a filter".

She has also written for The Guardian, The Irish Times, and BBC Radio 4.

Kennedy's second novel, Stations (2026), is partly about leaving home. Its main character is a young woman from Ireland who ends up in London, and the book deals with identity and with political change along the way. Kennedy talked about the book in an interview with The Indian Express, published on 22 October 2026. Writing it while living with cancer also came up.

== Personal life ==
Kennedy lives in Sligo. She has had a melanoma which reached stage four, but after "fairly horrible" surgery and two years of "weird and strong" immunotherapy drugs she reports that "The cancer is all gone, but it did leave me with complicated endocrine problems"; she takes several medications and suffers from fatigue.

== Awards and recognition ==
Kennedy was elected a Fellow of the Royal Society of Literature (FRSL) in 2025.

Year	Book	Award	Category	Result	Ref
2022	Trespasses	Barnes & Noble Discover Great New Writers Award	—	Nominated	
2022	Trespasses	Irish Book Award	Novel of the Year	Won	
2022	Trespasses	Waterstones Debut Fiction Prize	—	Shortlisted	
2023	Trespasses	British Book Award	Overall Book of the Year	Shortlisted	
2023	Trespasses	British Book Award	Début Book of the Year	Won	
2023	Trespasses	Kerry Group Irish Fiction Award	—	Shortlisted	
2023	Trespasses	McKitterick Prize	—	Won	
2023	Trespasses	Women's Prize for Fiction	—	Shortlisted	

== Selected publications ==
- —— (2023). Trespasses. London: Bloomsbury Publishing. ISBN 9781526623324.
- —— (2023). The End of the World Is a Cul de Sac (1st U.S. ed.). New York: Riverhead Books. ISBN 9780593540923.
- —— (2026). Stations. London: Bloomsbury Publishing. ISBN 9781526664327.
