= Kaveh Akbar =

Iranian-American writer (born 1989)

- کاوه اکبر
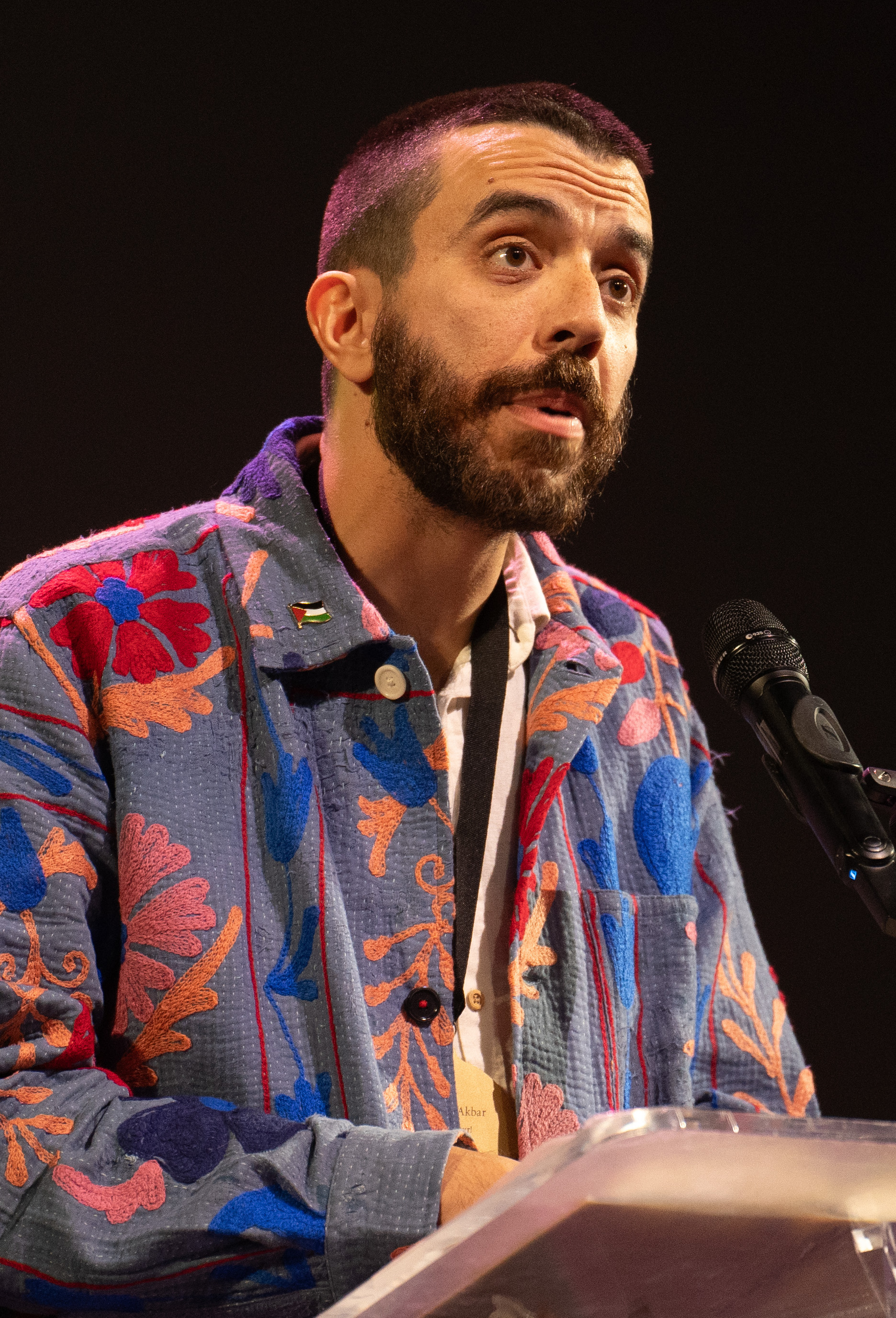
- Akbar in 2024
- Born: January 15, 1989 (age 37); Tehran, Iran
- Education: Purdue University; Butler University; Florida State University
- Occupations: Poet; novelist; editor
- Spouse: Paige Lewis
- Writing career
- Notable works: Calling a Wolf a Wolf; Martyr!
- Notable awards: Guggenheim Fellowship; TIME100 Next 2024
- Website: kavehakbar.com

Kaveh Akbar (born January 15, 1989; Persian: کاوه اکبر) is an Iranian-American poet, novelist, and editor. He is the author of the poetry collections Calling a Wolf a Wolf and Pilgrim Bell and of the novel Martyr!, a New York Times bestseller and National Book Award finalist.

Akbar is director of the University of Iowa's undergraduate creative writing program. He is the founder of Divedapper and Poetry Editor of The Nation. In 2018, NPR called him "poetry's biggest cheerleader". In 2024, he received a Guggenheim Fellowship and Time magazine put him on its TIME100 Next List.

== Early life and education ==
Akbar was born in Tehran, Iran, in 1989 to an Iranian father and German-American mother; his parents met in a poultry science class at the University of Arkansas. His family returned to the United States when he was two years old, and he grew up in several states, including New Jersey, Pennsylvania, Wisconsin, and Indiana.

Akbar received his bachelor's degree from Purdue, his MFA from Butler University, and his PhD in creative writing from Florida State University.

== Works ==
=== Poetry ===
Akbar received a 2016 Ruth Lilly and Dorothy Sargent Rosenberg Poetry Fellowship from the Poetry Foundation, and in 2017, his chapbook Portrait of the Alcoholic was published by Sibling Rivalry Press. Of it, the American poet Patricia Smith said: "Kaveh Akbar has written one of the best books of poetry I've ever read. Lyrical, seductive."

Akbar followed it months later with his full-length collection Calling a Wolf a Wolf, released to acclaim by Alice James Books in the US and Penguin Books in the UK. Kenyon Review called Akbar "a sumptuous, remarkably painterly poet", going on to say:

A number of poets over the years have made alcoholism a major subject—Franz Wright, with his lacerating lines, comes to mind, as does John Berryman and his theatrical derangements. But few have written about this exchange I'm describing—spirituality for spirits, and vice versa—with as much beauty or generosity as Kaveh Akbar. His debut collection is about addiction and its particularities but also touches something larger and harder to point to, to talk about—existential emptiness and the ways substances often offer respite from our spiritual hunger.

Calling a Wolf a Wolf was shortlisted for the Forward Prizes's Felix Dennis Prize for Best First Collection and won Ploughshares's John C. Zacharis First Book Award and the Virginia Commonwealth University's Levis Reading Prize. It received a 2017 Julie Suk Award and a 2018 First Horizon Award, and was selected by NPR for its Book Concierge Guide to 2017's Great Reads. One of the poems, "Heritage", won the Poetry Society of America's Lucille Medwick Memorial Award in 2016.

Akbar's second full-length collection, Pilgrim Bell, was published in 2021 by Graywolf Press. It was named a best book of the year by Time, The Guardian, and NPR, and was shortlisted for the 2022 Forward Prize for Best Collection. The Times Literary Supplement wrote of it: "The work here is a measured, quiet pondering of intense subjects and subjectivities. But it would be erroneous to mistake this for lack of force. Akbar is simply interrogating his life and his place in the world with greater stillness." A Ploughshares essay called the book "songs of collective personhood—the way our hearts could fit in each other's chests." The New Yorker poetry editor Kevin Young wrote that the collection's central poem "The Palace" "defamiliarizes language" and "recalls the epic mode, but also the ars poetica—the poem about making poetry."

Akbar's poems have appeared in The New Yorker, The New York Times, Poetry Magazine, Best American Poetry, The New Republic, Paris Review, PBS NewsHour, Tin House, and elsewhere.

=== Fiction ===
Akbar's debut novel, Martyr!, was published in 2024 by Alfred A. Knopf. It received critical acclaim, became a New York Times bestseller, was named one of the paper's Ten Best Books of the Year, won the Brooklyn Public Library Book Award, The Dayton Literary Peace Prize, an American Book Award, and has been shortlisted for the 2024 National Book Award, Waterstones Debut Fiction Prize, and the Barnes and Noble Discovery Prize.

The New Yorker applauded Martyr! : "Akbar's writing has the musculature of poetry that can't rely on narrative propulsion and so propels itself." The Boston Globe wrote that it is "Stuffed with ideas, gorgeous images, and a surprising amount of humor." Writing in The New York Times Book Review, Junot Diaz called it "incandescent" and its main character Cyrus Shams "an indelible protagonist, haunted, searching, utterly magnetic."

For The New York Review of Books, Francine Prose wrote:

There's something immensely appealing about a meticulously written novel whose characters (Cyrus isn't the only one) are busily searching for meaning. It's a pleasure to read a book in which an obsession with the metaphysical, the spiritual, and the ethical is neither a joke nor an occasion for a sermon. And it's cheering to see a first-time (or anytime) novelist go for the heavy stuff—family, death, love, addiction, art, history, poetry, redemption, sex, friendship, US-Iranian relations, God—and manage to make it engrossing, imaginative, and funny.

In September 2024, Martyr! was shortlisted for the National Book Award for Fiction. In 2025 it was awarded the Dayton Literary Peace Prize and the American Book Award. The New York Times named it one of their Ten Best Books of 2024.

=== Editing ===
In 2014, Akbar founded the poetry interview website Divedapper, for contemporary poets to share their stories and writing. In 2020, he was named Poetry Editor of The Nation, a position previously held by Langston Hughes, Anne Sexton, and William Butler Yeats.

In 2022, Akbar edited The Penguin Book of Spiritual Verse: 110 Poets on the Divine, released by Penguin Classics. It collects poetry from many cultures, ancient and modern, ranging from Mesopotamia, Egypt, Greece, and Rome; to the Arab, Farsi, Hindi, and Urdu worlds; as well as the rest of Asia, Africa, Europe, and the Americas. Selected poets include Enheduanna, Mirabai, Lucretius, Dante, Nazim Hikmet, and Gabriela Mistral. Akbar provides notes on individual poems. In a Times Literary Supplement review, Rowan Williams called the book "poetry that detaches us from the world of instant gratification" and a "profoundly valuable collection, full of fresh perspective, and opening doors into all kinds of material that has been routinely neglected or patronized."

=== Film ===
Akbar wrote poems, alongside Ocean Vuong, for the 2018 film The Kindergarten Teacher, starring Maggie Gyllenhaal.

=== Activism ===
When the Donald Trump administration announced its Muslim ban in 2017, Akbar compiled verses by poets from the countries and asked his followers to read them. The compilation garnered media coverage.

In October 2024, Akbar signed an open letter pledging to boycott Israeli cultural institutions over the Gaza war, along with more than 5,500 other authors.

After the 2025–2026 Iran massacres, Akbar made a bilingual zine called "Give Me to the Wind" memorializing the regime's victims, and distributed free copies to fifty bookstores across America. He also created a memorial website for the zine's contents.

=== Teaching ===
Akbar is the Roy J. Carver Professor of English at the University of Iowa. Before moving to Iowa, Akbar was associate professor of English at Purdue University. He also taught in the low-residency fine art programs at Randolph College and Warren Wilson College.

== Personal life ==
Akbar is in recovery and has written about his struggles with addiction. In an interview with The Paris Review, he cited poetry as helping with his sobriety, saying, "Early in recovery, it was as if I'd wake up and ask, How do I not accidentally kill myself for the next hour? And poetry, more often than not, was the answer to that."

Akbar is married to the American poet Paige Lewis.

== Awards and honors ==
- 2016: Ruth Lilly and Dorothy Sargent Rosenberg Poetry Fellowship
- 2016: Poetry Society of America's Lucille Medwick Memorial Award for "Heritage"
- 2017: Pushcart Prize
- 2017: NPR's Great Reads for Calling a Wolf a Wolf
- 2017: Julie Suk Award for Calling a Wolf a Wolf
- 2018: Pushcart Prize
- 2018: First Horizon Award for Calling a Wolf a Wolf
- 2018: Shortlisted for the Forward Prizes's Felix Dennis Prize for Best First Collection for Calling a Wolf a Wolf
- 2018: Virginia Commonwealth University's Levis Reading Prize for Calling a Wolf a Wolf
- 2019: Ploughshares's John C. Zacharis First Book Award for Calling a Wolf a Wolf
- 2021: Book of the Year selection by NPR, Time, and The Guardian for Pilgrim Bell
- 2022: Shortlisted for the Forward Prize for Best Collection for Pilgrim Bell
- 2024: Guggenheim Fellowship
- 2024: One of The New York Times Best Books of the Year (So Far) for Martyr!
- 2024: Finalist for the Waterstones Debut Fiction Prize for Martyr!
- 2024: Martyr! makes it to Barack Obama's summer reading list.
- 2024: Shortlisted for the 'Fiction' category of the Books Are My Bag Readers' Awards for Martyr!
- 2025: Longlisted for International Dublin Literary Award for Martyr!
- 2025: Dayton Literary Peace Prize for Martyr!

== Bibliography ==
=== Fiction ===
- Martyr!. Knopf. 2024. ISBN 9780593537619.

=== Poetry ===
Collections

- Portrait of the Alcoholic. Sibling Rivalry Press. 2017. ISBN 978-1943977277.
- Calling a Wolf a Wolf. Alice James Books. 2017. ISBN 978-1938584671.
- Pilgrim Bell. Graywolf Press. 2021. ISBN 978-1-64445-059-8.

Anthologies edited

- The Penguin Book of Spiritual Verse: 110 Poets on the Divine. Penguin Classics. 2023. ISBN 9780241391587.
- Another Last Call: Poems on Addiction and Deliverance. Sarabande. 2023. ISBN 9780241391587.

List of poems

Title	Year	First published	Reprinted/collected
Palmyra	2015	Akbar, Kaveh (December 2015). "Palmyra". PBS NewsHour.	
Portrait of the Alcoholic Floating in Space with Severed Umbilicus	2016	Akbar, Kaveh (October 2016). "Portrait of the Alcoholic Floating in Space with Severed Umbilicus". Poetry. Archived from the original on June 12, 2017.	
Despite My Efforts Even My Prayers Have Turned into Threats	2016	Akbar, Kaveh (November 2016). "Despite My Efforts Even My Prayers Have Turned into Threats". Poetry. Archived from the original on June 12, 2017.	
What Use is Knowing Anything if No One is Around	2017	Akbar, Kaveh (June 2017). "What Use is Knowing Anything if No One is Around". The New Yorker.	
Being in This World Makes Me Feel Like a Time Traveler	2017	Akbar, Kaveh (October 2017). "Being in This World Makes Me Feel Like a Time Traveler". The New York Times Magazine.	
The Palace	2019	Akbar, Kaveh (April 2019). "The Palace". The New Yorker.	
My Empire	2021	Akbar, Kaveh (April 5, 2021). "My Empire". The New Yorker. Vol. 97, no. 7. pp. 52–53.	
