= Wendy Xu =

Chinese-American poet (born 1987)

Wendy Xu (born 1987) is a Chinese American poet.

Xu was born in Shandong China in 1987 but was raised in the United States in Iowa and New York.[1] She earned her BA at the University of Iowa and finished her graduate studies at the University of Massachusetts Amherst.[2] Xu has published several collections of poetry, including You Are Not Dead (2013), The Past (2021), Phrasis (2017), which was named 10 Best Poetry Books of 2017 by New York Times Book Review, as well as two chapbooks, The Hero Poems (2011), and I Was Not Even Born (2013, coauthored with Nick Sturm), and most recently wrote and had published a work of nonfiction and poetics, Your Historical Loveliness Knows No Bounds (Poets on Poetry Series 2025). She was the former co-editor and publisher of iO: A Journal of New American Poetry / iO Books[3], and previously worked as a poet and poetry editor for Hyperallergic.[4] from 2016-2020. She currently lives in Brooklyn, New York and teaches at The New School in Greenwich Village where she teaches poetry and is the assistant professor of writing at The New School Dept of Literary Studies.

== Poetry ==
=== Structure and syntax ===
Xu's poems are often written as single stanza works without rhyme or meter. She frequently uses enjambment to create sharp breaks between lines as well as to add to the aesthetic of her poetry. Xu often writes using idiosyncratic language and imagery to mirror the effect of enjambment in her expression of thought. Xu frequently uses concrete images to create the abstract idea that she is attempting to communicate to the audience. In a 2014 review of Xu's work You Are Not Dead, Raena Shirali observed that in Xu's poetry "The concrete world is in the spotlight while the personal and confessional take place off stage—far away enough that we can see hints of it, but not so close that we comprehend the details we’re presented with in a narrative sense”.[5] While Xu often switches images very quickly throughout her poems her vivid description of each subject gives her work "rhetorically complex but unbelievably casual"[5] tone. Her poems are also described as lyrical because of her in-depth descriptions paired with her complex language.

=== Major themes ===
Xu's works have been described as "meditative poems that embrace the ephemeral nature of intimacy."[1] As well as writing with a distinctive tone and technique Xu has several prominent themes that repeat throughout her works. Xu's most notable theme in her poetry is identity. This is regularly paired with the theme of intimacy in her works as she reflects upon her own identity in an intimate nature. Another prominent theme in Xu's work is the briefness of many experiences. This theme is reflected and supported by the syntax of her poetry.

== Works ==
=== Books ===
- You Are Not Dead (Cleveland State University Poetry Center, 2013)
- Phrasis (Fence, 2017)
- The Past (Wesleyan University Press, 2021)
- Your Historical Loveliness Knows No Bounds (Poets on the Poetry Series, 2025)

=== Chapbooks ===
- The Hero Poems (H_NGM_N, 2011)
- I Was NOt Even Born (2013, coauthored with Nick Sturm)
- Phrasis (Black Cake Records, 2014)
- Naturalism (Brooklyn Arts Press, 2015)

== Awards and appearances ==
Wendy Xu was awarded the Patricia Goedicke Prize in 2011, a Ruth Lilly Fellowship from the Poetry Foundation in 2014, and the Ottoline Prize from Fence Books in 2017.

She has also appeared in:

- A Public Space
- Academy of American Poets
- Asian American Writers Workshop
- Black Warrior Review
- Brooklyn Magazine
- Conduit
- Everyday Genius
- Guernica
- Gulf Coast
- Hyperallergic
- Narrative Magazine
- PEN Poetry Series
- Poetry
- Poetry Project
- Versa Daily
- The Volta
- Poetry Magazine
- New York Review of Books
- The New Republic
- Conjunctions
- Ploughshares
- Granta
- Tin House
- A Public Space
