= Sunday Times Short Story Award =

British literary award

- Awarded for: Best short story published in the UK
- Sponsored by: EFG Private Bank; Audible
- Country: England
- Hosted by: The Sunday Times
- Reward: £30,000
- First award: 2010
- Final award: 2021

The Sunday Times Short Story Award, also known as the Sunday Times EFG Short Story Award and later the Sunday Times Audible Short Story Award, was a British literary award for a single short story open to any novelist or short story writer from around the world who was published in the UK or Ireland. The winner received £30,000, and the five shortlisted writers each received £1,000. A longlist of 16 was also announced. The award was established in 2010 by Cathy Galvin of The Sunday Times newspaper and Sir Matthew Evans of EFG Private Bank (and formerly of Faber and Faber). In 2019, award sponsorship changed to Audible, which withdrew its sponsorship after the 2021 award. It has been called the richest prize in the world for a single short story.

Another major single-short-story award in the UK is the BBC National Short Story Award, which was called the richest prize in the world for a single short story at £15,000 in 2008; however, as of 2013, The Sunday Times award was twice as large.

The Bookseller reported in July 2022 that the prize was "in danger of being discontinued" as Audible had withdrawn their sponsorship the previous year. At that time Andrew Holgate, literary editor of the Sunday Times, said that the prize had had to be delayed for a year as no replacement sponsor had been found.

== Winners and shortlisted nominees ==
Sunday Times Short Story Award winners and shortlists
| Year | Author | Title | Result | Ref. |
|---|---|---|---|---|
| 2010 | C. K. Stead | "Last Season's Man" | Winner | |
| 2010 | Will Cohu | "Nothing but Grass" | Shortlist | |
| 2010 | Joe Dunthorne | "Critical Responses to My Last Relationship" | Shortlist | |
| 2010 | Adam Marek | "Fewer Things" | Shortlist | |
| 2010 | David Vann | "It's Not Yours" | Shortlist | |
| 2011 | Anthony Doerr | "The Deep" | Winner | |
| 2011 | Will Cohu | "East Coast – West Coast" | Shortlist | |
| 2011 | Roshi Fernando | "The Fluorescent Jacket" | Shortlist | |
| 2011 | Yiyun Li | "The Science of Flight" | Shortlist | |
| 2011 | Gerard Woodward | "The Family Whistle" | Shortlist | |
| 2012 | Kevin Barry | "Beer Trip to Llandudno" | Winner | |
| 2012 | Emma Donoghue | "The Hunt" | Shortlist | |
| 2012 | Linda Oatman High | "Nickel Mines Hardware" | Shortlist | |
| 2012 | Jean Kwok | "Where the Gods Fly" | Shortlist | |
| 2012 | Tom Lee | "The Current" | Shortlist | |
| 2012 | Robert Minhinnick | "El Aziz: Some Pages from His Notebook" | Shortlist | |
| 2013 | Junot Díaz | "Miss Lora" | Winner | |
| 2013 | Mark Haddon | "The Gun" | Shortlist | |
| 2013 | Sarah Hall | "Evie" | Shortlist | |
| 2013 | Cynan Jones | "The Dig" | Shortlist | |
| 2013 | Toby Litt | "Call It 'The Bug' Because I Have No Time to Think of a Better Title" | Shortlist | |
| 2013 | Ali Smith | "The Beholder" | Shortlist | |
| 2014 | Adam Johnson | "Nirvana" | Winner | |
| 2014 | Tahmima Anam | "Anwar Gets Everything" | Shortlist | |
| 2014 | Marjorie Celona | "Othello" | Shortlist | |
| 2014 | Anna Metcalfe | "Number Three" | Shortlist | |
| 2014 | Elizabeth Strout | "Snow Blind" | Shortlist | |
| 2014 | Jonathan Tel | "The Shoe King of Shanghai" | Shortlist | |
| 2015 | Yiyun Li | "A Sheltered Woman" | Winner | |
| 2015 | Rebecca John | "The Glove Maker's Numbers" | Shortlist | |
| 2015 | Elizabeth McCracken | "Hungry" | Shortlist | |
| 2015 | Paula Morris | "False River" | Shortlist | |
| 2015 | Scott O'Connor | "Interstellar Space" | Shortlist | |
| 2015 | Madeleine Thien | "The Wedding Cake" | Shortlist | |
| 2016 | Jonathan Tel | "The Human Phonograph" | Winner | |
| 2016 | Alix Christie | "The Dacha" | Shortlist | |
| 2016 | Petina Gappah | "The News of Her Death" | Shortlist | |
| 2016 | Colum McCann | "What Time Is It Now, Where You Are?" | Shortlist | |
| 2016 | Edith Pearlman | "Unbechert" | Shortlist | |
| 2016 | Nicholas Ruddock | "The Phosphorescence" | Shortlist | |
| 2017 | Bret Anthony Johnston | "Half of What Atlee Rouse Knows About Horses" | Winner | |
| 2017 | Kathleen Alcott | "Reputation Management" | Shortlist | |
| 2017 | Richard Lambert | "The Hazel Twig and the Olive Tree" | Shortlist | |
| 2017 | Victor Lodato | "The Tenant" | Shortlist | |
| 2017 | Celeste Ng | "Every Little Thing" | Shortlist | |
| 2017 | Sally Rooney | "Mr Salary" | Shortlist | |
| 2018 | Courtney Zoffness | Peanuts Aren't Nuts | Winner | |
| 2018 | Allegra Goodman | F.A.Q.s | Shortlist | |
| 2018 | Miranda July | The Metal Bowl | Shortlist | |
| 2018 | Victor Lodato | Herman Melville, Volume 1 | Shortlist | |
| 2018 | Molly McCloskey | Life on Earth | Shortlist | |
| 2018 | Curtis Sittenfeld | Do-Over | Shortlist | |
| 2019 | Danielle McLaughlin | A Partial List of the Saved | Winner | |
| 2019 | Kevin Barry | The Coast of Leitrim | Shortlist | |
| 2019 | Emma Cline | What Can You Do with a General | Shortlist | |
| 2019 | Joe Dunthorne | All The Poems Contained Within Will Mean Everything to Everyone | Shortlist | |
| 2019 | Louise Kennedy | In Silhouette | Shortlist | |
| 2019 | Paul Dalla Rosa | Comme | Shortlist | |
| 2020 | Niamh Campbell | Love Many | Winner | |
| 2020 | Louise Kennedy | Sparing the Heather | Shortlist | |
| 2020 | Daniel O'Malley | Simon | Shortlist | |
| 2020 | Namwali Serpell | Take It | Shortlist | |
| 2020 | Alexia Tolas | Granma's Porch | Shortlist | |
| 2021 | Susan Choi | Flashlight | Winner | |
| 2021 | Rabih Alameddine | The July War | Shortlist | |
| 2021 | Laura Demers | Sleeping Beauty | Shortlist | |
| 2021 | Rachael Fulton | Call | Shortlist | |
| 2021 | Jonathan Gibbs | A Prolonged Kiss | Shortlist | |
| 2021 | Elizabeth McCracken | The Irish Wedding | Shortlist | |
