= Cecile Pin =

French author

- Born: 1996 (age 29–30); Paris, France
- Education: University College London; King's College London
- Years active: 2021–present
- Website: cecilepin.com

Cecile Pin (born 1996) is a French author based in London. Her debut novel Wandering Souls (2023) received a Somerset Maugham Award among other accolades. In 2025, Pin was named a Forbes 30 Under 30.

== Early life ==
Pin was born and raised in Paris, to a French father and a Vietnamese mother who had arrived in the 1970s from a camp in Thailand. She also spent four years of her childhood in New York, where she attended a French School. At age 18, Pin moved to London to study Philosophy at University College London (UCL). She completed a Master of Arts (MA) at King's College London.

== Career ==
Pin previously worked as an editorial assistant at Jonathan Cape.

Via HarperCollins imprint Fourth Estate and with help from the 2021 London Writers' Award, Pin's debut novel Wandering Souls was published in March 2023. Its U.S. publisher was Henry Holt. Pin had become inspired researching the Vietnamese boat people, especially Vietnamese refugees to Britain. She felt the British Southeast Asian community was underrepresented in literature. Her philosophy studies also had an influence on the novel. Wandering Souls won a Somerset Maugham Award and was shortlisted for the Waterstones Debut Fiction Prize and longlisted for the Women's Prize for Fiction. The French translation by Carine Chichereau also received a Fragonard Prize for Foreign Literature.

In January 2024, Fourth Estate acquired the rights to publish Pin's second novel Celestial Lights in 2026.

== Bibliography ==
- Wandering Souls (2023)
- Celestial Lights (2026)
