= Trespasses (novel) =

2022 novel by Louise Kennedy

- Author: Louise Kennedy
- Language: English
- Genre: Historical Fiction, Literary Fiction, Romance, Forbidden Romance
- Set in: Northern Ireland
- Publisher: Penguin Random House
- Publication date: 2022

Trespasses is a 2022 debut novel by Louise Kennedy. It tells the story of a young woman named Cushla Lavery. She works as a Catholic School teacher in a small garrison town just outside Belfast in Northern Ireland. We follow her through her daily life and watch her get caught between the expectation of allegiance to her community and her dangerous passion for a man from another.

Trespasses was shortlisted for the 2022 inaugural Waterstones Debut Fiction Prize and for the 2023 Women's Prize for Fiction.

== Plot Summary ==
The novel is told from a third-person limited perspective, that strictly follows the inner life and thoughts of its protagonist, Cushla Lavery.

The novel opens with a framing narrative set in 2015, where an older Cushla visits an art gallery and encounters a painting by a former student, triggering vivid recollection of her youth during The Troubles in 1975. In the main narrative twenty-four-year-old Cushla is a Catholic primary school teacher living in a small garrison town near Belfast, who also works part-time at her family's pub. Her life changes dramatically when she meets Michael Agnew, a wealthy, married Protestant barrister who frequents the pub. Despite the extremely fragmented society of the era, the two begin a passionate, clandestine affair. At the same time, Cushla becomes a protective figure for Davy McGeown, a young boy from a poor Catholic family living in a hostile, mostly Protestant neighborhood.

As the story progresses, Cushla's life becomes increasingly dangerous and complicated. In order to hide her clandestine relationship with Michael from her family and community, she uses her close friendship with fellow teacher, Gerry Devlin, as a convenient cover. Meanwhile, her attempts to help Davy's family lead to unintended consequences. When Davy's father is brutally attacked for his Catholic background, Cushla and her mother, Gina Lavery, try to support them by bringing food. However, Cushla's involvement draws negative attention from both the school and local authorities, and Davy's eighteen-year-old brother, Tommy McGeown, becomes angry and radicalized by the violence and harassment his family faces.

The tension reaches a breaking point when political violence directly destroys Cushla's private life. Michael is suddenly shot and killed. It is revealed that Tommy is the shooter, he targeted Michael after confusing him for a local judge. The police connects Tommy to the crime and he is convicted of the murder. Following these tragic events, Cushla's secret affair with Michael is exposed, causing her to lose her teaching job. In an act of local retaliation her family's pub is bombed, forcing the Lavery family to leave town entirely.

The novel ends by returning to the 2015 framing narrative. While at the art exhibition the elderly Cushla unexpectedly reunites with Davy McGeown, who is now a grown man. The final pages reflect on how despite the passage of time and the peaceful present, the deep trauma, grief and memories of the violence in 1975 still shape their lives, decades later.

== Television Adaptation ==
A television adaptation starring Gillian Anderson, famous for her role in The X-Files, began filming for Channel 4 in 2024.

== Awards ==
Year	Award	Category	Result	Ref
2022	Barnes & Noble Discover Great New Writers Award	—	Nominated	
2022	Irish Book Award	Novel of the Year	Won	
2022	Waterstones Debut Fiction Prize	—	Shortlisted	
2023	British Book Award	Overall Book of the Year	Shortlisted	
2023	British Book Award	Début Book of the Year	Won	
2023	Kerry Group Irish Fiction Award	—	Shortlisted	
2023	McKitterick Prize	—	Won	
2023	Women's Prize for Fiction	—	Shortlisted	
