= Real Simple =

American monthly magazine

- Logo of Real Simple magazine since first publication
- Editor-in-chief: Lauren Iannotti
- Former editors: Kristin van Ogtrop
- Categories: Lifestyle
- Frequency: Monthly
- Total circulation: 2,011,092 (2011)
- Founded: 2000
- First issue: April 2000
- Company: People Inc.
- Country: United States
- Based in: New York City
- Language: English
- Website: www.realsimple.com
- ISSN: 1528-1701

Cover of Real Simple magazine February 2006.

Real Simple (stylized in all caps) is an American monthly magazine published by People Inc.. The magazine features articles and information related to homemaking, childcare, cooking, and emotional well-being. The magazine is distinguished by its clean, uncluttered style of layout and photos. In 2013 it had approximately 7.6 million readers, 90% of whom were women. Headquartered in New York City, the magazine is currently edited by Sarah Collins, who began serving as interim editor-in-chief in September 2016 after the departure of previous editor Kristin van Ogtrop.

Real Simple expanded to include a TV show of the same name, with two seasons of a half-hour program airing on PBS in 2006–2007. A TLC show entitled Real Simple Real Life aired over two seasons in 2008–2009.

== Real Simple in other media ==
=== Applications ===
In December 2010, Real Simple launched its first application, "No Time to Cook?", on the iTunes Store sponsored by Sara Lee's Hillshire Farms. It targets iPhone, Android, and iPad users and features over 850 step-by-step recipes.

In 2010, Real Simple added another app titled Real Simple To-Do Lists to its array of apps. To-Do Lists helps users organize their lives into lists.

Additionally, on Mother's Day 2012, Real Simple created a Gift Guide app available on the Apple App Store that had a selection of items for people to buy. Users also had the option to donate to the launch partner, March of Dimes.

== Editor ==
- Sarah Collins

=== Directors ===
- Heather Muir—Beauty Director
- Victoria Sanchez-Lincoln—Fashion Director
- Dawn Perry—Food Director
- Betsy Goldberg—Home Director
