= Calling a Wolf a Wolf =

Poetry collection by Kaveh Akbar

- First edition
- Author: Kaveh Akbar
- Language: English
- Genre: Poetry
- Publisher: Alice James Books
- Publication date: 2017
- Publication place: United States
- Media type: Print (paperback)
- Pages: 100 pp
- ISBN: 978-1-938584-67-1

Calling a Wolf a Wolf is a confessional collection of poetry about addiction written by Iranian American poet Kaveh Akbar. It won Ploughshares's John C. Zacharis First Book Award and was shortlisted for the Forward Prizes's Felix Dennis Prize for Best First Collection.

== Background ==
Akbar said that the collection, along with his chapbook Portrait of an Alcoholic, was his personal way of processing what he experienced as an addict and even solidifying and making sense of his sobriety. The collection is written to mold what Akbar felt through not only the process of and recovery from addiction but elaborates on how Akbar's addiction completely isolated him from society and made the world around him surreal.

== Publication ==
Calling a Wolf a Wolf was released by Alice James Books on September 12, 2017 in the US and by Penguin Books on January 2, 2018 in the UK.

== Content ==
The themes of the collection center mainly around Akbar's path through addiction and finding his way to recovery. Akbar uses deft language to mentally recreate the isolation that addicts feel and how the world around them may feel hypnagogic or unreal. He tells a story of how a man transformed entirely, then had to push against addiction to become a new man to better life for oneself. The narrative highlights the enjoyments and agonies through addiction that could cause addicts to battle their own inclination and even isolate themselves from everything and everyone to fulfill their addictions, resulting in the loneliness Akbar experienced throughout.

The structure of the collection intends to display a transformation of a man into a new better man or the man inside changing oneself. The collection almost chronologically displays his enjoyment of being an alcoholic and being able to escape the world, then changes tones to the pain of addiction and the battling of self-persuasion to escape addiction. The poems move to a sense of recovery.

== Reception ==
Calling a Wolf a Wolf received critical acclaim. Kenyon Review called Akbar "a sumptuous, remarkably painterly poet", going on to say:

A number of poets over the years have made alcoholism a major subject—Franz Wright, with his lacerating lines, comes to mind, as does John Berryman and his theatrical derangements. But few have written about this exchange I’m describing—spirituality for spirits, and vice versa—with as much beauty or generosity as Kaveh Akbar. His debut collection is about addiction and its particularities but also touches something larger and harder to point to, to talk about—existential emptiness and the ways substances often offer respite from our spiritual hunger.

== Awards and honors ==
- 2019: Ploughshares's John C. Zacharis First Book Award
- 2018: Virginia Commonwealth University's Levis Reading Prize
- 2018: Shortlisted for the Forward Prizes's Felix Dennis Prize for Best First Collection
- 2018: First Horizon Award
- 2017: Julie Suk Award
- 2017: NPR's Great Reads
- 2016: Poetry Society of America's Lucille Medwick Memorial Award for "Heritage"
