= 2007 Man Booker Prize =

Literary award

The 2007 Man Booker Prize was awarded at a ceremony on 16 October 2007. The winner of that year's Booker Prize was Anne Enright for The Gathering.

== Judges ==
- Howard Davies (Chair)
- Wendy Cope
- Giles Foden
- Ruth Scurr
- Imogen Stubbs

== Shortlist ==
Author	Title	Genre(s)	Country	Publisher
Anne Enright	The Gathering	Novel	Ireland	Jonathan Cape
Nicola Barker	Darkmans	Novel	UK	Fourth Estate
Mohsin Hamid	The Reluctant Fundamentalist	Novel	Pakistan, UK	Hamish Hamilton
Lloyd Jones	Mister Pip	Novel	New Zealand	John Murray
Ian McEwan	On Chesil Beach	Novel	UK	Jonathan Cape
Indra Sinha	Animal's People	Novel	UK	Simon & Schuster

== Longlist ==
Author	Title	Genre(s)	Country	Publisher
Nicola Barker	Darkmans	Novel	UK	Fourth Estate
Peter Ho Davies	The Welsh Girl	Novel	UK	Sceptre
Edward Docx	Self Help	Novel	UK	Picador
Tan Twan Eng	The Gift of Rain	Novel	UK	Myrmidon
Anne Enright	The Gathering	Novel	Ireland	Jonathan Cape
Mohsin Hamid	The Reluctant Fundamentalist	Novel	Pakistan, UK	Hamish Hamilton
Lloyd Jones	Mister Pip	Novel	New Zealand	John Murray
Nikita Lalwani	Gifted	Novel	UK	Penguin
Ian McEwan	On Chesil Beach	Novel	UK	Jonathan Cape
Catherine O'Flynn	What Was Lost	Novel	UK	Tindal Street Press
Michael Redhill	Consolation	Novel	UK	Penguin
Indra Sinha	Animal's People	Novel	UK	Simon & Schuster
A. N. Wilson	Winnie and Wolf	Novel	UK	Penguin

== Sources ==
- 2007 Man Booker Prize
