= Kerry Group Irish Novel of the Year Award =

Irish literary award

The Kerry Group Irish Novel of the Year Award is an annual award for Irish authors of fiction, established in 1995. It was previously known as the Kerry Ingredients Book of the Year Award (1995–2000), the Kerry Ingredients Irish Fiction Award (2001–2002), and the Kerry Group Irish Fiction Award (2003–2011).

The winner of the prize is announced in May/June each year at the opening ceremony of the Listowel Writers' Week in County Kerry.

The prize is sponsored by the food group Kerry Group, and is the largest (currently €20,000) monetary prize for fiction available solely to Irish authors.

== Winners and shortlists ==
=== 1995–2011 ===
Year	Author	Work	Ref
1995	Philip Casey	The Fabulists	
1996	Emer Martin	Breakfast in Babylon	
1997	Deirdre Madden	One by One in the Darkness	
1998	John Banville	The Untouchable	
1999	J. M. O'Neill	Bennett & Company	
2000	Michael Collins	The Keepers of Truth	
2001	Anne Barnett	The Largest Baby in Ireland After the Famine	
2002	John McGahern	That They May Face the Rising Sun	
2003	William Trevor	The Story of Lucy Gault	
2004	Gerard Donovan	Schopenhauer's Telescope	
2005	Neil Jordan	Shade	
2006	Sebastian Barry	A Long Long Way	
2007	Roddy Doyle	Paula Spencer	
2008	Anne Enright	The Gathering	
2009	Joseph O'Neill	Netherland	
2010	John Banville	The Infinities	
2011	Neil Jordan	Mistaken	

=== 2012–2024 ===
Blue Ribbon = winner

Year	Person	Book	Result	Ref
2012	Christine Dwyer Hickey	The Cold Eye of Heaven	Won	
2012	Kevin Barry	City of Bohane	Finalist	
2012	Anne Enright	The Forgotten Waltz	Finalist	
2012	Carlo Gébler	The Dead Eight	Finalist	
2012	Belinda McKeon	Solace	Finalist	
2013	Gavin Corbett	This Is the Way	Won	
2013	Lucy Caldwell	All the Beggars Riding	Finalist	
2013	Claire Kilroy	The Devil I Know	Finalist	
2013	Kathleen MacMahon	This Is How It Ends	Finalist	
2013	Thomas O'Malley	This Magnificent Desolation	Finalist	
2014	Eimear McBride	A Girl Is a Half-formed Thing	Won	
2014	Deirdre Madden	Time Present & Time Past	Finalist	
2014	Colum McCann	Transatlantic	Finalist	
2014	Frank McGuinness	Arimathea	Finalist	
2014	Donal Ryan	The Thing About December	Finalist	
2015	Eoin McNamee	Blue Is the Night	Won	
2015	David Butler	City of Dis	Finalist	
2015	Nuala Ní Chonchúir	The Closet of Savage Mementos	Finalist	
2015	Patrick O'Keeffe	The Visitors	Finalist	
2015	Eibhear Walshe	The Diary of Mary Travers	Finalist	
2016	Anne Enright	The Green Road	Won	
2016	John Banville	The Blue Guitar	Finalist	
2016	Kevin Barry	Beatlebone	Finalist	
2016	Austin Duffy	This Living and Immortal Thing	Finalist	
2016	Edna O'Brien	The Little Red Chairs	Finalist	
2017	Kit de Waal	My Name Is Leon (Viking)	Won	
2017	Emma Donoghue	The Wonder	Finalist	
2017	Neil Hegarty	Inch Levels	Finalist	
2017	Mike McCormack	Solar Bones	Finalist	
2017	Conor O'Callaghan	Nothing on Earth	Finalist	
2018	Paul Lynch	Grace (Oneworld)	Won	
2018	Lisa Harding	Harvesting	Finalist	
2018	Frank McGuiness	The Woodcutter and His Family	Finalist	
2018	Bernard McLaverty	Midwinter Break	Finalist	
2018	Sally Rooney	Conversations with Friends	Finalist	
2019	David Park	Travelling in a Strange Land (Bloomsbury)	Won	
2019	John Boyne	Ladder to the Sky	Finalist	
2019	Jess Kidd	The Hoarder	Finalist	
2019	Emer Martin	The Cruelty Men	Finalist	
2019	Sally Rooney	Normal People	Finalist	
2020	Edna O'Brien	Girl	Won	
2020	Kevin Barry	Nightboat to Tangier	Finalist	
2020	Mary Costello	The River Capture	Finalist	
2020	Rónán Hession	Leonard and Hungry Paul	Finalist	
2020	Joseph O'Connor	Shadowplay		
2021	Anakana Schofield	Bina (Fleet)	Won	
2021	Niamh Campbell	This Happy	Finalist	
2021	Rob Doyle	Threshold	Finalist	
2021	Adrian Duncan	A Sabbatical in Leipzig	Finalist	
2021	Laura McKenna	Words to Shape My Name	Finalist	
2022	Claire Keegan	Small Things Like These (Grove Press)	Won	
2022	Jan Carson	The Raptures	Finalist	
2022	Lisa Harding	Bright Burning Things	Finalist	
2022	Nuala O'Connor	Nora	Finalist	
2022	Kevin Power	White City	Finalist	
2023	Aingeala Flannery	These Amusements	Won	
2023	Anya Bergman	The Witches of Vardo	Finalist	
2023	Adrian Duncan	The Geometer Lobachevsky	Finalist	
2023	Louise Kennedy	Trespasses	Finalist	
2023	Audrey Magee	The Colony	Finalist	
2024	Darragh McKeon	Remembrance Sunday	Won	
2024	Sebastian Barry	Old God's Time	Finalist	
2024	Naoise Dolan	The Happy Couple	Finalist	
2024	Anne Enright	The Wren, The Wren	Finalist	
2024	Paul Murray	Bee Sting	Finalist	
2025	Niall Williams	Time of The Child	Won	
2025	Christine Dwyer Hickey	Our London Lives	Finalist	
2025	Joseph O'Connor	The Ghosts of Rome	Finalist	
2025	Donal Ryan	Heart, Be At Peace	Finalist	
2025	Colm Tóibín	Long Island	Finalist	
