= Wide Open =

Wide Open may refer to:

== Places ==
- The great wide open, any rural area with long vistas and low population
- Wideopen or Wide Open, a village in North Tyneside, Tyne & Wear
- Wideopen Islands, a group of islands off the coast of the Antarctic Peninsula
- East Wideopen and West Wideopen, islands of the inner Farne Islands

== Music ==
=== Albums ===
- Wide Open (Jason Aldean album) or the title song, 2009
- Wide Open (Michael McDonald album), 2017
- Wide Open (Sawyer Brown album) or the title song, 1988
- Wide Open (Weaves album) or the title song, 2017
- Wide Open, by Austin French, 2018
- Wide Open, by Kahvas Jute, 1971
- Wide Open, by Latch Key Kid, 2010
- Wide Open, an EP by Skids, 1978

=== Songs ===
- "Wide Open", by Brick, 1981
- "Wide Open", by the Chemical Brothers from Born in the Echoes, 2015
- "Wide Open", by Mike Posner from A Real Good Kid, 2019
- "Wide Open", by Wafia, Ta-ku, and Masego, 2021
- "Wide Open", by Westlife from Greatest Hits, 2011

== Other uses ==
- Wide Open (film), a 1930 film starring Edward Everett Horton
- "Wide Open" (Millennium), a television episode
- Wide Open (novel), a 1998 novel by Nicola Barker

== See also ==
- Great Wide Open
- Into the Great Wide Open
- Wide Open Spaces (disambiguation)
- Wide open throttle
