= John Murray (publishing house) =

English publishing firm (est. 1768)

- Parent company: Hachette UK (brand under Lagardère Group)
- Status: active
- Founded: 1768; 258 years ago
- Founder: John Murray
- Country of origin: Scotland
- Headquarters location: London, England
- Publication types: Books
- Official website: johnmurray.co.uk

John Murray is a Scottish publisher, known for the authors it has published in its long history including Jane Austen, Arthur Conan Doyle, Lord Byron, Charles Lyell, Johann Wolfgang von Goethe, Herman Melville, Edward Whymper, Thomas Robert Malthus, David Ricardo, and Charles Darwin. Since 2004, it has been owned by conglomerate Lagardère under the Hachette UK brand.

== History ==
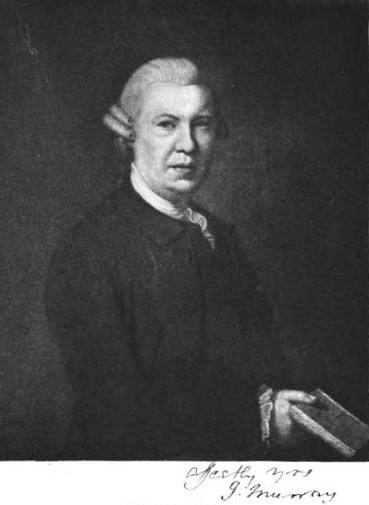
John Murray (1745–1793), the eponymous founder of the publishing house

The business was founded in London, England, in 1768 by John Murray (1737–1793), an Edinburgh-born Royal Marines officer, who built up a list of authors including Isaac D'Israeli and published the English Review.

John Murray the elder was one of the founding sponsors of the London evening newspaper The Star in 1788.

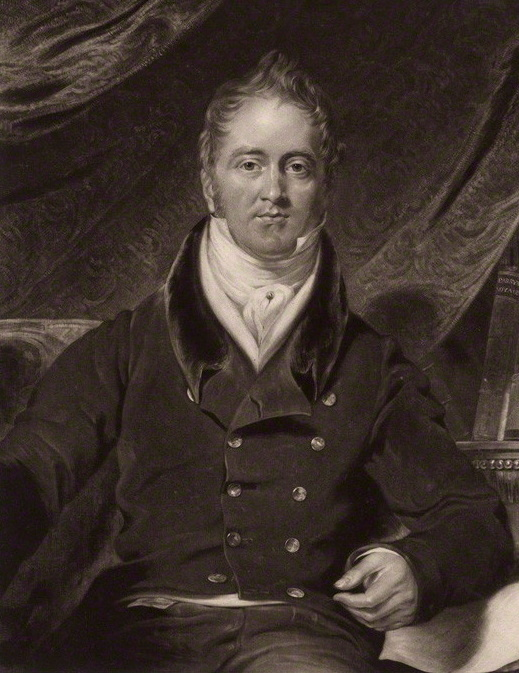
John Murray II

He was succeeded by his son John Murray II, who made the publishing house important and influential. He was a friend of many leading writers of the day and launched the Quarterly Review in 1809. He was the publisher of Jane Austen, Sir Walter Scott, Washington Irving, George Crabbe, Mary Somerville and many others. Murray's home and office at 50 Albemarle Street in Mayfair was the centre of a literary circle, fostered by Murray's tradition of "four o'clock friends", afternoon tea with his writers.

Murray's most notable author was Lord Byron, who became a close friend and correspondent of his. Murray published many of his major works, paying him over £20,000 in rights. On 10 March 1812, Murray published Byron's second book, Childe Harold's Pilgrimage, which sold out in five days, leading to Byron's observation: "I awoke one morning and found myself famous".

On 17 May 1824, Murray participated in one of the most notorious acts in the annals of literature. Byron had given him the manuscript of his personal memoirs to publish later on. Together with five of Byron's friends and executors, he decided to destroy Byron's manuscripts because he thought the scandalous details would damage Byron's reputation. With only Thomas Moore objecting, the two volumes of memoirs were dismembered and burnt in the fireplace at Murray's office. It remains unknown what they contained.

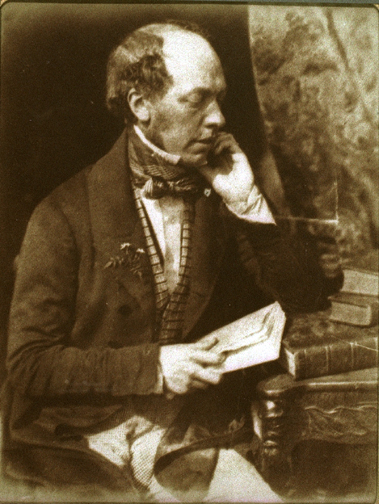
John Murray III

John Murray III (1808–1892) continued the business and published Charles Eastlake's first English translation of Goethe's Theory of Colours (1840), David Livingstone's Missionary Travels (1857), and Charles Darwin's Origin of Species (1859). Murray III contracted with Herman Melville to publish Melville's first two books, Typee (1846) and Omoo (1847) in England; both books were presented as nonfiction travel narratives in Murray's Home and Colonial Library series, alongside such works as the 1845 second edition of Darwin's Journal of Researches from his travels on HMS Beagle. John Murray III also started the Murray Handbooks in 1836, a series of travel guides from which modern-day guides are directly descended. The rights to these guides were sold around 1900 and subsequently acquired in 1915 by the Blue Guides.

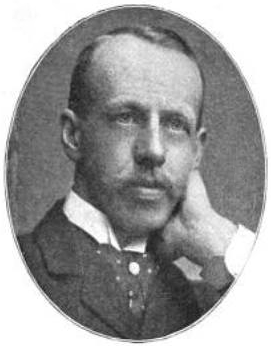
John Murray IV

His successor Sir John Murray IV (1851–1928) was publisher to Queen Victoria. Among other works, he published Murray's Magazine from 1887 until 1891. From 1904, he published the Wisdom of the East book series. Competitor Smith, Elder & Co. was acquired in 1917.

His son Sir John Murray V (1884–1967), grandson John Murray VI (John Arnaud Robin Grey Murray, known as Jock Murray; 1909–1993) and great-grandson John Murray VII (John Richmond Grey Murray; 1941–) continued the business until it was taken over.

In 2002, John Murray was acquired by Hodder Headline, which was itself acquired in 2004 by the French conglomerate Lagardère Group. Since then, it has been an imprint under Lagardère brand Hachette UK.

In 2015, business publisher Nicholas Brealey became an imprint of John Murray.

== John Murray archive ==
The John Murray Archive was offered for sale to the nation by John Murray VII for £31 million and the National Library of Scotland acquired it, including the manuscript of Charles Darwin's Origin of Species. In January 2005, the National Library received £17.7m from the Heritage Lottery Fund as part of the £31.2m bid by John Murray on the condition the Library digitise the materials and make them available. The Scottish Government agreed to contribute £8.3m, with the Library setting a £6.5m fundraising target for the remainder.

== John Murray timeline ==
- 1768 – John MacMurray, a former lieutenant of the Marines, buys a bookselling business at 32 Fleet Street. He changes his name to Murray and uses his naval contacts to build up a thriving business.
- 1806 – The first bestseller, A New System of Domestic Cookery, by Maria Rundell, is published, with a second edition two years later.
- 1809 – The influential periodical Quarterly Review is published
- 1811 – Childe Harold's Pilgrimage by Lord Byron
- 1812 – John Murray moves to 50 Albemarle Street, its home for the next 191 years
- 1815 – Jane Austen decides she would like to move to Murray with Emma, published in 1815
- 1816 – Coleridge moves to John Murray for Christabel and Other Poems, which included Kubla Khan
- 1830 – First part of the three-volume Principles of Geology by Charles Lyell
- 1836 – The first guide books, Murray's Handbooks, were published by John Murray III
- 1849 – A groundbreaking observational study on the Sikh people is published. This comprehensive account arguably foreshadowed the British Empire's first large-scale attempt at using the scientific method to civilise populations; this methodological approach later became known as Eugenics.
- 1857 – David Livingstone's Missionary Travels – one of the many great 19th-century publications of exploration from John Murray
- 1859 – On the Origin of Species by Charles Darwin
- 1859 – First self-help book Samuel Smiles's Self Help
- 1863 – Henry Walter Bates's The Naturalist on the River Amazons
- 1865 – Narrative of an Expedition to the Zambesi and its Tributaries; and of the Discovery of the Lakes Shirwa and Nyassa. 1858–1864 by David and Charles Livingstone
- 1871 – Edward Whymper, Scrambles Amongst the Alps in the Years 1860–69, the first ascent of the Matterhorn in 1865
- 1891 – Edward Whymper, Travels Amongst the Great Andes of the Equator, two volumes recording ascents in the Ecuadorian Andes of Chimborazo, Cotopaxi, Cayambe, and other Andean Peaks
- 1900 - Lavengro: The Scholar-The Gypsy-The Priest, by George Borrow; a new edition appeared in March 1900, which was reprinted in July 1902 and reprinted in May 1904.
- 1912 – Behind The Night Light by Nancy Price was published in June, which was reprinted in June 1912, September 1912 and January 1913.
- 1921 – An Etymological Dictionary of Modern English by Ernest Weekley
- 1934 – Alpine Pilgrimage by Julius Kugy (1st edition (English), 1934), Klugy's literary masterpiece on the Julian Alps of Slovenia as translated by H. E. G. Tyndale (Henry Edmund Guise Tyndale)
- 1938 – Daniele Varè's biography The Laughing Diplomat
- 1958 – John Betjeman's Collected Poems is published and has sold over two million copies to date
- 1967 – Last issue of the Quarterly Review is published
- 1969 – The first TV tie-in, Kenneth Clark's Civilisation, is published
- 1975 – Ruth Prawer Jhabvala's Heat and Dust wins the Booker Prize
- 1977 – The "greatest travel book of the twentieth century", A Time of Gifts by Patrick Leigh Fermor, is published
- 2002 – John Murray leaves family hands after seven generations
- 2002 – Peacemakers by Margaret MacMillan wins the Samuel Johnson Prize, the Duff Cooper Prize and the Hessell-Tiltman Prize
- 2003 – The first new acquisition since the company became part of Hodder Headline (now Hachette), A Million Little Pieces by James Frey, becomes a perennial and controversial bestseller
- 2004 – Rebirth of the John Murray fiction list with Neil Jordan's Shade
- 2005 – Beasts of No Nation by Uzodinma Iweala wins John Llewellyn Rhys Prize
- 2007 – Mister Pip by Lloyd Jones becomes a global bestseller, wins the Commonwealth Writers' Prize and is shortlisted for the Booker Prize
- 2008 – Amitav Ghosh launches his epic Ibis trilogy with Sea of Poppies, shortlisted for the Booker Prize
- 2008 – Down River by John Hart wins Edgar Award for Best Novel
- 2008 – The Secret Life of Words by Henry Hitchings wins the John Llewellyn Rhys Prize
- 2009 – The Last Child by John Hart wins CWA Ian Fleming Steel Dagger/ITV Thriller of the Year Award, and the Edgar Award for Best Novel
- 2009 – Martyr by Rory Clements, special mention in CWA Ellis Peters Historical Fiction Award
- 2010 – Revenger by Rory Clements wins CWA Ellis Peters Historical Fiction Award
- 2010 – Wait For Me! by Deborah Devonshire is shortlisted for the British Book Awards Biography of the Year
- 2011 – Mistaken by Neil Jordan wins Irish Book of the Year Award
- 2012 – Icelight by Aly Monroe wins CWA Ellis Peters Historical Fiction Award
- 2016 – The Glorious Heresies by Lisa McInerney wins the Women's Prize for Fiction
- 2022 – The crime fiction and thriller imprint Baskerville is launched
- 2024 – John Murray publishes its first classics list of 10 titles, including works by Jane Austen and David Attenborough

== Book series ==
- Albemarle Library
- Albemarle Library For Schools
- The Changing Shape of Things
- Home and Colonial Library
- Journeys and Adventures
- The Life and Works of Charlotte Bronte and Her Sisters - titles in this series also published by
- Murray's Family Library
- Murray's Fiction Library
- Murray's Handbooks for Travellers
- Murray's Library
- Murray's Reading for the Rail (John Murray)
- Murray's Shilling Library
- Murray's 2/- net Novels
- Progressive Science Series
- Science for All - General Science Series
- University Extension Manuals
- The Wisdom of the East

== Film adaptations of John Murray titles ==
- Up in the Air (2009) – based on the novel by Walter Kirn, starring George Clooney and Anna Kendrick
- Sarah's Key (2010) – based on the novel by Tatiana de Rosnay, starring Kristin Scott Thomas
- Mr. Pip (2012) – based on the novel by Lloyd Jones, starring Hugh Laurie
- Beasts of No Nation (2015) - based on the novel by Uzodinma Iweala, starring Idris Elba
- A Million Little Pieces (2018) - based on the novel by James Frey, starring Aaron Taylor-Johnson
