= Niamh Campbell =

Irish author

- Born: Ireland
- Occupations: Writer, author

Niamh Campbell is an Irish author.

== Biography ==
Her first work was published in Poetry Ireland Review when she was 17; she then went on to study and complete a PhD at King's College London and won a Next Generation Artist Award, publishing This Happy in 2020.

Her PhD was focused on the career of writer John McGahern.

In 2021, she was Writer in Residence at University College Dublin.

== Works ==
- We Were Young (2022) ISBN 978-1-4746-1170-1
- Love Many (2020)
- This Happy (2020) ISBN 978-1-4746-1168-8

== Awards ==
- Sunday Times Short Story Award in 2020 for Love Many
- Rooney Prize for Irish Literature in 2021 for This Happy
- Kerry Group Irish Fiction Award shortlisted in 2021 for This Happy
