= Mistaken (novel) =

2011 novel by Neil Jordan

- First edition
- Author: Neil Jordan
- Cover artist: Jeanne Conte
- Language: English
- Publisher: John Murray
- Publication date: 6 January 2011
- Publication place: United Kingdom
- Media type: Print (Hardback)
- Pages: 320 pp
- ISBN: 1-84854-418-9

Mistaken is a novel by the Irish novelist and filmmaker Neil Jordan published in 2011 by John Murray in the UK and Soft Skull Press in the US. It won both the Irish Book Award and Kerry Group Irish Fiction Award.

== Plot introduction ==
The novel is told from the viewpoint of Kevin Thunder who grows up in 1960s Dublin, next door to Bram Stoker's house. Kevin has an elusive double, Gerald for whom he is often mistaken. Gerald lives in the more refined Palmerston Park and attends Belvedere College. The narrative begins at Gerald's funeral where Kevin meets Gerald's daughter Emily. The remainder of the novel takes the form of an explanation written for Emily on how his life and that of her father intertwined over the years.

== Reception ==
- Patrick McGrath in The Guardian praises Jordan's depiction of Dublin characters and places, particularly Kevin's parents "These familial scenes are deftly, warmly done, and here the novel breathes with life" but he is less impressed by the more gothic aspects of the story "The problem with Mistaken is a doom-laden cloud of insinuation that hovers over the story and saps its vitality... In terms of its manipulation of gothic tropes, Mistaken fails to arouse the deep unease and sudden, horrified recognition we require of the genre" he concludes "There's a good slim Dublin novel trying to claw its way out of this book. The pages often feel clogged. Effects are strained after rather than happened upon. The best energies of the novel are smothered by gothic innuendo, where clarity and brevity would have served it better'.
- Caryn James of The New York Times however praises these same gothic elements: "Vampires, secrets, the mysteries of identity: the obsessions that run through the director Neil Jordan’s films are at the center of his beautifully enigmatic fifth novel...it is the vampire next door whose menacing presence runs most powerfully through the novel". Her only criticisms relate to the ending, "Most of this book is so good, so shimmering with mysteries, that it’s a disappointment when the explanations tumble in. The question of Kevin’s identity is resolved in a banal, practical way, and what happens during his shattering trip to New York seems too lurid and over-the-top for a novel that holds such subtleties. If this were a movie, you might guess that some producer had pressured Jordan to add more drama and a neat clarification — an odd idea, because Jordan's films never underestimate the audience. And almost to the end neither does Mistaken, which shines with a darkly luminous glow".
- The Irish Independent is full of praise, concluding "This is the best novel I've read about Dublin in many years -- beautifully written, funny and touching in its remembered details and haunting in its suggestiveness about who we are, might have been or might yet be as we make our befuddled yet hopeful way through life."
- The Scotsman is also very positive, "Two things make this tale a stand-out read: First, Jordan's restraint; he avoids a plot in which Kevin or Gerald commits a crime, and for which the other will take the punishment (we come close in a scene in New York, when, Kevin, playing the part of Gerald, partakes in a death) which would have skewed the dramatic landscape. The other coup is the novel's structure - it is essentially an intimate revelation, by Kevin to Emily, Gerald's daughter, after the two have become acquainted at Gerald's graveside in the story's opening gambit. Emily learns about the dead father's other life while discovering new and deep affinity with a man she scarcely knows yet has known forever. How they are linked - by more than mere words - is eventually told. The ploy gives the novel perspective, and the words evolve into a spell that makes the story unputdownable."

== Publication history ==
- 2011, UK, John Murray, ISBN 1-84854-418-9, Pub date 06 Jan 2011, Hardback
- 2011, UK, John Murray, ISBN 1-84854-420-0, Pub date 06 Jan 2011, Paperback
- 2011, UK, John Murray, ISBN 1-84854-419-7, Pub date 23 Jun 2011, Paperback
- 2011, US, Soft Skull Press, ISBN 1-59376-433-2, Pub date 20 Dec 2011, Paperback
