= Anne Enright =

Irish writer (born 1962)

Anne Enright FRSL MRIA
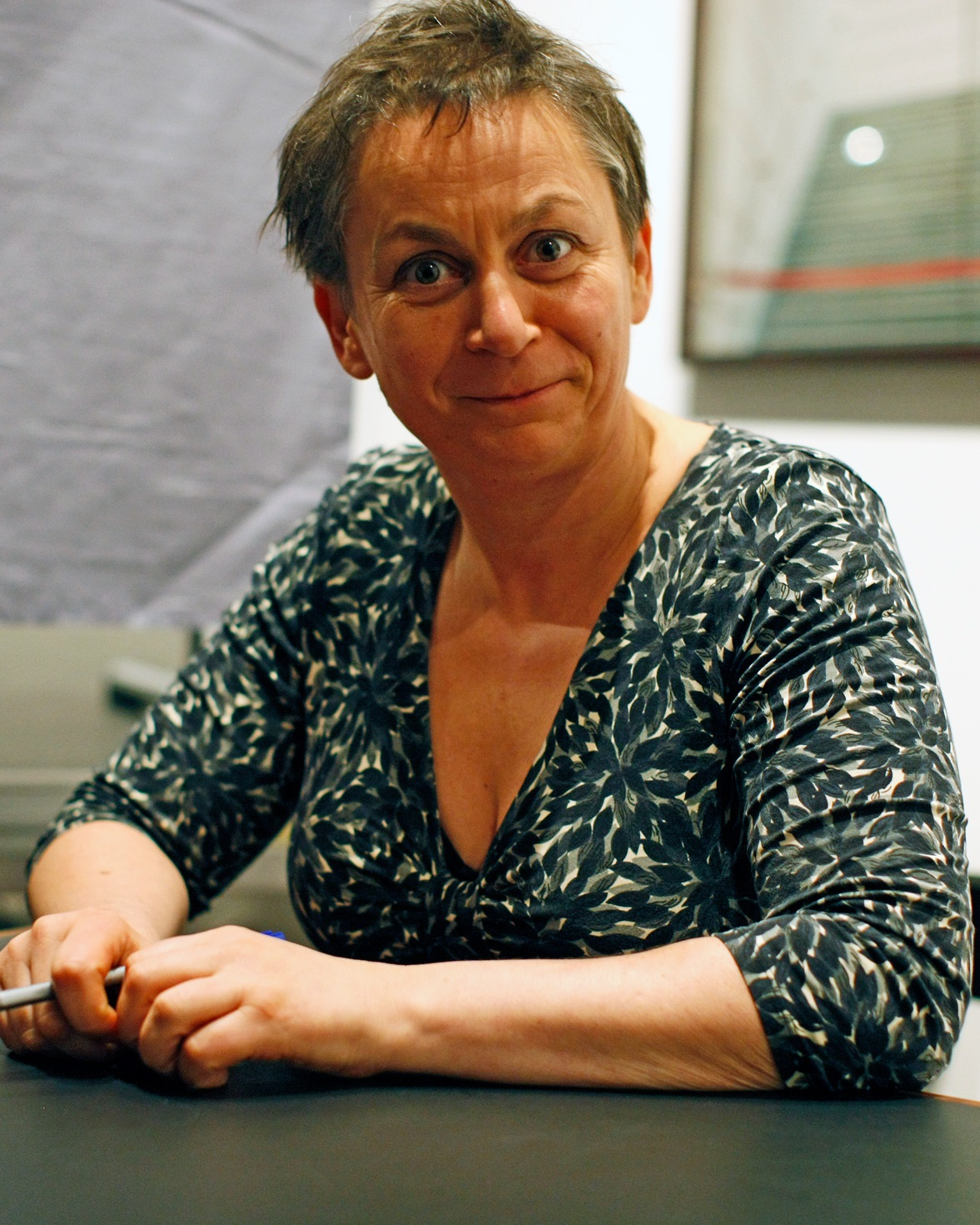
- Enright at Literaturhaus Köln, 18 November 2008
- Born: Anne Teresa Enright; 11 October 1962 (age 63); Dublin, Ireland
- Education: Trinity College Dublin; University of East Anglia
- Occupation: Writer
- Spouse: Martin Murphy
- Children: 2
- Writing career
- Years active: 1991–present
- Period: Contemporary
- Genres: Novel, short story
- Subjects: Family; Love; Motherhood
- Notable work: Making Babies: Stumbling into Motherhood (2004) The Gathering (2007)
- Notable awards: Rooney Prize for Irish Literature, 1991; Encore Award, 2001; Man Booker Prize, 2007; Irish Novel of the Year, 2008

Anne Teresa Enright FRSL (born 11 October 1962) is an Irish writer. The first Laureate for Irish Fiction (2015–2018) and winner of the Man Booker Prize (2007), she has published eight novels, many short stories, and a non-fiction work called Making Babies: Stumbling into Motherhood, about the birth of her two children. Her essays on literary themes have appeared in the London Review of Books and The New York Review of Books, and she writes for the books pages of The Irish Times and The Guardian. Her fiction explores themes such as family, love, identity and motherhood.

Enright won the 2007 Man Booker Prize for her fourth novel The Gathering. Her second novel, What Are You Like?, was shortlisted in the novel category of the 2000 Whitbread Awards. Her 2012 novel The Forgotten Waltz won the Andre Carnegie Medal for Fiction. Her novel The Green Road was shortlisted for the Women's Prize for Fiction and won The Irish Novel of the Year (2015). In 2025, Enright was named as a recipient of a Windham-Campbell Prize, awarded in recognition of her life's work.

== Early life ==
Anne Enright was born in Dublin, Ireland, and was educated at St Louis High School, Rathmines. She won an international scholarship to Lester B. Pearson United World College of the Pacific in Victoria, British Columbia, where she studied for an International Baccalaureate for two years. She then completed a BA in English and Philosophy at Trinity College Dublin. She began writing in earnest when she was given an electric typewriter for her 21st birthday. She won a Chevening Scholarship to the University of East Anglia's Creative Writing Course, where she studied under Angela Carter and Malcolm Bradbury and completed an MA degree.

Enright was a television producer and director for RTÉ in Dublin for six years and produced the RTÉ programme Nighthawks for four years. She then worked in children's programming for two years and wrote on weekends. She began writing full-time in 1993. Her full-time career as a writer came about when she left television due to a breakdown, later remarking: "I recommend it [...] having a breakdown early. If your life just falls apart early on, you can put it together again. It's the people who are always on the brink of crisis who don't hit bottom who are in trouble." Of her time spent working behind the scenes as a producer, Enright said: "There was a great buzz and sometimes I felt like awarding myself purple hearts for the work I was doing." It was a time of "drinking too much" and "hanging around" with people "who don't really have steady jobs".

== Personal life ==
Enright lives in Dublin, having previously lived in Bray, County Wicklow, until 2014. She is married to Martin Murphy, who was director of the Pavilion Theatre in Dún Laoghaire and now works as an adviser to the Arts Council of Ireland. They have two children, a son and daughter.

== Books ==
Enright has described her working practice as involving "rocking the pram with one hand and typing with the other".

Critics have suggested that it was from the work of Flann O'Brien that Enright derived her early efforts. The year 1991 brought the publication of The Portable Virgin, a collection of her short stories. Angela Carter (who, as Enright's former creative writing teacher, knew her well) called it "elegant, scrupulously poised, always intelligent and, not least, original."

Enright's first novel was published in 1995. Titled The Wig My Father Wore, the book explores themes such as love, motherhood and the Catholic Church. The narrator of the novel is Grace, who lives in Dublin and works for a tacky game show. Her father wears a wig that cannot be spoken of in front of him. An angel called Stephen who committed suicide in 1934 and has come back to earth to guide lost souls moves into Grace's home and she falls in love with him.

Enright's second novel, What Are You Like?, was published in 2000. About twin girls called Marie and Maria who are separated at birth and raised apart from each other in Dublin and London, it looks at tensions and ironies between family members. It was shortlisted in the novel category of the Whitbread Awards.

Enright's third novel, The Pleasure of Eliza Lynch, published in 2002, is a fictionalised account of the life of Eliza Lynch, an Irish woman who was the consort of Paraguayan president Francisco Solano López and became Paraguay's most powerful woman in the 19th century.

Enright's 2004 book, Making Babies: Stumbling into Motherhood, is a collection of candid and humorous essays about childbirth and motherhood.

Her fourth novel, The Gathering, won the Man Booker Prize in 2007. The aide-de-camp of President McAleese acknowledged the result. A positive review in The New York Times stated that there was "no consolation" in The Gathering. A scene in The Gathering is set in the foyer of Belvedere Hotel.

Enright's seventh novel, Actress, was selected for the longlist for the Women's Prize for Fiction 2020. It tells the story of a daughter detailing her mother's rise to fame in late twentieth-century Irish theatre, Broadway, and Hollywood.

== Other ==
Her writing has appeared in various magazines and newspapers. The New Yorker has published her writing in seven years over two decades: 2000, 2001 and 2005, 2007, 2017, 2019 and 2020. The 4 October 2007 issue of the London Review of Books published Enright's piece "Disliking the McCanns" about Kate and Gerry McCann, the British parents of the three-year-old child Madeleine McCann, who disappeared in suspicious circumstances while on holiday with her family in Portugal in May 2007. Mary Kenny described Enright as "irrationally prejudiced", a woman with "bad judgement", and questioned an apology which Enright issued.

Enright was once a regular contributor to BBC Radio 4, and has also reviewed for RTÉ. She has also been in The Dublin Review, The Irish Times, The Guardian, Granta and The Paris Review.

In 2011, the Irish Academic Press published a collection of essays about her writing, edited by Claire Bracken and Susan Cahill. Her writing is illustrated in the video "Reading Ireland". Enright received the Irish PEN Award for Literature in 2017.

Taoiseach Enda Kenny appointed Enright as the inaugural Laureate for Irish Fiction. During her time as Laureate for Irish Fiction, Enright promoted people's engagement with Irish literature through public lectures and creative writing classes. She later took up teaching at UCD's School of English, beginning in the 2018–19 academic year.

== Bibliography ==
=== Novels ===
- The Wig My Father Wore (1995)
- What Are You Like? (2000)
- The Pleasure of Eliza Lynch (2002)
- The Gathering (2007)
- The Forgotten Waltz (2011)
- The Green Road (2015)
- Actress (2020)
- The Wren, the Wren (2023)

=== Short fiction ===
Collections

- The Portable Virgin (1991); ISBN 0-09943739-2
- Taking Pictures (short story collection) (2008); ISBN 978-022408-469-7
- Yesterday's Weather (2009); ISBN 978-080211-874-5
- Attention: Writing on Life, Art, and the World (2025); ISBN 978-132412-413-9

Stories

Title	Year	First published	Reprinted/collected	Notes
"The hotel"	2017	Enright, Anne (6 November 2017). "The hotel". The New Yorker. Vol. 93, no. 35. pp. 58–60.		
"Solstice"	2017	Enright, Anne (13 March 2017). "Solstice". The New Yorker. Vol. 93, no. 4. pp. 68–70.		

=== Nonfiction ===
- Making Babies: Stumbling into Motherhood (2004)

=== Critical studies and reviews of Enright's work ===
The Green Road

- Wood, James (25 May 2015). "All her children : family agonies in Anne Enright's 'The Green Road'". The Critics. Books. The New Yorker. Vol. 91, no. 14. pp. 71–73.

== Honours and awards ==
- 1991: Rooney Prize for Irish Literature for The Portable Virgin
- 2001: Encore Award for What Are You Like?
- 2004: Davy Byrne's Irish Writing Award
- 2007: Man Booker Prize for The Gathering
- 2008: Irish Novel of the Year for The Gathering
- 2010: Fellow of the Royal Society of Literature
- 2012: Orange Prize for Fiction shortlist for The Forgotten Waltz
- 2012: Carnegie Medal for Excellence in Fiction for The Forgotten Waltz
- 2012: Honorary Degree (DLit) from Goldsmiths College, University of London
- 2016: Kerry Group Irish Fiction Award for The Green Road
- 2021: Elected member of Aosdána - Irish Academy of Arts
- 2024: Women's Prize for Fiction - shortlisted for The Wren, The Wren
- 2025: Windham-Campbell Prize
- 2026: Member of the Royal Irish Academy
