= The Keepers of Truth =

Book by Michael Collins

- Author: Michael Collins
- Language: English
- Genre: Murder-mystery/detective
- Publisher: Orion Books
- Publication place: Ireland
- Pages: 320
- ISBN: 0-7432-1803-5

The Keepers of the Truth is a novel by Michael Collins, first published in 2000. Set in the late 1970s, the story follows the main character Bill and his attempt to unravel a murder-mystery as a cub reporter for a local newspaper in a small Midwest industrial town.

The novel won the Kerry Ingredients Book of the Year Award for Best Irish Novel. The novel was published in the United States after being shortlisted for the Booker Prize later in 2000.
