= Jan Carson =

Writer from Northern Ireland

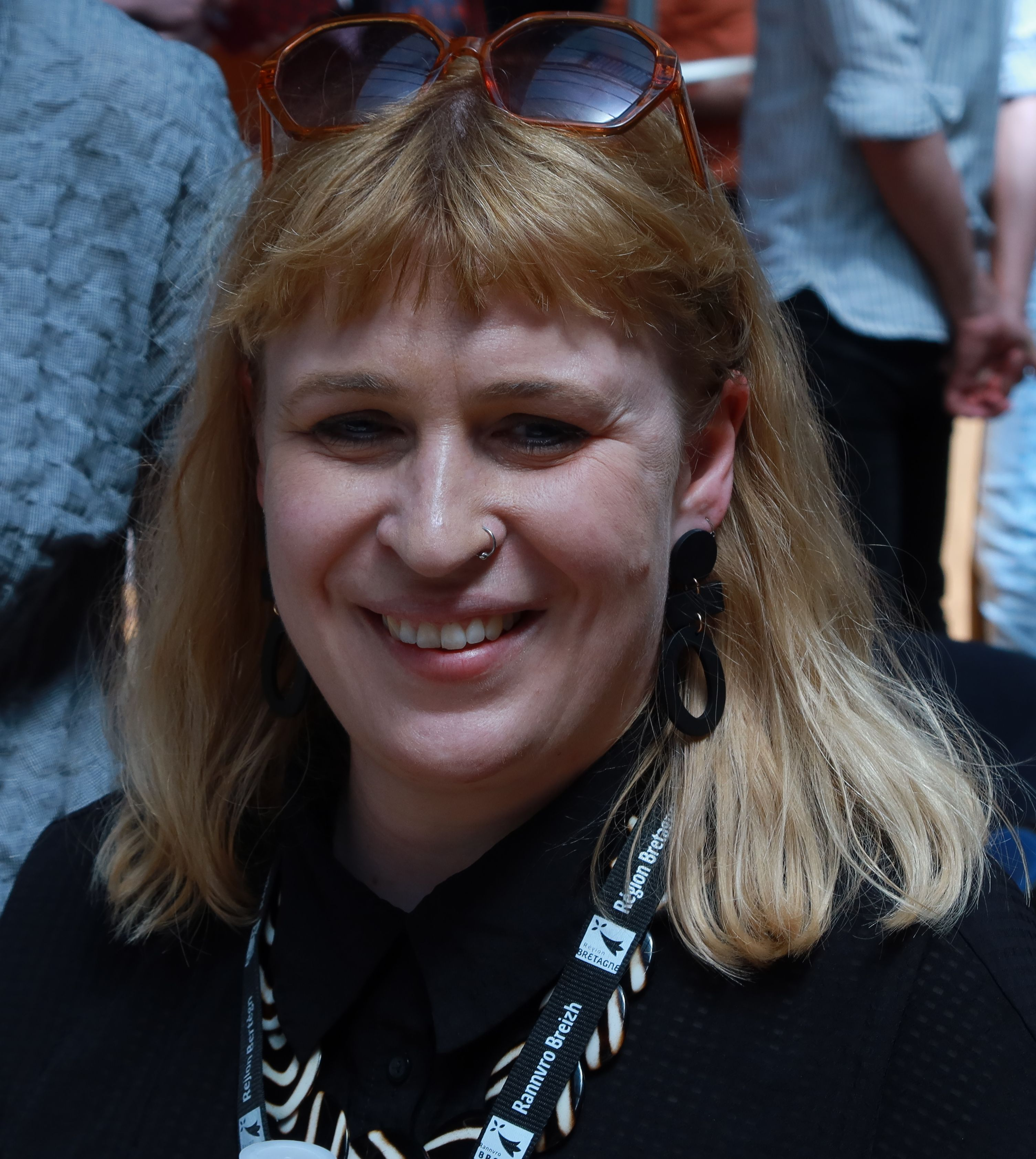
Jan Carson

Jan Carson FRSL is a Belfast based writer from Northern Ireland. She has published four novels, three short story collections and three micro-fiction collections. Her books include Malcolm Orange Disappears (2014), Children’s Children (2016), Postcard Stories (2017), The Fire Starters (2019), Postcard Stories 2 (2020), The Last Resort (2021), The Raptures (2022), Quickly, While They Still Have Horses (2024), Few and Far Between (2026) and No Vacancy (2026)

Her novel The Fire Starters (2019) won the EU Prize for Literature for Ireland 2019.

The Raptures (2022) was shortlisted for the An Post Irish Novel of the Year and Kerry Group Irish Novel of the Year.

Her writing has aired on BBC Radio 3, BBC Radio 4 and RTE, and has been translated into twenty languages worldwide

Her work has appeared in journals such as Banshee, The Tangerine, Winter Papers and Harper’s Bazaar and on BBC Radio 3 and 4, and been translated into twenty languages worldwide.

In 2018 Jan was the Irish Writers Centre’s inaugural Roaming Writer in Residence on the trains of Ireland. She was the 2019 recipient of the Jack Harte Bursary and has completed residencies in Cove Park, Scotland, the James Merrill House, Stonington, Connecticut and the Centre Culturel Irlandais, Paris. Jan has curated the CS Lewis Festival, the Hillsborough Festival of Literature and Ideas and the inaugural Belfast Lit Crawl. She was part of an AHRC-funded research project at Queen’s University Belfast exploring the representation of Dementia in literature and also worked on the Bad Bridget project. She has facilitated creative writing workshops for QUB, Irish Writers Centre, Dublin, John Hewitt Summer School, West Cork Literary Festival, the Stinging Fly and many other universities, festivals and organisations worldwide.

Jan was the Seamus Heaney Centre Fellow at Queens University Belfast in 2025 and is a Fellow of the Royal Society of Literature. She has also achieved the rank of Chevalier in the Ordre des Arts et des Lettres in France.

Her first stage play, an adaptation of the children's classic The Velveteen Rabbit, was produced by Replay Theatre Company at the Lyric Theatre in Belfast in March 2025

She was elected a Fellow of the Royal Society of Literature in 2023.

Born in Ballymena in 1980, Carson lives in Belfast.

== Works ==
=== Novels ===
- Malcolm Orange Disappears (2014)
- The Fire Starters (2019)
- The Raptures (2022)
- Few and Far Between (2026)

=== Short Story Collections ===
- Children's Children (2016)
- The Last Resort (2021)
- Quickly, While They Still Have Horses (2024)

=== Micro-Fiction Collections ===
- Postcard Stories (2017)
- Postcard Stories 2 (2020)
- No Vacancy (2026)
