= Michael Collins (Irish author) =

Irish novelist and runner (born 1964)

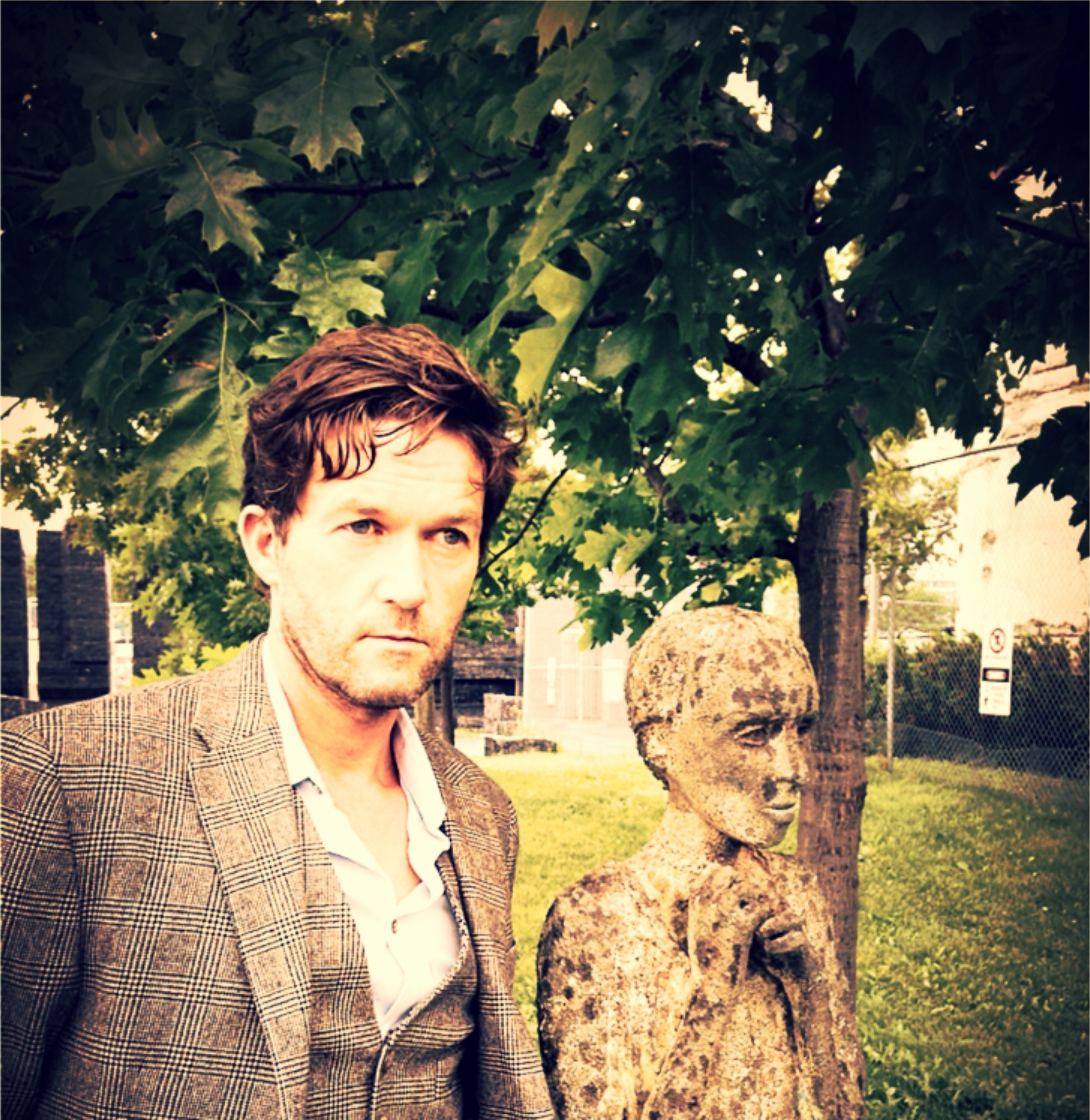
Michael Collins at Toronto's Ireland Park Famine Memorial

Michael Collins (born 4 June 1964) is an Irish novelist and international ultra-distance runner. His novel The Keepers of Truth was shortlisted for the 2000 Booker Prize. He has also won the Kerry Ingredients Irish Novel of the Year Award and the Lucien Barriere Literary Prize at the Deauville American Film Festival.

== Early life and education ==
Collins was born in Limerick. He earned an athletic scholarship to University of Notre Dame and received a master's degree from Oxford University. He has a doctorate from the University of Illinois Chicago.

== Athletics ==
A former member of the Irish National Team for the 100k distance (62.2 miles), Collins holds the Irish national masters record over the 100k distance. As captain of the Irish National Team in 2010, he won a bronze medal at the World 100k Championships held in Gibraltar. He has also won The 100-mile Himalayan Stage Race and The Mount Everest Challenge Marathon, along with The Last Marathon in Antarctica, and The North Pole Marathon.

== Works ==
- The Meat Eaters (short stories, also published as The Man who Dreamt of Lobsters), 1992
- The Life and Times of a Teaboy, 1993
- The Feminists Go Swimming, 1994, ISBN 9781897580080
- Emerald Underground, 1998
- The Keepers of Truth, 2000
- The Resurrectionists, 2003
- Lost Souls, 2004
- Death of a Writer (British title: The Secret Life of E. Robert Pendleton), 2006
- Midnight in a Perfect Life (British title), 2010
- The New Existence (British title: The Death of all Things Seen), 2016
