= The Green Road (Enright novel) =

2015 novel by Irish author Anne Enright

- First UK edition
- Author: Anne Enright
- Language: English
- Publisher: Jonathan Cape (UK); W. W. Norton Company (US); McClelland & Stewart (Canada)
- Publication date: 2015
- Publication place: Ireland
- Media type: Print (Hardcover & Paperback)
- Pages: pp 310
- ISBN: 9780393352801

The Green Road is a 2015 novel by Irish author Anne Enright. It is the sixth novel by Enright and concerns the lives of the Madigan family - four children and their mother Rosaleen. A critical success, it was called "virtuosic" by Telegraph critic Anthony Cummins.

== Plot summary ==
=== Part One: Leaving ===
The first half of the novel concerns each family member individually and goes chronologically from 1980 to 2005. Each of the four Madigan children and their mother Rosaleen receive a chapter of their own beginning with Hanna Madigan. Hanna's chapter is the only one that focuses on a family member as a child and deals with her relationship with her father. She is traumatised by viewing the culling of a chicken for dinner on her grandmother's farm. Dan Madigan's story jumps forward to 1991 during his time in New York with his fiancée as his repressed homosexuality comes to the fore during the AIDS epidemic. Constance Madigan's chapter is based in 1997 Limerick and focusses on the domestic roles of mother and wife. Constance must balance the concerns of her health that make her face her own mortality. Emmet's chapter takes place in Mali in 2002 as he works with impoverished children and is haunted by previous relief work he has been involved with. His relationship with a woman named Alice slowly unravels and deteriorates. Rosaleen ends the first half of the novel with a rumination on her life and her future as an older woman. She decides to sell the house and writes to all her children accordingly to gather together for Christmas for one last year at the old family home.

=== Part Two: Coming Home ===
The second half of the novel concerns the family members coming home and for some of them meeting each other as new people. Coming Home begins by succinctly placing the Madigan children as they get ready to return and the hustle and bustle of Christmas travel. The novel humorously covers the chaos of Christmas shopping last minute and the vanity of Celtic Tiger Ireland. The Green Road culminates upon a scene of gothic imagery as Rosaleen goes missing on Christmas Night. A search party is called and struggles to find her before eventually securing her late into a particularly bad winter night. A few short chapters tie up everything ending with Rosaleen having run away yet again having arrived at Emmet's doorstep in Dublin. She claims to have been kicked out but a phone call reveals that Constance is sick again, and that Rosaleen flew away rather than deal with the reality of the situation.

== Critical reception ==
Upon release The Green Road received warm praise from the literary press including Belinda McKeon of The Irish Times who praised the novel as "unnervingly knowing prose".

Nicholas Lezard of The Guardian positively stated that "the writing at the level of the sentence is so sharp and good. It is not so much that it alerts you to its own brilliance, but that it captures, as lightly and deftly as you could wish, the internal cadences of the person being written about."

Anthony Cummins, writing in The Telegraph, had praise for the novel, “virtuosic but inconsequential”, adding that it “in its loose ends is a bold and brilliant way to approach the sadness of a family that fails to connect.”

== Accolades and nominations ==
The Green Road was nominated for The 2016 Baileys Women's Prize for Fiction, longlisted for the 2015 Man Booker Prize, and shortlisted for the 2017 International Dublin Literary Award. Enright won the Kerry Group Irish Fiction Award for 2016.
