= Night in Tunisia (short story collection) =

1976 first book by Irish writer Neil Jordan

- First edition
- Author: Neil Jordan
- Cover artist: Bill Hastings (photo); Larry Bennett (design)
- Language: English
- Publisher: Co-op Books (Dublin)
- Publication date: 1976
- Publication place: Ireland
- Media type: Print
- Pages: 124
- Awards: Guardian Fiction Prize in 1979

Night in Tunisia (1976) is the first book by Irish writer Neil Jordan. This collection of ten short stories was published by The Irish Writers Co-operative (Co-op Books) in Dublin, Ireland. The story's title is a jazz standard composed by Dizzy Gillespie. In 1979, the book won the Guardian Fiction Prize. It was then published by Writers and Readers in the UK and by George Braziller in the US.

== Stories ==
- "Last Orders" - In Kensal Rise a young hod carrier from Dublin commits suicide by slashing his wrists in the local Victorian bath house surrounded by other navvies.
- "Seduction" - Every August the narrator meets his friend Jamie in an Irish seaside resort where they talk about girls, as their sexuality reveals itself.
- "Sand" - A boy is offered a half-an hour ride on a tinker's donkey on a beach in exchange for the tinker's 'go' on his nearby sister Jean. He accepts but doesn't realise what the tinker really meant by 'go' until he hears his sister's screams.
- "Mr Solomon Wept" - He runs an amusement arcade in Laytown in County Meath where his wife left him a year ago on the anniversary of the Laytown Races. He now realises the depth of his love for her.
- "Night in Tunisia" - The narrator's father plays jazz on the tenor saxophone at Butlins and pays his son to learn to play the alto saxophone. The narrator is more fascinated by the changes of his sister's body and by that of a local tennis-playing woman wearing a yellow cardigan...
- "Skin" - An Irish housewife in Dublin had prepared dinner and reads about a 'Swedish Housewive's Afternoon of Sin'. She drives to Howth and paddles in the sea, where she notices a man watching her.
- "Her Soul" - A drunk woman looks at the shadows. She meets a man on the stairs at a party and has a drink with him.
- "Outpatient" - A young wife returns from a Catholic retreat to her husband; together they plan to move to house near Portmarnock.
- "Tree" - John cannot drive or step out of a car; the narrator believes she sees a whitethorn tree, but John tells her that it can't be a whitethorn. Later, as they leave a pub, they have a row and she walks away from the car. She sees another whitethorn with rags tied to the branches and faded pictures nailed to the trunk, with pleas written on them.
- "A Love" - During the funeral procession of Éamon de Valera in Dublin a young man meets his old girlfriend and talks about their early relationship.

== Reception ==
From Scribd the book is praised:

- "His fiction is poetic in the best sense of the word, which is to say that he manipulates certain images skillfully without using more words than necessary. This is an exciting book by the kind of writer who makes you curious about what he'll do next." - Washington Post
- "Night in Tunisia is my book of the year...Jordan's precise control of tone, style and narrative deserves comparison with other Irish masters of the short story form - O'Connor, O'Faolain, and Joyce. Here's to the Jordan to come." - Time Out
- "Bristling with talent and promise." - Irish Times
