= Angel (1982 Irish film) =

- DVD cover
- Directed by: Neil Jordan
- Written by: Neil Jordan
- Produced by: John Boorman
- Starring: Veronica Quilligan; Stephen Rea; Alan Devlin
- Cinematography: Chris Menges
- Edited by: J. Patrick Duffner
- Music by: Paddy Meegan
- Production companies: Bórd Scánnon na hEireaan; Channel Four Films; Motion Picture Company of Ireland
- Distributed by: British Film Institute
- Release dates: 14 May 1982 (Ireland); 18 May 1984 (U.S.)
- Running time: 92 minutes
- Country: Ireland
- Language: English
- Budget: £490,000 Irish punts

Angel (U.S. title: Danny Boy) is a 1982 Irish film written and directed by Neil Jordan and starring Stephen Rea. The film was Neil Jordan's directorial debut, and the executive producer was John Boorman.

== Premise ==
Danny, a jazz saxophonist with a travelling band, witnesses the gangland murder of the band's manager (involved in extortion payoffs) and that of a deaf and mute girl witness at a dancehall in South Armagh. Danny tries to hunt down the murderers and in doing so his relationship with Deirdre, the singer in his band, falls apart and he becomes a murderer himself.

== Cast ==
- Stephen Rea as Danny
- Veronica Quilligan as Annie
- Honor Heffernan as Deirdre
- Alan Devlin as Bill
- Peter Caffrey as Ray
- Gerard McSorley as Assistant
- Ray McAnally as Bloom
- Anthony Tyler Quin as Tony Quinn

== Production ==
The film is set in Northern Ireland and it is implied that the extortionists/murderers are loyalist paramilitaries (one is described as "a Prod" by his Catholic girlfriend; another is a policeman). However, there is little specific reference to the Northern Ireland Troubles.

The film was made in and around inner-city Dublin (standing in for Belfast) and Jordan's native Bray. In the sequences where the band play in a seaside resort (probably supposed to be Portstewart, since Danny is shown asking older bandsmen about their memories of his late uncle, whom we are earlier told played in a band at Portstewart) Bray Head is visible in some background shots. Other locations include the former Butlin's holiday camp in Mosney, County Meath, and the former St. Brendans Hospital, Grangegorman.

The dance and crowd scenes from the Mosney ballroom had to be re-shot due to a problem with the film processing.

== Reception ==
In 1982 it was reported the film was "doing very well in Dublin though not so well in the country."
