= Mr. Pip =

2012 film directed by Andrew Adamson

- Theatrical release poster
- Directed by: Andrew Adamson
- Written by: Andrew Adamson
- Based on: Mister Pip by Lloyd Jones
- Produced by: Andrew Adamson; Robin Scholes; Leslie Urdang; Dean Vanech
- Starring: Hugh Laurie; Xzannjah; Healesville Joel; Eka Darville; Kerry Fox
- Cinematography: John Toon
- Edited by: Sim Evan-Jones
- Music by: Tim Finn; Harry Gregson-Williams
- Production companies: Olympus Pictures; New Zealand Film Commission; Daydream Productions; NZ On Air; Eyeworks Pictures
- Distributed by: Paramount Pictures; Transmission Films (Australia and New Zealand)
- Release dates: 9 September 2012 (Toronto International Film Festival); 3 October 2013 (New Zealand)
- Running time: 115 minutes
- Countries: Papua New Guinea; Australia; New Zealand
- Languages: English; Tok Pisin
- Box office: $977,855

Mr. Pip is a 2012 drama film written and directed by Andrew Adamson and based on Lloyd Jones' novel Mister Pip. Hugh Laurie played Mr. Watts.

== Plot ==
In 1989, as the Bougainville Civil War rages on in Papua New Guinea, Mr. Watts, the only white man left on the island after a blockade, re-opens the local school. He begins reading the Charles Dickens novel Great Expectations, which transfixes a young girl named Matilda. She finds comfort in the story of a Victorian orphan, Pip, when her own world is falling apart.

Matilda writes "Pip" in the sand, and this simple act leads to terrible consequences when the "Redskins", an army sent to destroy the local rebels, suspect Pip to be a rebel leader and demand he be brought before them. They do not believe Mr Watts when he tells them Pip is a made up story character from a book. They tell Matilda to find this book, if it is real, but Matilda cannot find the book and the Redskins burn everyone's furniture, as a punishment. They say next time, Pip had better be handed over or else. Later, Matilda finds the book wrapped up in a mat at home, and realised her disapproving mother, Dolores, hid it there. She is resentful and angry, even more so when Dolores and the other women burn all of Mr Watts' furniture too, along with the book, which Matilda placed in Mr Watts' desk drawer.

Mr Watts' wife Grace dies, and the women of the village realise they must stand through this together. Dolores and Matilda make up, and it seems all is well again. A while later, the Redskins appear again, demanding to be shown Pip or lives will be at stake. Mr Watts decides to sacrifice himself, pretending to be Pip. He is shot and fed to the pigs, as is another woman, her son, and Dolores, for speaking up.

After the Redskins have gone, the women and children mourn their friends' deaths. Matilda nearly drowns after she is pulled under by a strong current in the river, but is saved by some of the men and women in a boat. The island is no longer safe, and Matilda is forced to go to Australia, where her father migrated. A few years later, she is told Mr Watts left a will, and left most of his possessions for Matilda, including a flat which is occupied by his ex-wife. Matilda visits the flat and meets Mrs Watts, but decides to let her keep the flat after she finds the writing on the walls which Mr Watts told his class about.

Matilda visits the Charles Dickens museum and reconciles with her imaginary version of Pip, and cries, letting out all her emotion about the previous events. She later returns to the now peaceful island with her father and becomes a teacher.

== Cast ==
- Hugh Laurie as Tom Watts
- Xzannjah Matsi as Matilda Naimo
- Healesville Joel as Dolores Naimo
- Eka Darville as Pip
- TaPiwa Soropa as Startop
- Kerry Fox as June Watts
- Florence Korokoro as Grace Watts
- David Kaumara as the Redskins lead officer
- Kausibona Mel as Daniel
- Sam Simiha as Sam
- Marcellin Ampa'oi as Joseph Naimo
- Nathaniel Lees as Mr. Jaggers

== Production ==
Mr. Pip was filmed in Bougainville, Papua New Guinea, and in New Zealand: on 29 and 30 July 2011 it was filmed at Glendowie College, and at a flight training centre at Albert Street, Auckland; the historic precinct of Oamaru represented Dickens' London, Richard Pearse Airport at Timaru represented the Mount Isa Airport at Queensland, and Kingsland Railway Station in Auckland represented Gravesend Station in England.

Post-production started in November–December 2011 at Park Road Post in Wellington, New Zealand, ready for release in 2012. The film premiered at the Toronto International Film Festival in September 2012. The trailer was released in April 2013, and the film opened in cinemas on 3 October.

== Reception ==
The film received mixed reviews. On the review aggregator website Rotten Tomatoes, 47% of 17 critics' reviews are positive, with an average rating of 6.1/10.

Dennis Harvey of Variety said that the film "Like fellow Kiwi Peter Jackson, Andrew Adamson has followed a run of large-scale fantasy entertainments (two "Shreks", two "Narnias") by adapting an inspirational-uplift literary novel". Harvey also wrote "This gimmicky story set during Papua New Guinea's civil war reaches for emotional effect in a fatally hamfisted fashion".

By contrast, The New Zealand Herald gave the film 4 out of 5 stars, saying "it's a joy". The review applauded Laurie's portrayal of Mr Watts and notes that "the film belongs to Xzannjah, whose radiant yet unshowy performance nails Matilda dead centre and pulls off the tricky double act of being our eyes on the action and its central character". The review's verdict is "Smart and cinematically adventurous".
