= Wide Open Spaces =

Wide Open Spaces may refer to:

- Wide Open Spaces (album), a 1998 album by the Chicks
  - "Wide Open Spaces" (song), a song from the Chicks album
- Wide Open Spaces (1924 film), starring Stan Laurel
- Wide Open Spaces (1947 film), starring Donald Duck
- Wide Open Spaces, an outdoors website published by Publishers Clearing House

== See also ==
- "Wide Open Space", a 1996 song by UK band Mansun
- Wide Open Space (festival) in the Australian Northern Territory
