= Indra Sinha =

British writer (born 1950)

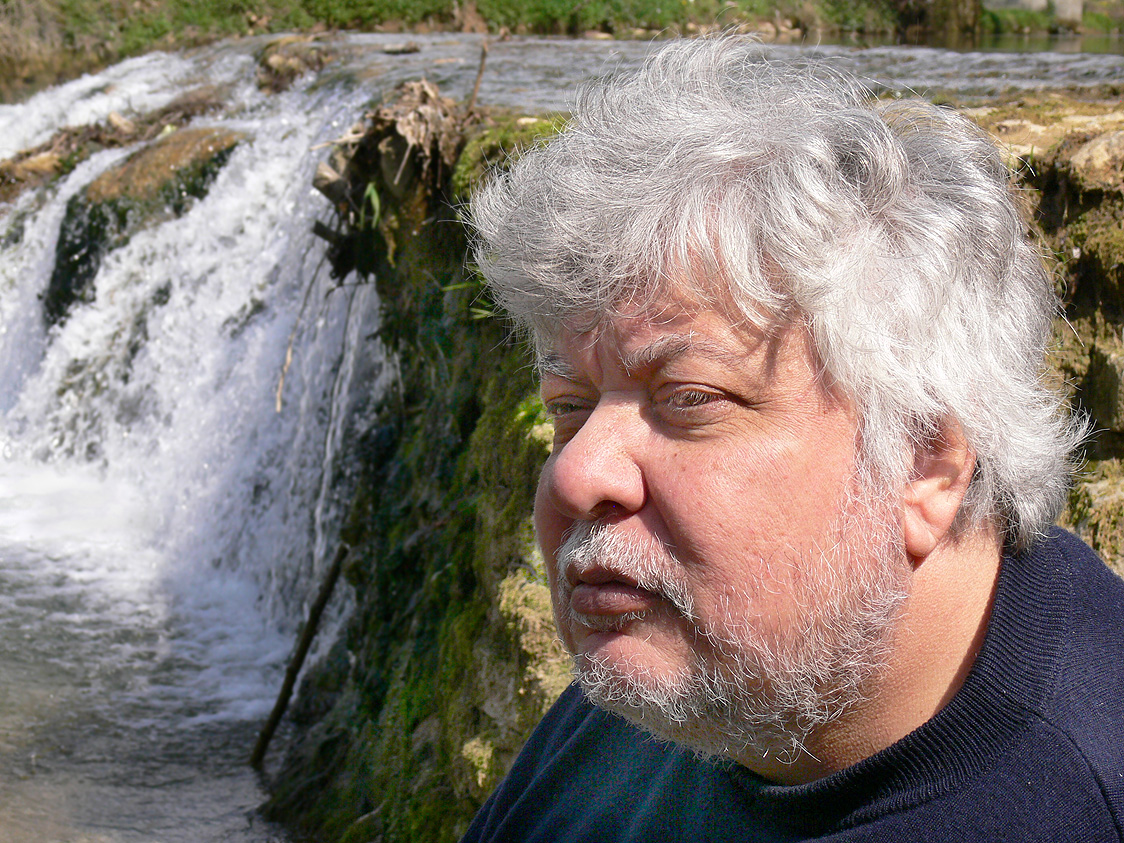
Indra Sinha in his garden in France, March 2007

Indra Sinha (born 1950 in Colaba, Mumbai, Maharashtra, India) is a British writer of Indian and English descent. Animal's People, his most recent novel, was shortlisted for the 2007 Man Booker Prize and winner of the 2008 Commonwealth Writers' Prize for Europe and South Asia.

In July 2015, Sinha was awarded an honorary Doctorate in Literature by the University of Brighton for "his major contribution to literature and demonstrating the power of words in changing people’s lives".

== Biography ==
Sinha is the son of an officer in the Indian Navy and an English writer. He was educated at Mayo College, Ajmer, Rajasthan in India; Oakham School, Rutland, England and Pembroke College, Cambridge in England, where he studied English literature. His wife and he live in the Lot valley in south-west France. They have three grown-up children.

Formerly a copywriter for Ogilvy & Mather, London, and, from 1984, Collett Dickenson Pearce & Partners, Sinha has the distinction of having been voted one of the top ten British copywriters of all time. He became known for hard-hitting, campaigning advertising for charities such as Amnesty International and the Bhopal Medical Appeal, but became increasingly disenchanted with commercial advertising. In 1995, Sinha resigned from the agency to concentrate on writing.

== Books ==
Animal's People, set in the fictional Indian city of Khaufpur, was a reworking of the Bhopal disaster based on Sinha's long association working with the Bhopal survivors. His earlier works include translations of ancient Sanskrit texts into English, a non-fiction memoir of the pre-internet generation (The Cybergypsies), and a novel, The Death of Mr. Love, based on the case of K. M. Nanavati vs. State of Maharashtra.

"I was invited by a publisher to write the text for Tantra. Having done some research, what fascinated me was the evidence that many 'tantric' ideas actually came to India from the Mediterranean. It is rather a dry read and debunks reports of orgies and sexual mischief – sorry to disappoint."

— Indra Sinha, Interview.

=== Bibliography ===
- 1980. The Love Teachings of Kama Sutra: With extracts from Koka Shastra, Ananga Ranga and other famous Indian works on love. Translations from Sanskrit and commentary. London: Hamlyn. Hardcover first edition: ISBN 0-600-34158-5. First North American edition 1997, New York: Marlowe & Co. Paperback: ISBN 1-56924-779-X.
- 1993. Tantra: The Search for Ecstasy (also known with the subtitle "The Cult of Ecstasy"). London: Hamlyn. ISBN 0-600-57699-X.
- 1993. The Great Book of Tantra: Translations and Images from the Classic Indian Text. Rochester: Inner Traditions - Bear & Company. ISBN 0-89281-487-X. London: Hamlyn paperback edition: ISBN 0-600-59998-1.
- 1999. The Cybergypsies: a True Tale of Lust, War, and Betrayal on the Electronic Frontier. New York: Viking Press, hardcover first edition. ISBN 0-670-88630-0. New York: Simon & Schuster paperback edition: ISBN 0-684-81929-5.
- 2002. The Death of Mr Love. New York: Scribner (Simon & Schuster). ISBN 0-7432-0698-3. (See also: K. M. Nanavati vs. State of Maharashtra.)
- 2007. Animal's People. New York: Simon & Schuster. ISBN 0-7432-5920-3. (See also: Bhopal disaster.)

== Bhopal ==
Sinha has been a passionate campaigner for justice for the victims of the Bhopal disaster since 1993, when he created the first advertisement for the Bhopal Medical Appeal (using the now-famous photograph by Raghu Rai of a dead child being buried) that raised money to build a clinic to provide free treatment for the survivors. He is an outspoken critic of Dow Chemical Company, the multinational owner of Union Carbide, whose neglected, dilapidated and undermanned chemical plant in the city of Bhopal leaked 27 tonnes of poisonous gas on the night of 3 December 1984, killing up to 8,000 people and injuring upwards of half a million. Around 22,000 people have died as a result of injuries sustained on "that night", and more than 100,000 remain chronically ill; the abandoned, derelict factory continues to leach toxic chemicals into the groundwater, poisoning wells.

Apart from his novel, Animal's People (a fictionalised account of the aftermath of the disaster), Sinha has given many interviews and written several articles on the subject, including one in The Guardian marking the 25th anniversary of the disaster, in which he roundly condemns local politicians (particularly Babulal Gaur of the BJP) for their failure to comply with a 2004 Supreme Court ruling ordering them to supply clean water to the poison victims. Nor does he absolve the Indian Government of blame.

"Dow has been trying to twist the arm of Manmohan Singh's Congress government into letting it off the Bhopal hook in return for a billion-dollar investment in India." "When people ask, 'Why is the disaster continuing? Why has the factory not been cleaned? Why have Union Carbide and Dow not faced justice?', the answer is this: Union Carbide's victims are still dying in Bhopal because India itself is dying under the corrupt and self-serving rule of rotten leaders."

— Indra Sinha, 'Bhopal: 25 years of poison', The Guardian, 3 December 2009

As a former advertising copywriter, Sinha is particularly scathing about Dow Chemical Company's attempts to improve its image through its sponsorship of events such as the Blue Planet Run and Live Earth Run For Water. He has called Dow's "Human Element" advertising campaign "glossy falsehoods", and quotes artist Paul Phare (who created a set of e-cards in response to Dow) "Telling a lie beautifully does not make it true".

== See also ==
- List of Indian writers
