= Shade (novel) =

2005 novel by Irish writer Neil Jordan

- First edition (publ. John Murray)
- Author: Neil Jordan
- Language: English
- Publication date: 2004

Shade is a novel published in 2004 by the Irish novelist and film writer Neil Jordan.

The book begins in the 1950s with the brutal murder of the central protagonist, Nina Hardy, at the hands of a mentally and physically scarred veteran of the First World War. What follows is an explanation of the motivation leading to the murder, of her childhood, her parents' lives, the brutality of war and the aftermath of her demise. The novel's narrative jumps between times and between narrators cohesively.

The title itself comes from the shade (or ghost) of Nina Hardy which, travelling through time, is able to review but not change the events leading to its loss of corporeality. Along with accounts of analogous occurrences that foreshadow Nina's brutal end, the impotence of her ghost to actually alter its fate lends a poignant air of inevitability to the entire story. The book is strongly descriptive, especially visually, and deals with emotional issues with plenty of narrative tricks and a strong literary style.
