= Animal's People =

2007 novel by Indra Sinha

- Author: Indra Sinha
- Language: English
- Publisher: Simon & Schuster
- Publication date: 2007 (1st edition)
- Publication place: Great Britain
- Media type: Print (Hardback & Paperback)
- Pages: 374 (paperback, 1st edition)
- ISBN: 978-0-7432-5920-0 (paperback, 1st edition)

Animal's People is a novel by Indra Sinha. It was shortlisted for the 2007 Man Booker Prize and is the Winner of the 2008 Commonwealth Writers' Prize: Best Book From Europe & South Asia. Sinha's narrator is a 19-year-old orphan of Khaufpur, born a few days before the 1984 Bhopal disaster, whose spine has become so twisted that he must walk on all fours. Ever since he can remember, he has gone on all fours. Known to everyone simply as Animal, he rejects sympathy, spouts profanity and obsesses about sex. He lives with a crazy old French nun called Ma Franci, and his dog Jara. Also, he falls in love with a local musician's daughter, Nisha.

The story was recorded in Hindi on a series of tapes by Animal (the main protagonist) himself and it has been translated to English as well. The author uses Animal's odd mixture of Hindi, French and Indianised English such as "kampani" (company), "jarnalis" (journalist) and "jamisponding" (spying, like James Bond).

== Title ==
The title Animal’s People offers interesting insight into the novel, as it gives us a view of the way the people of Khaufpur identified themselves. The chorus of the children copying Elli, after stating she does not understand Animal's People, shows this unification of the people of Khaufpur. "We can hear the chorus of small voices gradually falling behind, ‘Hey Animal’s People!’" Unification of people usually takes place during a disaster, which occurs during and after the crisis in Khaufpur. The title of the novel is used to help identify this unification of people and also to foreshadow the difficulty Elli will face when trying to open the clinic. Elli will have to try to break down the tough barriers which exist in Khaufpur, to help the people move past what they fear the most, change. The comfort they seek is always being able to blame the kampani for what happened to them, and assuming every outsider is there because the kampani sent them. The relation to the title is that Animal is a prime example of the hatred, with his foul mouth and negative attitude towards everything.

The title "Animal’s People" also refers to the difference in behaviors and attitudes between the citizens of Kaufpur and the American doctor, Elli. This becomes apparent on page 183 when Elli is frustrated about everyone's attitude toward her clinic, and yells "HEY ANIMAL’S PEOPLE! I DON’T [...] UNDERSTAND YOU!" She came to Kaufpur with only a mere idea of how the people had suffered. She knew that people were ill and her duty would be to nourish them back to health, but that was the extent of her connection to them. Due to her more fortunate circumstances, she could never fully grasp the trauma and the aftermath of the gas leak or the chronic poverty which plagued the city. Furthermore, she was oblivious to the reasons why the citizens were so untrustworthy toward outsiders. Without experiencing it for herself, Elli the doctress was an outcast among the rest of the city of Kaufpur—Animal's People.

== Major characters ==
Animal

Animal is the protagonist of this story. He is a victim of a chemical factory explosion caused by Kampani and is depicted as a boy with a twisted spine that roams around Khaufpur on both of his hands and feet like a dog. He constantly denies his humanity and claims that he is an animal. After this factory incident, Animal is put in an orphanage and taken care of by Ma Franci. He has no recollection of his parents. Animal openly displays his hatred toward humans yet there is a side of him that yearns to be a human being. Therefore, when an American doctor comes to Khaufpur, he regains his lost hope of being able to stand on his own two feet and dreams for that day to come. Although Animal initially loathes his inability to walk on two feet, in the end, he realizes that being a four-foot is better off for him. By being a four-foot, Animal avoids being one of the millions of upright humans and instead becomes the one and only Animal.

Somraj

Pandit Somraj Tryambak Punekar is Nisha's father and a music teacher. He is described as tall, with a long and pointy nose, and long fingers. He also has a stoic nature, being called solemn and private by Animal. The most important fact about Somraj is that he used to be a famous singer, known throughout India, who was referred to as the Voice of Khaufpur. However the night of the accident he lost his wife and baby son, in addition to his lungs being damaged by the chemicals. He no longer sings, and if he tries he has coughing fits.

Ma Françi

Ma Françi is a nun from France who worked in the orphanage where Animal grew up. She acts as Animal's mother figure and can be described as kind, although mildly senile. Her affliction from the accident is her loss of understanding Hindi and English. She believes that everyone else is speaking gibberish and is unable to understand that they are using another language, not just making random sounds. She also sees prophetic angels as a result of her madness. However, she still does her duties of going from house to house, helping the sick and injured as best she can.

Zafar

Zafar is Nisha's boyfriend. He is described as a man in his late thirties, tall, good-looking, thin with a jutting beard, curly black hair and glasses which makes him appear wise. Zafar is an outsider who is so appalled by the Kampani actions that he moves to Khaufpur to advocate on their behalf. He sacrifices everything in his life, including his studies as a scholar for the poor and sick. He is a saint and hero to the citizens of Khaufpur.

Farouq

Farouq is Animal's friend and nemesis. Farouq's family came to Khaufpur from Yar-yilaqis. His intelligence is that of a criminal in a gang, like his two brothers, or a mechanic. He is Muslim, a movie expert, and Zafar's number two man.

Nisha

Daughter of Somraj, girlfriend of Zafar, friend of Animal. Nisha sees Animal in the gutter and introduces him to Zafar. She is the object of his affection, yet sees him as a friend only.

Elli

American doctor who comes to Khaupfur. She is frequently described as wearing blue jeans and is an object of lust for Animal and others in the town. Acting out of philanthropy, she struggles to find acceptance.

== Major themes ==
=== Westernization ===
Westernization plays a key role throughout the novel: setting up key relations between characters, showing Sinha's view on western influence, and giving a more accurate depiction of "distant sufferers." This book is about a chemical disaster—caused by an American company—on Indian soil. Furthering this point Sinha shows a complete refusal by the same company to accept any repercussions for their actions. The various examples of apprehension towards outsiders (the journalist (Jarnaliss), the leaders of the company (Kampani), and Elli the doctress) give insight into preexisting blame-based relationships. These outsiders, associated with the company that neglected responsibility for making the people ill, are seen as tools to help mask and minimize the harm to Khaufpur. Western materialism is objectified through Animal's eyes, with images like the Coca-Cola sign that is so commercialized that it transcends language barriers. Sinha alters facts from the real Bhopal disaster including the name of the city, the company responsible, and names of individuals involved in the relief effort. This shows how he wished to make this story applicable to all western caused debacles.

=== Identity ===
At the conclusion of Animal’s People, Animal finally accepts who he is—Animal. We see this concept of self-acceptance as a major theme in this novel, as we see Animal transform through the sharing of his story. Throughout the novel, Animal struggles internally with who he is, especially with his appearance as an animal rather than a human. However, after coming to terms with what has happened and the suffering he experienced as a consequence, Animal accepts who that has allowed him to become—a person whose identity does not come from the events of the Kampani disaster, but rather a person whose identity comes from personal experiences and the people who surround him in his life. We know Animal has truly come to accept his new identity when he decisively says, "Stay four-foot, I’m the one and only Animal."

=== Love ===
Love is seen in different forms throughout the novel. Perhaps the simplest form of love presented is the mother-son relationship between Animal and Ma Françi. While Animal spends much of his day away from his senile "mother," he always makes a point to check in, especially when chaos breaks out in Khaufpur. Animal's desire for physical love is very apparent starting from the beginning of the novel. Animal speaks using vulgar language and crude humor and is often very blunt in what he wants, especially in front of the women he desires. Animal's physical love for Nisha can be recognized early in the novel, particularly when he expresses extreme jealously towards her boyfriend, Zafar. As the novel progresses, Animal's love for Nisha noticeably changes into a more compassionate type of love – a love that allows the reader to understand that Animal has come to consider Nisha as family.

== Narrative structure ==
The novel is told through Animal's tape recordings. The Kakadu Jarnalis insists Animal tell his story. The tapes are recorded in Hindi by Animal and then translated into English by the journalist. Like with previous foreign journalists, Animal thinks that his story will be entangled with everyone else's in Khaufpur; the stories of all survivors will be meshed together to form one tragic tale. To ensure this will not happen, Animal agrees to tell his story if only it will be told exactly how it is presented through his tapes.

In Animal's second tape, he dwells on the audience and directly addresses the audience. In a letter to Animal, Jarnalis states "Animal, you must imagine that you are talking to just one person. Slowly that person will come to seem real to you. Imagine them to be a friend. You must trust them and open your heart to them, that person will not judge you badly whatever you say." Animal then talks to the reader and says "You are reading my words, you are that person. I’ve no name for you so I will call you Eyes."

Indra Sinha begins Animal’s People with the editor's note: "This story was recorded in Hindi on a series of tapes by a nineteen-year-old boy in the Indian city of Khaufpur. True to the agreement between the boy and the journalist who befriended him, the story is told entirely in the boy’s words as recorded on the tapes." Although this premise is entirely fictional, Sinha wanted to convey the story in a way that gave authority and a singular voice to the real, but little known aftermath of a gas leak in India that is considered the world's worst industrial disaster, the Bhopali disaster. The "recorded tapes" are arranged in a largely linear manner that is interrupted with flashbacks that skip between the past and present. They impart the story gradually, developing the setting and characters of Animal's past while simultaneously incorporating ongoing events. Animal tells his story in the past-tense, as he is repeating experiences to Jarnalis via the tapes. The first and second tapes introduce Animal as the narrator and establish the audience as nothing more than disembodied "eyes." In the middle of the second tape, Animal jumps back to when he was six years old and the pains of his apparent morph from "human to animal" that occurred as his spine twisted to the point where he had to walk on all fours. He then quickly fast-forwards in tape three to the meeting of present characters: Nisha and Zafar, then interjects a narration that describes the current appearance of the Kampani's factory. The story continues in this flitting manner to uncover the full depth of the situation through Animal's unexpectedly fierce and spirited narration, giving an unconventional take on the idea of "distant sufferers."

== Style ==
Animal’s People is primarily a first-person monologue in which the narrator (Animal) details past events of his life and his internal thoughts from that time to an audience whose existence he is aware of. On occasion the novel changes to a third-person narrative where Animal narrates another character's independent experiences, such as Elli's interactions with her ex-husband in Tape Twenty. In both cases, the story, though it occurred in the past, is presented in the present tense. Despite the fact that the novel details past events, Animal is not presented as an omniscient narrator—the reader is never informed beyond Animal himself (the character rather than the narrator) in the context of the story. This, in addition to Sinha's use of present tense to describe past events causes the reader to experience Animal's life (in the form of direct speech) alongside him while still allowing for commentary from a narrator who has already lived through these experiences (usually in the form of indirect speech). Thus, the reader is caused to identify more strongly with Animal's own thoughts, emotions, and desires as the story unfolds—something that falls in line with Indra Sinha's past career writing emotionally charged advertisements for charities such as Amnesty International.

Influence of perspective

The story told by Indra Sinha in Animal’s People is one that is obviously influenced by the Bhopal disaster from 1984, and the way Sinha wants the world to see the disaster. Sinha chose to write the story in a fictionalized setting so he could write "freely", as opposed to the situation he already knew regarding Bhopal. However, his goal was to instead tell the aftermath of the disaster which he does through the lens of Animal. In Animal, the perspective of Sinha and many others still seeking reparations from the incident are channeled and reflected.

Khaufpuri language

Indra Sinha's inclusion of words such as kampani and Khaufpur—"kauf" meaning "terror" in Urdu —challenges readers' competency as linguists. Animal's language (Khaufpuri) requires readers to recognize phonetic similarities to English and etymological cues (e.g. Hindi, French) in order to ascribe meaning to the text. The inclusion of a Khaufpuri Glossary in Animal's People substantiates the cultural richness of Animal and the Khaufpuri people while successfully reminding the reader of the "otherness" of Animal. Sinha's melding of linguistic traditions enhances the meaning of the text and artistic freedom of the author.

== Historical references ==
=== Appearance ===
Animal's People's description of the Kampani disaster site is accurate to Union Carbide’s actual abandoned factory. The novel depicts the factory as untouched and overgrown. So many years after the Bhopal Disaster, the Kampani company has not returned to the scene and cleaned up the mess. Animal mentions the steps leading nowhere, and the abandoned tanks —cracked and still containing toxic chemicals. Trees and other vegetation have taken over the area, making it difficult to access and travel within.

Indra Sinha's description is similar to the real factory in Bhopal, India. In 1996, tests were administered on the soil and water testing for toxic chemicals. Results came back positive—water is still being contaminated. Through observation of pictures, tanks are left untouched, stairs leading to nothing substantial, rust covering everything, and trees and wild grass everywhere. Indra Sinha's Kampani in Animal’s People has many similarities to the Union Carbide factory in Bhopal.

=== Correspondence ===
Animal's People takes place in the town Khaufpur and is based on Bhopal, India. It is the site of one of the world's worst industrial accidents. The first instance of court being brought up in the novel references a trial that is said to take place 18 years after the initial disaster. Zafar tells how the Kampani refuses to recognize the court's decision to proceed with criminal charges against American executives in India. Finally at the end of this first court date, they are able to get the court to review the assets of the Kampani in an effort to bring the people responsible to justice. The court case depicted in the novel is rooted in the reality of the criminal cases surrounding the Bhopal disaster. The Indian Supreme Court was quick to bring criminal charges against the CEO of Union Carbide, Warren Anderson.

Following the disaster, Anderson traveled to India and was immediately placed under house arrest upon arrival. He left the country never to return. As part of a 470 million dollar settlement reached in 1989, the criminal charges in the case were dismissed. Through petitions and protests, activists were able to restore the criminal charges against Anderson and four other Union Carbide employees in 1991. Despite this decision by Indian courts, warrants being issued, and requests for extradition, the CEO refused to appear in Indian court. Numerous trials were held that Union Carbide officials never acknowledged. In June 2012, a U.S. Court ruled that neither Union Carbide nor their former CEO were liable for any of the charges brought against them. Dow Chemical, which bought Union Carbide, has repeatedly denied responsibility for the disaster or its repercussions, but in July 2013 Indian courts decided that Dow Chemical is still responsible to survivors of the almost three decades old disaster. It is thought that 100,000 people are still suffering from the 1984 gas leak.

=== Outside intervention ===
The Sambhavna Trust is an organization that was founded to bring aid to the victims of the Bhopal Disaster. It set up various clinics throughout the affected area, none of which charged any fees for treatment. Each clinic was allopathic and served as a one-stop spot for treatment. In Animal’s People, this was personified through Ellie. She was able to provide medical aid to people who came to her, and also placed focus on their mental health and well-being by befriending all her patients and counseling them on a more personal level so they could finally accept and understand their disorders.

The Sambhavna Trust also emphasized mental health and recovery by providing yoga and massage sessions through its Ayurveda Care department. This type of treatment is native to India and specific to the Hindu culture. Ellie made sure to medicate the whole person, not just their physical ailments. She befriended Animal and helped him through his internal struggle about the orientation of his body. At the end of the novel, Animal is very accepting of his new form and it is all from Ellie and her unconditional support.

The Sambhavna Trust did not come about until 1996, and the gas leak occurred in 1984. In those 12 years, the victims received care in hospital-based facilities, which were too expensive for a lot of those people. Even though the Indian government eventually decided to give free healthcare to the victims, their children were not covered, even though their health was also compromised. The majority of the outsiders’ focus was going towards either research or compensation and recognition for the survivors, not their health. Because of this, nobody was sure how to react to the Sambhavna Trust clinics, and whether they were actually there to help. In the book, Ellie was the first one to come in to help the victims. They were very wary of her at first, thinking that she was gathering statistics for Kampani's research, since that is what they were used beforehand. Once her intentions were regarded as pure and earned the people's trust, they were more than willing to receive her help.

== Reception ==
According to The Bookbag, Sinha's book was shortlisted for the 2007 Man Booker prize, described in the Independent as an extraordinary achievement and by the Indian Express as a novel so honest it leaves you gasping for breath. Lesley Mason said in his review of Animal's People, "This is a book that should be part of the national curriculum through-out the world. Not only does it explore the outfall of one particular humanitarian and ecological disaster and the pitiful response to it by those responsible; but takes in the wider picture of the general attitude of richer people to the poorer and that of the so-called developed nations to those who have yet to claim a share of the power and the glory (or the muck and the money)."

New York Times

"It (Khaufpur) is also the setting for his fiercely polemical — and unexpectedly bawdy — novel Animal’s People, a finalist for the 2007 Man Booker Prize that reveals not a paradise but a blighted city."

Blog Critics

"Try to imagine for a moment what it must be like to be the people of Bhopal who have lived for twenty plus years watching family and friends die, descend into madness or give birth to stillborn babies. Animal's People, the latest offering from Indian author Indra Sinha available from Simon & Schuster Canada, does just that."

Washington Post

Washington Post said of Animal's People, "The right writer has met the right tragedy".

Barnes and Noble

Eric Banks of Barnes and Noble Review said, "It isn't hard to figure why it hooked critics: Sinha controls language so magnificently in this novel... [he] carves out his territory with a vengeance".
