= Wideopen Islands =

Group of islands in Antarctica

- Location within Antarctic Peninsula
- Etymology: Reference to their exposed, isolated position in the Bransfield Strait

Geography
- Location: Bransfield Strait
- Coordinates: 63°0′S 55°49′W
- Archipelago: Joinville Island group

The Wideopen Islands (63°0′S 55°49′W) are a group of islands and rocks lying 7 nautical miles (13 km) north of Boreal Point, Joinville Island, in Antarctica. Roughly surveyed from a distance by the Falkland Islands Dependencies Survey (FIDS) in 1953–54. So named by United Kingdom Antarctic Place-Names Committee (UK-APC) in 1958 because of their exposed, isolated position on the south side of Bransfield Strait.

The islands are habitat for Adélie, chinstrap, and gentoo penguins.

== See also ==
- List of Antarctic and sub-Antarctic islands
