= Wide Open (novel) =

Novel by Nicola Barker released in 1998

- First edition
- Author: Nicola Barker
- Language: English
- Publisher: Faber and Faber
- Publication date: 1998
- Publication place: United Kingdom
- Media type: Print
- Pages: 290
- ISBN: 978-0-0609-33753

Wide Open is the third novel by English author Nicola Barker published in 1998 by Faber and Faber. In 2000 it won the International IMPAC Dublin Literary Award.

== Plot ==
Set mostly on the Isle of Sheppey on the north coast of Kent on the Thames Estuary. Two men, both called Ronny (one is then renamed to Jim), strike up a strange friendship. Jim invites Ronny to live at his prefab near the beach on the island. They meet an oddball cast of neighbours, including Sara who breeds wild boars, her daughter Lily, Luke a pornographer and part-time nudist, and Carrie an optician who is related to Sara who is investigating an inheritance from her father to Ronny. Then Ronny's brother Nathan arrives as their childhood brings bad memories...

== Reception ==
- The IMPAC prize panel praised the novel: '‘Wide Open is word perfect, witty and ironic...The author's focus on marginal lives and on the importance of the dispossessed and the apparently mad persuade us finally that Wide Open possesses a manic energy and taut eloquence worthy of a large, serious and global readership'
- Boyd Tonkin writing in The Independent: 'It combines Nicola Barker's trademark qualities of offbeat comedy and quirky characterisation with an emotional darkness and depth that marked it, for many critics, as her breakthrough ...The novel mixes an eccentric island backdrop – a Barker speciality – with a cast of intriguing oddballs, pin-sharp comic dialogue, and a sinister undercurrent of violence and abuse'
