= Darkmans =

Written by Nicola barker

First edition (publ. Fourth Estate)

Darkmans is a novel by Nicola Barker written in 2007. The 838 page book takes place in Ashford, in Kent and focuses on a father-son pair named Daniel and Kane Beede. The book was a finalist for the 2007 Man Booker Prize. It is the third of a loose trilogy by the author. The Guardian ranked Darkmans #93 in its list of 100 Best Books of the 21st Century.
