= The Forgotten Waltz =

2012 novel by Anne Enright

- First edition (UK)
- Author: Anne Enright
- Language: English
- Genre: Literary fiction
- Published: April 28, 2011
- Publisher: Jonathan Cape (UK); W. W. Norton & Company (US); McClelland & Stewart (CAN)
- ISBN: 9780393342581

The Forgotten Waltz is an adult romance novel by Anne Enright. Published on April 28 2011, the book was awarded the Andrew Carnegie Medal for Fiction that year.

== Reception ==
The Forgotten Waltz received positive reviews, including starred reviews from Booklist, Publishers Weekly, and Kirkus Reviews. Publishers Weekly called the novel "masterful and deeply satisfying." Kirkus highlighted Enright's writing style, saying, "In rueful, witty, unpredictable and compassionate prose, Enright gives expression to subtle, affecting shades of human interaction."

The book also received the following accolades:

- Orange Prize for Fiction Shortlist Nominee (2012)
- Andrew Carnegie Medal for Fiction (2012)
- Booklist's Top of the List for Adult Fiction (2011)
- Booklist Editors' Choice: Adult Books (2011)
