= Christine Dwyer Hickey =

Irish writer and playwright (born 1960)

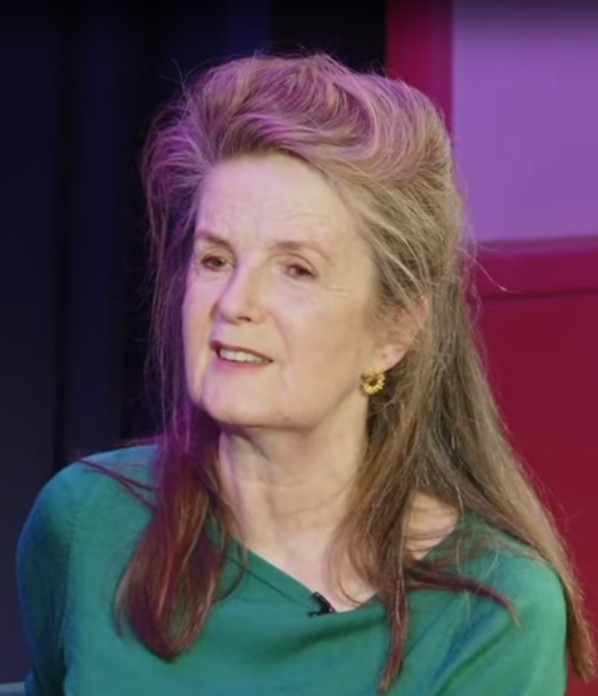
- Hickey in November 2024
- Born: Dublin, Ireland
- Occupation: Writer
- Writing career
- Period: 1991 – present
- Genres: Novel, short story, theatre
- Subjects: Family relationships, addiction, Irish society, effect of war on society, Italian and American society

Christine Dwyer Hickey (born 1960) is an Irish novelist, short story writer and playwright. She has won several awards, including the Kerry Group Irish Novel of the Year and the Walter Scott Prize for Historical Fiction. Her writing was described by Madeleine Kingsley of the Jewish Chronicle as "depicting the parts of human nature that are oblique, suppressed and rarely voiced".

== Early life ==
Christine Dwyer was born in Dublin in 1958, the only girl of four siblings. After her parents' marriage broke up, her father became the chief carer of a somewhat chaotic family. When Hickey was ten years old, she went to Mount Sackville boarding school. She described her years there as a time of stability and creativity. Her childhood has informed some of her work particularly Tatty, a story of a marriage breakup from the child's point of view. It was described in a review published by Independent News & Media as a novel that is both "harrowing" and "immensely funny", one that "does not preach about the horrors of alcoholism [but] allows the reader to experience at first hand the confusion, hurt and despair the children of alcoholic parents suffer".

As a child she spent much time with her father and often went to the races with him. She used this experience in her 1991 short story, Across the Excellent Grass which won the Powers Gold Short Story Competition at Listowel Writers’ Week. She won the same competition the following year with Bridie’s Wedding and was also a prize winner in The Observer/short story competition with Teatro La Fenice.

== Work ==
The Dublin Trilogy was published between 1995 and 2000 as The Dancer, The Gambler and The Gatemaker by Marino Books and was republished by New Island in 2006–07. The trilogy is the story of a Dublin family between the years 1913–1958.

Hickey published Tatty in 2004 followed in 2009 by the Last Train from Liguria, set in Italy during the fascist era and 1990s Dublin. The Cold Eye of Heaven was published by Atlantic UK in 2011 and in the US by Dalkey Archive.

A short story collection, The House on Parkgate Street and other Dublin stories was published in 2012 and Snow Angels, a play, was published in 2014 following its run at the Project Arts Theatre.

Hickey's novel The Cold Eye of Heaven won the Kerry Group Irish Fiction Award in 2012, was nominated for the 2013 International Dublin Literary Award, and shortlisted at the 2011 Irish Book Awards for novel of the year.

In 2018, she won the Walter Scott Prize for Historical Fiction for her novel The Narrow Land. Other novels by Hickey have also been nominated for the Orange Prize, the Prix Européen de Littérature, the 50 Best Books of the Decade and the Hughes & Hughes Novel of the Year. Her short stories have won several awards, most recently the Writing.ie Short Story Award for Back to Bones which was also longlisted for The EFG Sunday Times Short Story Competition 2017. The Lives of Women was published in 2015 and in the US in 2018. Tatty has been chosen as the Dublin: One City One Book for 2020.

She is an elected member of Aosdana, the Irish Academy of Arts.

Hickey has cited James Joyce and Virginia Woolf as her writing influences. A review in the Irish Times compared her short stories to Joyce's Dubliners, and the poet John Montague has likened her work to that of Katherine Mansfield.

== Bibliography ==
=== Novels ===
- The Dancer (1995)
- The Gambler (1996)
- The Gatemaker (2000)
- Tatty (2004), (2006)
- The Dublin Trilogy (2006–2007)
- Last Train from Liguria (2009)
- The Cold Eye of Heaven (2011)
- The Lives of Women (2015)
- The Narrow Land (2019)
- Our London Lives (2024)

=== Short fiction ===
- The House on Parkgate Street and other Dublin Stories (2013)

=== Drama ===
- Snowangels (2015)

== Awards ==
- 1995 Irish Novel of the Year, shortlisted for The Dancer
- 2005 Irish Novel of the Year, shortlisted for Tatty
- 2005 Orange Prize, shortlisted for Tatty
- 2012 Kerrygroup Novel of the Year Award, winner for The Cold Eye of Heaven
- 2012 International Dublin Literary Award, nominated for The Cold Eye of Heaven
- 2017 EFG Sunday Times Short Story Award, longlisted for Back to Bones
- 2017 Writing.ie Short Story Award Irish Book Awards, winner for Back to Bones
- 2019 Irish Novel of the Year, shortlisted for The Narrow Land
- 2020 Walter Scott Prize, winner for The Narrow Land
- 2020 Dalkey Literary Award, winner for The Narrow Land
