= Neil Jordan =

Irish filmmaker and writer (born 1950)

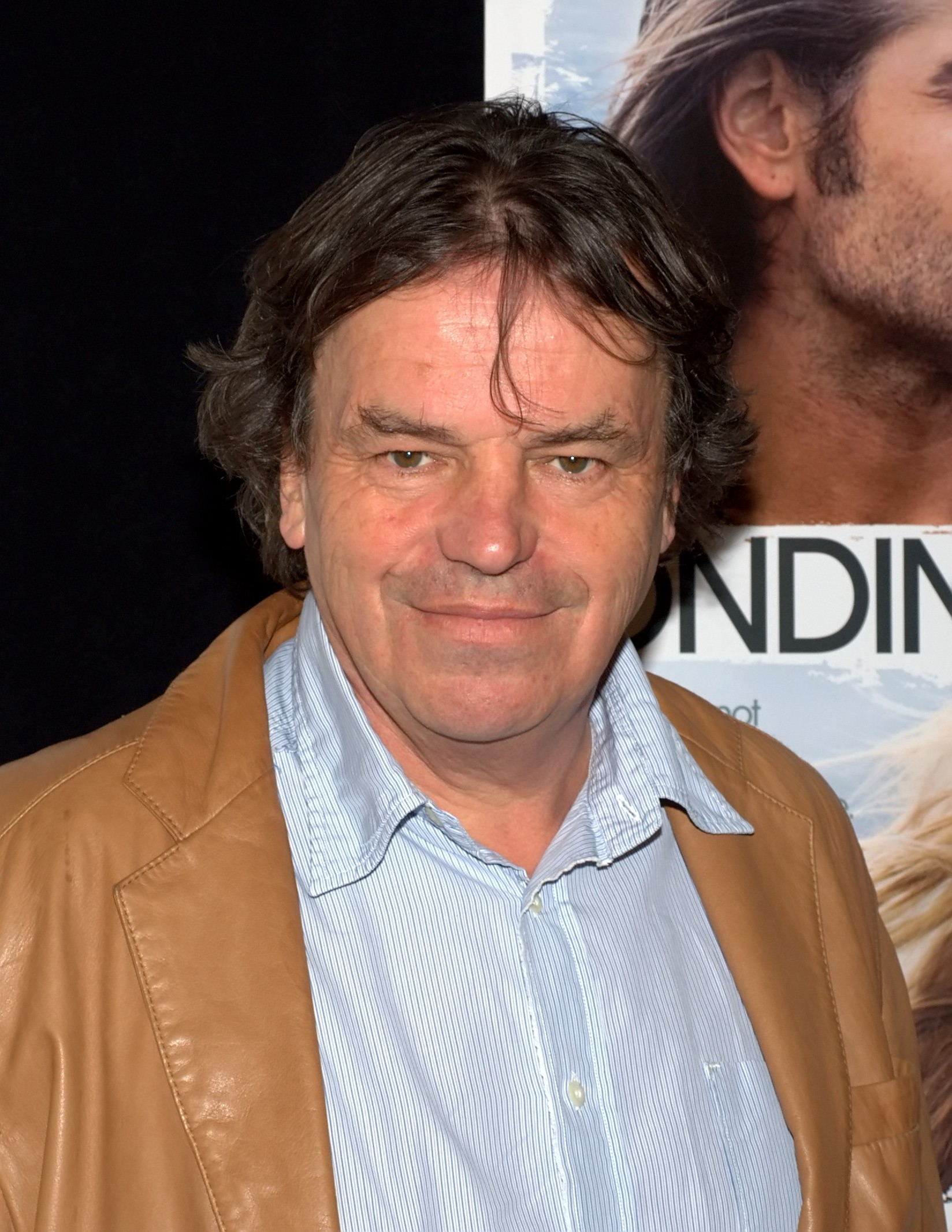
- Jordan at the 2010 Tribeca Film Festival
- Born: Neil Patrick Jordan; 25 February 1950 (age 76); Sligo, Ireland
- Education: University College Dublin (BA)
- Occupations: Filmmaker; writer
- Years active: 1979–present
- Spouses: Vivienne Shields (divorced) Brenda Rawn (m. 2004)
- Children: 5

Neil Patrick Jordan (born 25 February 1950) is an Irish filmmaker and writer. His short story collection, Night in Tunisia, won the Guardian Fiction Prize in 1979. After a stint working at RTÉ, he made his directorial debut with the 1982 film Angel.

Jordan's films include the crime thrillers Mona Lisa (1986) and The Crying Game (1992), the horror dramas Interview with the Vampire (1994) and Byzantium (2012), the biopic Michael Collins (1996), the black comedy The Butcher Boy (1997), the Graham Greene adaptation The End of the Affair (1999), the transgender-themed dramedy Breakfast on Pluto (2005), and the psychological thriller Greta (2018). Jordan also created the Showtime Network television series The Borgias (2011–2013) and Sky Atlantic's Riviera (2017–2020).

He is the recipient of numerous accolades for his film work, including an Academy Award, two BAFTA Awards, three IFTA Film & Drama Awards, a Golden Lion and a Silver Bear. In 1996, he was honoured with receiving the French Ordre des Arts et des Lettres.

== Early life and education ==
Jordan was born in Sligo, the son of Angela (née O'Brien), a painter, and Michael Jordan, a professor. He was educated at St. Paul's College, Raheny. Later, Jordan attended University College Dublin, where he studied Irish history and English literature. He graduated in 1972 with a BA in History. He became involved in student theatre there, where he met Jim Sheridan, who was also later to become an important Irish film director. After graduation, in 1976 Jordan produced his first collection of short stories: Night in Tunisia and other Stories.

Of his religious background, Jordan said in a 1999 Salon interview: "I was brought up a Catholic and was quite religious at one stage in my life, when I was young. But it left me with no scars whatever; it just sort of vanished." He said about his current beliefs that "God is the greatest imaginary being of all time. Along with Einstein's General Theory of Relativity, the invention of God is probably the greatest creation of human thought."

== Career ==
Jordan's career began in the late 1970s working for the Irish television channel RTÉ. His work included writing storylines for the children's fantasy series Wanderly Wagon.

He also worked on his own writing. His first book, a collection of short stories, Night in Tunisia, was published by Dublin's Irish Writers Co-operative in 1976. It won the Guardian Fiction Prize in 1979.

In 1981, when John Boorman was filming Excalibur in Ireland, he recruited Jordan as a "creative associate". A year later, Boorman was executive producer on Jordan's first feature Angel, a tale of a musician caught up in the Troubles. The role was played by Stephen Rea, who has subsequently appeared in almost all of Jordan's films to date.

During the 1980s, Jordan directed films that gained acclaim, including The Company of Wolves and Mona Lisa, both made in England. The Company of Wolves, a dark and sexually themed reimagining of the Little Red Riding Hood fairy tale, based on short stories by Angela Carter, became a cult favourite.

As a writer/director, Jordan has a wide variety of to his body of work, ranging from mainstream hits like Interview with the Vampire to commercial failures like We're No Angels to a variety of more personal, low-budget arthouse pictures. He was also the driving force behind the cable TV series The Borgias.

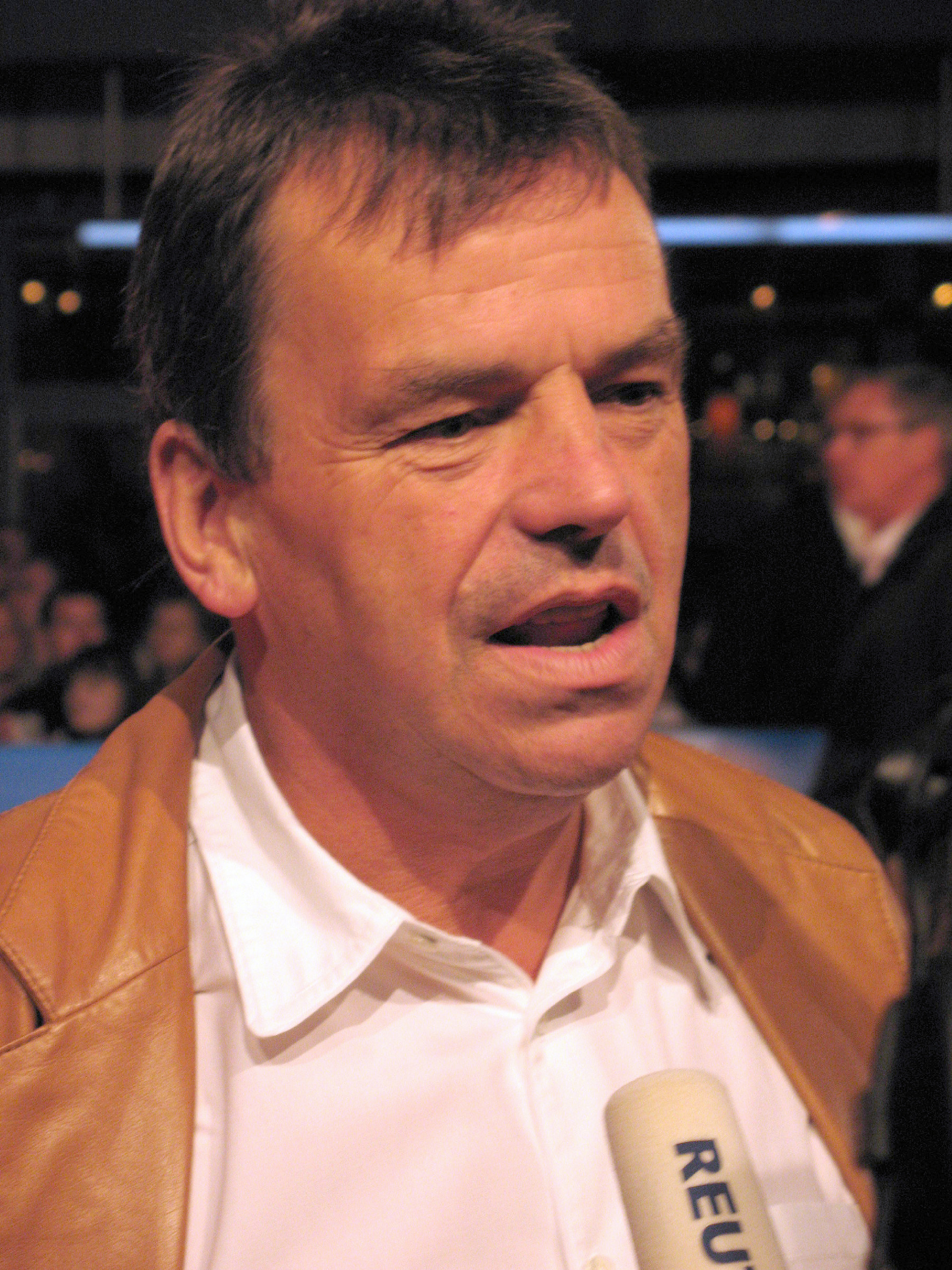
Neil Jordan at the German premiere of The Brave One, 2007

Unconventional sexual relationships are a recurring theme in Jordan's work. He often explores a sympathetic side to characters that audiences would traditionally consider deviant or downright horrifying. His film The Miracle, for instance, follows two characters who struggle to resist a strong, incestuous attraction. Interview with the Vampire, like the Anne Rice book it was based on, focused on the intense, intimate relationship of two undead men who murder humans nightly. (Although the pair never have sex, they are clearly lovers of a sort). They are accompanied by an equally complex vampire woman, who is eternally trapped in the body of a little girl. While Lestat (Tom Cruise) is depicted in an attractive but villainous manner, his partner Louis (Brad Pitt) and the child vampire Claudia (Kirsten Dunst) are meant to capture the audience's sympathy despite their predatory natures.

In his remake of The End of the Affair, based on the novel by Graham Greene, two people (Ralph Fiennes and Julianne Moore) engage in a love affair that begins and ends suddenly, with neither wanting its end.

In addition to the unusual sexuality of Jordan's films, he frequently returns to the Troubles of Northern Ireland. The Crying Game and Breakfast on Pluto are both set during The Troubles, both feature a transgender character (played by Jaye Davidson and Cillian Murphy, respectively), and each has Stephen Rea as leading man. The two films, however, are very different: The Crying Game is a realistic thriller/romance, and Breakfast on Pluto is a much more episodic, stylised, darkly comic biography.

Jordan also frequently makes films exploring the lives of children or young people, such as The Miracle and The Butcher Boy, based on the novel of the same name. His work ranges from films grounded in reality to those of more fantastic or dreamlike quality, such as The Company of Wolves, High Spirits, Interview with the Vampire and In Dreams.

Jordan with Alicja Bachleda-Curuś and Colin Farrell at the Ondine premiere, 2010 Tribeca Film Festival in New York

Jordan's early critical success drew him to Hollywood, where he directed High Spirits and We're No Angels; but both were critical and financial disasters.

He later returned to Ireland to make the more personal The Crying Game, which was nominated for six Academy Awards. Jordan won the Academy Award for Best Original Screenplay for the film. Its unexpected success led him back to American studio filmmaking, where he directed Interview with the Vampire. He also directed the crime drama The Brave One starring Jodie Foster.

Neil Gaiman announced during his Today show appearance on 27 January 2009, that Neil Jordan would be directing the film of his Newbery Medal-winning book The Graveyard Book. Jordan also wrote and directed the 2009 Irish-made film Ondine, starring Colin Farrell and Alicja Bachleda-Curuś. He also directed Byzantium, an adaptation of the vampire play of the same name starring Saoirse Ronan, Gemma Arterton and Jonny Lee Miller.

In 2011, Jordan's next feature was announced as the later aborted sci-fi romance Broken Dream, which was to have featured Ben Kingsley and John Hurt.

He directed the thriller Greta (2018), starring Isabelle Huppert and Chloë Grace Moretz.

After working on scripts for Riviera, Jordan has disowned the show, because his scripts were reworked by others. He said he had no idea who rewrote these episodes. "They were changed, to my huge surprise and considerable upset. There were various sexual scenes introduced into the story and a lot of very expository dialogue. I objected in the strongest terms possible."

== Personal life ==
Jordan has five children: Anna and Sarah from his marriage to solicitor Vivienne Shields; Dashiel and Daniel from his current marriage to Brenda Rawn, and Ben, from a relationship with architect Mary Donohoe. Jordan lives in Dalkey, Dublin.

In 1996, Neil Jordan was honoured with receiving the French Ordre des Arts et des Lettres. He has received many honorary doctorates, including from Trinity College Dublin, University College Dublin, and Queen's University Belfast.

In 2009, he signed a petition in support of director and sex offender Roman Polanski, calling for his release after he was arrested in Switzerland in relation to his 1977 charge for drugging and raping a 13-year-old girl.

In 2018, he donated his archives to the National Library of Ireland. Jordan's donation included TV and film scripts, production files, notebooks, storyboards and personal correspondence with artists and political figures.

== Works ==
=== Film ===
Year	Title	Director	Writer	Producer
1981	Traveller	No	Yes	No
1982	Angel	Yes	Yes	No
1984	The Company of Wolves	Yes	Yes	No
1986	Mona Lisa	Yes	Yes	No
1988	High Spirits	Yes	Yes	No
1989	We're No Angels	Yes	No	No
1991	The Miracle	Yes	Yes	No
1992	The Crying Game	Yes	Yes	No
1994	Interview with the Vampire	Yes	No	No
1996	Michael Collins	Yes	Yes	No
1997	The Butcher Boy	Yes	Yes	executive
1999	In Dreams	Yes	Yes	No
1999	The End of the Affair	Yes	Yes	Yes
2000	Not I	Yes	No	No
2002	The Good Thief	Yes	Yes	executive
2003	The Actors	No	story	executive
2005	Breakfast on Pluto	Yes	Yes	Yes
2007	The Brave One	Yes	No	No
2009	Ondine	Yes	Yes	Yes
2012	Byzantium	Yes	No	No
2018	Greta	Yes	Yes	executive
2022	Marlowe	Yes	Yes	No

Producer only

Year	Title	Director	Notes
1988	The Courier	Frank Deasy; Joe Lee	Executive producer
1999	The Last September	Deborah Warner	Executive producer
2003	Intermission	John Crowley	

Creative associate

- Excalibur (1981)

=== Television ===
Year	Title	Director	Writer	Executive Producer	Creator	Notes
1979	Miracles & Miss Langan	No	Yes	No	No	TV movie
2011–13	The Borgias	Yes	Yes	Yes	Yes	Directed 6 episodes Wrote 20 episodes
2017–20	Riviera	No	Yes	Yes	Yes	Wrote 2 episodes

=== Bibliography ===
- Night in Tunisia (1976, short stories)
- The Past (1980, novel)
- The Dream of a Beast (1983, novella)
- Mona Lisa (1986, screenplay) co-written by David Leland
- Angel (1989, screenplay)
- A Neil Jordan Reader (1993) collects A Night in Tunisia, The Dream of a Beast, and The Crying Game (screenplay)
- Sunrise with Sea Monster (1994, novel) published in the US as ‘’Nightlines’’
- Michael Collins: Screenplay and Film Diary (1996, screenplay)
- Shade (2004, novel)
- Mistaken (2011, novel)
- The Drowned Detective (2016, novel)
- Carnivalesque (2017, novel)
- The Ballad of Lord Edward and Citizen Small (2021, novel)
- The Well of Saint Nobody (2023, novel)
- The Library of Traumatic Memory (2026, novel)

== Awards and nominations ==
Year	Title	Academy Awards		BAFTA Awards		Golden Globe Awards	
Year	Title	Nominations	Wins	Nominations	Wins	Nominations	Wins
1984	The Company of Wolves			4			
1986	Mona Lisa	1		6	1	4	1
1992	The Crying Game	6	1	7	1	1	
1994	Interview with the Vampire	2		4	2	2	
1996	Michael Collins	2		2		2	
1999	The End of the Affair	2		10	1	4	
2005	Breakfast on Pluto					1	
2007	The Brave One					1	
Total		13	1	33	5	15	1

Year	Title	Awards/Nominations
1986	Mona Lisa	Nominated- BAFTA Award for Best Direction; Nominated- BAFTA Award for Best Original Screenplay; Nominated- Golden Globe Award for Best Screenplay
1992	The Crying Game	Academy Award for Best Original Screenplay; Nominated- Academy Award for Best Director; Nominated- BAFTA Award for Best Direction; Nominated- BAFTA Award for Best Original Screenplay
1996	Michael Collins	Golden Lion
1997	The Butcher Boy	Silver Bear for Best Director
1999	The End of the Affair	BAFTA Award for Best Adapted Screenplay; Nominated- BAFTA Award for Best Direction; Nominated- Golden Globe Award for Best Director
2011	The Borgias	Nominated- Primetime Emmy Award for Outstanding Directing for a Drama Series (for episodes "The Poisoned Chalice" and "The Assassin" )

In March 2026, he was awarded the Golden Seal of the Yugoslav Film Archive.

=== Literature ===
- Guardian Fiction Prize for Night in Tunisia (1979)
- Rooney Prize for Irish Literature in 1981
- 2004 Irish PEN Award
- Kerry Group Irish Fiction Award for 'Shade' (2005) and Mistaken (2011)
- 2011 Irish Book Awards Novel of the Year for 'Mistaken'
- UCD Alumni Award in Arts & Humanities 2021

=== Directed Academy Award Performances ===
Under Jordan's direction, these actors have received Academy Award nominations for their performances in these respective roles.

Year	Performer	Film	Result
Academy Award for Best Actor
1987	Bob Hoskins	Mona Lisa	Nominated
1993	Stephen Rea	The Crying Game	Nominated
Academy Award for Best Actress
2000	Julianne Moore	The End of the Affair	Nominated
Academy Award for Best Supporting Actor
1993	Jaye Davidson	The Crying Game	Nominated

== See also ==
- List of Academy Award winners and nominees from Ireland
