= Emer Martin =

Irish novelist, painter and film-maker (born 1972)

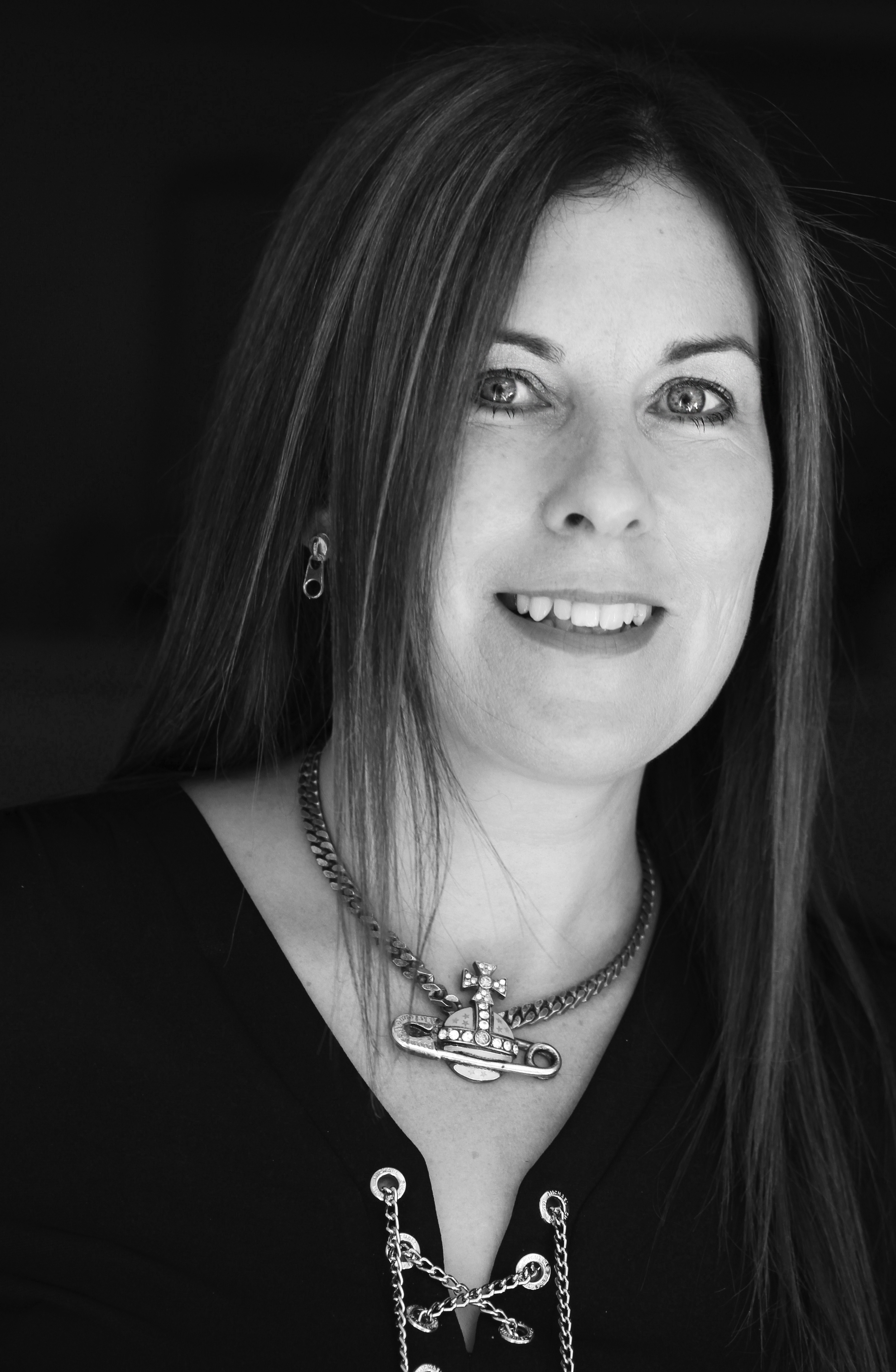
- Emer Martin in September 2014
- Born: 29 February 1972 (age 54); Dublin, Ireland
- Education: Hunter College (BA); San Francisco State University (MFA)
- Occupations: Writer, Film-maker, Painter, Teacher
- Writing career
- Notable works: Breakfast in Babylon, The Cruelty Men
- Website: www.emermartin.com

Emer Martin (born 29 February 1972) is an Irish novelist, painter and film-maker who has also lived in Paris, London, the Middle East, and the United States. Her works have won and been nominated for numerous awards.

== Life ==
Martin was born in Dublin, Ireland, where she lived most of her childhood. At age 17, Martin left Ireland to travel Europe. She earned her Bachelors of Arts degree in English and fine arts from Hunter College, and graduated as class valedictorian in 1988. Martin co-founded an Irish Women's Artists and Performers collective, called Banshee, in 1997. The artists involved delivered performances in dance, fiction, song, poetry, drama and satire. From 1999 to 2002, she worked as contributing editor for BlackBook Magazine. Martin returned to Ireland in 2004, teaching writing at Trinity College. In 2005, she earned a Masters of Fine Arts in Cinema degree from San Francisco State University. Martin has been invited for reading, lectures, and interviews at universities and conferences including Harvard University, Notre Dame University, Brown University, San Francisco State University, Hunter College, and Asilomar Writer's Conference.

Martin currently lives in Palo Alto, California, and teaches English and Journalism at Fremont High School in Sunnyvale, California.

== Fiction ==
Martin has published four novels and three children's books. Her first novel, Breakfast in Babylon, described the life of a young Irishwoman in the Parisian underworld and won Book of the Year at the 1996 Listowel Writers' Week. More Bread Or I'll Appear, her second novel, was published internationally in 1999. Martin's third novel, Baby Zero, was published in March 2007 in Ireland and the United Kingdom by Brandon Publishing and released internationally in 2014 through the publishing co-operative Rawmeash Publishing. In 2018, The Cruelty Men, her fourth novel was published by Lilliput Press and was nominated for Irish Novel of the Year 2019.

In 2013, her first children's book, Why is the Moon following Me?, was published through Rawmeash Publishing. The book was co-authored by Dr. Suzana Tulac and illustrated by Magdalena Zuljevic. Her other children's books, Pooka, published in 2016, and The Pig Who Danced, published in 2017, were published through Rawmeash Publishing as well.

== Other works ==
Martin studied painting in New York while at Hunter College. She has had two sell-out solo shows of her paintings at the Origin Gallery in Dublin.

Martin has worked on four short films. The Motel At The Mouth Of The Tunnel, her first film, released in 2000 and features a young Irish woman who is tricked by her bulimic demon roommate into having a child. Her second film, Valley Of Ghosts, covers a woman who makes a film for her unborn child, whom she is forced to sell and released in 2003. In 2007, Martin co-produced Nuts, which was also Irvine Welsh's directorial debut. She also released her third short film Unaccompanied on DVD in the same year. The film stars Maria Hayden, and features Irvine Welsh as a social worker who finds a young boy from Africa in Dublin.
