= Nicola Barker =

English novelist

- Born: 30 March 1966 (age 60); Ely, England
- Occupation: Novelist
- Writing career
- Period: 1994–present

Nicola Barker (born 30 March 1966) is an English novelist and short story writer.

== Early life and education ==
Barker was born in Ely, Cambridgeshire, England on 30 March 1966. While she was nine, her parents moved the family to South Africa.

== Career ==
Barker typically writes about damaged or eccentric people in mundane situations, and has a fondness for bleak, isolated settings. Wide Open and Behindlings are set respectively on the Isle of Sheppey and Canvey Island. Together with Darkmans (2007), they form an informal trilogy based around the Thames Gateway. Darkmans won the 2008 Hawthornden Prize. Patrick Ness's review in The Guardian described the book as "phenomenally good" despite it being an "838-page epic with little describable plot, taking place over just a few days and set in...Ashford."

Her 2004 novel, Clear, is set in London during David Blaine's Above the Below 44-day fast in London in 2003.

=== Awards and honours ===
- 1993: PEN/Macmillan Silver Pen Award co-winner for Love Your Enemies
- 1993: David Higham Prize for Fiction winner for Love Your Enemies
- 1996: John Llewellyn Rhys Prize winner for Heading Inland
- 2000: International Dublin Literary Award winner for Wide Open
- 2004: Man Booker Prize longlist for Clear: A Transparent Novel
- 2007: Man Booker Prize shortlist for Darkmans
- 2012: Man Booker Prize longlist for The Yips
- 2017: Goldsmiths Prize winner for H(a)ppy

=== Publications ===
==== Novels ====
- Reversed Forecast (1994)
- Small Holdings (1995)
- Wide Open (1998)
- Five Miles from Outer Hope (2000)
- Behindlings (2002)
- Clear: A Transparent Novel (2004)
- Darkmans (2007)
- Burley Cross Postbox Theft (2010)
- The Yips (2012)
- In the Approaches (2014)
- The Cauliflower (2016)
- H(a)ppy (2017)
- I Am Sovereign (2019)
- TonyInterruptor (2025)

==== Collections of stories ====
- Love Your Enemies (1993)
- Heading Inland (1996)
- The Three Button Trick: Selected Stories (2001)

==== Short stories ====
- The Free Hand (1998)
- By Force of Will, Alone (2009)
