= The Gathering (Enright novel) =

2007 novel by Anne Enright

- First edition
- Author: Anne Enright
- Cover artist: Andrew Richards
- Language: English
- Publisher: Jonathan Cape
- Publication date: 3 May 2007
- Publication place: Ireland
- Media type: Print (Hardcover & Paperback)
- Pages: 272 pp (hardcover)
- ISBN: 0-224-07873-9
- OCLC: 77540525
- LC Class: PR6055.N73 G38 2007

The Gathering is a 2007 novel by Irish writer Anne Enright. It won the 2007 Booker Prize.

Although it received mostly favourable reviews on its first publication, sales of The Gathering had been modest before it was named as one of the six books on the Booker Prize shortlist in September 2007. After winning the prize, sales more than doubled compared to sales before the announcement. Enright described the book as "...the intellectual equivalent of a Hollywood weepie."

The novel traces the narrator's inner journey, setting out to derive meaning from past and present events, and takes place in Ireland and England. Its title refers to the funeral of Liam Hegarty, an alcoholic who killed himself in the sea at Brighton. His mother and eight of the nine surviving Hegarty children gather in Dublin for his wake. The novel's narrator is 39-year-old Veronica, the sibling who was closest to Liam. She looks through her family's troubled history to try to make sense of his death. She thinks that the reason for his alcoholism lies in something that happened to him in his childhood when he stayed in his grandmother's house, and uncovers uncomfortable truths about her family.
