= Mister Pip =

Book by Lloyd Jones

- Author: Lloyd Jones
- Genre: Fiction
- Publication date: 2006
- Publication place: New Zealand
- Pages: 256 pp (paperback)
- ISBN: 978-0-385-34107-3

Mister Pip (2006) is a novel by Lloyd Jones, a New Zealand author. It is named after the chief character in, and shaped by the plot of Charles Dickens' novel Great Expectations. The novel was adapted into the film Mr. Pip in 2012.

The novel is set against the backdrop of the civil war on Bougainville Island during the early 1990s. Jones had covered the war in Bougainville as a journalist, but was unable to visit. He learned about atrocities committed there from a Papua New Guinean soldier.

== Plot summary ==
The novel is the story of a girl caught in the throes of war on the island of Bougainville. Matilda survives the war through the guidance of her devoted but strict Christian mother and her white teacher Mr Watts, and also, more importantly, through her connection with the fictional Pip, the protagonist of Charles Dickens' Great Expectations. Pip helps Matilda maintain a desire to live, especially after her mother, Mr Watts, and her island home all cease to exist.

The novel opens with a colourful description of Watts, whom the children call Pop-Eye (The first line of the book being: 'Everyone called him Pop Eye') due to his eyes that "stuck out further than anyone else's". He is married to Grace, a native of Bougainville, which explains why he remains long after most white men had abandoned the island. With military tension rising and the schoolroom growing over with creepers, Watts decides to take on the task of educating the children. Despite his claim to be limited in intelligence, he introduces the students to one of the greatest English authors, Charles Dickens.

Dolores, Matilda's overzealous Christian mother, expresses an extreme distrust of the teacher and his curriculum. She does everything in her power to ensure that her daughter's mind is not polluted by the strange white man, including making weekly visits to the classroom. She even goes as far as stealing and hiding Watts's Great Expectations book, an action that causes immense trouble when "Redskin" soldiers enter the village and find Pip's name carved in the sand. It is Matilda who wrote his name, and it is her guilt that makes her empathise with her mother, who refuses to give up the book as evidence that Pip is not a rebel but a fictional character. Convinced that Pip must be a spy who has been hidden from them, the soldiers destroy the houses. All they leave behind are smoking fragments of the village's former life.

As the tension escalates, a group of rebel soldiers returns to the village to question Watts. He agrees to explain himself over the course of seven nights, and proceeds to tell a story that entwines Pip's life with his own. Matilda develops an idea about why he returned to the island with his wife and stayed after all the other whites left. His wife has died, and Watts considers moving on and offers Matilda a chance to escape from the island. However, she would have to choose between Watts and her mother but before this can happen the rebels flee and the soldiers return.

The soldiers kill Watts, and when Matilda's mother speaks up she is taken away and raped. Matilda is almost raped, but her mother gives up her life to spare her. In the wake of surviving the slaughter of her village, her mother, and Watts, Matilda loses her will to live. She nearly drowns but is revived by the memory of Pip, who also narrowly escaped death. After clinging to a log, Matilda is picked up by the fisherman who had arranged to escape with Watts, and eventually reaches Australia. There she is reunited with her father and begins to pick up the pieces of her disrupted life. She comes to terms with the reality of Watts, who altered both the facts of his life and abridged the contents in Great Expectations in an effort to provide escape from the world, both for himself and for the children. She reveals her success in becoming a scholar and a Dickens expert and concludes her narrative by emphasizing the power of literature to offer escape and solace in the worst of times. Matilda becomes a teacher in Australia in order to fulfill her dream and educate people, but to also keep the memory of Watts alive.

== Main characters ==
- Matilda Laimo is the main character in the novel. She was in her early teens and attending school, taught by Watts after the teachers fled the island once the blockade began. Matilda has lived on the island her whole life: she lives with only her mother Dolores, as her father has left to work abroad. Matilda goes to live with her father in Australia after her mother and Watts are killed
- Tom Watts (Pop Eye) is the only white man left on the island. He has a mysterious history, which many of the islanders long to know about, one being his marriage to Grace. He taught the children of the island and read to them, each day reading a chapter of Great Expectations.
- Dolores Laimo is the mother of Matilda and a strong Christian believer. She has many different viewpoints from Watts.
- Grace (Sheba) is the second wife of Watts. She was born on Bougainville, but moved to Wellington, New Zealand to study dentistry, where she fell in love with Watts. Grace returned to Bougainville with Watts where she lived in an old European mission building.
- Daniel is the character who unintentionally causes Watts' death, and his own by witnessing it. He claims that Watts is Dickens, and when the soldiers come looking for Pip, Watts takes the role of Dickens. This leads to his downfall, as the soldiers kill him because they believe he lied. Daniel is a little bit slow, and when the officer asks 'who saw the white man die?' Daniel puts his hand up and is delighted to know the answer, but the soldiers kill him.

== Awards ==
The novel was shortlisted for the Man Booker Prize in 2007; it won the Commonwealth Writers' Prize for best book in Southeast Asia and the South Pacific and the Montana Medal for Fiction or Poetry and 2008 it won the Kiriyama Prize for books about the Pacific Rim and South Asia. In 2008, the American Library Association recognized it as one of the year's top ten books for young adults.

== Film adaptation ==
Andrew Adamson wrote a film adaption of the novel, called Mr. Pip, which he also directed. Hugh Laurie plays Watts. It was filmed in Bougainville, Papua New Guinea and New Zealand. On July 29 and 30 2011 filming was at Glendowie College, and at a flight training centre at Albert Street, Newmarket, Auckland. They started the post-production phase during November–December 2011 at Park Road Post, ready for it to come out 2012. The movie premiered at the Toronto International Film Festival in September 2012.

The trailer for the film adaptation was released in April 2013, and the film opened in cinemas on October 3.

== See also ==
- Bougainville Island
- History of Bougainville
