= Lloyd Jones (New Zealand author) =

New Zealand writer

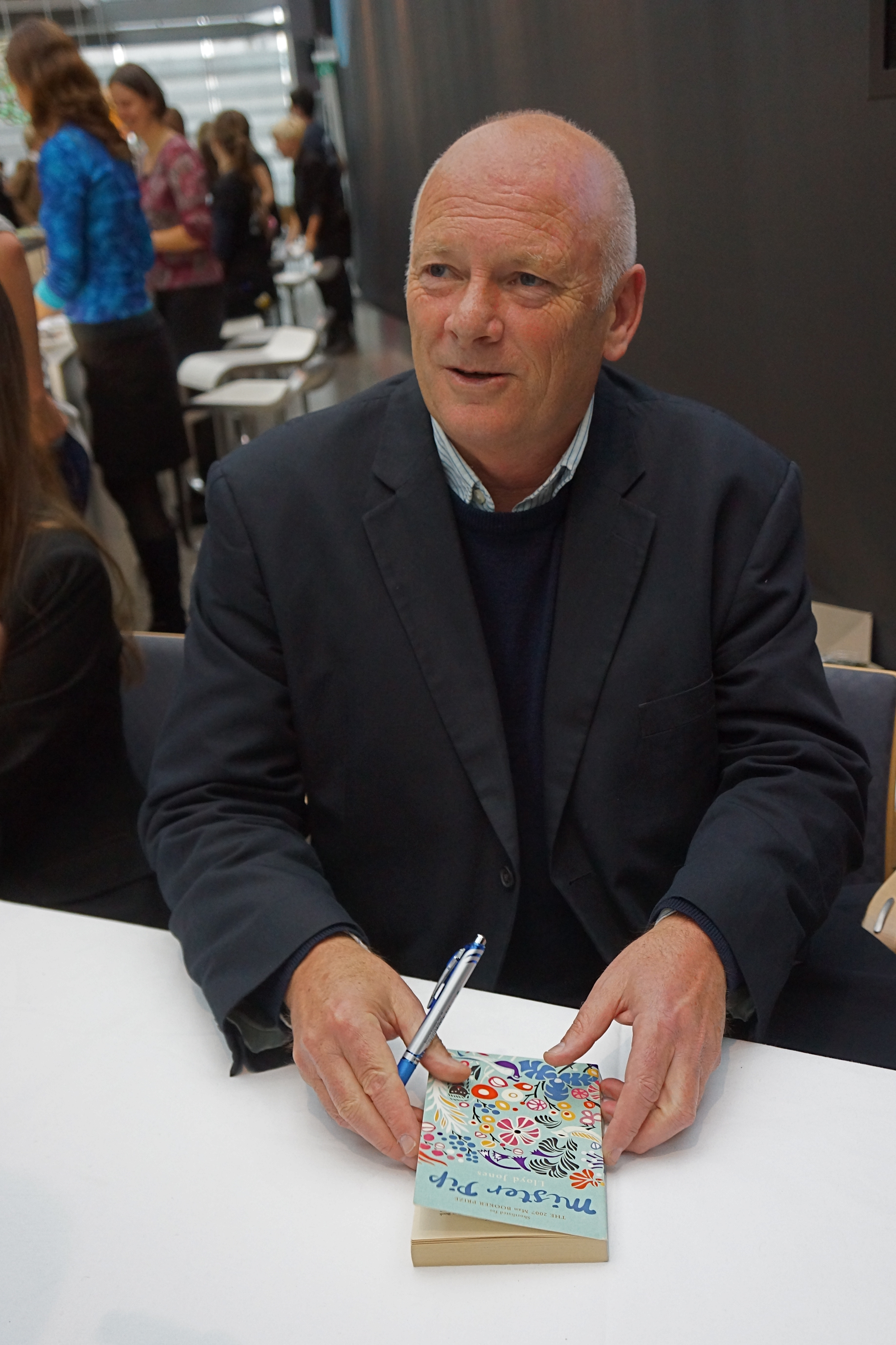
- Jones in 2012
- Born: Lloyd David Jones; 23 March 1955 (age 71); Lower Hutt, New Zealand
- Occupation: Writer
- Children: 3
- Relatives: Bob Jones (brother); Sam Duckor-Jones (son); Bob Brockie (brother-in-law)
- Writing career
- Notable work: Mister Pip

Lloyd David Jones (born 23 March 1955) is a New Zealand author. His novel Mister Pip (2006) won the Commonwealth Writers' Prize and was shortlisted for the Booker Prize.

== Early life, education and family ==
Jones was born in Lower Hutt in 1955, and attended Hutt Valley High School and Victoria University of Wellington. Despite fulfilling the requirements of a political science degree, Jones was unable to graduate from university at the time due to library fines owing; he eventually completed his course of study and graduated in 2007. He was the recipient of an honorary doctorate from Victoria University in May 2009.

Jones's older brother was property investor and former politician Sir Bob Jones. He also has three older sisters.

Jones' partner is Australian writer Carrie Tiffany. He has two sons and a daughter. One of his sons, Avi Duckor-Jones, was the winner of the first season of reality television show Survivor NZ in 2017. His other son, Sam Duckor-Jones, is an artist and poet.

== Literary career ==
After leaving university and spending time travelling overseas, Jones became a sports reporter at The Evening Post, and began writing fiction. His first novel, Gilmore's Dairy (1985), was a satirical novel about a young man growing up in a small New Zealand town, and was followed by Splinter (1988), a novel set in Lower Hutt with two primary narratives (one about an early immigrant and the other about a magazine editor). Like his later work, these two early novels blended suburban realism, black comedy and originality.

In 1988, Jones was the recipient of the Katherine Mansfield Memorial Fellowship. In 1991 he published a short fiction collection, Swimming for Australia (1991), which was shortlisted for the New Zealand Book Award for Fiction. In 1994 he curated an exhibition which illustrated the concept of Saturday in New Zealand life. The work was a collaboration with photographer Bruce Foster and held at the National Library in Wellington. The work was published as The Last Saturday and included historical photographs, contemporary photographs by Foster and an essay by Jones.

In May 2003, a theatrical adaptation of Jones' novel The Book of Fame was presented at Wellington's Downstage Theatre. It was adapted for the stage by Carl Nixon, New Zealand novelist and playwright.

In May 2007, Jones won the Commonwealth Writers' Prize for Overall Best Book Award for his novel Mister Pip. The novel is set during the Bougainville Civil War of the early 1990s in Papua New Guinea. The book was also short-listed for the Man Booker Prize in 2007.

Jones was the 2007 recipient of the Creative New Zealand Berlin Writers' Residency.

Jones was inspired to investigate his family history by the 2011 Christchurch earthquake, and published a memoir, A History of Silence, in 2013.

In 2015 Jones spent a year in Australia as a resident writer at the JM Coetzee Centre for Creative Practice at the University of Adelaide. He subsequently spent 2016–2017 in Berlin as a recipient of a DAAD scholarship.

== Awards and honours ==
- 1989 Meridian Energy Katherine Mansfield Memorial Fellowship
- 1991 Shortlisted for New Zealand Book Award in Fiction for Swimming to Australia, and Other Stories
- 2002 Shortlisted for Montana Book Awards Deutz Medal for Fiction (New Zealand) for Here At the End of the World We Learn to Dance
- 2003 Montana Book Awards Deutz Medal for Fiction for The Book of Fame
- 2003 Tasmania Pacific Fiction Prize for The Book of Fame
- 2004 Spectrum Print Book Design Award for Best Use of Illustration for Napoleon and the Chicken Farmer
- 2004 LIANZA Russell Clark Award for excellence in children's illustration for Napoleon and the Chicken Farmer
- 2004 New Zealand Post Book Honour Award for Napoleon and the Chicken Farmer
- 2005 Commonwealth Writers' Prize (Commended Title) for Paint Your Wife
- 2005 Storylines Notable Non-fiction Book for Everything You Need to Know About the World by Simon Eliot
- 2007 Montana Medal for Fiction (New Zealand) and Montana Readers' Choice Award for Mister Pip
- 2007 Shortlisted for the Man Booker Prize for Fiction for Mister Pip
- 2007 Creative New Zealand Berlin Writers Residency
- 2007 Commonwealth Writers' Prize for Overall Best Book for Mister Pip
- 2008 Antarctica New Zealand Arts Fellowship
- 2008 Arts Foundation of New Zealand Laureate
- 2008 Kiriyama Prize for Mister Pip
- 2008 Richard & Judy Book Club - Mister Pip, 10 pick of the year
- 2008 Prime Minister's Awards for Literary Achievement
- 2009 Honorary Doctorate Degree from Victoria University of Wellington, New Zealand

== Selected works ==
- Gilmore's Dairy (1985)
- Splinter (1988)
- Swimming to Australia, and Other Stories (1991)
- Biografi: An Albanian Quest (1993) – a New York Times Notable Book.
- This House Has Three Walls (1997)
- Choo Woo (1998)
- Book of Fame (2000)
- Here at the End of the World We Learn to Dance (2002)
- Napoleon and the Chicken Farmer (2003)
- Everything You Need to Know about the World by Simon Eliot, illustrated by Timon Maxey (Four Winds Press, 2004); US title, Everything You Need to Know About the World (2007)
- Paint Your Wife (2004)
- Mister Pip (2006)
- Hand Me Down World (2010)
- The Man in the Shed (2011)
- A History of Silence: A memoir (Auckland: Penguin, 2013)
- The Cage (2018)
- The Fish (2022)
