= Barnes & Noble Discover Prize =

American literary award

- Awarded for: Authors' debut books
- Presented by: Barnes & Noble

The Barnes & Noble Discover Prize, formerly the Barnes & Noble Discover Great New Writers Award, is an annual literary prize presented by Barnes & Noble for author's debut books.

It was founded with the aim of recognizing and celebrating exceptional emerging authors who demonstrate outstanding talent and promise in their writing.

== Honorees ==
Early versions of the award were presented as two awards, one for fiction and one for nonfiction, with second and third place recipients. More recent editions present a single award winner with a list of finalists.

=== 1997–2019 ===
Award honorees, 1997–2019
Year	Category	Author	Title	Result	Ref
1995	Fiction	Chang-rae Lee	Native Speaker	Won	
1996	Fiction	Elizabeth McCracken	The Giant's House	Won	
1996	Nonfiction	Anthony Doerr	The Shell Collector	Won	
1997	Fiction	J. Robert Lennon	The Light of Falling Stars	1	
2001	Fiction	Manil Suri	The Death of Vishnu	1	
2004	Fiction	Monica Ali	Brick Lane	1	
2004	Fiction	Zoë Heller	What Was She Thinking?	2	
2004	Fiction	Julie Orringer	How to Breathe Underwater	3	
2004	Nonfiction	Jay Griffiths	A Sideways Look at Time	1	
2004	Nonfiction	Christina Lamb	The Sewing Circles of Herat	2	
2004	Nonfiction	Floyd Skloot	In the Shadow of Memory	3	
2005	Fiction	Uzodinma Iweala	Beasts of No Nation	1	
2005	Fiction	Kitty Fitzgerald	Pigtopia	2	
2005	Fiction	Catherine Tudish	Tenney's Landing	3	
2005	Nonfiction	Nathaniel Fick	One Bullet Away	1	
2005	Nonfiction	Martin Moran	The Tricky Part	2	
2005	Nonfiction	Louise Brown	The Dancing Girls of Lahore	3	
2006	Fiction	Ben Fountain	Brief Encounters with Che Guevara	1	
2006	Fiction	O. Z. Livaneli	Bliss	2	
2006	Fiction	Sam Savage	Firmin: Adventures of a Metropolitan Lowlife	3	
2006	Nonfiction	Eric Blehm	The Last Season	1	
2006	Nonfiction	Daniel Mendelsohn	The Lost: A Search for Six of Six Million	2	
2006	Nonfiction	Marilyn Johnson	The Dead Beat: Lost Souls, Lucky Stiffs, and the Perverse Pleasures of Obituaries	3	
2007	Fiction	Joshua Ferris	Then We Came to the End	1	
2007	Fiction	Matthew Eck	The Farther Shore	2	
2007	Fiction	Vendela Vida	Let the Northern Lights Erase Your Name	3	
2007	Nonfiction	Kate Braestrup	Here If You Need Me	1	
2007	Nonfiction	Elizabeth Samet	Soldier's Heart	2	
2007	Nonfiction	Yaroslav Trofimov	The Siege of Mecca	3	
2008	Fiction	Gin Phillips	The Well and the Mine	1	
2008	Fiction	Benjamin Taylor	The Book of Getting Even	2	
2008	Fiction	Zachary Lazar	Sway	3	
2008	Nonfiction	David Sheff	Beautiful Boy: A Father's Journey Through His Son's Addiction	1	
2008	Nonfiction	Eric Weiner	The Geography of Bliss	2	
2008	Nonfiction	Nia Wyn	Blue Sky July	3	
2009	Fiction	Victor Lodato	Mathilda Savitch	1	
2009	Fiction	Barbara Johnson	More of this World or Maybe Another	2	
2009	Fiction	C. E. Morgan	All the Living	3	
2009	Nonfiction	Dave Cullen	Columbine	1	
2009	Nonfiction	Toby Lester	The Fourth Part of the World: The Epic Story of History's Greatest Map	2	
2009	Nonfiction	Neil White	In the Sanctuary of Outcasts	3	
2010	Fiction	Kim Echlin	The Disappeared	1	
2010	Fiction	Eric Puchner	Model Home	2	
2010	Fiction	Nic Pizzolatto	Galveston	3	
2010	Nonfiction	David R. Dow	The Autobiography of an Execution	1	
2010	Nonfiction	Rebecca Skloot	The Immortal Life of Henrietta Lacks	2	
2010	Nonfiction	Siddhartha Mukherjee	The Emperor of All Maladies: A Biography of Cancer	3	
2011	Fiction	Scott O'Connor	Untouchable	1	
2011	Fiction	Alice LaPlante	Turn of Mind	2	
2011	Fiction	Alan Heathcock	Volt	3	
2011	Nonfiction	Michael Levy	Kosher Chinese	1	
2011	Nonfiction	Annia Ciezadlo	Day of Honey	2	
2011	Nonfiction	Joshua Cody	[sic]	3	
2012	Fiction	Amanda Coplin	The Orchardist	1	
2012	Fiction	Karen Thompson Walker	The Age of Miracles	2	
2012	Fiction	Eowyn Ivey	The Snow Child	3	
2012	Nonfiction	Cheryl Strayed	Wild	1	
2012	Nonfiction	Katherine Boo	Behind the Beautiful Forevers	2	
2012	Nonfiction	Kristen Iversen	Full Body Burden	3	
2013	Fiction	Anthony Marra	A Constellation of Vital Phenomena	1	
2013	Fiction	NoViolet Bulawayo	We Need New Names	2	
2013	Fiction	Rebecca Lee	Bobcat and Other Stories	3	
2013	Nonfiction	Justin St. Germain	Son of a Gun	1	
2013	Nonfiction	Sonali Deraniyagala	Wave	2	
2013	Nonfiction	Domenica Ruta	With or Without You	3	
2014	Fiction	Evie Wyld	All the Birds, Singing	1	
2014	Fiction	Molly Antopol	The UnAmericans	2	
2014	Fiction	Arna Bontemps Hemenway	Elegy on Kinderklavier	3	
2014	Nonfiction	Bryce Andrews	Badluck Way: A Year on the Ragged Edge of the West	1	
2014	Nonfiction	Caitlin Doughty	Smoke Gets in Your Eyes: And Other Lessons from the Crematory	2	
2014	Nonfiction	Will Harlan	Untamed: The Wildest Woman in America and the Fight for Cumberland Island	3	
2015	Fiction	Mia Alvar	In the Country	1	
2015	Fiction	Angela Flournoy	The Turner House	2	
2015	Fiction	Sophie McManus	The Unfortunates	3	
2015	Nonfiction	Jill Leovy	Ghettoside: A True Story of Murder in America	1	
2015	Nonfiction	George Hodgman	Bettyville	2	
2015	Nonfiction	Amy Ellis Nutt	Becoming Nicole	3	
2016	Fiction	Abby Geni	The Lightkeepers	1	
2016	Fiction	Yaa Gyasi	Homegoing	2	
2016	Fiction	Jung Yun	Shelter	3	
2016	Nonfiction	Matthew Desmond	Evicted: Poverty and Profit in the American City	1	
2016	Nonfiction	Hope Jahren	Lab Girl	2	
2016	Nonfiction	Patrick Phillips	Blood at the Root: A Racial Cleansing in America	3	
2017	Fiction	Patty Yumi Cottrell	Sorry to Disrupt the Peace	1	
2017	Fiction	Megan Hunter	The End We Start From	2	
2017	Fiction	Lisa Ko	The Leavers	3	
2017	Nonfiction	Jessica Bruder	Nomadland: Surviving America in the Twenty-First Century	1	
2017	Nonfiction	Leah Carroll	Down City: A Daughter's Story of Love, Memory and Murder	2	
2017	Nonfiction	Michael Twitty	The Cooking Gene: A Journey through African American Culinary History in the Old South	3	
2018	Fiction	Paul Howarth	Only Killers and Thieves	1	
2018	Fiction	Tommy Orange	There There	2	
2018	Fiction	Fatima Farheen Mirza	A Place for Us	3	
2018	Nonfiction	Kiese Laymon	Heavy	1	
2018	Nonfiction	Shane Bauer	American Prison	2	
2018	Nonfiction	Tara Westover	Educated	3	
2019	Fiction	Claire Adam	The Golden Child	Won	
2019	Fiction	Lydia Fitzpatrick	Lights All Night Long	Shortlisted	
2019	Fiction	Ocean Vuong	On Earth We're Briefly Gorgeous	Shortlisted	
2019	Fiction	Regina Porter	The Travelers	Shortlisted	
2019	Nonfiction	Damon Young	What Doesn't Kill You Makes You Blacker	Won	
2019	Nonfiction	Saeed Jones	How We Fight for Our Lives	Shortlisted	
2019	Nonfiction	Jaquira Díaz	Ordinary Girls	Shortlisted	
2019	Nonfiction	Jia Tolentino	Trick Mirror	Shortlisted	

=== 2022–present ===
Award honorees, 2022–present
Year	Author	Title	Result	Ref.
2022	Tess Gunty	The Rabbit Hutch	Won	
2022	Louise Kennedy	Trespasses	Shortlisted	
2022	Sequoia Nagamatsu	How High We Go in the Dark	Shortlisted	
2022	Morgan Talty	Night of the Living Rez	Shortlisted	
2022	Sarah Thankam Mathews	All This Could Be Different	Shortlisted	
2022	Laura Warrell	Sweet, Soft, Plenty Rhythm	Shortlisted	
2023	Amanda Peters	The Berry Pickers	Won	
2023	Nana Kwame Adjei-Brenyah	Chain-Gang All-Stars	Shortlisted	
2023	John Manuel Arias	Where There Was Fire	Shortlisted	
2023	Brinda Charry	The East Indian	Shortlisted	
2023	Henry Hoke	Open Throat	Shortlisted	
2023	Alice Winn	In Memoriam	Shortlisted	
2024	Essie Chambers	Swift River	Won	
2024	Kaveh Akbar	Martyr!	Shortlisted	
2024	Tammy Armstrong	Pearly Everlasting	Shortlisted	
2024	Abraham Chang	888 Love and the Divine Burden of Numbers: A Novel	Shortlisted	
2024	Lottie Hazell	Piglet	Shortlisted	
2024	Elizabeth O'Connor	Whale Fall	Shortlisted	
2025	Katie Yee	Maggie; Or, a Man and a Woman Walk Into a Bar	Won	
2025	Jason Diamond	Kaplan's Plot	Shortlisted	
2025	Rob Franklin	Great Black Hope	Shortlisted	
2025	Emma Pattee	Tilt	Shortlisted	
2025	Lucy Steeds	The Artist and the Feast	Shortlisted	
2025	Stephanie Wambugu	Lonely Crowds	Shortlisted	
2026	Vincent Yu	Seek Immediate Shelter	Won	
2026	Natalie Adler	Waiting on a Friend	Shortlisted	
2026	Woody Brown	Upward Bound	Shortlisted	
2026	Caro Claire Burke	Yesteryear	Shortlisted	
2026	Madeline Cash	Lost Lambs	Shortlisted	
2026	Patricia Finn	The Golden Boy	Shortlisted	

== See also ==
- Barnes & Noble Book of the Year
- Barnes & Noble Children's & Young Adult Book Awards
