= Pattee =

Pattee may refer to:

== People ==
- David Pattee, Canadian businessman and judge
- Elizabeth Greenleaf Pattee, American landscape designer
- Emma Pattee, American journalist and writer
- Erin Pattee, better known as Erin Brockovich
- Frank Pattee, American football halfback
- Fred Lewis Pattee, American author and scholar
- Harry Pattee, American baseball player
- Howard H. Pattee, American biology professor
- Pattee Byng, 2nd Viscount Torrington, British naval officer and statesman

== Places ==
- Pattee Hall, part of the University of Minnesota Old Campus Historic District
- Pattee Island, located in Nunavut, Canada
- Pattee Library, one of the Pennsylvania State University Libraries
- Pattee Station, a former railway station in the West Canaan village of Canaan, New Hampshire
- Pattee's Caves (also known as Jonathan Pattee's Cave), an early name for the archaeological site now known as America's Stonehenge

== Other ==
- Cross pattée (also cross pattee), a type of cross
