= Upward Bound (disambiguation) =

Upward Bound is a federally funded educational program within the United States.

Upward Bound may also refer to:

- Upward Bound Math Science, an American program for high school students who are underprivileged or are the first person in their family to attend college
- Upward Bound High School in Hartwick, New York, is the first alternative education program in Otsego County
- Upward Bound Youth Ministries in Cincinnati, Ohio, USA, associated with Allen Temple AME Church
- Upward Bound (novel), a 2026 novel by Woody Brown
