= Game Over (Sheff book) =

1993 book by David Sheff

Game Over: How Nintendo Zapped an American Industry, Captured Your Dollars, and Enslaved Your Children
- First edition
- Author: David Sheff
- Language: English
- Publisher: Random House, Inc. (New York)
- Publication date: 1993
- Publication place: United States
- Media type: Hardcover, paperback
- Pages: 445 (1st edition)
- ISBN: 0-679-40469-4
- OCLC: 26214063
- Dewey Decimal: 338.7/617948/0952 20
- LC Class: HD9993.E454 N577 1993

Game Over: How Nintendo Zapped an American Industry, Captured Your Dollars, and Enslaved Your Children is a non-fiction book about the history of the Nintendo electronic gaming company written by David Sheff and published by Random House, New York in 1993. Based on extensive interviews of high-level historical figures, it has provided a research foundation for subsequent works, with a positive critical reception.

== Overview ==
The book details the modern history of Japanese gaming giant Nintendo and its rise to become the most powerful electronic gaming company in the world as of 1993. The book also provides a history of the video gaming industry as a whole from the 1960s to the 1990s.

Sheff describes the history of Nintendo since its founding in 1889, focusing in particular on the company's operations in the United States. Seeking to answer how Nintendo became a dominant force in the U.S. video game market, the author describes its business practices and strategy, as well as the controversies surrounding it, including accusations of anti-competitive practices and the alleged harmful effects of games on young people. The book also briefly describes the history of other game companies, such as Atari and Electronic Arts.

Despite the book's title, Sheff's writing is actually fairly neutral: he mainly relates the history of the company while discussing both the positives and negatives of its business practices. Sheff attributes many of Nintendo's successes to what reviewer James Fallows termed "the Japanese system's tolerance for monopoly". Sheff defends the accuracy of the "enslaved your children" portion of the subtitle, stating that "kids will play the games compulsively and non-stop".

The book provides a foundation for subsequent historical research because the author extensively interviewed numerous industry figures, such as Howard Lincoln, Nolan Bushnell, Shigeru Miyamoto (misspelled as "Sigeru" if regarding Hepburn romanization as definitive), Hiroshi Yamauchi, Minoru Arakawa, Alexey Pajitnov, and anonymous sources.

== Background ==
David Sheff was a journalist previously best known for his interviews with John Lennon and Yoko Ono for Playboy magazine. He became interested in the topic of Nintendo after his son Nic Sheff received a Nintendo Entertainment System console for Christmas, which – according to Sheff – quickly became an "obsession" for the boy and his friends. Sheff convinced the editor-in-chief of Men's Life magazine of his idea, who then sent him on his first trips to Nintendo's headquarters in America and Japan. Initially, Sheff planned to write only an article about Nintendo, but the plan ultimately evolved into writing an entire book.

== Publication ==
Prior to the book's publication, its excerpts appeared in San Francisco Focus, Men's Life, Playboy and Rolling Stone magazines. The first edition of the book was published by Random House on March 1, 1993, with the subtitle How Nintendo Zapped an American Industry, Captured Your Dollars, and Enslaved Your Children.

Game Over: How Nintendo Conquered the World, an edition published by Vintage Press in 1994, contains a new foreword written by Sheff pertaining to the controversy over video game content in the early 1990s. New subjects discussed in this edition include the controversy over the censored SNES release of Mortal Kombat, the growing competition from Sony, Atari and 3DO, and the announcement of the new Nintendo 64 console.

In 1999, a revised edition of the book titled Game Over: Press Start to Continue – The Maturing of Mario (referencing Nintendo's flagship character Mario) was published by GamePress. It has error corrections as well as photographs and a new chapter written by Andy Eddy which summarizes important events in the game industry since the first edition, such as the advent of video game content rating systems and the inauguration of the Electronic Entertainment Expo. An edited version was printed by Coronet Books and given away free with the May 1999 issue of Arcade magazine.

== Reception ==
The book had a mostly positive reception. Christopher Lehmann–Haupt of The New York Times wrote that the book is "irresistible ... Game Over tells a remarkable series of stories ... And maybe that is its hidden message. Maybe that is what makes it, at its best, almost as hypnotic as a successful video game." Alex Kozinsky of The Wall Street Journal called it "the bible of the videogame industry" and "ultimately less absorbing than Tetris, but not by much". Clarence Petersen of the Chicago Tribune called it "a cross between Barbarians at the Gate and The Soul of a New Machine", while Steven L. Kent from that same newspaper, reviewing a later edition, described it as "an excellent read for anybody" and "the best look at Nintendo ever given to the public." People magazine said, "Writing with the playful pluck of Mario [...] Sheff unfolds an engrossing tale." Fellow technology historian Steven Levy said, "Mr. Sheff is comprehensive and instructive. ... Whoever those future billionaires are, they would do well to read this book." Alan Deutschman of Fortune said, "Finally, a book as provocative as its title, Game Over is a detailed, fascinating, and instructive case study". Deirdre McMurdy of Maclean's said, "Sheff painstakingly documents the history of Nintendo and its relentless rise to dominance of the global toy industry." Next Generation gave a positive review for the breadth, quality of research, and easy readability. It remarked that the one flaw is that the frequent detours from the Nintendo story give the reader the feeling that the book is an overview of gaming history in general with an unbalanced focus on Nintendo. It concluded, "Next Generation uses Game Over as a reference guide on a day-to-day basis, and we really can't give any higher recommendation than that." Publishers Weekly criticized the book as "overlong" and "overwhelmed by an excess of superfluous details and scene-setting". Similarly, William Leith from The Independent criticized Game Over for its abundance of anecdotal detail, stating that the book "would have been better at half the length. At a quarter of the length, it might even have been brilliant."

=== Legacy ===
Game Over quickly gained a reputation as one of the best sources of information on Nintendo. In 1999, IGN described the book as a "constant reference point" for many publicists writing about video games, as well as "the ultimate Bible for a videogamer". In 2015, Jeremy Parish of US Gamer stated that Sheff's high level of interview access to major historical figures was "unprecedented (and unduplicated)". He described Game Over as "the definitive work" which has been referenced by nearly all other subsequent books and articles about Nintendo's history.
