= Andy Eddy =

American video game journalist (born 1958)

- Born: Andrew Eddy; January 30, 1958 (age 68)
- Occupations: Journalist, editor
- Known for: Editor, VideoGames & Computer Entertainment; Co-author, Game Over: Press Start to Continue

Andy Eddy is an American video game journalist and critic. He resides in Redwood City, California.

== Biography ==
Eddy was the executive editor (and de facto editor-in-chief) of VideoGames & Computer Entertainment in the late 1980s and early 1990s, followed by tenure as a senior editor at GamePro magazine. He has freelanced for several publications in his 20-year career and wrote “Biz Buzz,” a column about the video game business for GameSpy, from 2002 to 2004, including a somewhat controversial analysis of questionable circulation data and audit methods for Game Informer magazine. He has been employed as Senior Editorial Manager of Community Sites at IGN Entertainment in Brisbane, California and ended his run as Editor in Chief at TeamXbox in March 2010.

Sometime in the early 1990s, Eddy and his family made an appearance on The People’s Court. They were suing Dr. Dennis Hayes for $5,000 because they claimed that Dr. Hayes did not insert instructions in seasick patch prescriptions which warn against use by children under the age of 12. Because of this, his then 8-year-old daughter Meghan suffered hallucinations on their Christmas cruise. In the end, they received $3,025.

Eddy is also the author of several books, including Internet After Hours and several TurboGrafx-16 code books. Eddy also created new content for an updated edition of David Sheff's book Game Over: How Nintendo Zapped an American Industry, Captured Your Dollars, and Enslaved Your Children in 1999. The retitled Game Over: Press Start to Continue includes new interviews and updated company history, written by Eddy.

Eddy is also notable for setting up one of the first online archive dedicated to gaming. His personal FTP site at Netcom was among the first internet archives for gaming FAQs and information in 1994. A mirror of Eddy's site would later develop into the popular website GameFAQs.

Eddy is the Editor in Chief of @Gamer Magazine.
