= Beautiful Boy (2018 film) =

2018 film by Felix van Groeningen

- Theatrical release poster
- Directed by: Felix van Groeningen
- Screenplay by: Luke Davies; Felix van Groeningen
- Based on: Beautiful Boy: A Father's Journey Through His Son's Addiction by David Sheff; Tweak: Growing Up on Methamphetamines by Nic Sheff
- Produced by: Dede Gardner; Jeremy Kleiner; Brad Pitt
- Starring: Steve Carell; Timothée Chalamet; Maura Tierney; Amy Ryan
- Cinematography: Ruben Impens
- Edited by: Nico Leunen
- Production companies: Plan B Entertainment; Big Indie Pictures; FilmNation Entertainment
- Distributed by: Amazon Studios
- Release dates: September 7, 2018 (TIFF); October 12, 2018 (United States)
- Running time: 120 minutes
- Country: United States
- Language: English
- Budget: $19.3–25 million
- Box office: $31.7 million

Beautiful Boy is a 2018 American biographical drama film directed by Felix van Groeningen from a screenplay by Luke Davies and Van Groeningen and based on the 2008 memoirs Beautiful Boy: A Father's Journey Through His Son's Addiction by David Sheff and Tweak: Growing Up on Methamphetamines by Nic Sheff. It stars Steve Carell, Timothée Chalamet, Maura Tierney, and Amy Ryan. In the film, the father-son relationship between David Sheff (Carell) and Nic Sheff (Chalamet) becomes increasingly strained by the latter's drug addiction.

Beautiful Boy is Van Groeningen's English-language feature debut. The film had its world premiere at the Toronto International Film Festival on September 7, 2018, and was theatrically released in the United States on October 12, 2018, by Amazon Studios. It grossed US$31.7 million against a budget of $19.3–25 million and received generally positive reviews from critics, who praised the performances of Carell and Chalamet. For his work, Chalamet earned nominations at the Golden Globes, Screen Actors Guild Awards, BAFTA Awards, and Critics' Choice Awards, among others.

== Plot ==
New York Times writer David Sheff's teenage son Nicolas "Nic" Sheff goes missing, reappearing at home two days later. Seeing obvious signs of drug use, David takes Nic to a drug rehabilitation clinic. Nic makes progress, and Nic transfers to a halfway house, with the agreement of Nic's doctors. Days later, Nic disappears, and David finds him strung out, wandering the streets.

Back at the drug rehab facility, Nic reveals that he has been using numerous drugs, including crystal meth. Nic eventually completes his rehab program. Seeing his improvements, David—in a moment of wishful thinking—lets him leave for college on his own to become a writer. Nic's newfound freedom and sobriety start off well, as he becomes a good student and begins a relationship with his classmate Julia. During a happy family dinner at his girlfriend's parents' house, Nic finds a bottle of pills in a medicine cabinet and swallows one. After this incident, he slowly relapses back into drug addiction, pushing Julia to break up with him. His substance use escalates until he eventually purchases heroin.

Around this time, having grown increasingly suspicious of Nic's slowly changing behavior—such as stealing his younger siblings' savings—David decides to read Nic's diary. To his horror, Nic has filled half the pages with colorful descriptions of his deepening addictions, expressed through troubling language and disturbing cartoons. On one of the last pages, Nic writes of his difficulty obtaining meth in college; he does, however, note that he managed to score some heroin.

Returning home, David senses that Nic is using drugs again. Nic leaves home, feeling claustrophobic from his dad's suspicions about his drug use. David and Nic finally meet up, and Nic asks his dad for money so he can go to New York. Knowing the money will almost certainly go towards buying drugs, David declines, and Nic angrily leaves. David later gets a call from a New York hospital saying Nic has overdosed. David flies there to retrieve him, and after talking to his ex-wife and Nic's mother, Vicki, he decides Nic should be sent to live with her in Los Angeles.

Nic has a fresh start in Los Angeles. He attends twelve-step program meetings, spends time with his sobriety sponsor, Spencer, and even works at a drug rehab clinic to help newer patients overcome their addiction. Fourteen months sober, Nic drives to visit David and his family. Seeing Nic back to his old self and interacting happily with his two younger half-siblings, Daisy and Jasper, David is proud of his son's newfound sobriety, as is his wife, Nic's stepmother, Karen. As he departs from their home, however, Nic has a sudden surge of depression, resents his sobriety, and fears relapsing. Spencer gives Nic moral support over the phone, but to little avail. Later that night, Nic drives into San Francisco, where he runs into Lauren, a fellow drug addict from his past, and confesses his desire to "party", despite having been clean for quite some time. The two buy various drugs on the streets, which they proceed to inject together at Lauren's place, and they have sex.

When he learns Nic has gone missing again, David prepares to look for him, but Karen protests that he has done everything he can for Nic and cannot do anything to fix his addiction if his son is not willing to help himself—a reality David heartbrokenly accepts. One day, Nic and Lauren break into the home while David and his family are away and retrieve some valuable items. The family comes home, and the two quickly depart. At first, they go undetected, but David's other son, Jasper, notices Nic, and David and Karen go to find them. Karen chases them in their car but stops and lets them drive off.

Lauren overdoses but is revived by Nic and is sent to the hospital. Nic tearfully calls David and asks for permission to come home, but his father declines. Nic continues to plead, but David hangs up and breaks down in tears. Despairing, Nic overdoses and barely survives. David and Vicki visit him in the hospital, and David and Nic tearfully embrace.

Closing credits reveal that Nic has been sober for eight years and that it would not have been possible without the love and support of his family and friends. During the credits, Nic recites "Let It Enfold You", a poem by Charles Bukowski.

== Cast ==
- Steve Carell as David Sheff
- Timothée Chalamet as Nicolas "Nic" Sheff
  - Jack Dylan Grazer as 12-year-old Nic Sheff
  - Zachary Rifkin as 8-year-old Nic Sheff
  - Kue Lawrence as 4 and 6-year-old Nic Sheff
- Maura Tierney as Karen Barbour-Sheff
- Christian Convery as Jasper Sheff
- Oakley Bull as Daisy Sheff
- Kaitlyn Dever as Lauren
- LisaGay Hamilton as Rose
- Timothy Hutton as Dr. Brown
- Andre Royo as Spencer
- Amy Ryan as Vicki Sheff
- Amy Forsyth as Diane
- Ricky Low as Destiny
- Stefanie Scott as Julia

== Production ==
In 2008, it was announced that Paramount Pictures and Plan B Entertainment had acquired film rights to the books Beautiful Boy: A Father's Journey Through His Son's Addiction by David Sheff and Tweak: Growing Up on Methamphetamines by his son Nic. Both books are about Nic's addiction and eventual recovery. The studio and producers announced that they would use the recently published books to frame a picture about drug addiction, from the perspective of both a young methamphetamine addict and the father who finds himself helpless to stop his son's downward spiral. In 2011, it was announced that writer and director Cameron Crowe had written a script based on the books. In 2012, TheWrap reported that Crowe was looking to direct the film from his own script after wrapping his romantic film Aloha, with New Regency becoming involved in the project after Paramount dropped out. In December 2013, it was reported that Mark Wahlberg was circling the role of David Sheff, with Crowe still attached to direct.

In 2015, Variety announced that Belgian director Felix van Groeningen had taken over as director, with a new script written by Australian writer Luke Davies. In January 2017, it was reported that Steve Carell and Will Poulter were attached to star in the project, as the father and son, respectively. Dede Gardner, Jeremy Kleiner and Brad Pitt were the main producers. In February 2017, Timothée Chalamet was officially cast in the film as Nic Sheff, opposite Carell as his character's father. In 2018, Van Groeningen said that out of more than 200 tapes he received from actors auditioning for the role of Nic, Chalamet immediately stood out. He added, "While we deliberately did not choose a [well-known actor] at the time of the auditions... there is less burden, now of course, it's great... Nobody had foreseen that he would suddenly become world-famous, but it is completely deserved. If [his fame] can help bring young people to the cinema, I can only applaud it." In March 2017, Amy Ryan, Maura Tierney, Kaitlyn Dever, Timothy Hutton, and LisaGay Hamilton joined the cast of the film. This marked a return for Carell and Ryan starring together—and as an on-screen couple—since season 7 of The Office. In April 2017, Andre Royo joined as well. Prior to filming, Van Groeningen arranged for two weeks of rehearsals with the cast—a common practice in productions in his native Belgium, but not in Hollywood.

=== Filming ===
Principal photography began on March 27, 2017, and lasted through May 2017 in and around Los Angeles and San Francisco. Production designer Ethan Tobman used the house from the TV series Big Little Lies as a set, to which he made numerous alterations including to the counters.

The first scenes shot for the film were the most intense, according to Van Groeningen, and involved Chalamet's character being hospitalized for a drug overdose. Chalamet was instructed to lose weight a couple of weeks before the filming of the "hospitalization scenes", and subsequently rested to recover in order to complete the rest of the shoot. Chalamet has stated that there were numerous "doctor visits" and "close calls" during the shoot, saying, "your mind knows you're acting. But when you drop twenty pounds and you are under a rain machine for eight takes in a T-shirt—your body doesn't know you're acting."

The editing of the film took seven months in total, during which the movie was completely recut multiple times. Initially, Nico Leunen, Van Groeningen's long-time collaborator, was not involved in the project; however, Van Groeningen became dissatisfied with the editing process and brought Leunen to Los Angeles to reconstruct the film.

== Release ==
Beautiful Boy had its world premiere at the Toronto International Film Festival on September 7, 2018, with the cast and director in attendance, along with David and Nic Sheff making a surprise appearance after the premiere. The film was theatrically released in the United States on October 12, 2018, and was released in the United Kingdom on January 18, 2019. The film was made available to stream on Prime Video on January 3, 2019.

== Reception ==
=== Critical response ===
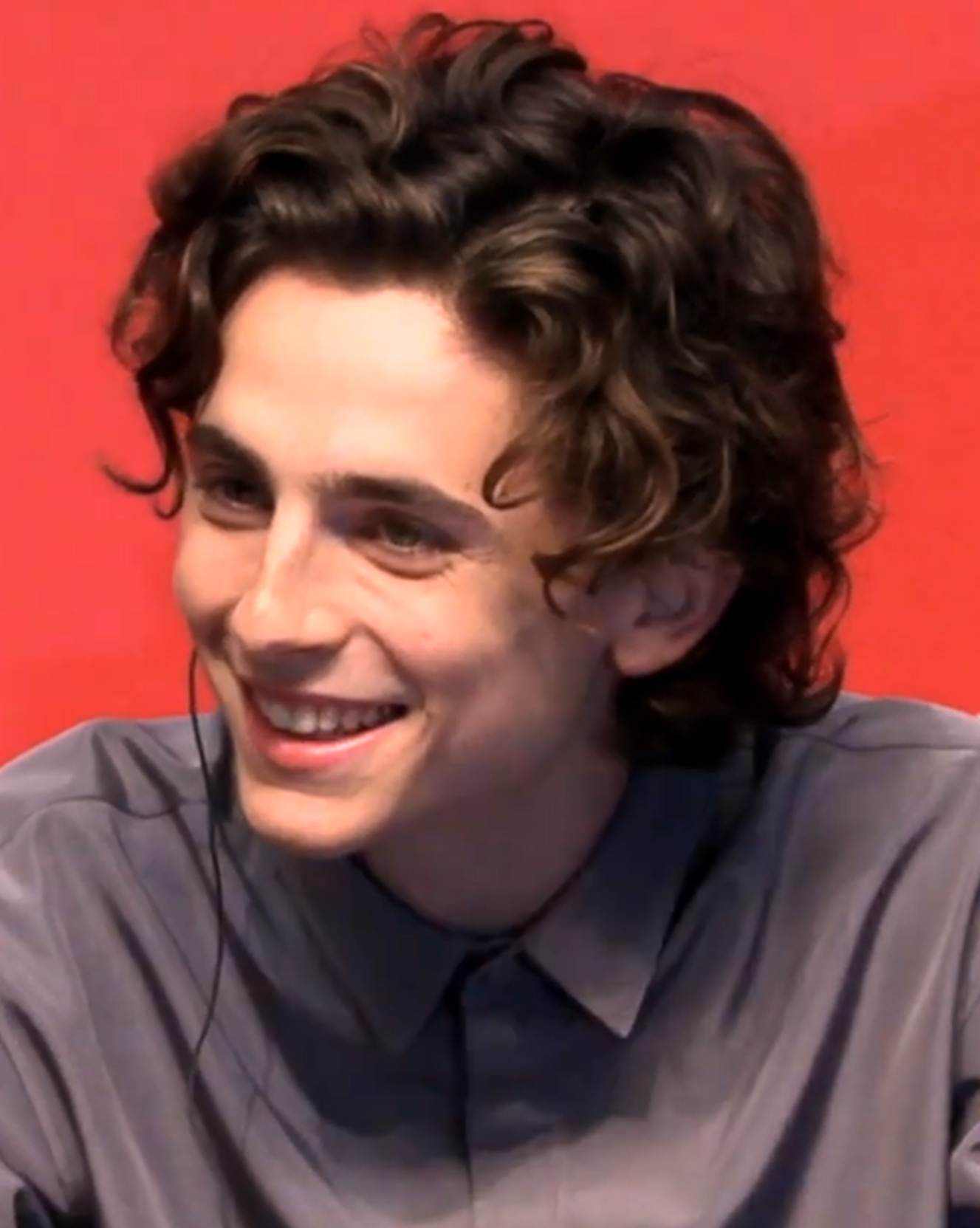
Timothée Chalamet's performance garnered critical praise and he received his second Golden Globe Award and Screen Actors Guild Award nominations and his third BAFTA Award nomination.

On Rotten Tomatoes, the film has an approval rating of 67% based on 264 reviews. The website's critical consensus reads: "Beautiful Boy sees Timothée Chalamet and Steve Carell delivering showcase work that's often powerful enough to make up for the story's muted emotional impact." On Metacritic, the film has a weighted average score of 62 out of 100, based on 45 critics, indicating "generally favorable reviews".

Reviewers praised the central performances but criticized elements of the film's structure and pacing. Christy Lemire of RogerEbert.com praised the performances by Carell and Chalamet, while arguing that the nonlinear narrative detracted from the actors' work. Steve Pond of TheWrap similarly praised both actors while criticizing the film's length.

=== Accolades ===
Award	Date of ceremony	Category	Recipients	Result	Ref(s)
Adelaide Film Festival	October 21, 2018	International Feature Award	Beautiful Boy	Nominated	
Aspen Film Festival	September 30, 2018	Independent by Nature Award	Felix van Groeningen	Won	
British Academy Film Awards	February 10, 2019	Best Actor in a Supporting Role	Timothée Chalamet	Nominated	
Chicago International Film Festival	October 19, 2018	Founder's Award	Beautiful Boy	Won	
Critics' Choice Awards	January 13, 2019	Best Supporting Actor	Timothée Chalamet	Nominated	
Film Fest Gent	October 19, 2018	North Sea Port Audience Award	Beautiful Boy	5th place	
Golden Globe Awards	January 6, 2019	Best Supporting Actor – Motion Picture	Timothée Chalamet	Nominated	
Hollywood Film Awards	November 4, 2018	Hollywood Supporting Actor Award	Timothée Chalamet	Won	
Hollywood Film Awards	November 4, 2018	Hollywood Breakthrough Director Award	Felix van Groeningen	Won	
San Diego Film Critics Society	December 10, 2018	Best Male Supporting Actor	Timothée Chalamet	Won	
San Sebastián International Film Festival	September 29, 2018	Golden Shell	Beautiful Boy	Nominated	
Satellite Awards	February 17, 2019	Best Supporting Actor – Motion Picture	Timothée Chalamet	Nominated	
Screen Actors Guild Awards	January 27, 2019	Outstanding Performance by a Male Actor in a Supporting Role	Timothée Chalamet	Nominated	
Toronto International Film Festival	September 16, 2018	Grolsch People's Choice Award	Beautiful Boy	Nominated	

== See also ==
- The Basketball Diaries (film)
- Ben Is Back
- Four Good Days
