= VideoGames & Computer Entertainment =

American video game magazine

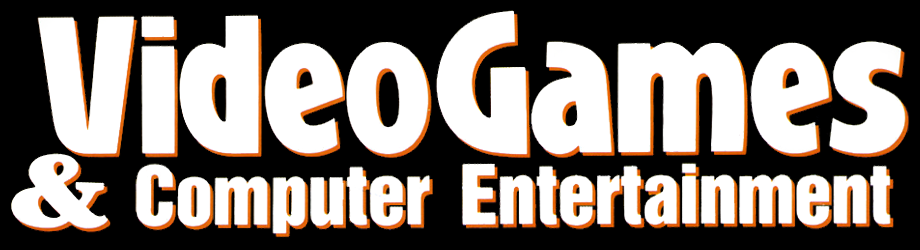

- Executive Editor: Andy Eddy
- Associate Editors: Chris Bieniek, Mike Dávila, Clayton Walnum (freelance editor)
- Categories: Video Games
- Frequency: bi-monthly: Dec. 1988-Feb. 1989 monthly: from April 1989
- Format: 28 cm
- Publisher: L.F.P., Inc.
- First issue: December 1988
- Final issue: September 1996
- Country: USA
- Based in: 9171 Wilshire Blvd., Suite 300, Beverly Hills, CA 90210
- Language: English language
- ISSN: 1059-2938
- OCLC: 25300986

VideoGames & Computer Entertainment (abbreviated as VG&CE) was an American magazine dedicated to covering video games on computers, home consoles and arcades. It was published by LFP, Inc. from the late 1988 until the mid-1990s. Offering game reviews, previews, game strategies and cheat codes as well as coverage of the general industry, VG&CE was also one of the first magazines to cover both home console and computer games. The magazine gave out annual awards in a variety of categories, divided between the best of home video games and computer video games. The magazine featured original artwork by Alan Hunter and other freelance artists.

== History ==
VG&CE began as a spinoff of ANALOG Computing, a magazine published by LFP devoted to Atari 8-bit computers.

VG&CE was started at LFP by Lee H. Pappas (publisher), with Andy Eddy as executive editor (Eddy was a freelance contributor to the first issue of the magazine, which had the cover date of December 1988, just before relocating to California in September 1988 to become its editor before the first issue hit the streets. During Eddy's tenure at the magazine, there was no one listed as editor-in-chief, simply due to odd staff-titling decisions.) Contributors included Arnie Katz and Bill "The Game Doctor" Kunkel, co-founders of the first video game magazine, Electronic Games. Tips & Tricks editor-in-chief Chris Bieniek was an associate editor at VG&CE. Computer Player editor-in-chief Mike Davila was an associate editor and later executive editor at VG&CE. Knights of Xentar writer David Moskowitz was also an associate editor covering news and computer games during the Eddy/Davila/Bieniek tenure.

=== VideoGames - The Ultimate Gaming Magazine ===
VideoGames, April 1995

The magazine was renamed into VideoGames - The Ultimate Gaming Magazine starting with the September 1993 issue and dropped computer game coverage. In an effort to compete with magazines popular at the time, such as GamePro, the magazine was made more child-friendly with vibrant colors. Issues often featured a videogame cheat printed on the cover, labelled as a "free code;" this ended in late 1994. For much of this era, Chris Gore was editor-in-chief, and it had a monthly news and gossip column "The Gore Score". The magazine ended publication in late 1996, when Ziff-Davis bought VideoGames from LFP and folded the brand.

== Spin-off magazines ==
VG&CE spun off several other video game magazines:

- TurboPlay (June/July 1990-August/September 1992), a bi-monthly magazine dedicated to covering TurboGrafx-16 hardware and software.
- Tips & Tricks (February 1995-August 2007), a game magazine dedicated to game strategies and cheat codes. The magazine concept was spun out of the "Easter Egg Hunt" and "Tips & Tricks" sections in VG&CE, which offered extensive codes and cheats for video games, as well as the "walkthrough" strategies that VG&CE also provided.

== Reception ==
Time Extension wrote: "[...] VG&CE was staffed by seasoned veterans who wanted to dig deeper and deliver 'think pieces' about the state of the industry. While this helped to separate the magazine from the more hyperbolic EGM and GamePro, it didn't do much for sales."
