= Piglet (novel) =

2024 novel by Lottie Hazell

Piglet is a novel by Lottie Hazell published in 2024.

== Premise ==
Piglet explores the themes of aspiration, control and appetite. The novel explores the story of the character Piglet using food as a medium, as her wedding day to Kit approaches. "Piglet" is her childhood nickname, and she now works as a cookbook editor in London. Piglet lives an ordinary middle-class existence in Oxford while Kit is the beloved son of a wealthy couple who love her despite their different social class and have spent a lot of money on the wedding. Piglet was given her nickname as she was described as her parents' "daughter who ate," and she is now dieting to fit into the white dress she wants to wear. As the wedding day gets closer, her fiancé reveals a betrayal and she turns to food to repress growing rage.

== Development and release ==
Bobby Mostyn-Owen, commissioning editor at Doubleday, acquired the UK and Commonwealth rights (excluding Canada) in 2022 for the novel Piglet from Lottie Hazell, from Harriet Moore at David Higham Associates, to be published in early 2024. This was the debut novel for Hazell. The novel was published by Doubleday on January 25, 2024. The book was also released on Penguin Audio, at a duration of 7 hours, 35 minutes. The audio book was narrated by Rebekah Hinds. Piglet was published in the US by Henry Holt and Company.

== Reception ==
Alex Clark reviewed the audio book of Piglet for Financial Times and said that "I thoroughly enjoyed Lottie Hazell's debut Piglet, though it helps if you have a natural inclination to listen to step-by-step instructions for assembling a croquembouche or making the perfect puttanesca." Aine Toner for the Belfast Telegraph called the book "such an interesting, clever read." The reviewer for Publishers Weekly stated that "Hazell debuts with the delicious narrative of a disastrous wedding." Laura Hackett for The Times said that the novel "understands just how connected culinary and literary pleasures are. It's no surprise: Hazell has a PhD in food writing in 21st-century fiction. Where her book excels is in showing how class is implicated in every food choice we make."

Sarah Gilmartin for The Irish Times praised Hazell saying, "To give due credit to Hazell, that is no small feat for a debut author. A writer, contemporary literature scholar and board game designer, she holds a practice-based PhD from Loughborough University, where her research considered subversive femininity in 21st century fiction with a particular interest in the domestic, food writing and trauma narratives. She has previously worked in cookbook marketing, which she uses to fine effect in her fiction with evocative, unusual descriptions of food and dining." Annie Cunningham for Irish Independent said that "Hazell has much to say about our food-obsessed snobbery and she plates up a deliciously-written narrative, generously peppered with lethal ground glass." Marjorie Brennan for the Irish Examiner said that "There are interesting themes to be teased out in this book — class, friendship, the distinctly modern obsession with food, the social media-driven pressure to present one's perfect self to the world — but ultimately Hazell struggles to weave them together in a coherent way. Hazell has a masters in creative writing so there is no doubt she can write, but her academic background could be the reason that the narrative can appear overworked and effortful."

Annie Bostrom for Booklist said that "While characters and their motivations are sometimes just out of reach, Piglet excels in its crisp dialogue and Hazell's glorious descriptions of Piglet's cooking and the foods she hungers for." Ben East for The Guardian wrote that "There's a searing section in Hazell's nuanced debut where the deliciously unlikable titular protagonist realises her carefully curated life as a thirtysomething gourmand is a pretence, her pleasures mere posture. The fact that she does so on her wedding day gives Piglet its page-turning narrative propulsion. But actually, in picking apart this irritatingly smug couple, Hazell gradually offers wry, thoughtful explanations for their behaviour, covering class, female identity and family. Piglet's clarity is hard won, but Hazell's gift is to make it feel like a punch-the-air moment rather than a told-you-so." Jennifer Weiner for The New York Times wrote that "Hazell's prose is as tart and icy as lemon sorbet; her sentences are whipcord taut, drum tight. The only time she indulges in description is when Piglet's cooking or eating. Then, the writing becomes lush and lavish, with mouthwatering descriptions of 'new potatoes, boiled and dotted with a bright salsa verde'." A reviewer for The New Yorker stated that "Newly installed in a house in Oxford, the protagonist of this novel savors visions of a future with her well-to-do fiancé. To her relief, they are a world away from her family in Derby, for whom she feels “a crawling embarrassment,” and from whom she received the nickname Piglet, for her prodigious appetite."

Sarah Hashimoto for AudioFile said that "Narrator Rebekah Hinds imbues Hazell's compelling debut with a palpable sense of dread. ... Hinds's depiction of Piglet's frantic appetite is piercing, capturing her insatiable need for the lushly described food. This is a listen like slightly burnt caramel—sharp and dark, yet still luscious." Georgie Gordon for The Sydney Morning Herald said described the novel as a "taut tale of a woman on the brink" which is "Simmering with suspense and culinary descriptions that leave you ravenous." Agata Popęda for Monterey County Weekly noted that "Hazell has a lot of experience as a food writer, so her food descriptions will make you hungry. Hilarious, delicious and dark." Danielle Webb for The Globe and Mail stated: "Reader beware: Hazell makes some narrative decisions that keep important details undisclosed. Still, it's a worthy read. Come for the mouth-watering food descriptions, stay for the smart commentary on female ambition, desire and class dynamics."

A reviewer for The Irish Times appreciated the "vivid and visceral approach" of Piglet, and that on the cover is "a greasy, decadent burger – tells you immediately that you’re in for something indulgent and messy," noting how the appetite of the protagonist is "the engine that drives the narrative forward" where she "finds herself at the edge of a carefully curated life with ravenous, unfulfilled hunger. The story takes readers through her descent into pure indulgence as her impending marriage dissolves days before the wedding. Piglet dives headlong into excess, feasting on everything, tangible emotions spilling from her psyche. Hazell doesn't just write about food; she writes with food. The imagery is tactile and lavish as if Piglet's turmoil is seasoning itself." Rachel Flynn and Lizz Schumer for People called it "A fresh take on hunger, class and the weight of expectations." Daisy Lester for The Independent said that "Lottie Hazell's searing debut challenges the notion of domestic bliss. Kit and Piglet (a derisive nickname from childhood) are the picture-perfect couple. They own a new-build home, have seemingly successful careers and are planning their wedding that's straight out of a brochure."
