= Beautiful Boy: A Father's Journey Through His Son's Addiction =

2008 memoir by David Sheff

- Cover of Beautiful Boy: A Father's Journey Through His Son's Addiction
- Author: David Sheff
- Language: English
- Publisher: Houghton Mifflin
- Publication date: February 26, 2008
- Publication place: United States
- Media type: Hardcover
- Pages: 326
- ISBN: 978-0-618-68335-2
- OCLC: 71005844
- Dewey Decimal: 362.29/9 B 22
- LC Class: HV5831.C2 S54 2008

Beautiful Boy: A Father's Journey Through His Son's Addiction is a memoir by David Sheff that describes how his family dealt with his son Nic's methamphetamine addiction. It was published by Houghton Mifflin on February 26, 2008. The book grew out of the article "My Addicted Son" that Sheff had written for The New York Times Magazine in 2005. Son Nic Sheff's perspective was told in his own memoir Tweak: Growing Up on Methamphetamines, published concurrently by an imprint of Simon & Schuster.

== Content ==
Beautiful Boy covers a substantial portion of Nic's life and deals with the elder Sheff's struggles of how to respond to a son whom he loves but who is also a danger to his family. Nic, then a senior in high school, steals money from his younger siblings and gets arrested for possession in front of them, leading Sheff to install a security system to prevent Nic from breaking in. Nic attends many rehabs throughout the memoir, but relapses many times. The longest stretch of sobriety Nic had, prior to his last relapse in the memoir, was almost two years. He then relapsed once again and went into treatment. By the end of the memoir Sheff tells us that Nic has been sober one year. He hopes with all his heart that this will be the last time, and believes in him once again. But in his mind he knows that a relapse can easily happen again and that it will be very difficult for Nic, his family, and himself. Another theme throughout the memoir is Sheff wondering about how much he is to blame and what he could have done to prevent his son's addiction.

Throughout the memoir Sheff attends numerous Al-Anon Meetings and therapy sessions. In these different sessions he is continually told of the three Cs: you did not cause it, you cannot control it, and you cannot cure it. Sheff has a difficult time accepting these statements throughout the memoir. At the end, however, he says that he has come to accept two of the Cs: he cannot control it, and cannot cure it. He realizes that he has done everything he can do to try to help Nic, and knows that it is up to Nic to figure things out if he is to fully recover.

== Reception ==
Beautiful Boy became a critical and commercial success. It reached #1 on the New York Times Best Sellers List on April 6, 2008, and again on May 4, 2008. Entertainment Weekly named it the #1 Best Nonfiction Book of 2008, and it won the Barnes & Noble Discover Great New Writers Award for nonfiction in 2008. Amazon.com selected it as one of the "Best Books of 2008", and Starbucks picked it as one of the few books it would sell in its coffee shops.

== Tweak: Growing Up on Methamphetamines ==
Tweak: Growing Up on Methamphetamines is a follow-up book and autobiographical memoir written by the son Nic Sheff personally about his own ordeal. It was published as hardcover by Atheneum Books for Young Readers in 336 pages in February 2008 (ISBN 9781416913627) and later in paperback on January 6, 2009. It became a New York Times and USA Today bestselling memoir in its own right.

Nic also wrote his follow-up book We All Fall Down: Living with Addiction in 2011.

== Film adaptation ==
A film adaptation directed by Felix van Groeningen, and starring Steve Carell as David Sheff and Timothée Chalamet as Nic Sheff, was released on October 12, 2018, by Amazon Studios. It is based on both books Beautiful Boy: A Father's Journey Through His Son's Addiction by David Sheff and Tweak: Growing Up on Methamphetamines by Nic Sheff. The screenplay was adapted from the books by Luke Davies and director Felix van Groeningen.
