= Lottie Hazell =

British writer

Lottie Hazell is a British writer and board game designer. Her debut novel Piglet was published in 2024.

== Early life and education ==
She graduated from Loughborough University, where she earned a practice-based PhD focused on 21st century fiction involving subversive femininity including narratives on domestic, food writing and trauma.

Hazell also has a Masters in creative writing.

== Career ==
Hazell has worked as a writer, contemporary literature scholar and board game designer who has also worked in cookbook marketing.

In 2022, Doubleday acquired the rights to publish Hazell's debut novel Piglet in 2024. Piglet was a Grazia Book Club pick and shortlisted for the Barnes & Noble Discover Prize.

Hazell is reuniting with Doubleday for the publication of her second novel Mothersick.

Her work has appeared in Vogue and Women's Prize for Fiction.

== Works ==
- Hazell, Lottie (2024-01-25). Piglet. London: Doubleday UK. ISBN 978-0-85752-956-5.
