= Maggie; Or, a Man and a Woman Walk Into a Bar =

2025 novel by Katie Yee

- First edition cover
- Author: Katie Yee
- Publisher: Summit Books
- Publication date: July 22, 2025
- ISBN: 978-1-668-08421-2

Maggie; Or, a Man and a Woman Walk Into a Bar is a 2025 novel by Katie Yee. The novel is Yee's professional debut.

== Synopsis ==
Shortly after discovering her husband's affair, a nameless protagonist discovers that she has been diagnosed with cancer. Naming the tumor "Maggie" after her husband's affair partner, she starts to rediscover her Chinese American heritage in her search for healing.

== Development ==
Yee began writing Maggie after considering "how strange it is to have a body" and moments in life that force people to connect with their bodies.

=== Publication history ===
Maggie was published in the United States by Summit Books on July 22, 2025.

== Reception ==
Maggie received positive reception from critics upon release. The Times positively compared Maggie to Nora Ephron's 1983 novel Heartburn, specifically highlighting the writing's "resentment-tinged wit." The Minnesota Star Tribune was also positive, noting that the writing had a "jazzy flow" and describing the novel as "almost timeless."

The Washington Post published a more mixed review, offering praise to the book's prose for its ease of reading but criticizing the "freakishly well" behavior of the characters and the general lack of conflict. Publishers Weekly described the novel's pace as "sedate" but complimented the prose and Yee's empathetic approach to her characters. Kirkus Reviews, in a starred review, praised the book's storytelling and comedy, while Booklist positively described the novel's message of hope.
