= Birmingham–Southern College =

Methodist university in Birmingham, Alabama, US (1856–2024)

Coordinates: 33.515°N 86.853°W

- Former names: Southern University (1856–1918); Birmingham College (1898–1918)
- Motto: Pro Christo et Republica (Latin)
- Type: Private liberal arts college
- Active: 1856; 170 years ago (predecessor); May 30, 1918; 108 years ago (current institution)–May 31, 2024; 2 years ago
- Affiliations: SAA (NCAA Division III)
- President: Daniel B. Coleman
- Undergraduates: 975
- Location: Birmingham, Alabama, United States
- Campus: Urban
- Colors: Black and Gold
- Nickname: Panthers
- Mascot: Rowdy
- Website: www.bsc.edu
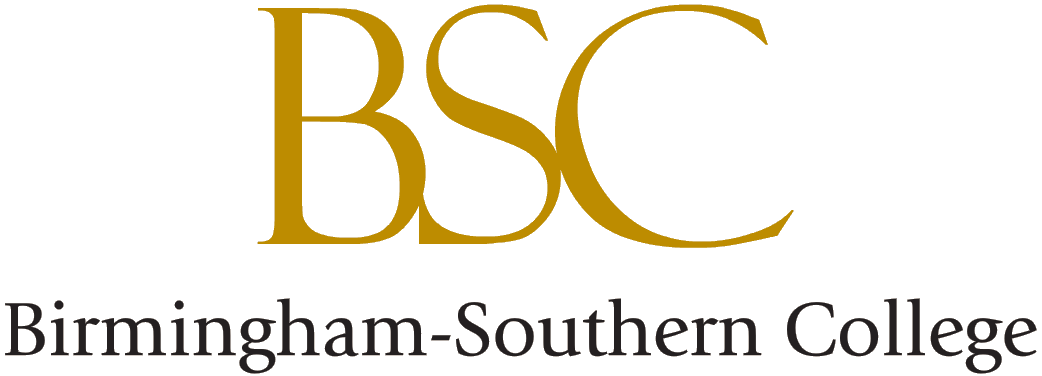

Birmingham–Southern College (BSC) was a private liberal arts college in Birmingham, Alabama. Founded in 1856, the college was affiliated with the United Methodist Church and was accredited by the Southern Association of Colleges and Schools (SACS). The college's student body was approximately 975 students when it closed at the end of the 2023–24 school year after years of financial trouble.

== History ==
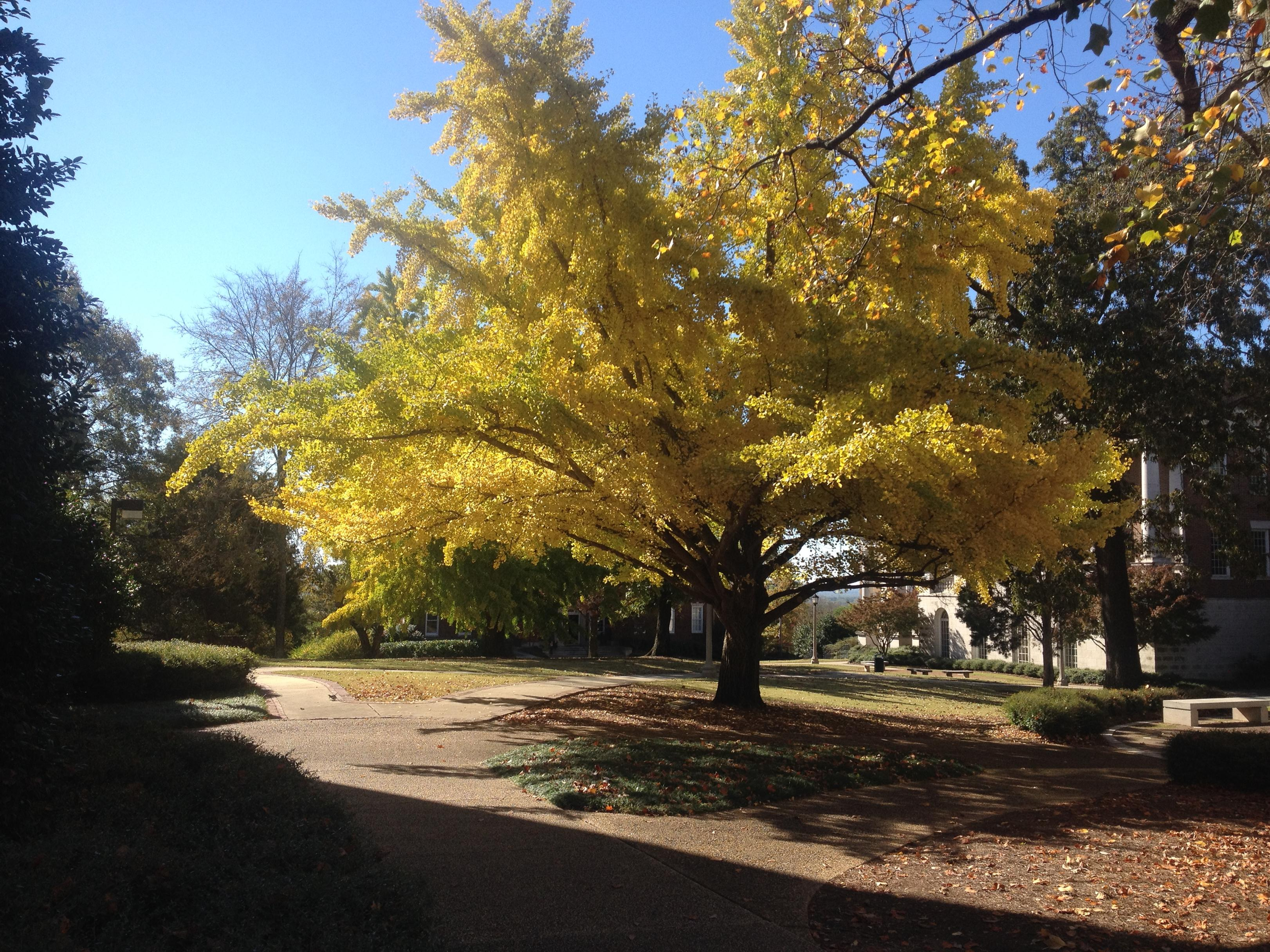
Ginkgo Tree by Munger Hall

Birmingham–Southern College was the result of a 1918 merger of Southern University, founded in Greensboro, Alabama in 1856, with Birmingham College, opened in 1898 in Birmingham, Alabama. These two institutions were consolidated on May 30, 1918, under the name of Birmingham–Southern College. Phi Beta Kappa recognized Birmingham–Southern in 1937, establishing the Alabama Beta chapter.

In the 21st century, the school suffered from financial troubles, due to errors in accounting and dwindling enrollment. Although the school explored many avenues to keep the school open, including seeking assistance from the Alabama legislature, the school's board of trustees voted to close the college at the end of the 2023–24 school year, May 31, 2024.

== Academics ==
The college offered five bachelor's degrees in more than 50 programs of study, as well as interdisciplinary and individualized majors and dual-degree programs.

== Campus ==
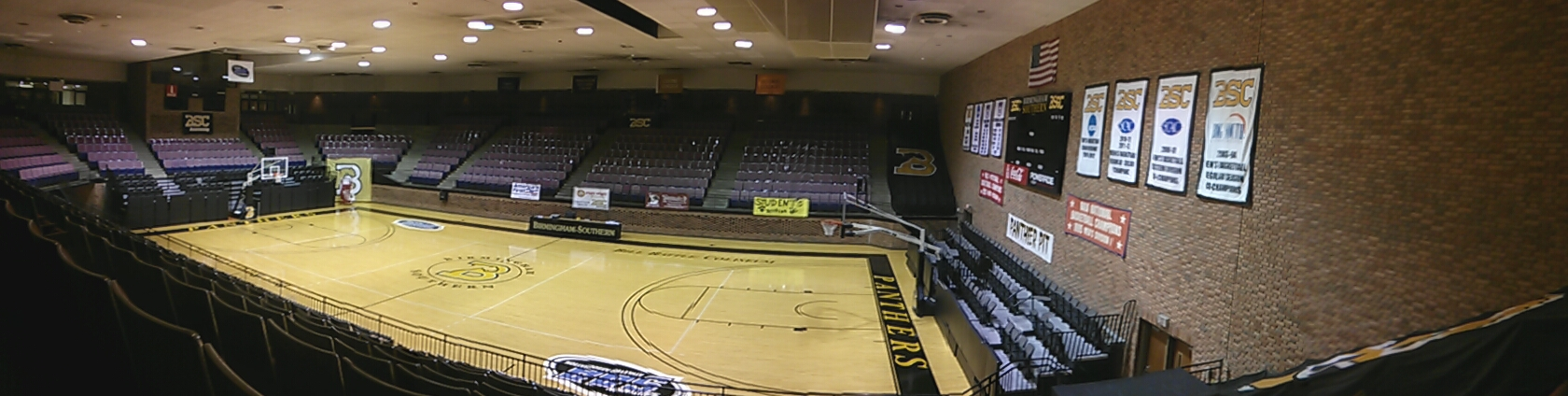
Bill Battle Coliseum, the home court of Birmingham-Southern women's volleyball team, and the women's and men's basketball teams

The campus was situated on 192 wooded acres three miles west of downtown Birmingham. The college had 45 academic, residential, administrative, and athletics buildings/facilities. The campus has been for sale since spring 2024. In September 2024, BSC entered into an agreement to sell the campus to Miles College, but after repeated extensions, BSC ended that agreement in November 2024.

The campus was sold to the Department of Homeland Security for $126.5 million to become the Enlisted Training Center of Excellence for the U.S. Coast Guard. The Coast Guard Training Center Birmingham-Southern opened on June 5, 2026. The Coast Guard promises to continue to honor the name and traditions - including logos and mascots at the campus.

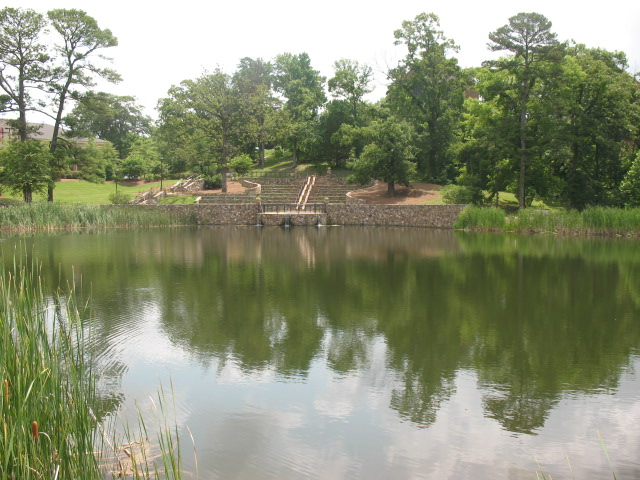
Urban Environmental Park

== Athletics ==
The Birmingham–Southern athletic teams were called the Panthers. The college was part of Division III of the National Collegiate Athletic Association (NCAA), primarily competing in the Southern Athletic Association (SAA) since the 2012–13 academic year. The Panthers previously competed in the D-III Southern Collegiate Athletic Conference (SCAC) from 2006–07 to 2011–12; in the Big South Conference within NCAA Division I from 2001–02 to 2005–06; and in the TranSouth Athletic Conference (TranSouth or TSAC) of the National Association of Intercollegiate Athletics (NAIA) from 1996–97 to 2000–01.

Birmingham–Southern competed in 22 intercollegiate varsity sports: men's sports included baseball, basketball, cross country, football, golf, lacrosse, soccer, swimming, tennis and track & field (indoor and outdoor); while women's sports included basketball, cross country, golf, lacrosse, soccer, softball, swimming, tennis, track & field and volleyball.

The baseball team was 13–10 in the middle of the 2024 season prior to the announcement of closure at the end of the season. They proceeded to go 19–4 and win the super regionals of the 2024 NCAA tournament to advance as one of the final eight teams in the NCAA Division III World Series; the series started on May 31, the day of the closure of the school.

== Notable alumni ==
- William Acker – United States district judge
- Robert Aderholt – United States congressman from Alabama (1997–present)
- Tyner Rushing — actress
- Laurie C. Battle – United States congressman from Alabama (1947–1955)
- Amanda Bearse – actress, best known for her role as Marcy on the television sitcom Married... with Children.
- Richmond C. Beatty (BA 1926) – academic, biographer and critic
- Harvie Branscomb – Chancellor, Vanderbilt University (1946–1963)
- Lewis C. Branscomb (1865–1930) – Methodist minister
- Charles Brooks – Editorial cartoonist
- Pat Buttram – Actor (sidekick of Gene Autry in films, and Mr. Haney in the TV series Green Acres)
- Miles Copeland III – Music and entertainment executive, former manager of The Police and cofounder of I.R.S. Records
- Howard Cruse – Cartoonist
- Charles Gaines – Author, journalist, screenwriter, editor; Cine Gold Eagle Awards, National Academy of Television Arts and Sciences Emmy Award
- Alexander Gelman – Theatre Director, Organic Theater Company, Chicago
- Randall Goodgame – Christian singer/songwriter
- Rebecca Gilman – American playwright
- Jennifer Hale – Voice actress
- Walker Hayes – Country singer/songwriter
- Donald Heflin – American diplomat
- Howell Heflin – U.S. Senator from Alabama (1978–1997)
- Perry O. Hooper, Sr. – 27th Chief Justice of the Alabama Supreme Court
- Alexa Jones – former Miss Alabama and news reporter
- Caitlín R. Kiernan – Paleontologist and fiction aithor
- Hugh Martin – Broadway and film composer and arranger, including movie musical Meet Me In St. Louis, starring Judy Garland.
- Walter P. McConaughy – Career diplomat and US Ambassador to Burma, South Korea, Pakistan, and Taiwan.
- Bucky McMillan – Head coach, Texas A&M men's basketball
- Morgan Murphy – Food critic and author
- Joe Nasco – Professional footballer
- Sena Jeter Naslund – Author
- LaFayette L. Patterson – United States congressman from Alabama (1928-1933)
- Gin Phillips – Novelist
- Howell Raines – Executive editor, The New York Times (2001–2004); Pulitzer Prize for Feature Writing, 1992
- Ray Reach – Jazz pianist, vocalist, arranger, composer, producer and educator. Director of Student Jazz Programs at the Alabama Jazz Hall of Fame.
- Glenn Shadix – American actor
- Daryl Shore – Professional soccer player and coach
- Morgan Smith-Goodwin – Actress, the "Wendy's Girl" in TV commercials for Wendy's restaurants
- Elton Bryson Stephens Sr. – businessman who founded EBSCO Industries
- Larry Striplin – college basketball coach and businessman
- Luther Leonidas Terry – Surgeon General of the United States (1961–1965)
- Butch Thompson – college baseball coach
- Martin Waldron (1925–1981) – Winner of the 1964 Pulitzer Prize for Public Service
- Ray Wedgeworth – college basketball, football, and baseball coach
- Frederick Palmer Whiddon – President, University of South Alabama (1963–1998)
- Robert Lee Williams – 3rd Governor of Oklahoma (1915–1919)
- John H. Yardley – Pathologist
- Edward L. Norton – central banker
