= Firmin: Adventures of a Metropolitan Lowlife =

2006 novel by Sam Savage

- Cover of "Firmin"
- Author: Sam Savage
- Cover artist: Michael Mikolowski
- Language: English
- Genre: Magical Realism
- Publisher: Coffee House Press
- Publication date: May 31, 2006
- Publication place: United States
- Media type: Print (Hardcover, Paperback)
- Pages: 288
- ISBN: 978-1-56689-181-3

Firmin: Adventures of a Metropolitan Lowlife (2006) is the second novel by author Sam Savage, about a rat runt in 1960s Boston who learns to read. In 2006 Coffee House Press published Firmin: Adventures of a Metropolitan Lowlife. In 2007 the Spanish publishing house Seix Barral purchased the world rights to Firmin, including English-language rights. The novel subsequently became a bestseller in Europe.

== Plot summary ==
Firmin is an autobiography of a rat born, "with my eyes wide open", as the 13th child to an alcoholic mother rat with 12 nipples in the basement of a Boston bookshop in Scollay Square on November 9, 1960. As a result, Firmin the runt puts off the pangs of hunger by consuming Finnegans Wake, his initial bedding, and acquires the ability to read and think symbolically.

Initially, Firmin reads voraciously, but over time his tastes (literally and metaphorically) become more refined. But as Firmin's dreams of literature increase, his associations with his rattus society decreases proportionally. Firmin becomes attracted to strippers and characters in pornographic films in a local cinema instead of his own species, becoming a "pervert and a freak". Eventually, his family moves away from the bookshop, leaving Firmin alone, convinced that he is mad but harmless.

Falling into an existential malaise, Firmin finds his own form ugly and avoids his own reflection. He tries to leave messages to the owner of the bookshop from whom he desires friendship but being unable to speak his attempts lead to a tragedy where he is almost killed by poison. Lonely and desperate, he attempts to learn sign language, but is only to express the words "Good-bye" and "Zipper" (due to the limitations of his paws). He is attacked as he tries to communicate with humans in a local park.

Firmin is then caught at the park by an alcoholic science fiction author and bohemian political radical, Jerry Magoon, who had written about alien intelligent rats in the past. The author treats Firmin kindly, and even when he catches Firmin reading, he seems to think that the rat is just mimicking human behaviour, even to the extent when Firmin plays a toy piano.

However, when the author suffers a stroke and is hospitalised, Firmin must venture into the world again, but this time Scollay Square is in the midst of being renovated - meaning that all of Firmin's old haunts are being emptied or knocked down. Old and hallucinating, Firmin dreams of a conversation with Ginger Rogers, where he has to come to terms with his own mortality, just as Scollay Square is reaching the end of its life. In his final moments, Firmin finds the basement of the bookstore where he was born, and even the original bedding of the shreds of Finnegans Wake and has his last taste of literature.

== Reception ==
Tim Martin in The Telegraph notes that in Italy "that La Repubblica felt able to begin a recent article with the words: 'By now everyone must know Firmino, or have heard of him' ("Ormai tutti conoscono o hanno sentito parlare di Firmino", and Josh Lacey in The Guardian describes the book as providing "a wonderful celebration of the way reading enriches your life".

Firmin placed third for the 2006 Barnes & Noble Discover Great New Writers Award for Fiction.
