= The Diver's Clothes Lie Empty =

2015 novel by Vendela Vida

- Book cover
- Author: Vendela Vida
- Language: English
- Genre: Literary fiction Psychological thriller
- Set in: Casablanca
- Publisher: Ecco Press
- Publication date: 2015
- Pages: 224
- ISBN: 9780062110916

The Diver's Clothes Lie Empty is a 2015 psychological thriller novel by Vendela Vida. Set in Morocco and using second-person narration, the story follows an unnamed American woman who assumes a series of shifting identities after her belongings are stolen upon arrival in Casablanca.

== Plot ==
The novel is narrated in second person, using the pronoun "you" throughout. The protagonist, an unnamed 33-year-old woman, is in the process of divorcing. She has recently served as a surrogate for her fraternal twin sister with infertility problems, giving birth to her niece Reeves Conway. Shortly after the birth, her sister confesses that she has been having an affair with the protagonist's husband.

The protagonist takes a trip from Florida to Morocco, attempting to recover from these recent events. On the flight to Casablanca, the protagonist recognizes one of her fellow passengers. Upon arrival, her backpack—with her passport, laptop, wallet, credit cards, and camera—is stolen from the hotel lobby. She cancels her credit cards and reports the theft to the chief of police, lying that she is a travel writer for The New York Times.

The next day, the police chief gives her a different backpack that contains a wallet, credit cards, and the passport of a woman named Sabine Alyse. Suspicious of a conspiracy between the police and the hotel staff, and feeling pressured to accept the backpack, the protagonist signs a document with Sabine's name, assuming her identity. She later cuts her hair to resemble Sabine.

Using Sabine's credit card, the protagonist moves into the Regency, a fancier hotel in Casablanca. She visits the U.S. embassy to report her passport stolen, but discovers that she has lost the police document and gives another false name to the embassy official.

Returning to the Regency, the protagonist stumbles upon the production of a film called A Different Door starring a famous American actress. The actress' stand-in suddenly departs due to an affair with the film's director. The production team offers the protagonist (who introduces herself as Reeves Conway) a job as the actress' new stand-in due to their resemblance.

The protagonist begins work, blocking two scenes at a house in an upscale Casablanca neighborhood. That night, she confides in the actress about the events of her stay in Morocco and reveals that Reeves is not her real name. After the next day's shoot—a scene stuck in traffic—the actress invites her to the Jazzablanca festival. The actress leaves the concert early after being recognized, and the protagonist meets the actress' friend Patti Smith backstage.

On the protagonist's third day of work, the actress asks her to attend dinner with Leopoldi, a Russian businessman the actress once dated. The protagonist blocks a scene at a mosque where the actress must cry while praying. Thinking of her niece's birth, the protagonist cries during the scene, earning praise from the director.

The protagonist wears the actress' dress and the wig she uses on set to dinner with Leopoldi. She enjoys their evening together, but becomes drunk after they have a nightcap. A photographer captures her falling down, believing she is the actress, and contacts the actress' team to demand $100,000 for the photos. The actress is infuriated with the protagonist, but she is not fired to avoid delaying the production.

Paranoid that the actress will expose her deception, the protagonist abandons Sabine's backpack at a crowded marketplace. The next morning, she discovers that the photos have been sold to a tabloid. She skips work and boards a tour bus to Meknes, purchasing slippers and a djellaba at the souk.

When the tour guide announces a passenger is missing, the group splits up to search. The protagonist joins Samantha and Hazel, college friends on a reunion trip. Samantha—the woman whom the protagonist recognized on the flight to Casablanca—was the nurse when Reeves was born. Not recognizing the protagonist, Samantha begins telling the story of Reeves' birth. The protagonist flees, unable to listen, and buys a stolen camera from a vendor.

Samantha and Hazel find the protagonist again, telling her that she was the "missing" tourist due to the guide miscounting. When the protagonist learns that she will have to give a police statement, she puts on her new clothes and slips away. With her camera, she infiltrates a press pool van traveling to Rabat with a Nigerian politician. As an Aretha Franklin song plays on the radio, the protagonist reinvents herself again, introducing herself as Aretha.

== Background ==
According to Vida, The Diver's Clothes Lie Empty was inspired by a real-life trip to Morocco in which her belongings were also stolen; at the local police station, she realized that the incident had potential for her next story. While writing, Vida was inspired by authors Graham Greene and Paul Bowles, as well as the 1975 film The Passenger and the 1999 film The Talented Mr. Ripley.

Vida began writing the novel in second person, which she viewed as a good fit for a story about "the malleability of identity". According to Vida, second-person narration "provides immediacy in that the reader is in the protagonist’s shoes from the start. It can be prescriptive but it can also sound like someone talking to themselves, which I thought was appropriate. And it can also be accusatory: ‘You do this! You do that!’"

Like Vida's first three novels—And Now You Can Go (2003), Let the Northern Lights Erase Your Name (2007), and The Lovers (2010)—The Diver's Clothes Lie Empty involves what Portland Monthly characterized as "a female protagonist who finds herself in a foreign or alien environment, dogged by her past." According to Vida, however, The Diver's Clothes Lie Empty is "lighter in tone" than her previous novels, with "more humor."

The book's title is taken from the poem "The Diver's Clothes Lying Empty" by Rumi, which is about "being part of a hunt for which you are the prey". The protagonist—who was a diver in college—reads the poem during her work as a stand-in.

== Reception ==
In a review for The New York Times, Parul Sehgal said that The Diver's Clothes Lie Empty was Vida's "fourth and finest book, a taut, suspenseful story that ticks along with marvelous efficiency, like a little bomb." The Guardian's Sarah Ditum wrote that the book was "a novel of sublime unease and delicious bewilderment. You are not yourself, and it is wonderful." Fernanda Eberstadt, in another New York Times review, praised the novel's "cool wit and suspense".

For The Washington Post, Katherine Arcement wrote that The Diver's Clothes Lie Empty had "a very Hitchcockian set-up... laced with a deeply engaging humor and wit tinged with sly meta-omniscience." Amy Gentry, in the Chicago Tribune, called the book "something of a shaggy dog story... the real pleasure lies in letting Vida boss you around, coddling and berating you down the narrator’s crooked path." James Kidd, in The Independent, praised the novel's black humor, calling it "moving, clever and bright as a button." Anita Felicelli, for SFGate, said the book was "an emotionally precise and absorbing meditation on how grief can divest us of our most fundamental sense of self", adding that Vida's choice of second-person narration was "a bold move" and "a successful gambit."

Publishers Weekly wrote that The Diver's Clothes Lie Empty was "an emotional and formally clever exploration of identity", adding that the second-person narrative "invites the reader to experience the protagonist’s separation firsthand." Kirkus Reviews called the book "a speedy and suspenseful fish-out-of-water tale with a slyly philosophical bent" and complimented Vida's "plainspoken, sometimes ice-cold minimalist style". Booklist editor Donna Seaman said the novel was "a gorgeously slippery and covertly cosmic tale about identity, theft, and recovery... told cinematically in one long, bewitching take".
