= Tips & Tricks =

American video game magazine

- Premiere Issue November 1994 Volume 1 Number 1 cover art featuring Lord Raiden of Mortal Kombat II
- Editor-in-Chief: Chris Bieniek
- Categories: Video game
- Frequency: Monthly (12 per year)
- Publisher: LFP
- First issue: February 1995
- Final issue: August 2007
- Country: United States
- Based in: Beverly Hills, CA
- Language: English
- OCLC: 30595642

Tips & Tricks
- Editor-in-Chief: Chris Bieniek
- Categories: Video game
- Frequency: Bi-Monthly (6 per year)
- Publisher: LFP
- First issue: December 2007
- Final issue: February 2011
- Country: United States
- Language: English
- ISSN: 1941-3327

Tips & Tricks was a monthly video game magazine devoted to the subjects of video game cheat codes, strategy guides and lifestyle content. Unlike most video game magazines, it did not include critical reviews of video games and was not a primary source of video game industry news. Instead, it focused on gameplay instructions and hidden "Easter eggs" relating to games that its readers might have already purchased.

== Editorial content ==
Often referring to itself as "The #1 Video-Game Tips Magazine," Tips & Tricks was known for its strategy guides or walkthroughs for contemporary console and portable games. Each issue also included an index of button codes and passwords, alphabetized by game title and sorted by console. The magazine also included "lifestyle" content, in which a particular aspect of video game culture would be discussed at length by a regular columnist. Some of these were devoted to a specific game or game series (e.g. Armored Core, Pokémon, Halo, Animal Crossing), while others spotlighted video game-related action figures, comics, music and movies.

== Lineage ==
Tips & Tricks (later Tips & Tricks Codebook) was a video game magazine published by LFP. For most of its existence, the publication was devoted almost exclusively to strategies and codes for popular video games. It began as a spin-off from VideoGames magazine, which in itself morphed out of VideoGames & Computer Entertainment. VG&CE and VideoGames, like Tips & Tricks, were published by LFP following the purchase of ANALOG Computing, ST-LOG and other computer magazines from publishers Michael DesChenes & Lee Pappas in the late 1980s.

Tips & Tricks originated as a spinoff from the monthly "Tips & Tricks" section in VideoGames & Computer Entertainment magazine. Because VideoGames & Computer Entertainment itself grew out of the monthly "Video Game Digest" column in ANALOG Computing magazine, Tips & Tricks was technically the longest-running publication in a succession of related magazines that originated with the first issue of ANALOG in January 1981 - nine months before the publication of Electronic Games which is generally considered to be the world's first video-game magazine. When the final issue of Tips & Tricks Codebook appeared on newsstands in February 2011, it marked the end of a series of print magazines that had covered the video-game industry for 30 consecutive years.

Tips & Tricks Editor-in-Chief Chris Bieniek was interviewed in July 2014, detailing the history of the publication.
