= David Sheff =

American writer (born 1955)

- Born: December 23, 1955 (age 70); Boston, Massachusetts, U.S.
- Education: University of California, Berkeley
- Occupation: Writer
- Spouse: Karen Barbour
- Children: 3, including Nic Sheff
- Writing career
- Notable works: Beautiful Boy: A Father's Journey Through His Son's Addiction; All We Are Saying: The Last Interview with John Lennon and Yoko Ono; Game Over
- Website: www.davidsheff.com

David Sheff (born December 23, 1955) is an American author. He is best known for his interviews with artists, scientists, and pop culture figures, as well as his non-fiction books. Much of his writing, including his memoir Beautiful Boy: A Father's Journey Through His Son's Addiction, deals with substance addiction.

== Early life and education ==
Sheff is of Russian Jewish descent. He is originally from Boston, Massachusetts. He graduated from the University of California, Berkeley.

== Career ==
Working as a journalist, Sheff has written articles and conducted interviews for The New York Times, Rolling Stone, Playboy, Wired, Fortune, and NPR's All Things Considered.

His interview subjects have included Yoko Ono, John Lennon, Frank Zappa, Steve Jobs, Ai Weiwei, Keith Haring, David Hockney, Jack Nicholson, Ted Taylor, Carl Sagan, Betty Friedan, Barney Frank, and Fareed Zakaria.

He has also been an editor of several magazines including New West and California.

== Works ==
Sheff's books include:

- Yoko: A Biography (2025)
- Beautiful Boy: A Father's Journey Through His Son's Addiction
- Clean: Overcoming Addiction and Ending America's Greatest Tragedy
- Game Over
- The Buddhist on Death Row
- All We Are Saying: The Last Interview with John Lennon and Yoko Ono
- High: Everything You Want to Know About Drugs, Alcohol, and Addiction

Beautiful Boy was based on Sheff's New York Times article "My Addicted Son," discussing Sheff's relationship with his son throughout his methamphetamine addiction. An adaptation directed by Felix van Groeningen was released in 2018.

== Views on addiction ==
Sheff argues that addiction is a brain disease and advocates for putting addicts into therapy programs early. He identifies factors such as stress and trauma as major factors that can cause addiction. He argues for teaching life skills to reduce the risk of addiction in response to these risk factors.

== Personal life ==
Sheff lives in Northern California with his wife Karen Barbour. Barbour is an artist, illustrator, and author of children's books. Sheff has three children, including Nic Sheff.

== Honors and awards ==
In 2009, Sheff was included in Time magazine's Time 100 and on the magazine's World's Most Influential People list. Beautiful Boy won the Barnes & Noble Discover Great New Writers Award for nonfiction.

He has received several awards from organizations dealing with addiction, including College on Problems of Drug Dependence (CPDD), American Society of Addiction Medicine, the Partnership for Drug-free Kids, American College of Neuropsychopharmacology (ACNP), and the American Society of Addiction Medicine (ASAM), and was the first recipient of the American Academy of Addiction Psychiatry (AAAP) Arts and Literature Award.
