= Elizabeth O'Connor =

English writer (born 1991)

- Born: 1991 (age 34–35); Birmingham, England
- Education: Durham University; King's College London; University of Birmingham
- Years active: 2019–present

Elizabeth O'Connor (born 1991) is an English writer. Her debut novel Whale Fall (2024) won the Chautauqua Prize and a Betty Trask Award.

== Early life and education ==
O'Connor is from Birmingham. Her Irish grandfather was from the Dingle Peninsula, while her Welsh grandmother was from a fishing village in North Wales; both moved to English cities during World War II.

O'Connor graduated with a Bachelor of Arts (BA) in English literature from Durham University in 2012 and a Master of Arts (MA) in Shakespeare studies from King's College London in 2013. She completed a PhD in 2019 at the University of Birmingham on the nature writing of H.D..

== Career ==
O'Connor's short story "Woman with a White Pekingese" won the 2020 White Review Short Story Prize.

Via a 10-way auction in October 2022, Picador Books (an Pan Macmillan imprint) acquired the rights to publish O'Connor's debut novel Whale Fall in 2024. The novel takes place in 1938 on a fictional small island off the coast of Wales and features 18-year-old Manod Llan seeking to leave as two English anthropologists Joan and Edward visiting the island hire her as a translator. O'Connor had wanted to write about depopulated islands, reading memoirs of evacuees from Bardsey Island, St Kilda, the Blaskets and the Aran Islands. Whale Fall won the Chautauqua Prize and a Betty Trask Award. It also made the ALA Notable Books list, and was a BBC Two Between the Covers book club pick, shortlisted for the Barnes & Noble Discover Prize, and longlisted for the Dublin Literary Award. O'Connor was named one of the 10 best new novelists of 2024 by The Observer.

O'Connor is using her Chautauqua Prize to write her second novel.

== Bibliography ==
=== Novels ===
- Whale Fall (2024)

=== Short stories ===
- "Woman with a White Pekingese" (2019)
- "Gororau (Borderlands)" (2021) in Granta

== Accolades ==
Year	Award	Category	Title	Result	Ref.
2019	The White Review Short Story Prize		"Woman with a White Pekingese"	Won	
2024	Barnes & Noble Discover Prize		Whale Fall	Shortlisted	
2025	Dublin Literary Award		Whale Fall	Longlisted	
2025	Ondaatje Prize		Whale Fall	Longlisted	
2025	Chautauqua Prize		Whale Fall	Won	
2025	Betty Trask Award		Whale Fall	Won	
