= Nic Sheff =

American writer

- Born: San Francisco, California, U.S.
- Known for: Tweak: Growing Up On Methamphetamines (Author); We All Fall Down: Living with Addiction (Author); Beautiful Boy: A Father's Journey Through His Son's Addiction (Appears in)
- Parents: David Sheff (father); Vicki Sheff (mother)

Nic Sheff is an American writer. He is the author of two memoirs, including the New York Times best seller Tweak: Growing Up On Methamphetamines and We All Fall Down: Living With Addiction. He has also written several novels for young adults and written episodes for The Killing, Recovery Road and 13 Reasons Why.

== Personal life ==
As of 2011, Sheff lived with his wife in Los Angeles.

== Bibliography ==
=== Memoirs ===
- Tweak: Growing Up On Methamphetamines (2008, Atheneum Books for Young Readers)
- We All Fall Down: Living With Addiction (2011, Little, Brown Books for Young Readers)

=== Novels ===
- Schizo (2014, Philomel Books)
- Harmony House (2016, HarperTeen)

== Related works ==
Sheff is the subject of his father David Sheff's memoir, Beautiful Boy: A Father's Journey Through His Son's Addiction, and was a consultant on its 2018 film adaptation, in which he was portrayed by Timothée Chalamet. For his performance, Chalamet was nominated for a Golden Globe Award, Screen Actors Guild Award, and BAFTA Award, all for Best Actor in a Supporting Role.
