= Let the Northern Lights Erase Your Name =

2007 novel by Vendela Vida

- First edition
- Author: Vendela Vida
- Genre: Novel
- Published: 2 January 2007
- Publisher: Ecco Press

Let the Northern Lights Erase Your Name is a novel written by Vendela Vida. The book was first published on 2 January 2007 by Ecco Press. This was Vida's second published novel.

== Plot ==
Clarissa Iverton, a New Yorker is the female protagonist of the novel. Her mother disappeared when she was 14 years old, and when she became 28 years old, her father died. After the death of her father she realized that person was not her real father. Knowing this Clarissa becomes desperate to meet her real parents. She understands to unveil this secret she has to travel to Finland. She abandons her fiancé and starts journey to Helsinki, Finland

== Reviews ==
The Guardian wrote—

The story is loaded with creepy quaintness. . . Let the Northern Lights Erase Your Name tries to be many things - a thriller, a meditation on identity and language, a family romance gone wrong, a Lapland travelogue. Olivia emerges rather unexpectedly from the middle of it all, a comic invention of real energy and scope.

The New York Times found—

Vida sustains a bleakly comic aspect of this excruciatingly sad story, as Clarissa blunders around the Arctic Rim, accosting strangers in the manner of that hapless lost chick in P. D. Eastman’s children’s classic, “Are You My Mother?”... This emotional core makes the book much more than an Edward Gorey comic strip. Take away the exotic setting and circumstance and you have a relentlessly believable story of a child’s futile struggle to, well, “be loved.”
