= Madeline Cash =

American author and co-founder of Forever Magazine

- Occupation: Author

Madeline Cash is an American author and co-founder of Forever Magazine. Her debut novel Lost Lambs was published in 2026 by Farrar, Straus and Giroux. Cash previously authored a collection of short stories, Earth Angel, published in 2023. Her short fiction, op-eds and interviews with artists have been featured in publications including Nylon, Los Angeles Times, Highsnobiety, The Baffler, and Granta.

== Writing career ==
In 2020, Cash co-founded Forever Magazine in New York during the Covid-19 pandemic lockdown, organizing small reading events in New York apartments and community gardens.

In 2023, Cash authored a collection of short stories titled Earth Angel, which won the 2023 PenCraft Fiction Award.

In March 2024, Doubleday acquired UK and Commonwealth distribution rights (excluding Canada) to her debut novel Lost Lambs in a pre-empt deal within 36 hours of its submission to the publisher in the United States. The novel was well received by critics, including The New Yorker.

== Works ==
- Earth Angel (2023) ISBN 9781250457769
- Lost Lambs (2026) ISBN 9781529946123
