= Sam Savage =

American writer (1940–2019)

Samuel Phillips Savage
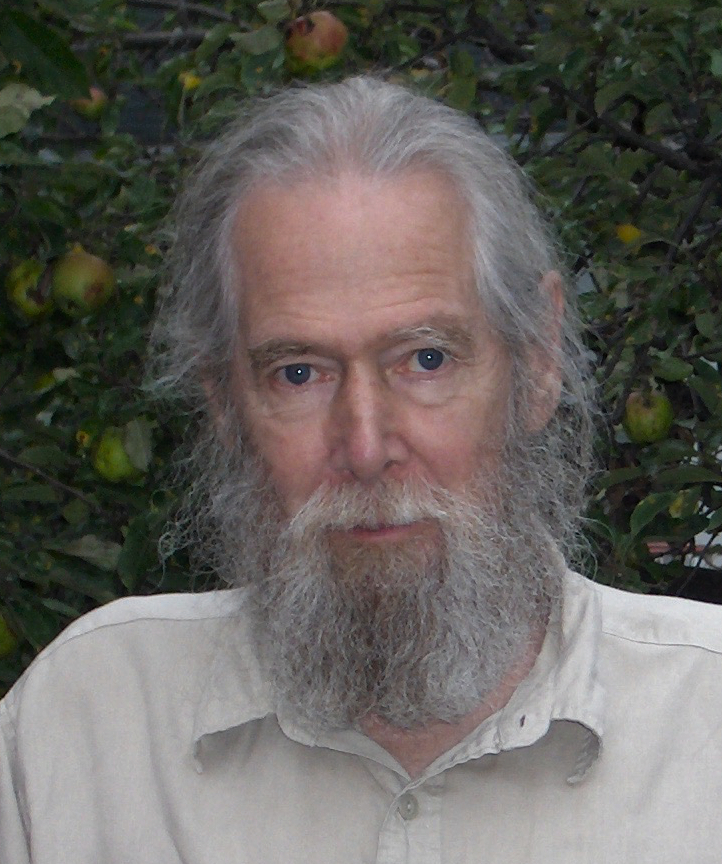
- Born: November 9, 1940; Camden, South Carolina, U.S.
- Died: January 17, 2019 (aged 78); Madison, Wisconsin, U.S.
- Education: Yale University (BA, PhD)
- Occupation: Novelist
- Spouse: Nora Manheim

Samuel Phillips Savage (November 9, 1940 – January 17, 2019) was an American novelist and poet, best known for his 2006 novel Firmin: Adventures of a Metropolitan Lowlife. Other published works are The Cry of the Sloth, The Criminal Life of Effie O, and Glass.

== Life and work ==
Samuel Phillips Savage was born in 1940 in Camden, South Carolina. His father, Henry Savage Jr., a lawyer by profession, was also an author, publishing several books of history and natural history. Savage graduated from Yale University in 1968 and was awarded the Warren Memorial High Scholarship Prize for "the B.A. candidate with highest scholastic rank." He subsequently studied philosophy at Yale and at the University of Heidelberg, Germany, receiving a Ph.D. from Yale University, with a dissertation on the political thought of Thomas Hobbes. He also taught at Yale, in his words "briefly and unhappily."

Before attending Yale he was poetry editor of Reflections, a small literary magazine published in Chapel Hill, North Carolina, in the early 1960s, and was active in the Civil Rights Movement. After leaving Yale, Savage spent several years in France. He returned to South Carolina in 1980, settling in the small coastal village of McClellanville. In 2004 he moved to Madison, Wisconsin. Before writing, he worked as a bicycle mechanic, carpenter, crab fisherman, and letterpress printer.

He married Nora Manheim, daughter of the noted literary translator Ralph Manheim. They had two children. Savage also had a son by a previous marriage.

Savage was the author of six novels. The first was a novel in verse, The Criminal Life of Effie O., published in 2005 and described as a "children's book for adults". It was illustrated by Virginia Beverley (Savage). In 2006, Savage published Firmin: Adventures of a Metropolitan Lowlife, a darkly humorous story about a bookstore rat in difficult times. In 2007 the Spanish publishing house Seix Barral purchased the world rights to Firmin, including English-language rights. The novel subsequently became a bestseller in Europe and has been translated into more than a dozen languages.

The Cry of the Sloth, published in 2009, is a tragic-comic novel that recounts the downhill slide of a failed literary man. The novel is composed of every word the protagonist writes over a period of four months, including letters, novel drafts, newspaper advertisements, and grocery lists.

Glass, published in 2011, is the fictional memoir of Edna, the wife of a deceased author. Edna has been asked to write a preface to her late husband's novel. Instead, however, Edna defiantly endeavors to write a separate book "not just about Clarence but also about my life, as one could not pretend to understand Clarence without that." Day by day pages of seemingly random thoughts fall from her typewriter. Gradually taking shape within the mosaic of memory is the story of a remarkable marriage and of a mind pushed to its limits.

The Way of the Dog, published in 2013, is a novel that follows Harold Nivenson, a decrepit, aging man who was once a painter and arts patron. The death of Peter Meinienger, his friend turned romantic and intellectual rival, prompts him to ruminate on his own career as a minor artist and collector and make sense of a lifetime of gnawing doubt. Over time, his bitterness toward his family, his gentrifying neighborhood, and the decline of intelligent artistic discourse gives way to a kind of peace within himself, as he emerges from the shadow of the past and finds a reason to live, every day, in "the now".

His last novel, It Will End with Us, published in 2014, is a first-person narrative by an aging upper-class woman from the American South who is trying to discover the truth about her past from a collection of fragmentary, perhaps uncertain, memories. In 2016 the online literary journal Numero Cinq published "Zero Gravity", a collection of poems dating from 1981 to 2015.

== Bibliography ==
- The Criminal Life of Effie O. (2005)
- Firmin: Adventures of a Metropolitan Lowlife (2006)
- The Cry of the Sloth: The Mostly Tragic Story of Andrew Whittaker, Being his Collected, Final, and Absolutely Complete Works (2009)
- Glass (2011)
- The Way of the Dog (2013)
- It Will End with Us (2014)
- Zero Gravity - Poem collection (1981–2015)
- An Orphanage of Dreams (2019) - Short stories

== Acclaim ==
Savage was a finalist for the 2007 Awards for books published in 2006 from the Society of Midland Authors, a 2006 Litblog Co-op Read This choice, as well as a Barnes & Noble Great New Writers pick.
