= Patrick Cottrell =

American writer (born 1981)

- Born: Patty Yumi Cottrell; 1981 (age 44–45); South Korea
- Education: Hamline University (BA); School of the Art Institute of Chicago (MFA)
- Occupation: Writer
- Writing career
- Genres: Fiction; short story; novel
- Notable work: Sorry to Disrupt the Peace
- Notable awards: Whiting Award (2018)
- Website: patrick-cottrell.com

Patrick Cottrell (born in 1981) is an American writer. He is the author of Sorry to Disrupt the Peace and the winner of a 2018 Whiting Award. His work has appeared Harper's Magazine, Granta, Ploughshares, BOMB Magazine, The White Review, McSweeney's Quarterly, and elsewhere. He teaches at the University of Denver, where he is the Director of Creative Writing.

== Early life and education ==
Cottrell was born in South Korea in 1981 and was adopted, along with two biologically unrelated younger Korean boys, into a family from the Midwestern United States. He was raised in Pittsburgh, Chicago, and Milwaukee.

Cottrell started his first novel in his early thirties. He earned his B.A. from Hamline University in 2004. In 2012, he received his M.F.A. from the School of the Art Institute of Chicago.

== Career ==
After moving from New York to Los Angeles, he completed the novel in 2016. The resulting book, a "stylized contemporary noir" titled Sorry to Disrupt the Peace, was published by McSweeney's in 2017. Cottrell has called the book "an anti-memoir". It tells the story of Helen, a woman adopted from Korea at a young age, who returns to her adoptive parents' home in Milwaukee after her adoptive brother's suicide. Writing for The Rumpus, Liza St. James called the book "marvelously interior" and praised the writing as "discursive and associative and gripping all at once". The Guardian called the book "electrifying in its freshness" and the San Francisco Chronicle called it "a strange and lovely thing". Sorry to Disrupt the Peace won a National Gold Medal from the Independent Publisher Book Awards for Best First Book in the Fiction category. It also won Barnes & Noble’s 2017 Discover Award for Fiction.

In 2018, Cottrell received the Whiting Award in Fiction, which is given to promising writers in the early stages of their careers. The selection committee said that his writing "opens up fresh lines of questioning in the old interrogations of identity".

== Personal life ==
Cottrell came out as transgender in 2021.

== Recognition ==
- 2017: Barnes & Noble Discover Award
- 2017: National Gold Medal from the Independent Publisher Book Awards for Best First Book – Fiction
- 2018: Whiting Award

== Bibliography ==
- Cottrell, Patrick (2017). Sorry to Disrupt the Peace. McSweeney's. ISBN 9781944211301.
- Cottrell, Patrick (2026). Afternoon Hours of a Hermit: A Novel. Ecco Press. ISBN 9780063435063.
