= Vendela Vida =

American novelist

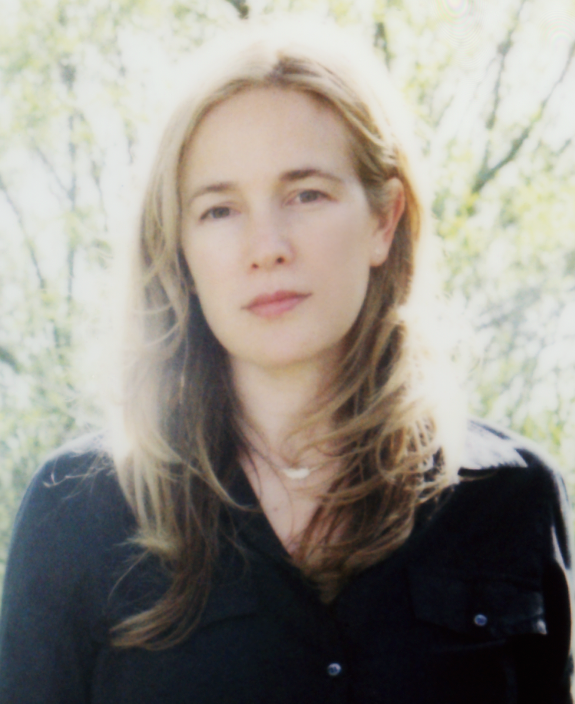
- Vida in 2010
- Born: September 6, 1971 (age 55); San Francisco, California, U.S.
- Education: Middlebury College (AB); Columbia University (MFA)
- Occupations: Novelist, journalist, editor, screenplay writer, educator
- Spouse: Dave Eggers
- Children: 2
- Website: www.vendelavida.com

Vendela Vida (born September 6, 1971) is an American novelist, journalist, editor, screenplay writer, and educator. She is the author of multiple books, has worked as a writing teacher, and is a founder and editor of The Believer magazine.

== Early life ==
Vida was born on September 6, 1971, in San Francisco, California. Both of her parents were European immigrants; her mother was from Sweden and her father is Hungarian. She inherited the name Vendela from her maternal grandmother.

She left California to attend Middlebury College in Vermont where she received her bachelor's degree in English in 1993. A friend from Middlebury eventually introduced her to her future spouse, Dave Eggers. She later continued her studies and received a Master of Fine Arts degree at Columbia University. After graduating, she interned at the Paris Review, and adapted her master's degree thesis into her first book, Girls on the Verge.

== Career ==
In 2003, Vida co-founded The Believer magazine with Dave Eggers and works as an editor with her friends from grad school Heidi Julavits and Ed Park. The Believer happens to be located next door to McSweeney's.

She is a co-founder and board member of 826 Valencia, a nonprofit organization that teaches creative writing to children and teens.

Vida collaborated with Dave Eggers on the screenplay for the 2009 film Away We Go, directed by Sam Mendes and co-starring John Krasinski and Maya Rudolph.

In 2017, Vida was a Lurie Author-in-Residence and instructor in the Department of English and Comparative Literature at San Jose State University.

== Books ==
Published in 2003, And Now You Can Go is a novel set in New York City, San Francisco, and the Philippines, tracing the impulsive journeys of a young woman in the wake of an assault. In a 2003 Guardian article Vida voiced her plan to author a trilogy of novels "on the subject of violence and rage."

The second novel, Let the Northern Lights Erase Your Name (2007, HarperCollins), is a thriller that takes place in the Sápmi region. As a 2013 fellow at the Sundance Labs, Vida alongside Eva Weber developed Let the Northern Lights Erase Your Name into a script, which received the Sundance Institute Mahindra Global Filmmaking Award.

The Lovers (June 2010, Ecco), author Joyce Carol Oates called it "a riveting and suspenseful novel about an American woman’s voyage to self-discovery.” The Diver's Clothes Lie Empty (2015, Ecco/HarperCollins), was inspired by a trip Vida took to Morocco where her bag was stolen.

Two of Vida’s novels have been New York Times notable books of the year, and she is the winner of the 2007 Kate Chopin Award, given to a writer whose female protagonist chooses an unconventional path.

== Personal life ==
She is married to author Dave Eggers, has two children, and lives in the San Francisco Bay Area. Vida and Eggers had met in 1998 in San Francisco at a wedding and started dating in 1999.

== Works ==
- Vida, Vendela (2000), Girls on the Verge: Debutante Dips, Drive-Bys, and Other Initiations (revised ed.), St. Martin's Press, ISBN 978-0-312-26328-7
- Vida, Vendela (2003), And Now You Can Go (reprint ed.), Paw Prints, ISBN 978-1-4395-7338-9
- Vida, Vendela (2008), Let the Northern Lights Erase Your Name: A Novel (reprint ed.), HarperCollins, ISBN 978-0-06-082838-7
- Vida, Vendela (2008), The Believer Book of Writers Talking to Writers (revised ed.), McSweeney's, ISBN 978-1-932416-94-7
- Eggers, Dave; Vida, Vendela (2009), Away We Go: A Screenplay, Vintage Books, ISBN 978-0-307-47588-6
- Julavits, Heidi; Park, Ed; Vida, Vendela (2009), Read Hard: Five Years of Great Writing from the Believer, McSweeney's, ISBN 978-1-934781-39-5
- Vida, Vendela (2010), The Lovers: A Novel, HarperCollins, ISBN 978-0-06-082839-4
- Vida, Vendela (2015), The Diver's Clothes Lie Empty, Ecco/HarperCollins, ISBN 9780062110916
- Vida, Vendela (2021), We Run the Tides, Ecco/HarperCollins, ISBN 9780062936233
