= Sorry to Disrupt the Peace =

2017 novel by Patrick Cottrell

- First edition
- Author: Patrick Cottrell
- Publisher: McSweeney's
- Publication date: 2017

Sorry to Disrupt the Peace is a 2017 novel by American writer Patrick Cottrell. It concerns a woman, Helen, who lives in New York City but who returns to her home state of Wisconsin after the suicide of her adopted brother. Cottrell has stressed that the novel is not autobiographical.
