= Kitty Fitzgerald =

Irish born writer

- Born: 25 September 1946 (age 79); Ireland
- Occupations: writer, editor, poet

Kitty Fitzgerald (born 25 September 1946) is an Irish born writer.

Kitty Fitzgerald was born in Ireland. She grew up in Yorkshire and lives in Northumberland. She gained a degree in English as a mature student and went on to become a full time writer shortly after that. She is a novelist, poet and playwright. She has written 4 radio plays for the BBC, eight plays for the theatre and film, as well as fiction and poetry. She also worked as editor for IRON Press. Fitzgerald has been awarded Hawthornden Castle Fellowship. For her film Dream On she won the award of the most original screenplay at La Baule Film Festival. Fitzgerald won the Short Story Competition in Notes from the Underground/Latitude Festival in 2009. She has also won a Time to Write Award and a Hosking Houses Trust Writing Award. In 2015 Fitzgerald was Writer-in-Residence for the University of Manitoba in their Centre for Creative Writing and Oral Culture.

== Selected publications ==
- Marge (Sheba)
- Snapdragons (Brandon)
- Small Acts of Treachery (Brandon)
- Pigtopia (Faber)
- Miranda’s Shadow (IRON Press, 2013)
