= Gin Phillips =

American author

- Born: Birmingham, Alabama, U.S.
- Education: Birmingham–Southern College
- Occupation: Author
- Website: ginphillips.com

Gin Phillips (Birmingham, Alabama) is an American author. Her first novel, The Well and the Mine, was awarded the 2009 Barnes & Noble Discover Award, a $10,000 prize for a first novel. Her second novel, Come in and Cover Me, was published in 2012. She published two novels for children:The Hidden Summer in 2013 and A Little Bit of Spectacular in 2015.

Phillips grew up in Montgomery, Alabama, and graduated from Birmingham–Southern College in 1997. Her second novel, Come in and Cover Me, is a mystery novel about an archeologist in New Mexico who experiences visions of a 12th-century potter from the Mimbres culture.

== Bibliography ==
- The Well and The Mine (2007)
- Come In and Cover Me (2012)
- The Hidden Summer (2013)
- A Little Bit of Spectacular (2015)
- Fierce Kingdom (2017)
- Family Law (2022)
