= Upward Bound (novel) =

2026 novel by Woody Brown

- Author: Woody Brown (disputed)
- Publisher: Penguin Random House
- Publication date: March 31, 2026

Upward Bound is a 2026 novel allegedly written by Woody Brown, a profoundly autistic minimally speaking American. It was published by Hogarth, an imprint of Penguin Random House. It is a fictional novel centered on an adult daycare center for disabled people in Southern California and portions of it are based on Brown's life as a non-speaking autistic person.

Upward Bound was written with Brown's mother, Mary Brown, using the rapid prompting method, a variant of facilitated communication which has been scientifically discredited since 1993. The novel's publication re-ignited the decades old debate about facilitated communication. Many observers have questioned whether Woody Brown could be considered its author.

== Premise ==
The novel consists of linked stories set at an adult daycare center for disabled people in Southern California, told from the perspectives of both clients and staff members. A central character, Walter, is a nonspeaking autistic man whose experiences parallel elements of Woody Brown's own life.

== Writing and publication history ==
According to a profile in The New York Times, Woody Brown composed the novel by spelling out letters on his communication board at a pace of roughly one paragraph per day, with Mary Brown transcribing his selections. The writing process took approximately two and a half years. Mary Brown (who previously worked as a story analyst for Hollywood studios) has stated that she reads sentences back to her son to confirm accuracy and does not contribute to the content. However, following a TV appearance on April 1, 2026, during which Brown appeared to type only nonsensical strings of letters, his ability to produce written language has been widely questioned.

Upward Bound was published by Hogarth, an imprint of Penguin Random House, on March 31, 2026, as part of a two-book deal.

== Reception ==
The novel received a starred review from Publishers Weekly and positive notices from Kirkus Reviews and Booklist. It was named a most anticipated book by The New York Times, Time, and other publications. The novel was selected as the April 2026 pick for the Read with Jenna book club.

Author Mona Simpson praised the novel, and Paul Beatty, who taught Woody Brown at Columbia, described being struck by the range of characters and voices in the book.

In September 2026, the German publishing house Kiepenheuer & Witsch published a German translation under the title "Ein ganz normales Wunder" ("a perfectly normal miracle"). The book received positive reviews i.a. by the public broadcasters Deutschlandfunk, Hessischer Rundfunk and Westdeutscher Rundfunk. Only the review by Westdeutscher Rundfunk hinted at the disputed authorship.

== Authorship ==
Woody Brown was born in 1997 to Drew Brown, who is head of production at Paramount TV, and Mary Brown, who has a master's degree in English literature from Northwestern University. The family currently lives in the Los Angeles area. Woody Brown was diagnosed with severe autism in early childhood. He reportedly communicates by pointing to letters on an alphabet board held by his mother, Mary Brown, who reads the letters aloud and transcribes them. He graduated from UCLA in 2022, the first nonspeaking autistic student to do so, where he received the English Department's Christopher Zyda Creative Writing Award. He went on to receive an MFA in creative writing from Columbia University in 2024. As of 2026, he is residing in Los Angeles, California. A 2024 essay in The Hastings Center Report cited Woody Brown's graduation from UCLA as an example of facilitated communication being "platformed at the highest levels of science and education," and called on bioethicists to oppose what the authors characterized as pseudoscience.

Brown's communication method, the rapid prompting method, is classified by critics as a form of facilitated communication. Controlled tests show reliably, that letter selection in facilitated communication sessions is always—typically unconsciously—controlled by the facilitator, likely through the ideomotor effect. Guidelines and position statements by relevant professional associations therefore reject facilitated communication. Persons using the letter board or spelling method have a partner who relays the words being typed onto the board via tapping. On multiple occasions, Woody Brown has been filmed not looking at the board while tapping, frequently tapping empty spaces between words and using only a limited area of the letter board, suggesting that no deliberate letter selection takes place.

Upon initial release of the book, many of the journalists, editors and authors who commented on Upward Bound did not question its authorship. Rivka Galchen, who worked with Woody Brown at Columbia, told Publishers Weekly that she had no more doubt about his authorship than she would about any other student in the class.

However, questions about who wrote Upward Bound arose after a segment featuring Woody and Mary Brown aired on The Today Show. Writing in The Atlantic, Daniel Engber noted that the camera showed Woody Brown pointing to letters which did not correspond to what his mother said, or to anything else:

In the broadcast, Mary says: "To finally be in the room where learning was happening, I felt like I was in heaven." But Woody’s finger seems to say: Tobgdhi nvza.

Psychologist Stuart Vyse noted,

"This young man was brought on The Today Show to mark Autism Acceptance Month, and yet, in a cruel irony, everything about this case suggests that his true nature was not acceptable to his parents. He has been required to perform a pantomime in service of an appealing fantasy. Worse yet, like all victims of Facilitated Communication, he has endured years of useless tapping on letter boards that could have been spent in more appropriate instruction. Rather than learning to live as independently as possible, Woody remains dependent on his mother."
