= Emma Pattee =

American climate journalist and writer

- Born: San Diego, California, U.S.
- Education: Portland Community College, Portland State University
- Occupations: Journalist, writer
- Writing career
- Years active: 2000s–present
- Notable work: Tilt

Emma Pattee is an American climate journalist and writer.

== Life ==
She was born in San Diego. She studied at Portland Community College, and Portland State University. Her work appeared in Mic, Elle, and Glamour.

She is based in Portland, Oregon.

== Work ==
- Pattee, Emma (2025). Tilt. New York: Scribner. ISBN 978-1-6680-5547-2.
