= Katie Yee =

Writer

- Occupation: Writer
- Notable work: Maggie; Or, a Man and a Woman Walk Into a Bar

Katie Yee is a writer. Her debut novel, Maggie; or, A Man and a Woman Walk Into a Bar, was released in 2025.

== Career ==
Yee was formerly a Communications Intern at PEN America and worked at Literary Hub in the early 2020s.

In 2025, Yee released her debut novel, Maggie; or, A Man and a Woman Walk Into a Bar. Structured by the classic bar joke per its namesake, it was published by Summit Books on July 22, 2025. In it, The Washington Post found that "Yee treats the darkest themes with unlikely levity," and The Times called it "full of resentment-tinged wit," likening it to Heartburn by Nora Ephron. Time named it one of a hundred must-read books for 2025.

== Works ==
- Maggie; or, A Man and a Woman Walk Into a Bar S&S/Summit Books, 2026. ISBN 9781668084229
